= Vice President of Liberia =

Deputy head of state and government of Liberia

Vice President of the Republic of Liberia
- Coat of arms of Liberia

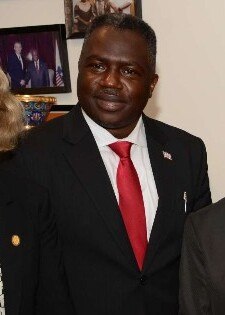
- Incumbent; Jeremiah Koung since January 22, 2024
- Style: Mr. Vice President (Informal); His Excellency (Formal)
- Term length: Six years
- Constituting instrument: Constitution of Liberia (1986)
- Formation: January 3, 1848; 178 years ago
- First holder: Nathaniel Brander
- Website: www.emansion.gov.lr

The vice president of the Republic of Liberia is the second-highest executive official in Liberia, and one of only two elected executive offices along with the president. The vice president is elected on the same ticket with the president to a six-year term. In the event of the death, resignation or removal of the president, the vice president ascends to the presidency, and holds the position for the remainder of their predecessor's term. The vice president also serves as the president of the Senate and may cast a vote in the event of a tie. The current vice president is Jeremiah Koung, serving under president Joseph Boakai. He began his term on January 22, 2024.

== Qualifications ==
Article 52 of the Constitution lays out the qualifications for candidates for vice president. To be eligible for office under the current Constitution, a vice presidential candidate must:

- be a natural born citizen of Liberia;
- be at least thirty-five years old;
- own real property valued at least $25,000;
- have resided in Liberia for at least ten years.

Additionally, the vice president may not reside in the same county as the president.

== Succession ==
Under Article 63(b), the vice president ascends to the presidency in the event of president's death, resignation, impeachment, or when the president is declared incapable of carrying out the duties of the office. In the event of ascension, the vice president serves as president for the remainder of their predecessor's term, though this period is not considered a term for the purposes of term limits to the presidency. According to Article 63(a), should the president-elect die or become otherwise incapacitated before his or her inauguration, the vice president-elect is sworn in as president in their place, though a term of this nature does constitute a term for the purposes of determining term limits.

To date, five vice presidents have ascended to the presidency, either due to the president's death, resignation, or removal from office: James Skivring Smith, Alfred Francis Russell, William D. Coleman, William Tolbert, and Moses Blah.

There have been twelve vacancies in the office, the first of which occurred between October 26, 1871 and January 1, 1872; after the ascension of James Skivring Smith to the office of president. The most recent vacancy was between August 11, 2003 and January 16, 2006; after the ascension of Moses Blah to the office of president and prior to the election of Joseph Boakai.

== List of officeholders ==
Political parties

Republican Party
True Whig Party
National Democratic Party
National Patriotic Party
Unity Party

Other affiliations

Independent

Symbols

^{†} Died in office

No.	Portrait	Name (Birth–Death)	Term of office			Political party	Elected	President	Notes
No.	Portrait	Name (Birth–Death)	Took office	Left office	Time in office	Political party	Elected	President	Notes
1		Nathaniel Brander (1796–1870)	January 3, 1848	January 7, 1850	2 years, 4 days	Independent	1847	Roberts	
2		Anthony D. Williams (1799–1860)	January 7, 1850	January 2, 1854	3 years, 360 days	Independent	1849	Roberts	
2		Anthony D. Williams (1799–1860)	January 7, 1850	January 2, 1854	3 years, 360 days	Independent	1851	Roberts	
3		Stephen Allen Benson (1816–1865)	January 2, 1854	January 7, 1856	2 years, 5 days	Republican Party	1853	Roberts	
4		Beverly Page Yates (1811–1883)	January 7, 1856	January 2, 1860	3 years, 360 days	Independent	1855	Benson	
4		Beverly Page Yates (1811–1883)	January 7, 1856	January 2, 1860	3 years, 360 days	Independent	1857	Benson	
5		Daniel Bashiel Warner (1815–1880)	January 2, 1860	January 4, 1864	4 years, 2 days	Republican Party	1859	Benson	
5		Daniel Bashiel Warner (1815–1880)	January 2, 1860	January 4, 1864	4 years, 2 days	Republican Party	1861	Benson	
6		James M. Priest (1819–1883)	January 4, 1864	January 6, 1868	4 years, 2 days	Republican Party	1863	Warner	
6		James M. Priest (1819–1883)	January 4, 1864	January 6, 1868	4 years, 2 days	Republican Party	1865	Warner	
7		Joseph Gibson (1823–1886)	January 6, 1868	January 3, 1870	1 year, 362 days	Republican Party	1867	Payne	
8		James Skivring Smith (1825–1884)	January 3, 1870	October 26, 1871 (Ascended)	1 year, 296 days	True Whig Party	1869	Roye	(Note: President Roye was forcibly removed from office on October 26, 1871. Vice President Smith was sworn in and served the remaining two months of Roye's presidency with no vice president.)
Vacancy by ascension			October 26, 1871	January 1, 1872			1869	Smith	(Note: President Roye was forcibly removed from office on October 26, 1871. Vice President Smith was sworn in and served the remaining two months of Roye's presidency with no vice president.)
9		Anthony W. Gardner (1820–1885)	January 1, 1872	January 3, 1876	4 years, 2 days	Republican Party	1871	Roberts	
9		Anthony W. Gardner (1820–1885)	January 1, 1872	January 3, 1876	4 years, 2 days	Republican Party	1873	Roberts	
10		Charles Harmon (1832–1886)	January 3, 1876	January 7, 1878	2 years, 4 days	Republican Party	1875	Payne	(Note: On 1 January 1878, six days prior to the inauguration of Anthony Gardner as president, the House of Representatives impeached and suspended President Payne from office. Vice President Harmon served as acting president for the final six days of the administration.)
11		Alfred Francis Russell (1817–1884)	January 7, 1878	January 20, 1883 (Ascended)	5 years, 13 days	True Whig Party	1877	Gardner	(Note: President Gardner resigned from office after falling seriously ill. Vice President Russell served as president for the remaining year of Gardner's term with no vice president.)
11		Alfred Francis Russell (1817–1884)	January 7, 1878	January 20, 1883 (Ascended)	5 years, 13 days	True Whig Party	1879	Gardner	(Note: President Gardner resigned from office after falling seriously ill. Vice President Russell served as president for the remaining year of Gardner's term with no vice president.)
11		Alfred Francis Russell (1817–1884)	January 7, 1878	January 20, 1883 (Ascended)	5 years, 13 days	True Whig Party	1881	Gardner	(Note: President Gardner resigned from office after falling seriously ill. Vice President Russell served as president for the remaining year of Gardner's term with no vice president.)
Vacancy by ascension			January 20, 1883	January 7, 1884			1881	Russell	(Note: President Gardner resigned from office after falling seriously ill. Vice President Russell served as president for the remaining year of Gardner's term with no vice president.)
12		James Thompson (?–?)	January 7, 1884	January 4, 1892	7 years, 362 days	True Whig Party	1883	Johnson	
12		James Thompson (?–?)	January 7, 1884	January 4, 1892	7 years, 362 days	True Whig Party	1885	Johnson	
12		James Thompson (?–?)	January 7, 1884	January 4, 1892	7 years, 362 days	True Whig Party	1887	Johnson	
12		James Thompson (?–?)	January 7, 1884	January 4, 1892	7 years, 362 days	True Whig Party	1889	Johnson	
13		William D. Coleman (1842–1908)	January 4, 1892	November 12, 1896 (Ascended)	4 years, 313 days	True Whig Party	1891	Cheeseman	(Note: President Cheeseman died in office. Vice President Coleman served as president for the remainder of Cheeseman's term with no vice president, and then was elected president in his own right in 1897 with Joseph J. Ross as his vice president.)
13		William D. Coleman (1842–1908)	January 4, 1892	November 12, 1896 (Ascended)	4 years, 313 days	True Whig Party	1893	Cheeseman	(Note: President Cheeseman died in office. Vice President Coleman served as president for the remainder of Cheeseman's term with no vice president, and then was elected president in his own right in 1897 with Joseph J. Ross as his vice president.)
13		William D. Coleman (1842–1908)	January 4, 1892	November 12, 1896 (Ascended)	4 years, 313 days	True Whig Party	1895	Cheeseman	(Note: President Cheeseman died in office. Vice President Coleman served as president for the remainder of Cheeseman's term with no vice president, and then was elected president in his own right in 1897 with Joseph J. Ross as his vice president.)
Vacancy by ascension			November 12, 1896	January 3, 1898			1895	Coleman	(Note: President Cheeseman died in office. Vice President Coleman served as president for the remainder of Cheeseman's term with no vice president, and then was elected president in his own right in 1897 with Joseph J. Ross as his vice president.)
14		Joseph J. Ross (1842–1899)	January 3, 1898	October 24, 1899^{[†]}	1 year, 294 days	True Whig Party	1897	Coleman	(Note: Vice President Ross died in 1900, leaving President Coleman without a vice president. On December 11, 1900, Coleman resigned, and Secretary of State Gibson served as president for the remainder of Coleman's term without a vice president, before being elected in his own right in 1901 with Joseph D. Summerville as his vice president.)
14		Joseph J. Ross (1842–1899)	January 3, 1898	October 24, 1899^{[†]}	1 year, 294 days	True Whig Party	1899	Coleman	(Note: Vice President Ross died in 1900, leaving President Coleman without a vice president. On December 11, 1900, Coleman resigned, and Secretary of State Gibson served as president for the remainder of Coleman's term without a vice president, before being elected in his own right in 1901 with Joseph D. Summerville as his vice president.)
Vacancy by death			October 24, 1899	January 6, 1902			1899	Coleman	(Note: Vice President Ross died in 1900, leaving President Coleman without a vice president. On December 11, 1900, Coleman resigned, and Secretary of State Gibson served as president for the remainder of Coleman's term without a vice president, before being elected in his own right in 1901 with Joseph D. Summerville as his vice president.)
Vacancy by death			October 24, 1899	January 6, 1902			1899	Gibson	(Note: Vice President Ross died in 1900, leaving President Coleman without a vice president. On December 11, 1900, Coleman resigned, and Secretary of State Gibson served as president for the remainder of Coleman's term without a vice president, before being elected in his own right in 1901 with Joseph D. Summerville as his vice president.)
15		Joseph D. Summerville (1860–1905)	January 6, 1902	July 27, 1905^{[†]}	3 years, 202 days	True Whig Party	1901	Gibson	(Note: Vice President Summerville died in July 27, 1905 following his and President Gibson's reelection but prior to their inauguration. As no mechanism existed for replacing a vice president, which would have left Gibson without a vice president for his entire term, a constitutional amendment was ratified that year allowing for the president to call a special election in the absence of a vice president to fill the vacancy. J. J. Dossen won the special election in 1905 and was inaugurated along with Gibson in 1906.)
15		Joseph D. Summerville (1860–1905)	January 6, 1902	July 27, 1905^{[†]}	3 years, 202 days	True Whig Party	1903	A. Barclay	
Vacancy by death			July 27, 1905	January 1, 1906			1903	A. Barclay	
16		James Jenkins Dossen (1866–1924)	January 1, 1906	January 1, 1912	6 years	True Whig Party	1905	A. Barclay	
16		James Jenkins Dossen (1866–1924)	January 1, 1906	January 1, 1912	6 years	True Whig Party	1907	A. Barclay	
17		Samuel George Harmon (1861–1925)	January 1, 1912	January 5, 1920	8 years, 4 days	True Whig Party	1911	Howard	
17		Samuel George Harmon (1861–1925)	January 1, 1912	January 5, 1920	8 years, 4 days	True Whig Party	1915	Howard	
18		Samuel Alfred Ross (1870–1929)	January 5, 1920	January 1, 1924	3 years, 361 days	True Whig Party	1919	King	
19		Henry Too Wesley (1877–1944)	January 1, 1924	January 2, 1928	4 years, 1 day	True Whig Party	1923	King	
20		Allen Yancy (1881–1941)	January 2, 1928	December 3, 1930 (Resigned)	2 years, 335 days	True Whig Party	1927	King	(Note: Both President King and Vice President Yancy resigned on December 3, 1930. Secretary of State Barclay was inaugurated as president, and Vice President James Skivring Smith Jr. was elected in a special election soon after.)
Vacancy by resignation			December 3, 1930	1930			1927	E. Barclay	(Note: Both President King and Vice President Yancy resigned on December 3, 1930. Secretary of State Barclay was inaugurated as president, and Vice President James Skivring Smith Jr. was elected in a special election soon after.)
21		James Skivring Smith Jr. (1891–1950)	1930	January 3, 1944	13–14 years	True Whig Party	1927	E. Barclay	
21		James Skivring Smith Jr. (1891–1950)	1930	January 3, 1944	13–14 years	True Whig Party	1931	E. Barclay	
21		James Skivring Smith Jr. (1891–1950)	1930	January 3, 1944	13–14 years	True Whig Party	1935	E. Barclay	
22		Clarence Lorenzo Simpson (1896–1969)	January 3, 1944	January 1, 1952	7 years, 363 days	True Whig Party	1943	Tubman	
23		William Tolbert (1913–1980)	January 1, 1952	July 23, 1971 (Ascended)	19 years, 203 days	True Whig Party	1951	Tubman	
23		William Tolbert (1913–1980)	January 1, 1952	July 23, 1971 (Ascended)	19 years, 203 days	True Whig Party	1955	Tubman	
23		William Tolbert (1913–1980)	January 1, 1952	July 23, 1971 (Ascended)	19 years, 203 days	True Whig Party	1959	Tubman	
23		William Tolbert (1913–1980)	January 1, 1952	July 23, 1971 (Ascended)	19 years, 203 days	True Whig Party	1963	Tubman	
23		William Tolbert (1913–1980)	January 1, 1952	July 23, 1971 (Ascended)	19 years, 203 days	True Whig Party	1967	Tubman	
Vacancy by ascension			July 23, 1971	April 1972			1971	Tolbert	(Note: President Tubman died following his and Tolbert's reelection in 1971, but prior to his inauguration. Tolbert served the remainder of Tubman's sixth term before being inaugurated for Tubman's elected seventh term.)
24		James Edward Greene (1914–1977)	April 1972	July 22, 1977^{[†]}	5 years, 112 days	True Whig Party	1971	Tolbert	
24		James Edward Greene (1914–1977)	April 1972	July 22, 1977^{[†]}	5 years, 112 days	True Whig Party	1975	Tolbert	
Vacancy by death			July 22, 1977	October 31, 1977			1975	Tolbert	
25		Bennie Dee Warner (1935–2024)	October 31, 1977	April 12, 1980 (Deposed)	2 years, 164 days	True Whig Party	1975	Tolbert	(Note: Warner was ousted along with the rest of the government by the Armed Forces of Liberia.)
Vacancy due to People's Redemption Council			April 12, 1980	January 6, 1986				(Note: During 1980–1981 Thomas Weh Syen was Doe's second-in-command in the military administration. Weh Syen was in charge on vice-presidential duties. After Weh Syen was executed on Doe's orders, he was replaced as Vice Head of State by Nicholas Podier.)	
26		Harry Moniba (1937–2004)	January 6, 1986	September 9, 1990 (Deposed)	4 years, 246 days	National Democratic Party	1985	Doe	
Vacancy due to First Liberian Civil War			September 9, 1990	August 2, 1997				(Note: Roland Diggs served as Vice President in the administration of Amos Sawyer from August 1990 to April 1991. He was succeeded in April 1991 by Peter Naigow, who also resigned. There were many Deputy Chairmen of the Council of State of Liberia during 1994–1997, including Dexter Bah Tahyor, Isaac Musa, Charles Taylor, G. V. Kromah, George Boley, Oscar Quiah and Tamba Taylor.)	
27		Enoch Dogolea (1951–2000)	August 2, 1997	June 24, 2000^{[†]}	2 years, 327 days	National Patriotic Party	1997	Taylor	
Vacancy by death			June 24, 2000	July 24, 2000			1997	Taylor	
28		Moses Blah (1947–2013)	July 24, 2000	August 11, 2003	3 years, 18 days	National Patriotic Party	1997	Taylor	
Vacancy by ascension			August 11, 2003	October 3, 2003			1997	Blah	
Vacancy due to Accra Peace Agreement			October 3, 2003	January 16, 2006				(Note: During this time, the National Transitional Government of Liberia was in charge of government duties. Vice-Chairman Wesley Momo Johnson assumed the duties and powers of the office of vice-president during part of this period.)	
29		Joseph Boakai (born 1944)	January 16, 2006	January 22, 2018	12 years, 6 days	Unity Party	2005	Sirleaf	
29		Joseph Boakai (born 1944)	January 16, 2006	January 22, 2018	12 years, 6 days	Unity Party	2011	Sirleaf	
30		Jewel Taylor (born 1963)	January 22, 2018	January 22, 2024	6 years	National Patriotic Party	2017	Weah	
31		Jeremiah Koung (born 1978)	January 22, 2024	Incumbent	2 years, 229 days	Unity Party	2023	Boakai	

== See also ==
- Lists of office-holders
- List of current vice presidents
