= James Skivring Smith =

Former President of Liberia

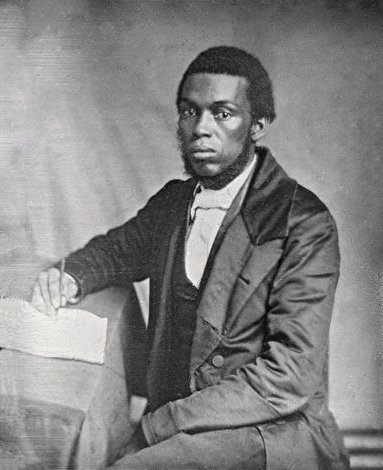

Superintendent of Grand Bassa County
- In office 1874–1884

6th President of Liberia
- In office November 4, 1871 – January 1, 1872
- Vice President: Vacant
- Preceded by: Edward James Roye
- Succeeded by: Joseph Jenkins Roberts

8th Vice President of Liberia
- In office January 3, 1870 – October 26, 1871
- President: Edward James Roye
- Preceded by: Joseph Gibson
- Succeeded by: Anthony W. Gardner

4th and 14th Secretary of State of Liberia
- In office 1856–1860
- President: Stephen Allen Benson
- Preceded by: Daniel Bashiel Warner
- Succeeded by: Edward Wilmot Blyden
- In office 1876–1877
- President: James Spriggs Payne
- Preceded by: James Elijah Moore
- Succeeded by: John W. Blackledge

Member of the Senate of Liberia from Grand Bassa County
- In office 1855–1860
- In office 1868–1869

Personal details
- Born: February 26, 1825 Charleston, South Carolina, United States
- Died: 1892 (aged 66-67) Buchanan, Liberia
- Party: True Whig
- Children: James Skivring Smith Jr.
- Parent(s): Carlos & Catharine Smith
- Education: University of Vermont College of Medicine (transferred); Berkshire Medical College (MD)
- Profession: Physician

James Skivring Smith (February 26, 1825 – 1892) was a Liberian politician who served as the sixth president of Liberia from 1871 to 1872. Prior to this, he served as the eighth vice president of Liberia from 1870 to 1871 under President Edward James Roye and as Secretary of State from 1856 to 1860 in the cabinet of President Stephen Allen Benson. After his presidency, he again served as Secretary of State from 1876 to 1877 under President James Spriggs Payne. For most of his political career, he was a member of the True Whig Party.

Smith was born in Charleston, South Carolina in 1825 to a family of free blacks. He arrived with his family in Liberia in 1833, and his parents died of malaria within a year. As a young man, he trained under Dr. James W. Lugenbeel, a medical doctor of the American Colonization Society. He then returned to the United States to study medicine at the University of Vermont College of Medicine. He transferred to Berkshire Medical College in Massachusetts, graduating with a medical degree in 1848. He was the second African American to receive a Doctor of Medicine from an American medical school, after David J. Peck a year earlier. After graduating, he returned to the newly independent Liberia to work as a physician.

In 1855, Smith was elected to the Senate, representing Grand Bassa County. From 1856 to 1860, he was Secretary of State under President Stephen Allen Benson. In the 1869 presidential election, Smith was elected vice president alongside President Edward James Roye. He and Roye were the first True Whig politicians to hold their respective offices. After Roye was deposed in the 1871 Liberian coup d'état, Smith served as president for the remainder of Roye's term from November 1871 to January 1872. His two-month presidency remains the shortest in Liberian history and the first fulfilled by a vice president. At the end of his presidency, Smith did not run for his own term and returned home to Buchanan, where he served as Superintendent of Grand Bassa County from 1874 to 1884. Between 1876 and 1877, he served as Secretary of State under President James Spriggs Payne. His son James Skivring Smith Jr. went on to serve as vice president from 1930 to 1944 under President Edwin Barclay.

== Early life and education ==
Smith was born in Charleston, South Carolina, on February 26, 1825, the fourth of seven children of free blacks Carlos and Catharine Smith. He and his family arrived in Liberia in 1833, and his parents died of malaria within one year of their arrival.

After working with a white doctor of the American Colonization Society, Smith returned to the United States to study medicine at the University of Vermont College of Medicine. He transferred to the Berkshire Medical College in Pittsfield, Massachusetts, from which he received his medical degree in 1848. He was the second African American to graduate from a medical school in the United States, after David J. Peck, who graduated from Rush Medical College in 1847. He then returned to the newly independent Liberia, working for the ACS as a doctor.

== Politics ==
Smith served as Secretary of State from 1856 to 1860 and was later elected as a senator from Grand Bassa County from 1868 to 1869. In the 1869 presidential election, Smith was elected vice president under President Edward James Roye. The two were the first True Whig politicians to hold their respective offices. On October 26, 1871, President Roye was forcibly removed from office after unconstitutionally extending his term, leading Smith to serve the remaining two months of Roye's original term as president. Smith's tenure as president remains the shortest in Liberian history. After leaving office, Smith returned to Buchanan and served as Superintendent of Grand Bassa County from 1874 to 1884 and Secretary of State from 1876 to 1877.

== Personal life ==
Smith's son, James Skivring Smith Jr., later became a successful politician in Liberia, also serving as Superintendent of Grand Bassa County and as vice president from 1930 to 1944.

Political offices
Preceded by James M. Priest	Vice President of Liberia; 1870–1871	Succeeded by Anthony W. Gardner
Preceded by Edward James Roye	President of Liberia; 1871–1872	Succeeded by Joseph Jenkins Roberts
