= Joseph J. Ross =

Liberian politician

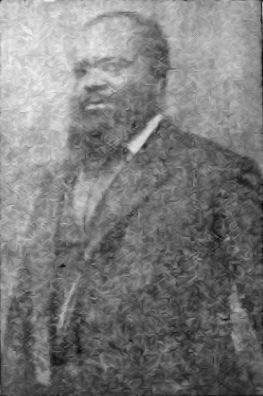
Ross in 1898.

Joseph J. Ross (December 1842 – October 24, 1899) was an Americo-Liberian politician and lawyer who served as the 14th vice president of Liberia from 1898 to 1899. He also served as Attorney General of Liberia under three separate administrations and was thrice elected to the Senate representing Sinoe County and serving as the president pro tempore of the Senate from 1892 to 1896.

Born in Georgia, United States, his mother died while he was in infancy. He emigrated to Liberia when he was eight years old in 1839 with his grandmother on the ship Huma. He settled in Sinoe County and later apprenticed to C. L. Parsons, who later served as Chief Justice of Liberia. After serving in the Liberian militia, Ross became an attorney under future Chief Justice Zacharia B. Roberts.

Ross unsuccessfully ran for the House of Representatives in Sinoe County in 1869 and was later appointed to a judgeship. In 1875, he was appointed superintendent of Sinoe County and was elected as a senator from Sinoe in 1878. From 1882 to 1884, he served as Attorney General in the cabinets of Presidents Anthony W. Gardner and Alfred Francis Russell and was reelected as senator from Sinoe County in 1883. He again served as Attorney General from 1888 to 1892 under President Hilary R. W. Johnson. In 1891, he was elected for a third time as a senator from Sinoe County, serving as the president pro tempore of the Senate.

Ross was elected as vice president in 1897, serving under President William D. Coleman. He was reelected in 1899 but died the same year. His son, Samuel Alfred Ross, also served as vice president in the 1920s.

Political offices
| Preceded by William D. Coleman | Vice President of Liberia; 1898–1899 | Succeeded by Joseph D. Summerville |
