= 1857 Liberian general election =

← 1855	May 1857	1859 →
- Presidential election
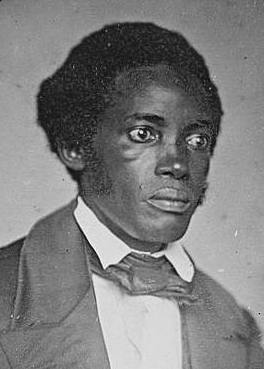
Nominee	Stephen Allen Benson
Party	True Liberian Party
President before election
Stephen Allen Benson
True Liberian Party
Elected President
Stephen Allen Benson
True Liberian Party

General elections were held in Liberia in May 1857. Incumbent President Stephen Allen Benson was the only candidate for the presidency, and was re-elected unopposed.
