= Edward Wilmot Blyden =

Liberian educator and politician (1832–1912)

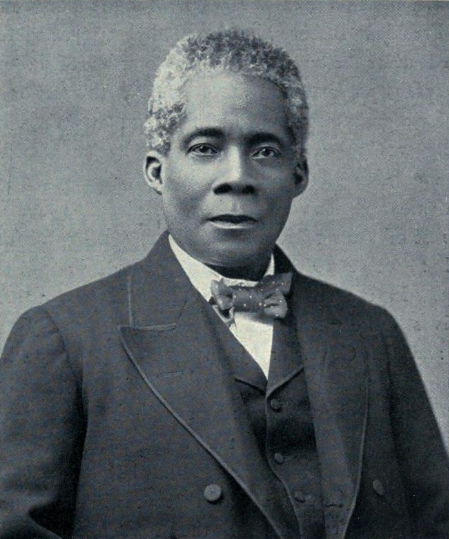
- Blyden c. 1887

7th Secretary of State of Liberia
- In office 1864–1865
- President: Daniel Bashiel Warner
- Preceded by: William Highland Lynch
- Succeeded by: Hilary R. W. Johnson

Personal details
- Born: 3 August 1832 Sankt Thomas, Danish West Indies
- Died: 7 February 1912 (aged 79) Freetown, British Sierra Leone
- Spouse: Sarah Yates
- Domestic partner: Anna Erskine
- Education: Alexander High School, Monrovia
- Occupation: Educator, writer, diplomat, politician
- Known for: "Father of Pan-Africanism"; Liberian ambassador and politician

Edward Wilmot Blyden (3 August 1832 – 7 February 1912) was an Americo-Liberian educator, writer, diplomat, and politician who was primarily active in West Africa. Born in the Danish West Indies, he joined the waves of black immigrants from the Americas who migrated to Liberia. Blyden became a teacher for five years in the British West African colony of Sierra Leone in the early twentieth century. His major writings were on pan-Africanism, which later became influential throughout West Africa, attracting attention in countries such as the United States as well. His ideas went on to influence the likes of Marcus Garvey, George Padmore and Kwame Nkrumah.

Blyden was recognised in his youth for his talents and drive; he was educated and mentored by John P. Knox, an American Protestant minister in Sankt Thomas who encouraged him to continue his education in the United States. In 1850, Blyden was refused admission to three Northern theological seminaries because of his race. Knox encouraged him to go to Liberia, a colony set up for free people of color by the American Colonization Society. Blyden emigrated in 1850 and made his career and life there. He married into a prominent family and soon started working as a journalist. Blyden's ideas remain influential to this day.

== Early life and education ==
Blyden was born on 3 August 1832 in Saint Thomas, Danish West Indies (now known as the American Virgin Islands), to free black parents who claimed descent from the Igbo people of present-day Nigeria. The family lived in an English speaking, Jewish neighborhood. Between 1842 and 1845, the family lived in Porto Bello, Venezuela, where Blyden discovered a facility for languages, becoming fluent in Spanish.

According to the historian Hollis R. Lynch, in 1845 Blyden met the Reverend John P. Knox, a white American, who became pastor of the St. Thomas Protestant Dutch Reformed Church. Blyden and his family lived near the church, and Knox was impressed with the studious, intelligent boy. Knox became his mentor, encouraging Blyden's considerable aptitude for oratory and literature. Mainly because of his close association with Knox, the young Blyden decided to become a minister, which his parents encouraged.

In May 1850, Blyden, accompanied by Reverend Knox's wife, went to the United States to enroll in Rutgers Theological College, Knox's alma mater. He was refused admission due to his race. Efforts to enroll him in two other theological colleges also failed. Knox encouraged Blyden to go to Liberia, the colony set up in the 1830s by the American Colonization Society (ACS) in West Africa, where he thought Blyden would be able to use his talents. Later in 1850, Blyden sailed to Liberia. One year later, Blyden enrolled in Alexander High School in Monrovia, where he studied theology, the classics, geography, mathematics, and Hebrew in his spare time. Blyden also acted as principal of the school when needed, and in 1858 he became the official principal of Alexander High School. That same year, Blyden was ordained as a Presbyterian minister.

Starting in 1860, Blyden corresponded with William Ewart Gladstone, who would later become a significant Liberal leader and Prime Minister of the United Kingdom. Gladstone offered Blyden an opportunity to study in England in 1861, but Blyden declined due to his obligations in Liberia.

== Marriage, family and legacy ==
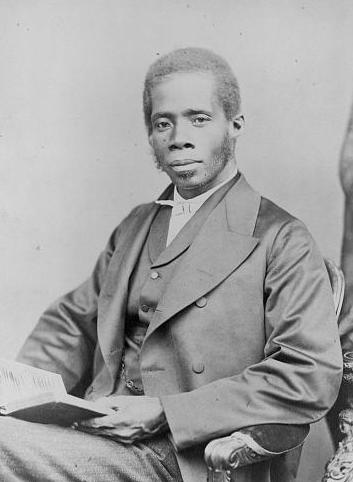
Blyden in London c. 1860s

Blyden married Sarah Yates, an Americo-Liberian from the prominent Yates family. She was the daughter of Hilary Yates and his wife. Sarah's paternal uncle, Beverly Page Yates, served as vice-president of Liberia from 1856 to 1860 under President Stephen Allen Benson. Blyden and Sarah had three children together.

Later, while living for several years in Freetown, Sierra Leone, Blyden had a long-term relationship with Anna Erskine, a Liberian woman from Clay-Ashland who had moved to Freetown in 1877. She was a granddaughter of James Spriggs-Payne, who was twice elected as the President of Liberia. Blyden and Erskine had five children together. In the 21st century, many Blyden descendants living in Sierra Leone identify as part of the Creole population. Among these descendants is Sylvia Blyden, publisher of the Awareness Times.

Blyden died on 7 February 1912 in Freetown, Sierra Leone, where he was buried at Racecourse Cemetery. In honor of him, the 20th-century Pan-Africanist George Padmore named his daughter Blyden.

== Career ==
Soon after his immigration to Liberia in 1850, Blyden began work in journalism. He began as a correspondent for the Liberia Herald (the only newspaper in Liberia at the time) and was appointed editor from 1855 to 1856, during which he also authored his first pamphlet, "A Voice From Bleeding Africa". He also spent time in British colonies in West Africa, particularly Nigeria and Sierra Leone, writing for early newspapers in both colonies. In Sierra Leone, he was the founder and editor of The Negro newspaper in the early 1870s. He maintained ties with the American Colonization Society and published in their African Repository and Colonial Journal.

In 1861, Blyden became professor of Greek and Latin at Liberia College. He was selected as president of the college, serving 1880–1884 during a period of expansion.

As a diplomat, Blyden served as an ambassador for Liberia to Britain and France. He also traveled to the United States, where he spoke to major black churches about his work in Africa. Blyden believed that Black Americans could end their suffering of racial discrimination by returning to Africa and helping to develop it. He was criticized by African Americans who wanted to gain full civil rights in their birth nation of the United States and did not identify with Africa.

In suggesting a redemptive role for African Americans in Africa through what he called Ethiopianism, Blyden likened their suffering in the diaspora to that of the Jews; he supported the 19th-century Zionist project of Jews returning to Palestine. In their book Israel in the Black American Perspective, Robert G. Weisbord and Richard Kazarian write that in his booklet The Jewish Question (published in 1898, the year after the First Zionist Congress) Blyden describes that while travelling in the Middle East in 1866 he wanted to travel to "the original home of the Jews–to see Jerusalem and Mt. Zion, the joy of the whole earth". While in Jerusalem he visited the Western Wall. Blyden advocated for the Jewish settlement of Palestine and chided Jews for not taking advantage of the opportunity to live in their ancient homeland. Blyden was familiar with Theodor Herzl and his book The Jewish State, praising it for expressing ideas that "have given such an impetus to the real work of the Jews as will tell with enormous effect upon their future history".

Later in life, Blyden became involved in Islam and concluded that it was a more "African" religion than Christianity for African Americans and Americo-Liberians.

Participating in the development of Liberia, Blyden served as the Secretary of State under President Daniel Bashiel Warner from 1864 to 1865. He later served as Secretary of the Interior under President Anthony W. Gardner from 1880 to 1882. Blyden contested the 1885 presidential election for the Republican Party but lost to True Whig incumbent Hilary R. W. Johnson.

From 1901 to 1906, Blyden directed the education of Sierra Leonean Muslims at an institution in Sierra Leone where he lived in Freetown. This is when he had his relationship with Anna Erskine; they had five children together. He became passionate about Islam during this period, recommending it to African Americans as the major religion most in keeping with their historic roots in Africa.

== Writings ==
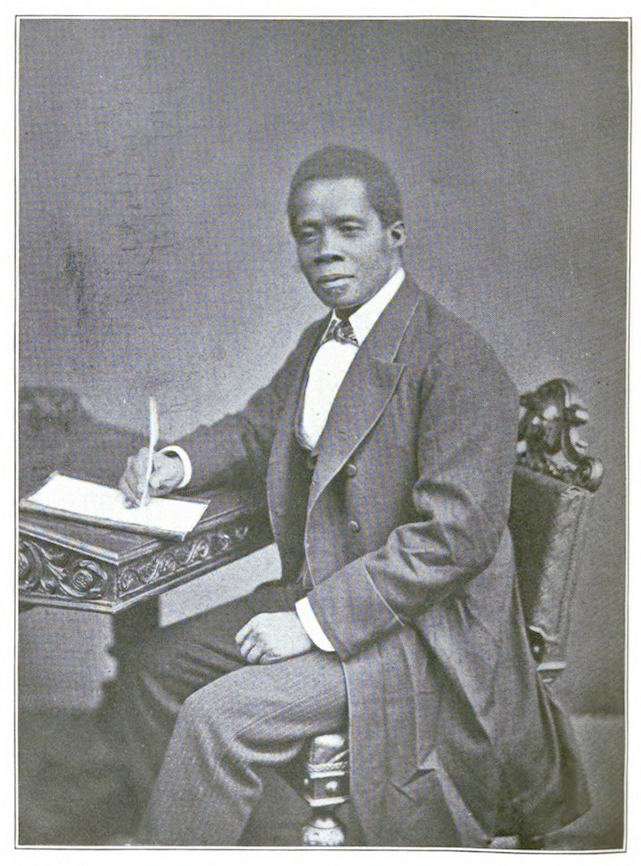
Blyden c. 1900 – c. 1904

As a writer, Blyden has been regarded by some as the "father of Pan-Africanism" and is noted as one of the first people to articulate a notion of "African Personality" and the uniqueness of the "African race". His ideas have influenced many 20th-century figures, including Marcus Garvey, George Padmore and Kwame Nkrumah. Blyden's major work, Christianity, Islam and the Negro Race (1887), promoted the idea that practicing Islam was more unifying and fulfilling for Africans than Christianity. Blyden believed that practicing Christianity had a demoralizing effect on Africans, although he continued to be a Christian. He thought Islam was more authentically African, as it had been brought to Sub-Saharan areas by people from North Africa.

His book quickly became controversial. At first, many people did not believe that an African had written it; his promotion of Islam was disputed. In later printings, Blyden included his photograph as the frontispiece.

His book included the following:

'Let us do away with the sentiment of Race. Let us do away with our African personality and be lost, if possible, in another Race.' This is as wise or as philosophical as to say, let us do away with gravitation, with heat and cold and sunshine and rain. Of course, the Race in which these persons would be absorbed is the dominant race, before which, in cringing self-surrender and ignoble self-suppression they lie in prostrate admiration.

Due to his belief in Ethiopianism and that African Americans could return to Africa and help in the rebuilding of the continent, Blyden saw Zionism as a model to look up to and supported the creation of a Jewish state in Israel, praising Theodor Herzl as the creator of "that marvelous movement called Zionism". Herzl died in 1904, some 44 years before the 1948 Arab–Israeli War.

== Works ==
=== Books ===
- Call of Providence to the Descendants of Africa in America", A Discourse Delivered to Coloured Congregations in the Cities of New York, Philadelphia, Baltimore, Harrisburg, during the Summer of 1862, in Liberia's Offering: Being Addresses, Sermons, etc., New York: John A. Gray, 1862.
- Christianity, Islam and the Negro Race, London, W. B. Whittingham & Co., 1887; 2nd edition 1888; University of Edinburgh Press, 3rd edition, 1967; reprint of 1888 edition, Baltimore, Maryland: Black Classic Press, 1994 (edition on Googlebooks).
- African Life and Customs, London: C. M. Phillips, 1908; reprint Baltimore, Maryland: Black Classic Press, 1994.
- West Africa Before Europe: and Other Addresses, Delivered in England in 1901 and 1903, London: C. M. Phillips, 1905.

=== Essays and speeches ===
- "Africa for the Africans", African Repository and Colonial Journal, Washington, DC: January 1872.
- "The Call of Providence to the Descendants of Africa in America", A Discourse Delivered to Coloured Congregations in the Cities of New York, Philadelphia, Baltimore, Harrisburg, during the Summer of 1862, in Liberia's Offering: Being Addresses, Sermons, etc., New York: John A. Gray, 1862.
- "The Elements of Permanent Influence", Discourse Delivered at the 15th St. Presbyterian Church, Washington, DC, Sunday, 16 February 1890, Washington, DC: R. L. Pendleton (published by request), 1890 (hosted on Virtual Museum of Edward W. Blyden).
- "Liberia as a Means, Not an End", Liberian Independence Oration: 26 July 1867; African Repository and Colonial Journal, Washington, DC: November 1867.
- "The Negro in Ancient History, Liberia: Past, Present, and Future", Methodist Quarterly Review, Washington, DC: M'Gill & Witherow Printer.
- "The Origin and Purpose of African Colonization", A Discourse Delivered at the 66th Anniversary of the American Colonization Society, Washington, DC, 14 January 1883, Washington, 1883.
- E. W. Blyden M.A., Report on the Falaba Expedition 1872, Addressed to His Excellency Governor J. Pope Hennessy, C.M.G., Published by authority Freetown, Sierra Leone. Printed at Government Office, 1872.
- "Liberia at the American Centennial", Methodist Quarterly Review, July 1877.
- "America in Africa," Christian Advocate I, 28 July 1898, II, 4 August 1898.
- "The Negro in the United States", A.M.E. Church Review, January 1900.

== See also ==
Pan-Africanism
