= Nathaniel Brander =

Liberian politician (1796–1870)

Nathaniel Brander (1796–1870) was an Americo-Liberian politician and jurist who served as the first vice president of Liberia from 1848 to 1850 under President Joseph Jenkins Roberts.

== Early life ==
Brander was born free in Petersburg, Virginia, United States, in 1796. He arrived in Sierra Leone under the auspices of the American Colonization Society (ACS) in March 1820. In 1839, he married Harriet Graves Waring, with whom he had one son, Albert. Waring's daughter, Jane Rose, later married Joseph Jenkins Roberts.

== Career ==
Brander briefly served as a colonial agent of the ACS in 1835. From 1843 to 1847, Brander served as an Associate Justice of the Supreme Court of Liberia. Upon Liberia's independence in 1847, Brander was elected as the first vice president alongside Joseph Jenkins Roberts, who was elected president. He served as Acting President in 1849 during Robert's diplomatic mission to the United Kingdom. Brander was challenged for the vice presidency in the 1849 elections by Secretary of State Daniel Bashiel Warner, former Colonial Agent Anthony D. Williams, and Congressman Beverly R. Wilson. No candidate received a majority of the vote, sending the election to the House of Representatives, which elected Williams as vice president.

Political offices
Preceded by Position created	Vice President of Liberia; 1848–1850	Succeeded by Anthony D. Williams
