= 1875 Liberian general election =

- May 1875
- Presidential election
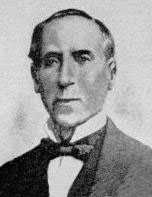

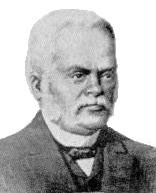
Nominee	James Spriggs Payne	Anthony W. Gardner
Party	Republican	TWP
President before election
Joseph Jenkins Roberts
Republican
Elected President
James Spriggs Payne
Republican

General elections were held in Liberia in May 1875. The presidential elections resulted in a victory for former President James Spriggs Payne of the Republican Party, who defeated Anthony W. Gardner of the True Whig Party.

Payne took office on 3 January 1876.
