= 1877 Liberian general election =

- May 1877
- Presidential election
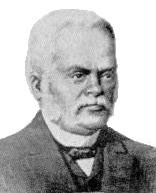
Nominee	Anthony W. Gardner
Party	TWP
President before election
James Spriggs Payne
Republican
Elected President
Anthony W. Gardner
TWP

General elections were held in Liberia in 1877. Anthony W. Gardner of the True Whig Party was the only candidate in the presidential elections, and was elected unopposed. Gardner took office on 7 January 1878. The election began the century-long political dominance of the True Whig Party.
