= 1851 Liberian general election =

- 1851
- Presidential election
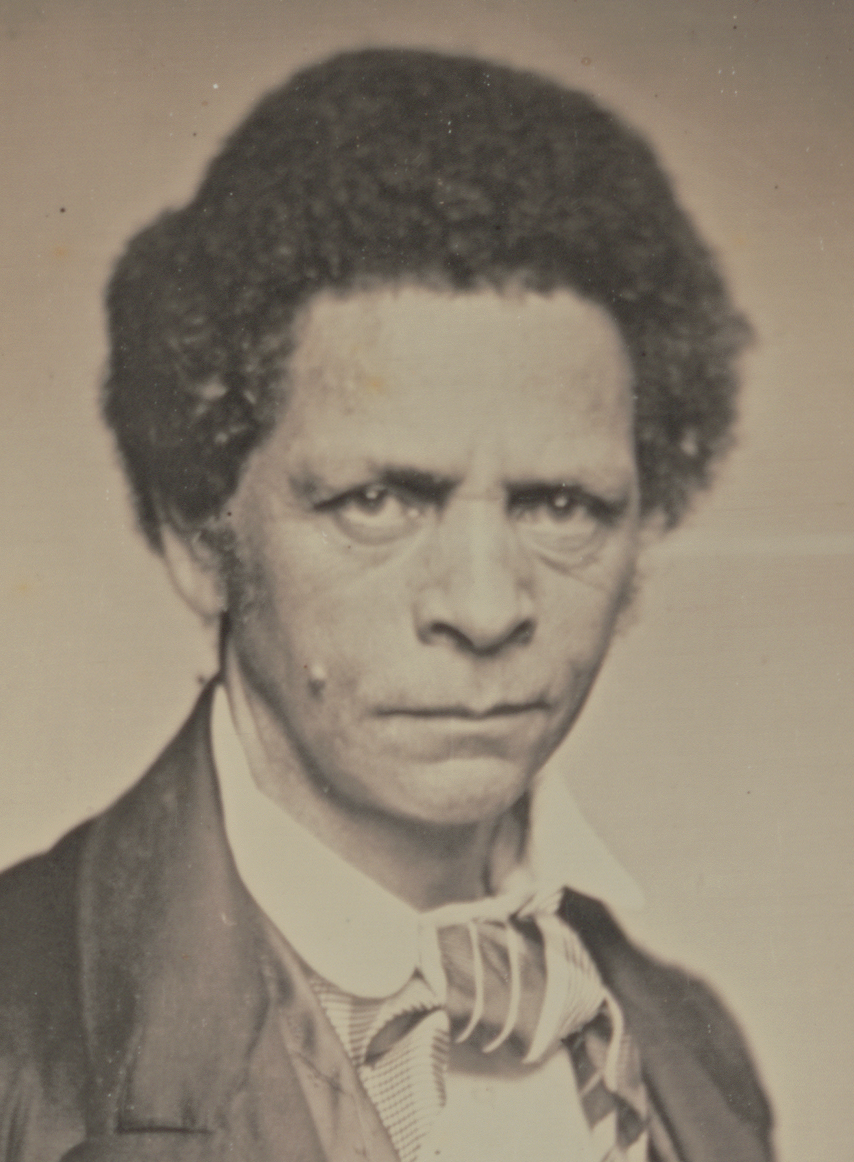

Nominee	Joseph Jenkins Roberts	Samuel Benedict
Party	True Liberian Party	Anti-Administration Party
President before election
Joseph Jenkins Roberts
True Liberian Party
Elected President
Joseph Jenkins Roberts
True Liberian Party

Presidential elections were held in Liberia in 1851. The result was a victory for incumbent President Joseph Jenkins Roberts of the True Liberian Party, over opposition leader Samuel Benedict.
