= Joseph D. Summerville =

Liberian politician

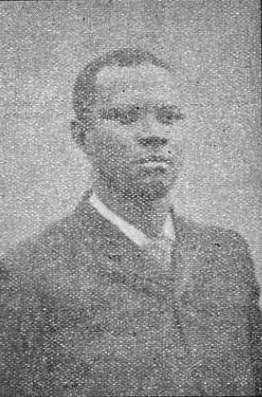
Summerville

Joseph D. Summerville (May 4, 1860 – July 27, 1905) served as the 15th vice president of Liberia from 1902 until his death in 1905. He served under Presidents Garretson W. Gibson and Arthur Barclay, making him the only person to serve as vice president under two separate presidents.

Born on May 4, 1860, in Buchanan, Grand Bassa County, Summerville was trained as a clerk. He later worked for several American and English foreign trade businesses. In 1886, he was appointed as auditor of Grand Bassa by President Hilary R. W. Johnson, and he successfully ran for the House of Representatives as a representative for Grand Bass in the 1887 elections. Upon completion of his term in 1889, he was commissioned as a major in the Liberian militia and was appointed superintendent of Grand Bassa County by President Johnson. He was later knighted as a Commander in the Order of African Redemption by President Joseph James Cheeseman. Summerville was elected as a senator from Grand Bassa in the 1893 elections, serving a single term. In 1898, he was again appointed superintendent of Grand Bassa by President William D. Coleman.

Summerville was elected vice president in the 1901 elections under President Garretson W. Gibson, and was reelected in 1903 and 1905 under President Arthur Barclay. However, Summerville died on July 27, 1905, prior to taking office for his third term. As no constitutional provision allowed for the replacement of a vice president, meaning that President Barclay would have been forced to serve his entire term without a vice president, the constitution was amended in 1905 to allow for a special election to be held in the event of the vice presidency's vacancy.

Political offices
Preceded by Joseph J. Ross	Vice President of Liberia; 1902–1905	Succeeded by James Jenkins Dossen
