= 1849 Liberian general election =

- 1 May 1849
- Presidential election
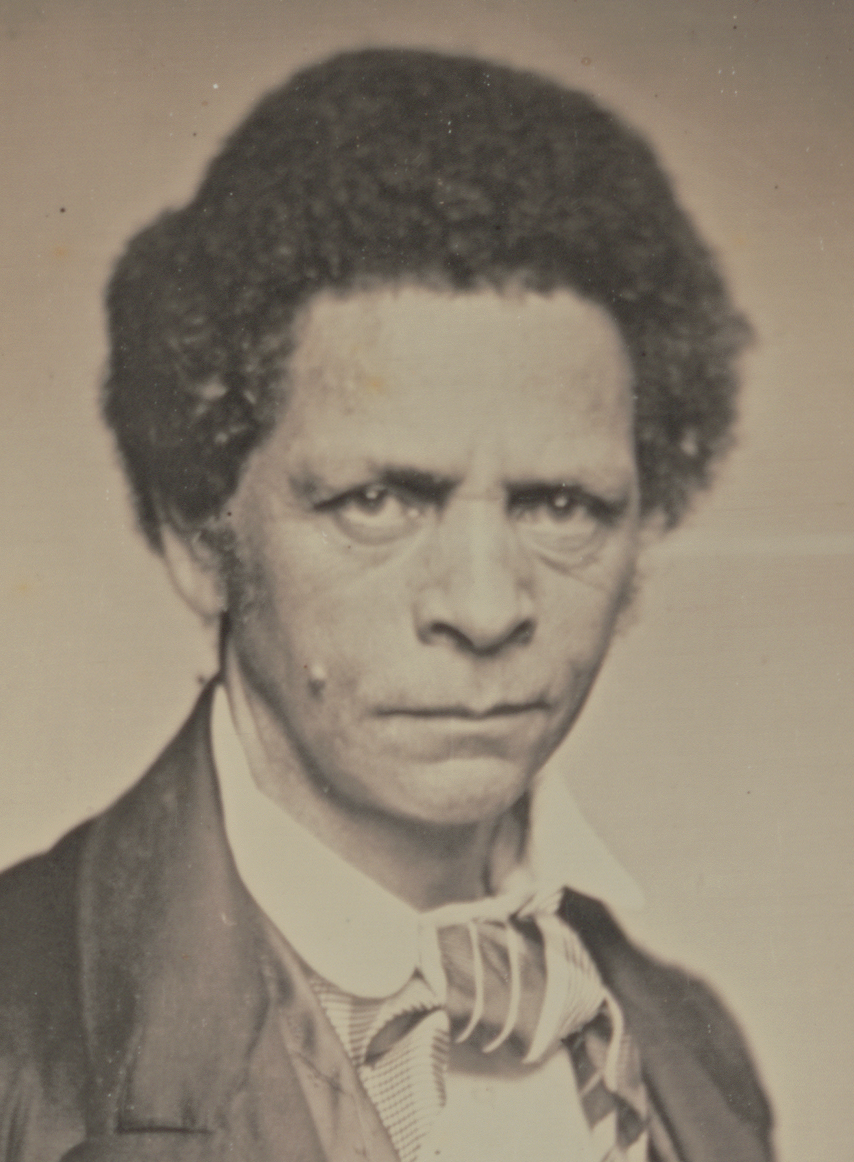

Nominee	Joseph Jenkins Roberts	Samuel Benedict
Party	True Liberian Party	Anti-Administration
President before election
Joseph Jenkins Roberts
True Liberian Party
Elected President
Joseph Jenkins Roberts
True Liberian Party

General elections were held in Liberia on May 1, 1849, alongside a constitutional referendum. The result was a victory for incumbent President Joseph Jenkins Roberts of the True Liberian Party, who defeated Samuel Benedict of the Anti-Administration Party.
