= 1853 Liberian general election =

- 1853
- Presidential election
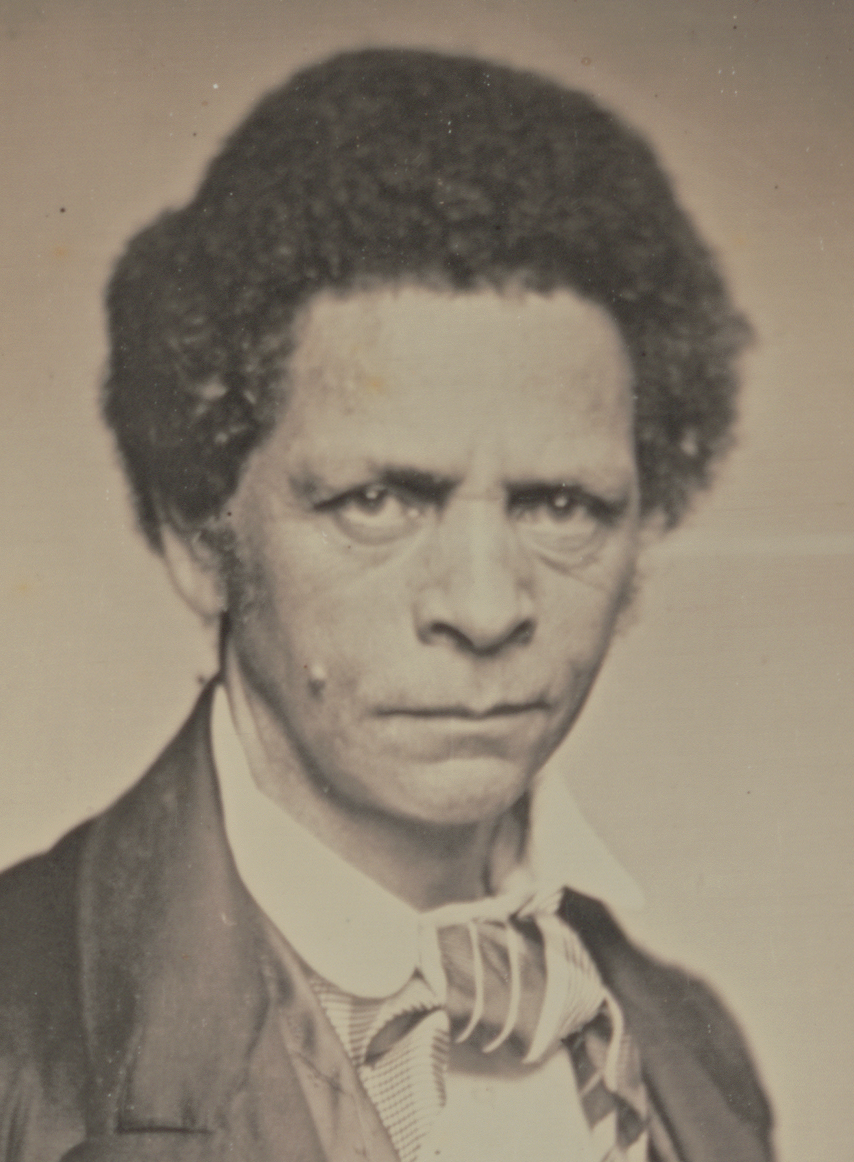

Nominee	Joseph Jenkins Roberts	Samuel Benedict
Party	True Liberian Party	Anti-Administration Party
President before election
Joseph Jenkins Roberts
True Liberian Party
Elected President
Joseph Jenkins Roberts
True Liberian Party

General elections were held in Liberia in 1853. The presidential election resulted in a victory for incumbent President Joseph Jenkins Roberts of the True Liberian Party again over opposition leader Samuel Benedict.
