= 1861 Liberian general election =

- 7 May 1861
- Presidential election
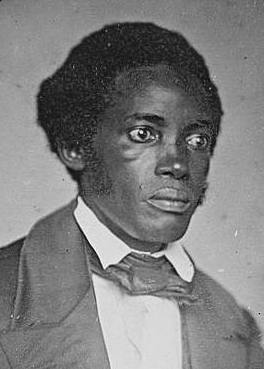
Nominee	Stephen Allen Benson
Party	Republican
President before election
Stephen Allen Benson
Republican
Elected President
Stephen Allen Benson
Republican

General elections were held in Liberia on 7 May 1861. Incumbent President Stephen Allen Benson was the only candidate for the presidency, and was re-elected unopposed.
