= Samuel Alfred Ross =

Liberian politician

Samuel Alfred Ross (October 29, 1870 – December 10, 1929) was an Americo-Liberian politician and journalist who served as the 18th vice president of Liberia from 1920 to 1924 under President Charles D. B. King. Born in Greenville, Sinoe County, Liberia, he was the son of Joseph J. Ross, a native of the United States and also a former vice president of Liberia. Prior to his vice presidency, Samuel Ross served in the Senate and as the Liberia's Attorney General. He was presbyterian.

After his political career, Ross was associate editor of the African Agricultural World from 1927 to 1929 and postmaster general from 1928 until his death in 1929. Like many Americo-Liberians, Ross was educated in the United States, studying at Lincoln University in Pennsylvania during the late 1880s.

Political offices
Preceded by Samuel George Harmon	Vice President of Liberia; 1920–1924	Succeeded by Henry Too Wesley
