= 1867 Liberian general election =

- 7 May 1867
- Presidential election
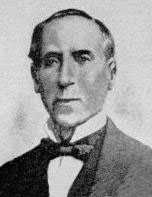

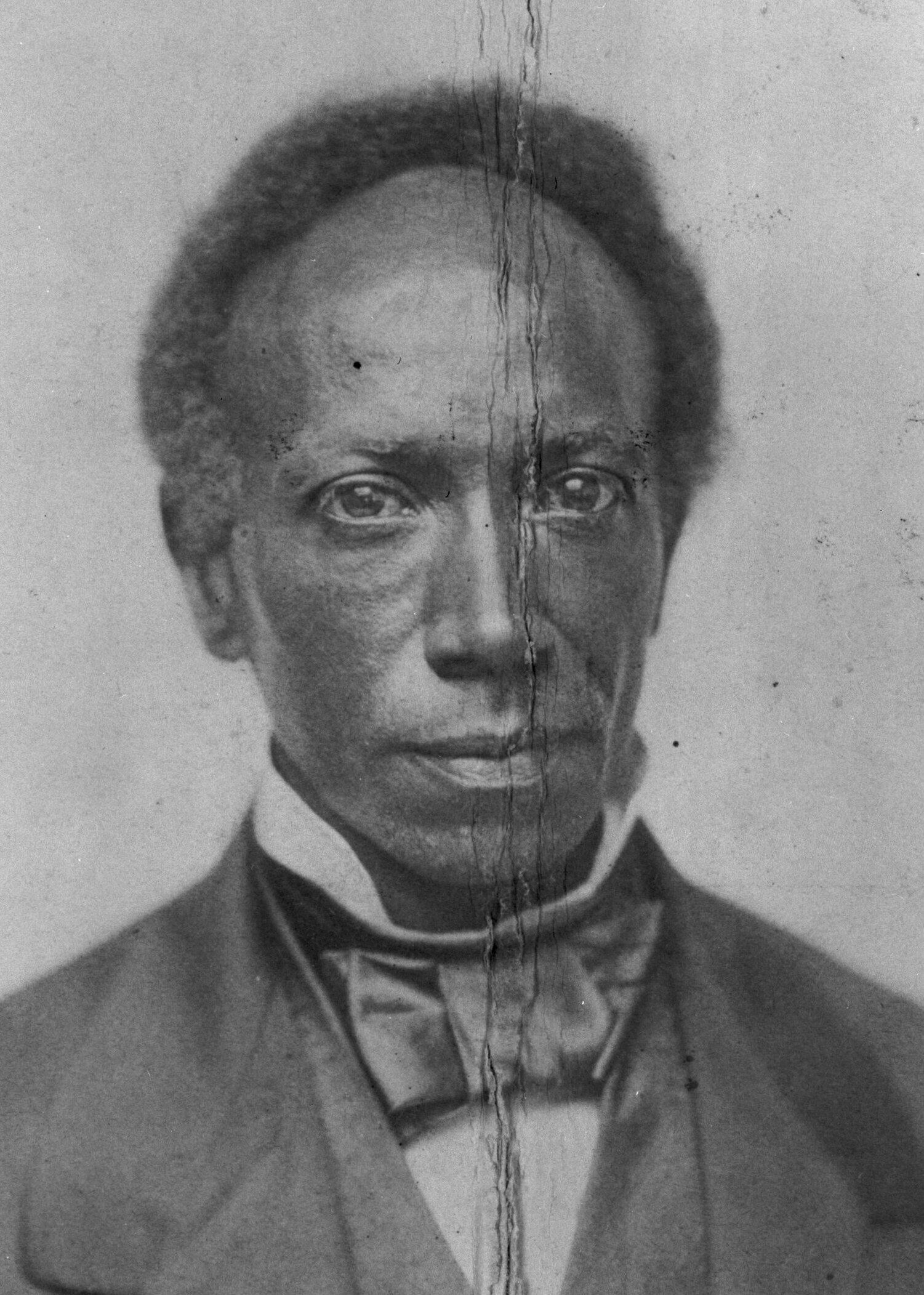

Nominee	James Spriggs Payne	Edward James Roye	James M. Moore
Party	Republican	Republican Whig Party	Whig Party
President before election
Daniel Bashiel Warner
Republican
Elected President
James Spriggs Payne
Republican

General elections were held in Liberia on 7 May 1867. The presidential election resulted in a victory for James Spriggs Payne of the Republican Party, defeating Republican Whig candidate Edward James Roye and former Speaker of the House James M. Moore. All candidates were born in the United States. The election was very close between Payne and Roye, with the House of Representatives required to decide the final outcome. Payne won the House of Representatives vote and took office on 6 January 1868.
