= John Day (Liberian judge) =

Liberian judge

2nd Chief Justice of Liberia
- In office 1854 – February 15, 1859
- Nominated by: Joseph Jenkins Roberts
- Preceded by: Samuel Benedict
- Succeeded by: Boston Jenkins Drayton

Personal details
- Born: February 18, 1797 Hicksford, Virginia, United States
- Died: February 15, 1859 (aged 61) Monrovia, Liberia
- Spouse: Polly Wickham

John Day (February 18, 1797 – February 15, 1859) was a Liberian politician and jurist who served as the 2nd Chief Justice of Liberia from 1854 until his death in 1859.

Born in Hicksford, Virginia, Day was the brother of Thomas Day, a famed American furniture designer and black businessman. After being licensed as a Baptist minister in 1821, he had planned to become a Baptist missionary in Haiti, but was unable to secure support among the Virginia Baptist establishment.

He traveled to Liberia in 1830 as part of the colonization effort by the American Colonization Society, where he was appointed by the Baptist Board of Foreign Missions as the head of their mission in Liberia. In addition to his preaching, he also served as a farmer and merchant. Within one year of his family's arrival in Liberia, his wife and all five of his children had died of disease.

Day served as a delegate from Grand Bassa County to Liberia's constitutional convention and signed both of its Declaration of Independence and its Constitution. He served as President Pro Tempore of the Senate of Liberia in the 1840s.

In 1854, he was appointed to the Supreme Court by President Joseph Jenkins Roberts, serving as the second Chief Justice of Liberia. He died in Monrovia on February 15, 1859.

Legal offices
Preceded by Samuel Benedict	Chief Justice of Liberia; 1854–1859	Succeeded by Boston Jenkins Drayton
