= Charles Harmon =

Liberian politician (died 1886)

Charles H. Harmon (died 1886) was the tenth vice president of Liberia from January 3, 1876, to January 7, 1878.

== Biography ==
Born in the United States, Harmon immigrated to Liberia at age six. Soon after this, he was made an orphan. Harmon was converted to Methodism by minister Francis Burns.

Harmon was ordained a deacon in 1869 and was admitted to the Liberia Annual Mission Conference in 1872. He served as president of the Conference in 1879, 1880, and 1883.

Harmon served in the Legislature of Liberia for ten years. In 1875, he was elected vice president of Liberia under Republican President James Spriggs Payne, during Payne's second presidency. Payne and Harmon were sworn in on January 3, 1876. On January 1, 1878, Payne was suspended from office following impeachment by the national legislature. Harmon served as acting president of Liberia for six days, until January 7, 1878 when Anthony W. Gardner was sworn in as president.

Harmon died in 1886 in Cape Palmas.

Political offices
Preceded by Anthony W. Gardner	Vice President of Liberia; 1876–1878	Succeeded by Alfred Francis Russell
