= James Priest =

James Priest may refer to:

- James Percy Priest (1900–1956), American teacher, journalist and politician
- James M. Priest (1819–1883), Vice President of Liberia

== See also ==
- James DePreist (1936–2013), American conductor
