= 1863 Liberian general election =

- 5 May 1863
- Presidential election
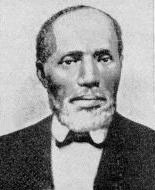

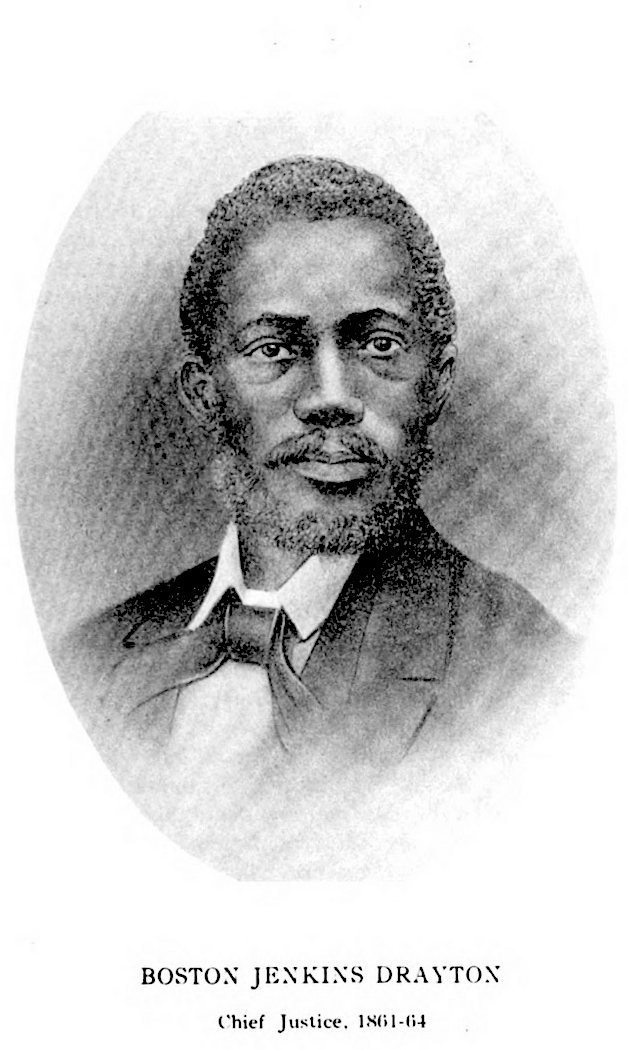
Nominee	Daniel Bashiel Warner	Boston Jenkins Drayton
Party	Republican	Anti-Administration
President before election
Stephen Allen Benson
Republican
Elected President
Daniel Bashiel Warner
Republican

General elections were held in Liberia on 5 May 1863. The presidential election resulted in a victory for Daniel Bashiel Warner of the Republican Party, defeating Chief Justice Boston Jenkins Drayton. Warner took office on 4 January 1864.
