= 1859 Liberian general election =

- May 1859
- Presidential election
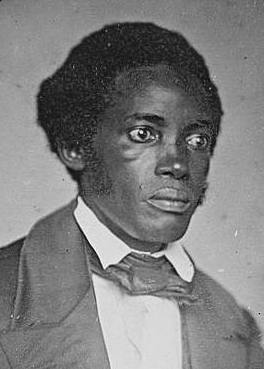
Nominee	Stephen Allen Benson
Party	Republican
President before election
Stephen Allen Benson
Republican
Elected President
Stephen Allen Benson
Republican

Presidential elections were held in Liberia in May 1859. Incumbent President Stephen Allen Benson was the only candidate for the presidency, and was re-elected unopposed.
