= 1855 Liberian general election =

- 1855
- Presidential election
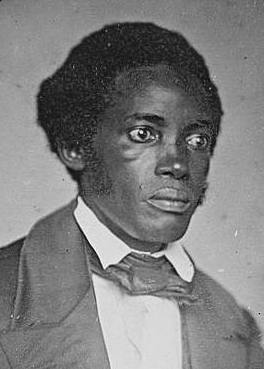

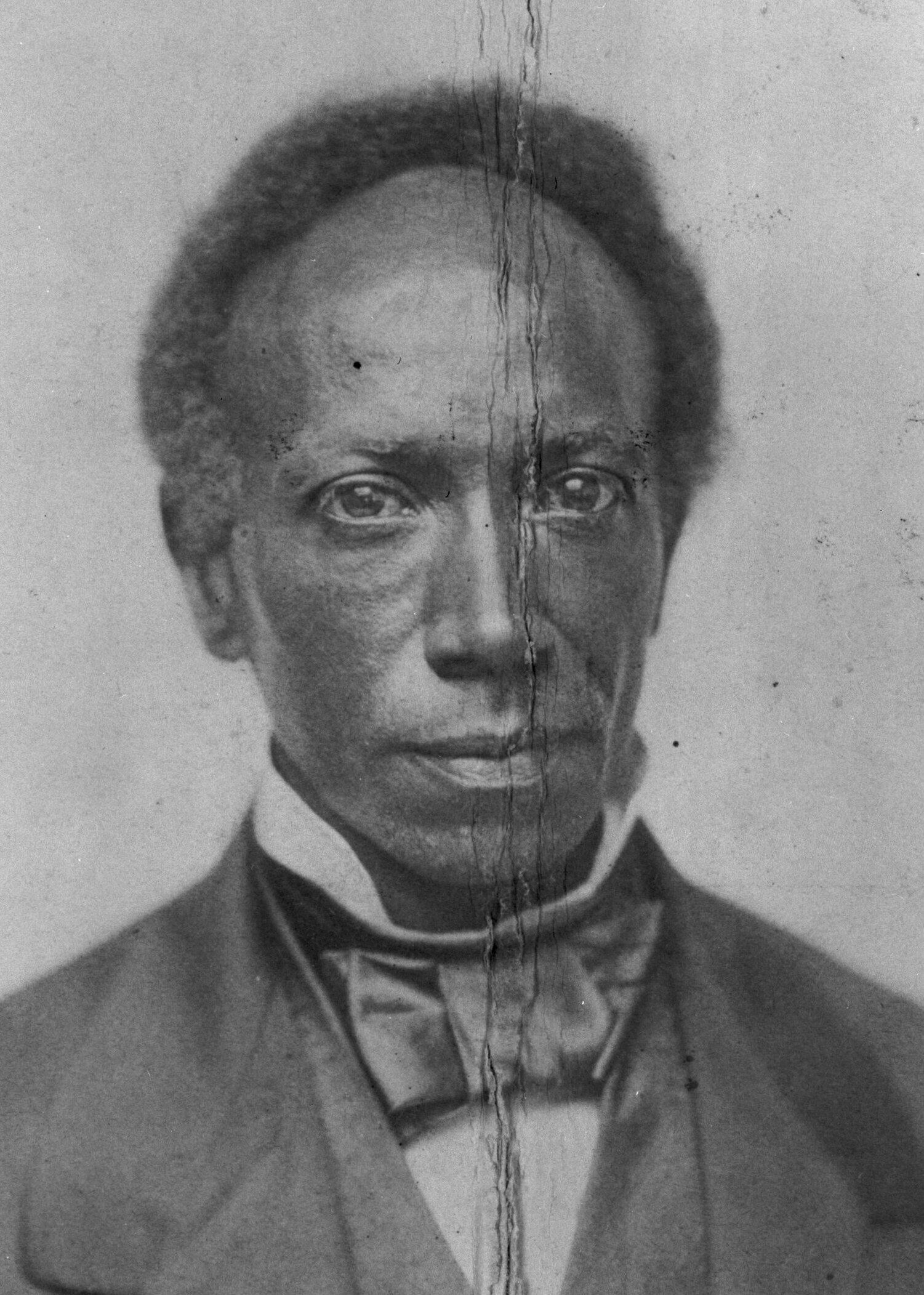
Nominee	Stephen Allen Benson	Edward James Roye
Party	True Liberian Party	Old Whig Party
President before election
Joseph Jenkins Roberts
True Liberian Party
Elected President
Stephen Allen Benson
True Liberian Party

General elections were held in Liberia in 1855 to elect the president of Liberia, with incumbent president Joseph Jenkins Roberts declining to run for a fifth term in office.

The presidential election resulted in a victory for Vice-President Stephen Allen Benson of the True Liberian Party, who defeated Edward James Roye of the Whig Party. Beverly P. Yates was elected vice-president.

Benson took office as the country's second president on 7 January 1856, with Roberts making a speech at Benson's inauguration.
