= 1883 Liberian general election =

- May 1883
- Presidential election
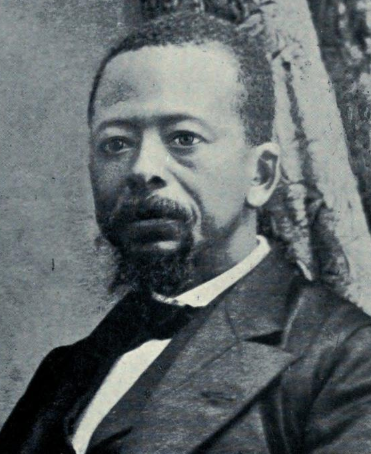
Nominee	Hilary R. W. Johnson
Party	TWP
Supported by	Republican Party
President before election
Anthony W. Gardner
True Whig Party
Elected President
Hilary R. W. Johnson
True Whig Party

General elections were held in Liberia in May 1883. Only one candidate, Hilary R. W. Johnson, contested the presidential election, and was supported by both the True Whig Party and the Republican Party. Following the elections Johnson declared himself to be a True Whig. He took office on 7 January 1884.
