= Joseph Gibson =

Liberian politician

Joseph Gibson (c. 1823–1886) was an Americo-Liberian politician who served as the seventh vice president of Liberia under President James Spriggs Payne.

== Biography ==
Gibson was born free in about 1823 in Talbot County, Maryland, United States. Gibson and several other family members emigrated to West Africa in 1835 under the auspices of the Maryland State Colonization Society. Gibson was an active leader in the community and became a leader in Maryland-in-Africa, which eventually achieved independence as the Republic of Maryland. Gibson served on the nine-person constitutional committee of the Republic of Maryland which based the constitution off of those of the United States and the U.S. state of Maryland. In June 1854, Gibson was appointed to the country's senate. However, the republic feared attacks from the Indigenous residents of the area and, in 1857, voted to join the Republic of Liberia.

Gibson was named the first superintendent of Maryland County, Liberia. From January 6, 1868, to January 3, 1870, Gibson served was the seventh vice president of Liberia under President James Spriggs Payne. He was a member of the Republican Party.
