= 1885 Liberian general election =

- 5 May 1885
- Presidential election
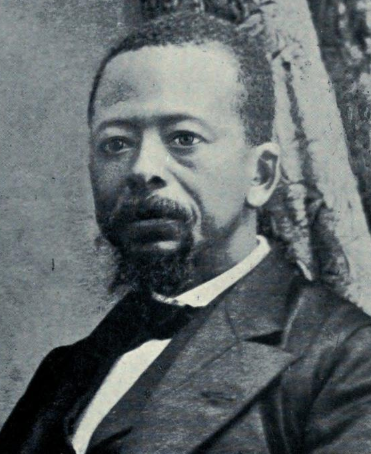

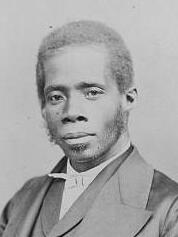
Nominee	Hilary R. W. Johnson	Edward Wilmot Blyden
Party	TWP	Republican
Popular vote	1,438	872
Percentage	62.25%	37.75%
President before election
Hilary R. W. Johnson
True Whig Party
Elected President
Hilary R. W. Johnson
True Whig Party

General elections were held in Liberia in May 1885. In the presidential election, the result was a victory for incumbent Hilary R. W. Johnson of the True Whig Party (the dominant ruling party at the time), who was re-elected for a second term.

== Results ==
=== President ===
Candidate	Party	Votes	%
Hilary R.W. Johnson	True Whig Party	1,438	62.25
Edward Wilmot Blyden	Republican Party	872	37.75
Total		2,310	100.00
Source: African Elections Database
