= 1873 Liberian general election =

- 6 May 1873
- Presidential election
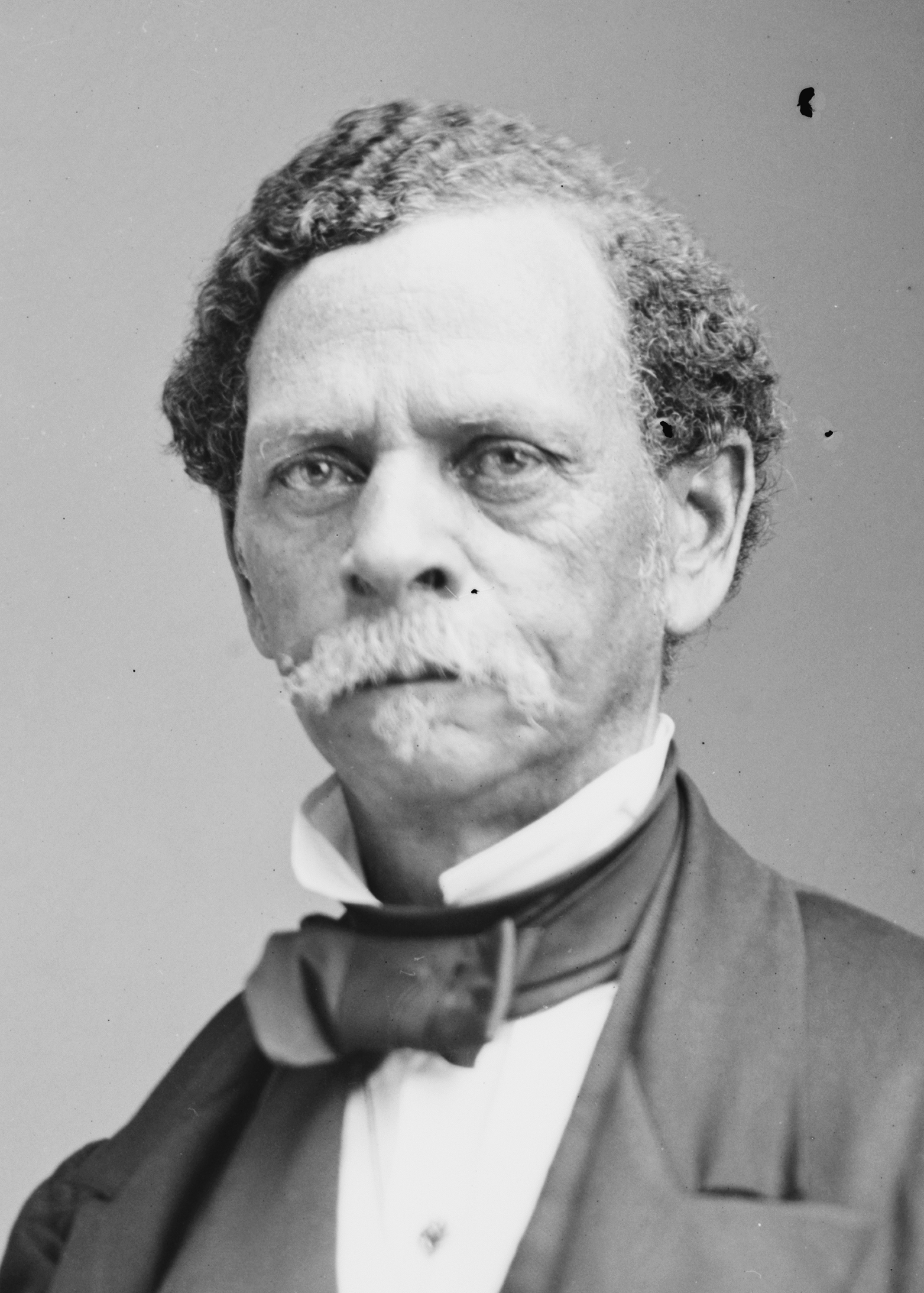
Nominee	Joseph Jenkins Roberts
Party	Republican
President before election
Joseph Jenkins Roberts
Republican
Elected President
Joseph Jenkins Roberts
Republican

General elections were held in Liberia on 6 May 1873. Incumbent President Joseph Jenkins Roberts of the Republican Party was the only candidate in the presidential elections, and was re-elected unopposed.
