= Trachylepis bensonii =

Conservation status
- Least Concern (IUCN 3.1)

Scientific classification
- Kingdom: Animalia
- Phylum: Chordata
- Class: Reptilia
- Order: Squamata
- Family: Scincidae
- Genus: Trachylepis
- Species: T. bensonii

Binomial name
- Trachylepis bensonii (W. Peters, 1867)
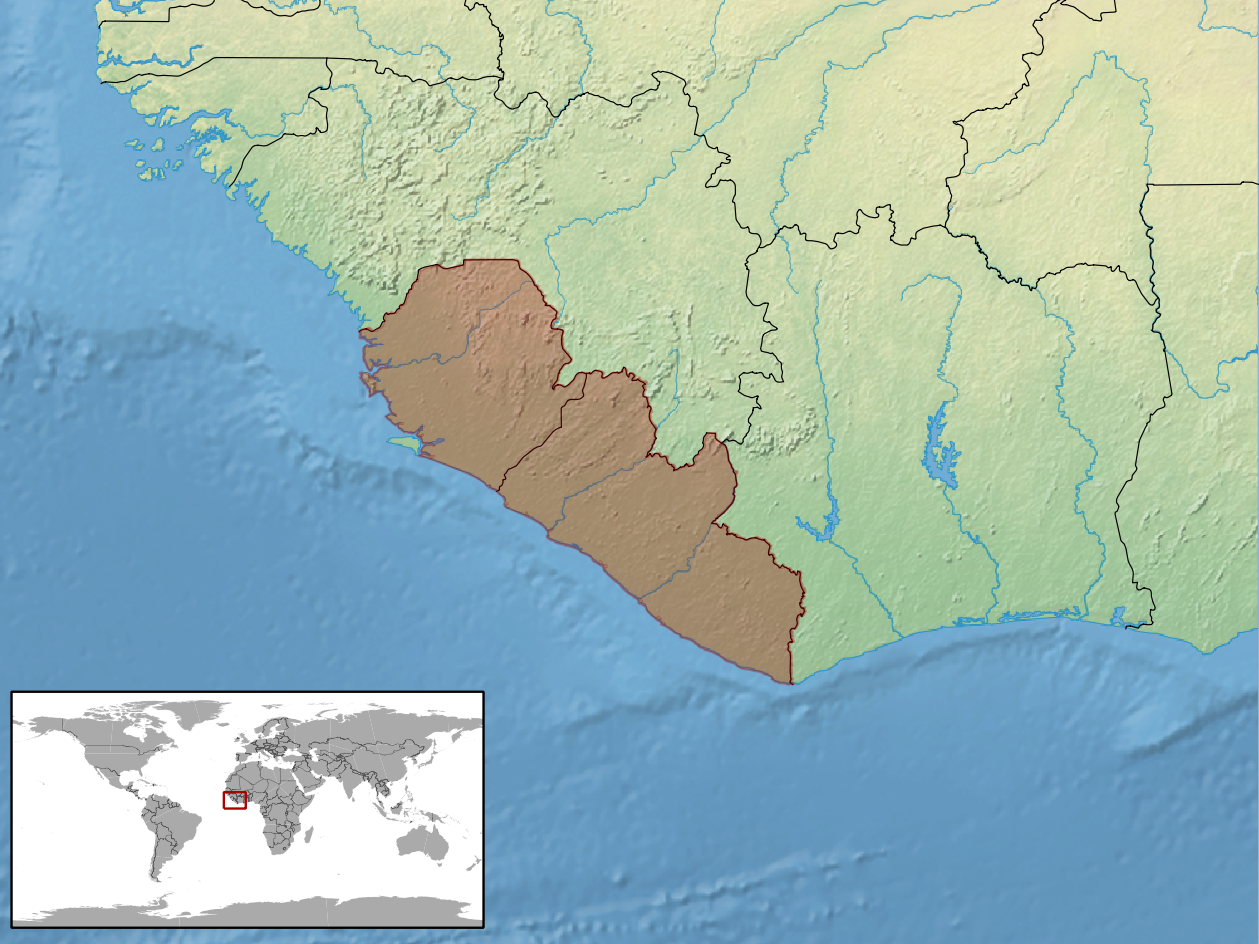

Synonyms
- Euprepes (Euprepis) Bensonii W. Peters, 1867; Mabuya bensonii — Greer et al., 2000; Trachylepis bensonii — Bauer, 2003

Species of lizard

Benson's mabuya (Trachylepis bensonii) is a species of skink, a lizard in the family Scincidae. The species is native to Western Africa.

== Etymology ==
The specific name, bensonii, is in honor of Stephen Allen Benson, who was President of Liberia from 1856 to 1864.

== Geographic range ==
T. bensonii is found in Liberia and Sierra Leone.

== Habitat ==
The preferred natural habitats of T. bensonii are forest, savanna, and rocky areas, at altitudes of 200–1,200 m (660–3,940 ft).

== Reproduction ==
T. bensonii is oviparous.
