= James Skivring Smith Jr. =

Liberian politician

James Skivring Smith Jr. (1891–1950) was a Liberian politician who served as the 21st vice president of Liberia from 1930 to 1944 under President Edwin Barclay. Prior to this, Smith served as superintendent of Grand Bassa County from 1924 to 1927. Smith was elected as vice president in a special election held in 1930 following the resignation of President Charles D. B. King and Vice President Allen Yancy after mass protests by Liberians and international accusations of government-backed forced labor practices at the Firestone rubber plantation in Liberia. Smith was the son of James Skivring Smith, who served as vice president and president of Liberia in the 19th century.

Political offices
Preceded by Allen Yancy	Vice President of Liberia; 1930–1944	Succeeded by Clarence Lorenzo Simpson
