= 1865 Liberian general election =

- May 1865
- Presidential election
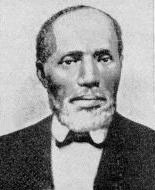
| Nominee | Daniel Bashiel Warner |
| Party | Republican |
President before election
Daniel Bashiel Warner
Republican
Elected President
Daniel Bashiel Warner
Republican

General elections were held in Liberia in May 1865. Incumbent President Daniel Bashiel Warner of the Republican Party was the only candidate for the presidency, and was re-elected unopposed.
