= Samuel George Harmon =

Liberian politician

Samuel George Harmon (c. 1861 – c. 1929) was a Liberian politician who served as the 17th vice president of Liberia from 1912 to 1920, under President Daniel Edward Howard. He was a member of the True Whig Party which dominated Liberian politics from 1878 to 1980. In the 1923 election, Harmon unsuccessfully ran for president with the opposition People's Party against incumbent president Charles D. B. King. He was the Secretary of the Treasury from 1928 until his death.
