= Hilary R. W. Johnson =

Former President of Liberia

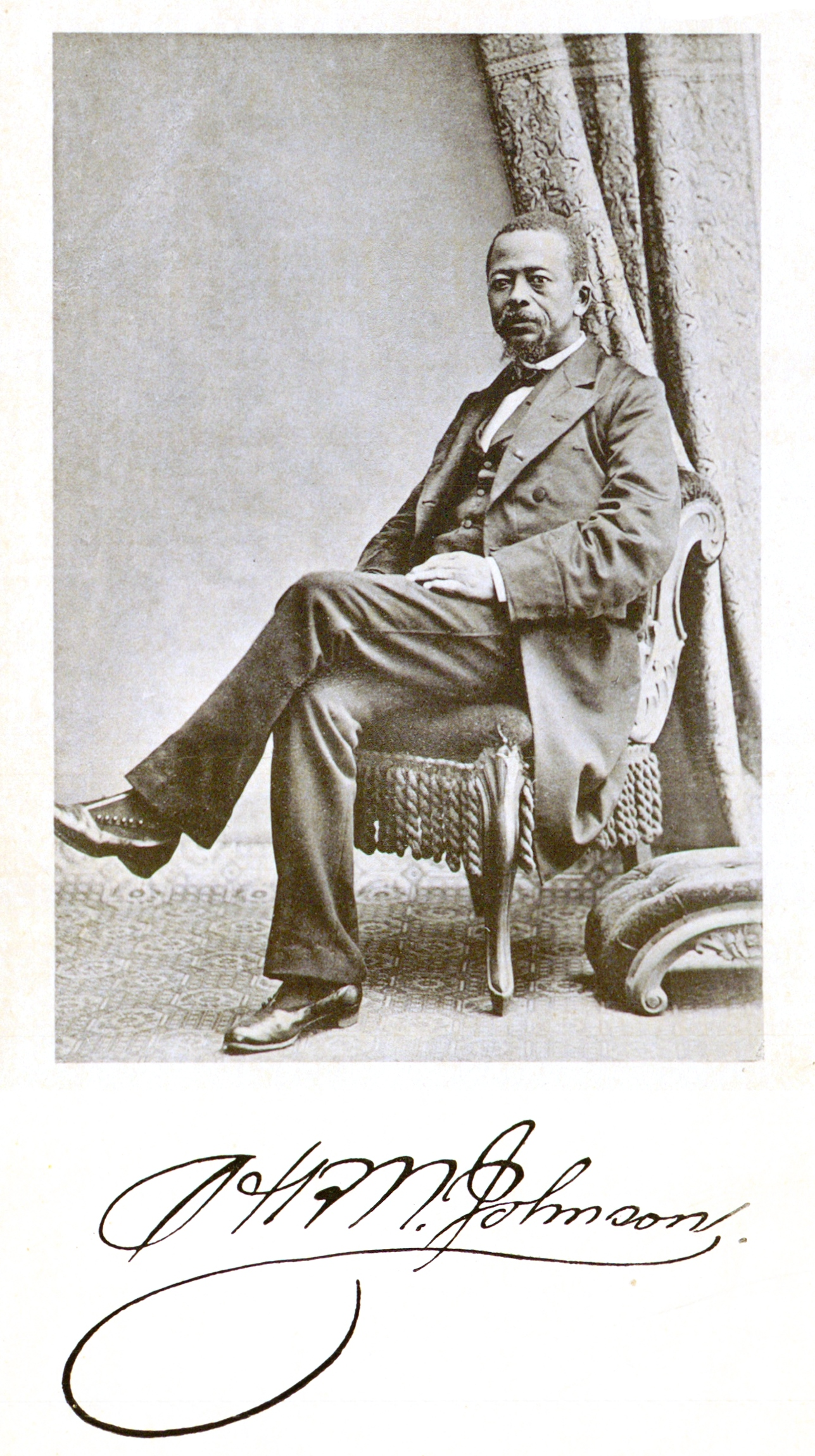

11th President of Liberia
- In office January 7, 1884 – January 4, 1892
- Vice President: James Thompson
- Preceded by: Alfred Francis Russell
- Succeeded by: Joseph James Cheeseman

8th, 12th, and 16th Secretary of State of Liberia
- In office 1866–1867
- President: Daniel Bashiel Warner
- Preceded by: Edward Wilmot Blyden
- Succeeded by: John N. Lewis
- In office 1871–1874
- President: Edward James Roye; James Skivring Smith; Joseph Jenkins Roberts
- Preceded by: John N. Lewis
- Succeeded by: James Elijah Moore
- In office 1877–1878
- President: James Spriggs Payne
- Preceded by: John W. Blackledge
- Succeeded by: Garretson W. Gibson

Personal details
- Born: Hilary Richard Wright Johnson; June 1, 1837 Monrovia, Liberia
- Died: February 28, 1901 (aged 63) Monrovia, Liberia
- Party: True Whig

Hilary Richard Wright Johnson (June 1, 1837 – February 28, 1901) served as the 11th president of Liberia from 1884 to 1892. He was elected four times. He was the first Liberian president to be born in Africa. He had served three times as Secretary of State and once as Secretary of the Interior prior to becoming president.

== Early life and education ==
Of Americo-Liberian ancestry, Johnson was born in Monrovia in the colony. His parents were Elijah Johnson, one of the original African-American settlers who founded the colony at Cape Mesurado, and his second wife Rachel Wright (b. 1798), another early settler. Johnson was educated in the colony at Alexander High School and later taught at Liberia College, with his later political adversary, Edward Wilmot Blyden.

== Marriage and career ==
After establishing his career, Johnson married and had a family. His son Frederick Eugene Richelieu Johnson, known as Frederick E. R. Johnson, became an attorney and a Chief Justice of the country, serving 1929–1933.

Johnson became politically active. He was appointed Secretary of State by President Edward James Roye, an African-American who had emigrated to Liberia the year before independence in 1847.

In 1884 Johnson was nominated by both the Republican Party and True Whig parties, Johnson ran unopposed in his first election. After his victory, he declared himself a True Whig. He was the first Liberian president to have been born on the African continent.

The endorsement of Johnson by these two political parties—which generally represented opposite sides of the color divide within the Americo-Liberian community—signaled a truce regarding colorism. There had been tensions between the mixed-race or mulatto settlers and those of darker skin, who had less obvious European ancestry, if any. The community worked together to concentrate their political power and economic wealth in the country.

== Presidency (1884-1892) ==
In the decades after 1868, escalating economic difficulties weakened the state government's dominance over the coastal indigenous population. Conditions worsened, as the cost of imports was far greater than the income generated by exports of commodity crops such as coffee, rice, palm oil, sugarcane, and timber. Liberia tried desperately to modernize its largely agricultural economy.

In 1885, Johnson agreed to the annexation of the Gallinas territory by the British Crown via their colony of Sierra Leone after the US Government had advised him to yield to the British demands. In November of that year, the Havelock Draft Convention, which finalized the boundary between Liberia and Sierra Leone, was ratified by both Liberia and Great Britain. Since then, the Mano River has formed the boundary between Liberia and Sierra Leone.

=== Internal uprising ===
In an 1886 message to the United States Congress, U.S. President Grover Cleveland spoke of the "moral right and duty of the United States" to help Liberia. "It must not be forgotten that this distant community is an offshoot of our own system," he said. But when Liberia asked for military assistance against an internal uprising, which the French were thought to have helped instigate, Cleveland's secretary of state refused. He said that Liberia lacked standing as a country to make such a request.

Some indigenous Liberian peoples living in the hinterland of Montserrado County and further north continued resistance and warfare until the late 1890s. The Gola and Mandingo fought over control of trading routes in the region. At the same time, various factions of the Gola people were fighting with each other.

== See also ==
- History of Liberia

Political offices
Preceded by Alfred Francis Russell	President of Liberia; 1884 – 1892	Succeeded by Joseph James Cheeseman
