= David J. Peck =

American physician

David Jones Peck (c. 1826–1855) was an American medical doctor. He was the first African American to receive a Doctor of Medicine from an American medical school. He graduated in 1847 from Rush Medical College in Chicago.

== Biography ==
Peck, a native of Carlisle, Pennsylvania, was born to Sarah Jones Peck and John C. Peck (1802–1875), a prominent abolitionist of Pittsburgh, Pennsylvania. John Peck, a native of Hagerstown, Maryland, was a barber, wigmaker, and minister who was active in cultural and antislavery activities in and around Pittsburgh, where he lived after 1837.

From about 1844 to 1846, David Peck studied medicine under Dr. Joseph P. Gazzam, a white anti-slavery physician. After his two years of study with Gazzam, Peck entered Rush Medical College, Chicago, Illinois, in autumn 1846, and graduated in 1847. During the summer after graduation, Peck toured the state of Ohio with William Lloyd Garrison and Frederick Douglass.

He set up a medical practice in Philadelphia in 1848. He married Mary Lewis in Chicago in 1849. When his medical practice in Philadelphia proved unsuccessful, he returned to Pittsburgh in 1850.

At the suggestion of Martin R. Delany, Peck moved to San Juan del Norte, Nicaragua, in early 1852.

Peck was killed in spring 1855 in a skirmish between Democratic forces and their Republican rivals at Jalteva, Nicaragua (near Granada) in the Filibuster War. The latter forces had been deposed after an election in 1854. Peck's death is recollected by Charles William Doubleday (1829–1909) in Chapter 4 of his Reminiscences of the 'Filibuster' War in Nicaragua. Peck died as the result of concussion injuries sustained when a Republican cannonier fired on the position from which Doubleday and Peck had been observing their activities.
