= James M. Priest =

Liberian lawyer and politician (1819–1883)

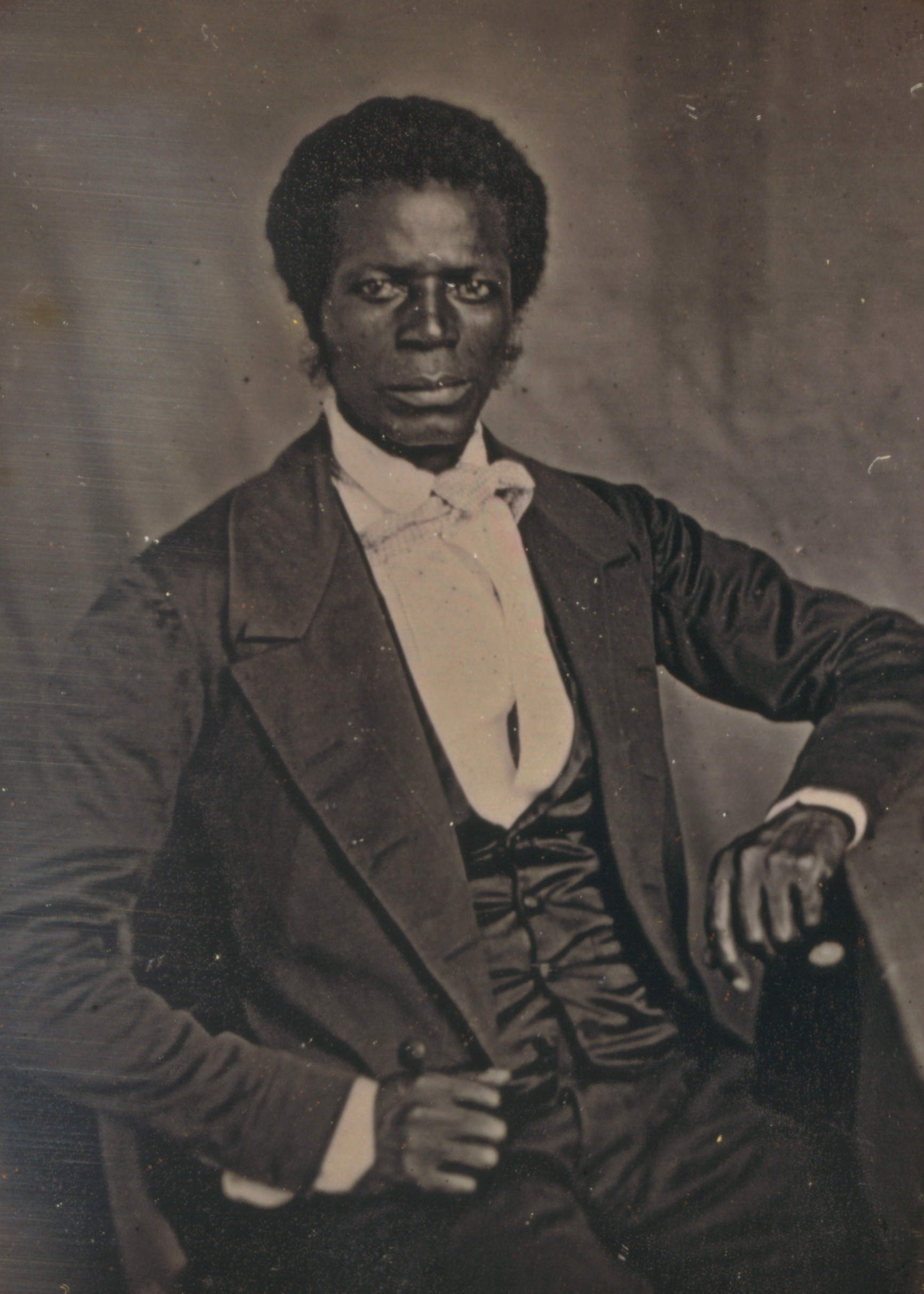
Portrait of Priest by Augustus Washington

James Mux Priest (July 8, 1819 – May 16, 1883) was the sixth vice president of Liberia from 1864 to 1868 under President Daniel Bashiel Warner. He was born enslaved in the U.S. state of Kentucky. Slaveowner Jane Anderson Meaux educated and freed Priest and sent him to Liberia to evaluate the situation of former enslaved people living in Liberia. He returned to the U.S. and received more education and became a Presbyterian missionary. In 1843, he emigrated to Liberia under the auspices of the American Colonization Society.

He later became a justice of the Liberian Supreme Court.

Political offices
Preceded by Beverley Yates	Vice President of Liberia; 1864–1868	Succeeded by James Skivring Smith
