= Samuel Benedict =

Liberian judge

1st Chief Justice of Liberia
- In office 1847–1854
- Nominated by: Joseph Jenkins Roberts
- Succeeded by: John Day

Personal details
- Born: c. 1792 Georgia, United States
- Died: 1854 Monrovia, Liberia

Samuel Benedict (c. 1792–1854) was a Liberian politician and jurist who served as the 1st Chief Justice of Liberia. He was born a slave in the U.S. state of Georgia in 1792, and purchased his freedom and that of his family. He emigrated to Liberia in 1835, on the ship Indiana.

Prior to Liberia's independence, Benedict was a judge of the Superior Court and a merchant. He later presided over the Liberian Constitutional Convention of 1847, which officially declared Liberia's independence from the American Colonization Society. He was one of Montserrado County's delegates at the convention and a signer of the Liberian Declaration of Independence.

Representing the Anti-Administration Party (AAP), Benedict was defeated by longtime political foe Joseph Jenkins Roberts in the first four presidential elections, from 1847 to 1853.

Benedict later became the first Chief Justice of the Liberian Supreme Court. He died in 1854.

Legal offices
| Preceded by None | Chief Justice of Liberia; 1847 – 1854 | Succeeded by John Day |
