= Thomas Buchanan (governor of Liberia) =

American politician (1808–1841)

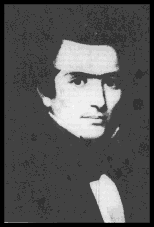

1st Governor of Liberia
- In office April 1, 1839 – September 3, 1841
- Preceded by: Jehudi Ashmun
- Succeeded by: Joseph Jenkins Roberts

Personal details
- Born: November 19, 1808
- Died: September 3, 1841 (aged 32) Monrovia, Liberia

Thomas Buchanan (November 19, 1808 – September 3, 1841) was an American politician and diplomat who served as the first official governor of Liberia for the American Colonization Society. He was a relative of James Buchanan, who later became the 15th president of the United States.

== Career ==
Buchanan served in the 1830s as the envoy of the American Colonization Society (ACS) to the colony of Liberia, which was founded by the ACS on the coast in West Africa in 1821. He worked first as an administrator in Grand Bassa before moving to Monrovia in 1839. On April 1, Buchanan was appointed as the first governor of the colony, serving until his death on September 3, 1841. He died from a fever—either yellow fever or malaria—and is buried in Monrovia.

== Legacy ==
He is the namesake of Buchanan, Liberia, the seat of Grand Bassa County.
