= Beverly Page Yates =

American-Liberian politician (1811–1883)

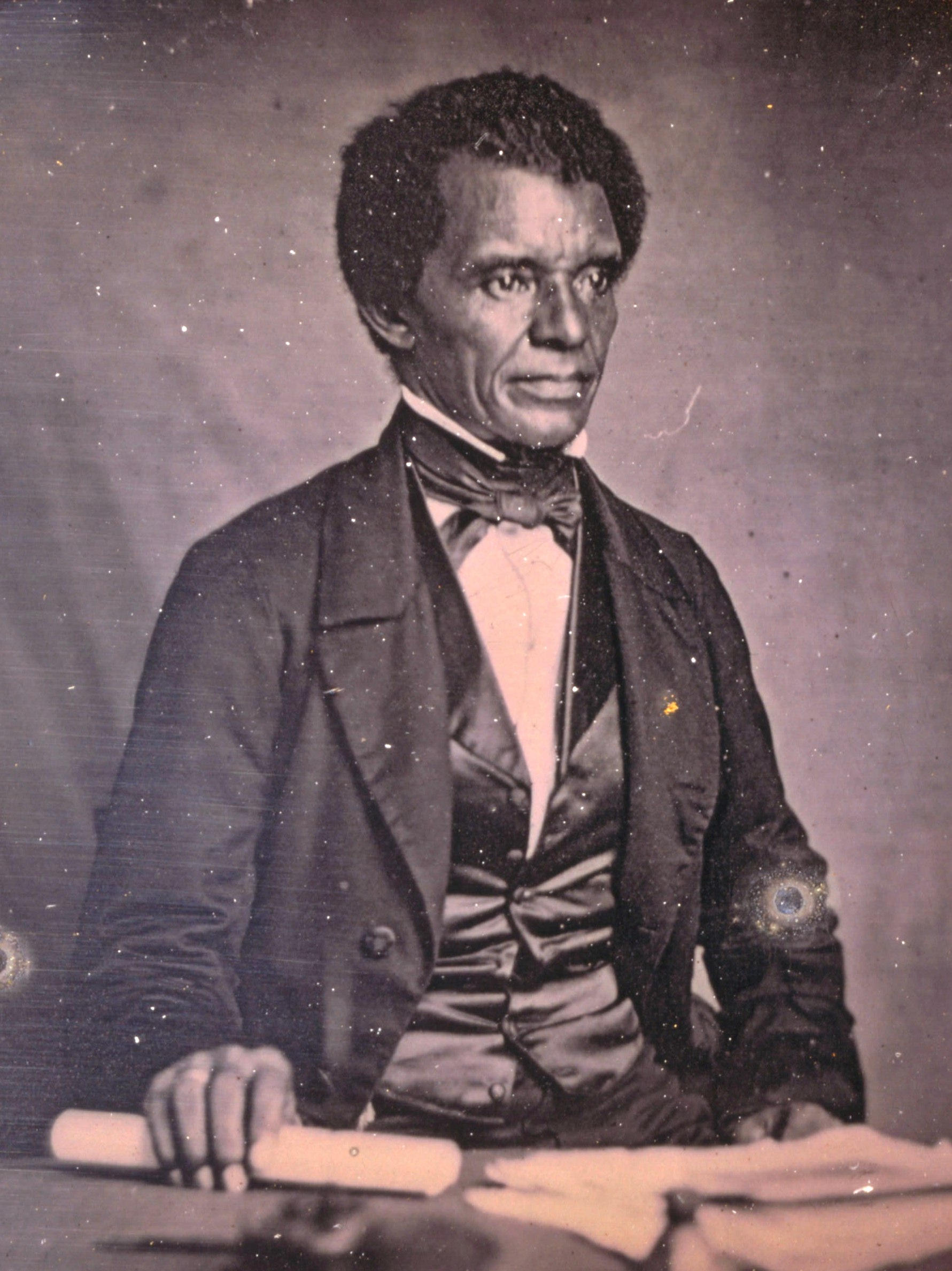
Beverly Page Yates in the 1850s

Beverly Page Yates (1811–1883) was an American-Liberian politician who served as the fourth vice president of Liberia from 1856 to 1860 under President Stephen Allen Benson. Born in the United States, he emigrated to Liberia as a young man under the auspices of the American Colonization Society. Yates also served as an associate justice of the Supreme Court of Liberia and Judge of the Court of Quarter Sessions and Common Pleas for Montserrado County, Liberia.

He established a powerful family in the settlement. His brother's daughter Sarah Yates married Edward Wilmot Blyden, considered a father of the pan-Africanist movement. In 1867 Yates helped found the Ancient, Free, and Accepted Masons in Liberia.

Political offices
Preceded by Stephen Allen Benson	Vice President of Liberia; 1856–1860	Succeeded by James M. Priest
