= 1869 Liberian general election =

- 4 May 1869
- Presidential election
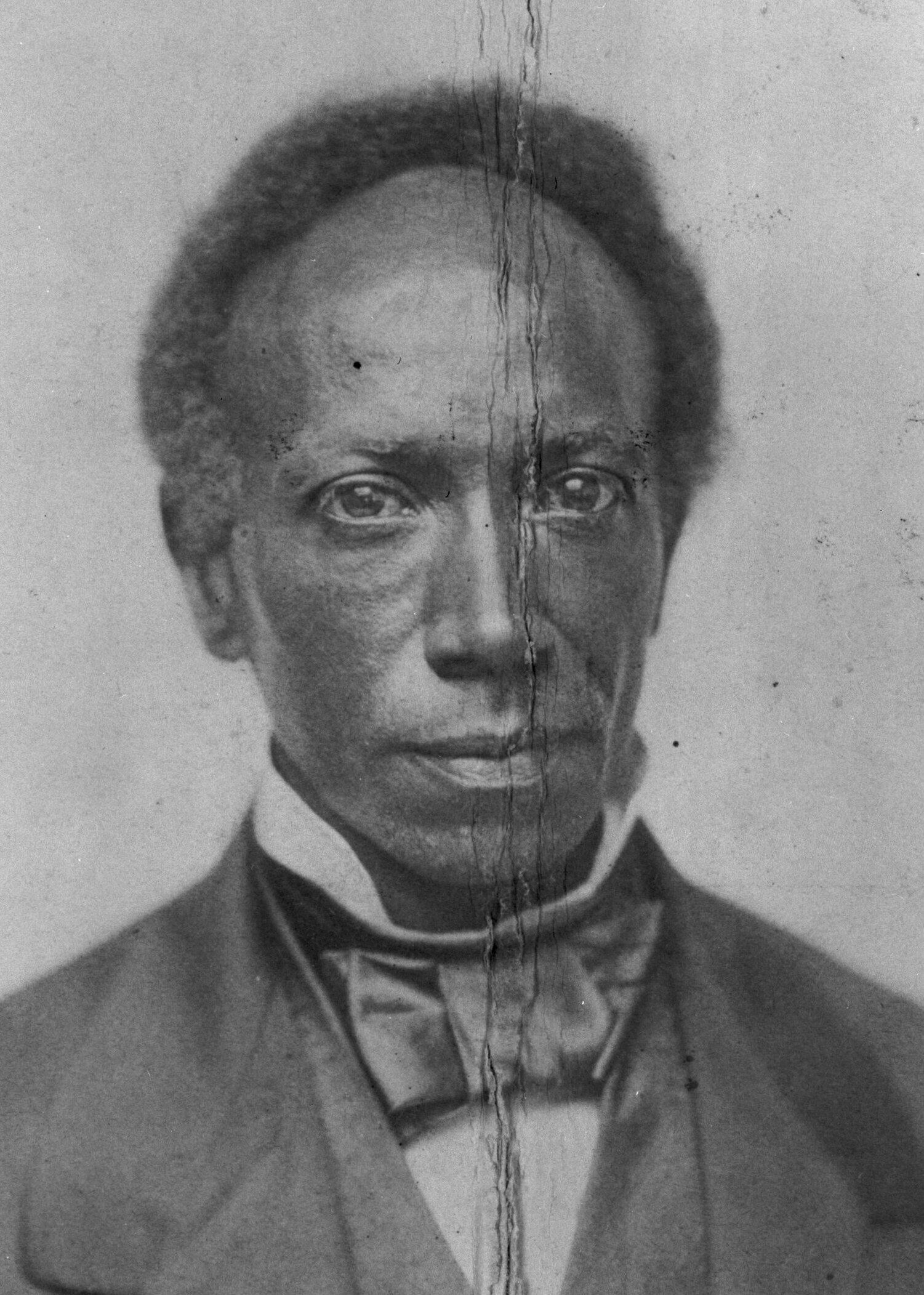

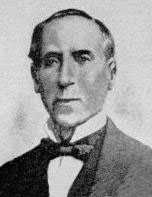
Nominee	Edward James Roye	James Spriggs Payne
Party	True Whig Party	Republican
President before election
James Spriggs Payne
Republican
Elected President
Edward James Roye
True Whig Party

General elections were held in Liberia in May 1869. The presidential election resulted in a victory for Edward James Roye of the True Whig Party, who defeated incumbent President James Spriggs Payne. The election was very close, with the House of Representatives required to decide the final outcome. This time Roye won the House vote and took office on 3 January 1870.
