= Daniel Bashiel Warner =

Former President of Liberia

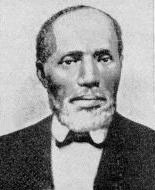

3rd President of Liberia
- In office January 4, 1864 – January 6, 1868
- Vice President: James M. Priest
- Preceded by: Stephen Allen Benson
- Succeeded by: James Spriggs Payne

5th Vice President of Liberia
- In office January 2, 1860 – January 4, 1864
- President: Stephen Allen Benson
- Preceded by: Beverly Page Yates
- Succeeded by: James M. Priest

3rd Secretary of State
- In office 1854–1856
- President: Joseph Jenkins Roberts
- Preceded by: John N. Lewis
- Succeeded by: James Skivring Smith

Personal details
- Born: April 19, 1815 Baltimore County, Maryland, United States
- Died: December 1, 1880 (aged 65) Liberia
- Party: Republican
- Spouse: Rachel Ann Warner

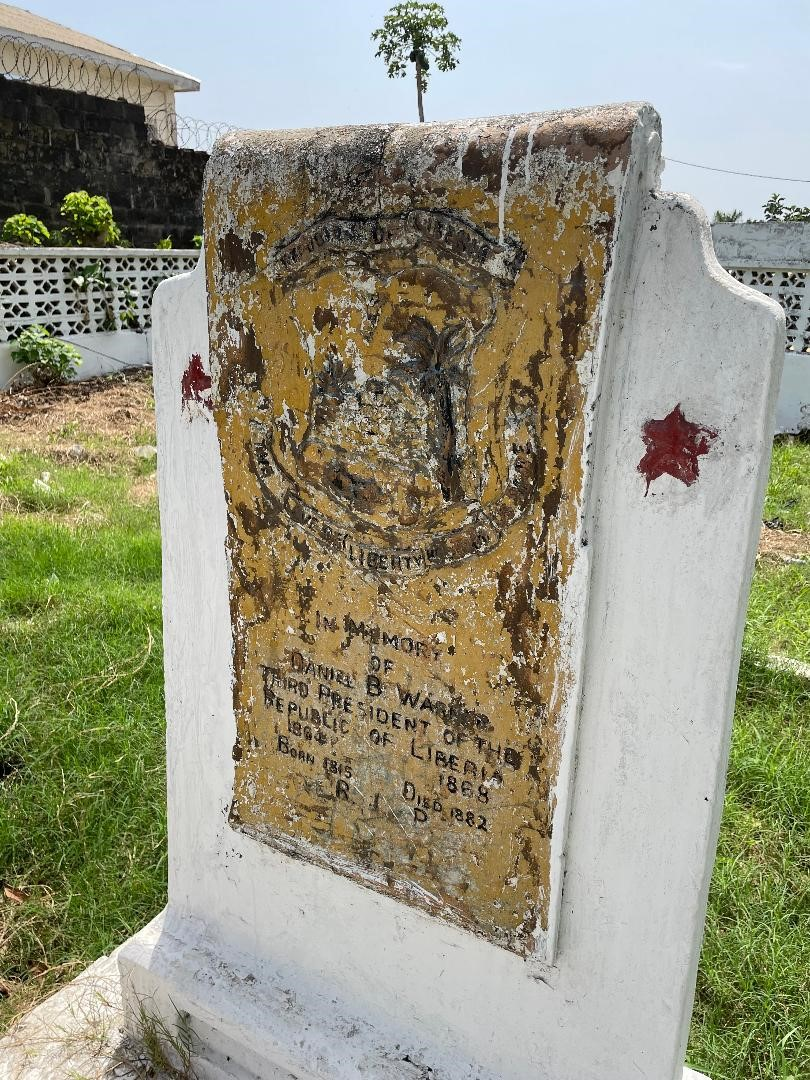
Gravesite at junction of Camp Johnson Road and Warren Street, Monrovia

Daniel Bashiel Warner (April 19, 1815 – December 1, 1880) served as the third president of Liberia from 1864 to 1868. Prior to this, he served as the third Secretary of State in the cabinet of Joseph Jenkins Roberts from 1854 to 1856 and the fifth vice president of Liberia under President Stephen Allen Benson from 1860 to 1864.

== Background ==
Warner, an African American, was born free on Hookstown Road in Baltimore County, Maryland, United States, to a father who was a farmer and ex-slave who acquired his freedom one year before Warner was born.

Warner's date of birth is unclear. Some records show that he was born on April 19, 1815. American Colonization Society documents list him as age nine when he emigrated from Baltimore to Liberia with eight relatives on the ship Oswego in 1823.

A member of the Americo-Liberian elite, before his presidency, he served as a member of the Liberian House of Representatives, including a term as Speaker of the House of Representatives from 1848 to 1849, and in the Liberian Senate. Following his presidency, in 1877, he became an agent of the American Colonization Society.

He also wrote the lyrics to the Liberian national anthem, which the country officially adopted upon its independence from the American Colonization Society in 1847.

He died in Monrovia on December 1, 1880. His grave is located in an enclosed plot wedged between Camp Johnson Road and Warren Street in Monrovia.

== Presidency (1864–1868) ==
Warner's main concern as president was his government's relationship with the area's indigenous people, particularly those in the interior of the country. He organized the first settler expedition into the interior in 1868. Led by Benjamin J. K. Anderson, the expedition resulted in the signing of a treaty between the Americo-Liberian government and the community of Moussadou in today's Guinea. Anderson took careful notes describing the people, the customs, and the natural resources of the areas he passed through, eventually publishing a report on his journey. Using the information from the report, Warner's government moved to assert limited control over the inland region. Warner retired after his second two-year term ended in 1868.

Political offices
Preceded by Stephen Allen Benson	President of Liberia; 1864–1868	Succeeded by James Spriggs Payne
Preceded by Beverly Page Yates	Vice President of Liberia; 1860–1864	Succeeded by James M. Priest
