= Stephen Allen Benson =

2nd President of Liberia from 1856 to 1864

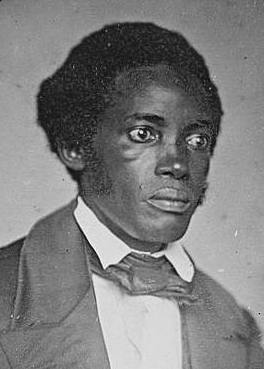
- Photograph c. 1851–1856

2nd President of Liberia
- In office January 7, 1856 – January 4, 1864
- Vice President: Beverly Page Yates; Daniel Bashiel Warner
- Preceded by: Joseph Jenkins Roberts
- Succeeded by: Daniel Bashiel Warner

3rd Vice President of Liberia
- In office January 2, 1854 – January 7, 1856
- President: Joseph Jenkins Roberts
- Preceded by: Anthony D. Williams
- Succeeded by: Beverly Page Yates

Personal details
- Born: May 21, 1816 Cambridge, Maryland, United States
- Died: January 24, 1865 (aged 48) Grand Bassa County, Liberia
- Party: Republican
- Spouse: Nancy Moore (m. 1841)

Stephen Allen Benson (May 21, 1816 – January 24, 1865) was a Liberian politician who served as the second president of Liberia from 1856 to 1864. He previously served as the third vice president of Liberia from 1854 to 1856 under President Joseph Jenkins Roberts. Born in the United States, Benson arrived in Liberia with his family in 1822.

== Early life ==
Benson was born in Cambridge, Maryland, United States, to freeborn African-American parents. In 1822, his family emigrated to the newly established country of Liberia, sailing aboard the brig Strong.

For four years, he was a military shopkeeper. He was also a private secretary to Thomas Buchanan, the last of Liberia's white governors. Benson later became a successful businessman, and joined the militia in 1835. In 1841, Benson married Nancy Moore. In 1842, he became a delegate to the Colonial Council. After Liberia's independence in 1847, he became a judge. He was also a Methodist preacher, and the Secretary of the Treasury before becoming president.

== Presidency (1856–64) ==
In 1853, Benson became the vice president under Joseph Jenkins Roberts, serving in that capacity until winning the presidency in the 1855 elections, taking office the following year.

=== Foreign relations ===
Benson obtained diplomatic recognition for Liberia from Belgium in 1858, Denmark in 1860, the United States and Italy in 1862, Norway and Sweden in 1863, and Haiti in 1864.

=== Expansion ===
In 1857, Benson organized the annexation of the Republic of Maryland. By 1860, through treaties and purchases with local African leaders, Liberia had extended its boundaries to include a 600-mile (1000 km) coastline.

== Retirement ==
After the end of his presidency, Benson retired to his coffee plantation in Grand Bassa County where he died in 1865.

== Legacy ==
Benson is commemorated in the scientific name of a species of lizard, Trachylepis bensonii, which is endemic to Liberia.

Political offices
Preceded by Anthony D. Williams	Vice President of Liberia; 1853–1856	Succeeded by Beverley Yates
Preceded by Joseph Jenkins Roberts	President of Liberia; 1856–1864	Succeeded by Daniel Bashiel Warner
