= Anthony W. Gardner =

President of Liberia (1820–1885)

Anthony William Gardner
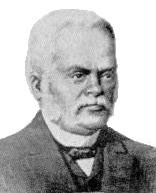

9th President of Liberia
- In office January 7, 1878 – January 20, 1883
- Vice President: Alfred Francis Russell
- Preceded by: James Spriggs Payne
- Succeeded by: Alfred F. Russell

9th Vice President of Liberia
- In office January 1, 1872 – January 3, 1876
- President: Joseph Jenkins Roberts
- Preceded by: James Skivring Smith
- Succeeded by: Charles Harmon

1st Attorney General of Liberia
- In office 1848–1855
- President: Joseph Jenkins Roberts

Personal details
- Born: January 24, 1820 Southampton County, Virginia, United States
- Died: 1885 (aged 64-65)
- Party: True Whig

Anthony William Gardner (January 24, 1820 – 1885), sometimes written as Gardiner, served as the ninth president of Liberia from 1878 until 1883. He was the first of a series of thirteen True Whig presidents who held uninterrupted power in Liberia from 1878 until 1980.

== Early years ==
Gardner was born in Southampton County, Virginia, United States, on January 24, 1820. In 1831, in the wake of Nat Turner's Rebellion in Southampton, when Gardner was still a child, his was one of the families who relocated to Liberia under the sponsorship of the American Colonization Society. Gardner received his law degree in Liberia and, in 1847, he served as a delegate to the National Convention, which drafted Liberia's declaration of independence and constitution. He became Liberia's first attorney general and later served in the House of Representatives of Liberia from 1855 to 1871. He served as Speaker of the House of Representatives 1860–1861.

In May 1871, he was elected vice-president and was elected once again, serving until 1876. During the incapacitation of President Joseph Jenkins Roberts from 1875 until early 1876, Gardner was also acting president.

Less than two years after leaving office as acting president, Gardner won election to the presidency, taking office in 1878. In the same election, the True Whig Party won a massive victory and proceeded to dominate Liberian politics until a coup d'état in 1980 ended almost a century and a half of minority rule by the Americo-Liberians.

== Presidency (1878–1883) ==
In the decades after 1868, escalating economic difficulties weakened the state's dominance over the coastal indigenous population. Conditions worsened, and the cost of imports was far greater than the income generated by exports of coffee, rice, palm oil, sugarcane, and timber. Liberia tried desperately to modernize its largely agricultural economy. The government also moved to settle foreign financial obligations, including claims associated with British interests, reflecting increasing external pressure on Liberia’s sovereignty during this period. As president, Gardner called for increased trade with and investment from outside countries, improved public education, and closer relations with Liberia's native peoples. However, his policies were overshadowed by the ramifications of the European powers "scramble for Africa".

=== Territorial conflicts with European powers ===
Rivalries between the Europeans colonizing West Africa and the interest of the United States helped preserve Liberian independence during this period, and until 1919, despite Liberia's ongoing disputes with England and France.

During Gardner's administration difficulties with the British Empire and Imperial Germany reached a crisis. Liberia was drawn into a border conflict with the British Empire over the Gallinas territory, lying between the Sewa River and the Mano River—territory which now forms the extreme eastern part of Sierra Leone. The British made a formal show of force at Monrovia in a mission led by Sir Arthur Havelock; meanwhile, the looting of a German vessel along the Kru Coast and personal indignities inflicted by the natives upon the shipwrecked Germans, led to the bombardment of Nana Kru by the German corvette SMS Victoria and the presentation at Monrovia of a claim for damages, payment of which was forced by the threat of the bombardment of the capital.

=== Resignation ===
President Gardner resigned on January 20, 1883, due to a serious illness. He was succeeded by the vice president, Alfred F. Russell. Two months later, in March 1883, the British Government annexed the Gallinas territory west of the Mano River and formally incorporated it into Sierra Leone.

== See also ==
- History of Liberia

== Bibliography ==
- Brawley, Benjamin (1971) [1921]. A Social History of The American Negro, Being a History of the Negro Problem in the United States. Including A History And Study Of The Republic Of Liberia. New York, AMS Press. ISBN 0-404-00138-6.

== Notes ==
This article incorporates public domain text from Brawley, A Social History of The American Negro, retrieved from Project Gutenberg

Political offices
Preceded by James Skivring Smith	Vice President of Liberia; 1871–1876	Succeeded by Charles Harmon
Preceded by James Spriggs Payne	President of Liberia; 1878–1883	Succeeded by Alfred Francis Russell
