= James Spriggs Payne =

President of Liberia (1868–70, 1876–78)

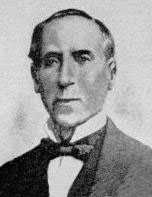

4th and 8th President of Liberia
- In office January 6, 1868 – January 3, 1870
- Vice President: Joseph Gibson
- Preceded by: Daniel Bashiel Warner
- Succeeded by: Edward James Roye
- In office January 3, 1876 – January 7, 1878
- Vice President: Charles Harmon
- Preceded by: Joseph Jenkins Roberts
- Succeeded by: Anthony W. Gardner

Personal details
- Born: December 19, 1819 Richmond, Virginia, United States
- Died: January 31, 1882 (aged 62) Monrovia, Liberia
- Party: Republican

James Spriggs Payne (December 19, 1819 – January 31, 1882) served as the fourth and eighth president of Liberia, from 1868 to 1870 and from 1876 to 1878. He was the last president to belong to the Republican Party.

== Early life ==
Payne was born in Richmond, Virginia, in 1819 to free mixed-race parents. Payne grew up in a deeply religious Methodist family and was a devout Christian. His father, David M. Payne, was a Methodist minister and was ordained a deacon by the Virginia Conference in 1824. Payne was noted for having a rather light complexion, with some estimates claiming that he was indeed an octoroon—having seven-eights European ancestry and one-eighth African ancestry. When Payne was ten years old, his family emigrated to Liberia on the brig Harriet, the same ship as Joseph Jenkins Roberts, Liberia's future first president, under the auspices of the American Colonization Society.

Aside from religion, the young Payne showed interest in politics and economics. He later became a successful writer in these areas. As an adult, he was appointed by the Liberian government to work to complete the severance of Liberia's ties to the American Colonization Society.

== Presidency ==
=== First term ===
Payne was elected as the fourth president of Liberia in 1868 and served a single two-year term. During his presidency, he worked to end the slave trade that still took place along Liberia's coast. During his first term, he improved government relations with the indigenous communities in Liberia, whom he believed early settlers and leaders had for the most part ignored. He likewise worked to extend Liberia's trading and political ties with Europe. gaining recognition from Denmark and Sweden but struggling to maintain Liberia's economy as both Europe and the United States began to industrialize.

=== Second term ===
Payne was elected a second time in 1876, again serving a single two-year term. Escalating economic difficulties began to weaken the Liberia's dominance over the coastal indigenous population. When the financially burdened ACS withdrew its support from the young republic in the years after the American Civil War, conditions had worsened as Liberia struggled to modernize its largely agricultural economy. The cost of imported goods was far greater than the income generated by the nation's exports of coffee, rice, palm oil, sugarcane, and timber. As a result, Payne made efforts to increase the country's foreign trade. However, despite his efforts, Liberia's economy dwindled. Indeed, the Liberian dollar lost more than 70% of its value due to decreasing exports and excessive imports from the industrial nations of the Atlantic. Payne retired after this difficult term, but he could claim a few important successes. By the end of the term in 1878, for example, most European and North American countries recognized Liberia's independence.

== Later life and family ==
Payne married three times in his life. He was widowed twice. He had nine children in total. On leaving political office in 1878, Payne continued his lifelong involvement in church work. In 1880, he was the Liberian delegate at the General Conference of the Methodist Episcopal Church in Cincinnati, Ohio. The next year, he was elected president of the Methodist Annual Conference of Liberia. James Spriggs Payne died in Monrovia in 1882.

== Legacy and honors ==
- In January 1882, he was awarded an honorary doctor of divinity degree by Liberia College (now University of Liberia) for his life achievements.
- Spriggs Payne Airport in the Monrovia area is named after him.
- Besides Payne's descendants in Liberia, the Krio branch of the Blyden family are descended from Payne through his granddaughter Anna Erskine, who was the partner of Edward Wilmot Blyden.

== Sources ==
- Melton, J. Gordon, A Will to Choose: The origins of African American Methodism, Rowman & Littlefield, 2007, ISBN 0-7425-5265-9

Political offices
Preceded by Daniel Bashiel Warner	President of Liberia; 1868–1870	Succeeded by Edward James Roye
Preceded by Joseph Jenkins Roberts	President of Liberia; 1876–1878	Succeeded by Anthony W. Gardner
