= Joseph Jenkins Roberts =

1st and 7th president of Liberia (1848–56, 1872–76)

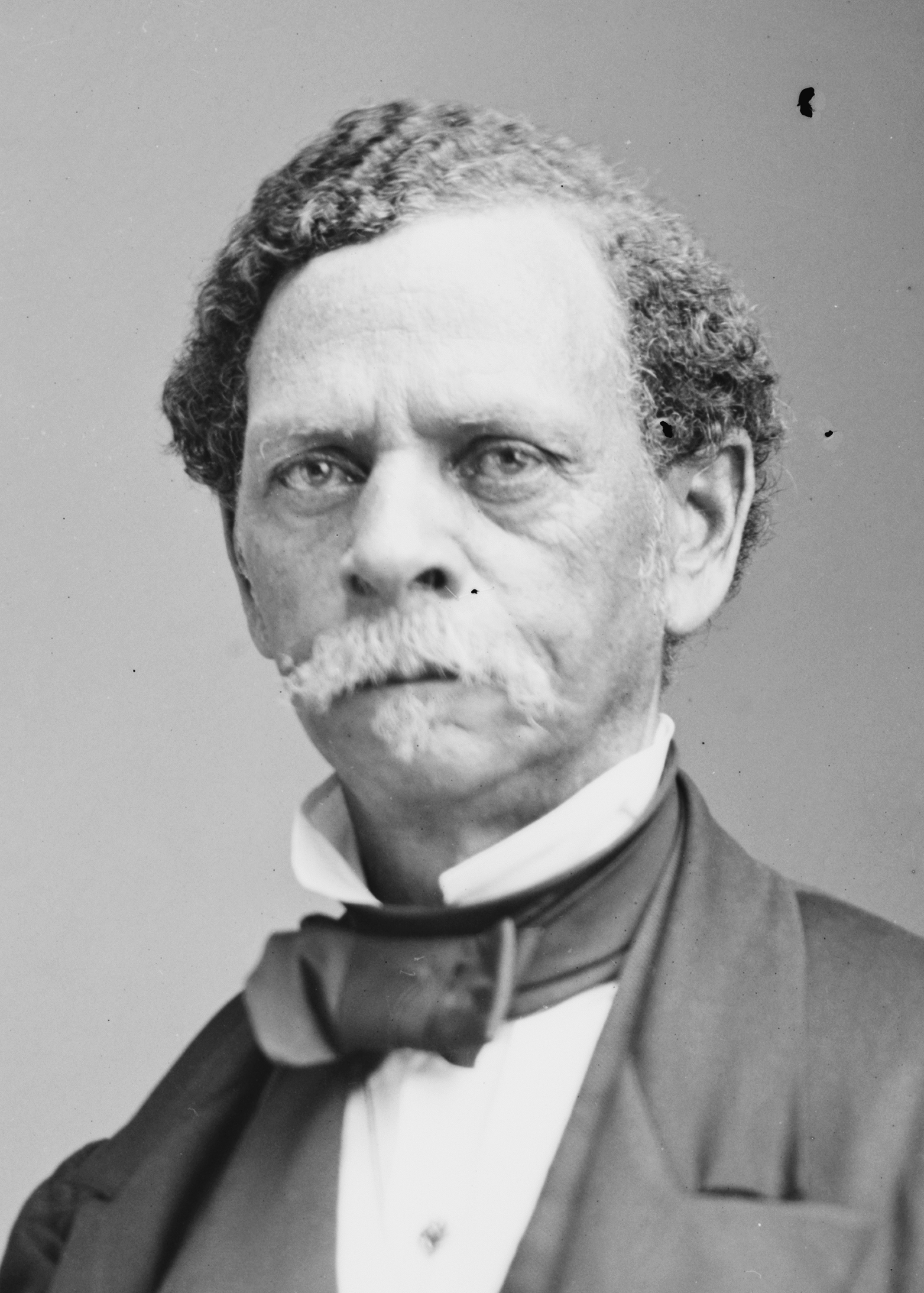
- Roberts c. 1865

1st and 7th President of Liberia
- In office January 3, 1848 – January 7, 1856
- Vice President: Nathaniel Brander; Anthony D. Williams; Stephen Allen Benson
- Preceded by: Position established
- Succeeded by: Stephen Allen Benson
- In office January 1, 1872 – January 3, 1876
- Vice President: Anthony W. Gardner
- Preceded by: James Skivring Smith
- Succeeded by: James Spriggs Payne

2nd Governor of Liberia
- In office September 3, 1841 – January 3, 1848
- Preceded by: Thomas Buchanan
- Succeeded by: Position abolished

Personal details
- Born: March 15, 1809 Norfolk, Virginia, United States
- Died: February 24, 1876 (aged 66) Monrovia, Liberia
- Resting place: Palm Grove Cemetery; Monrovia
- Party: Republican Party
- Spouses: Sarah Minor Roberts (m. 1828; died 1836); Jane Rose Waring (m. 1836)

Joseph Jenkins Roberts (March 15, 1809 – February 24, 1876) was an African American merchant who emigrated to Liberia in 1829, where he became a politician. Elected as the first (1848–1856) and seventh (1872–1876) president of Liberia after independence, he was the first man of African descent to govern the country, serving previously as governor from 1841 to 1848. He later returned to office in the 1871 general election following the 1871 Liberian coup d'état. Born free in Norfolk, Virginia, Roberts emigrated as a young man with his mother, siblings, wife, and child to the young West African colony. He opened a trading firm in Monrovia and later engaged in politics.

== Early life ==
Joseph Jenkins Roberts was born free in Norfolk, Virginia, the second-oldest of seven children. His father was said to be a planter of Welsh origin. Joseph's mother Amelia, described as a "mulatto" who was quite fair, was the planter's slave mistress or concubine, and he freed her when she was still young, before Joseph was born. Amelia gave all but one of her children the middle name of Jenkins, which suggests that was likely the surname of their biological father.

After receiving her freedom, Amelia moved and married James Roberts, a free man of color. Roberts gave her children his surname and raised them as his own. Roberts owned a boating business on the James River. By the time of his death, he had acquired substantial wealth for a free man of color at the time.

Joseph Roberts and his siblings were estimated to be of seven-eighths European ancestry. The Liberian historian Abayomi Karnga explained in 1926: "He was not really black; he was an octoroon and could have easily passed for a white man." However, his native Virginia classed him as a person of color because he was born to a mother of African descent.

The family moved to Petersburg, an industrial city on the upper James River with a substantial population of free people of color. As a boy, Joseph began to work in his stepfather's business, handling goods on a flatboat that transported materials from Petersburg to Norfolk, Virginia, on the James River. Shortly after the family relocated, his stepfather James Roberts died. Joseph continued to work in his family's business, but also served as an apprentice in a barber shop. The owner of the barber shop, William Colson, was also a minister and one of Virginia's best-educated black residents. He gave Roberts access to his private library, which provided much of the youth's early education.

== Marriage and family ==
In 1828, Roberts married 18-year-old Sarah Minor, the freeborn daughter of Jane Minor. They had an infant child whom they took with them when they emigrated the next year to the new colony of Liberia under the auspices of the American Colonization Society. The child died in the first year of living in the colony, and Sarah followed in 1836. There was a very high rate of mortality due to disease among settlers to the new colony.

Some time after his wife's death, Roberts married again, to Jane Rose Waring, in 1836 in Monrovia, Liberia. She was a daughter of Colston Waring and Harriet Graves, other Virginians who had emigrated to the colony.

== Emigrating to Liberia ==
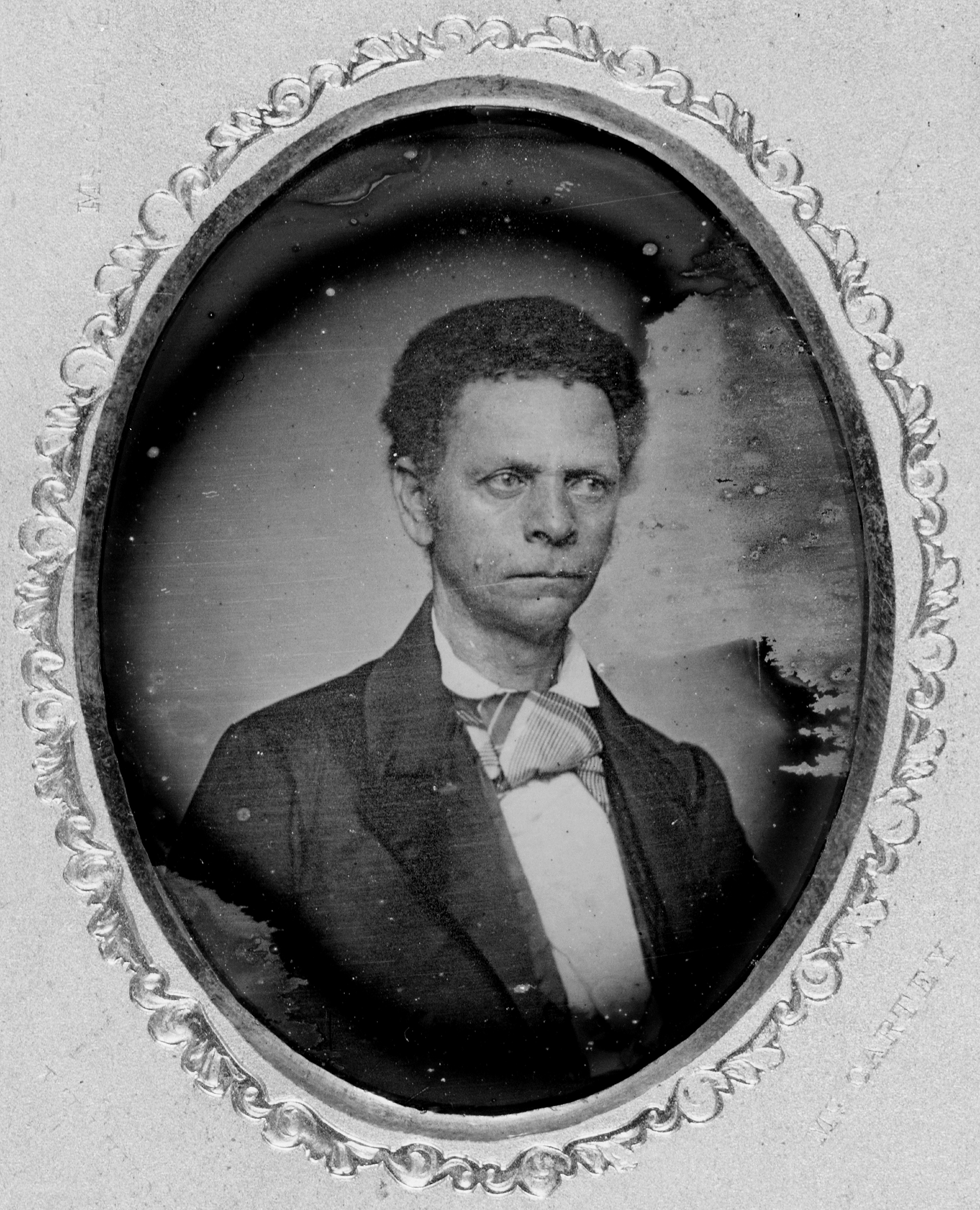
Daguerreotype likely taken between 1840 and 1860

After hearing about the American Colonization Society's efforts in creating the colony of Liberia on the West African coast, Roberts decided to join a group of fellow Virginians preparing to leave for Monrovia, the capital of the young colony. Although Roberts was educated and a relatively successful merchant by the time he and his family emigrated, the restrictions in Virginia on free people of color played an important role in his decision.

The Roberts family was deeply religious, and they felt called to evangelize the indigenous peoples of Africa. On February 9, 1829, they sailed for Africa on the ship Harriet, along with Roberts's mother and five of his six siblings. Another passenger on the same ship was James Spriggs Payne, who later became a leader and was elected as Liberia's fourth president.

Several years before leaving for Liberia, Roberts established a business with his friend William Nelson Colson from Petersburg. Known as Roberts, Colson, & Company, the partnership continued and even expanded after Roberts emigrated, exporting palm products, camwood, and ivory to the United States and trading American goods at a company store in Monrovia. Roberts made several trips to the United States, including stops in New York, Philadelphia, and Richmond as a representative of the firm. In 1835, Colson emigrated to Liberia, but died shortly after his arrival. Expanding into coastal trade, the Roberts family became successful members of the local establishment.

During this time, Joseph's brother, John Wright Roberts, entered the ministry of the Liberian Methodist Church. Later he became a bishop. After starting as a trader, the youngest brother, Henry Roberts, studied medicine at the Berkshire Medical College in Massachusetts. Joseph Roberts was successful enough to pay for his brother's tuition. Henry returned to Liberia to work as a physician.

In 1833, Joseph Roberts became high sheriff of the colony. One of his responsibilities was to organize militias to travel to the interior to collect taxes from the indigenous peoples and put down their raids against areas under colonial rule. In 1839, the American Colonization Society appointed Roberts as vice governor.

Two years later, after the death of governor Thomas Buchanan, Roberts was appointed as the first African-American governor of Liberia. Roberts's skills as a diplomat and a politician soon became apparent. He became convinced that Liberia had the potential. Then the legislature called for a referendum, in which voters chose independence. On July 26, 1847, a group of eleven delegates declared Liberia independent. He won the first presidential election on October 5, 1847, and was sworn into office on January 3, 1848, with Nathaniel Brander as vice president.

== First presidency (1848–1856) ==
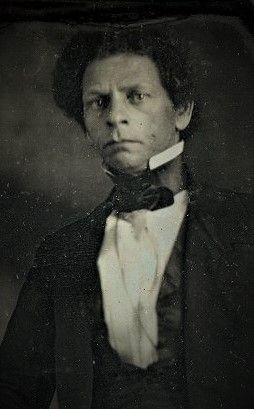
Roberts in 1846

President Roberts's residence on Ashmun Street

Roberts was re-elected three more times to serve a total of eight years, until he lost the election in 1855 to Vice President Benson.

Attempts to found a state based upon some 3,000 settlers proved difficult. Some coastal ethnic groups were converted to Christianity and learned English, but most of the indigenous Africans of the area retained their traditional religions and languages. They also continued to take part in the Atlantic Slave Trade operated by European slavers along the coast. The slave trade continued illegally from ports along the Liberian coast, but the British Royal Navy along with that of the United States finally helped to close it down in the 1850s.

=== Foreign relations ===
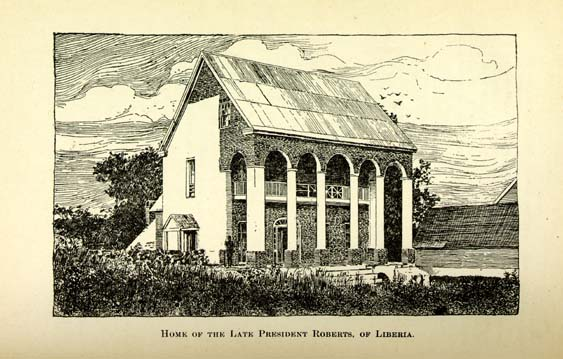
Lithograph of the former home of Joseph Roberts in Monrovia

Roberts spent the first year of his presidency attempting to attain recognition from the United States, where it was opposed mainly by southern congressmen, as well as several European nations with neighboring colonies. In 1848 he traveled to Europe to meet Queen Victoria and other heads of state. The UK was the first country to recognize Liberia as an independent country, followed by France in 1848 or 1852 (accounts differ). In 1849, the German cities of Hamburg, Bremen and Lübeck recognized the new nation, as did the Kingdom of Portugal, the Empire of Brazil, the Kingdom of Sardinia, and the Austrian Empire. Norway and Sweden did so in either 1849 or 1863, Haiti in either 1849 or 1864, Denmark in either 1849 or 1869 (accounts differ).

The United States withheld recognition until February 5, 1862, during the presidency of Abraham Lincoln. Reportedly, the government had reservations over the political and social statuses of black diplomats in Washington, D.C. Soon after the recognition of Liberia's independence, slavery was abolished in Washington, D.C.

=== Relations with Indigenous Groups ===
In 1854 Maryland Colony, which was established adjacent to Liberia, declared its independence from the Maryland State Colonization Society but did not become part of the Republic of Liberia. It held the land along the coast between the Grand Cess and San Pedro rivers. In 1856, it requested military aid from Liberia in a war with the Grebo and Kru peoples. The latter were resisting the Maryland colonists' efforts to control their trade in slaves and other goods. Roberts assisted the Maryland colony, and a joint military campaign by the two groups of African-American colonists resulted in victory. In 1857, the year after Roberts left office for the first time, the Republic of Maryland joined Liberia as Maryland County.

During his presidency, Roberts expanded the borders of Liberia along the coast and made attempts to assimilate the indigenous people surrounding Monrovia into Americo-Liberian culture, largely through directed education and religious conversion.

=== Economy, nation building ===
The settlers built schools and Liberia College (which later became the University of Liberia). During these early years, agriculture, shipbuilding, and trade flourished.

=== Assessment ===
Roberts has been described as a talented leader with diplomatic skills. His leadership was instrumental in gaining independence and sovereignty for Liberia. Later in his career, his diplomatic skills helped him to deal effectively with the indigenous peoples and to maneuver in the complex field of international law and relations.

== Between presidencies ==
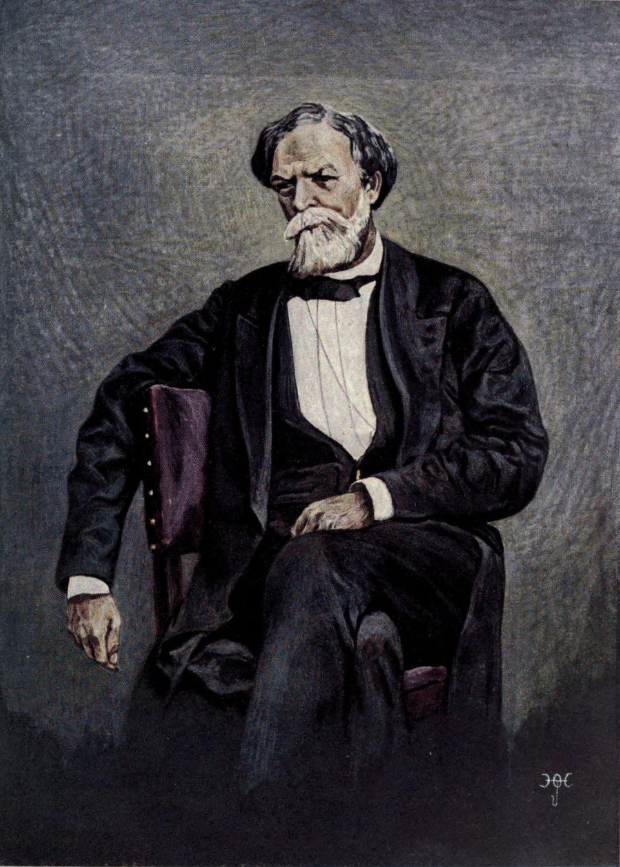
Painted portrait from c. 1871

After his first presidency, Roberts served for fifteen years as a major general in the Liberian Army, as well as a diplomatic representative of the nation to France and Great Britain. In 1862, he co-founded Liberia College in Monrovia, where he served as its first president until 1876. Roberts frequently traveled to the United States to raise funds for the college. Until his death, he held a professorship in jurisprudence and international law.

== Second presidency (1872–1876) ==
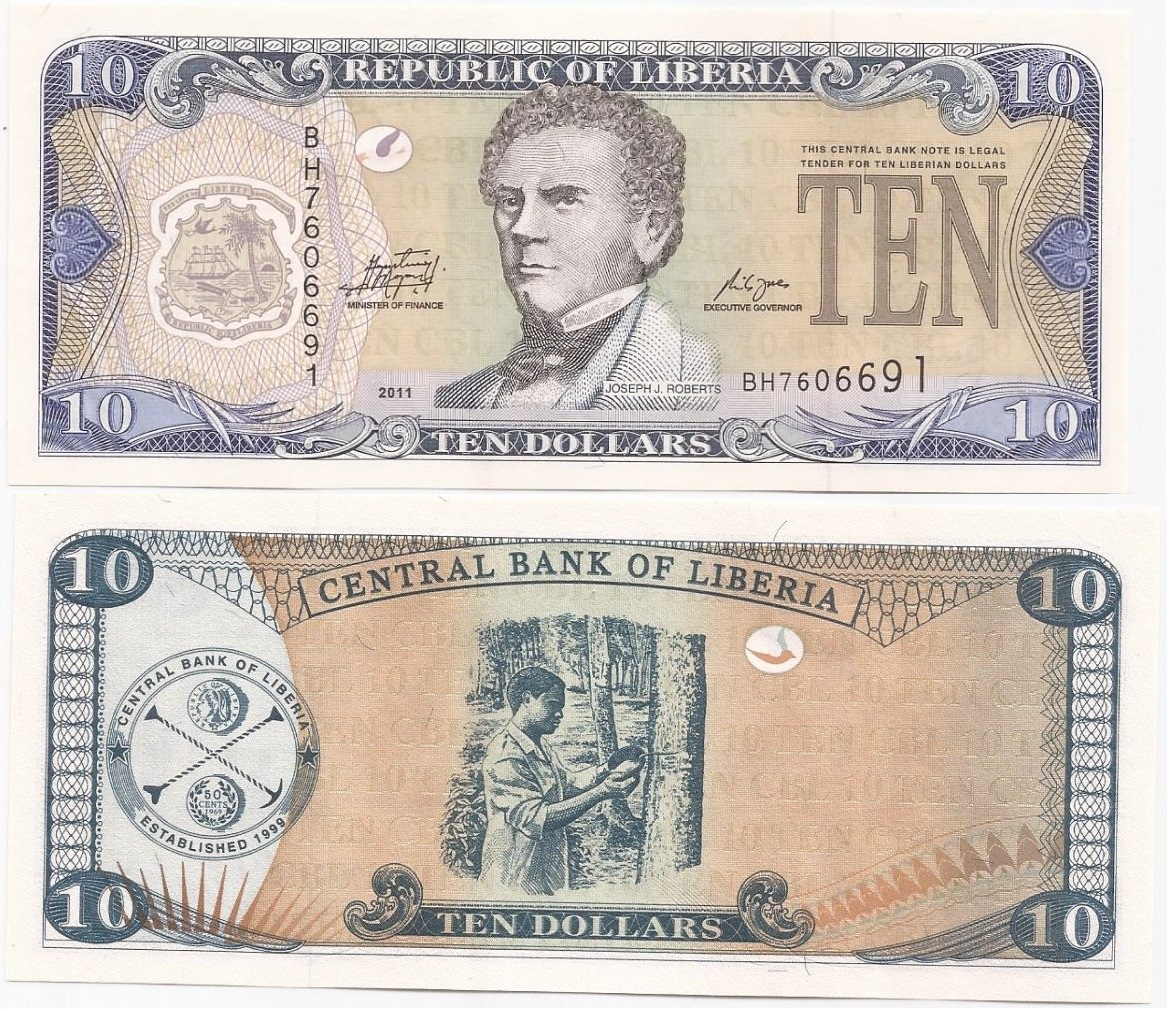
Roberts's image on the Liberian ten dollar bill

In 1871, President Edward James Roye was deposed by elements loyal to the Republican Party on the grounds that he was planning to cancel the upcoming elections. Roberts, one of the Republican Party's leaders, won the ensuing presidential election and returned to office in 1872. He served for two terms until 1876. While Roberts was incapacitated by illness from 1875 until early 1876, Vice President Anthony W. Gardner served as acting president.

In the 1860s and 1870s, escalating economic difficulties weakened Monrovia's dominance over the coastal indigenous populations, leading to several violent conflicts. Conditions worsened following Roberts's second presidency, as the cost of imports was far greater than the income generated by exports of coffee, rice, palm oil, sugar cane, camwood, and timber.

== Inheritance and legacy ==
Roberts died on February 24, 1876, less than two months after his final term as president ended. He was buried in Palm Grove Cemetery in Monrovia. His grave and that of some of his relatives, including brother Henry, are located in a walled enclosure on the northeast side of the cemetery. In his will, he left $10,000 and his estate to the educational system of Liberia. Today, Liberia's main airport, Roberts International Airport, as well as the town of Robertsport and Roberts Street in Monrovia are named in his honor.

His face is depicted on the Liberian ten dollar bill, introduced in 2000, and the old five dollar bill in circulation between 1989 and 1999.

His birthday, March 15, is a national holiday in Liberia.

== See also ==
- History of Liberia

Government offices
Preceded by Thomas Buchanan	Governor of Liberia; 1841–1848	Office abolished
Political offices
Office established	President of Liberia; 1848–1856	Succeeded by Stephen Allen Benson
Preceded by James Skivring Smith	President of Liberia; 1872–1876	Succeeded by James Spriggs Payne
