= Republican Party (Liberia) =

Former Liberian political party

- Leaders: Joseph Jenkins Roberts, Daniel Bashiel Warner, James Spriggs Payne
- Founded: 1848
- Dissolved: 1899
- Headquarters: Monrovia
- Ideology: Decentralization; Classical liberalism Progressivism
- Political position: Center-left
- International affiliation: American Colonization Society
- Colors: Red

The Republican Party, originally named the True Liberian Party until 1857, was a political party founded soon after the founding of Liberia in 1848. It was known to be made up primarily of Americo-Liberians who had mixed African and European ancestry. Its main opponent was the True Whig Party.

The first President of Liberia, Joseph Jenkins Roberts, supported the party, which had the first candidates elected to office in the independent nation. The party weakened soon after the death of Roberts. After the end of James Spriggs Payne's term in 1878, the election of Anthony W. Gardner to the presidency marked the beginning of more than a century of True Whig Party dominance in Liberian politics. In 1899, the Republican Party disappeared.

== Electoral history ==
=== Presidential elections ===
Election	Party candidate	Result
1863	Daniel Bashiel Warner	Elected ✓
1865	Daniel Bashiel Warner	Elected ✓
1867	James Spriggs Payne	Elected ✓
1869	James Spriggs Payne	Lost ✗
1871	Joseph Jenkins Roberts	Elected ✓
1873	Joseph Jenkins Roberts	Elected ✓
1875	James Spriggs Payne	Elected ✓
1883	Supported Hilary Richard Wright Johnson (TWP)	Elected ✓
1885	Edward Wilmot Blyden	Lost ✗
