= President of Liberia =

Head of state and government

President of the Republic of Liberia
- Presidential standard

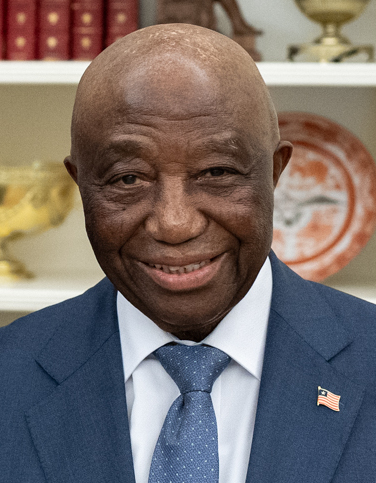
- Incumbent; Joseph Boakai since January 22, 2024
- Style: Mr. President (Informal); His Excellency (Formal)
- Type: Head of state; Head of government
- Residence: Executive Mansion
- Seat: Monrovia
- Term length: Six years, renewable once
- Constituting instrument: Constitution of Liberia (1986)
- Formation: July 26, 1847; 179 years ago
- First holder: Joseph Jenkins Roberts
- Deputy: Vice President of Liberia
- Salary: US$90,000 annually
- Website: Official website

The president of the Republic of Liberia is the head of state and government of Liberia. The president serves as the leader of the executive branch and as commander-in-chief of the Armed Forces of Liberia.

Prior to the independence of Liberia in 1847, executive power in the Commonwealth of Liberia was held by the governor of Liberia, who was appointed by the American Colonization Society. The 1847 Constitution transferred the executive powers of the governorship to the presidency, which was largely modeled on the presidency of the United States.

Between 1847 and 1980, the presidency was exclusively held by Americo-Liberians, the original American settlers of Liberia and their descendants. The original two-party system, with the Republican Party and the True Whig Party, ended in 1878, when the election of Anthony W. Gardner marked the beginning of 102 years of one-party rule by the True Whigs. Following a coup d'état by disgruntled army NCOs and soldiers led by Samuel Doe in 1980, one-party rule of the True Whigs ended and the presidency was vacated until the election of Doe in the 1985 general election. After his overthrow and murder in 1990, the presidency was again vacated for seven years during the First Liberian Civil War and again for two years following the conclusion of the Second Liberian Civil War in 2003.

Under the 1986 Constitution, the president is directly elected by eligible voters to a six-year term, which may be renewed once. Overall, 25 individuals have served as president, including Ellen Johnson Sirleaf, the first elected female head of state in Africa. On January 22, 2024, Joseph Boakai was sworn in as the twenty-sixth and current president of Liberia.

== History ==
Following the establishment of the Commonwealth of Liberia in 1838, executive power was vested in the governor of Liberia, who was appointed and served at the pleasure of the American Colonization Society. The first governor, Thomas Buchanan, served from 1838 until his death in 1841. He was succeeded by Joseph Jenkins Roberts, the first person of African descent to serve as governor of Liberia.

Upon independence in 1847, Roberts was elected as the first president of Liberia. The 1847 Constitution denied suffrage to the indigenous population by requiring voters to own real estate. As a result, the presidency was exclusively held by Americo-Liberians until 1980, when a military coup led by Samuel Doe, an ethnic Krahn, overthrew and murdered President William Tolbert.

The presidency was vacant from 1980 to 1986, with executive power held by Doe as the head of the People's Redemption Council. Doe was later elected president in the 1985 general election, making him the first president outside of the Americo-Liberian elite. Doe was later overthrown and murdered in 1990 following the commencement First Liberian Civil War, during which the presidency remained vacant.

Following the 1997 general election, Charles Taylor held the presidency until his resignation on August 11, 2003, as part of a peace deal to end the Second Liberian Civil War. His successor, Moses Blah, ceded executive power on October 13 of that year to Gyude Bryant, the chairman of the Transitional Government of Liberia. The presidency was resumed on January 16, 2006, following the 2005 general election of Ellen Johnson Sirleaf as the first female president.

Former professional footballer George Weah was elected in 2017 as the 25th president of Liberia. Incumbent president Ellen Johnson Sirleaf signed Executive Order No. 91, thus establishing a Joint Presidential Transition Team, due to the fact that Liberia had "not experienced the transfer of power from one democratically elected president to another democratically elected president for over 70 years".

== Powers and duties ==
The presidency of Liberia is largely modeled on the presidency of the United States.

=== Executive functions ===
The 1986 Constitution gives the president the power to appoint all cabinet ministers, judges, ambassadors, sheriffs, county officials and military officers with the advice and consent of the Senate. Additionally, the president has the power to dismiss all appointees from office at his or her discretion. The president may also grant pardons or revoke sentences and fines. The president conducts all matters of foreign policy, though any treaties or international agreements must be ratified by both houses of the Legislature. Furthermore, the president serves as the commander-in-chief of the Armed Forces of Liberia.

The Constitution also grants the president the power to declare a state of emergency during times of war or civil unrest and suspend civil liberties during the emergency as necessary, with the exception of habeas corpus. Within seven days of the declaration, the president must state to the Legislature the reasons for the declaration, which both houses must then approve by a two-thirds majority. Otherwise, the president must repeal the state of emergency.

=== Legislative functions ===
The president must sign all legislation passed by the House of Representatives and Senate. The president may choose to veto any legislation, which may be overturned by a two-thirds majority in both houses. Additionally, the president may exercise a pocket veto by refusing to sign legislation when the end of the twenty-day deadline for signing the bill falls during a recess of the legislature. The president may extend a legislative session past its adjournment date or call a special extraordinary session when deemed necessary for the national interest. The president must also give an annual report to the legislature on the state of the country.

== Eligibility ==
To be eligible for office under the current Constitution, a presidential candidate must:

- be a natural born citizen of Liberia (per Art, 27(b) of the Constitution, citizenship is limited to "persons who are Negroes or of Negro descent");
- be at least thirty-five years old;
- own real property valued at least $25,000;
- have resided in Liberia for at least ten years.

Additionally, the president may not be from the same county as the vice president of Liberia.

== Term and election ==
Under the original 1847 Constitution, the president was elected to a two-year term, which was increased to four years on May 7, 1907. Under this amendment, a new president would serve for eight years and could be re-elected to unlimited four-year terms. During the presidency of William Tolbert, the Constitution was amended to restrict the president to a single eight-year term; by 1976, voices in the legislature were being raised in favor of returning to the previous system, but Tolbert proclaimed his support for the existing system and vowed to veto any constitutional amendments to remove term limits.

Currently, the president is elected by popular vote to a six-year term and is limited to two terms. Under the 1986 Constitution, presidential elections utilize a two-round system, wherein a second round of voting is held between the two candidates with the highest number of votes if no single candidate obtains a majority in the first round. Each term begins and ends at noon on the third working Monday in January of the year immediately following the elections. At the time of their inauguration, each president is required under the Constitution to take a presidential oath promising to preserve and defend the Constitution and faithfully execute the law. The oath is administered by the chief justice of Liberia in front of a joint session of the legislature.

== Residence ==
In 2006, the Executive Mansion was under renovations due to a fire that damaged parts of the building in July of that year. The office of the president was transferred to the nearby Foreign Ministry building as a result. On 14 February 2022, the Executive Mansion was reopened.

== List of officeholders ==
Political parties

Republican Party
True Whig Party
National Democratic Party
Liberian People's Party
National Patriotic Party
Liberian Action Party
Unity Party
Congress for Democratic Change

Other affiliations

Military
Independent

Symbols

^{†} Died in office

No.	Portrait	Name (Birth–Death)	Term of office			Political party	Elected	Vice President
No.	Portrait	Name (Birth–Death)	Took office	Left office	Time in office	Political party	Elected	Vice President
1		Joseph Jenkins Roberts (1809–1876)	January 3, 1848	January 7, 1856	8 years, 4 days	Republican Party	1847	Nathaniel Brander
1		Joseph Jenkins Roberts (1809–1876)	January 3, 1848	January 7, 1856	8 years, 4 days	Republican Party	1849	Anthony D. Williams
1		Joseph Jenkins Roberts (1809–1876)	January 3, 1848	January 7, 1856	8 years, 4 days	Republican Party	1851	Anthony D. Williams
1		Joseph Jenkins Roberts (1809–1876)	January 3, 1848	January 7, 1856	8 years, 4 days	Republican Party	1853	Stephen Allen Benson
2		Stephen Allen Benson (1816–1865)	January 7, 1856	January 4, 1864	7 years, 362 days	Republican Party	1855	Beverly Page Yates
2		Stephen Allen Benson (1816–1865)	January 7, 1856	January 4, 1864	7 years, 362 days	Republican Party	1857	Beverly Page Yates
2		Stephen Allen Benson (1816–1865)	January 7, 1856	January 4, 1864	7 years, 362 days	Republican Party	1859	Daniel Bashiel Warner
2		Stephen Allen Benson (1816–1865)	January 7, 1856	January 4, 1864	7 years, 362 days	Republican Party	1861	Daniel Bashiel Warner
3		Daniel Bashiel Warner (1815–1880)	January 4, 1864	January 6, 1868	4 years, 2 days	Republican Party	1863	James M. Priest
3		Daniel Bashiel Warner (1815–1880)	January 4, 1864	January 6, 1868	4 years, 2 days	Republican Party	1865	James M. Priest
4		James Spriggs Payne (1819–1882)	January 6, 1868	January 3, 1870	1 year, 362 days	Republican Party	1867	Joseph Gibson
5		Edward James Roye (1815–1872)	January 3, 1870	October 26, 1871 (Deposed)	1 year, 296 days	True Whig Party	1869	James Skivring Smith
—		Chief Executive Committee; Members: Reginald A. Sherman, Charles Benedict Dunbar, Amos Herring; October 26, 1871 – November 4, 1871			9 days		—	Vacant (October 26, 1871 – January 1, 1872)
6		James Skivring Smith (1825–1892)	November 4, 1871	January 1, 1872	58 days	True Whig Party	—	Vacant (October 26, 1871 – January 1, 1872)
7		Joseph Jenkins Roberts (1809–1876)	January 1, 1872	January 3, 1876	4 years, 2 days	Republican Party	1871	Anthony W. Gardner
7		Joseph Jenkins Roberts (1809–1876)	January 1, 1872	January 3, 1876	4 years, 2 days	Republican Party	1873	Anthony W. Gardner
8		James Spriggs Payne (1819–1882)	January 3, 1876	January 7, 1878	2 years, 4 days	Republican Party	1875	Charles Harmon
9		Anthony W. Gardner (1820–1885)	January 7, 1878	January 20, 1883 (Resigned)	5 years, 13 days	True Whig Party	1877	Alfred Francis Russell
9		Anthony W. Gardner (1820–1885)	January 7, 1878	January 20, 1883 (Resigned)	5 years, 13 days	True Whig Party	1879	Alfred Francis Russell
9		Anthony W. Gardner (1820–1885)	January 7, 1878	January 20, 1883 (Resigned)	5 years, 13 days	True Whig Party	1881	Alfred Francis Russell
10		Alfred Francis Russell (1817–1884)	January 20, 1883	January 7, 1884	352 days	True Whig Party	1881	Vacant (January 20, 1883 – January 7, 1884)
11		Hilary R. W. Johnson (1837–1901)	January 7, 1884	January 4, 1892	7 years, 362 days	True Whig Party	1883	James Thompson
11		Hilary R. W. Johnson (1837–1901)	January 7, 1884	January 4, 1892	7 years, 362 days	True Whig Party	1885	James Thompson
11		Hilary R. W. Johnson (1837–1901)	January 7, 1884	January 4, 1892	7 years, 362 days	True Whig Party	1887	James Thompson
11		Hilary R. W. Johnson (1837–1901)	January 7, 1884	January 4, 1892	7 years, 362 days	True Whig Party	1889	James Thompson
12		Joseph James Cheeseman (1843–1896)	January 4, 1892	November 12, 1896^{[†]}	4 years, 313 days	True Whig Party	1891	William D. Coleman
12		Joseph James Cheeseman (1843–1896)	January 4, 1892	November 12, 1896^{[†]}	4 years, 313 days	True Whig Party	1893	William D. Coleman
12		Joseph James Cheeseman (1843–1896)	January 4, 1892	November 12, 1896^{[†]}	4 years, 313 days	True Whig Party	1895	William D. Coleman
13		William D. Coleman (1842–1908)	November 12, 1896	December 11, 1900	4 years, 29 days	True Whig Party	1895	Vacant (November 12, 1896 – January 3, 1898)
13		William D. Coleman (1842–1908)	November 12, 1896	December 11, 1900	4 years, 29 days	True Whig Party	1897	Joseph J. Ross
13		William D. Coleman (1842–1908)	November 12, 1896	December 11, 1900	4 years, 29 days	True Whig Party	1899	Joseph J. Ross
13		William D. Coleman (1842–1908)	November 12, 1896	December 11, 1900	4 years, 29 days	True Whig Party	1899	Vacant (October 24, 1899 – January 3, 1902)
14		Garretson W. Gibson (1832–1910)	December 11, 1900	January 4, 1904	3 years, 24 days	True Whig Party	1899	Vacant (October 24, 1899 – January 3, 1902)
14		Garretson W. Gibson (1832–1910)	December 11, 1900	January 4, 1904	3 years, 24 days	True Whig Party	1901	Joseph D. Summerville
15		Arthur Barclay (1854–1938)	January 4, 1904	January 1, 1912	7 years, 362 days	True Whig Party	1903	Joseph D. Summerville
15		Arthur Barclay (1854–1938)	January 4, 1904	January 1, 1912	7 years, 362 days	True Whig Party	1903	Vacant (July 27, 1905 – January 1, 1906)
15		Arthur Barclay (1854–1938)	January 4, 1904	January 1, 1912	7 years, 362 days	True Whig Party	1905	J. J. Dossen
15		Arthur Barclay (1854–1938)	January 4, 1904	January 1, 1912	7 years, 362 days	True Whig Party	1907	J. J. Dossen
16		Daniel Edward Howard (1861–1935)	January 1, 1912	January 5, 1920	8 years, 4 days	True Whig Party	1911	Samuel George Harmon
16		Daniel Edward Howard (1861–1935)	January 1, 1912	January 5, 1920	8 years, 4 days	True Whig Party	1915	Samuel George Harmon
17		Charles D. B. King (1875–1961)	January 5, 1920	December 3, 1930 (Resigned)	10 years, 332 days	True Whig Party	1919	Samuel Alfred Ross
17		Charles D. B. King (1875–1961)	January 5, 1920	December 3, 1930 (Resigned)	10 years, 332 days	True Whig Party	1923	Henry Too Wesley
17		Charles D. B. King (1875–1961)	January 5, 1920	December 3, 1930 (Resigned)	10 years, 332 days	True Whig Party	1927	Allen Yancy
18		Edwin Barclay (1882–1955)	December 3, 1930	January 3, 1944	13 years, 31 days	True Whig Party	1927	James Skivring Smith Jr.
18		Edwin Barclay (1882–1955)	December 3, 1930	January 3, 1944	13 years, 31 days	True Whig Party	1931	James Skivring Smith Jr.
18		Edwin Barclay (1882–1955)	December 3, 1930	January 3, 1944	13 years, 31 days	True Whig Party	1935	James Skivring Smith Jr.
19		William Tubman (1895–1971)	January 3, 1944	July 23, 1971^{[†]}	27 years, 201 days	True Whig Party	1943	Clarence Lorenzo Simpson
19		William Tubman (1895–1971)	January 3, 1944	July 23, 1971^{[†]}	27 years, 201 days	True Whig Party	1951	William Tolbert
19		William Tubman (1895–1971)	January 3, 1944	July 23, 1971^{[†]}	27 years, 201 days	True Whig Party	1955	William Tolbert
19		William Tubman (1895–1971)	January 3, 1944	July 23, 1971^{[†]}	27 years, 201 days	True Whig Party	1959	William Tolbert
19		William Tubman (1895–1971)	January 3, 1944	July 23, 1971^{[†]}	27 years, 201 days	True Whig Party	1963	William Tolbert
19		William Tubman (1895–1971)	January 3, 1944	July 23, 1971^{[†]}	27 years, 201 days	True Whig Party	1967	William Tolbert
19		William Tubman (1895–1971)	January 3, 1944	July 23, 1971^{[†]}	27 years, 201 days	True Whig Party	1971	William Tolbert
20		William Tolbert (1913–1980)	July 23, 1971	April 12, 1980 (Assassinated)	8 years, 264 days	True Whig Party	1971	Vacant (July 23, 1971 – April 1972)
20		William Tolbert (1913–1980)	July 23, 1971	April 12, 1980 (Assassinated)	8 years, 264 days	True Whig Party	1971	James Edward Greene
20		William Tolbert (1913–1980)	July 23, 1971	April 12, 1980 (Assassinated)	8 years, 264 days	True Whig Party	1975	James Edward Greene
20		William Tolbert (1913–1980)	July 23, 1971	April 12, 1980 (Assassinated)	8 years, 264 days	True Whig Party	1975	Vacant (July 22, 1977 – October 31, 1977)
20		William Tolbert (1913–1980)	July 23, 1971	April 12, 1980 (Assassinated)	8 years, 264 days	True Whig Party	1975	Bennie Dee Warner
—		Samuel Doe (1951–1990)	Chairman of the People's Redemption Council; April 12, 1980 – January 6, 1986		5 years, 269 days	Military / National Democratic Party		
21		Samuel Doe (1951–1990)	January 6, 1986	September 9, 1990 (Assassinated)	4 years, 246 days	Military / National Democratic Party	1985	Harry Moniba
—		Amos Sawyer (1945–2022)	President of the Interim Government of National Unity; September 9, 1990 – March 7, 1994		3 years, 179 days	Liberian People's Party		
—		David D. Kpormakpor (1935–2010)	Chairman of the Council of State; March 7, 1994 – September 1, 1995		1 year, 178 days	Independent		
—		Wilton G. S. Sankawulo (1937–2009)	Chairman of the Council of State; September 1, 1995 – September 3, 1996		1 year, 2 days	Independent		
—		Ruth Perry (1939–2017)	Chairman of the Council of State; September 3, 1996 – August 2, 1997		333 days	Independent		
22		Charles Taylor (born 1948)	August 2, 1997	August 11, 2003 (Resigned)	6 years, 9 days	National Patriotic Party	1997	Enoch Dogolea
22		Charles Taylor (born 1948)	August 2, 1997	August 11, 2003 (Resigned)	6 years, 9 days	National Patriotic Party	1997	Vacant (June 24, 2000 – July 24, 2000)
22		Charles Taylor (born 1948)	August 2, 1997	August 11, 2003 (Resigned)	6 years, 9 days	National Patriotic Party	1997	Moses Blah
23		Moses Blah (1947–2013)	August 11, 2003	October 14, 2003 (Resigned)	64 days	National Patriotic Party	1997	Vacant (August 11, 2003 – October 14, 2003)
—		Gyude Bryant (1949–2014)	Chairman of the Transitional Government; October 14, 2003 – January 16, 2006		2 years, 94 days	Liberian Action Party		
24		Ellen Johnson Sirleaf (born 1938)	January 16, 2006	January 22, 2018	12 years, 6 days	Unity Party	2005	Joseph Boakai
24		Ellen Johnson Sirleaf (born 1938)	January 16, 2006	January 22, 2018	12 years, 6 days	Unity Party	2011	Joseph Boakai
25		George Weah (born 1966)	January 22, 2018	January 22, 2024	6 years	Congress for Democratic Change	2017	Jewel Taylor
26		Joseph Boakai (born 1944)	January 22, 2024	Incumbent	2 years, 265 days	Unity Party	2023	Jeremiah Koung

== See also ==
- Lists of office-holders
- List of current heads of state and government

History:

- Agents and governors of Liberia
