= 1935 in Liberia =

- Decades: 1910s; 1920s; 1930s; 1940s; 1950s
- See also: Other events of 1935; Timeline of Liberian history

The following lists events that happened during 1935 in Liberia.

== Incumbents ==
- President: Edwin Barclay
- Vice President: James Skivring Smith, Jr.
- Chief Justice: F. E. R. Johnson

== Events ==
=== May ===
- May 7 - Liberian constitutional referendum, 1935
