= Thomas J. R. Faulkner =

Liberian politician (1869-1943)

Thomas Jefferson Richelieu Faulkner (1869 – February 2, 1943) was a Liberian businessman, engineer, and politician.

== Biography ==
Thomas J. R. Faulkner was born in 1869 in North Carolina. He immigrated from the United States to Liberia in 1881. Faulkner was a pan-Africanist and Methodist.

An engineer and businessman, Faulkner first introduced and established electricity and telephones in Liberia. He established the first ice factory in the country as well. Faulkner served one term as mayor of Monrovia during World War I. During his tenure, the city was bombarded by a German U-boat.

Faulkner served as Samuel G. Harmon's running mate during the 1923 presidential election. Harmon and Faulkner ran on the People's Party ticket. They were defeated by incumbent President Charles D. B. King.

Faulkner ran for president in the 1927 election as the candidate of the People's Party. According to the Historical Dictionary of Liberia, Faulkner campaigned on "reform, increased immigration, native rights and elimination of taxes on indigenous Liberians." He opposed the incumbent president, Charles D. B. King of the True Whig Party (TWP). The election was fraudulent, with President King declared the winner of the election with more votes than there were voters in the country.

Following his loss in the election, in 1929, Faulkner began to accuse Liberian government officials of exploiting indigenous Liberians for forced labor. Faulkner's accusations reached the United States and the League of Nations. The accusations culminated in a League of Nations inquiry into the matter in 1930. The resultant report ultimately confirmed the use of coercive, forced labor in Liberia, and accused various government officials, including Vice President Allen Yancy, of utilizing forced labor for private use. King resigned in the aftermath of the League inquiry, and Secretary of State Edwin Barclay became president.

Faulkner contested the presidency with the People's Party again in the 1931 election. He was defeated by incumbent President Barclay.

Faulkner died on February 2, 1943. In 1967, the Mount Coffee Hydropower Project was, in part, named for Faulkner. In 1974, the Thomas J. R. Faulkner College of Science and Technology, a part of the University of Liberia, was established and named after Faulkner.
