= Ernest Barclay =

Liberian politician

Ernest James Barclay
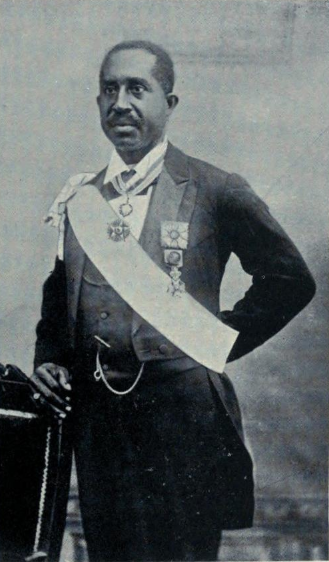

18th Secretary of State
- In office 1884–1888
- President: Hilary R. W. Johnson
- Preceded by: Garretson W. Gibson
- Succeeded by: William McCall Davis

20th Secretary of State
- In office 1890–1892
- President: Joseph James Cheeseman
- Preceded by: William McCall Davis
- Succeeded by: Arthur Barclay

Personal details
- Born: 26 September 1849 Bridgetown, Barbados
- Died: 1894 (aged 44–45) Liberia
- Children: One

Ernest J. Barclay was the older brother of Arthur Barclay and the father of Edwin James Barclay. Like them, he was an Americo-Liberian politician.

== Early life ==
Ernest Barclay was born in Bridgetown, Barbados, as one of the twelve children of Sarah Ann Bourne Barclay, the daughter of London Bourne. His father Anthony Barclay Jr. led the Barbados Emigration Society (alternatively, the Barbados Colonization Society) that organized the 1865 exodus of 346 people from Bridgetown to Liberia. When his father died in 1866 soon afterwards, his mother Sarah took over leading the Barbadian immigrant community in Liberia while continuing to parent her 10 surviving children.

== Later life ==
Ernest J. Barclay twice served as Liberia's Secretary of State, his second term likely cut short by an illness that he would later pass away from. He also served as an Associate Justice of the Supreme Court. At some point shortly before his premature death, he had an affair with Isabel Williams and they had a child out of wedlock they named Edwin James Barclay. It may be noted that an older source lists his death year as 1894, while a newer source lists it as 1896.
