= 1911 Liberian general election =

- 1911
- Presidential election
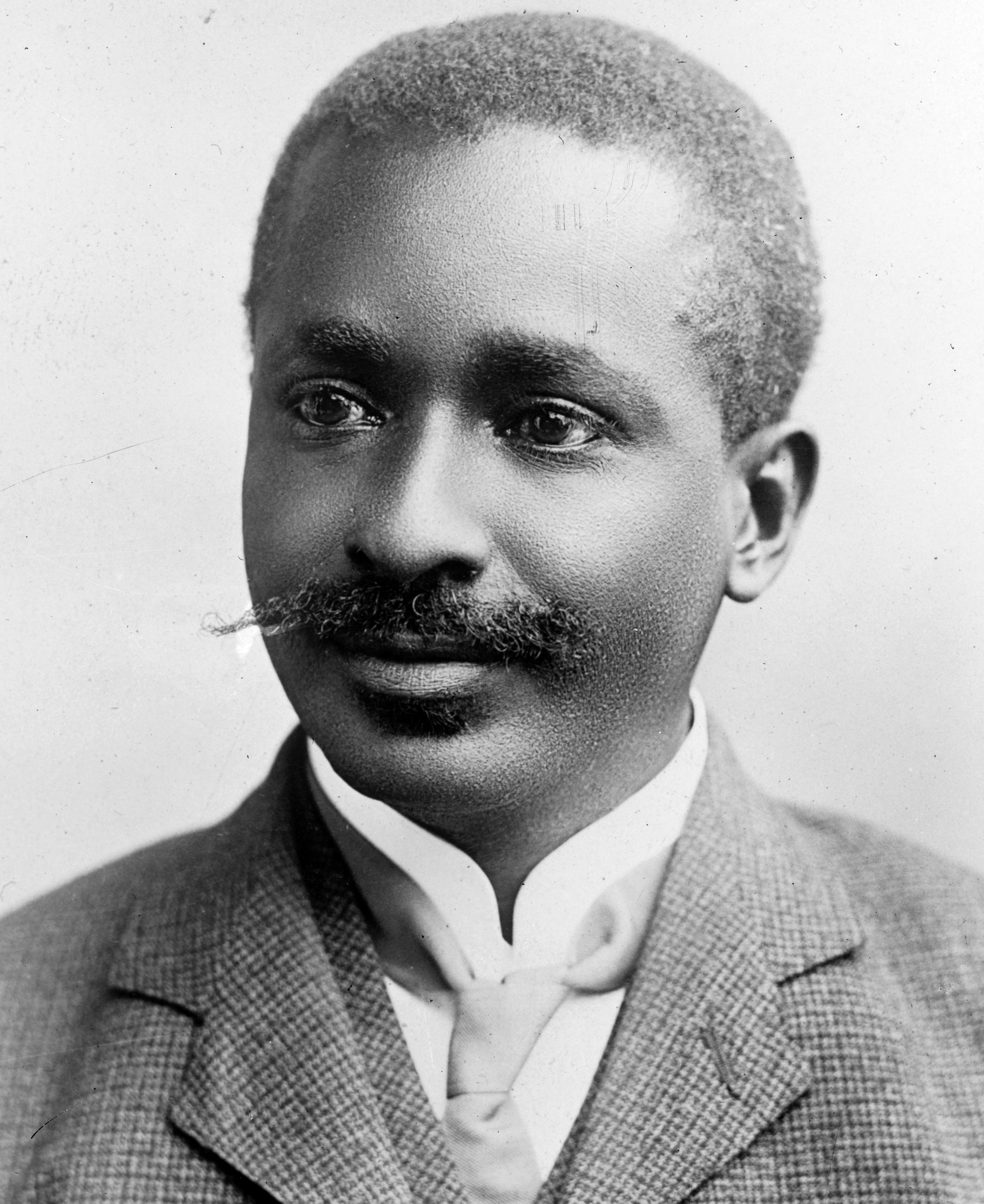

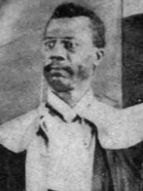
Nominee	Daniel Edward Howard	J. J. Dossen
Party	True Whig Party	Republican
President before election
Arthur Barclay
TWP
Elected President
Daniel Edward Howard
TWP

General elections were held in Liberia in 1911. In the presidential election, the result was a victory for Daniel Edward Howard of the True Whig Party, who defeated J. J. Dossen of the Republican Party. He took office on 1 January 1912.
