= 1935 Liberian general election =

- Presidential election
- 7 May 1935
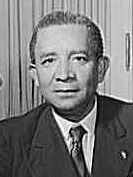

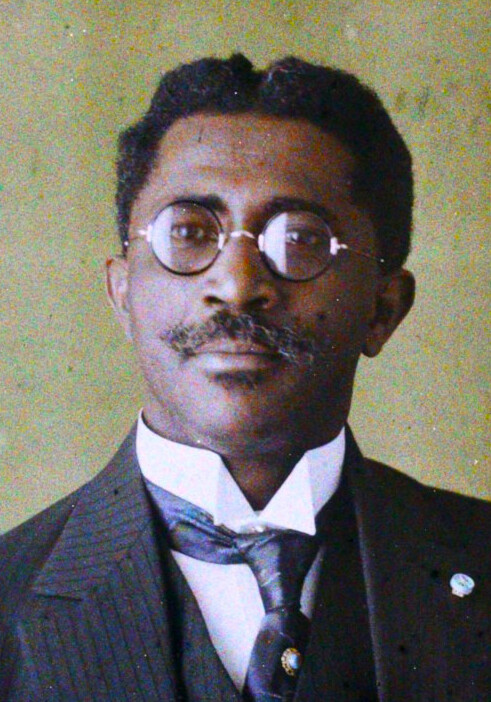
| Nominee | Edwin Barclay | Charles D. B. King |
| Party | TWP | People's Party |
| Popular vote | 344,569 | 7,784 |
| Percentage | 97.79% | 2.21% |
President before election
Edwin Barclay
TWP
Elected President
Edwin Barclay
TWP

General elections were held in Liberia on 7 May 1935, alongside a constitutional referendum. Incumbent President Edwin Barclay of the True Whig Party was re-elected with 98% of the vote, defeating former President Charles D. B. King who ran with the support of the People's Party and Unit Whigs.

The constitutional amendments were approved in the simultaneous referendum, extending the presidential term to eight years, meaning the next presidential election would be in 1943.

== Results ==
=== President ===
| Candidate | Party | Votes | % |
|---|---|---|---|
| Edwin Barclay | True Whig Party | 344,569 | 97.79 |
| Charles D. B. King | People's Party–Unit Whigs | 7,784 | 2.21 |
| Total | | 352,353 | 100.00 |
Source: Time
