= 1919 Liberian general election =

- May 1919
- Presidential election
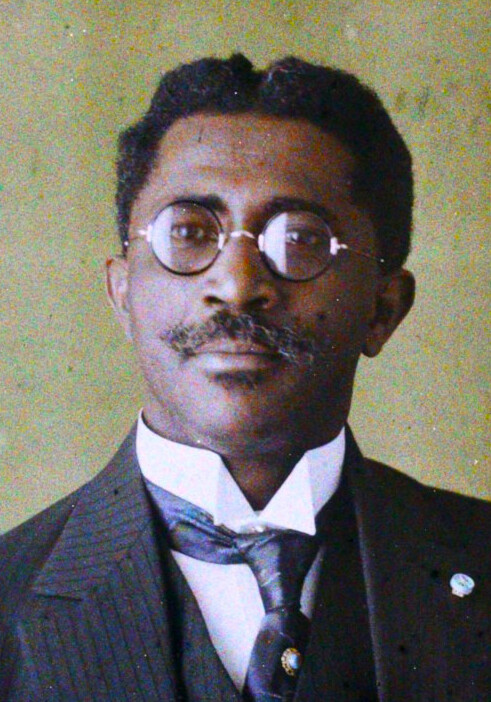
Nominee	Charles D. B. King
Party	TWP
President before election
Daniel Edward Howard
TWP
Elected President
Charles D. B. King
TWP

General elections were held in Liberia in May 1919. In the presidential election, the result was a victory for Charles D. B. King of the True Whig Party. King took office on 5 January 1920.
