= 1903 Liberian general election =

- 1903
- Presidential election
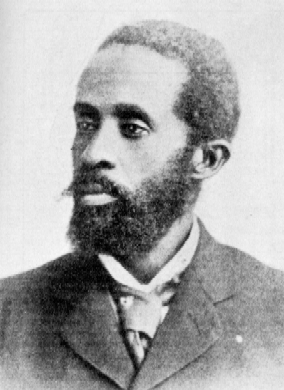

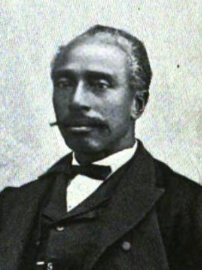
Nominee	Arthur Barclay	William D. Coleman
Party	True Whig Party	People's Party
President before election
Garreston W. Gibson
TWP
Elected President
Arthur Barclay
TWP

General elections were held in Liberia in 1903. In the presidential election Arthur Barclay of the True Whig Party was elected. He defeated former President William D. Coleman, who ran on the People's Party ticket. Barclay took office on 4 January 1904
