= 1897 Liberian general election =

- 1897
- Presidential election
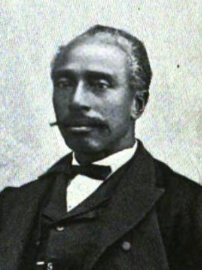
Nominee	William D. Coleman
Party	TWP
President before election
Joseph James Cheeseman
TWP
Elected President
William D. Coleman
TWP

General elections were held in Liberia in May 1897. In the presidential election, incumbent William D. Coleman of the True Whig Party (the sole legal party) was elected. The former Vice-President had originally taken office following the death of President Joseph James Cheeseman in November 1896.
