= 1881 Liberian general election =

- May 1881
- Presidential election
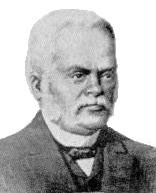

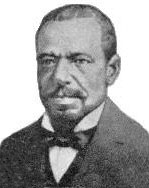
Nominee	Anthony W. Gardner	Joseph James Cheeseman
Party	TWP	Republican
President before election
Anthony W. Gardner
TWP
Elected President
Anthony W. Gardner
TWP

General elections were held in Liberia in May 1881. The presidential election resulted in a victory for incumbent President Anthony W. Gardner of the True Whig Party against Republican nominee Joseph James Cheeseman.
