= Rainbow Alliance (Liberia) =

Political alliance in Liberia

The Rainbow Alliance (RA) is a political alliance in Liberia. As of March 2022, its current constituent parties are the Victory for Change Party, True Whig Party, and Democratic Justice Party.

== History ==
By June 2020, twelve political parties had signed a declaration of intent to collaborate and create a political alliance. The parties signatory to the declaration were: Victory for Change Party (VCP), Vision for Liberia Transformation (VOLT), Democratic Justice Party (DJP), Movement for Economic Empowerment (MOVEE), Grassroots Democratic Party of Liberia (GDPL), Redemption Democratic Congress (RDC), Change Democratic Action (CDA), New Liberia Party (NLP), Liberia Restoration Party (LRP), People's Unification Party (PUP), True Whig Party (TWP), and Union of Liberian Democrats (ULD). The RA was founded with the purpose of contesting the 2023 presidential election. It also sought to minimize the number of political parties in Liberia. The Collaborating Political Parties thanked the RA in its efforts toward achieving this goal.

On August 31, 2020, the RA was certified by the National Elections Commission (NEC), with seven constituent parties. The parties were the VCP, VOLT, DJP, MOVEE, RDC, ULD, and TWP. Leader of the TWP, Reginald B Goodridge Sr., served as the interim chairman of the alliance. Goodridge had previously served as information minister under Charles Taylor. At the time of its founding, the RA was the largest group in Liberia in terms of number of constituent political parties. The RA opposed the 2020 referendum, claiming it to be unconstitutional. The RA unsuccessfully participated the 2020 Senate elections with 10 candidates.

In July 2021, the RA made its framework document public. By March 2022, VOLT withdrew from the RA. By October 2022, MOVEE withdrew from the RA. In March 2022, the ULD and RDC left the alliance. The RA complained to the Board of Commissioners of the NEC that the ULD and RDC left without following the procedures for withdrawal, including paying dues. The Board of Commissioners sided with the ULD and RDC, ruling that the framework document, which superseded the RA planning document, contained no penalty for withdrawing from the RA.

The RA held its first national convention on October 29, 2022, in Paynesville. Interim Chairman Goodridge was elected standard bearer of the alliance. The RA did not run a candidate the 2023 presidential election. In the 2023 Senate election, one RA candidate, Ranney B. Jackson, ran for office in Bong County unsuccessfully. The RA also participated in the 2023 House elections with no victories.
