= 1915 Liberian general election =

- 1915
- Presidential election
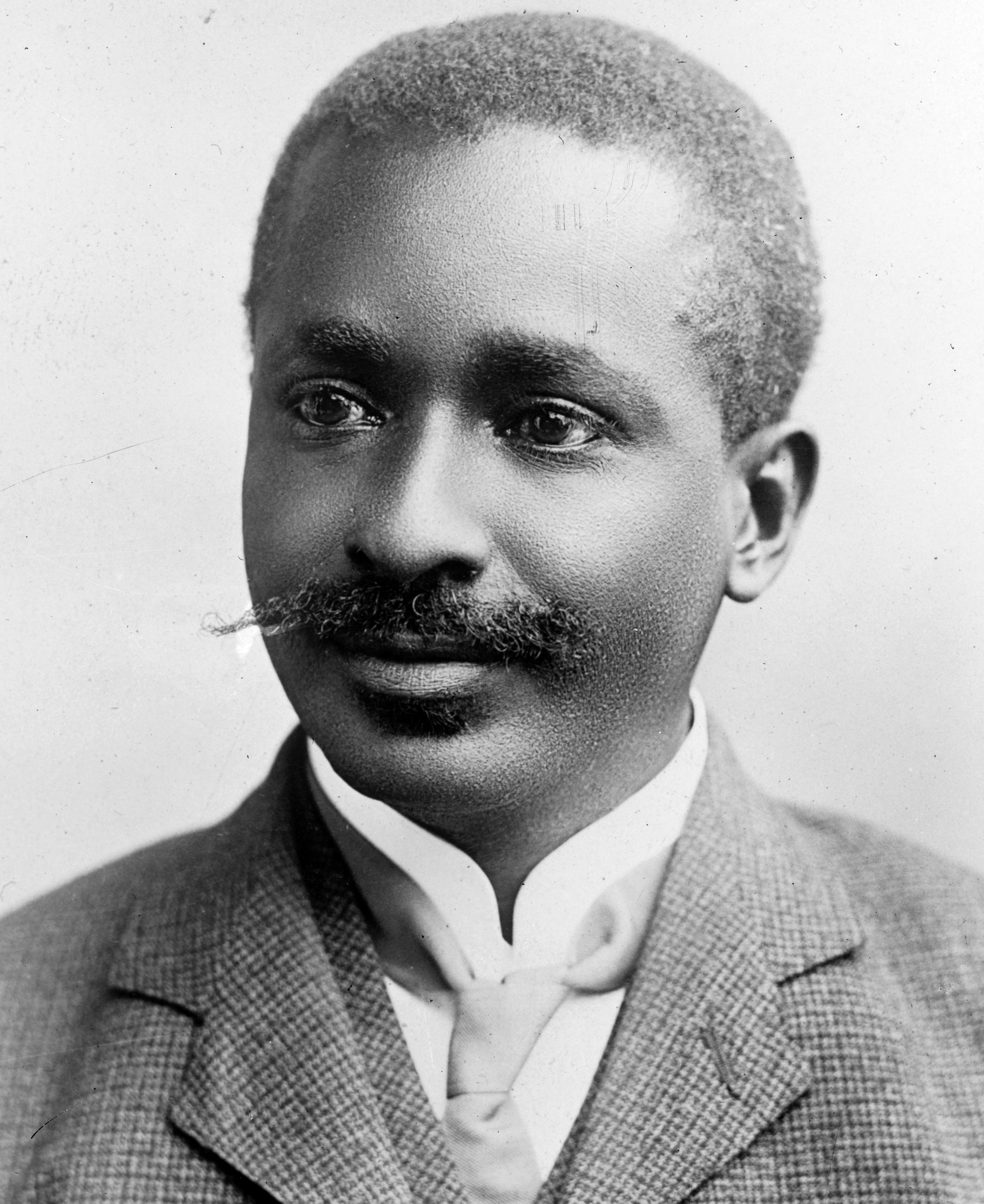
Nominee	Daniel Edward Howard
Party	True Whig Party
President before election
Daniel Edward Howard
TWP
Elected President
Daniel Edward Howard
TWP

General elections were held in Liberia in 1915. The presidential election resulted in a victory for incumbent president Daniel Edward Howard of the True Whig Party, who was re-elected for a second term.
