= 1927 Liberian general election =

Fraudulent election

- 3 May 1927
- Registered: 19,000
- Presidential election
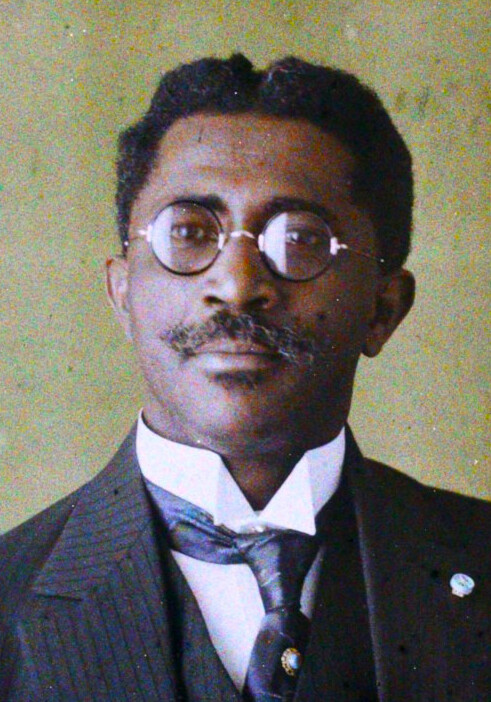

| Nominee | Charles D. B. King | Thomas J. R. Faulkner |
| Party | TWP | People's Party |
| Popular vote | 229,527 | 8,992 |
| Percentage | 96.23% | 3.77% |
President before election
Charles D. B. King
TWP
Elected President
Charles D. B. King
TWP

General elections were held in Liberia in 1927. In the presidential election the result was a victory for Charles D. B. King of the True Whig Party, who was re-elected for a third term after defeating Thomas J. R. Faulkner of the People's Party. Faulkner had previously served as the mayor of Monrovia, and ran a campaign based on reform of labor laws.

The elections have been referred to as "the most rigged ever" by Frances Johnson-Morris, a modern head of the country's National Elections Commission, and were listed in the Guinness Book of Records as the most fraudulent election in history. Despite there being only 19,000 registered voters, according to the official results, King received around 230,000 votes to Faulkner's 9,000.

== Results ==
| Candidate | Party | Votes | % |
|---|---|---|---|
| Charles D. B. King | True Whig Party | 229,527 | 96.23 |
| Thomas J. R. Faulkner | People's Party | 8,992 | 3.77 |
| Total | | 238,519 | 100.00 |
Source: Saye Guannu

Some sources, such as American University scholar Harold D. Nelson, have suggested that King received 24,000 votes to Faulkner's 9,000.

== Aftermath ==
Following the elections, Faulkner accused members of the True Whig Party government of using slave labor and selling slaves to the Spanish colony of Fernando Po, as well as involving the army in the process. Despite the government's denials and a refusal to cooperate, the League of Nations established the "International Commission of Inquiry into the Existence of Slavery and Forced Labor in the Republic of Liberia", under the chairmanship of British jurist Cuthbert Christy, to determine the extent of the problem. U.S. president Herbert Hoover briefly suspended relations to press Monrovia into compliance. In 1930 the committee's report was published, and although it could not substantiate charges of slavery and forced labor, it implicated government officials, including both King and vice president Allen Yancy of profiting from forced labor, which it equated to slavery. There were also suggestions about putting Liberia into trusteeship. As a result, the House of Representatives began impeachment procedures against King, who quickly resigned. He was succeeded by Edwin Barclay. Faulkner contested the 1931 elections, but was again declared the loser.
