= Ellen Mills Scarbrough =

Liberian politician

Member of the House of Representatives
- In office 1960–

Personal details
- Born: 13 November 1900; Arthington, Liberia
- Died: March 1983; Monrovia, Liberia

Ellen Mills Scarbrough (13 November 1900 – March 1983) was a Liberian educator and politician. She was elected to the House of Representatives in 1959, becoming the first woman in the Legislature.

== Biography ==
Mills Scarbrough was born in Arthington in 1900. After studying at the College of West Africa, she attended Howard University in Washington, D.C., where she earned a BA. She then gained an MA from Columbia University. Returning to Liberia, she worked as a teacher. In 1947 she was a member of the Liberian Delegation to the United Nations. The following year, she was appointed assistant secretary of public instruction. Four years later she was promoted to assistant secretary. She was also made an honorary Doctor of Education by the University of Liberia.

In 1959 she was elected to the House of Representatives, becoming the first woman to sit in either the House or the Senate. She also served as president of the National Federation of Liberian Women.

She later donated land to the government, on which the Catherine Mills mental hospital was established. She died in Monrovia in March 1983.
