= Rump party =

Remains of political party

A rump party is a political party that is formed by the remaining body of supporters and leaders who do not support a breakaway group that merges with another party, or forms a new party. The rump party can have the name of the original party, or a new name.

Examples:

- Alliance (New Zealand political party), following the departure of Green Party of Aotearoa New Zealand
- Alberta Liberal Party
- Bavaria Party
- The pro-protectionism Conservative Party in the UK after the breakaway of the free trade Peelite faction in 1846 over the repeal of the corn laws.
- Sinn Féin following the loss of most members to Cumann na nGaedheal and Fianna Fáil in the 1920s
- Diverse conservative parties in Canada
  - Alberta Social Credit Party, renamed to Pro-Life Alberta Political Association in 2017
  - British Columbia Social Credit Party, dissolved in 2023
  - BC United, rump party of the British Columbia Liberal Party
  - Conservative Party of British Columbia, until 2024
  - Progressive Conservative Association of Alberta, in the 1920s to 1960s and again in the late 2010s
  - Progressive Conservative Party of Canada after the 1993 election
  - Progressive Canadian Party, under Ernie Schreiber and later Sinclair Stevens, the remnants of the former Progressive Conservative Party of Canada that opposed the merger with the Canadian Alliance.
  - Progressive Conservative Party of Saskatchewan since the formation of the Saskatchewan Party
  - Union Nationale (Quebec), dissolved in 1989
- United Labour Party in New Zealand which had a remnant made up of moderates who did not join the new, more radical, Social Democratic Party.
- Felicity Party, the successor of Virtue Party but was mostly replaced by the more moderate Justice and Development Party
- Lega Nord, legally continues to exist but was de facto replaced by Lega
- Liberal Party (UK, 1989)
- Centre Party (Germany)
- Greater Romania Party
- National Party (South Africa) under leadership of DF Malan after formation of the United Party. NP still remained relatively strong.
- New National Party (South Africa), the new name of what remained of National Party under the leadership of FW de Klerk and Marthinus van Schalkwyk.
- Opposition Party (Southern U.S.) in the southern United States from 1858 to 1860
- The pro-Petre Roman wing of the National Salvation Front which transformed in 1993 into the Democratic Party
- Party of the Democratic Left (Slovakia, 2005), dissolved in 2015
- Progress Party (Denmark)
- The Rassemblement-UMP (Gathering-Union for a Popular Movement) was an ephemeral French legislative group, led by former Prime Minister François Fillon, which split from the Union for a Popular Movement in November 2012 after the internal contestation which followed the election of the party's president. Created on November 27, 2012, this dissident group was reintegrated with the UMP's parliamentary group after negotiations between the two rivals on January 16, 2013.
- The Republicans (Germany)
- Saskatchewan Liberal Party, abandoned the liberal label in 2023
- Serbian Radical Party
- Social Democratic Party (UK, 1990–present)
- Social Democratic Party of Hungary
- Social Democratic Party (Japan)
- Tricolour Flame, formed after the formation of National Alliance (Italy)
- True Whig Party

Communist rump parties often a result of the transition of communist parties to social democracy:

- Brazilian Communist Party
- Communist Party of Britain
- Communist Party of Finland (1994)
- Communist Party of Germany (1990)
- Communist Party of Luxembourg
- Communist Party of Slovakia, shortly regained representation in 2002
- Communist Party of Sweden (1995)
- Communist Refoundation Party, formed in reaction to Democratic Party of the Left. It remained originally an important party but was later replaced by Left Ecology Freedom formed by different splitter groups from PRC and PDS.
- Hungarian Workers' Party
