= J. J. Dossen =

Liberian politician and judge

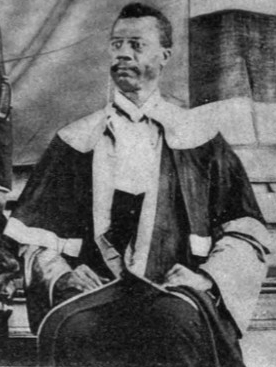

16th Vice President of Liberia
- In office January 1, 1906 – January 1, 1912
- President: Arthur Barclay
- Preceded by: Joseph D. Summerville
- Succeeded by: Samuel George Harmon

8th Chief Justice of Liberia
- In office 1913–1924
- Nominated by: Daniel Edward Howard
- Preceded by: James A. Toliver
- Succeeded by: F. E. R. Johnson

Personal details
- Born: c. 1866; Maryland County, Liberia
- Died: August 17, 1924; Monrovia, Liberia
- Political party: True Whig Party

James Jenkins Dossen (c.1866 – August 17, 1924) was a Liberian politician and jurist, serving as the 16th vice president of Liberia from 1906 to 1912 under President Arthur Barclay. He was elected president of the Liberia College in 1913 and served as associate justice of the Supreme Court of Liberia for 10 years, before being elevated to the position of Chief Justice for 13 years. The J. J. Dossen Memorial Hospital in Harper, Maryland County, one of the hospitals in south-eastern Liberia, is named after him.

Political offices
Preceded by Joseph D. Summerville	Vice President of Liberia; 1906 – 1912	Succeeded by Samuel Alfred Ross
Legal offices
Preceded by James A. Toliver	Chief Justice of Liberia; 1912 – 1924	Succeeded by F. E. R. Johnson
