= 1895 Liberian general election =

- 1895
- Presidential election
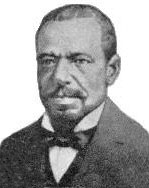
Nominee	Joseph James Cheeseman
Party	TWP
President before election
Joseph James Cheeseman
TWP
Elected President
Joseph James Cheeseman
TWP

General elections were held in Liberia in 1895. In the presidential election, incumbent Joseph James Cheeseman of the True Whig Party (the sole legal party) was re-elected for a third term.
