= 1907 Liberian general election =

- 1907
- Presidential election
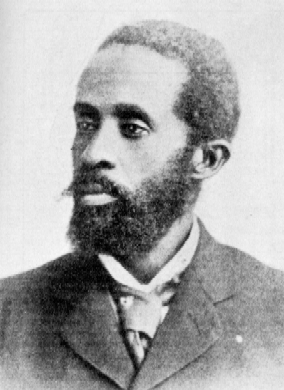
Nominee	Arthur Barclay
Party	True Whig Party
President before election
Arthur Barclay
TWP
Elected President
Arthur Barclay
TWP

General elections were held in Liberia in 1907. In the presidential election Arthur Barclay of the True Whig Party was re-elected for a third term. It was the first time a President had been elected to a four-year term, as all had previously served for two years.
