= 1931 Liberian general election =

- 1931
- Presidential election
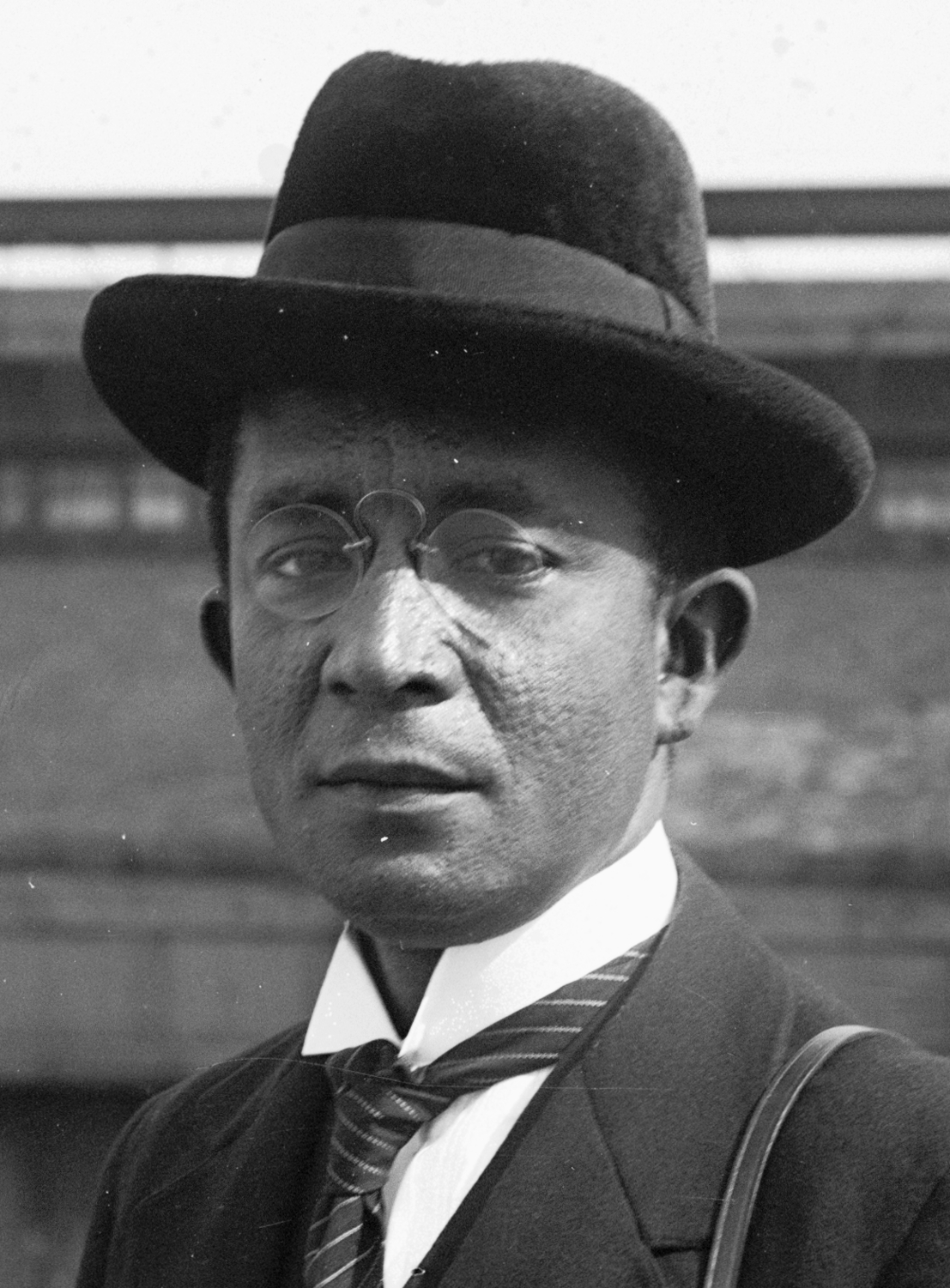

Nominee	Edwin Barclay	Thomas J. R. Faulkner
Party	TWP	People's Party
President before election
Edwin Barclay
TWP
Elected President
Edwin Barclay
TWP

General elections were held in Liberia in 1931. In the presidential election, incumbent Edwin Barclay of the True Whig Party (who had originally taken office following the resignation of Charles D. B. King in December 1930) was challenged by Thomas J. R. Faulkner of the People's Party, who had lost to Charles D. B. King in the heavily rigged 1927 elections. Although Faulkner increased his vote share, particularly in Monrovia, where he only narrowly lost, Barclay was elected to a first full term in office.

== Campaign ==
Immigration was one of the campaign issues, with Faulkner calling for unrestricted immigration for African Americans, while Barclay sought to restrict it to skilled immigrants.

Momulu Massaquoi had also sought to run for the presidency, but, concerned by his popularity, Barclay tried to persuade him not to run by offering him a ministerial position. After this failed, Barclay launched a series of frivolous lawsuits against Massaquoi that prevented him contesting the elections. Although Massaquoi successfully defended the lawsuits, the legal process did not finish until after the elections had taken place.
