= 1901 Liberian general election =

- 1901
- Presidential election
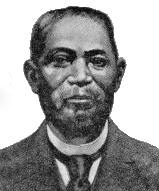

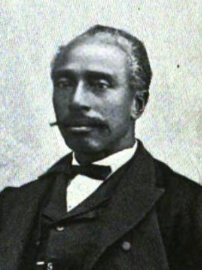
Nominee	Garreston W. Gibson	William D. Coleman
Party	True Whig Party	People's Party
President before election
William D. Coleman
TWP
Elected President
Garreston W. Gibson
TWP

General elections were held in Liberia in 1901. In the presidential election, incumbent Garreston W. Gibson of the True Whig Party was elected for the first time. He had originally taken office following the resignation of William D. Coleman in December 1900. Gibson defeated Coleman, who ran on the People's Party ticket.
