= 1955 Liberian general election =

- 3 May 1955
- Presidential election
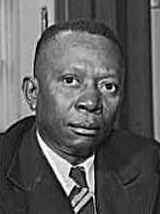

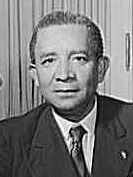
Nominee	William Tubman	Edwin Barclay
Party	TWP	ITWP
Popular vote	244,873	1,182
Percentage	99.51%	0.48%
President before election
William Tubman
TWP
Elected President
William Tubman
TWP

General elections were held in Liberia in May 1955. For the first time since 1931 there was more than one candidate in the presidential election. However, William Tubman of the True Whig Party was easily re-elected, winning over 99.5% of the vote.

After the election, Edwin Barclay claimed ballot stuffing due to the purported number of votes cast being higher than the number of registered voters. His party, the Independent True Whig Party (ITWP), was subsequently banned following an assassination attempt against Tubman.

== Results ==
Party	Presidential candidate	Votes	%	Seats	
Party	Presidential candidate	Votes	%	House	Senate
True Whig Party	William Tubman	244,873	99.51	29	10
Independent True Whig Party	Edwin Barclay	1,182	0.48	0	0
Independent Presidential Party	William O. Davies-Bright	16	0.01	0	0
Total		246,071	100.00	29	10
Source: Sternberger et al., Nohlen et al.
