= 1971 Liberian general election =

- 4 May 1971
- Presidential election
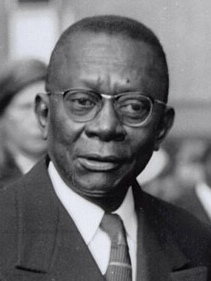
Nominee	William Tubman
Party	TWP
Running mate	William Tolbert
Popular vote	714,005
Percentage	100%
President before election
William Tubman
TWP
Elected President
William Tubman
TWP

General elections were held in Liberia on 4 May 1971. In the presidential election, incumbent William Tubman of the True Whig Party was the only candidate, and was re-elected unopposed. In the legislative elections, the True Whig Party won all 52 seats in the House of Representatives.

== Results ==
=== President ===
Candidate	Party	Votes	%
William Tubman	True Whig Party	714,005	100.00
Total		714,005	100.00
Source: African Elections Database

=== House of Representatives ===
Party	Seats
True Whig Party	52
Total	52
Source: IPU
