= 1923 Liberian general election =

Fraudulent election

- 1923
- Registered: <6,000
- Turnout: >750%
- Presidential election
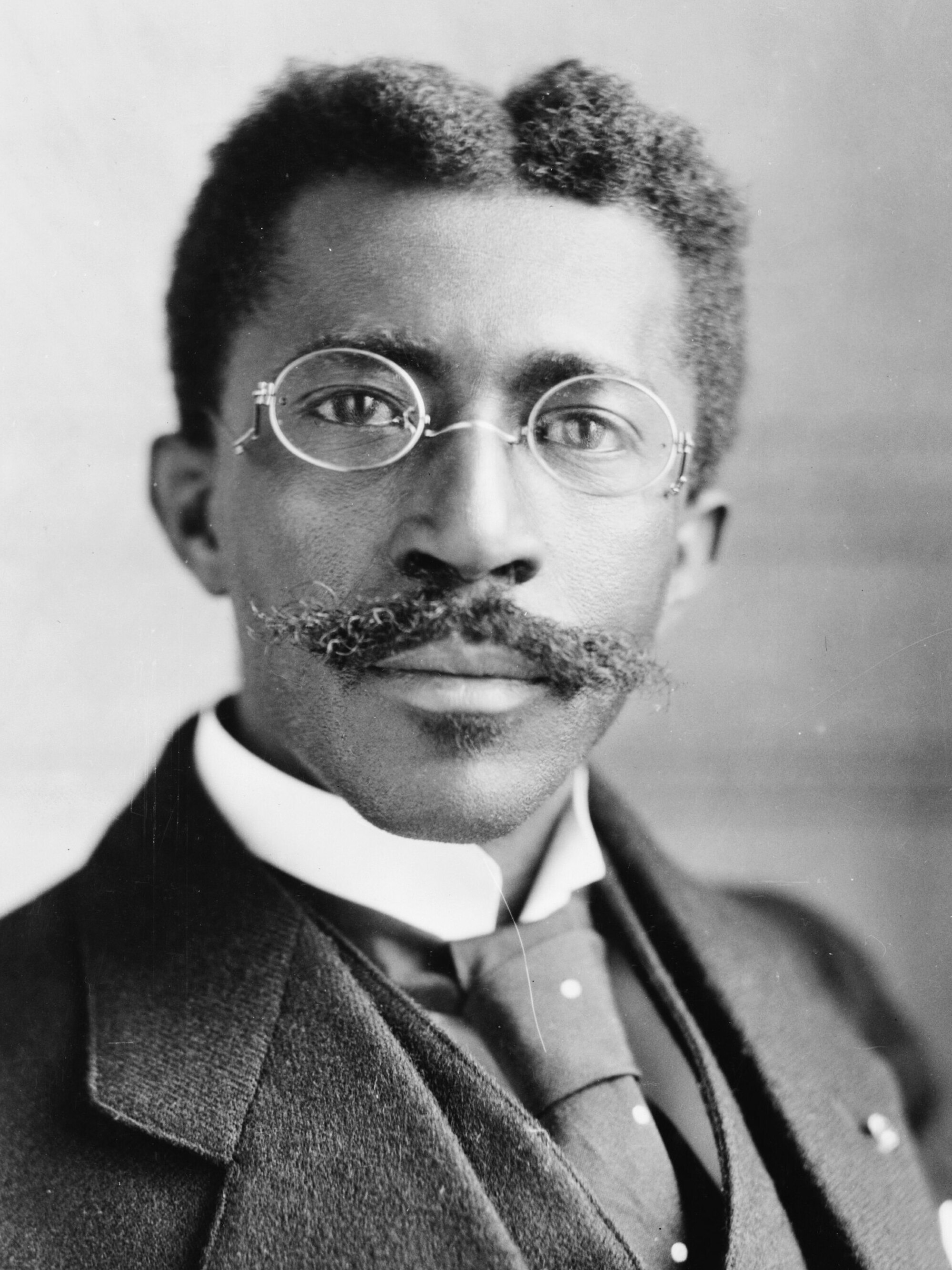

Nominee	Charles D. B. King	Samuel G. Harmon
Party	TWP	People's Party
Running mate		Thomas J. R. Faulkner
Popular vote	45,000
President before election
Charles D. B. King
TWP
Elected President
Charles D. B. King
TWP

General elections were held in Liberia in 1923. In the presidential elections, the result was a victory for Charles D. B. King of the True Whig Party, who was re-elected for a second term, defeating Samuel G. Harmon, former vice president, of the People's Party. Thomas J. R. Faulkner served as Harmon's running mate.

The results of the election were rigged, with King receiving 45,000 votes, despite there being only 6,000 Liberians eligible to vote.
