= 1935 Liberian constitutional referendum =

A constitutional referendum was held in Liberia on 7 May 1935 alongside general elections. The changes to the constitution included extednting the presidential term from four to eight years. Although this was claimed to be for economic reasons, the government feared that an election may lead to instability that would lower confidence of foreign powers and creditors. As a result, the next presidential elections took place in 1943.

== Background ==
On 26 November 1934 the Legislature approved a term extension for the President. As this required amending the constitution, article 17 of chapter V of the constitution dictated that a referendum was required, with a two-thirds majority needed for the amendments to be passed.

== Changes to the constitution ==
The referendum proposed modifying article 1 of chapter III of the constitution regarding the presidential term, whilst adding a new section to article 5 of chapter III regarding the civil service.

Section	Original text	Proposed text
Chapter III, Article 1, Section 1	The supreme executive power shall be vested in a President, who shall be elected by the people, and shall hold this office for the term of four years and be elected quadrennially	The supreme executive power shall be vested in a President, who shall be elected by the people, and shall hold office for the term of eight years. No president shall be elected for two consecutive terms.
Chapter III, Article 5, Section 2	–	The Legislature shall pass a standing law organizing and regulating the Civil Service of the Republic, which law shall declare what offices may be controlled by the provisions of said law. The provisions of this section of the Constitution relating to tenure of office shall not apply to offices falling within the provisions of the Civil Service law.
Source: Direct Democracy
