= Reginald Goodridge =

Liberian politician

Minister of Culture, Information and Tourism

Personal details
- Born: 11 November 1952 (age 73) Liberia
- Party: True Whig Party (after 2005); National Patriotic Party (before 2005)

Reginald Goodridge (born 11 November 1952) is a Liberian politician and former government minister. Goodridge was born in Liberia in 1952. He was a member of Charles Taylor's National Patriotic party and served as a press secretary to Taylor following his election as Liberian president. He also served as Liberian minister for Culture, Information, Tourism of Liberia. Following the end of the Second Liberian Civil War, Goodridge argued that there would be "bloodbath" in the country if Taylor was forced to resign. In 2005, Goodridge left the National Patriotic Party and joined the new version of the True Whig Party (TWP). He was appointed as the TWP's chairman in 2015. In 2021, Goodridge led a campaign for the reburial and an official memorial service, for TWP government officials who were killed during the 1980 Liberian coup d'état. By May 2025, the TWP executive committee passed a vote of no confidence against Chairman Goodridge. They accused Goodridge of not scheduling a national convention to elect new party officers, despite party's constitution requiring it.
