= 1879 Liberian general election =

- May 1879
- Presidential election
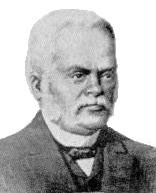
| Nominee | Anthony W. Gardner |
| Party | TWP |
President before election
Anthony W. Gardner
TWP
Elected President
Anthony W. Gardner
TWP

General elections were held in Liberia in May 1879. Incumbent president Anthony W. Gardner of the True Whig Party was the only candidate in the presidential elections, and was elected unopposed.
