= 1963 Liberian general election =

- 7 May 1963
- Presidential election
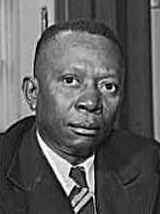
Nominee	William Tubman
Party	TWP
Popular vote	565,044
Percentage	100%
President before election
William Tubman
TWP
Elected President
William Tubman
TWP

General elections were held in Liberia on 7 May 1963. In the presidential election, incumbent William Tubman of the True Whig Party was the only candidate, and was re-elected unopposed.

== Results ==
Candidate	Party	Votes	%
William Tubman	True Whig Party	565,044	100.00
Total		565,044	100.00
Source: African Elections Database
