= 1959 Liberian general election =

- 5 May 1959
- Presidential election
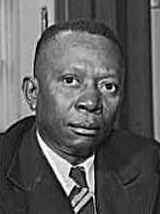

Nominee	William Tubman	William O. Davies-Bright
Party	TWP	Independent
Popular vote	530,566	55
Percentage	99.99%	0.01%
President before election
William Tubman
TWP
Elected President
William Tubman
TWP

General elections were held in Liberia in May 1959. In the presidential election, William Tubman of the True Whig Party was re-elected for a fourth term, defeating independent candidate William O. Davies Bright, who received just 55 votes. For the first time, a woman was elected to the legislature, with Ellen Mills Scarbrough winning a seat in the House of Representatives.

== Results ==
=== President ===
Candidate	Party	Votes	%
William Tubman	True Whig Party	530,566	99.99
William O. Davies Bright	Independent	55	0.01
Total		530,621	100.00
Source: Nohlen et al.
