= 1889 Liberian general election =

- 1889
- Presidential election
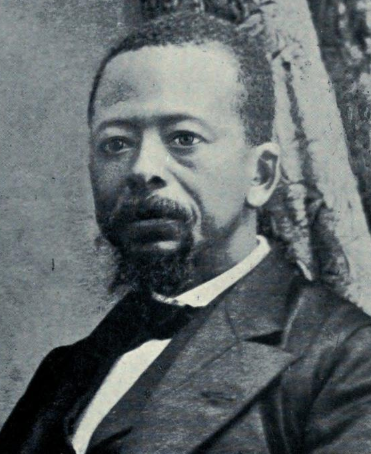
Nominee	Hilary R. W. Johnson
Party	TWP
President before election
Hilary R. W. Johnson
True Whig Party
Elected President
Hilary R. W. Johnson
True Whig Party

General elections were held in Liberia in 1889. Incumbent president Hilary R. W. Johnson of the True Whig Party was the only candidate in the presidential elections, and was re-elected unopposed for a fourth term.
