= 1967 Liberian general election =

- 2 May 1967
- Presidential election
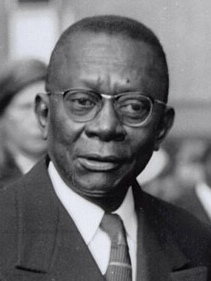
Nominee	William Tubman
Party	TWP
Running mate	William Tolbert
Popular vote	566,684
Percentage	100%
President before election
William Tubman
TWP
Elected President
William Tubman
TWP

General elections were held in Liberia on 2 May 1967. In the presidential election, incumbent William Tubman of the True Whig Party was the only candidate, and was re-elected unopposed.

== Results ==
=== President ===
Candidate	Party	Votes	%
William Tubman	True Whig Party	566,684	100.00
Total		566,684	100.00
Source: African Elections Database
