= Charles D. B. King =

President of Liberia from 1920 to 1930

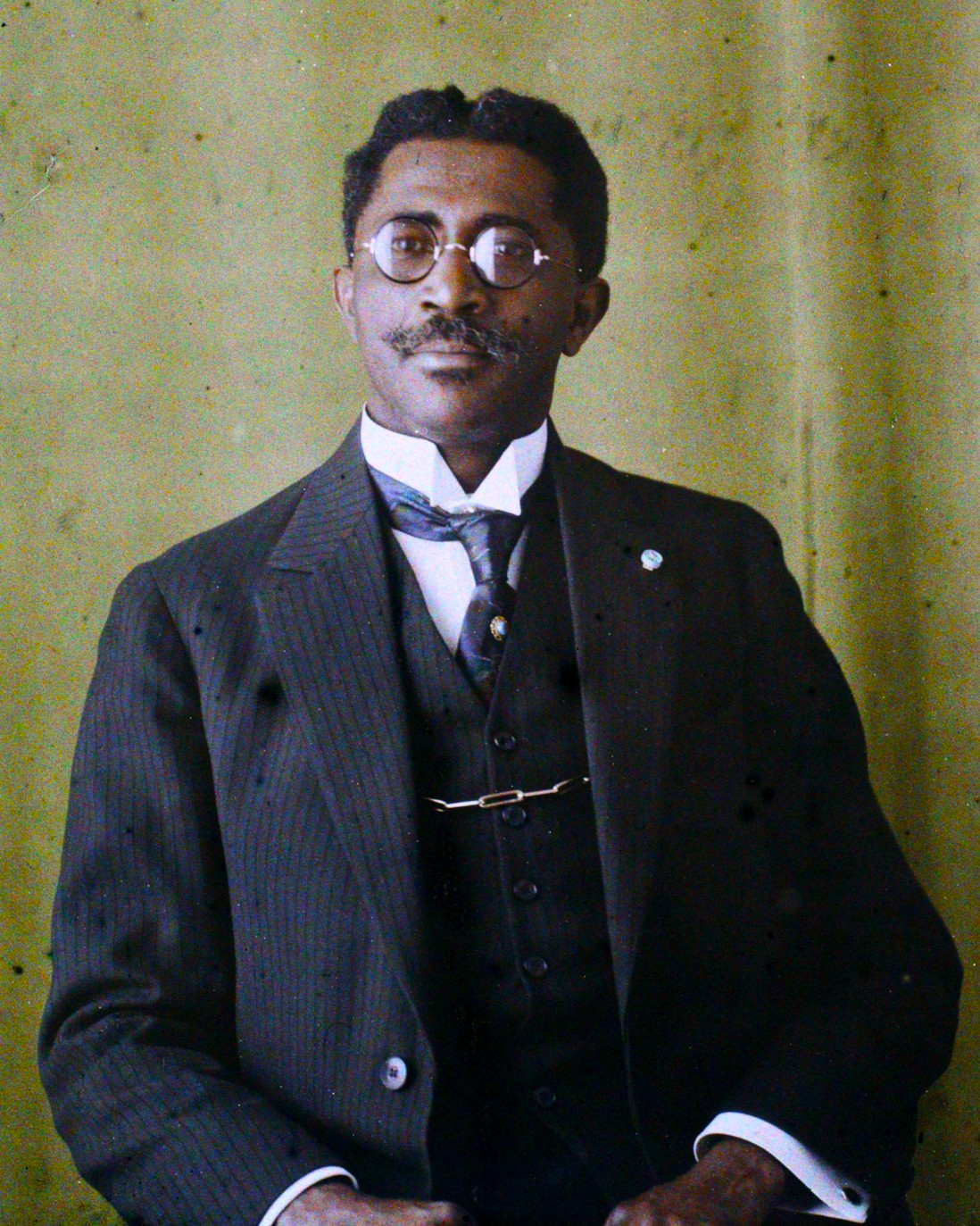
- 1927 Autochrome by Auguste Léon

17th President of Liberia
- In office 5 January 1920 – 3 December 1930
- Vice President: Samuel Alfred Ross (1920–1924); Henry Too Wesley (1924–1928); Allen Yancy (1928–1930)
- Preceded by: Daniel E. Howard
- Succeeded by: Edwin Barclay

Personal details
- Born: 12 March 1875 Monrovia, Liberia
- Died: 4 September 1961 (aged 86) Monrovia, Liberia
- Party: True Whig
- Relations: Olubanke King Akerele (granddaughter)
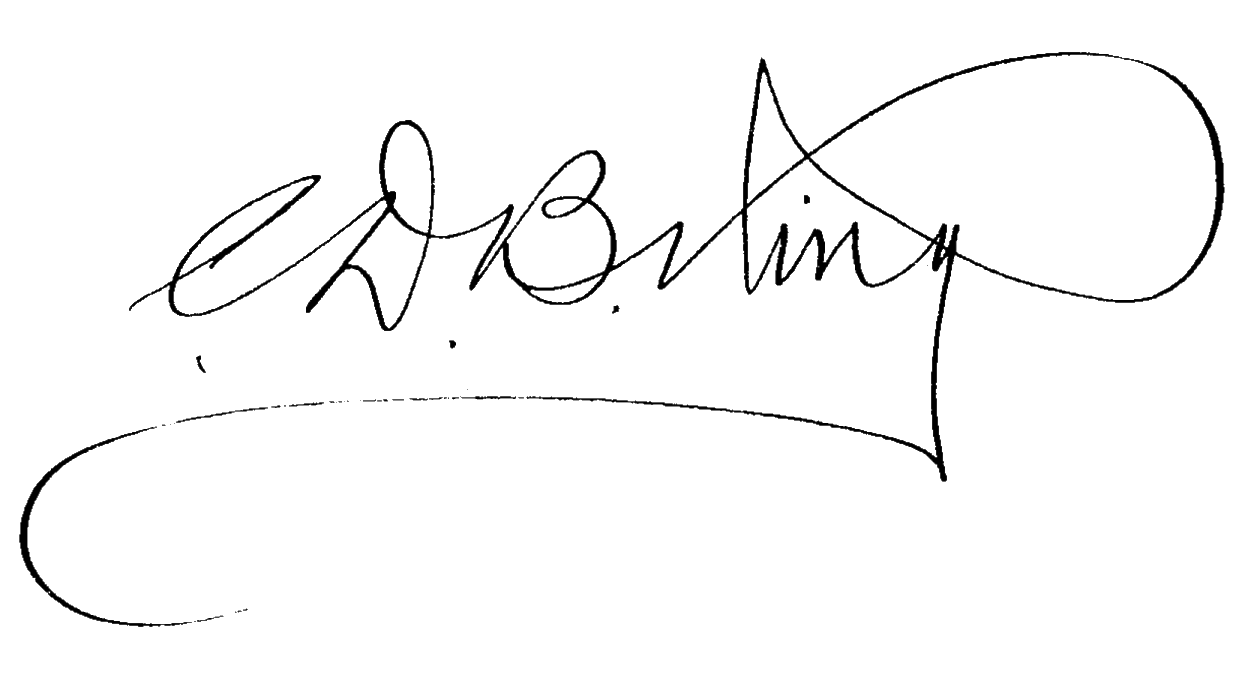
- Signature

Charles Dunbar Burgess King (12 March 1875 – 4 September 1961) was a Liberian politician who served as the 17th president of Liberia from 1920 to 1930. He was of Americo-Liberian and Sierra Leone Creole descent. He was a member of the True Whig Party, which ruled the country from 1878 until 1980.

King was Attorney General from 1904 until 1912, and Secretary of State of Liberia from 1912 until he was elected president in 1919. In this capacity, he attended the 1919 Paris Peace Conference and the accompanying First Pan-African Congress. Though a moderate supporter of reform, he continued to support the patronage machine and corrupt dominance of the True Whig Party.

President King's administration was marked by scandal. His economic agenda and development plan consistently fell short of expectations; and while literacy rates increased with broader access to public education, his presidency is best known for a string of political scandals and economic setbacks.

In 1927, he won a sham presidential election, similar to the one he had won four years earlier, with official results showing over 15 times more votes for him than there were electors. A forced labor and slavery scandal forced his resignation in 1930. Charles King resigned in disgrace and retired from seeking higher office thereafter until his death. His presidency was marked by extreme corruption, nepotism for the hiring of officials rather than by skill, and a lack of transparency regarding the decisions his administration was making regarding the welfare of the people and use of slave labor.

== Presidency ==
King became Liberia's president in 1920 and served for ten years. As president, he helped establish the Booker Washington Institute in Kakata in 1929, and although King was considered a moderate reformer within the True Whig Party, his administration was mired in corruption and controversy, serving the party's patronage machine and making appointments based on nepotism and political favors.

=== Attempted negotiation of a loan from the United States ===
By the early 1920s, Liberia's financial crisis had worsened to the point that King was forced to head a commission that traveled to the United States to seek reorganization of the country's staggering debt burden. They arrived on March 6, 1921, shortly after U.S. President Warren G. Harding had taken office. The United States Congress had suspended all foreign credit and extension of foreign loans, even though the United States Department of State favored approving the request from the Liberian delegation. In July, United States Secretary of State Charles Evans Hughes said that it was the moral duty of the US to extend the requested loan to Liberia because of a 1918 agreement between the two countries. The following month, President Harding told Congress that he agreed with Secretary Hughes. Negotiations dragged on until October, until the State Department finally granted Liberia a loan for $5 million (equivalent to $90,000,000 in 2025). The House of Representatives approved the loan by a vote of 148–139, but the Senate voted 42–32 against it. This created great disappointment and a sense of desperation among Liberian officials, who worried that British and French designs on their country might now prove unstoppable. Liberia had become a charter member of the League of Nations in 1919, and the Liberian government was determined to safeguard its sovereignty.

=== Firestone Rubber Company ===
In 1925, Firestone Rubber Company agreed with King's government to a 99-year lease of 1,000,000 acres (4,000 km^{2}) of land in Liberia in order to grow rubber on it. Firestone began exporting rubber from Liberia in 1934, on which the Liberian economy soon came to depend. Firestone's subsidiary, called the Finance Corporation of America, also gave a $5 million loan to the Liberian government, which the latter intended to use to consolidate bond debts and fund public improvements. Under the terms of the loan, the president of the United States appointed a financial advisor to Liberia who had the power to approve and disapprove all expenditures by the Liberian government. The Liberian government was also required to use $2.5 million of the loan to purchase bonds at a ten percent markup and over $1.1 million toward loan repayments on a 1912 loan from the U.S. As a result, very little of the proceeds of the 1934 loan were available to help the country, and the loan repayments constituted 40 percent of the Liberian government's annual income.

=== Presidential election of 1927 ===
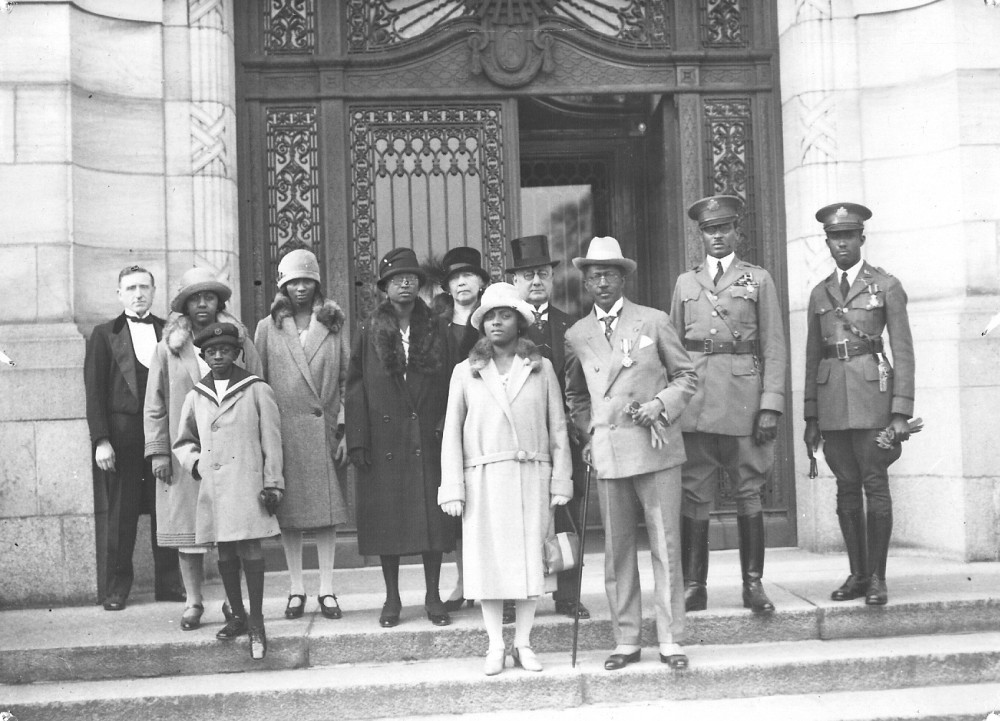
King, with his entourage on the steps of the Peace Palace, The Hague, in 1927.

King was challenged in the 1927 presidential election by Thomas J. R. Faulkner. According to the official statement, King received 234,000 votes; however, Liberia only had 15,000 registered voters at the time, making the reported number of votes more than 15 times the actual possible number. Thus, King was later listed in the Guinness Book of World Records as having won the most fraudulent reported election in history.

=== Forced labor and slavery scandal ===
After losing the 1927 presidential election to King, Faulkner accused many members of the government of recruiting and selling contract labor as slaves. Despite Liberia's denials and a refusal to cooperate, the League of Nations established a commission under the leadership of British zoologist Cuthbert Christy to determine the extent of forced labor and slavery still practiced by Liberia. U.S. President Herbert Hoover briefly suspended relations to press Liberia into compliance.

In 1930, the League of Nations published the committee's report, dubbed the 'Christy Report'. The report supported many of Faulkner's allegations and implicated many government officials, including Vice President Allen Yancy. It found that Yancy and other Liberian government officials had approved forced labor for the construction of certain public works such as roads, shipment of goods abroad, and to humiliate native chiefs, with certain tribes practicing domestic servitude that could be considered slavery. It also found that a "policy of gross intimidation and suppression ha[d] for years been systematically fostered and encouraged" in order to "suppress the native".

Subsequently, King and Vice President Yancy, along with other implicated leaders, resigned.

== Post-presidency ==
King served as resident minister to the United States from 24 to 25 July 1947, when the legation was raised to embassy. King continued to serve as ambassador until 1952.

== Personal life ==
King was first married to Janie E. Scott, and the couple had a son and two daughters. His second wife was Cecelia Adeline Cooper and they had one son together. In 1919, King and his wife were guests of President Woodrow Wilson in the United States.

He is the grandfather of Olubanke King Akerele.

== See also ==
- History of Liberia
- 1927 Liberian general election

Political offices
Preceded by F. E. R. Johnson	Secretary of State; 1912–1920	Succeeded by Edwin Barclay
Preceded by Daniel E. Howard	President of Liberia; 1920–1930	Succeeded by Edwin Barclay
Preceded by Position established	Permanent Representative of Liberia to the United Nations; 1949–1951	Succeeded by Richard L. L. Bright
