= Daniel Edward Howard =

President of Liberia from 1912 to 1920 (1861-1935)

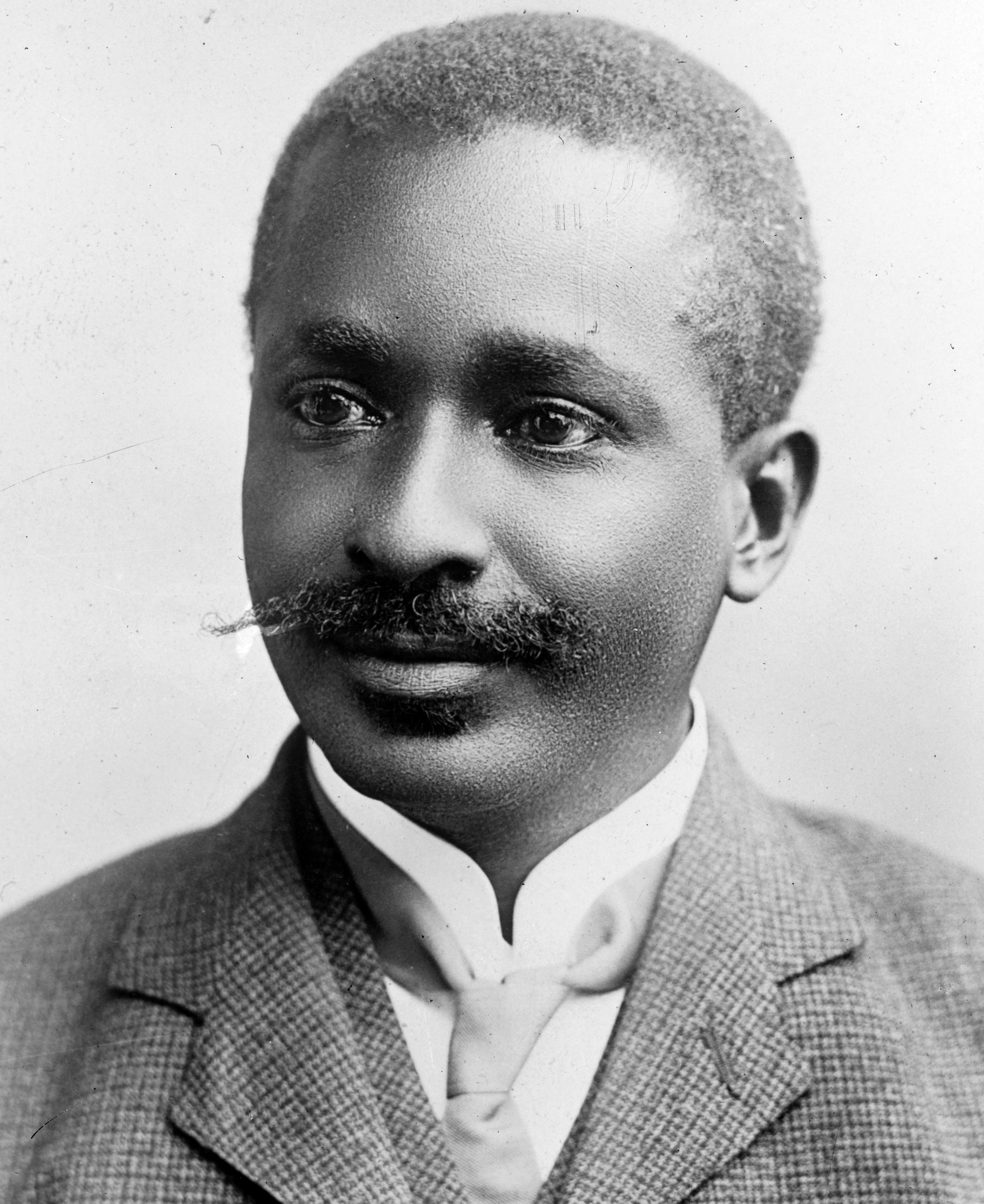

16th President of Liberia
- In office 1 January 1912 – 5 January 1920
- Vice President: Samuel George Harmon
- Preceded by: Arthur Barclay
- Succeeded by: Charles D.B. King

Personal details
- Born: 4 August 1861 Buchanan, Liberia
- Died: 9 July 1935 (aged 73) Monrovia, Liberia
- Party: True Whig

Daniel Edward Howard (4 August 1861 – 9 July 1935) was the 16th president of Liberia, serving from 1912 to 1920.

Howard was elected president in 1911 and assumed office on 1 January 1912. With the outbreak of World War I, he attempted to maintain the country's neutrality, though he tended to support the Allies, whose colonial territories in Africa surrounded Liberia. Despite German protests, he allowed the French to operate a Wireless station in the capital, Monrovia. Realizing that their complaints were in vain, the Germans sent a submarine to attack the city in 1917, forcing the reluctant Howard to side with the Allies and declare war on Germany.

Howard remained in office for two years after the war's end. He died in Monrovia in 1935.

== Before Presidency ==
Born in the town of Buchanan, Grand Bassa County, Daniel Edward Howard was the son of Thomas Howard, chairman of the National True Whig Party and Treasurer of Liberia. He was educated at Liberia College.

He worked his way up through the civil service to become secretary of the True Whig Party, the country's only political party at the time. Howard was the Secretary of the Treasury before becoming the president.

== Presidency (1912–1920) ==
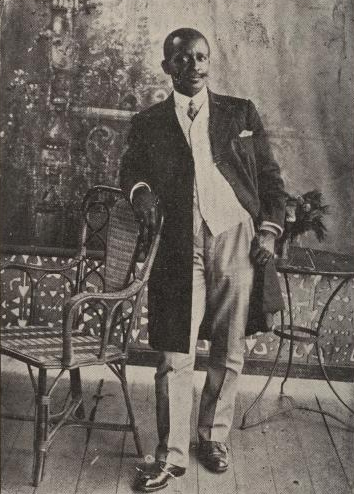
President Daniel Edward Howard

Daniel Edward Howard was the President of Liberia from 1912 to 1920. The finances of Liberia were so shaky that the pay of government employees was often suspended for months at a time.

=== Rebellion of indigenous ===
In 1915, the coastal Kru people, who had long resisted Monrovia's authority, rose in rebellion, declaring their loyalty to Great Britain and demanding annexation by the Sierra Leone Colony and Protectorate. In response, the United States diverted the USS Chester to Africa en route home from Ottoman Turkey to help quash the uprising.

=== World War I ===
At the outbreak of World War I, President Howard attempted to maintain the country's neutrality. However, he tended to support the Allies, whose colonial territories in Africa surrounded Liberia and whose naval superiority quickly disrupted trade with Germany. As Germany was Liberia's major trading partner, the loss of customs revenue severely impacted government finances. What little revenue remained was diminished by the blockade imposed by German submarines which effectively halted trade between Liberia and the Allies as well. Since Liberia's economy was almost completely dependent on export revenues, this sudden evaporation of customs revenues forced Liberia to postpone payment on the $1.7 million loan, and led President Daniel E. Howard to seek a $5 million loan from the Woodrow Wilson Administration. However, the United States Congress refused to approve the loan.

Despite German protests, Howard allowed the French to operate a Wireless station in the capital, Monrovia. Realizing that their complaints were in vain, the Germans sent a submarine to attack the city in 1917, forcing the reluctant Howard to side with the Allies and declare war on Germany on 12 January 1918. In April, the German bombing of Monrovia caused destruction to the city and the navy.

Liberia then liquidated the property of German nationals in Liberia. The money generated from this liquidation was deposited into the Liberian government bank account to compensate for loss of revenue from the blockade. The war ended in 1918, and Liberia's legislature ratified the Treaty of Versailles.

=== Territorial conflicts ===
In 1919, Liberia became a charter member of the League of Nations.

Conflicts over territorial claims again resulted in the loss of land to Britain and/or France in 1919. Whenever the British and French seemed intent on enlarging at Liberia's expense the neighboring territories they already controlled, periodic appearances by U.S. warships helped discourage encroachment, even though successive American administrations rejected appeals from Monrovia for more forceful support.

== See also ==
- History of Liberia

Political offices
Preceded by Arthur Barclay	President of Liberia; 1912–1920	Succeeded by Charles D.B. King
