= William D. Coleman (politician) =

Former President of Liberia

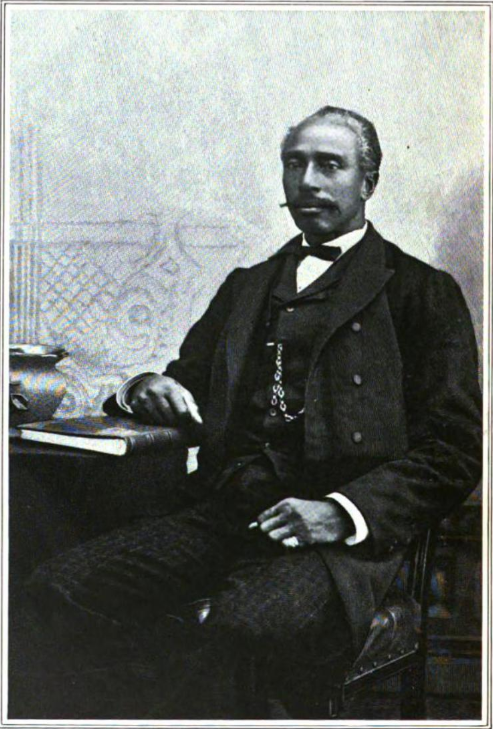
- Coleman in 1897

13th President of Liberia
- In office November 12, 1896 – December 11, 1900
- Vice President: Vacant (1896–1898); Joseph J. Ross (1898–1899); Vacant (1899–1900)
- Preceded by: Joseph James Cheeseman
- Succeeded by: Garretson W. Gibson

13th Vice President of Liberia
- In office January 4, 1892 – November 12, 1896
- President: Joseph James Cheeseman
- Preceded by: James Thompson
- Succeeded by: Joseph J. Ross

Personal details
- Born: July 18, 1842 Fayette County, Kentucky, United States
- Died: July 12, 1908 (aged 65) Clay-Ashland, Liberia
- Party: True Whig
- Spouse: Ophelia Coleman (m. 1896; died 1898)

William David Coleman (July 18, 1842 – July 12, 1908) was an Americo-Liberian politician. A True Whig Party member, he served as the 13th president of Liberia from 1896 to 1900. Born in Fayette County, Kentucky, United States, he emigrated to Liberia in 1853. In 1877, he was elected to the House of Representatives and served as Speaker of the House of Representatives until 1879. Later he served in the Senate and then as vice president before assuming the presidency when Joseph James Cheeseman died in office.

== Early life ==
Of mixed-race background, Coleman was born a slave in Fayette County, Kentucky, in 1842. He emigrated to Liberia with his family when he was 11 years old. Upon their arrival, the family consisted of William, his widowed mother Ellen, and three others, all of whom settled in Clay-Ashland near Monrovia. Coleman trained as a carpenter and had other manual labor jobs before becoming a successful trader. Studying at night, he picked up the education he had abandoned as a child when poverty had prevented further schooling.

== Political career ==
In 1877, he was elected to the House of Representatives to represent Montserrado County and became the Speaker of the House. Two years later Coleman was elected as a senator for the same county. He remained in the Senate until he was elected vice president alongside Joseph James Cheeseman on the True Whig ticket in 1892. They were re-elected twice to the two-year presidential terms. Upon Cheeseman's death in 1896, Coleman ascended to the presidency, serving out Cheeseman's second term and winning two terms of his own.

== Personal life ==
In 1896, Coleman married Ophelia Coleman, a native of Arkansas, United States, who emigrated to Liberia in 1895. On June 24, 1898, Ophelia died in the Executive Mansion in Monrovia.

== Presidency (1896–1900) ==
In 1896, Coleman's predecessor, Joseph Cheeseman, became the first president in Liberian history to die in office. He was re-elected in 1899 and his victory was hailed by the Philadelphia Inquirer in the United States as marking the opening of foreign investment in the country. William Coleman centered his policies on three cornerstones: education, finances, and interior policy. As part of this policy, he worked with his friend, Dr. Edward Wilmot Blyden, to re-open Liberia College in Monrovia. Other decisions included increasing the national government's power over the interior sections of the country, reorganizing the customs service, and attempting to further advance resource extraction. Coleman was successful in establishing control over the interior region north and west of the Saint Paul River.

=== Opposition, resignation ===
As his second term progressed, he faced increasing opposition from the citizenry for his execution of policies concerning the interior and the native tribes. After a falling out with political allies and his own cabinet over his policies placed more pressure on his administration, he resigned from office in December 1900. Coleman's successor was his secretary of state, Garretson W. Gibson, since the vice president had already died in office. Under existing succession laws, Speaker of the House Robert H. Marshall should have become president, but some felt that he was unsuited for the position. As a result, the legislature repealed the 1873 succession law and appointed Gibson as president.

== Later years ==
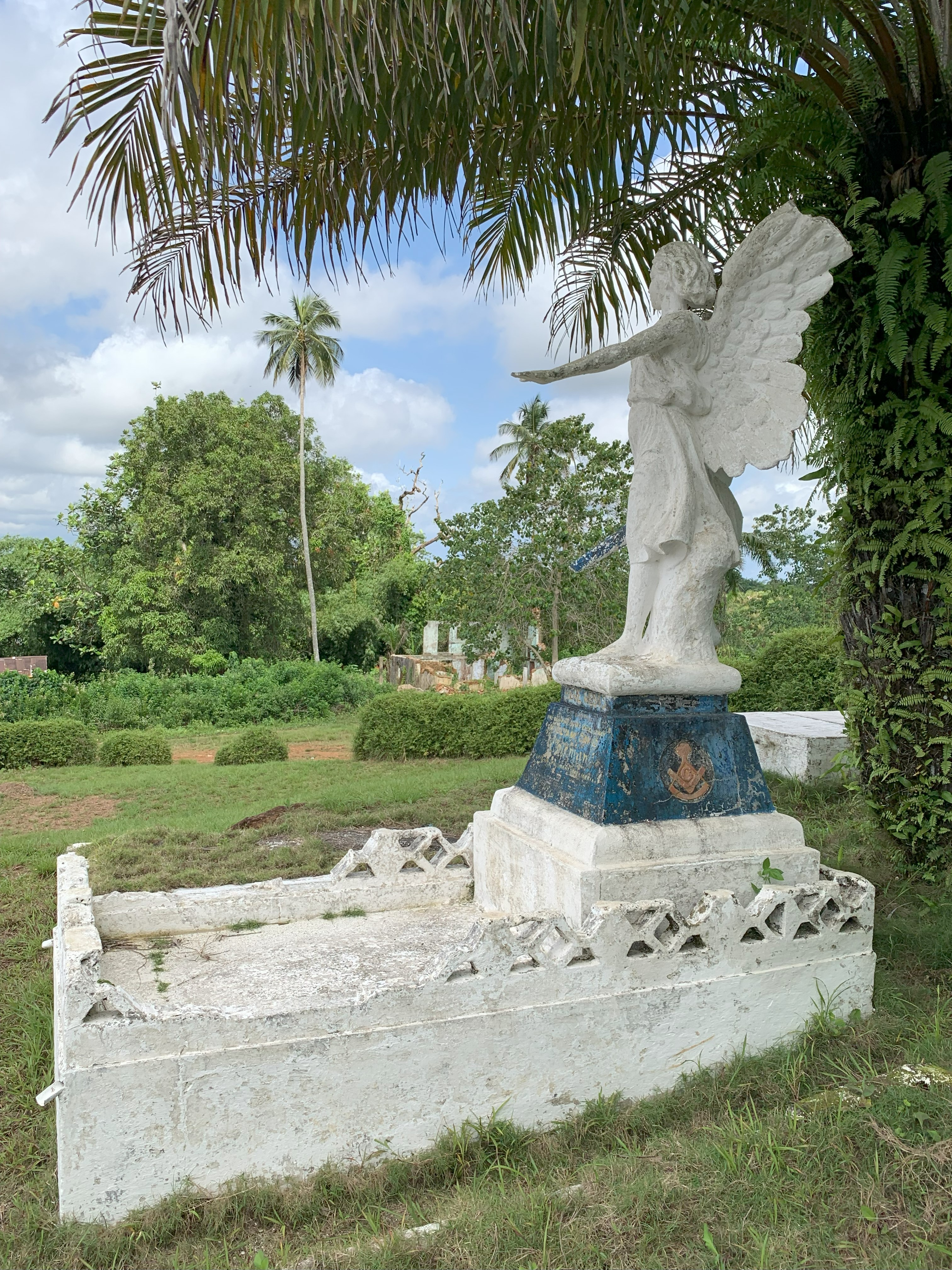
President Coleman's grave next to Grace Episcopal Church.

After resigning the presidency, Coleman continued to be an active player in Liberian politics. He ran for president three more times (1901, 1903, and 1905) as a member of the People's Party, losing each election. He died in 1908 in Clay-Ashland at the age of 65. His son Samuel David Coleman was also involved in politics and was killed by government forces on June 27, 1955, after accusations of a failed coup.

== Legacy ==
- The William D. Coleman High School in Clay-Ashland, Liberia was built in his memory.
- William D. Coleman is survived by numerous descendants in Liberia and the Liberian diaspora (the Richards & Coleman Family). Notable members of the family include his descendants, NBA player Noah Vonleh and NFL player Tevin Coleman.

== See also ==
- History of Liberia

Political offices
Preceded by James Thompson	Vice President of Liberia; 1892 – 1896	Succeeded by Joseph J. Ross
Preceded by Joseph James Cheeseman	President of Liberia; 1896 – 1900	Succeeded by Garretson W. Gibson
