= Arthur Barclay =

President of Liberia from 1904 to 1912

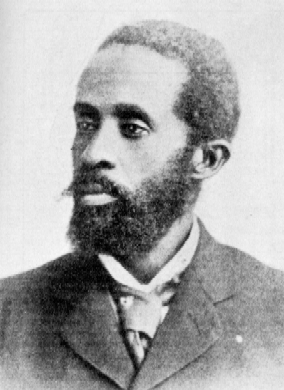

15th President of Liberia
- In office 4 January 1904 – 1 January 1912
- Vice President: Joseph D. Summerville (1904–1905); Vacant (1905–1906); J. J. Dossen (1906–1912)
- Preceded by: Garretson W. Gibson
- Succeeded by: Daniel Edward Howard

Personal details
- Born: 31 July 1854 Bridgetown, Barbados
- Died: 10 July 1938 (aged 83) Monrovia, Liberia
- Party: True Whig

Arthur Barclay (31 July 1854 – 10 July 1938) was the 15th president of Liberia from 1904 to 1912.

== Early life and education ==
Barclay was born at Bridgetown, Barbados, on 31 July 1854, the tenth of twelve children of Anthony and Sarah Barclay. He was the father of Anthony Barclay, who served on the Supreme Court of Liberia, and uncle of the 18th president, Edwin Barclay.

Barclay immigrated to Liberia with his father in 1865. His first teacher was his oldest sister, Antoinette Barclay. He later entered the Preparatory Department of Liberia College, under the principalship of Anthony T. Ferguson. Having completed the course prescribed, he matriculated into the Collegiate Department and graduated as a Bachelor of Arts in the Class of 1873.

== Career ==
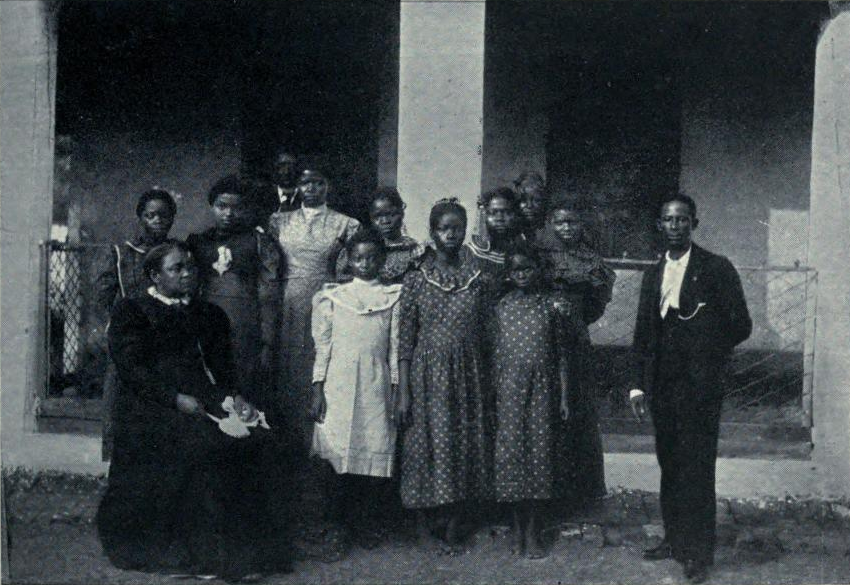
Mrs. Barclay, wife of President Arthur Barclay, and the pupils of a girls' school.

In 1877, he was appointed principal of the Preparatory Department of his alma mater, which position he held for a number of years, and served during the vacation as chief clerk of the House of Representatives. His later services to the said institution were: professor, member of the board of trustees, and sometimes acting president.

He was called to the bar of Montserrado County in 1877, and after practicing law for three years, he attained the rank of counsellor of the Supreme Court.

His first official position was private secretary to President Joseph Jenkins Roberts in 1874. His second position was judge of the Court of Quarter Sessions and Common Pleas of Montserrado County to which he was appointed by President Alfred F. Russell in 1883.

In 1885, President Hilary R. W. Johnson appointed him sub-treasurer of Montserrado County, which he held for 5 years.

He was mayor of Monrovia from 1892 to 1902.

In 1892, President Joseph James Cheeseman elevated him to the cabinet position as postmaster-general and then to secretary of state. Upon the death of his predecessor H. A. Williams in 1896, he was appointed secretary of the treasury, which he held until his election to the presidency in May 1903. Inaugurated in January 1904, he served until January 1912. After his retirement he served as president of Liberia College from 1914 to 1917.

He served upon the following diplomatic commissions:

- In 1893, associated with Senator A. B. King, and William Rothery, he was sent as a commissioner to the World's Fair at Chicago, Illinois, United States.
- In 1897, associated with Attorney General Stevens, he went to London, England, to arrange with the Council of Foreign Bondholders for the amortization of the loan of 1870, contracted in the administration of President Edward James Roye, which had been in default for over 20 years.
- In 1901, he was associated with Chief Justice Z. B. Roberts and Senator A. B. King on diplomatic missions to England and France.

== Presidency (1904–1912) ==
Arthur Barclay was president from 1904 to 1912. In addition to continued internal unrest, the country faced a severe economic crisis and huge indebtedness to European creditors. In the decades after 1868, escalating economic difficulties weakened the state's dominance over the coastal indigenous population. Conditions worsened, as the cost of imports was far greater than the income generated by exports of coffee, rice, palm oil, sugarcane, and timber. Liberia tried desperately to modernize its largely agricultural economy.

In 1907, while president of the nation, he headed the mission to arrange boundary disputes with the British and French Governments, associating with F. E. R. Johnson, secretary of state, and T. McCants Stewart, Deputy Attorney-General of Liberia.

George Washington Ellis wrote of Barclay in 1911,

He brought with his elevation to the presidency a deep thinker, a wide public experience and equipment, a gentleman of modest and retiring manners, a faithful public servant and a brave champion of public measures. He surrounded himself with the ablest men of his country and his administrations will be remembered for many notable civic triumphs in behalf of the Liberian state: the definition of Liberian boundaries, the pacification of the interior, increased control of the native races, organization of the Liberian Frontier Police Force, better supervision of the Liberian customs, and repeated attempts at judicial and other domestic reforms.

Under his government, the Liberian Frontier Force was created, which later evolved into the Liberian Armed Forces.

== Death ==
He died at his home in Monrovia on 10 July 1938.

== See also ==
- History of Liberia

== Bibliography ==
- Nathaniel R. Richardson, Liberia's Past and Present. London: The Diplomatic Press and Publishing Company, 1959.

Preceded by Garretson W. Gibson	President of Liberia; 1904–1912	Succeeded by Daniel E. Howard
