= True Whig Party =

Political party in Liberia

True Whig Party Liberian Whig Party
- Abbreviation: TWP
- Leader: Reginald Goodridge
- Historic leaders: Edward James Roye; Anthony W. Gardner; William Tubman; William Tolbert; Clarence Lorenzo Simpson
- Founded: 1869 (first incarnation)
- Dissolved: April 1980 (first incarnation)
- Preceded by: Opposition Party
- Merged into: Coalition for the Transformation of Liberia
- Headquarters: Monrovia, Montserrado County, Liberia
- Ideology: 1869–1944: Whiggism; Centralization; Protectionism; 1944–1971: Black conservatism Economic liberalism Anti-communism; Primitivism (elements; for rhetoric); 1971–1980: Humanistic capitalism Protectionism; Economic interventionism
- Political position: Right-wing
- Colors: Green; Yellow
- Historical ethnic affiliation: Americo-Liberians
- Seats in the Senate: 0 / 30
- Seats in the House: 0 / 73

Party flag

The True Whig Party (TWP), also known as the Liberian Whig Party (LWP), is the oldest political party in Liberia, and in Africa as a whole. Founded in 1869 by primarily darker-skinned Americo-Liberians in rural areas, its historical rival was the Republican Party. Following the decline of the latter, it dominated Liberian politics from 1878 until 1980. The nation was effectively governed as a one-party state under the TWP, although opposition parties were never outlawed.

Initially, its ideology was strongly influenced by that of the United States Whig Party (from which it took its name). The elephant mascot was taken from the Republican Party, the successor of the Whigs. Much of the TWP's support came from the Americo-Liberian community who held an influential position over Liberian politics and society. The TWP's long term leader and President William Tubman was widely regarded as the father of modern Liberia.

The TWP fell out of power following the 1980 Liberian coup d'état in which many of its leading members died or fled, ending its dominant position. The TWP ceased to be officially recognized after the coup, although it was never disbanded and continued as a rump party. The party went on to participate in the unsuccessful Coalition for the Transformation of Liberia (COTOL) ahead of the 2005 general election before de-coalition and winning fewer votes at the 2017 elections. In 2020 it became part of the Rainbow Alliance (RA).

== History ==
The True Whig Party was founded in the township of Clay-Ashland in 1869 as a reorganised version of the Opposition Party. It presided over a society in which black American settlers and their descendants, known as Americo-Liberians, though a small minority of the population, constituted nearly 100% of the citizens able to vote. It primarily represented them, often working in tandem with the Masonic Order of Liberia.

The True Whig Party was initially formed as an alliance of "mostly dark-skinned upriver planters and the dark-skinned faction among the coastal merchants", as opposed to the lighter-skinned mulatto elite represented by the Republican Party. The party first came to power after Edward James Roye won the 1869 Liberian general election and was sworn in as president the following year. The Republican Party had tended to be supported by Americo-Liberians of mixed African and European ancestry while darker skinned Americo-Liberians initially rallied around the TWP, however as the Republican Party began to decline in influence most Americo-Liberians transferred their support to the TWP.

After Anthony W. Gardner was elected president in 1878, the TWP went on to govern Liberia for over a century. While opposition parties were never made illegal and Liberia was not classed as a dictatorship, the TWP more or less ran the country as a one party state and held a monopoly on Liberian politics.

The party was accused of endorsing systems of forced labor. In 1930 they sent "contract migrant laborers", under conditions tantamount to slavery, to Spanish colonists on Fernando Pó in Spanish Guinea (now Bioko in Equatorial Guinea). This led to an investigation by the League of Nations, a five-year U.S. and British boycott of Liberia followed by the resignation of President Charles D. B. King. Despite this dispute, the West generally considered the True Whig Party as a stabilizing, unthreatening force in the period thereafter. The US and Britain later invested extensively in the nation under William Tubman's long period of rule (1944–1971).

Under the leadership and Presidency of William Tubman, the TWP took a pro-American stance in international policy, encouraged foreign investment, promoted industrialization and embarked on a mass modernization program of Liberia's domestic infrastructure. This led to a period of economic prosperity during the 1960s, was credited with putting Liberia on the map and establishing the country as a modern power in Africa. Although opponents of Tubman's government accused it of being authoritarian, Liberia was widely regarded internationally as being a stable and successful nation in the region whilst other African states were undergoing civil wars and political strife.

Following Tubman's death in 1971, the TWP leadership and Presidency was taken over by William Tolbert. Tolbert diverted from the TWP's traditional policies in seeking to stress Liberian sovereignty and political independence by casting off dependence on foreign governments and international business. He initiated some socially liberal reforms, pledging stricter regulation of foreign businesses operating in Liberia, granting official recognition status to opposition parties and attempting to re-balance economic disparities between Americo-Liberians and native ethnic tribes. He also pursued open diplomatic and economic relationships with the Soviet Union and shifted Liberia's focus to other African nations as opposed to the West. However, some of these reforms were reversed following the Maryland County ritual killings and the Rice Riots in which Tolbert called for the arrest of opposition leaders. Opposition parties also accused Tolbert of using corruption and political nepotism to retain power while traditionalist members of the TWP. Some members of Tolbert's cabinet were angered by his effort to appoint native Liberians into government positions, which they saw as usurping their position.

The party lost power after Tolbert was killed in a military coup on 12 April 1980. The attack was orchestrated by a group of AFL soldiers led by Samuel Doe, who formed the People's Redemption Council (PRC). They opposed Tolbert's clampdown on the political opposition and what they saw as his tolerance of corruption. Many high-ranking officials of the TWP such as E. Reginald Townsend, Frank E. Tolbert (William's brother) and Cecil Dennis were executed whilst others fled the country, massively diminishing the country's executive leadership. The new government subsequently restricted activities of the TWP and lost its official status; the vast majority of its members and supporters left the party, but other TWP members vowed to continue and it struggled on as a minor rump party without official recognition. Members of indigenous groups began to exert more political power following the coup, in keeping with their dominance in number of the national population, further diminishing the TWP's support which had come from the formerly more influential but demographically smaller Americo-Liberian population. Doe's government realigned Liberia's foreign policy back to a pro-US position, making it harder to gain international recognition as an opposition group with fears over communist expansionism and the rise of Soviet backed client regimes in Africa during the Cold War. In 1985, all political opposition (including the TWP) were banned following a coup attempt against Doe.

== Legacy ==
In 1991, the party faced a challenge from a new group, which identified as the "National True Whig Party of Liberia". TWP chairman Momo Fahnbulleh Jones threatened legal action to induce the newly founded party to change its name.

The TWP was officially reconstituted in 2005 under the leadership of Peter Vuku.

The TWP participated in the 2005 general election as part of the Coalition for the Transformation of Liberia (COTOL). The COTOL coalition won eight seats but was dissolved the next year after some of its members left to join the ruling Unity Party (UP). The TWP registered to compete as an individual party for the House of Representatives in the 2011 general election, while endorsing President Ellen Johnson Sirleaf's bid for a second term at Presidential level. However, the party had strife over its leadership five months before the election, and it failed to nominate any candidate for any legislative seat and did not compete as a result.

In 2013, members of the TWP became embroiled in a dispute over Edward J. Roye Building in Monrovia which had been constructed as the party headquarters. The building had been appropriated by the Liberian General Services Agency which provoked anger among TWP members who stated they are still the rightful owners and that Chairman of the Council of State David D. Kpormakpor had decreed that it should be returned to the TWP's possession.

In 2015, the TWP appointed former government information minister Reginald Goodridge as its new chairman and was successfully registered to stand as an individual party for the 2017 election but ended up gaining 0.96% of the vote.

On August 31, 2020, a political alliance containing seven constituent parties, including the TWP, known as the Rainbow Alliance (RA) was certified by the National Elections Commission (NEC). Goodridge served as the interim chairman of the alliance. The RA unsuccessfully contested the 2020 Senate elections with 10 candidates. The RA held its first national convention on October 29, 2022, in Paynesville. Interim Chairman Goodridge was elected standard bearer. The RA did not run a candidate in the 2023 presidential election. The RA unsuccessfully ran candidates in various 2023 legislative elections.

By May 2025, the TWP executive committee passed a vote of no confidence against Chairman Goodridge. They accused Goodridge of not scheduling a national convention to elect new party officers, despite party's constitution requiring it. The party plans to hold a convention on October 30, 2025. As of May 2025, the TWP is allying with the ruling UP.

== Ideology ==
The True Whig Party initially sought to emulate the policies of the American Whig Party (from which it took its name) and the philosophy of Whiggism. The TWP was also described as promoting conservatism and black conservatism in the twentieth century during Tubman's rule.

Although the party favored protectionism in its early years, it later pursued deregulation, free-market and economically liberal policies known as the "porte ouverte" ("open door") under Tubman to attract investment and stimulate growth.

In terms of foreign policy, the TWP took a pro-Western and particularly pro-American stance owing to the fact much of the TWP's support and membership came from the Americo-Liberian population. Although Liberia did not declare war on Germany and Japan until 1944, the party supported the Allies against the Axis powers during the Second World War.

Under Tubman, the party was also anti-communist during the height of the Cold War. It later supported America's foreign policy during the Vietnam War and maintained friendly relations with the state of Israel. In November 1947, Liberia had been among African governments which voted Yes for the United Nations Partition Plan for Palestine, a vote which implied acceptance of the Zionist Movement's aspiration to create an independent sovereign nation (the State of Israel) as a Jewish-dominant state.

Under the leadership of William Tolbert (who sought to stress Liberia's political independence), the ruling TWP shifted away from a pro-Western stance to a neutral posture by fostering partnerships with other African states and opening up relationships with the Soviet Union, China and Eastern Bloc nations, pursuing liberal domestic policies and attempting to bring more native Liberians into governing circles.

These ideological changes caused consternation among both TWP supporters and politicians in Tolbert's administration.

== Electoral history ==
=== Presidential elections ===
Election	Party candidate	Votes	%	Result
1869	Edward James Roye			Elected ✓
1877	Anthony W. Gardner			Elected ✓
1879	Anthony W. Gardner			Elected ✓
1881	Anthony W. Gardner			Elected ✓
1883	Supported Hilary R. W. Johnson			Elected ✓
1885	Hilary R. W. Johnson	1,438	62.25%	Elected ✓
1887	Hilary R. W. Johnson			Elected ✓
1889	Hilary R. W. Johnson			Elected ✓
1891	Joseph James Cheeseman			Elected ✓
1893	Joseph James Cheeseman			Elected ✓
1895	Joseph James Cheeseman			Elected ✓
1897	William D. Coleman			Elected ✓
1899	William D. Coleman			Elected ✓
1901	Garreston W. Gibson			Elected ✓
1903	Arthur Barclay			Elected ✓
1905	Arthur Barclay			Elected ✓
1907	Arthur Barclay			Elected ✓
1911	Daniel Edward Howard			Elected ✓
1915	Daniel Edward Howard			Elected ✓
1919	Charles D. B. King			Elected ✓
1923	Charles D. B. King	45,000		Elected ✓
1927	Charles D. B. King	243,000	96.43%	Elected ✓
1931	Edwin Barclay			Elected ✓
1939	Edwin Barclay			Elected ✓
1943	William Tubman			Elected ✓
1951	William Tubman			Elected ✓
1955	William Tubman	244,873	99.5%	Elected ✓
1959	William Tubman	530,566	100%	Elected ✓
1963	William Tubman	565,044	100%	Elected ✓
1967	William Tubman	566,684	100%	Elected ✓
1971	William Tubman	714,005	100%	Elected ✓
1975	William Tolbert	750,000	100%	Elected ✓
2005	Supported Varney Sherman (COTOL)	76,403	7.8%	Lost ✗
2011	Supported Ellen Johnson Sirleaf (UP)	607,618	90.7%	Elected ✓

=== House of Representatives elections ===
Election	Votes	%	Seats	+/–	Position
1955	244,873	99.5%	29 / 29	New	▲1st
1959	No data				
1963	No data				
1967	No data				
1971	No data		52 / 52	▲23	1st
1975	750,000	100%	71 / 71	▲19	1st
1985	Did not contest		0 / 64	▼71	—N/a
1997	Did not contest		0 / 64	0	—N/a
2005	137,897	14.74% as part of COTOL	8 / 64	▲8	▼2nd
2011	Did not contest		0 / 73	▼8	—N/a
2017	14,723	0.96%	0 / 73	0	▼18th
2023	8,574	0.47% as part of RA	0 / 73	0	▼25th

=== Senate elections ===
Election	Votes	%	Seats	+/–	Position
1955	244,873	99.5%	10 / 10	New	▲1st
1959	No data				
1963	No data				
1967	No data				
1971	No data				
1975	750,000	100%	18 / 18	▲8	1st
1985	Did not contest		0 / 26	▼18	—N/a
1997	Did not contest		0 / 64	0	—N/a
2005	232,636	13.76% as part of COTOL	7 / 30	▲7	▼2nd
2011	Did not contest		0 / 30	▼7	—N/a
2014	Did not contest		0 / 30	0	—N/a
2020	9,577	1.09% as part of RA	0 / 30	0	▼6th
2023	6,552	0.36% as part of RA	0 / 30	0	▼14th

== See also ==
- History of Liberia
