= Joseph James Cheeseman =

President of Liberia (1843-1896)

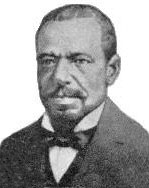

12th President of Liberia
- In office January 4, 1892 – November 12, 1896
- Vice President: William D. Coleman
- Preceded by: Hilary R. W. Johnson
- Succeeded by: William D. Coleman

Personal details
- Born: March 7, 1843 Edina, Liberia
- Died: November 12, 1896 (aged 53) Monrovia, Liberia
- Party: True Whig
- Education: Liberia College

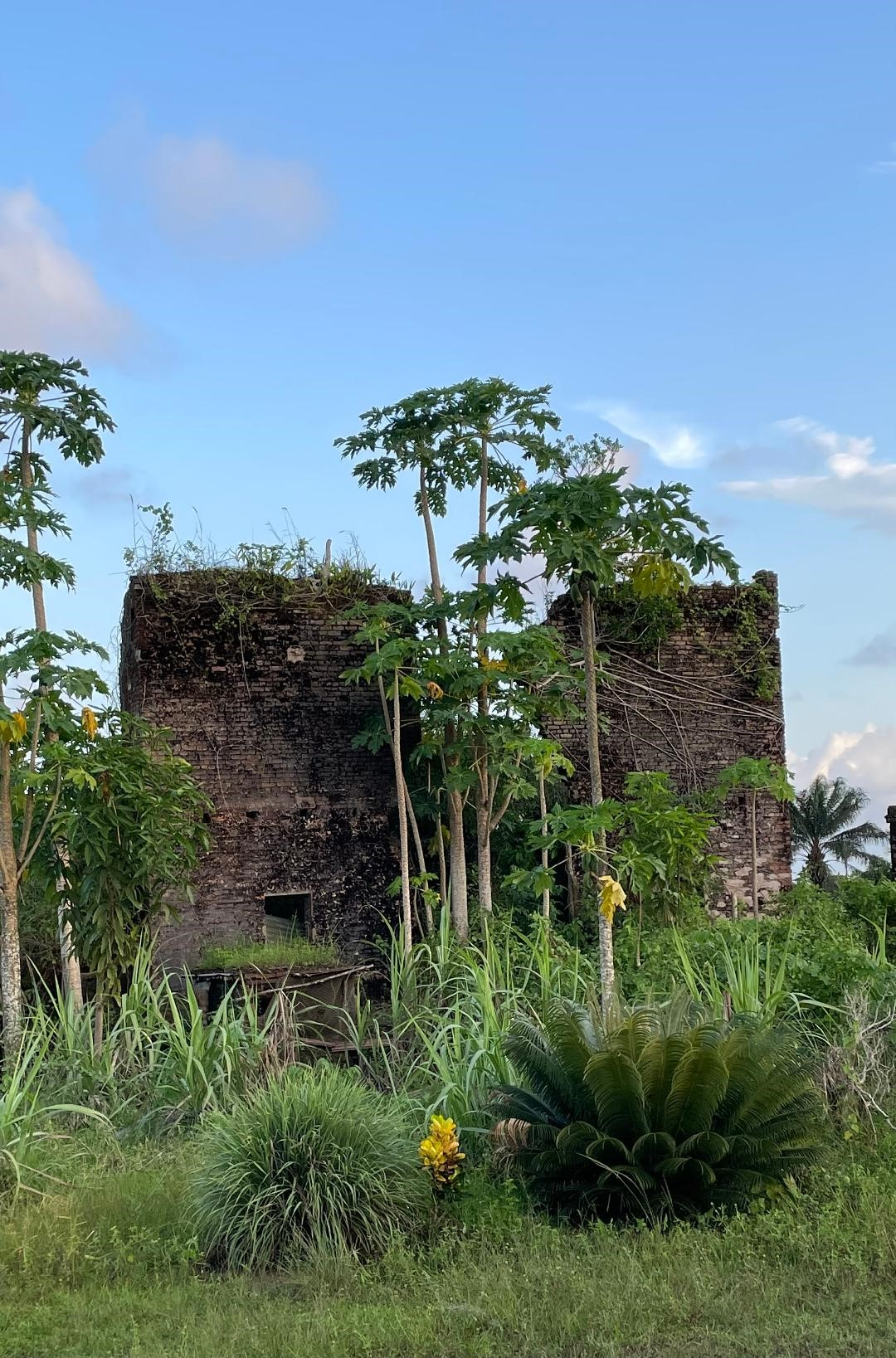
Ruins of the Cheeseman mansion in Edina.

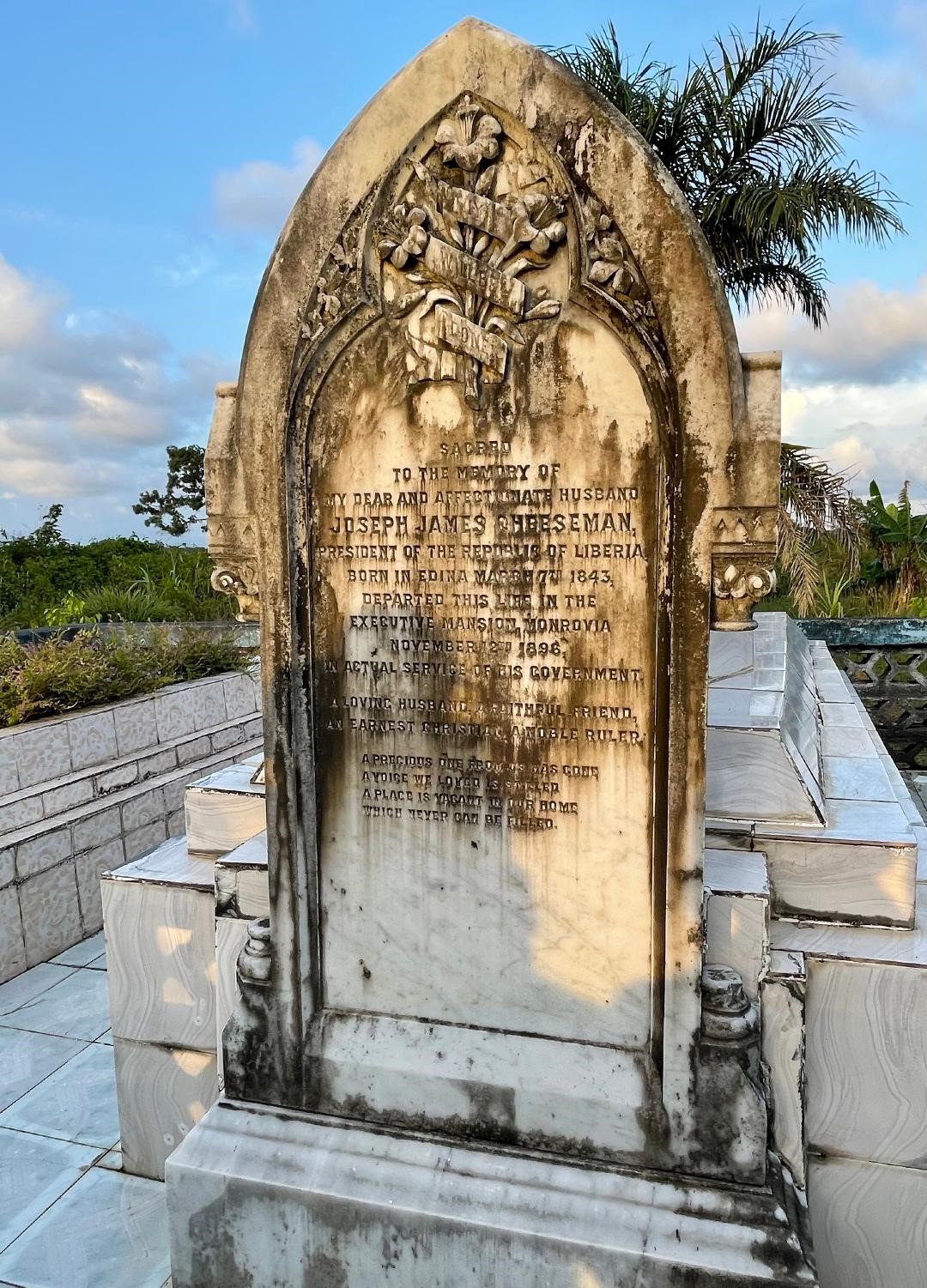
President Joseph Cheeseman's grave in Edina.

Joseph James Cheeseman (March 7, 1843 – November 12, 1896) was the 12th president of Liberia. Born at Edina in Grand Bassa County, he was elected three times on the True Whig ticket. Cheeseman was educated at Liberia College (now University of Liberia).

== Early life ==
Cheeseman was well educated and began his career as a teacher before coming into politics. He served in various government roles, including as a legislator before becoming president.

== Presidency (1892–1896) ==
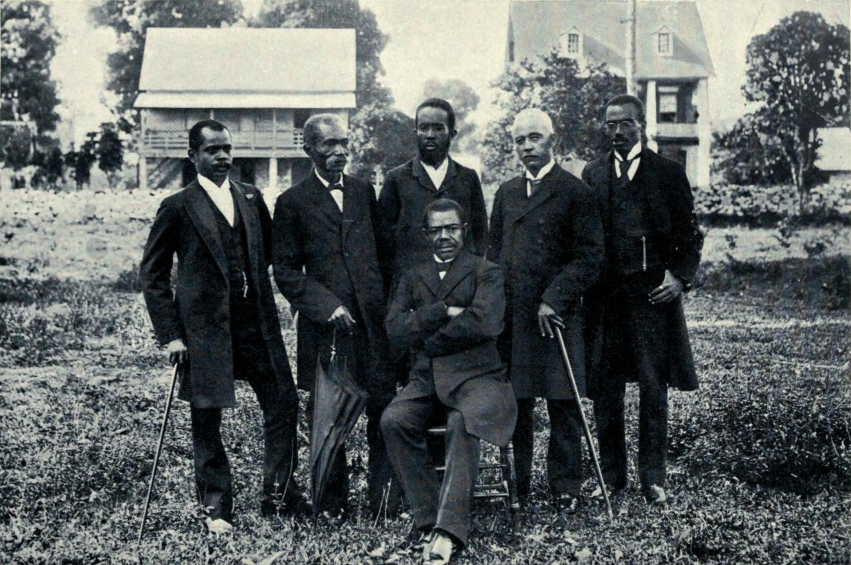
President Cheeseman and his cabinet

=== Economy ===
In the decades after 1868, escalating economic difficulties weakened the state's dominance over the coastal indigenous population. Conditions worsened, as the cost of imports was far greater than the income generated by exports of coffee, rice, palm oil, sugarcane, and timber. Liberia tried desperately to modernize its largely agricultural economy.

=== Territorial conflicts ===
In 1892, the French forced Liberia to cede to the Ivory Coast the area beyond Cape Palmas which Liberia had long controlled. President Johnson (1884–92) was responsible for this negotiation but retired before the treaty was signed. The boundaries of Liberia were beginning to be officially established from this year onwards. Whenever the British and French seemed intent on enlarging at Liberia's expense the neighboring territories they already controlled, periodic appearances by U.S. warships helped discourage encroachment, even though successive American administrations rejected appeals from Monrovia for more forceful support.

=== Ethnic uprisings ===
Some tribal people living in the hinterland of Montserrado County and further north were at war since the mid-1880s and would stay at war until the late 1890s. On the one hand there was a war between Gola and Mandingo over trading routes in the region, while various factions of the Gola were fighting with each other too.

Ethnic struggles with the Kru, Gola, and Grebo tribe who resented incursions into their territory occurred several times during Cheeseman's reign. Cheeseman initially attempted to settle tribal conflicts by peaceful negotiations. One notable uprising occurred in 1893 when the Grebo tribe attacked the settlement of Harper. Troops and the gunboat Gorronomah were sent to defeat the tribesmen.

=== Death ===
President Cheeseman died in office on November 12, 1896, and vice president William David Coleman served the remainder of the term and well as another four years until 1900. Cheeseman and his wife are buried in Edina in elaborate graves adjacent to their mansion, which is now in ruins and overgrown with vegetation.

== See also ==
- History of Liberia

| Preceded by Hilary R. W. Johnson | President of Liberia; 1892 – 1896 | Succeeded by William D. Coleman |
