= Edwin Barclay =

President of Liberia from 1930 to 1944

Edwin James Barclay
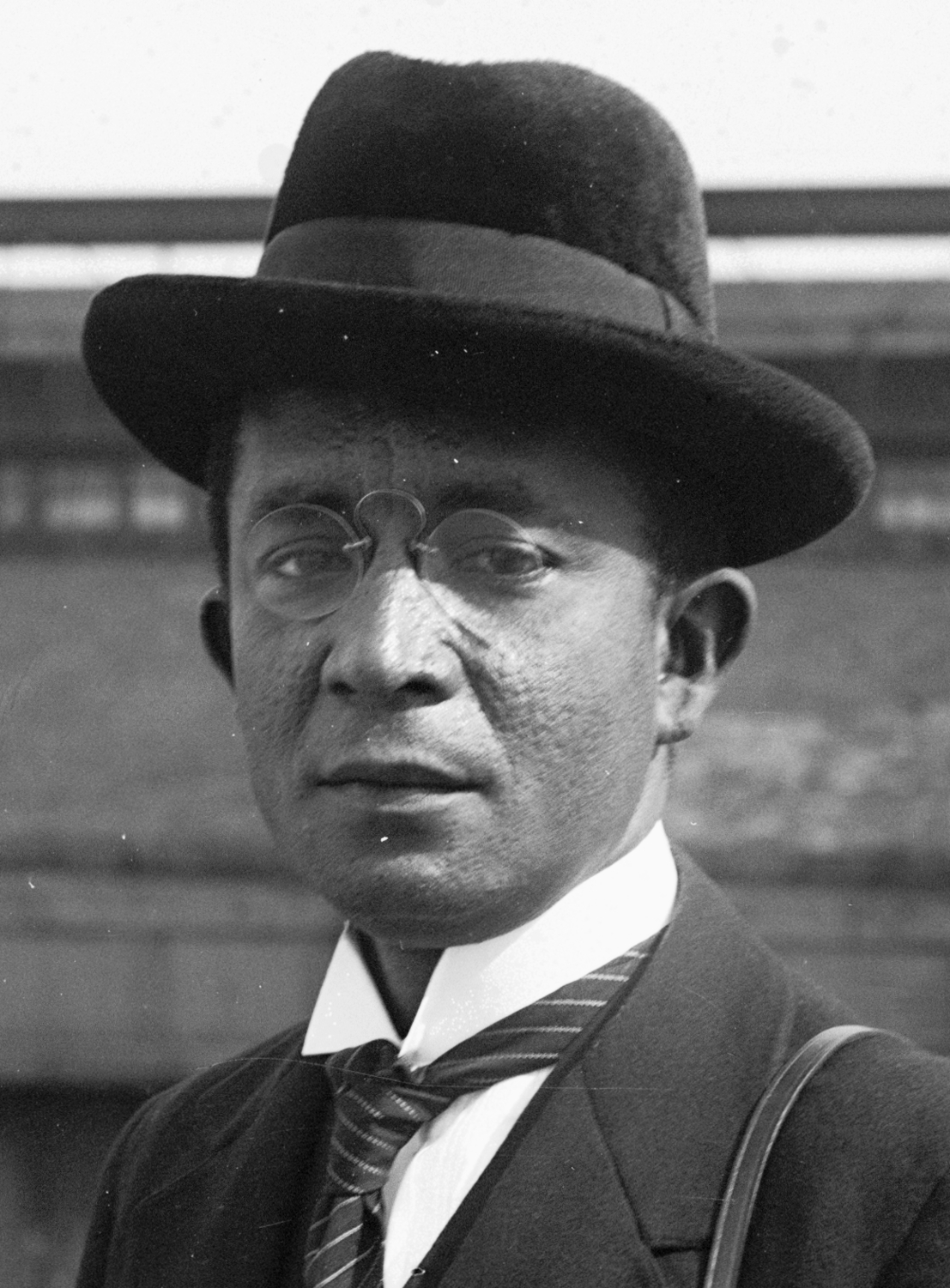

18th President of Liberia
- In office 3 December 1930 – 3 January 1944
- Vice President: James Skivring Smith Jr.
- Preceded by: Charles D. B. King
- Succeeded by: William V. S. Tubman

19th Secretary of State
- In office 5 January 1920 – 3 December 1930
- President: Charles D. B. King
- Preceded by: Charles D. B. King
- Succeeded by: Louis Arthur Grimes

Personal details
- Born: 5 January 1882 Liberia
- Died: 6 November 1955 (aged 73) Liberia
- Party: True Whig
- Spouse: Euphemia Barclay
- Children: 3

Edwin James Barclay (5 January 1882 – 6 November 1955) was a Liberian politician, poet, and musician who served as the 18th president of Liberia from 1930 until 1944. He was a member of the True Whig political party, which dominated the political governance of the country for decades. Under Barclay's leadership, Liberia was an ally of the United States during World War II.

== Early life ==
Edwin Barclay's paternal grandparents moved from Barbados to Liberia with their children in 1865. They were among a minority of immigrants from the Caribbean but shared with the Americo-Liberians a culture with an English base, considerable mixed-race ancestry, and a shared history. Edwin's father, Ernest Barclay, and uncle, Arthur Barclay, became important politicians in Liberia.

In 1901, at the age of 19, Edwin wrote a Liberian patriotic song, "The Lone Star Forever". Barclay and his wife Euphemia had three children: Mary Barclay Dumbar, Siata Isabel Barclay, and Earnest Barclay. In addition, they fostered future Liberian Ambassador to the U.S., George Arthur Padmore (1915–2005).

== Career ==
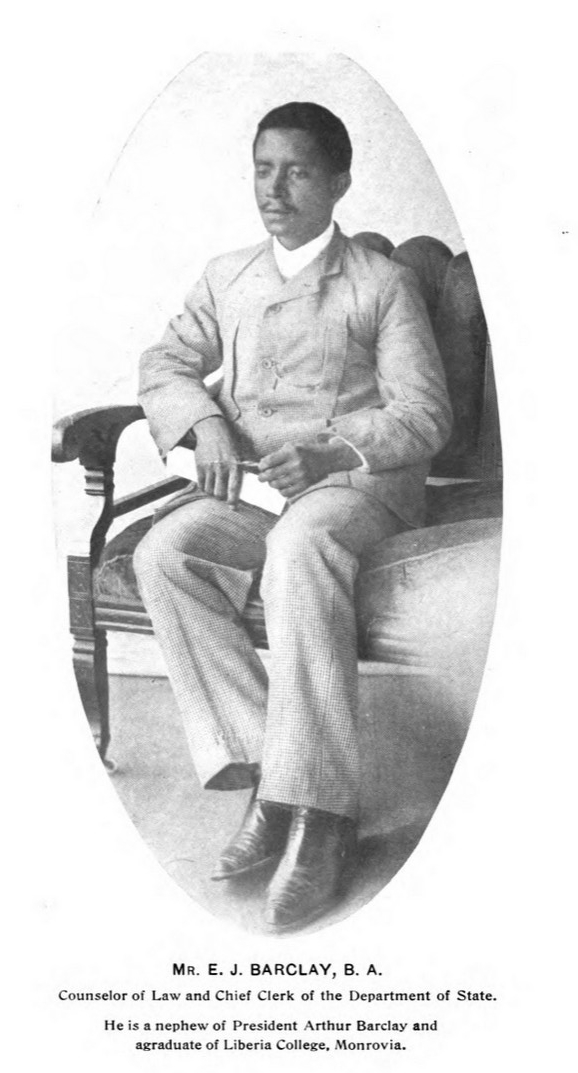
Barclay as chief clerk of the Department of State

Edwin Barclay, a member of the True Whig Party which ruled at that time, served as secretary of state of Liberia in the government of Charles D. B. King from 1920 until 1930. He became President of Liberia in 1930 when President King and Vice President Allen Yancy resigned after being implicated by a League of Nations investigation as having profited from forced labor. He was elected in his own right for the first time in 1931.

== Presidency (1930–44) ==
Barclay was selected to complete King's term as president. One of his first official decisions was to repeal the famous Port of Entry Law of 1864 that had restricted the economic activities of foreigners in the country. Subsequently, in the early 1930s concession agreements were signed between the Liberian Government and Dutch, Danish, German and Polish investors. Barclay is credited with helping the country survive some of Liberia's greatest threats to its sovereignty in that country's history. These included threats by the League of Nations led by the German, British and American governments to occupy the country unless reforms were made, aggressive diplomatic intrigues by France and a coup attempt by the Firestone Tire and Rubber Company which owned much of Liberia's land.

=== Renegotiation of loan payments ===
In 1926, the Liberian government granted a major rubber concession to the Firestone Tire and Rubber Company and secured a $5 million loan through a Firestone subsidiary.

The Great Depression severely affected Liberia’s economy, as global rubber prices collapsed. By the early 1930s, rubber prices had fallen to only a few cents per pound, rendering production largely unprofitable and sharply reducing government revenues. Government income declined significantly during this period, contributing to a fiscal crisis.

By 1931, Liberia was unable to meet its loan obligations and sought relief from its creditors. In 1932, the Liberian legislature enacted a moratorium on loan repayments pending renegotiation.

The crisis prompted Liberia to appeal to the League of Nations, which established a commission to examine the country’s financial condition. The commission recommended a program of financial assistance combined with oversight measures, including the appointment of foreign advisers to key government functions.

Some members of the League advocated placing Liberia under a form of international control, but the Liberian government resisted measures it viewed as infringing on national sovereignty.

Following negotiations, a financial reorganization plan was implemented in 1934 under League supervision. The arrangement introduced external financial oversight while allowing Liberia to retain its formal independence and resume loan repayments.

=== World War II ===
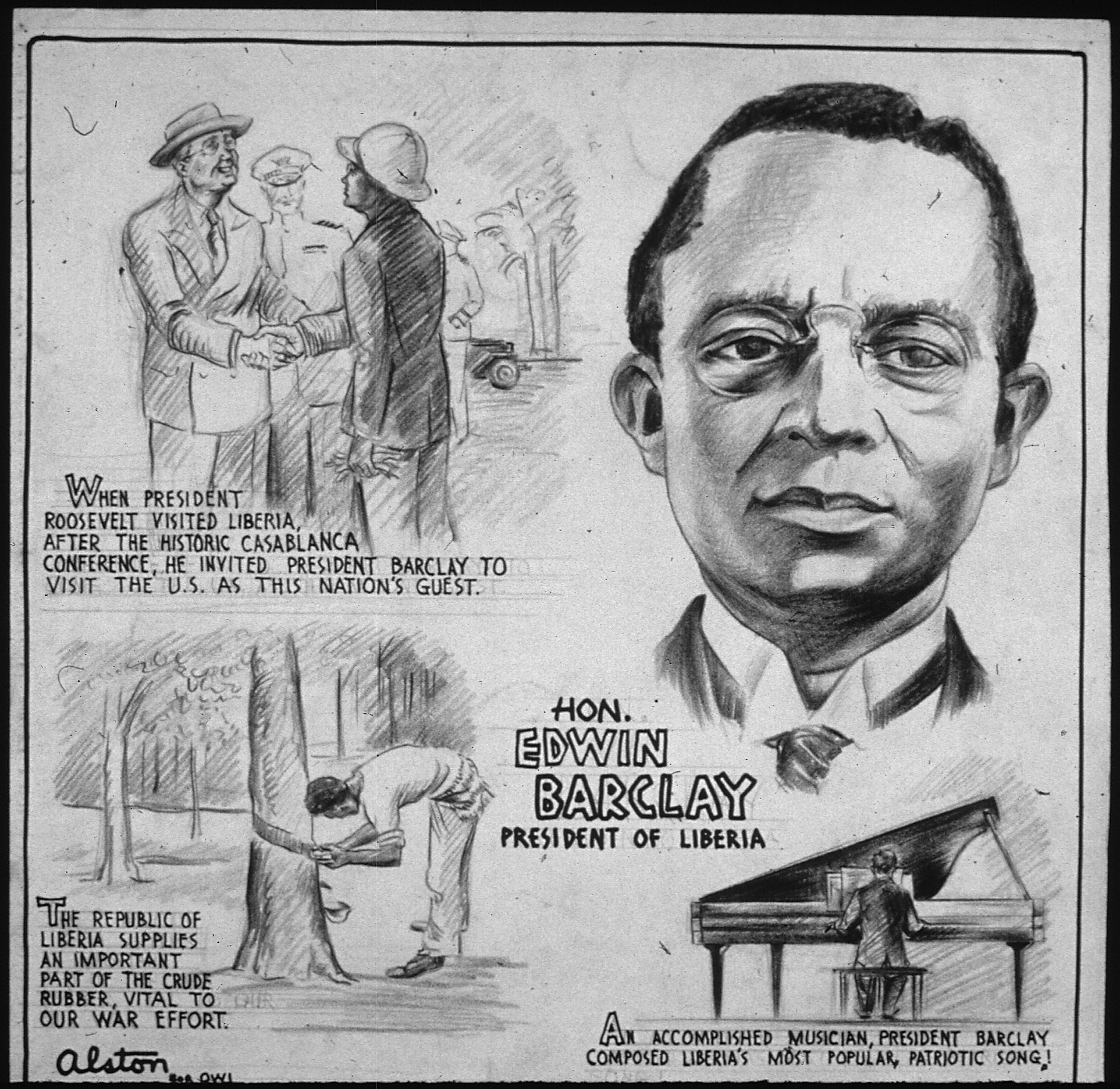
Poster from U.S. Office of War Information. Domestic Operations Branch. News Bureau, 1943

In 1937 President Barclay, under pressure from the United States, withdrew the concession agreement with the German investors, who were accused of sympathies with the Nazi regime in their home country. Until 3 January 1944, Barclay was Liberian President, to be succeeded by William Tubman.

==== Strategic importance of Liberia ====
After the fall of Malaysia and Singapore to the Japanese during World War II, Liberia became very strategically important as its rubber plantation was the only source of natural latex rubber available to the Allies, apart from plantations in Ceylon (now Sri Lanka). Among many other uses, natural rubber was needed to build tires for war planes, military jeeps, aircraft guns, and sensitive radar equipment. As a result of the simultaneous sharp increase in demand and drastic reduction in supply, prices soared for natural rubber in the United States and measures were taken to reduce demand.

Writing in his memoirs, former U.S. Secretary of State Cordell Hull wrote, "With Japan's occupation of the Rubber producing areas in the Far East, Liberia became of greatly increased importance to us as one of the few remaining available sources of natural rubber." President Barclay assured the Americans that Liberia would supply all the natural rubber that the United States and its allies needed for the war effort.

==== Defense Pact with the United States (1942) ====
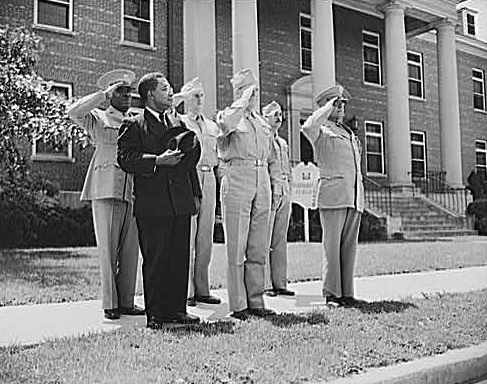
Barclay visiting the United States at Fort Belvoir

In 1942 Liberia signed a Defense Pact with the United States. This commenced a period of strategic development, including the construction of roads, airports and other infrastructure projects. Robertsfield Airport was built with runways long enough for B-47 Stratojet bombers to land for refueling, giving Liberia the longest runway in Africa to this day.

==== Provision of war supplies to the North African theater ====
The provision of war supplies to the North African theater was difficult, expensive, and time-consuming. German U-boats had taken complete control of the North Atlantic Ocean routes, making shipping in the North Atlantic Ocean hazardous to American warships and merchant vessels. In order to transport American soldiers and war supplies to North Africa, the United States needed to open up a South American-Liberian air corridor.

Because of its proximity to South America, Liberia became the first major West African bridgehead for the South Atlantic air ferry route. For this reason, the Liberian Government also granted to the United States use of its territory to store war supplies and to construct military bases in Montserrado County and Grand Cape Mount County at Fisherman's Lake. United States military supplies were collected in Florida, transported through South America to Brazil, then flown from Brazil to the military depot at Roberts Field. There 5,000 African-American troops stored and maintained the inventory. From Roberts Field, the war supplies were flown to their final destinations in Morocco, Tunisia and Algeria.

==== Franklin Roosevelt's visit to Liberia (1943) ====
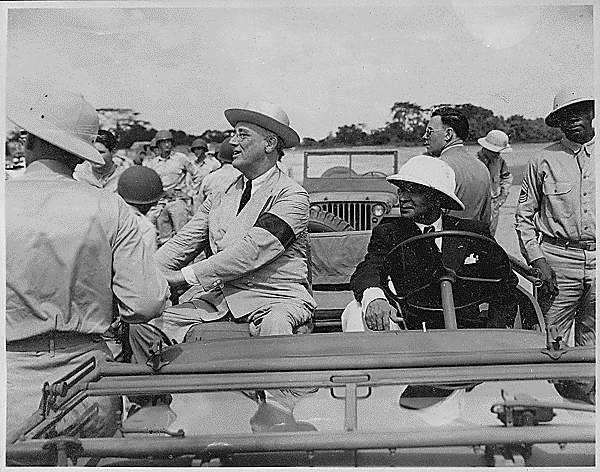
President Edwin Barclay (right) and President Franklin D. Roosevelt during World War II, 1943

Liberia's strategic importance to the Allied war effort was underscored in January 1943 when U.S. President Franklin D. Roosevelt visited the country following the Casablanca Conference. During the visit, Roosevelt sought to secure continued access to Liberia's natural rubber supplies, expand U.S. military facilities including Roberts Field, and encourage Liberia to sever remaining ties with Axis nationals. Liberia formally declared war on Germany and its allies on 27 January 1944.

In May 1943, President Edwin Barclay visited the United States, where he addressed the United States Congress. He was among the first African heads of state to be formally received and recognized by Congress during the wartime period.

== Retirement ==
Barclay retired in 1944 and was replaced by William Tubman. He ran against Tubman in the 1955 presidential election, but received only about 1,100 votes. He died a few months later.

== See also ==
- History of Liberia
- Americo-Liberians
- President of Liberia

Political offices
Preceded by Charles D. B. King	President of Liberia; 1930–1944	Succeeded by William Tubman
