= Alcindor =

Alcindor is a surname. Notable people with the name include:

- Aurelie Alcindor (born 1994), Mauritian sprinter
- Barbara Alcindor, French singer and lead singer of the pop band French Affair
- John Alcindor (1873–1924), Trinidadian physician
- Lew Alcindor or Kareem Abdul-Jabbar (born 1947), American basketball player
- Minnie Martin Alcindor (1879–1961), British pan-Africanist
- Regina Alcindor, Seychellois assemblywoman
- Yamiche Alcindor (born 1986), American journalist
