= Saint Mary's College, Trinidad and Tobago =

Catholic secondary school in Port-of-Spain, Trinidad and Tobago

St. Mary's College

Location
- 75 Frederick St. Port-of-Spain; Trinidad and Tobago; 10°39′31″N 61°30′36″W

Information
- Other name: College of the Immaculate Conception (CIC)
- Type: Government assisted secondary school
- Motto: Virtus et Scientia (Latin for 'Manliness and Knowledge')
- Religious affiliations: Catholic; Holy Ghost Fathers
- Established: 1 August 1863; 163 years ago
- Principal: Mrs. Jancinta Honore
- Teaching staff: 76
- Gender: All male
- Enrollment: 1,196
- Campus: Urban
- Houses: Lwanga; Laval; Bosco; Aquinas; Savio
- Student Union/Association: CIC Past Students Union
- Colour: Blue White
- Nickname: Saints
- Rival: Queen's Royal College/Fatima College
- Website: stmarys.edu.tt
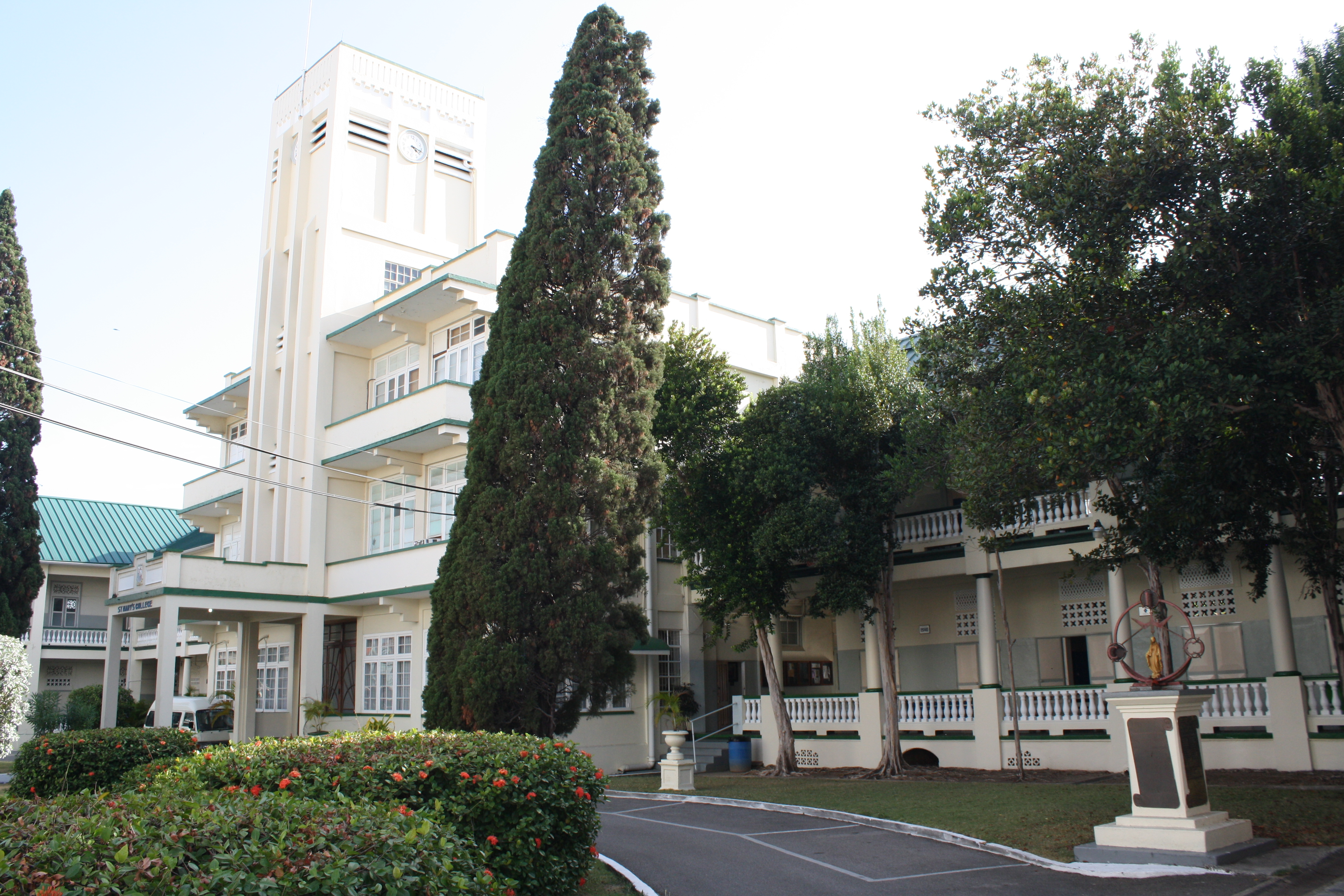
- Main building of St. Mary's College.

St. Mary's College (CIC, which stands for College of the Immaculate Conception) is a government-assisted selective Catholic secondary school located in Port of Spain, Trinidad and Tobago.

== Notable alumni ==
- Ellis Achong, West Indies Test cricketer
- John Alcindor, physician and activist who was the president of the African Progress Union from 1921.
- Emmanuel Amoroso, reproductive physiologist and developmental biologist
- Eugene Chen (1878–1944), Trinidadian-Chinese politician and foreign minister of Republic of China
- Ellis Clarke, first President of Trinidad and Tobago.
- Diego Cisneros, businessman
- Joshua Da Silva, West Indies Test cricketer
- Leslie Fitzpatrick, soccer player
- Angus Fraser (clergyman and teacher), founder of the Via Christi Society
- Wayne A.I. Frederick, President of Howard University
- Ken Gordon, businessman
- Shaka Hislop, football player
- Jillionaire, DJ and music producer
- John La Rose, publisher and cultural activist
- Clement Ligoure, physician and publisher
- Michael Mooleedhar, filmmaker
- Quintin O'Connor, union leader
- George Padmore (1903–1959), pan-Africanist, author
- Joseph Lennox Pawan, MBE, Trinidadian bacteriologist
- Clifford Roach, West Indies Test cricketer
- Harry Schachter, Canadian biochemist
- Stuart Young, Former Prime Minister of Trinidad and Tobago
