= Hackwood =

Hackwood is a surname. Notable people with the surname include:

- Frederick Hackwood (1851–1926), teacher, antiquarian, journalist, and writer
- Paul Hackwood (born 1961), English priest
- Susan Hackwood, American electrical engineer
- William Hackwood (c. 1757–1839), English sculptor

== See also ==
- Hackwood Stakes, flat horse race in Newbury, England
