= 1871 Liberian coup d'état =

Overthrow and death of President Edward James Roye

Date	October 1871
Location	Monrovia, Liberia
Result	Deposition and death of President Roye

Belligerents
(Liberia) True Whig Party	(Liberia) Republican Party

Commanders and leaders
(Liberia) Edward James Roye †	(Liberia) Joseph Jenkins Roberts

The 1871 Liberian coup d'état, also known as the Roye affair, resulted in the overthrow and death of President Edward James Roye of the True Whig Party and his eventual replacement by Joseph Jenkins Roberts of the Republican Party.

Roye, a wealthy businessman, had been elected president of Liberia at the 1869 general election as the first True Whig to hold the office. Early in his term a referendum was held to extend the length of the presidential term from two years to four years. Republicans refused to recognize the results as valid and instead organized a presidential election in 1871. Roye and the True Whigs considered the election unconstitutional and did not participate, with Republicans declaring Roberts to have been elected unopposed.

In October 1871, prompted by a controversial loan agreement signed by Roye's government, riots and street fights broke out between the supporters of Roye and Roberts. The Republicans sent multiple delegations demanding Roye's resignation, but he refused to resign and instead declared a state of emergency. He was ultimately arrested by a Republican mob on 28 October and imprisoned. Roye was initially succeeded by a provisional government and then by his vice-president James Skivring Smith, pending the commencement of Roberts' term in January 1872. Along with six of his supporters, Roye was convicted of treason in February 1872 and sentenced to death. He died in disputed circumstances while attempting to escape from custody a few days later.

== Background ==
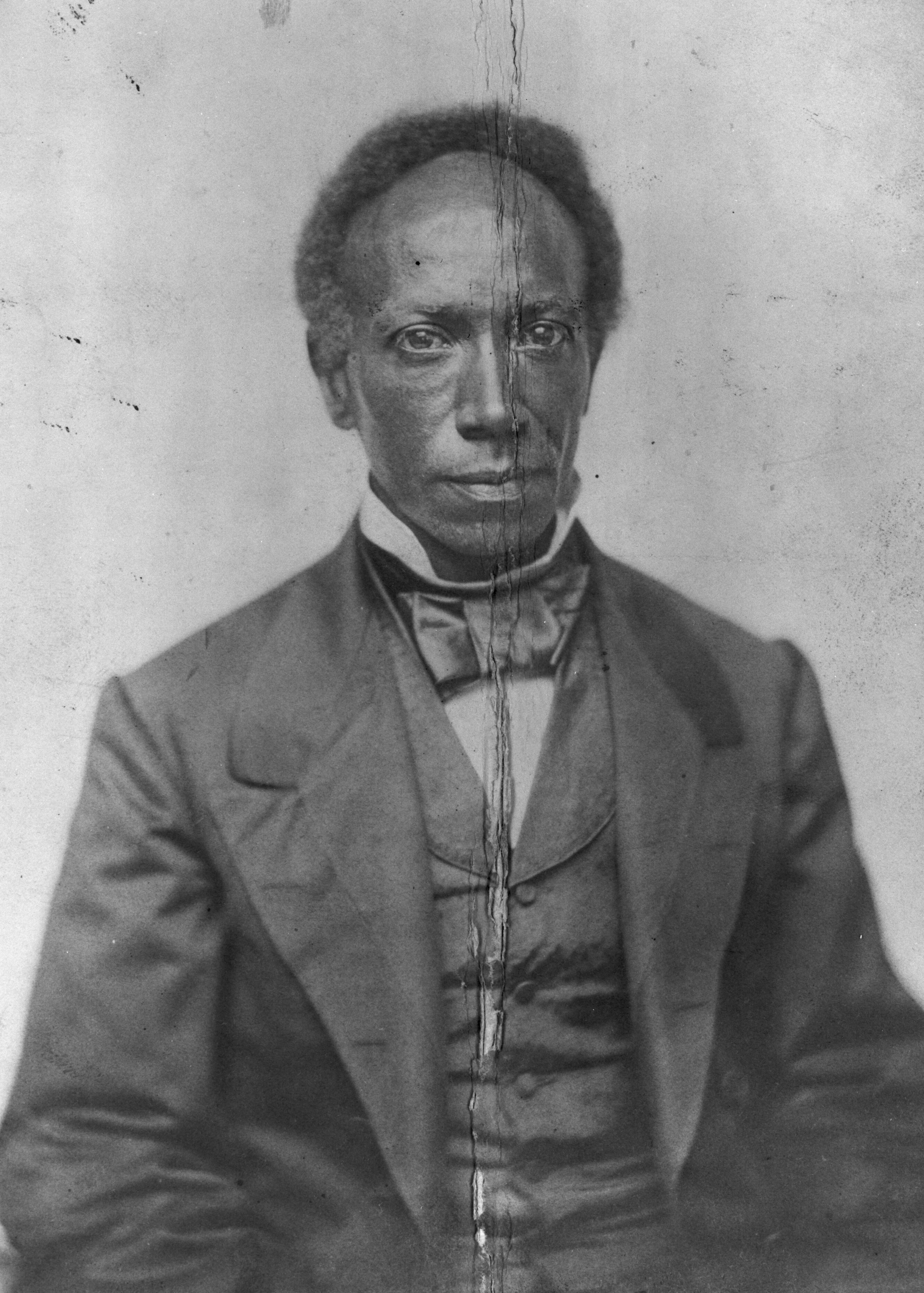
Edward James Roye

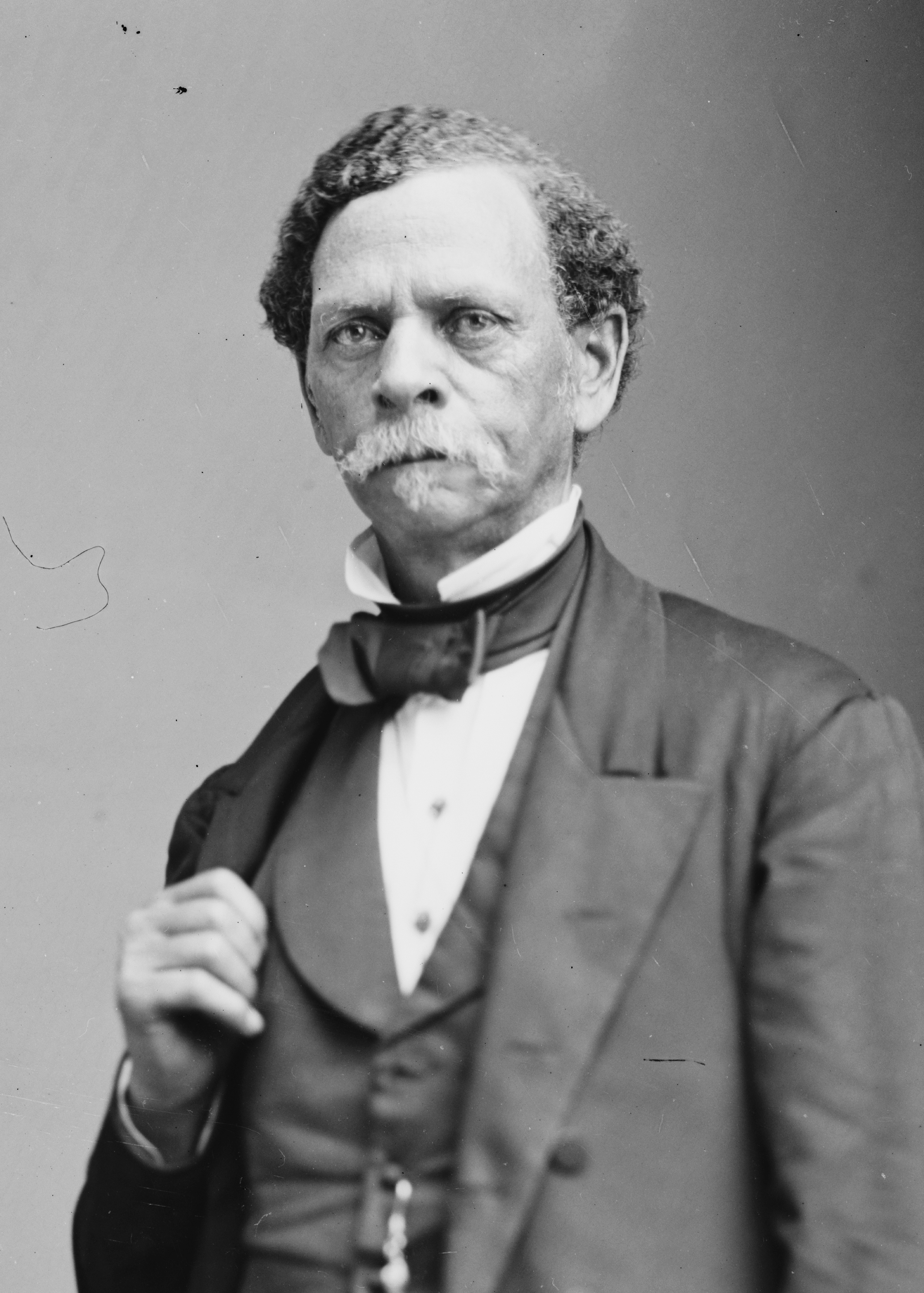
Joseph Jenkins Roberts

Roye became president of Liberia in 1870, having won the 1869 presidential election as the candidate of the True Whig Party. Roye was a wealthy Americo-Liberian businessman and dark-skinned member of the predominantly mulatto merchant class which dominated Liberian politics. Initially a member of the Republican Party, he later became the standard-bearer of the True Whigs, an alliance of "mostly dark-skinned upriver planters and the dark-skinned faction among the coastal merchants."

=== Term length dispute ===
In 1870, Roye sought a constitutional amendment to extend the presidential term from two years to four years. The result of the referendum was disputed by the Republican Party, which in May 1871 organized a presidential election. Roye and his True Whig supporters believed the election was invalid and did not participate. However, the Republicans declared their candidate Joseph Jenkins Roberts had been elected unopposed and intended him to take office in January 1871 in accordance with the existing constitution.

=== Loan controversy ===
Liberia experienced an economic depression in the late 1860s as a result of a decline in international trade, on which the Americo-Liberian ruling class was heavily reliant. In 1871, Roye's government obtained a loan of £100,000 (equivalent to $12,400,000 in 2024) from an English bank associated with David Chinery, the British consul in Monrovia. The terms of the loan were unfavourable and differed from that originally approved by the Liberian legislature, including a higher interest rate, a shorter loan period, and large upfront deductions resulting in a smaller sum immediately receivable by the Liberian treasury. Rumors circulated among Roye's opponents that he and his supporters were corrupt and had misappropriated funds from the loan proceeds.

== Coup ==
In September 1871, news of the terms of the loan agreement prompted riots in the capital Monrovia and street fights between the supporters of Roye and Roberts. At one point a cannon was fired into the presidential residence. The movement against Roye was spurred on by Roberts' return from a trip to England the following month. Republicans welcomed him as a president-elect with a 21-gun salute, while his supporters organised "citizens' meetings" aimed at Roye's removal. One of these meetings passed a resolution on 24 October demanding Roye's resignation as president. Two delegations of Republicans met with Roye to demand his resignation, but he refused and instead declared a state of emergency. A few days later, he attempted to leave the country on a British mail steamer but was prevented from leaving by a mob. On 28 October, Roye was arrested and detained along with his secretary of state and secretary of the treasury.

As Vice President James Skivring Smith was absent from the capital when Roye was overthrown, an interim three-member Chief Executive Committee was established on 26 October consisting of Reginald A. Sherman, Charles Benedict Dunbar, and Amos Herring. The committee ruled until Smith's return on 4 November 1871. Despite being impeached, Smith subsequently served out the remainder of Roye's term in office until Roberts formally succeeded as president on 1 January 1872.

== Aftermath ==
Following Roberts' inauguration as president, Roye, along with a number of his cabinet members and supporters, was charged with treason. He was found guilty on 10 February 1872 and sentenced to death by hanging, along with six other officials. Smith was acquitted of treason, while some others received pardons or had their sentences commuted.

Roye died a few days after his sentence was pronounced, in uncertain circumstances. His estate was confiscated by the Liberian government. According to contemporary dispatches from the U.S. minister in Liberia, Roye escaped from prison on the night following his conviction, but was pursued by a mob and drowned while attempting to swim to an English ship. However, Abayomi Wilfrid Karnga's 1926 history of Liberia instead states that Roye died in prison after being beaten by a mob which had discovered his escape attempt.

The 1871 coup has been described as "modern Africa's first coup d'état". According to Amos Sawyer, the 1871 coup "was the first serious test of the institutional arrangements set forth in the constitution". Roye's overthrow was referenced in the final report of Liberia's Truth and Reconciliation Commission in 2010, which summarized the coup as a "mulatto overthrow [...] of the first wholly black president".

== Sources ==
- Sawyer, Amos (1992). The Emergence of Autocracy in Liberia: Tragedy and Challenge (PDF). San Francisco, California: Institute for Contemporary Studies. ISBN 1558151648. LCCN 91-41511. OCLC 24701327. Archived from the original (PDF) on March 3, 2017.
