= Jane Roberts (first lady) =

First Lady of Liberia (c. 1819–1914)

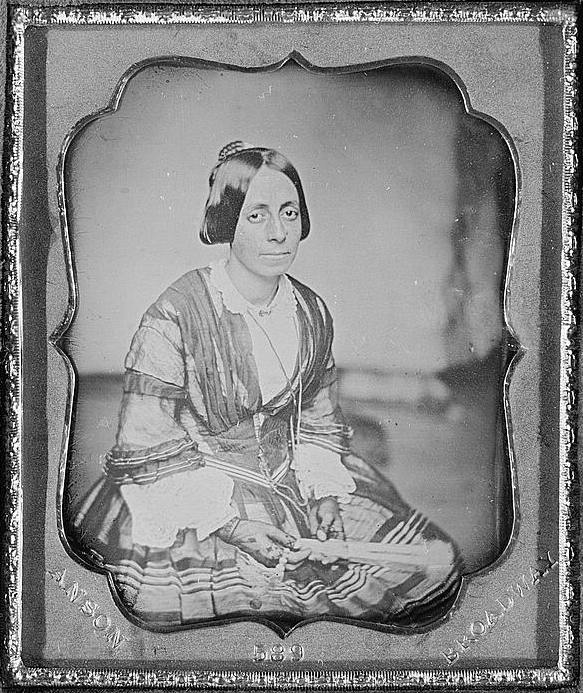
- Roberts in 1854
- Born: Jane Rose Waring c. 1819; Virginia, United States
- Died: January 10, 1914 (aged 94–95); London, England
- Resting place: Streatham Cemetery; London, England
- Spouse: Joseph Jenkins Roberts (m. 1836; d. 1876)

Jane Rose Waring Roberts (née Waring; c. 1819 – January 10, 1914) emigrated as a child with her free African American family to the Colony of Liberia, where she was educated and grew up as a member of the Americo-Liberian community.

She married politician Joseph Jenkins Roberts, also an American immigrant, who was appointed as governor of the colony. When he was elected President after Liberia's independence, she served as the first First Lady of the Republic of Liberia from 1848 to 1856. After he was re-elected, she served again from 1872 to 1876. She accompanied him on numerous diplomatic trips to other nations. She also promoted women's education.

As a widow, Roberts traveled to the United Kingdom in the late nineteenth century to raise funds to build a hospital in Monrovia; she met with Queen Victoria for a second time. From 1906 to her death, she lived in London with a political black couple, former mayor John Archer and his wife. She was interred at Streatham Cemetery in the city.

== Early life ==
Jane Rose Waring was born free in the American state of Virginia around 1819. She was one of several children in the Waring family, which was prominent in Virginia's sizeable free black community. Her father, Colston Waring, was a minister and a successful businessman. He sold his notable holdings in the United States in order to emigrate via the American Colonization Society to Liberia, a newly established colony in West Africa.

=== Emigration to Liberia ===
Jane's mother and her six children, including four-year-old Jane, followed Colston Waring and arrived in Liberia on February 13, 1824, having sailed on the Cyrus. Two of Jane's brothers, one older and one younger, died of "fever" in the first year. Another older brother and an older sister died in 1828.

The family settled in Monrovia, where her father established a profitable commercial firm. Colston Waring was appointed as vice colonial agent of Liberia and died in 1838.

Jane Waring was educated in Monrovia. She learned to read and write, and speak fluent French as well as English. She dedicated her life to Christian charities and the promotion of women's education.

== Marriage and family ==
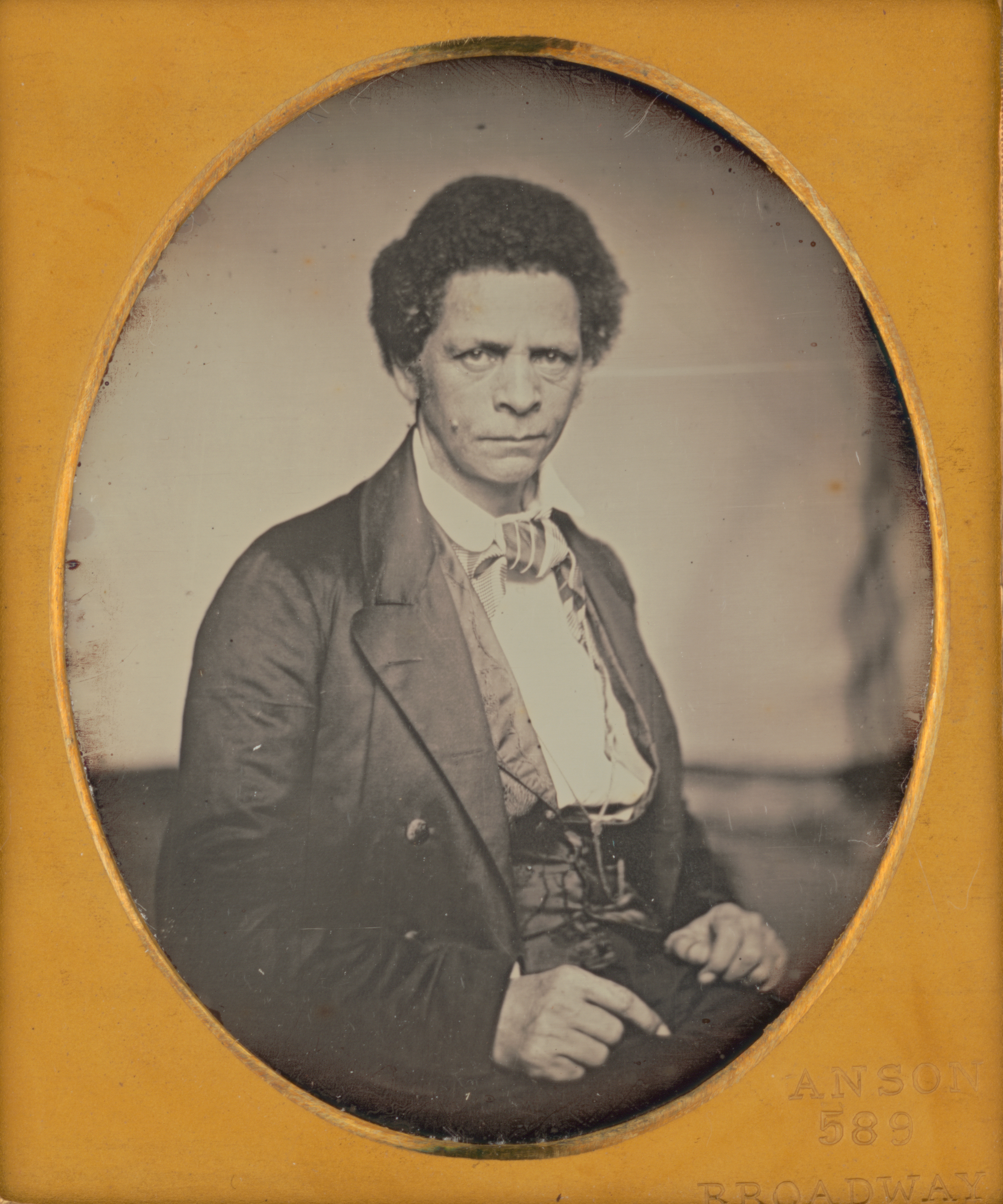
President Joseph Jenkins Roberts, c. 1851

In 1836, Waring at about the age of 17 married Joseph Jenkins Roberts. A widower, he was a free-born merchant from Virginia who had immigrated in 1829 to Liberia with his young family. His first wife and infant child died within the first seven years of their arriving at Monrovia.

Waring's marriage to Roberts connected the two families, consolidating their wealth and social status. The couple had one child together, Sarah Ann Roberts, in 1838. They sent her to England for much of her education. Sarah Ann married William A. Johnson.

== Political life ==
Joseph Jenkins Roberts advanced as a political leader and served as governor of Liberia from 1842 to 1848. Jane Roberts effectively served as the first First Lady. She also made contributions to farming, such as raising turkeys. She took a role in educating some Liberian children.

In 1847, the Commonwealth of Liberia declared independence and became the Republic of Liberia. Joseph Roberts was elected as Liberia's first president. He served until 1856. This lengthy tenure enlarged Jane's influence as the first First Lady of the nation.

President Roberts made diplomatic visits to several countries and met with several heads of state, in an effort to gain recognition for the Republic of Liberia. His wife Jane sometimes accompanied him, including to Barbados, the United States, England, Belgium, and France. When they made a state visit to England, Queen Victoria received the couple on her royal yacht and honored them with a seventeen-gun salute. The couple returned to Monrovia on a British warship. French President Louis Napoleon III met with the couple twice, including in 1851. Later his government donated equipment to the Liberian military.

In 1856, Joseph left the presidency. He was selected as president of the newly established Liberia College, serving until 1872. That year he returned to politics and was re-elected to Liberia's presidency. Jane Roberts again served as first lady.

In 1872, Roberts lost both a sister, Susannah (Waring) Lewis, and their mother, Harriet (Graves) Waring Brander. After being widowed, her mother had remarried by 1847 to Nathaniel Brander, who also was a politician. He served with Joseph Roberts as vice president.

Joseph Roberts died in 1876, soon after he resigned from the presidency. Jane had tried unsuccessfully to nurse him back to health when he was ill.

== Widowhood and death ==
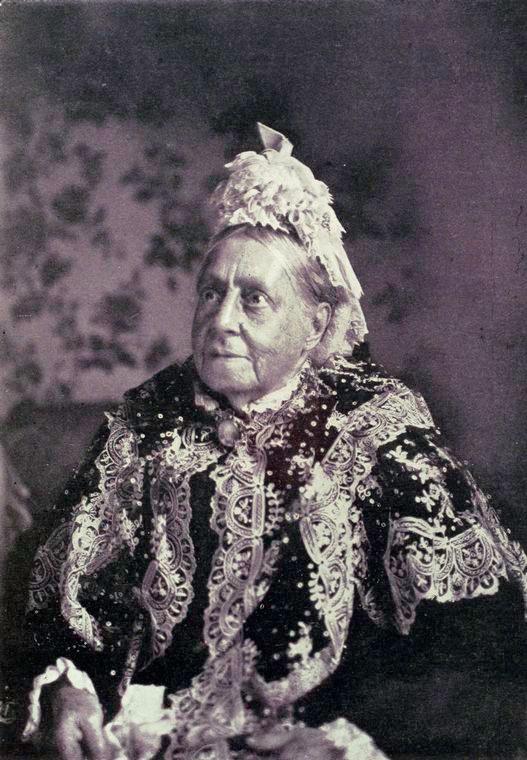
Jane Roberts, widow of Joseph Jenkins Roberts, in London, 1905

The widowed Jane Roberts continued to be active in her community. In 1887, she started a project to construct a hospital in Monrovia. While raising money, she visited the United States, where she dined with President Grover Cleveland and his wife at the White House. She was the only black woman to do so. President Cleveland contributed money to the hospital project. In 1891, she spoke at the annual meeting of the Pennsylvania Colonization Society, which had been one of the state societies supporting American settlement in Liberia.

In July 1892, Jane Roberts represented her government in meeting a second time with Queen Victoria, at Windsor Castle. She was to present a quilt for the queen, made by Americo-Liberian Martha Ricks over a period of twenty-five years. Roberts and the Liberian ambassador arranged for Ricks to accompany her and present the quilt personally to Victoria.

Decades later, African-American artist Elton Fax drew a quick illustration of this Roberts/Ricks-Queen Victoria meeting and a larger portrait of Roberts, based on the 1905 photograph on this page, and entitled "They'll Never Die". The brief piece was published in 1949 in local newspapers.

Roberts returned to England after the turn of the century. From 1906 until her death, she lived in London with a British couple, politician John Archer, the first black mayor of Battersea, a borough of London, and his wife Bertha. In England, she continued to raise funds for the Monrovia hospital, often through gifts from friends. Hallie Quinn Brown noted in a 1910 visit that Roberts at ninety-one years old was still "clear in mind and wonderfully active."

On January 10, 1914, Jane Roberts died in the Archer home. She was one of the oldest members of the Liberian community. She was interred at Streatham Cemetery in London.
