= 1871 Liberian general election =

- May 1871
- Presidential election
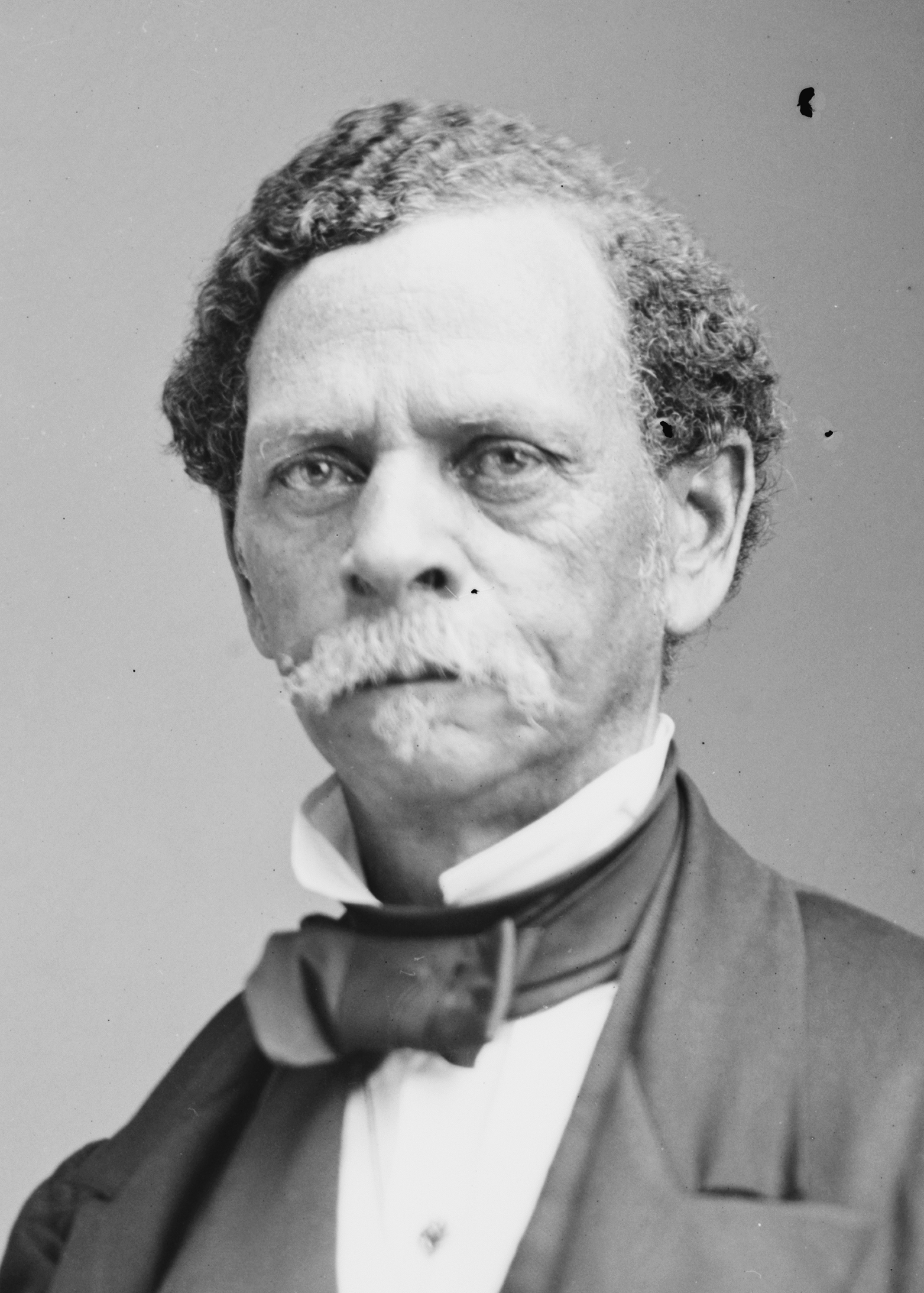
Nominee	Joseph Jenkins Roberts
Party	Republican
President before election
James Skivring Smith
Elected President
Joseph Jenkins Roberts
Republican

General elections were held in Liberia in May 1871.

Incumbent president Edward James Roye had been elected in the May 1869 elections and a referendum held on the same day as the elections had proposed extending the term of office of politicians from two to four years. Despite 99% of voters voting in favour, the Senate refused to approve the constitutional amendment required to implement the change. A re-run of the referendum was held in May 1870. Roye oversaw the counting of the votes and declared the proposal had been approved, but the Legislature, which was formally responsible for counting the votes declared the proposal had failed as Roye was not authorised to carry out the count.

The situation led to a dispute over whether the 1871 elections would go ahead or not. Popular opinion had swung against Roye, whose government had been accused of corruption and incompetence. Roye announced that due to an economic crisis, the elections would be postponed to allow him to make reforms to resolve the crisis, and then issued a proclamation banning the holding of elections.

However, the elections went ahead. Roye refused to take part, resulting in former president Joseph Jenkins Roberts of the Republican Party being elected president unopposed. Roye refused to accept the results, with the dispute eventually leading to a coup in October, which resulted in Roye's deposition and eventual death; James Skivring Smith served out the remainder of Roye's term, and Roberts took office as president on 1 January 1872.
