= Edward James Roye =

President of Liberia from 1870 to 1871

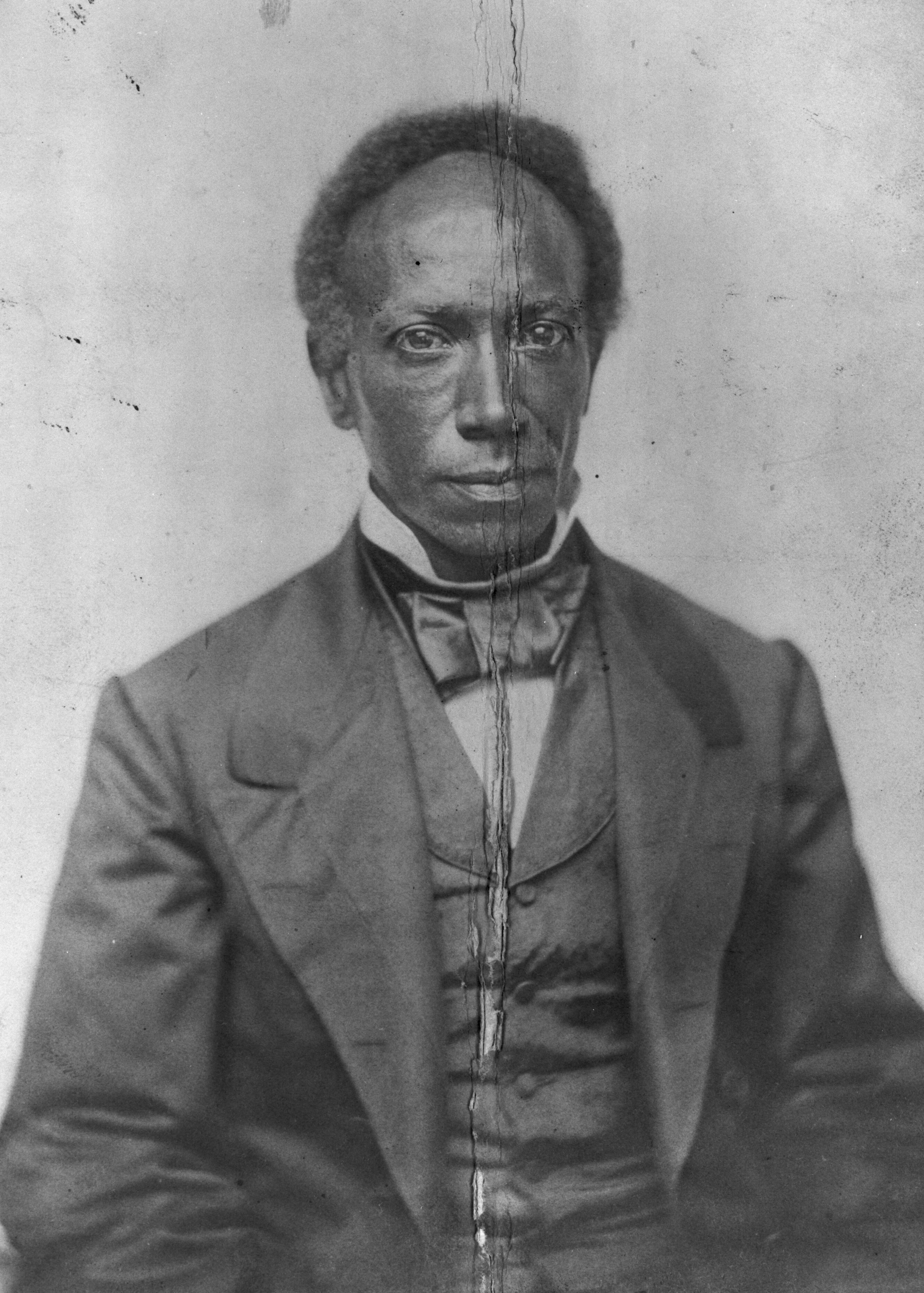
- Roye c. 1850

5th President of Liberia
- In office January 3, 1870 – October 26, 1871
- Vice President: James Skivring Smith
- Preceded by: James Spriggs Payne
- Succeeded by: James Skivring Smith

4th Chief Justice of Liberia
- In office 1865–1868
- Nominated by: Daniel Bashiel Warner
- Preceded by: Boston Jenkins Drayton
- Succeeded by: C. L. Parsons

Personal details
- Born: February 3, 1815 Newark, Ohio, United States
- Died: February 11, 1872 (aged 57) or February 12, 1872 (disputed)
- Party: True Whig

Edward James Roye (February 3, 1815 – c. February 11, 1872) was an Americo-Liberian merchant and politician who served as the fifth president of Liberia from 1870 until his overthrow in the 1871 Liberian coup d'état and subsequent death. He had previously served as the fourth Chief Justice of Liberia from 1865 until 1868. He was the first member of Liberia's True Whig Party to serve as president.

== Early life ==
Roye was born free on February 3, 1815, in Newark, Ohio. He was the son of John and Nancy Roye, formerly enslaved African-Americans who had moved to Ohio from Kentucky and bought property in Newark. They were reportedly of Igbo origin.

Roye's father managed a ferry across the Wabash River at Terre Haute, Indiana. He owned property in Newark, Terre Haute, and Vandalia, Illinois. Due to his family's prosperity, Roye was able to attend Ohio University. He moved to Terre Haute after his father's death in 1836, where he established the African-American community's largest barbershop.

== Emigration to Liberia ==
In 1846, attracted by the American Colonization Society's promotion of the relocation of African Americans to the colony of Liberia in West Africa, Roye emigrated to the colony with his family at the age of 31. There he set up business as a merchant, reportedly bringing $1,000 of capital (equivalent to $40,000 in 2025) with him. The next year, the colony gained independence. Within three years of his arrival, Roye became active in Liberian politics, serving as a representative and speaker (1849–1850) of the Liberian House of Representatives, and as chief justice of the Supreme Court of Liberia, He was also the Secretary of the Treasury. and unsuccessfully contested the presidential elections in 1855.

In 1857, Roye purchased the brig Eusebia for the purposes of conducting a trading business between Monrovia and New York City. His typical cargo included camwood, palm oil and ivory. By 1870 he reportedly had a fortune estimated at $200,000 (equivalent to $5,100,000 in 2025).

== Presidency (1870–71) ==
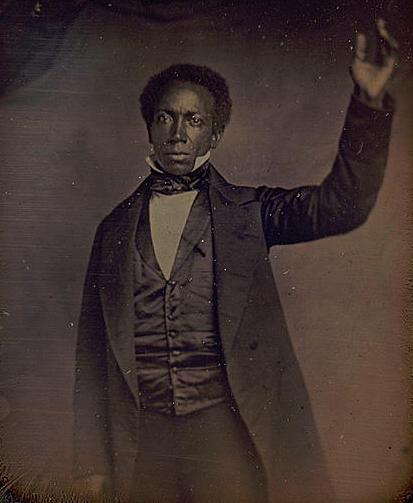
Daguerreotype of Roye (date uncertain)

Roye was inaugurated as President of Liberia on January 3, 1870. In the decades after 1868, escalating economic difficulties weakened the state's dominance over the coastal indigenous tribal peoples. Conditions worsened, the cost of imports was far greater than the income generated by exports of its commodity crops of coffee, rice, palm oil, sugarcane, and timber. Liberia tried desperately to modernize its largely agricultural economy.

After becoming president, Roye and the True Whigs sought a constitutional amendment to extend the presidential term from two years to four years. The proposal was passed at a referendum, but its result was disputed by the Republican Party which organised a presidential election in May 1871. Roye boycotted the election and the Republicans declared their candidate Joseph Jenkins Roberts had been elected unopposed.

=== Financial problems and British loan ===
In 1871, Roye tasked the speaker of the House of Representatives, William Spencer Anderson, with negotiating a new loan from British financiers. Anderson secured $500,000 under strict terms from the British consul-general, David Chinery, but was heavily criticised and eventually arrested. Anderson was apparently tried the following year for his part in securing the loan. He was found not guilty, but he was shot to death while leaving the courthouse.

The terms of the loan were unfavourable and differed from that originally approved by the Liberian legislature, including a higher interest rate, a shorter loan period, and large upfront deductions resulting in a smaller sum immediately receivable by the Liberian treasury. Rumours circulated among Roye's opponents that he and his supporters were corrupt and had misappropriated funds from the loan proceeds.

=== End of presidency ===
Roye was removed from the presidency on October 26, 1871, in what some allies called a coup d'état. The previous month, news of the loan agreement prompted riots in Monrovia and street fights between the supporters of Roye and Roberts. At one point a cannon was fired into the presidential residence. Roberts' supporters organised "citizens' meetings" aimed at Roye's removal, with one meetings passing a resolution on October 24 demanding Roye's resignation as president. Two delegations of Republicans met with Roye to demand his resignation, but he refused and declared a state of emergency. He attempted to leave the country on a British mail steamer but was prevented from leaving by a mob. On October 28, Roye was arrested and detained along with his secretary of state and secretary of the treasury. Vice President James Skivring Smith became acting president on November 4 following a period of rule by a three-member executive committee. Despite being impeached, Smith subsequently served out the remainder of Roye's term in office until Roberts formally succeeded as president on January 1, 1872.

== Death ==
Photograph of Roye published in a work by William Henry Heard, 1898

After his deposition, Roye and many other True Whigs were charged with treason and imprisoned. He was convicted of treason on February 10, 1872, and sentenced to death by hanging, along with six other officials.

Roye died a few days after his sentence was pronounced, in uncertain circumstances. His estate was confiscated by the Liberian government. Abayomi Wilfrid Karnga's 1926 history of Liberia stated that Roye died in prison after being beaten by a mob which had discovered his escape attempt. According to contemporary despatches from the U.S. minister in Liberia, he escaped from prison on the night following his conviction, but was pursued by a mob and drowned while attempting to swim to an English ship. Some accounts, possibly spread by political opponents, stated that he drowned due to the weight of British currency that he had tied around himself.

The portrait of Roye in the gallery of Executive Mansion, Monrovia, notes his date of death as February 11, 1872.

== Legacy ==
The town of Royesville, bordering the city of Brewerville, was named after Roye. President William Tubman named the presidential yacht "The Edward J. Roye", after President Roye. Roye's portrait was also featured on the front of the five-dollar banknote of the Liberian dollar.

The headquarters of the True Whig Party was named the Edward J. Roye Building. The building was located on Ashmun Street, which according to one account of his death was the place where he was "captured, beaten and dragged through the streets naked until he died".

== See also ==
- History of Liberia
- List of unsolved deaths

Political offices
Preceded by James Spriggs Payne	President of Liberia; 1870–1871	Succeeded by James Skivring Smith
Legal offices
Preceded by Boston Jenkins Drayton	Chief Justice of Liberia; 1865–1868	Succeeded by C. L. Parsons
