= Wednesbury Herald =

English newspaper

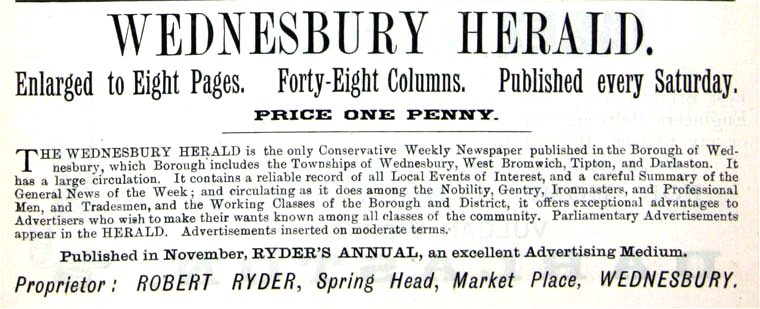
Wednesbury Herald advertising, 1884.

The Wednesbury Herald was a weekly newspaper published in the Municipal Borough of Wednesbury, England, during the Victorian era. It billed itself as the only conservative paper published there. The publisher was Robert Ryder and an associated Ryder's Annual was published each November. Microfilm copies of the paper are held by Sandwell Metropolitan Borough Council archives.

== See also ==
- Frederick Hackwood
