= Streatham Cemetery =

Cemetery in England

Coordinates: 51.433455°N 0.174450°W

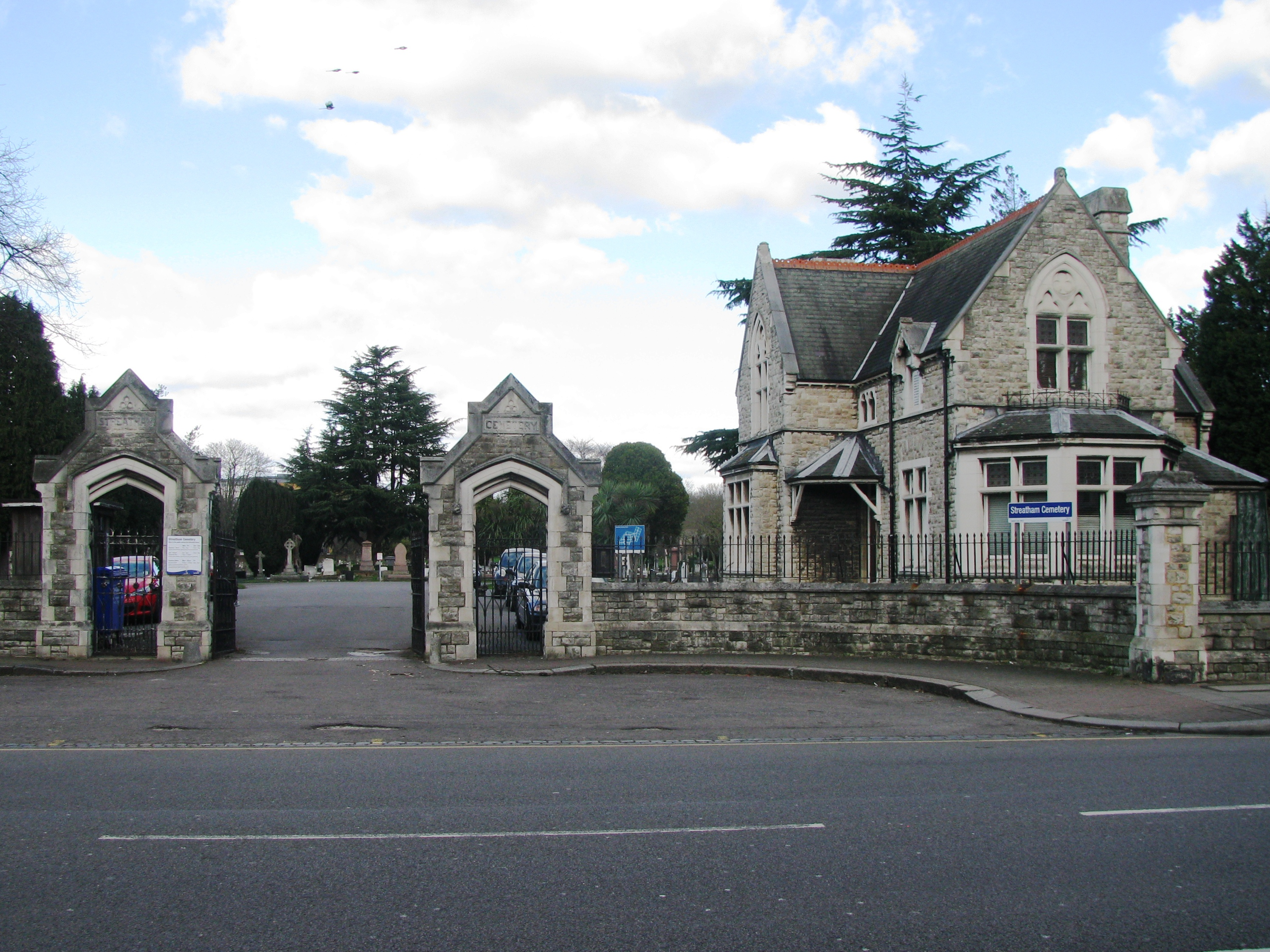
The entrance to Streatham Cemetery

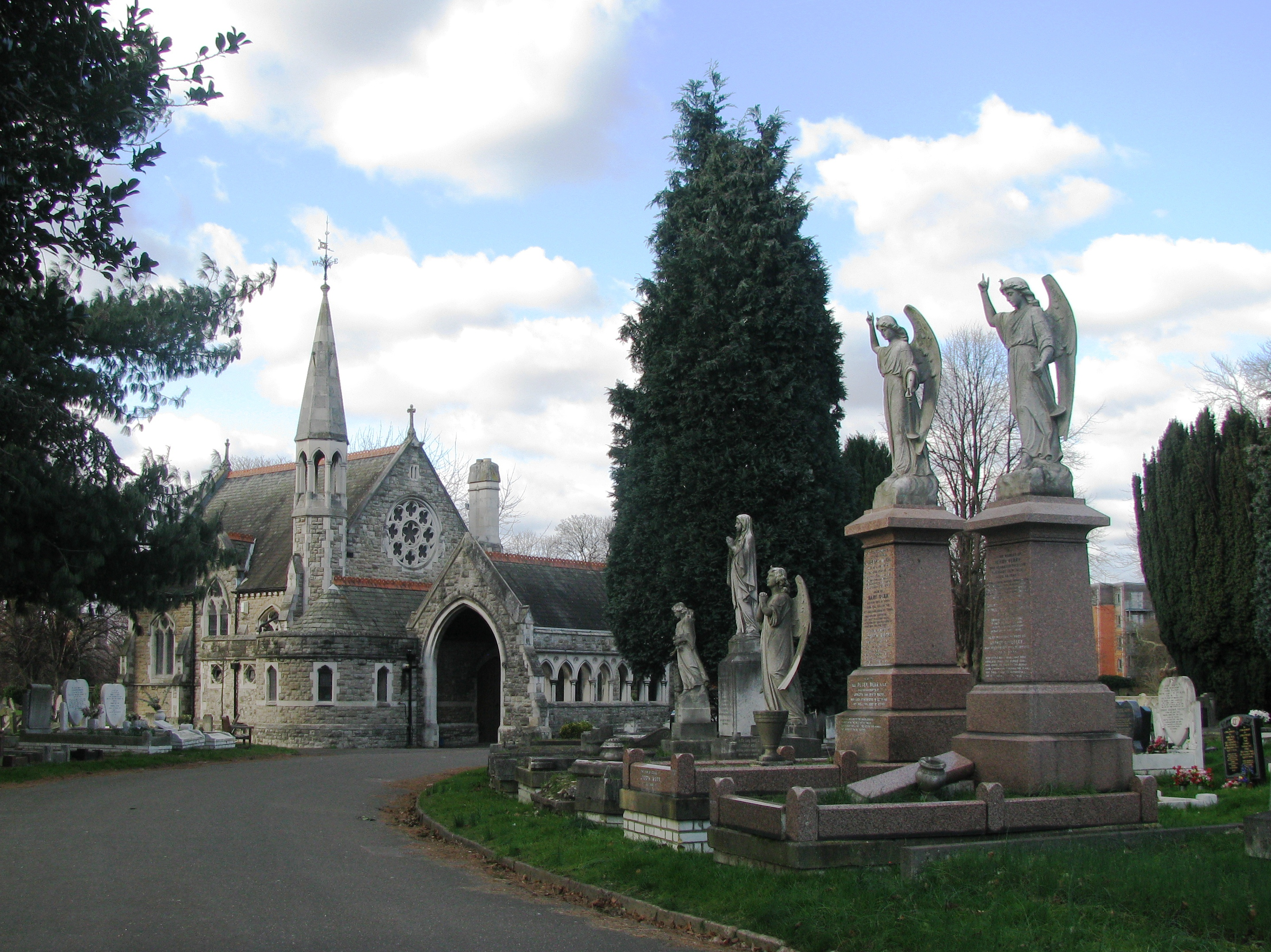
The chapel at Streatham Cemetery

Streatham Cemetery is a cemetery on Garratt Lane in Tooting, London; it is one of three cemeteries managed by Lambeth London Borough Council, the others being West Norwood Cemetery and Lambeth Cemetery. Both Streatham and Lambeth Cemeteries are located within the London Borough of Wandsworth.

== History ==
Under the Metropolitan Burial Act 1852 (15 & 16 Vict. c. 85), which followed the second cholera epidemic of 1848–49, the Streatham Burial Board acquired the land for a cemetery in what was countryside at the time. The cemetery opened for burials in 1894 and was provided with two lodges and two mirror-image chapels built in the Gothic style by William Newton Dunn. The cemetery was subjected to extensive "lawn conversion" from 1969 to 1991 and many monuments were removed. There are new graves available and burials are possible in chambers.

The cemetery has a large number of burials of casualties from World War I (218) and World War II (167) which are maintained by the Commonwealth War Graves Commission.

== Notable burials ==
- Sir Wyke Bayliss (1835–1906), artist, author and poet
- Edward Foster VC (1886–1946), recipient of the Victoria Cross during World War I
- Frederick Hackwood (1851–1926), antiquarian
- Jan Kwapiński (1885–1964), Polish independence activist and politician
- Vera Menchik (1906-1944) First and longest reigning Women's world chess champion
- Jane Roberts (c. 1819–1914), First Lady of Liberia
- Charlie Wilson (1932–1990), one of the gang who committed the Great Train Robbery of 1963
