= Frederick Hackwood =

British author and teacher (1851–1926)

Frederick William Hackwood FRHS
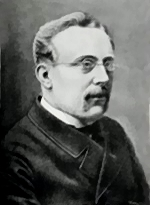
- Born: 18 April 1851; Wednesbury, West Midlands, UK
- Died: 4 December 1926 (aged 75); Balham, London, UK
- Education: St. Peter's Teachers Training College, Saltley
- Occupations: Headmaster, writer
- Spouse: Sarah Phoebe Simkin

Frederick William Hackwood FRHS (18 April 1851 – 4 December 1926) was an English teacher, antiquarian, journalist, and prolific non-fiction writer who produced more than 30 books. He was born in Wednesbury, West Midlands and served that town as a justice of the peace, historian, and councillor. He wrote for the Wednesbury Herald for twenty years.

== Early life ==
Frederick Hackwood was born on 18 April 1851 at 69 High Street East, Wednesbury, to Enoch and Sarah Hackwood. His father was a tailor and the family had moved to Wednesbury from Stoke-on-Trent in the mid-18th century. The family's origins in Staffordshire were said in Hackwood's obituary to date back to the 13th-century. An ancestor, William Hackwood, worked with John Flaxman in producing designs for Josiah Wedgwood.

In 1868, Hackwood gained admission to St. Peter's Teachers Training College, Saltley.

== Career ==
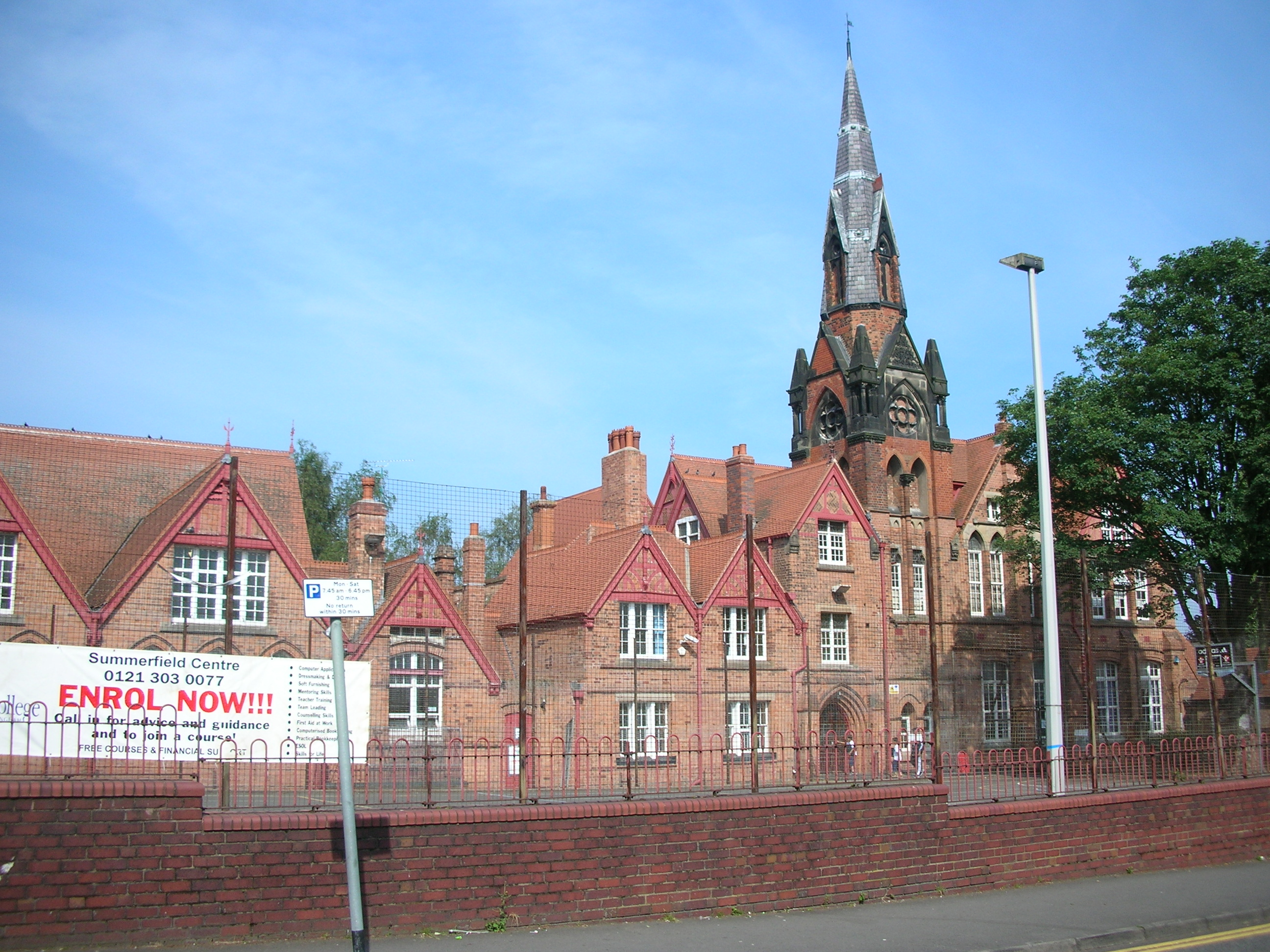
Dudley Road Board School, Birmingham

Hackwood was appointed headmaster of the Wednesbury parish church schools in 1872. Subsequently, he became headmaster in 1878 of the Dudley Road Board School, Birmingham, and then of Soho Road Board School in 1888. He retired from this final post in 1916.

His first book was Notes of Lessons on Moral Subjects, a Handbook for Teachers in Elementary Schools (Nelson, 1883) that he explained in the preface was necessitated by the Department of Education's guidance in 1878 to School Inspectors that they should pay special attention to moral teaching and not hesitate to recommend a reduction in the government grant if schools were found lacking in that respect. Accordingly, the book included lessons on Honesty, Obedience to Parents, Temperance etc. It received a wide circulation, including in the United States and Australia.

Hackwood wrote over 30 non-fiction books, most numerously on the history of the Black Country and West Midlands of England, some of which were produced in editions as small as 25 copies. He was a fellow of the Royal Historical Society and a member of the William Salt Archaeological Society. Towards the end of his life he wrote a number of popular history books for T. Fisher Unwin such as Old English Sports (1907), Inns, Ales, and Drinking Customs of Old England (1909), and The Good Old Times. The Romance of Humble Life in England (1910). He wrote for the Wednesbury Herald for twenty years and for many other journals. Two of his pseudonyms were "Old Woden" and "Muz".

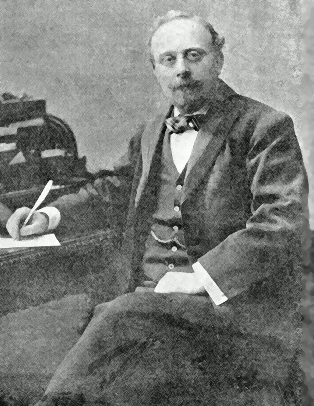
Frederick Hackwood, c.1897

He co-founded the Wednesbury Institute in 1884, founded the Horticultural Society, and in the early 1870s set up the town's first football club, Wednesbury F.C., later known as Wednesbury Strollers F.C. He was a player himself but lost interest in the game after it became professional.

He was a justice of the peace, a freemason, and served on Wednesbury Borough Council as an independent radical from 1887 to 1893.

== Personal life ==
In 1874, Hackwood married Sarah Phoebe Simkin and they had a son, Harold, and a daughter, Louisa. They lived at Comberford Lodge, Bridge Street, Wednesbury, until a fire at a nearby colliery resulted in a move to Handsworth.

== Death and legacy ==
In his later years, Hackwood lived near his son at 2 Veronica Road, Balham, south London, where he died on 4 December 1926 at the age of 75. His funeral was at Streatham Cemetery. An oil painting of Hackwood by T. Murray Bernard Bladon is in the collection of Sandwell Museums.

== Selected publications ==
The publications of Frederick Hackwood include:

=== Educational ===
- Notes of Lessons on Moral Subjects, a Handbook for Teachers in Elementary Schools. Nelson, 1883. (Nelson's School Series)
- The Practical Method of Class Management. A ready guide of useful hints to young class teachers. G. Philip & Son, London, 1896.
- Natural History Reference Notes to accompany Philips' “Typical” Series of Natural History Pictures, etc. Philip & Son, London, 1897.
- Notes of Lessons on the Church Service: A handbook for teachers, etc. Sonnenschein & Co., London, 1897.
- New Object Lessons. Animal Life. Pearson (C. A.) Pearson's Teachers' Series. [1898]
- Chatty Object Lessons in Nature Knowledge &c. Longmans, Green & Co., London, 1900.

=== West Midlands and the Black Country ===
- The Wednesbury Papers. R. Ryder, Wednesbury, 1884. (Reprinted from the Wednesbury Herald and the Midland Advertiser]
- A History of Darlaston, Near Wednesbury. Horton Brothers, 1887.
- Wednesbury Workshops; or, Some Account of the Industries of a Black Country Town. Horton Brothers, The Woden Press, Wednesbury, 1889.
- History of Tipton in Staffordshire. 1891.
- A History of West Bromwich. Birmingham News' & Printing Co, Birmingham, 1895. (Reprinted from the Midland Sun)
- Some Records of Smethwick. Telephone Printing Co., Smethwick, 1896. (Reprinted from the Smethwick Telephone)
- Wednesbury Faces, Places, and Industries. Robert Ryder, Wednesbury, 1897. (contributed most of the text)
- Olden Wednesbury: Its Whims and Ways ... Reprinted from the "Wednesbury Herald" etc.. Ryder & Son, Wednesbury, 1899.
- Religious Wednesbury: Its Creeds, Churches, & Chapels. 'Herald' Press, Dudley, 1900. (Reprinted from the Dudley Herald)
- Wednesbury Ancient and Modern: Being Mainly its Memorial and Municipal History. Ryder & Son, Wednesbury, 1902. (Reprinted from the Wednesbury Herald)
- The Chronicles of Cannock Chase. Mercury: Lichfield & Elliot Stock, London, 1903. (Reprinted from the Lichfield Mercury)
- The Story of the Black Country. Whitehead Brothers, Wolverhampton, [1902].
- Staffordshire Curiosities & Antiquities. Birmingham, 1905. (Reprinted from the Staffordshire Chronicle)
- Handsworth: Old & New. A History. Frederick Hackwood, Handsworth, 1908. (Reprinted from The Handsworth Herald)
- "The Annals of Willenhall". The Online Books Page. Wolverhampton: Whitehead Brothers. 1908.
- Staffordshire Worthies. Chronicle Press, Stafford & [Frederick Hackwood], Birmingham, 1911. (Reprinted from the Staffordshire Chronicle)
- Oldbury and round about in the Worcestershire corner of the black country. Whitehead Bros, Wolverhampton; Cornish Bros, Birmingham, 1915.
- Staffordshire Customs, Superstitions & Folklore. Mercury Press, Lichfield, 1924. (Reprinted from the Lichfield Mercury)
- Glimpses of Bygone Staffordshire. Mercury Press, Lichfield, 1925. (Reprinted from The Lichfield Mercury)

=== Other ===
- Christ Lore: Being the Legends, Traditions, Myths, Symbols, Customs, and Superstitions of the Christian Church. Elliot Stock, London, 1902.
- The Birmingham Midlands: the geography and history of the counties of Warwick, Stafford and Worcester. 1906.
- Old English Sports. T. Fisher Unwin, London, 1907.
- Inns, Ales, and Drinking Customs of Old England. T. Fisher Unwin, London, 1909.
- The Good Old Times. The Romance of Humble Life in England. T. Fisher Unwin, London, 1910.
- Good Cheer. The Romance of Food and Feasting. T. Fisher Unwin, London, 1911.
- William Hone: His Life and Times. 1912.;
- The Life of Lord Kitchener. 1912.
- The Story of the Shire: Being the Lore History and Evolution of English County Institutions. Heath Cranton, London, [1921].
- Dragons and Dragon Slayers. R.T.S., London, [1923].
- The Bridal Book: Being the Lore, History & Philosophy of Love, Courtship & Marriage. Heath Cranton, London, [1923].
