= John Alcindor =

Trinidad-born physician and pan-Africanist

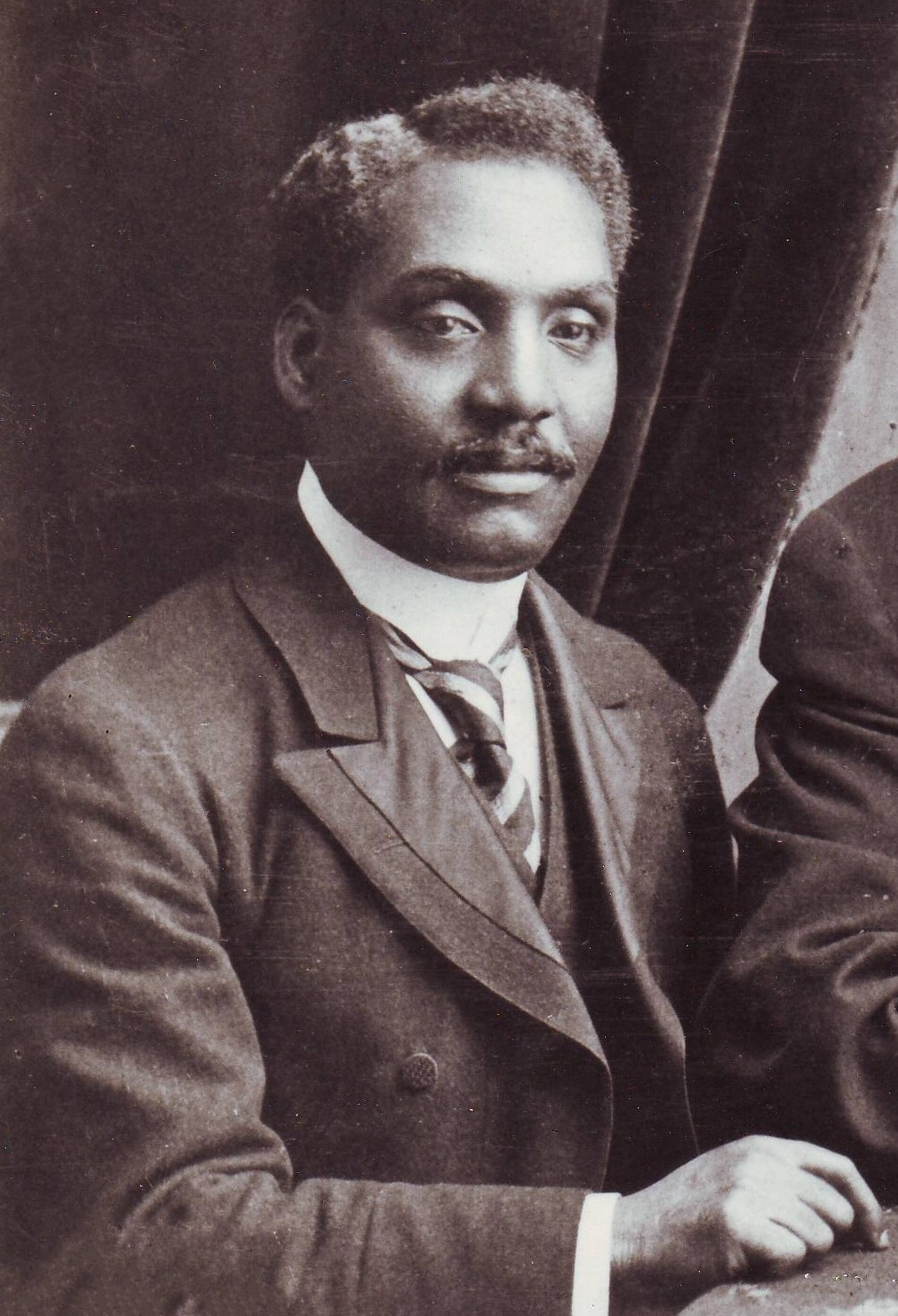
- Born: 8 or 9 July 1873; Port of Spain, Trinidad
- Died: 25 October 1924 (aged 51); Paddington, London, England
- Education: Saint Mary's College; Edinburgh University
- Occupations: Physician and activist
- Known for: President of the African Progress Union
- Spouse: Minnie Martin (m. 1911)
- Relatives: Kareem Abdul-Jabbar (great-nephew)

John Alcindor (8 or 9 July 1873 – 25 October 1924) was a Trinidadian physician and Pan-Africanist activist who lived and worked in London. He served as president of the African Progress Union from 1921 and was awarded a British Red Cross Medal for his medical work during World War I. He is also known for his work as a medical officer in Paddington, where he became locally known as the "black doctor of Paddington".

== Early life and education ==
Alcindor was born on 8 or 9 July 1873 in Port of Spain, Trinidad, to Francis Alcindor, a cocoa planter, and his wife. Little is known about his family, although his complexion has been cited as evidence of African ancestry. The family was sufficiently affluent to afford his education at the Catholic then private school, Saint Mary's College. In 1892, he won one of the four Island Scholarships at the school which funded his pursuit of higher education in Britain.

In October 1893, Alcindor began studying medicine at the University of Edinburgh. During his studies he also worked at hospitals in Glasgow, including the Belvidere Fever Hospital and studied at Anderson's College (now the University of Strathclyde). In July 1899 he graduated from the University of Edinburgh with the degrees of Bachelor of Medicine and Bachelor of Surgery (MB BCh).

== Medical career ==
After graduating, Alcindor moved to London. Between October 1899 and 1907 he worked at various hospitals across London, including Paddington Infirmary (now Paddington General Hospital), St Mary's Plaistow, the North London Hospital for Consumption (now Mount Vernon Hospital) and the Hospital of St Francis, a vegetarian and anti-vivisection hospital. In 1907 Alcindor established his own general practise in Paddington.

Alongside his work as a physician, Alcindor also undertook research. His first article on influenza was published in 1907 in the General Practitioner and was followed by a 1908 publication on cancer in the British Medical Journal and a 1913 publication on tuberculosis in The Practitioner. He also wrote about the correlation between cancer and poverty, examining the effects of unhealthy surroundings and poor diet.

In 1914, after the break out of World War 1, Alcindor applied for a commission in the Royal Army Medical Corps but was subsequently rejected because of his "colonial origin". Despite this, Alcindor remained determined to aid war efforts and signed up as a British Red Cross volunteer. As a volunteer he treated wounded returned soldiers at London railway stations. He was later awarded a Red Cross Medal for his work during the war.

After the war, Alcindor worked as one of four district medical officers in Paddington. His work involved treating patients at their homes or at his practise on Harrow Road. Through this work he grew to be a well-established member of the community and became known as "the black doctor of Paddington". In particular, his provision of free medical care for patients unable to pay earned him respect locally. In 1923 he resigned from his position.

In 1924 Alcindor became the secretary of the Poor Law Medical Officers Association. He was also a member of the National Council for Combating Venereal Disease and the American Anti-Tuberculosis Society.

== Activism ==
In the late 1890s, Alcindor began associating with Henry Sylvester Williams and the Pan African Association. In 1900, he attended the Association's First Pan-African Conference in London, as one of two delegates from Edinburgh's Afro-West Indian Society. At the conference he met composer Samuel Coleridge‐Taylor and civil rights activist W. E. B. Du Bois, both of whom later became friends of Alcindor.

In 1921, Alcindor became the second president of the African Progress Union, succeeding John Archer. During his leadership of the Union, he guided students and protested against bigotry in public life. He presided on the first day of the 2nd Pan-African Congress in 1921, with Rev. W. H. Jernagin and also spoke at the 3rd Pan-African Congress in November 1923.

Alcindor also had links with American groups including, the Anti-Slavery Society and the International Bureau for the Protection of Native Races.

== Personal life ==
After his move to London, Alcindor played cricket, as a wicket keeper for local teams. During this time, he also met journalist Minnie Martin, whom he married in 1911. Martin was a white British woman and due to the social stigma surrounding interracial marriage in the period, was subsequently disowned by her family for marrying Alcindor. The couple had three sons, John, Cyril and Roland.

Having attended a Catholic school in his youth, Alcindor remained a Catholic throughout his life and was a regular churchgoer. He was also a member of the Catholic Doctor's Society. Despite Martin not sharing Alcindor's religious beliefs, the couple sent their three sons to Catholic schools.

Alcindor was also the great-uncle of basketball player Kareem Abdul-Jabbar (born Ferdinand Lewis Alcindor, Jr.).

== Death and legacy ==
Alcindor died on 25 October 1924 in St Mary's Hospital, Paddington and was buried in St Mary's Catholic Cemetery.

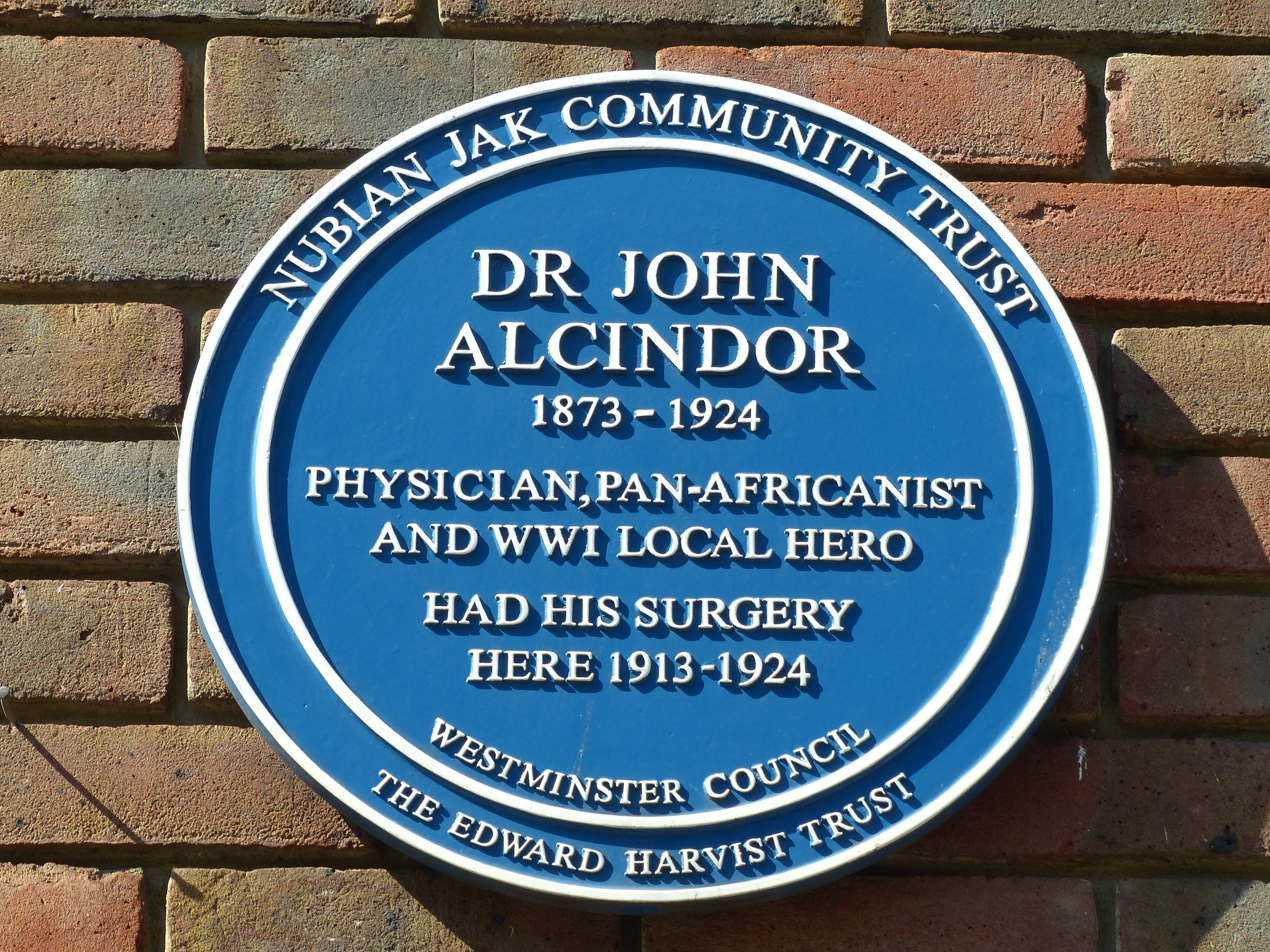
Blue plaque honouring John Alcindor in Paddington, London.

Following his death, his widow, Martin, established a residential accommodation for African students in Arundel Gardens.

In July 2014, a blue heritage plaque in Alcindor's honour was unveiled at the site of Alcindor's practise, which is now the Medical Centre in Harrow Road, Paddington. The plaque was organised by the Nubian Jak Community Trust as part of a initiative to commemorate historic Black figures.
