= Edward J. Roye Building =

Architectural structure

Coordinates: 6.317336°N 10.802740°W

Inauguration of President Tolbert, 1976; the Roye Building is the skyscraper in the background

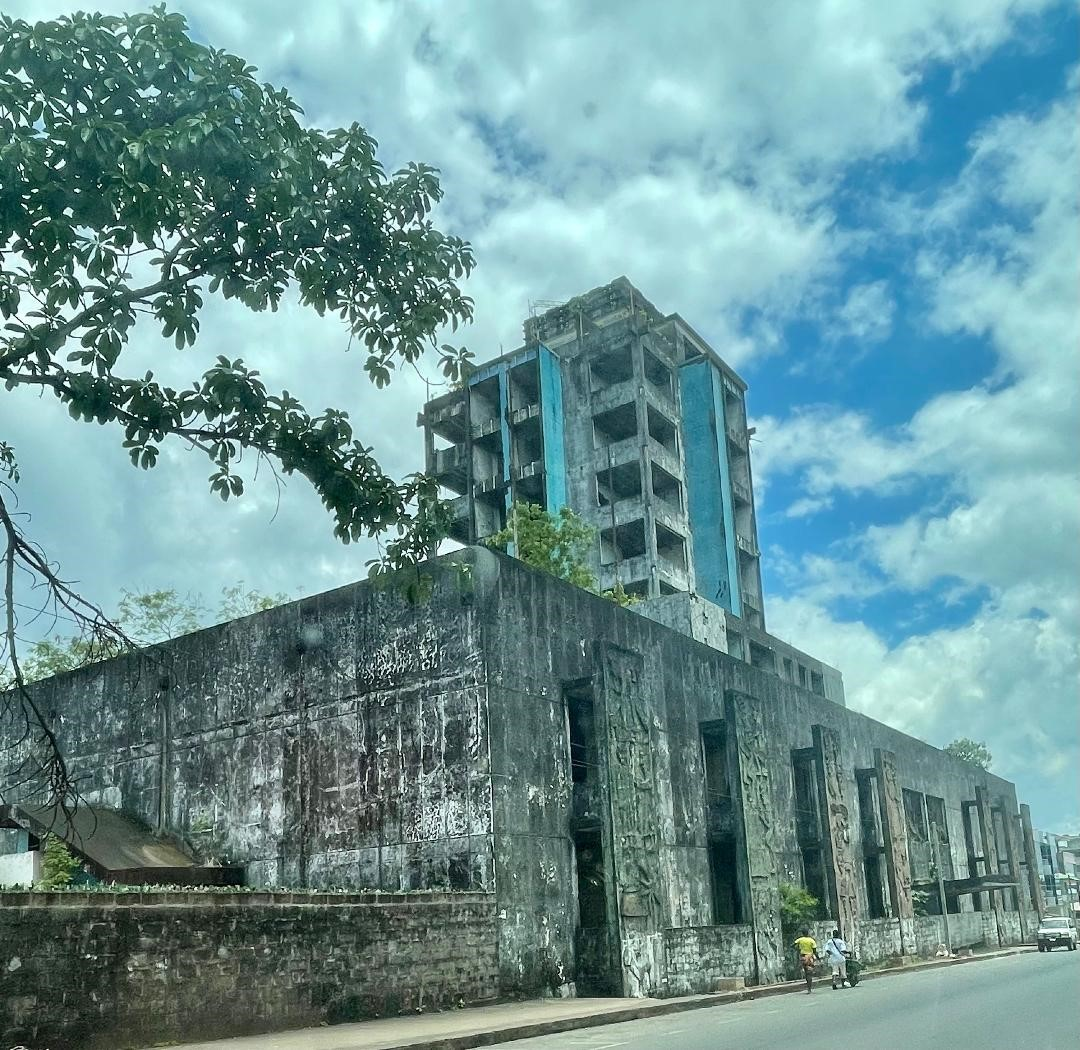
E.J. Roye tower has sat vacant for years.

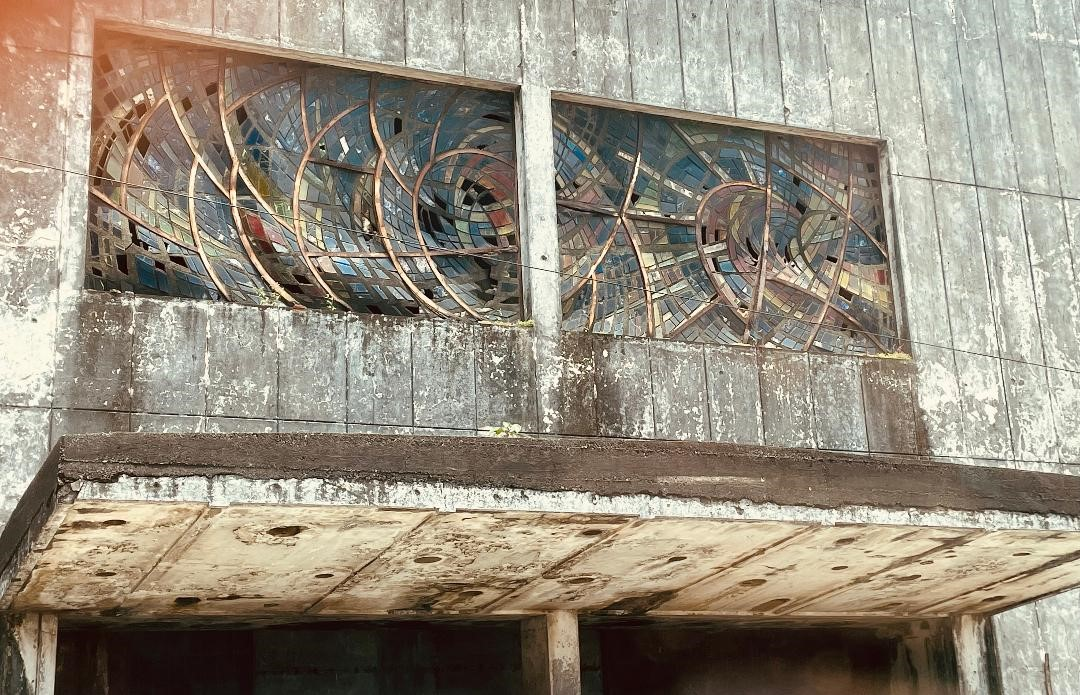
Damaged stained glass window above the building's entrance.

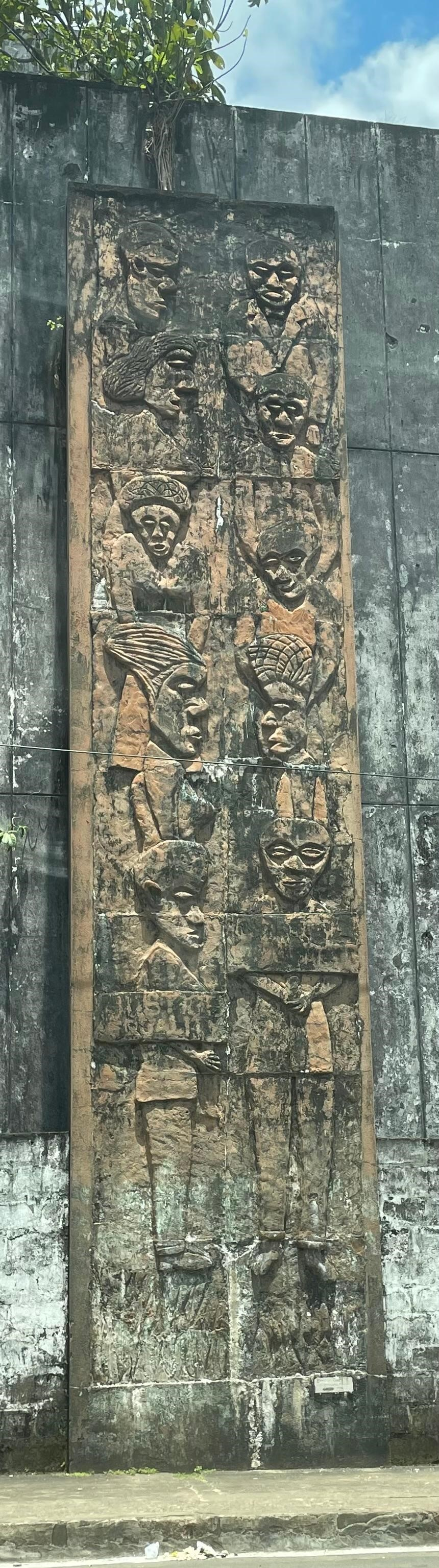
One of several panels by Liberian sculptor Vahnjah Richards.

The Edward J. Roye Building is a wrecked skyscraper on Ashmun Street in the commercial district of Monrovia, the capital city of Liberia. It was named the "E.J. Roye Memorial Building" after the country's fifth President Edward James Roye in 1964 by President William Tubman. The building was designed by Liberian architect Winston Richards to function as the True Whig Party headquarters. It was completed in 1965. It is one of the most prominent buildings in the city. In the building's earlier years, it included a grand auditorium, and before the 1980 coup d'état, it hosted government meetings such as sessions of the Legislature in 1975, as well as non-governmental conventions such as the Liberian Federation of Trade Unions in 1977. It sits in the heart of the city's pre-coup commercial district, near locations such as the former offices of the American Colonization Society.

Considering that the Party had become defunct following the 1980 coup, the General Services Agency appropriated the building in 2011, and in view of the building's ruined state, the building was closed for construction in late 2013. The action provoked anger among the leaders of the rump TWP, who considered their party still to be the owners of the building and filed suit to have themselves declared the rightful owners and to have government officials enjoined from further possession of or construction at the property. In November 2023, the ECOWAS Court ruled in favor of the government, stating that it did not violate the property rights of True Whig Party as stipulated by Article 14 of the African Charter on Human and Peoples' Rights.
