= Emmanuel Amoroso =

Trinidadian veterinary embryologist and endocrinologist (1901–1982)

Emmanuel Amoroso CBE FRCS FRCOG FRS
- Born: Emmanuel Ciprian Amoroso; 16 September 1901; Woodbrook, Port of Spain, Trinidad and Tobago, West Indies
- Died: 30 October 1982 (aged 81); Leeds, England, United Kingdom
- Other name: E. C. Amoroso
- Education: Saint Mary's College; University College Dublin
- Occupations: veterinary embryologist and endocrinologist
- Awards: FRS 1957; FRCS by election 1960; FRCOG 1965; FRCP 1966; CBE 1969; FRCPath 1973; Trinity Cross 1977
- Scientific career
- Fields: Reproductive physiology and developmental biology
- Workplaces: Royal Veterinary College; University College London

Emmanuel Ciprian Amoroso (16 September 1901 – 30 October 1982), was a Trinidadian reproductive physiologist and developmental biologist with an interest in placenta physiology. Initially studying medicine in Ireland in the 1920s, he was subsequently based in Britain for the rest of his life. He was the first person from the West Indies to be elected as a Fellow of the Royal Society, in 1957, and he had the distinction of being a Fellow of four of the Royal Colleges: Surgeons in 1960, Obstetricians and Gynaecologists in 1965, Physicians in 1966, and Pathologists in 1973.

== Early life and education ==
Emmanuel Ciprian Amoroso was born on 16 September 1901 in Woodbrook, Port of Spain, Trinidad and Tobago, one of 12 siblings in a Catholic family; the third eldest child, he had seven brothers and two sisters. His father, Thomas Amoroso, was a bookkeeper who later owned estates dealing mainly in cocoa, and his mother Juliana Centeno was of Venezuelan (Spanish) descent. Amoroso began his formal education in St. Thomas' Preparatory School, and went on to Saint Mary's College in 1913. In 1917, he came first in Saint Mary's College in the Junior Cambridge Certificate, but did not gain a scholarship. He left school early due to sight loss as a result of typhoid fever, and taught for a short period in Saint Mary's College after partially recovering his sight.

In 1922, aged 21, Amoroso went to Dublin, Ireland, and enrolled at University College Dublin (UCD) to study medicine, initially supporting himself by selling newspapers outside the main railway station. At UCD, he received an array of student awards and scholarships, with prizes in botany, zoology, chemistry and physics (1923), anatomy and physiology (1925), pathology, pharmacology, materia medica and therapeutics (1927), and medicine, obstetrics, and the John McArdle Medal in surgery (1929). While still studying he gave lectures in anatomy, in which subject he earned a BSc with honours in 1926. In 1929 he graduated MB BCh BAO with first-class honours, achieving the highest marks ever attained in the final medical exam (while also doing some amateur boxing), after which he completed his surgical internship at the now defunct Jervis Street Hospital in Dublin.

== Career ==
In December 1929, Amoroso received a scholarship from the National University of Ireland to complete research work on myelination of pigs' cranial nerves. Funded by this "travelling studentship", he went to Germany for a year to study in Albert-Ludwigs University and Kaiser Wilhelm Institut für Zellforschung (Kaiser Wilhelm Institute for Cell Physiology) until 1932. During this time, he learned German, and published his first paper in that language. His fluency in German (an accomplished linguist, he spoke six languages) was helpful with his later work on the placenta, as much of the early research on that topic was done by German aristocrats.

In 1933, Amoroso went to London, where he was demonstrator in embryology and histology at University College London. Also in 1933, he began a PhD, which he received in 1934 for his work on the development of the urogenital system in rabbits. After a chance meeting with Hewlett Johnson, later to be known as the "red dean of Canterbury", Amoroso was told about an opening with the Royal Veterinary College (RVC) for a senior assistant for histology and embryology, and he successfully applied for the position, his appointment taking effect in October 1934. In his early days at the veterinary college, as the first staff member of colour, he was subjected to racism and resentment from some colleagues. He became a lecturer in Histology and Embryology at the RVC in 1935.

For the duration of World War II, the Royal Veterinary College was moved to the campus of the University of Reading. During this period, Amoroso collaborated with several other reproductive biologists. He was a founder member, in 1946, of the Society for Endocrinology; he would go on to become its treasurer in 1956 and eventually chairman from 1961 to 1966. In 1947, he became a fellow of the Zoological Society of London, and the next year he was appointed as professor of physiology at the Royal Veterinary College. In 1957, he was elected a fellow of the Royal Society, the first person from the West Indies to be a Royal Society fellow. Amoroso became professor emeritus at the Royal Veterinary College after retiring in 1968.

Thereafter, he moved from London to Cambridge, living in Cherry Hinton, and in 1969 was appointed visiting scientist at the Agricultural Research Council's Institute of Animal Physiology at Babraham in Cambridgeshire. Additionally, during the 1970s, he often lectured internationally, holding visiting professorships in Australia, Canada, Chile, the US, and Nairobi, Kenya, and in 1973 was appointed Special Professor to the Department of Physiology and Environmental Studies at the University of Nottingham.

== Publications ==
In 1931, Amoroso published his first paper, on the epithelium of the pancreas. As Lord Zuckerman noted: "Then came others on diverse topics. Twenty years passed before he began to focus on the problem of placentation, with which his name will be best remembered. Here his gift of synthesis found full play. He threw new light on the evolutionary adaptation of the placenta for viviparous reproduction, his conclusions being based not just on his own researches and experience as a microanatomist and general biologist, but on his familiarity with the literature in several disciplines." Amoroso's research into the placenta was published in Francis Marshall's Physiology of Reproduction in 1952. He published his last paper at the age of 80, having amassed more than 144 publications.

== Selected awards ==
Amoroso received countless professional honours. As well as being elected FRS in 1957, he was elected Fellow of the Royal College of Surgeons of England in 1960, Fellow of the Royal College of Obstetricians and Gynaecologists in 1965, of the Royal College of Physicians of London in 1966, and of the Royal College of Pathologists in 1973. The Royal College of Veterinary Surgeons made him an honorary associate in 1959 and in 1964 he was awarded the MD of the National University of Ireland.

He was appointed a Commander of the Order of the British Empire (CBE) in the 1969 Birthday Honours, for services to Veterinary Physiology. In 1971, the University of the West Indies, St. Augustine, Trinidad, named him Professor Emeritus with the degree of Doctor of Science honoris causa in recognition of his research and contributions to the development of the field of medicine. He was awarded many other honorary doctorates, including from the National University of Ireland (1963), the University of Chile (1966), the University of Illinois (1967), the University of Nottingham (1970), and the University of Guelph, Ontario (1976). In 1977, the government of Trinidad and Tobago awarded him the nation's highest honour, the Trinity Cross.

In addition, he was awarded the Mary Marshall medal of the Society of Fertility, the Carl Hartman medal of the Society for the Study of Reproduction, and in honour of his 80th birthday was presented with the Dale Medal by the Society for Endocrinology at a symposium on 29 September 1981.

== Personal life and death ==
Amoroso had a failed marriage in 1936, but did not divorce because of his Catholic views. Known universally as "Amo", he was described as having "a great sense of occasion and always added a touch of class to everything he did. The bow tie, the small red rose in the buttonhole, the fine cigar, the charming letter of thanks— they were all part of his personal mystique." Highlighting his style, the Oxford Dictionary of National Biography notes: "He possessed the ability to distil complex arguments and to identify key facts from which he presented a lucid and elegant summary. His mastery of the English language was complete and generations of students were captivated by the literary flair of this man who was slightly larger than life with a touch of flamboyance—cigar, pocket handkerchief, and bow-tie—who referred to himself as an Afro-Saxon." An eloquent public speaker, he had a sense of humour that was "exemplified by an account of an invitation to dinner with a rich widow in New York, with Professors Wislocki and Dempsey, two anatomists who hoped to obtain funds for their research. The lady was carving a turkey when she asked Amo which type of meat he liked. His reply 'breast please' shocked her and she gently advised him that one should refer to white meat or dark meat. On the eve of his return to England, he sent the lady a beautiful orchid, expressing the hope that she would pin it to her white meat in honour of the occasion."

Amoroso died on 30 October 1982, aged 81, at the home of friends in Leeds. For a year before his death, he had been ill with heart disease. A memorial service was held at St Peter's Church, Babraham, on 6 January 1983, for his close friends and colleagues, and a memorial mass in London at the Church of St Anselm and St Cecilia in Kingsway, on 28 February, with an address being given by Lord Zuckerman, representing the Duke of Edinburgh, Patron of the Royal Veterinary College.

== Legacy ==
The Amoroso Award was instituted in his memory and is presented for outstanding contributions to small animal studies by a non-clinical member of university staff. The Amoroso Lecture was established in 1984, by the former Society for the Study of Fertility, as a memorial lecture in honour of Professor Amoroso, and was held annually until 2004. The Emmanuel Ciprian Amoroso Award for Medical Sciences is an honour presented by Trinidad's National Institute for Higher Education, Research, Science and Technology (NIHERST).

Professor Amoroso's papers are held at the Wellcome Library.
