= Minnie Martin Alcindor =

Minnie Martin Alcindor (1879–1961) was a British pan-Africanist and manager of Remi House, a hostel which became "a busy meeting house for lonely Africans" in 1920s London. She was the widow of the Trinidadian-born doctor John Alcindor.

== Life ==
Minnie Amy Clara Martin was born in London. She was the daughter of Louis Martin, a Frenchman, and raised by her mother's family. She trained as a journalist.

In 1911 she married John Alcindor, and was disowned by her family. The pair had three children, John (born 1912), Cyril (born 1914) and Roland, known as Bob (born 1917). She also helped her husband in his medical practice on the Harrow Road in West London. Together with her husband, Minnie Alcindor was also active in the Pan-Africanist movement. She was one of only two white women to serve on the committee of the African Progress Union, which John Alcindor led from 1921 onwards.

After her husband died in 1924, Minnie Alcindor established Remi House, a hostel for African students, in Arundel Gardens. However financial difficulties forced her to close the hostel. She later moved to Canvey Island, where she ran a club, Claremont. The singer Paul Robeson visited the family there. She died in 1961.
