= 1869 Liberian term of office referendum =

- 4 May 1869

Results
Choice	Votes	%
Yes	350	99.43%
No	2	0.57%
Valid votes	352	100.00%
Invalid or blank votes	0	0.00%
Total votes	352	100.00%

A referendum on the length of terms of office was held in Liberia on 4 May 1869. The proposals put forward by Parliament on 29 January 1869 would increase the presidential term from two to four years, increase the term of House of Representatives members from two to four years, and increase the term of office of Senators from four to eight years. President-elect Edward James Roye claimed that the changes were approved and that he would remain in office until 1873. However, the legislature, which oversaw the counting process, declared the proposals to be rejected.

== Results ==
Choice	Votes	%
For	350	99.43
Against	2	0.57
Total	352	100.00
Source: African Elections Database
