= Regina Alcindor =

Seychellois politician

Regina Esparon
- Born: August 9, 1965 (age 60)
- Other names: Regina Alcindor
- Occupation: Politician
- Known for: Politics

Regina Esparon is a member of the National Assembly of Seychelles. A nurse by profession, she is a member of the Seychelles National Party, and was first elected to the Assembly on a proportional basis in 2001. She became the first woman in opposition after the return of multiparty politics to be elected in legislative elections in 2002.

== Political career ==
Esparon joined the opposition party and in 1991 formed part in a group of politicians who fought for the establishment of a multi-party system in 1992, paving the way for general elections in 1993. She became an ardent member of the “Parti Seychellois”, as her party was known at the time.

She quit a well-paid job to work for a lower salary as the coordinator of the opposition Seychelles National Party. “My belief has no price. As a full time politician I was in a better position to help others.”

The cataract in Regina Esparon's eyes vanished on the day she failed to get her long overdue promotion. “Not getting my promotion made me conscious that I was ignorant of the critical mass of women who were suffering like me.”

Esparon believes that she suffered victimisation in her job because she showed sympathy for the opposition party. “Overnight all the valuable work I was doing as a qualified nurse was being questioned.” Alcindor’s source of unhappiness cemented a plan for the happiness of others. “I decided to work for those who needed me most.”

There are nine women ruling party parliamentarians and two women opposition parliamentarians (compared to 19 and 7 men respectively) in the Seychelles parliament.

Esparon made her first public speech for the 1998 general elections on mother’s day. “I was raw, afraid and trembling like a leaf and thought I would be booed from all corners.” Instead, the public rushed towards her to congratulate her. “From that day I decided not to deceive all those who believe in me and who trust me.”

She stood for the 1998 elections but did not win. She said this motivated her “to fight for my children and fight for my country.” She quit her nursing job to go into full time politics for the party now called the Seychelles National Party.

She stood again in the same constituency in December 2002 against two male candidates and won. In an interview before the elections, she said she saw race (the male candidates were white) as being more against her than her sex.

“The first time, I was a new candidate and did not have that much influence on voters.” On the second time around, she said, “after being in politics full time for five years, it was a different campaign.”

=== Views on gender ===
Gender equality is an issue on which Esparon has strong views: “It is not proper that half of the population is not getting fair treatment. Gender equality is important because the world cannot keep on moving with only men ruling. Issues that are not important to men are important to women. Women have the responsibility and the capability to address social issues more than men. Women are fighters. They rebel for a cause and will not stop fighting until they reach their goal. The determination of a woman is stronger than that of a man because she believes in the well being of people in general.”

Esparon believes that the fact that women express emotions makes them better politicians: “Women have gut feelings. They are the guardian of moral values and their voices must count.”

She says for her gender is not something theoretical. Her everyday life is all about gender equality. A mother of three, Esparon is divorced but lives with a partner of 13 years who is very supportive of her political career.

For example, Esparon attended a meeting of the African Women’s Leadership Forum in Accra, and a meeting on gender and NEPAD in Johannesburg in June 2002 hosted by Deputy Speaker Baleka Kgositsile-Mbete.

=== Work in constituency ===
While opposition parties in Seychelles do not always have a smooth ride, Esparon has regular meetings with her caucus group in her constituency. She also represents her constituency at the National Women Organisation Commission of her party where major issues like breast cancer, child pregnancy, and infant mortality are discussed. Together with eleven men and four women she sits on the Executive Committee of the party. “Although women are under-represented we have the same rights and our voices are heard.”

A major constraint voiced by opposition parties in Seychelles is finding venues to meet with constituents. Esparon is adding a room to her house, which will serve as an office for meetings. At the moment she is counting on friends but some are reluctant as not all belong to the same political party. “We will become easy targets of victimization and our children might lose their jobs,” said one female respondent of the focus group of the opposition party. The other three female respondents on the same panel agreed with her.

The male focus group with opposition party supporters said the same thing. The focus groups were carried out in a modest place far from town under a veranda that could hardly sit six persons.

Esparon also does door to door calls in her constituency three times a week to make sure that their problems are solved.

“Contrary to what my opponents says I do not mix issues. I am the Chairperson of two committees of the Parents Teachers Association and I have been doing that for the past twelve years. I am proud to say that I have brought lots of reforms in the school. Parents, teachers and the administrative staff have a better relationship. As the Secretary of my church, I have brought up very positive reforms. I have set up a committee with the young to better understand their problems and their dislike for the church. Now they are on the Eucharistic committee. We sometimes celebrate masses, sing for funerals and weddings. We also do lots of community work together.”

One of Esparon's main concerns is finding proper accommodation for vulnerable groups. She is confident that her negotiations with the Ministry of Land and Habitat will bear fruit.

Both female and male focus groups of the opposition party agreed- as one member of the group put it- “We admire her courage and her commitment. Women in our party are doing a fantastic job and we must give them all the support possible. They are working long hours for us. Having a gender lens is of utmost important in places like hospitals, schools or even in building a house.”

But Esparon has had a tough time in other quarters, including bruising brushes with the media:

The media reported what my opponents said without verification. My private life, the loan on my house, my work at the church and my social work not only became public but they poured scorn on me. My opponents used the most powerful tool, the media to downgrade me. Nobody was spared in my family. I was humiliated in political meetings, in the newspapers and in tracks that were distributed all over the place. I was accused of not paying the loan on my house. I was accused of bringing politics to my church and to the school where my children go. One day I was horrified to find the four tyres of my car slashed. My opponents even said that I was uneducated and they called me ‘bal sarbon’ ‘marsoin’ (sack of coal, black dolphin). The lies were so grotesque that I preferred not to reply. I am a very religious person. I believe in God and my prayers are helping me to surmount all my problems.

Asked why she opted for opposition politics, she notes that for 25 years, one party has governed Seychelles: first under one party rule, now under a multiparty democracy. Either way, she says, “its time for a change.”

== Personal life ==
Esparon is married with three children.

She is the breadwinner in her family. Her partner is a casual worker. "When I am very busy with my political work or during electoral campaign my partner takes complete responsibility for the house. Without his support and that of my mother it would have been difficult for me to fulfil my obligations. I sometimes represent my party on conferences outside Seychelles.”
