= John Archer (British politician) =

British politician

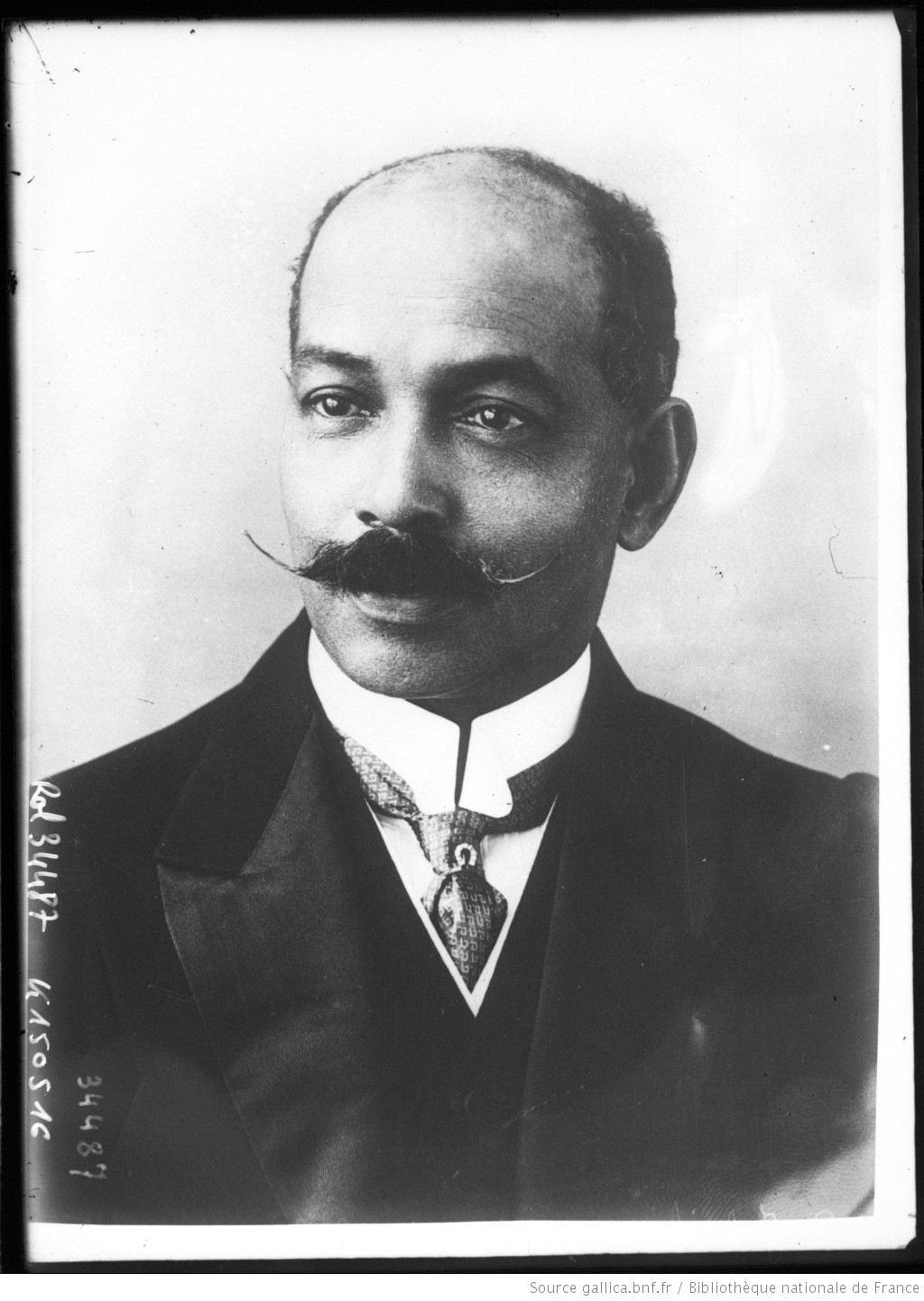
- Born: 8 June 1863; Liverpool, Lancashire, United Kingdom
- Died: 14 July 1932 (aged 69); Battersea, London, United Kingdom
- Occupations: Photographer, politician
- Known for: Mayor of Battersea, Pan-Africanism

John Richard Archer (8 June 1863 – 14 July 1932) was a British politician and political activist. In 1913 he was elected Mayor of Battersea, becoming the first black mayor of a borough in London. He was a notable Pan-Africanist and the founding president of the African Progress Union.

== Life and career ==
Archer was born in Liverpool, Lancashire to Richard Archer, from Barbados, and Mary Theresa Burns, from Ireland. For years he travelled the world as a seaman, living for periods in the US and Canada. He married Bertha, a black Canadian, and in the 1890s, returned with her to England, settling in Battersea while in his thirties. He started to study medicine but supported himself by a small photographic studio.

Archer became involved in local politics; he was a supporter of the radical Liberal John Burns and friendly with London radicals. In 1906 he was elected as a Progressive (Liberal) to Battersea Borough Council for Latchmere ward; at the same time, West Indian Henry Sylvester Williams won in Marylebone. Archer successfully campaigned for a minimum wage of 32 shillings a week for council workers but lost his seat in 1909; he was re-elected in 1912.

In 1913, Archer was nominated for the position of mayor (at that time a position implying that he was the political leader of the Battersea council, rather than the ceremonial role common in England from the 1920s). There were negative and racist aspects to the campaign, with allegations that he did not have British nationality. He won by 40 votes to 39 among his fellow councillors, and gave a notable victory speech:

"My election tonight means a new era. You have made history tonight. For the first time in the history of the English nation a man of colour has been elected as mayor of an English borough.

"That will go forth to the coloured nations of the world and they will look to Battersea and say Battersea has done many things in the past, but the greatest thing it has done has been to show that it has no racial prejudice and that it recognises a man for the work he has done."

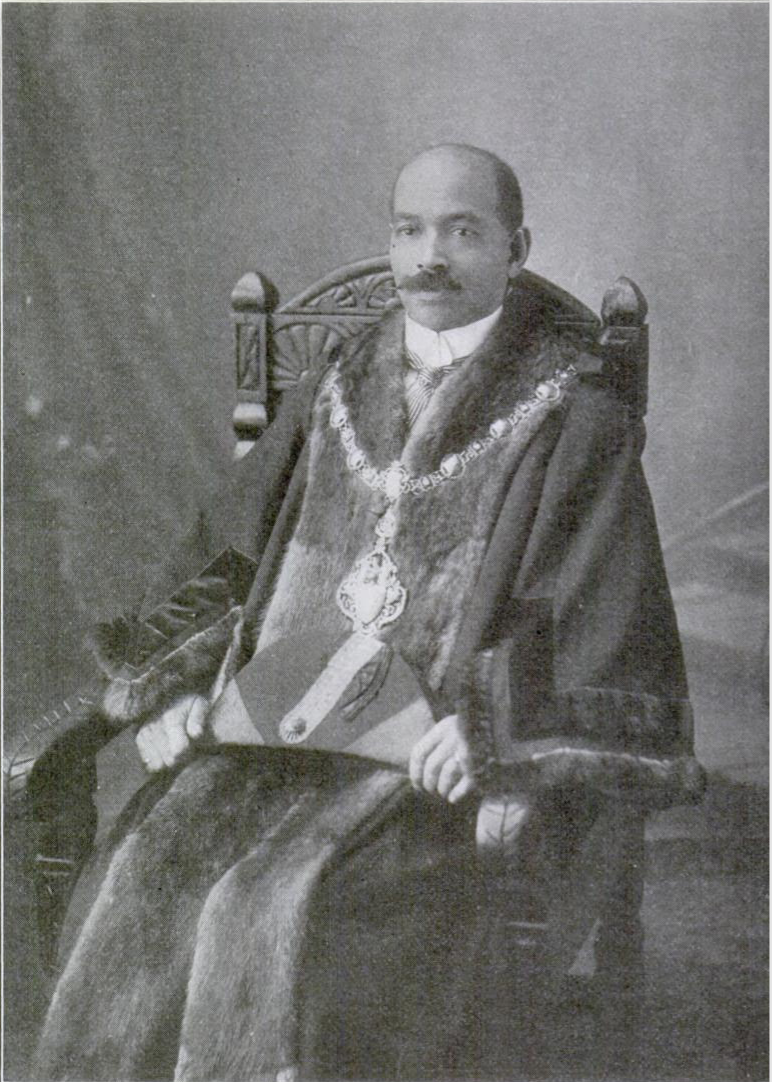
Archer in his mayoral robes, published in The Crisis, March 1914

His success was reported in the US journal The Crisis in January 1914. It was published by the recently formed National Association for the Advancement of Colored People (NAACP).

Archer moved to the left during his years in Battersea and in 1919 was re-elected to the council as a Labour representative. In 1918 he had been elected as the first president of the African Progress Union, working for "advanced African ideas in liberal education". In 1919 he was a British delegate to the Pan-African Congress in Paris and two years later, chaired the Pan-African Congress in London.

In 1922, Archer gave up his council seat to act as Labour Party election agent for Shapurji Saklatvala, a Communist Party activist standing for parliament in North Battersea. He convinced the Labour Party to endorse Saklatvala, who was duly elected – one of the first Indian MPs in Britain. He and Saklatvala continued to work together, winning again in 1924 until the Communist and Labour parties split fully. In the 1929 general election, Archer was agent for the official Labour candidate, who beat Saklatvala.

Archer served as a governor of Battersea Polytechnic, president of the Nine Elms Swimming Club, chair of the Whitley Council Staff Committee, and a member of the Wandsworth Board of Guardians.

He was again elected in 1931, for the Nine Elms ward. At the time of his death in 1932, he was deputy leader of Battersea Council. He died on 14 July 1932, a few weeks after his 69th birthday. His funeral was held at the Church of Our Lady of Carmel in Battersea Park Road on 19 July. He was buried in the council cemetery at Morden.

Jane Roberts, widow of the former president of Liberia Joseph Jenkins Roberts, had travelled to England late in life and met the Archer couple. She lived with Archer and his wife until her death in 1914, aged 95.

Archer had been thought to be the first black man to be elected as a mayor in Britain. But, the American Negro Year Book 1914, in reporting Archer's election, also reported that

In 1904, Mr. Allen Glaser Minns [sic], a colored man from the West Indies, was elected mayor of the borough of Thetford, Norfolk.

== Legacy ==
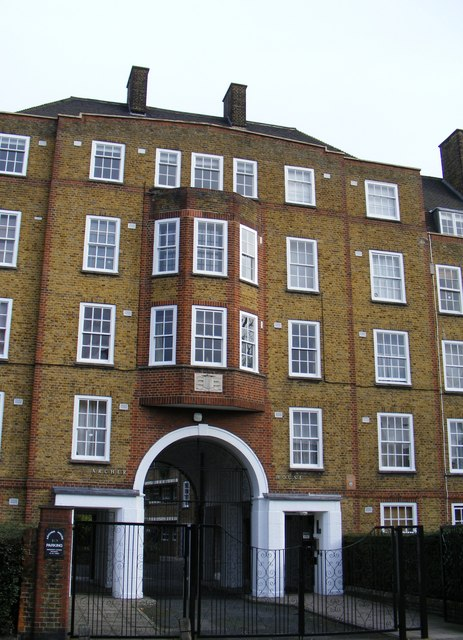
Entrance of Archer House in Battersea Village

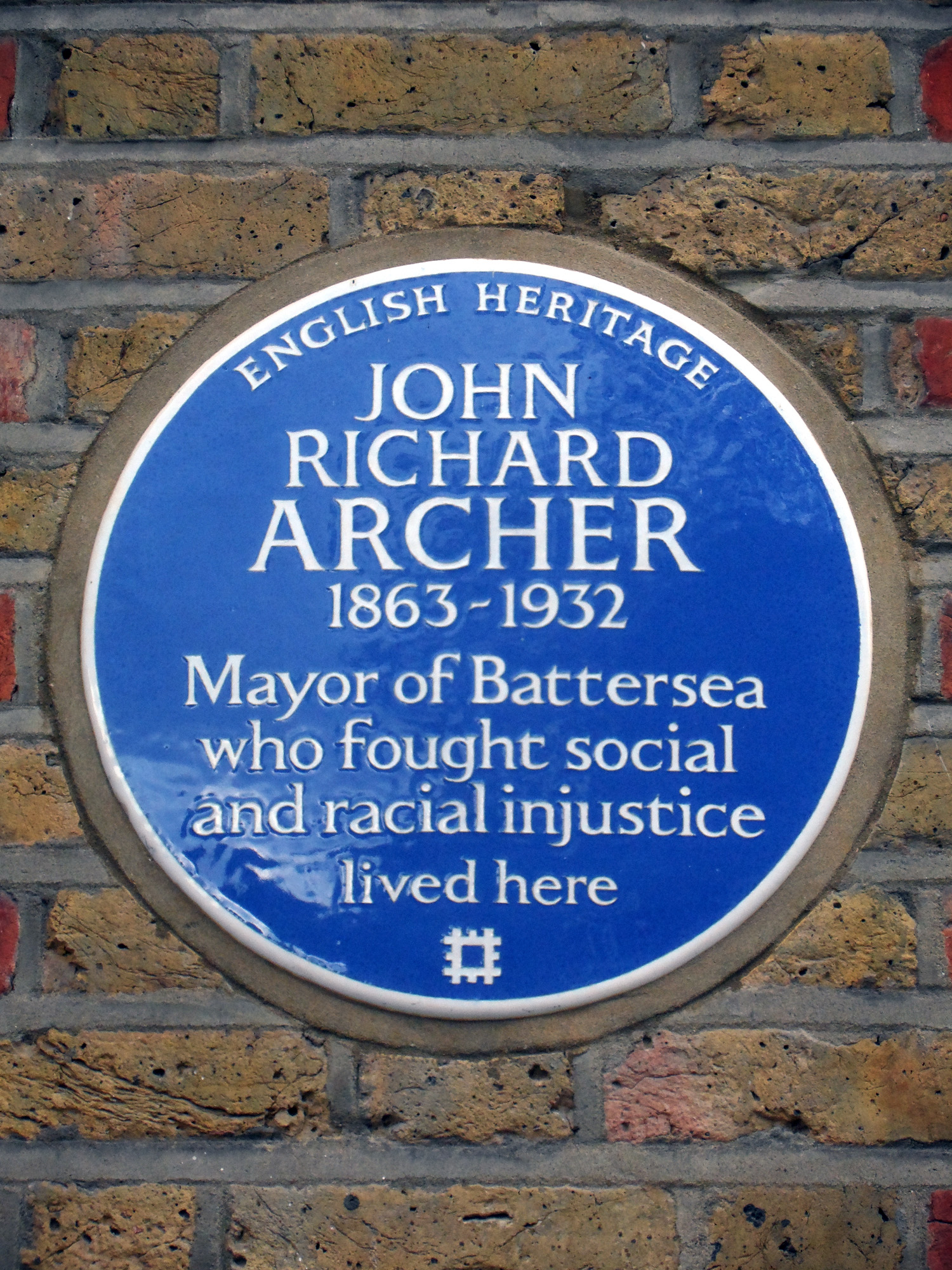
Blue plaque erected in 2013 by English Heritage at 55 Brynmaer Road, Battersea

Archer House, part of the Battersea Village estate, was named after Archer upon construction in the 1930s. In 1986 John Archer School was formed from the merger of Wandsworth School and Spencer Park School but it closed in 1991. There is a John Archer Way in Wandsworth and in Liverpool, a John Archer Hall.

In 2004, John Archer was chosen for the "100 Great Black Britons" list, coming 72nd in a public vote.

In 2010, Archer was commemorated with a blue plaque from the Nubian Jak Community Trust.

In April 2013 Archer was one of six people selected by Royal Mail for the "Great Britons" commemorative postage stamp issue.

In November 2013 Archer was honoured by English Heritage with a blue plaque at his former home, 55 Brynmaer Road, Battersea.

In March 2018 the Ark Academy Network renamed High View Primary school in Battersea as Ark John Archer Academy.

Civic offices
Preceded by Thomas Brogan	Mayor of Battersea; 1913–1914	Succeeded by Thomas William Simmons
