= 1870 Liberian constitutional referendum =

A referendum on the length of terms of office was held in Liberia on 3 May 1870. After the political dispute that had followed the disputed result of a similar referendum the previous year, the Legislature agreed to resubmit the proposal to the electorate. President Edward James Roye had the votes counted and declared that the referendum had passed. The legislature, the entity legally responsible for counting the votes, declared that the proposal has not passed because an illegitimate officer - the President - had counted the votes and thus the referendum had failed.
