= Clement Ligoure =

Trinidadian doctor in Canada (1887–1922)

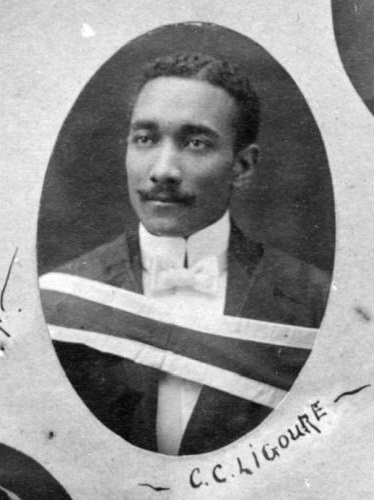
- Ligoure in 1913
- Born: 13 October 1887; San Fernando, Trinidad, British West Indies
- Died: 23 May 1922 (aged 34); Port of Spain, Colony of Trinidad and Tobago, British West Indies
- Education: Queen's University
- Occupation: Doctor of Medicine
- Spouse: Vivian E. Haynes

Clement Courtenay Ligoure (13 October 1887 – 23 May 1922) was a Trinidadian doctor and newspaper publisher who was the first [licensed]* Black physician to practise in Nova Scotia, Canada. *[The first Black man to practise medicine in the province may have been a North Sydney, Cape Breton doctor, Adam Lloyd Bayley (1845–1913), originally from Jamaica. However, despite several documented references as to his professional standing, Dr. Bayley’s name is not listed in any of the Nova Scotia Medical Registers and, by his own admission, practiced without a licence.] Dr. Ligoure is also noted for treating hundreds of victims of the Halifax Explosion from his home clinic as well as being an editor and publisher of The Atlantic Advocate newspaper.

== Early life and education ==
Born in San Fernando, Trinidad and Tobago, he was the son of Clement François and Amanda M. (née) Crooke. His father worked for the Supreme Court of Trinidad and Tobago.

In April 1906 at age 18, Clement Ligoure immigrated to the United States. That same year, he started studies at Queen's University in Ontario, Canada. At the university, he earned a Bachelor of Medicine Degree in 1914 and a Doctor of Medicine degree in 1916.

== Career ==
=== Military and early medical work ===
With World War I underway, Dr. Ligoure enlisted in the Canadian military and ended up travelling to Halifax, Nova Scotia—arriving in 1916, after receiving his final degree. His aim was to become Medical Officer of the No. 2 Construction Battalion, made up of Black recruits. However, a clerical error discovered in May 1916, concerning Ligoure's application to the Nova Scotia Medical Board, resulted in his failing to receive a license. However, the matter was resolved within a couple of weeks after which he received his license to practise medicine in Nova Scotia. In September, the No. 2 Battalion’s commander, Lieutenant Colonel Daniel H. Sutherland wrote a strong recommendation of Dr. Ligoure for the position of supernumerary lieutenant. However, in late February 1917, the doctor's appointment was cancelled without any consideration for the M.O. position. The commission instead went to a white physician from Tatamagouche, Dr. Dan Murray. The British War Office, ergo the Canadian Department of Militias and Defence, simply refused to see beyond the colour bar. Nevertheless, Dr. Ligoure spent the next seven months raising money and recruiting for the battalion.

Despite being a licensed physician, Ligoure was denied hospital privileges in Halifax. Still, he served as medical officer for the mostly Black Pullman porters working for the Canadian Government Railways (C.G.R.) later, the Canadian National Railway (C.N.R.). His fifteen-person clinic was located in his house and named the Amanda Private Hospital for his mother.

=== Halifax Explosion ===
After the Halifax Explosion on 6 December 1917, Ligoure worked long hours to treat blast victims. Some of the patients that filled his clinic had been unable to get medical help elsewhere. In a statement to Dr. Archibald MacMechan, Ligoure conveyed that he worked day and night:

In spite of the warning of a second explosion, he worked steadily till 8 p.m. ... Seven people spent the night in his office, laid upon blankets. On December 7th, 8th and 9th, he worked steadily both night and day, doing outside work at night.

At first his only support was from his housekeeper, Miss Bessie Waith, and his boarder, H.D. Nicholas, a Pullman porter. On 10 December, Ligoure requested assistance from City Hall and received two nurses to come with him to establish an "official dressing station" for changing and applying bandages. Eventually, he was leading ten nurses, six other women and four soldiers (one of whom was a physician).

His work continued to 28 December, with records indicating nearly 200 patients were helped each day. His patients were almost all White. According to archival records, patients were not charged. This work has led him to be recognized as a "local hero" and "unsung hero".

=== The Atlantic Advocate newspaper ===
Ligoure served as the editor and publisher of The Atlantic Advocate, originally founded by Wilfred Adolphus DeCosta. Publication took place in the home he had purchased in 1917 at 166 North Street. It was the first newspaper in Nova Scotia owned and published by Black Canadians. The newspaper ran from 1915 to 1917 and its masthead read: "Devoted to the interests of colored people." Following the closure of The Atlantic Advocate, Dr. Ligoure became an active spokesman for the Universal Negro Improvement Association and African Communities League (UNIA-ACL), the first major Black social movement of the 20th century. The organization was founded in Jamaica in 1914 by Marcus Garvey and several associates and established its headquarters in Harlem by 1916. Dr. Ligoure was responsible for giving instructions to the Dominica Brotherhood Union so to form a chapter in Roseau. The doctor gave a rousing speech to the Brotherhood in January 1920. The evening’s proceedings were recorded in the 29 January edition of the Dominica Guardian.

== Death and legacy ==
In 1919, Dr. Ligoure came down with an unspecified illness which eventually forced him to close down his Halifax practice. He returned to Port of Spain in June of 1921. Almost a year later, during a visit with his brother Clarence in Tobago, Dr. Ligoure contracted malignant malaria. He was transported to the Colonial Hospital in Port of Spain, Trinidad, where he died at 34 years of age on 23 May 1922.

David Woods' play Extraordinary Acts, in part, dramatized Ligoure's role in the Halifax Explosion. It was scheduled to be staged in 2020, but was delayed due to the COVID-19 pandemic.

An inaugural "Dr. Clement Ligoure Award" was given in 2021 by the Doctors Nova Scotia organization to Nova Scotia's Chief Medical Officer of Health. It is a non-annual prize given to a physician for handling a medical crisis in Nova Scotia.

In Halifax, the former house of Ligoure (of which only a part still stands) was given heritage status on 24 January 2023. The decision by Halifax's regional council followed lobbying efforts by the Friends of Halifax Common and several notable Black community members. The house is listed at 5812-14 North Street, and was built in 1892.

A new biography by Joel Zemel has been released as of July 2024. The book is entitled Dr. Clement Courtenay Ligoure: Publishing, Social Advocacy and the 1917 Halifax Disaster. The volume also provides new information about Dr. Ligoure’s early life, details of his involvement as a recruiter for the No. 2 Construction Battalion, his work for the Universal Negro Improvement Association and African Communities League, and what happened to him after he closed down his medical practice and left Halifax for good.
