= Abayomi Wilfrid Karnga =

Liberian politician and judge

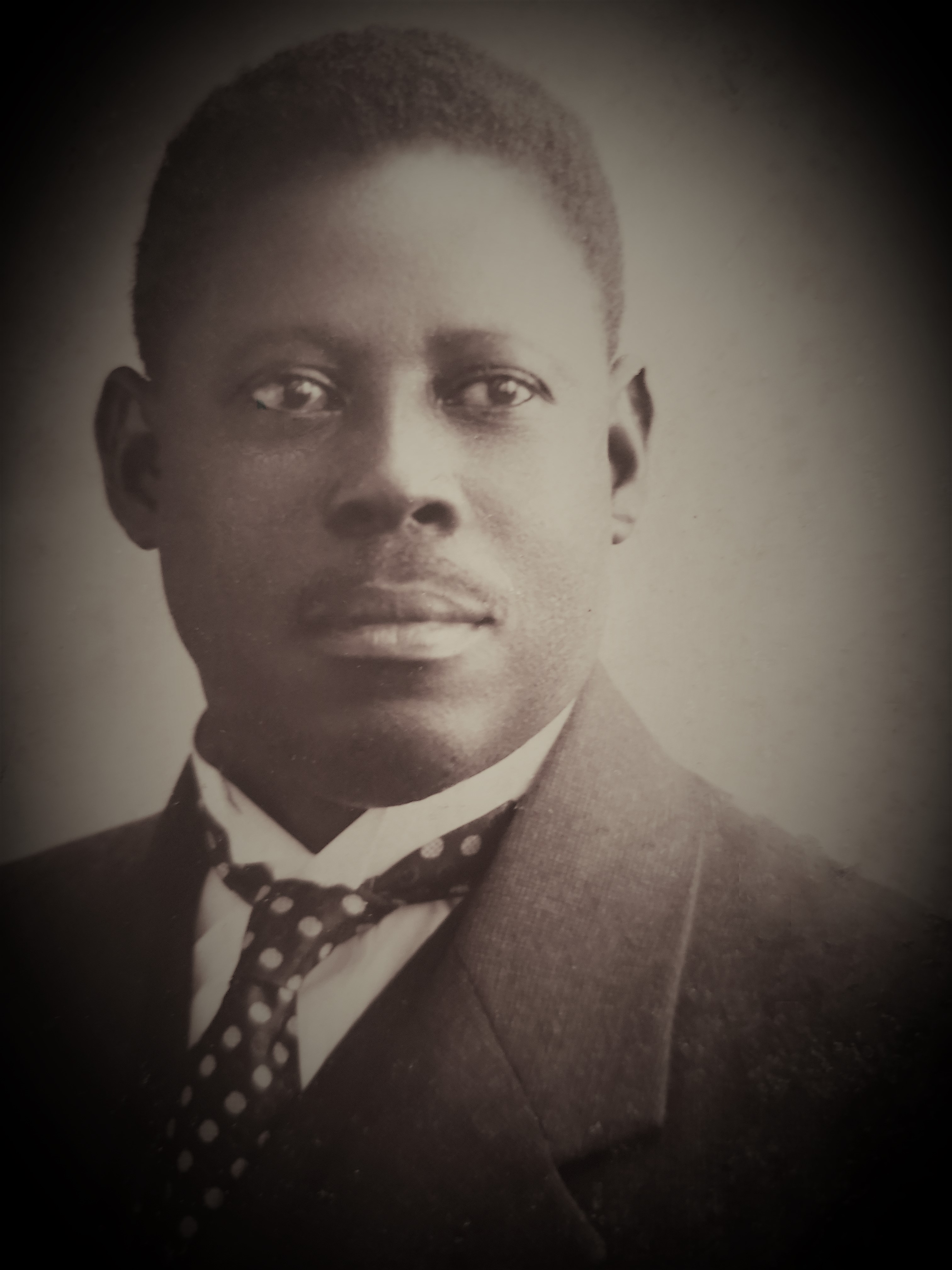
- Born: November 29, 1882; Tallah, Grand Cape Mount County, Liberia
- Died: November 22, 1952 (aged 69); Monrovia, Liberia
- Notable work: The Negro Republic on West Africa (1909); History of Liberia (1926); History of the Black Race (1944)
- Spouse: Isabella Hodge Karnga
- Children: Abayomi, Tautla, Olivia, Rushu, Isabel and Makeda

Abayomi Wilfrid Karnga (29 November 1882 – 22 November 1952) was a Liberian historian, educator, politician, counselor at law, and statesman who served as an Associate Justice of the Supreme Court of the Republic of Liberia. Born at the settlement of Tallah in the northwestern section of Liberia in Grand Cape Mount County, Karnga began a long career in government service which included service as Postmaster General and General Secretary of the True Whig Party, the Liberian political party that was in power from 1869 to 1980.

== Early life and education ==
Karnga was born in 1882 at the settlement of Tallah in the northwestern section of Liberia, Grand Cape Mount County. His parents, who were recaptive Africans from the Congo region, landed in Liberia in 1859 after being taken off a slave ship by the American slave squadron. His father, Orangge (Prince of Solongo, Belgian Congo), was a member of the Kongo tribal subgroup Solongo, from the Mbamba region. His grandmother, Kambi, also from the Mbamba region, held the title Mfumu Ankento (Queen of Solongo kia Mbamba).

In 1888, the Congo Free State was established by Henry Morton Stanley under the leadership of King Leopold II of Belgium. Many recaptive Africans felt it safe to return home. Karnga’s father, Orangge, decided to visit the Congo, the country of his birth. Karnga wrote about the trip saying that in the year 1888, when he was a little boy, his father took him on a visit to the Congo. Karnga’s father also took his wife Sarah, and daughter Elizabeth along. The family embarked from Monrovia on the steam ship Ambriz, a Belgian merchant ship, which took one month on the voyage to get to Boma. Karnga met his grandmother, Kambi, who was still alive. The family intended to remain in the Congo, but due to Karnga's serious illness a few months after their arrival, a decision was made to return to Liberia. Orangge secured tickets for his family to return home on the British merchant ship Benue after being in the Congo for a year. The ship was quarantined in Freetown and not permitted to land in Liberia. Unfortunately, Elizabeth died on the way. Karnga's mother Sarah died immediately upon landing in Freetown, and was buried at Kissi. In 1889, after being in Freetown for a month, Karnga and Orangge returned to Liberia on the steam ship Biafra.

On his return to Tallah, Karnga entered the St John's Protestant Episcopal Mission School located in the nearby town of Robertsport. Upon completion of his studies there, he entered Liberia College in the capital city of Monrovia. Among Karnga's classmates who graduated with him in 1903 were Edwin Barclay, later President of Liberia, and Louis Arthur Grimes, later Chief Justice of the Supreme Court of Liberia.

== Marriage and Family ==
Karnga married Isabella Hodge, a Liberian from Bigtown, Cape Palmas, Maryland County, on June 15, 1912. She was a member of the Grebo tribe. Karnga and Isabella had six children together: Abayomi, Tautla, Olivia, Rushu, Isabel and Makeda.

== Career ==
Karnga began a long career in government service starting in 1909. From 1909 to 1911, Karnga was Postmaster for Monrovia. In May 1911, he was elected to the thirty-second legislature as a representative from Grand Cape Mount County. He served until the completion of his term in 1915. In that same year, he was a member of the Anglo-Liberian Boundary Commission which made the final settlement of Liberia's border with Sierra Leone. He was admitted as Counsellor at Law and member of the Supreme Court Bar in 1914 and also served as professor of law at Liberia College the same year.

Karnga held the position of Acting Attorney General from 1921 to 1922, and as Assistant Secretary of State from 1922 to 1923. He later joined the cabinet of President Charles D. B. King where he served as Postmaster General of Liberia until 1926. In 1928, President King appointed Karnga to the bench of the Supreme Court as an Associate Justice. He held the position until 1933 when he stepped down. During the period from 1930 to 1934, Karnga served for a time as Secretary of the True Whig Party.

In his later years, Karnga held several minor governmental posts. In 1940, he was appointed to an Import-Export Corporation Board to assist in controlling Liberia's wartime trade. In 1947, he was appointed to a commission to expropriate land for future sites of the capitol and University of Liberia, as part of the centennial activities.

Karnga's last major activity was the annual Independence Day address on Liberia’s centennial as a republic. His selection as speaker was in part due to Karnga being a well-known writer and historian. The selection also signified the full equality and acceptance of Liberian settlers, which had not been accorded to recaptured Africans and their offspring.

On November 22, 1952, Abayomi Wilfrid Karnga died in Monrovia.

== Writings ==
Abayomi Wilfrid Karnga wrote Liberian history from a personal conviction. In the preface of an early work, he wrote that Liberia's national ideals could not be implanted in the minds and hearts of all of its citizens by the constant "inculcation" into them of the thoughts and customs of other peoples to the sad neglect of their own. He stated that Liberia's governing people owed to themselves the duty to know themselves and to have a thorough knowledge of the customs and methods of government which long existed among their forefathers. With such knowledge, Karnga wrote, Liberia’s leaders could then hope to govern with less misunderstanding and domestic trouble.

== Works ==
Prince Jeenah. (1904). Cape Palmas.

The negro republic on West Africa. (1909). Monrovia, Liberia: College of West Africa Press.

The postal laws of Liberia, as collected from the statutes and acts of the legislature of Liberia under the direction of Hon. Isaac Moort, Postmaster General. By honorable review and approved by Hon. S. A. Ross, Attorney General. (1912). Monrovia: Government Printing Office.

Orations. Monrovia: Government Printing Office. (1911).

Liberia official postal guide. By Postmaster General of Liberia. Monrovia: The Montserrado Printing & Publishing Company. (1923).

Liberia before the new world. London: F. I. Phillips. (1923).

The new Liberia and other orations. Grand Cape Mount: Douglas Muir. (1925).

History of Liberia. Liverpool: D.N Tyte & Co. (1926).

History of the black race. (1944).

Topics from Liberian geography. Monrovia. (1933).

The native laws and customs. Monrovia. (1935).

A guide to our criminal and civil procedure. Monrovia, Liberia, College of West Africa Press. (1914).

Index to the statutes of the Republic of Liberia. (1858-1909).

History of constitutional law. (n.d)
