= African Progress Union =

The African Progress Union (APU) was founded in London in 1918 as "an Association of Africans from various parts of Africa, the West Indies, British Guiana, Honduras and America, representing advanced African ideas in liberal education". The first president was John Archer. He was succeeded in 1921 by John Alcindor. Others involved as founders included John Eldred Taylor, Thomas Horatio Jackson and Dusé Mohamed Ali.

In 1919, the Union briefly merged with the Society of Peoples of African Origin (SPAO), which had been founded in 1918. A short-term change of name to the Society of African Peoples was followed by the founder of the SPAO, Felix Hercules, becoming Secretary of the Union. Also in 1919 the APU paid for Edward Theophilus Nelson as defence counsel in the Liverpool trial of 15 black men, in the aftermath of racially motivated communal violence.

Alcindor died in 1924; he was succeeded by Kwamina Tandoh. For some years he worked closely with John Barbour-James. The Union's 1925 meeting was attended by Ethel Snowden and Gordon Guggisberg. The APU was active until 1927.
