= William Hackwood =

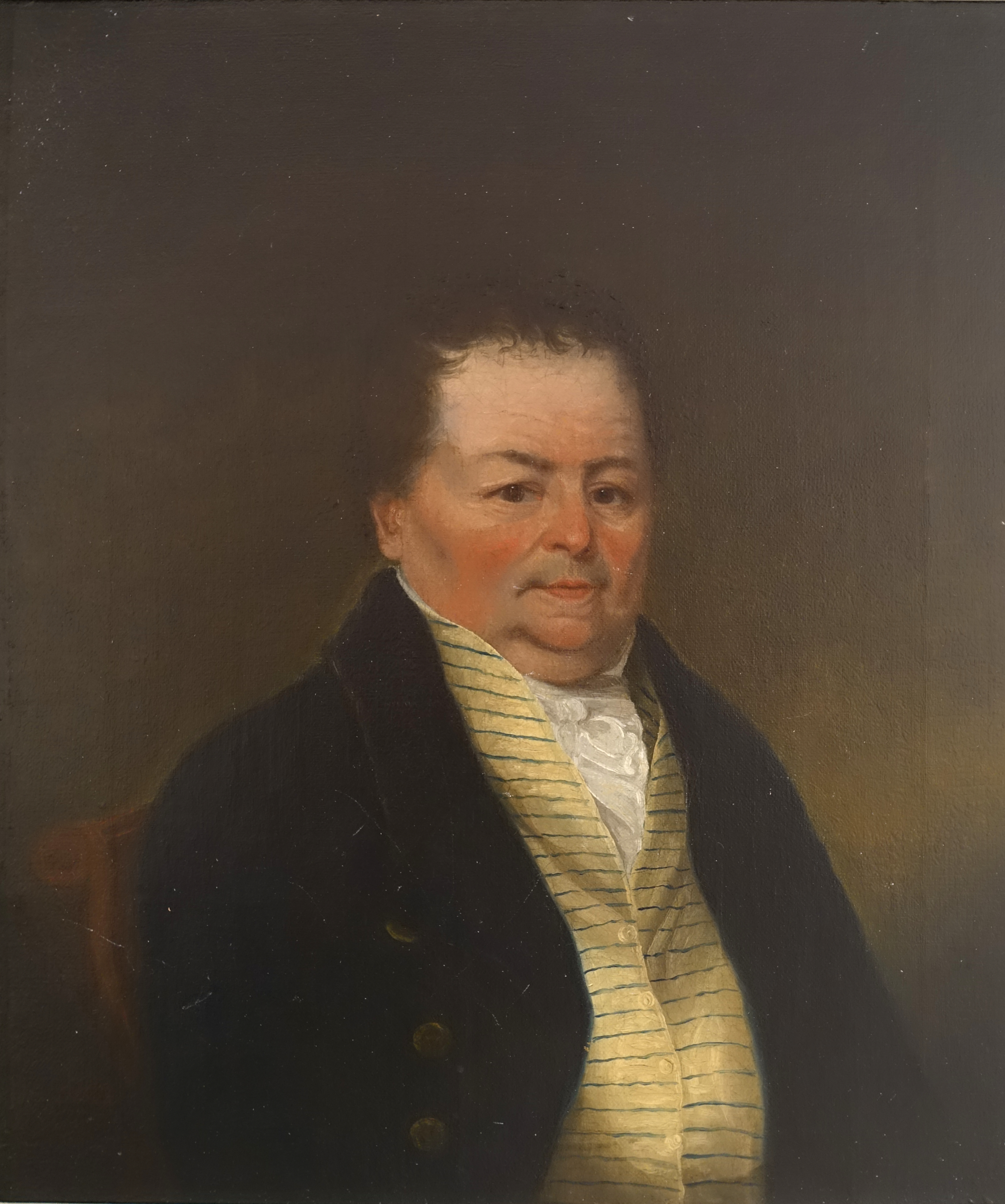
William Hackwood, c. 1820

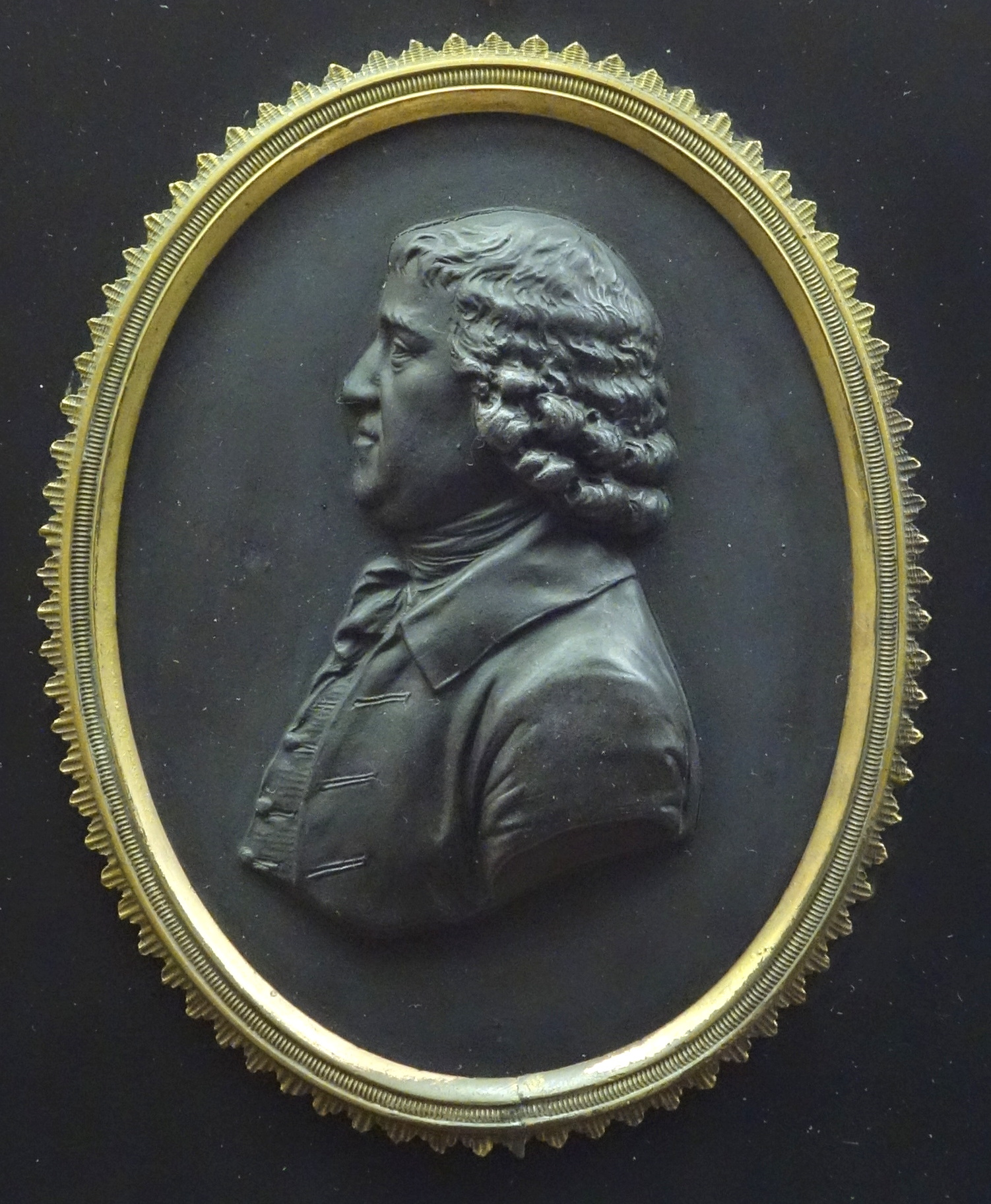
Portrait medallion of Josiah Wedgwood, modelled by William Hackwood in 1782-1783

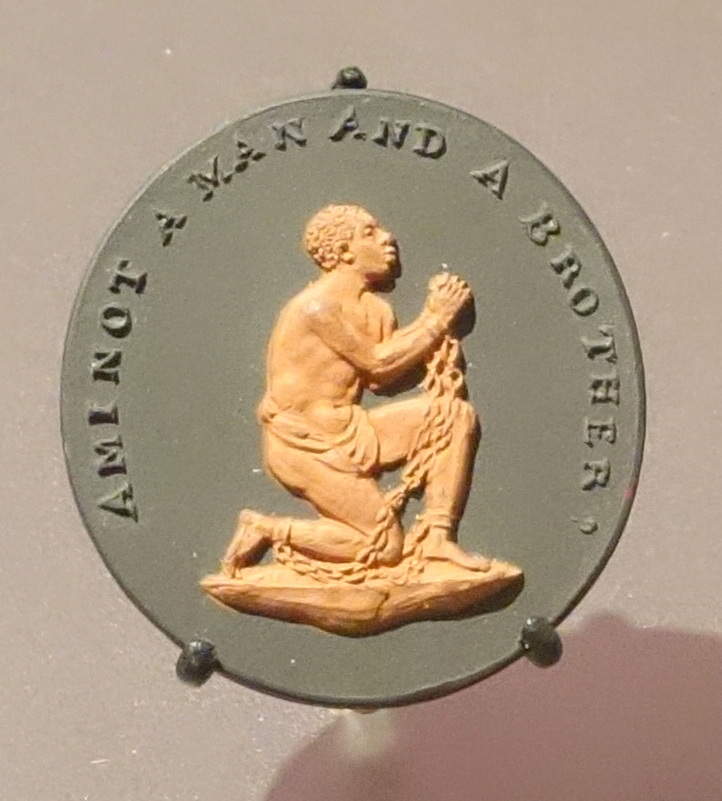
Am I Not a Man and a Brother?

William Hackwood (c. 1757–1839) was a modeller for Wedgwood from 1769 until 1832. He began work in the Etruria factory as an "ingenious boy", in Josiah Wedgwood's phrase, where he was "... of the greatest value and consequence in finishing fine small work." In time, he became head of ornamental art for the firm. He modelled many of Wedgwood's 18th-century portrait medallions, including those of Wedgwood himself, George III, and Queen Charlotte. His portraits of David Garrick and Shakespeare were signed but most were not. His work for the 18th-century abolitionist movement, Am I Not a Man and a Brother (circa 1787), perhaps to a design by Wedgwood himself, was widely distributed by the anti-slavery movement.

A surviving contract between Josiah Wedgwood and William Hackwood, dated November 1777, specifies that Hackwood's basic wage was to be £1 11s 6d. per week and that his house was to be rent-free. Additional payments were made on a per-piece basis.
