= 1847 in Liberia =

- Decades: 1820s; 1830s; 1840s; 1850s; 1860s
- See also: Other events of 1847; Timeline of Liberian history

The following lists events that happened during 1847 in Liberia.

== Events ==
=== July ===
- July 5 – The constitutional convention, which would produce the 1847 Liberian constitution as well as the Liberian Declaration of Independence, first convenes.
- July 26 – The Liberian Declaration of Independence is approved, founding the Republic of Liberia as an independent nation.
- July 28 – The Liberian constitution is approved by the constitutional convention.

=== August ===
- August 24 – The flag of Liberia, created by a committee of Liberian women headed by Susannah Elizabeth Lewis, is adopted.

=== September ===
- September 27 – Liberian constitution is approved by voters in the constitutional referendum.

=== October ===
- October 5 – Liberian general election, 1847

== Deaths ==
- Full date unknown – John B. Gripon, signatory of the Liberian Declaration of Independence, (b. 1809 in the United States)
