= 1840 Liberian legislative election =

Legislative elections were held in Liberia on 1 December 1840.

== Background ==
A new constitution was adopted by the American Colonization Society on 5 January 1839. It provided for a Council with six elected members representing Caldwell, Millsburg, Monrovia and New Georgia and four to represent Bassa Cove, Bexley, Edina and Marshall. All men over the age of 20 were given the right to vote.

Prior to the elections, supporters of John Seys, a missionary who was being sued by the colonial administration over failure to pay import duty, formed an Anti-Administration movement to field candidates against the ruling group. This was the first instance of organised politics in the territory, as previously candidates had run as individuals.

== Results ==
The Anti-Administration group won three of the 11 seats in the Commonwealth Council, with Administration group candidates won six seats and post of Lieutenant-Governor. However, there were accusations of electoral fraud against Seys' group, with claims by the American Colonization Society that workers at his saw mill and sugar plantation had all voted for candidates supporting him confirmed by others including Francis Burns.

=== Elected members ===
Member	Group
Joseph Jenkins Roberts (Lieutenant Governor)	Administration
James Brown	Administration
L. Ciples	Administration
John B. Gripon	Anti-Administration
John Hanson	Administration
Nathaniel Harris	Administration
Daniel Johnston	Anti-Administration
Louis Sheridan	Administration
H. Teage	Administration
Beverly R. Wilson	Anti-Administration
John Woodland	Administration
Source: Huberich
