= Clinton Caldwell Boone =

Baptist minister

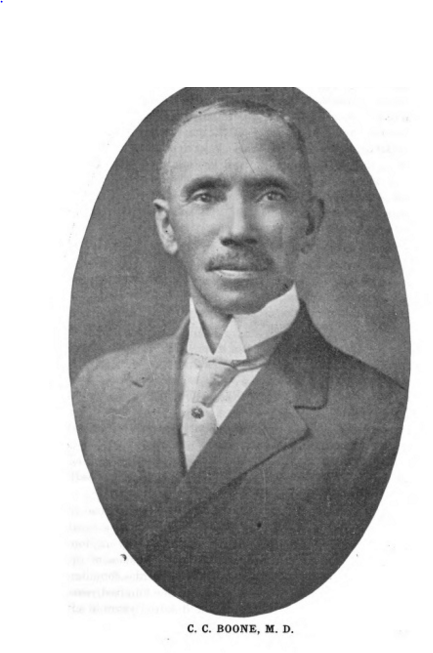
- Evangelist, Physician, Dentist, Educator
- Born: 9 May 1872; Hertford County, North Carolina
- Died: 1939 (aged 66–67)
- Spouse(s): Eva Roberta Coles, Rachel Allen Tharps
- Children: Rachel Boone Keith

Clinton Caldwell Boone (9 May 1872 –1939) was an African-American Baptist minister, physician, dentist, and medical missionary who served in the Congo Free State and Liberia. The son of Rev. Lemuel Washington Boone and Charlotte (Chavis) Boone of Hertford County, North Carolina, he played an important role in Africa as a missionary for the Lott Carey Foreign Mission Convention and the American Baptist Missionary Union, now American Baptist International Ministries.

He married shortly before traveling to the Congo in 1901 as a missionary. His first wife and their infant child died there. After Boone returned to the United States in 1906 and studied to earn his medical degree, he was assigned to Liberia as a medical missionary. While on furlough in the US in 1919, the widower married again. He and his second wife traveled in 1920 to serve in Monrovia, Liberia, and their two children were born there. The family returned to the US permanently in 1926, settling in Richmond, Virginia. Both his namesake son and grandson, also named Clinton C. Boone, became ministers, carrying the family's religious calling into the fourth generation.

== Early life and education ==
=== Background ===
Clinton Caldwell Boone was born in Hertford County, North Carolina on May 9, 1872 to Charlotte (Chavis) Boone and the Reverend Lemuel Washington Boone, a minister. His parents were known as early African-American leaders in the Baptist church, who were committed to missionary work and education.

After the Civil War, his father, Reverend Lemuel Washington Boone, founded many independent Baptist churches for people of color, who mostly withdrew from the Southern Baptist Church. He co-founded and was the first president of the Roanoke Missionary Association, the state Baptist association organized by African Americans for their independent congregations. He also was a founding trustee of Shaw University, a historically black university in Raleigh.

=== Education ===
Boone started in the state's public schools, and was encouraged by his parents to obtain higher education. At the age of 19, he won a scholarship to Virginia Union University, a historically black university in Richmond, Virginia. While there he also studied at the Waters Normal Institute for teacher training and the Richmond Theological Seminary, graduating with a B. D. (Bachelor of Divinity) in 1900.

== Marriages and family ==
While attending Virginia Union University, Boone met Eva Roberta Coles (8 January 1889-8 December 1902), a student at the neighboring Hartshorn Memorial College for women. Eva graduated from Hartshorn in 1899, and returned to her hometown of Charlottesville, Virginia to teach. Boone graduated a year after her, and they were married on January 16, 1901. That year they went together to the Belgian Congo, where he was assigned as a missionary. She died there on December 8, 1902, after their child had died as an infant.

It was not until 1919 that the widower Boone married again. He married Rachel Tharps that year after traveling to the United States for a furlough from Liberia, where he had been for nearly a decade. Like his first wife, Tharps was a graduate of Hartshorn Memorial College. In 1920, they returned to Monrovia, Liberia. They were there for the celebration of his Providence Baptist Church's one hundredth anniversary in 1922.

Boone and Rachel had two children, Clinton Caldwell Boone Jr. (1923-25 March 2012), and Rachel H. C. Boone (1924–2007), while living in Monrovia. The Boones permanently left Liberia with their young children in 1926 to return to the United States, where they settled in Richmond, Virginia.

== Missionary work ==
=== Work in the Congo ===
After graduating from seminary school in 1900, Boone began his missionary work. He and his wife Eva traveled to the Congo Free State in 1901 to serve. They were sponsored jointly by the Lott Carey Foreign Mission Convention and the American Baptist Missionary Union. They arrived at the Palaballa station in the Katanga province of the Congo on May 24 of the same year. The territory was then under the personal rule of the Belgian king.

While in the Congo, Boone worked as a preacher and educator. He learned Kongo language to preach and teach the people in their own language. His wife Eva taught at a kindergarten for the village children and started a sewing school for the village women. But she encountered resistance due to her ignorance of this culture, in which the men traditionally did the sewing. After some time, she persuaded some women to take it up. According to Boone's memoir, the village women deeply respected Eva; they referred to her as "Mama Bunu."

Boone and his wife faced many challenges in the Congo. As a religious leader, Boone worked to prevent the Congolese from driving him and other evangelists away. Their royal rulers had led many of the people to Catholicism in the 16th century after their own conversion under the influence of Portuguese missionaries. Catholic natives burnt down the schoolhouse built by Boone and his followers. When the Americans appealed to the King's private Congo authorities for help, the latter said that the Kongo people must be allowed to decide if they wanted to follow Catholicism or Protestantism. Most of the villagers settled on Protestantism and gradually agree to rebuild the school.

==== Medical training ====
Boone's work as a medical missionary did not begin until after his wife Eva died in December 1902. Both he and the Congolese were greatly saddened by her death. Boone lived there alone for a time, but was grateful to receive an order to be transferred from Palabala station to another station called Ikoko. Boone stayed at Ikoko for a short time.

He later transferred to Lukunga station, to work with another American evangelist, Mr. Moody and his wife, in planting a new congregation. Although their main work was to preach and spread the gospel, they often gave out simple remedies such as castor oil, quinine, laudanum, epsom salts, etc. The need for a hospital and medically trained evangelists became apparent so they had a hospital built as well as a new schoolhouse. During that time, Boone took up a keen interest in medical training and was encouraged by Mrs. Moody.

During his time at Lukunga, Boone saw and treated patients from all over the Congo suffering from a variety of tropical diseases, in addition to Eurasian infectious diseases such as smallpox and measles likely introduced by Europeans and Americans. He treated "malaria fever, persistent malaria, hemorrhagic fever, smallpox, leprosy, measles, tonsillitis, meningitis, pleuritis, pericarditis, consumption [tuberculosis], pneumonia, sleeping sickness, cancer and ulcers." His first surgery was an amputation he performed on a man whose broken leg had developed an ulcer to the bone. Boone wrote that his success with the amputation, along with another, inspired him to return to the United States to study medicine.

After five years of service in the Congo, Boone returned to the United States in 1906. He attended medical school at the Leonard Hall at Shaw University, a historically black university in Raleigh, North Carolina.

=== Work in the Republic of Liberia ===
Upon graduating in 1910 from medical school at Shaw University, Boone qualified as a medical missionary for the Lott Carey Foreign Mission Convention. He was assigned to the newly established Republic of Liberia, which had been founded in the early 19th century as an American colony for free blacks. He was stationed in Brewerville.

Boone was later transferred to the capital, Monrovia, where he opened a day school. He also became the pastor of Providence Baptist Church, Liberia's first church, which was founded in 1822 by Lott Carey. Boone also served as Secretary of the American Legation when the acting secretary took a furlough to America. He put his medical missionary work on hold at that time but returned to medical work following the secretary's return.

While in Liberia, Boone treated patients with yaws, tonsillitis, meningitis, pneumonia, smallpox, hookworm, pinworm, tapeworm, guinea worm, malaria, heart lesions, blackwater fever (jaundice), and intermittent malaria. Boone also performed a successful Caesarian section on a woman whose fetus was tied by a witch doctor.

=== Further medical training ===
After nine years of medical service in Liberia, Boone was granted a furlough in 1919 to the United States. Having recognized the need for a dentist, because the only dentist in Liberia died from the international Spanish flu epidemic, Boone studied mechanical dentistry at the Bodee Dental School in New York City. He was supported in his studies by the Lott Carey Foreign Mission Convention. He and his second wife returned to Liberia for some time.

== Death ==
Boone drowned in the James River at Richmond, Virginia in July 1939.

== Legacy ==
Congo As I Saw It

"I do not regret a single sacrifice that I have made for the redemption of Africa and if I had ten thousand other lives I would be delighted to spend them all to lift up the fallen and care for the dying in Africa." p. 93

This memoir documents Boone's five years as an evangelist, educator, and missionary in the Congo from 1901-1906. Clinton used data and first hand experiences to write about the country and its people. This contains history and facts about the Congo. Boone captured daily experiences, cataloged the local animals and plants, and described the daily lives of the Kongo people, as well as his missionary work.

Liberia As I Know It This recounts Boone's time as a pastor and medical missionary in Liberia from 1910-1926, after he had earned his medical degree. He also wrote about Liberia’s history, privately founded as a colony by the American Colonization Society to resettle free African Americans. He also described the climate, the animals and plants, and material about the government and politics of the times.

His son Clinton Jr. followed his father into the ministry. Three years old when his family returned to the US, he attended the local segregated schools of the South before earning a bachelor's degree at Houghton College in upstate New York. He returned to Richmond to earn a theology degree at Virginia Union University; and, after he had moved to New York, also gained a master's degree in education at the C.W. Post Campus of Long Island University in Brookville. He had a career in teaching in Copiague and became pastor of Union Baptist Church of Hempstead in May 1957, serving 46 years before retiring. He had been elected to the Hempstead school board and was a leader in local religious and civic organizations. Boone died at age 90 and was survived by his daughter Evelyn Rane Boone-Franklin, son the Rev. Clinton C. Boone III, and a total of five grandchildren.
