= Jacob W. Prout =

Liberian politician

Jacob W. Prout (1804–1849) was a Liberian politician and physician. He served as the secretary of the 1847 constitutional convention.

== Biography ==
Prout was born free in 1804 in Baltimore, Maryland. He immigrated to the Commonwealth of Liberia in 1826. In the colonial Liberian government, Prout had been employed as a register of wills. In 1832, Prout returned to Baltimore with favorable accounts of Liberia. On December 9, 1832, along with 145 other Black Marylanders, he emigrated to Liberia permanently. During the travel, the first officer David C. Landis accused Prout of a number of improprieties. Landis's charges included ignoring the medical needs of passengers, as well as a sexual indecency. Prout served as a physician for the American Colonization Society until 1840, when Governor Thomas Buchanan abolished Prout's post to cut the colony's costs.

On July 5, 1847, the delegates to Liberia's constitutional convention first convened and elected officers. Prout was elected as secretary of the convention. Most of the papers relating to the convention have been lost, though a surviving account of the convention from Dr. James W. Lugenbeel, the American Colonization Society's white resident physician, criticized Prout's secretarial abilities, though it is unclear if Lugenbeel's negative portrayal of Prout's abilities are accurate. The convention produced the Liberian Declaration of Independence, as well as the republic's first constitution.

Prout's son, William A. Prout, served as governor the Republic of Maryland.

In 1847, Prout was elected as a member to the Senate of Liberia. In 1849, Prout died by drowning in Monrovia.
