= 1949 Liberian constitutional referendum =

Referendum abolishing the two-term limit on presidents

A constitutional referendum was held in Liberia on 3 May 1949. The changes to the 1847 constitution were approved in the Legislature in 1948, and abolished the two-term limit on presidents. The change was approved by voters.

== Constitutional change ==
The proposed changes would be to Chapter III.

Section	Original text	New text
Chapter III article 1	The Supreme Executive Power shall be vested in a President who shall be elected by the people and shall hold office for a term of eight years. He shall be Commander-in-chief of the Army and Navy. He shall in the recess of the Legislature, have power to call out the Militia or any portion thereof, into actual service in defence of the Republic. He shall have power to make treaties, provided the Senate concur therein, by a vote of two thirds of the Senators present. He shall nominate, and with the advice and consent of the Senate appoint and commission, all Ambassadors, and other public Ministers and Consuls, Secretaries of State, of War, of the Navy, of the Treasury, Attorney General, all Judges of Courts, Sheriffs, Coroners, Marshals, Justices of the Peace, Clerks of Courts, Registers, Notaries Public, and all other officers of State civil and military, whose appointment may not be otherwise provided for by the Constitution, or by standing laws.	The Supreme Executive Power shall be vested in a President who shall be elected by the people and shall hold office for a term of eight years. No President may be elected for two consecutive terms of eight years, but should a majority of the ballots cast at a second or any other succeeding election by all of the electors voting thereat elect him, his second or any other succeeding term of office shall be for four years. He shall be Commander-in-chief of the Army, Navy and Air Forces. He shall in the recess of the Legislature, have power to call out the Militia or any portion thereof, into actual service in defence of the Republic. He shall have power to make treaties, provided the Senate concur therein, by a vote of two thirds of the Senators present. He shall nominate, and with the advice and consent of the Senate appoint and commission, all Ambassadors, and other public Ministers and Consuls, Secretaries of State, of National Defence, of the Treasury, Attorney General, all Judges of Courts, Sheriffs, Coroners, Marshals, Justices of the Peace, Clerks of Courts, Registers, Notaries Public, and all other officers of State civil and military, whose appointment may not be otherwise provided for by the Constitution, or by standing laws.
Chapter III article 5 section 1	All Ambassadors and other public Ministers, and Consuls, the Secretary of State, of War, of the Treasury, and of the Navy, the Attorney General, and Postmaster General shall hold their offices during the pleasure of the President. Justices of the peace, sheriffs, coroners, marshals, clerks of courts, registers, and notaries public, shall hold their offices for the term of two years from the date of their respective commissions; but may be removed from office within that time by the President, at his pleasure: and all other officers whose terms of office may not be otherwise limited by law, shall hold their offices during the pleasure of the President.	All Ambassadors and other public Ministers, and Consuls, the Secretary of State, of National Defence, and of the Treasury, the Attorney General, and Postmaster General shall hold their offices during the pleasure of the President. Justices of the peace, sheriffs, coroners, marshals, clerks of courts, registers, and notaries public, shall hold their offices for the term of two years from the date of their respective commissions; but may be removed from office within that time by the President, at his pleasure: and all other officers whose terms of office may not be otherwise limited by law, shall hold their offices during the pleasure of the President.

A two-thirds majority in the vote was necessary for the changes to be approved.
