= Boston Jenkins Drayton =

Liberian judge (1821–1864)

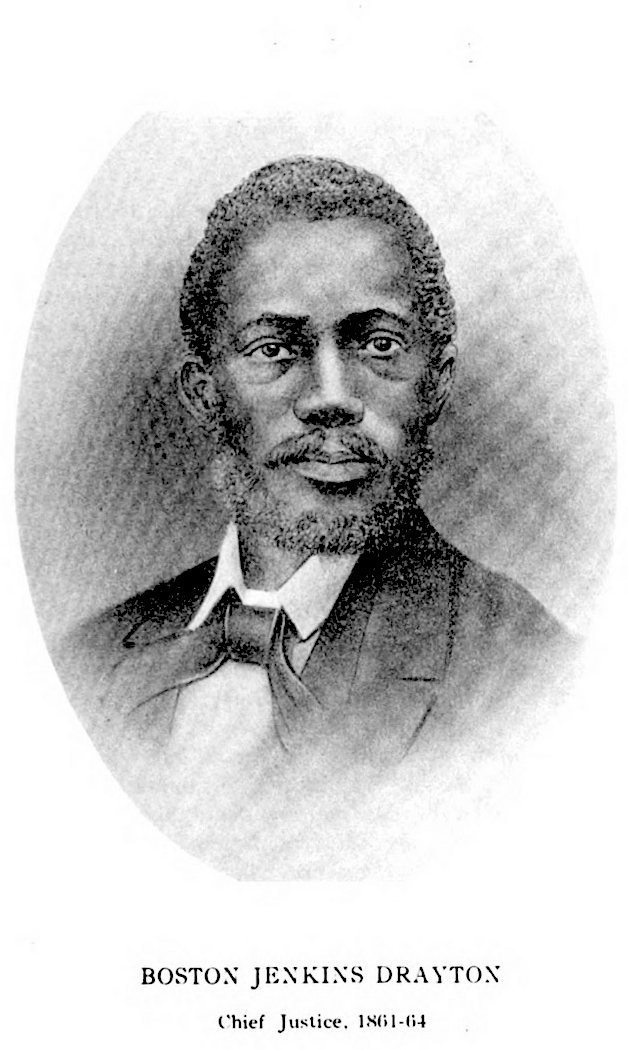

3rd Chief Justice of Liberia
- In office 1861–1864
- Nominated by: Stephen Allen Benson
- Preceded by: John Day
- Succeeded by: Edward J. Roye

3rd Governor of the Republic of Maryland
- In office December 1855 – March 18, 1857
- Preceded by: William A. Prout
- Succeeded by: None (Position abolished)

Personal details
- Born: 1821 Charleston, South Carolina, United States
- Died: December 12, 1864 (aged 42–43) Cape Palmas, Liberia

Boston Jenkins Drayton (1821–1864) was a Liberian politician and Lutheran minister who served as the 3rd Chief Justice of Liberia from 1861 until 1864. He had previously served as the final Governor of the Republic of Maryland from 1855 until its annexation by Liberia on March 18, 1857.

Born in 1821 in Charleston, South Carolina, Drayton paid the city's annual tax on free people of color (ages 15–50) from 1839 to 1844.

He served as one of the lay assistants serving the "colored congregation" at St. John's Lutheran Church in Charleston under Minister John Bachman. Drayton went to South Carolina, where he was ordained as a Lutheran minister in 1845. He left for Africa on 1845 November 6 and began to establish the "Lutheran Missionary School" in Liberia. However, he received no financial support from the Lutherans, so he came back to the U.S. On 1846 August 6, the New York Evening Post listed the Rev. B. J. Drayton as a passenger in the bark Chatham returning from Monrovia.

In 1847, Drayton was baptized a Baptist by the Reverend Robert Ryland, pastor of First African Baptist Church, in Richmond, Virginia.

In early 1848, Drayton was appointed by the Foreign Missionary Board (Southern Baptist) to serve as a missionary in Cape Palmas in the Republic of Maryland. and a farewell gathering was held on January 30, 1848.

In Liberia, he was elected pastor of the Providence Baptist Church in June 1848.

His 1865 obituary states that "Subsequently he was appointed by the Southern Baptist Convention superintendent of their missions in West Africa, discharging the duties with satisfaction there and to the authorities in this country."

He then pursued a career in politics, becoming the Lieutenant Governor of Maryland under Governor William A. Prout.

In December 1855, Drayton ousted Prout, who had become increasingly unpopular, and assumed the governorship, later being unanimously elected in April 1856 as the Governor of Maryland. By December of that year, relations between the American settlers and the native Grebo population had deteriorated to the point of open warfare. As Maryland had fewer than 1,000 settlers and had poor financing, Drayton appealed to Liberia for assistance. In response, President Joseph Jenkins Roberts dispatched a militia force to put down the Grebo rebellion. Drayton soon negotiated the annexation of Maryland by Liberia and stepped down as governor on March 18, 1857.

In 1861, Drayton was appointed Chief Justice of Liberia by President Stephen Allen Benson, serving until stepping down in 1864. He ran for president in 1863, but was defeated by Daniel B. Warner.

He died on 12 December 1864 as a result of accidental drowning when his canoe capsized near Cape Palmas. (NB: Many sources report his death as being in 1865, since the U.S. Newspapers printed his obituary in that year.)

Legal offices
Preceded by John Day	Chief Justice of Liberia; 1861–1864	Succeeded by Edward James Roye
