= 1847 Liberian general election =

- September 27, 1847
- Presidential election
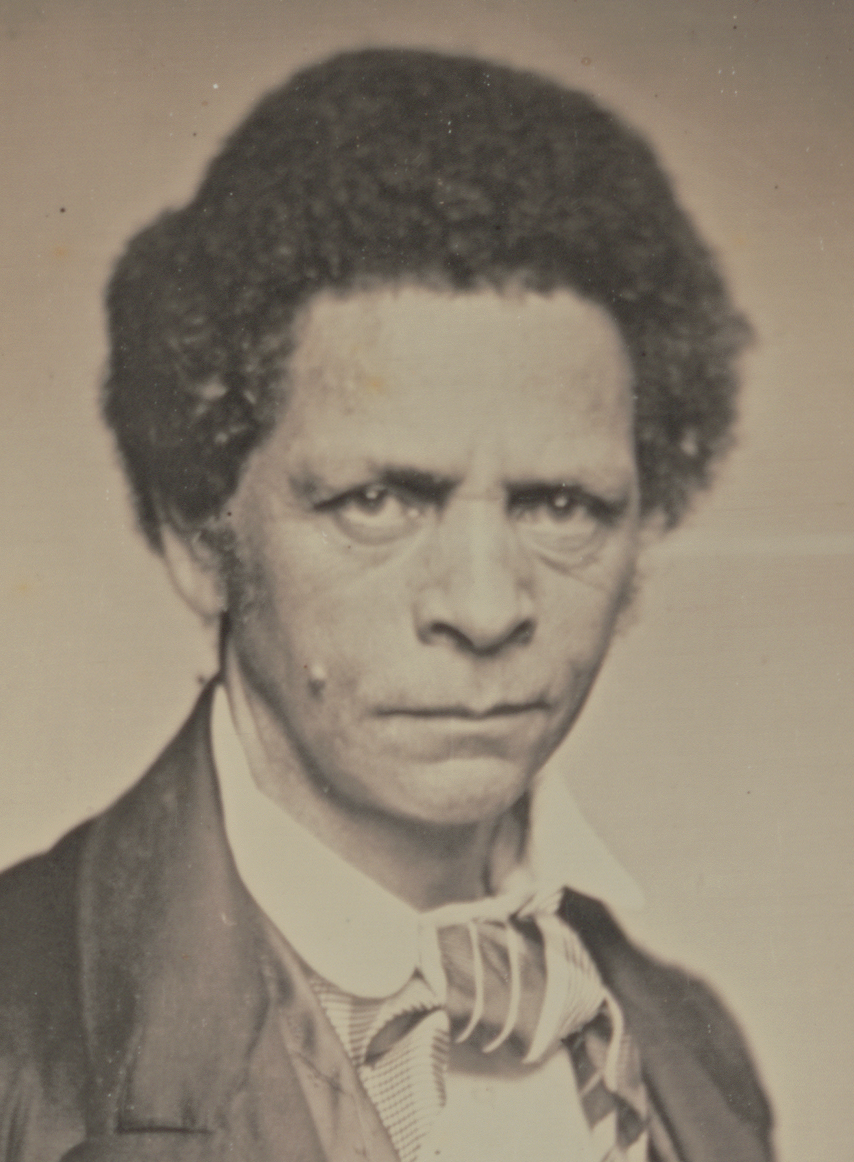

Nominee	Joseph Jenkins Roberts	Samuel Benedict
Party	Pro-Administration	Anti-Administration
Elected President
Joseph Jenkins Roberts

General elections were held for the first time in newly independent Liberia on September 27, 1847, alongside a constitutional referendum. The result was a victory for Governor Joseph Jenkins Roberts of the Pro-Administration Party, who defeated Samuel Benedict of the Anti-Administration Party. In a separate vote, Nathaniel Brander was elected vice president.

Roberts was sworn into office as the country's first president on January 3, 1848, with Nathaniel Brander as vice president.

== Campaign ==
Due to his part in the trial of Tobias Outland, who had murdered James Stevens in 1845, Benedict had faced condemnation across the electorate.

== Results ==
In the presidential vote, Benedict received only ten votes.

In Montserrado County John B. Gripon and John N. Lewis were elected to the Senate whilst D. B. Brown, William Draper, J.B. McGill, and Daniel Bashiel Warner were elected to the House of Representatives.
