= 1849 in Liberia =

- Decades: 1820s; 1830s; 1840s; 1850s; 1860s
- See also: Other events of 1849; Timeline of Liberian history

The following lists events that happened during 1849 in Liberia.

== Incumbents ==
- President: Joseph Jenkins Roberts
- Vice President: Nathaniel Brander
- Chief Justice: Samuel Benedict

== Events ==
=== May ===
- May 1 - General elections and a constitutional referendum were held.

=== Full date unknown ===
- The Liberian government gains the territory that would become Grand Cape Mount County by signing a treaty with the local inhabitants.
