= Lott Carey Foreign Mission Convention =

Organization

Lott Carey
- Logo
- Classification: Mainline Protestant
- Orientation: Baptist
- Polity: Congregational
- President: Jesse T. Williams Jr.
- Associations: Baptist World Alliance
- Founder: Rev. Lott Carey
- Origin: 1897
- Separated from: National Baptist Convention
- Congregations: 2,600
- Members: 1,200,000
- Official website: www.lottcarey.org

The Lott Carey Foreign Mission Convention, also known as the Lott Carey Global Christian Missional Community, Lott Carey Baptist Foreign Mission Society, USA, or simply Lott Carey, is a Baptist Christian denomination in the United States. It is affiliated with the Baptist World Alliance, and has a predominantly African American membership.

== History ==
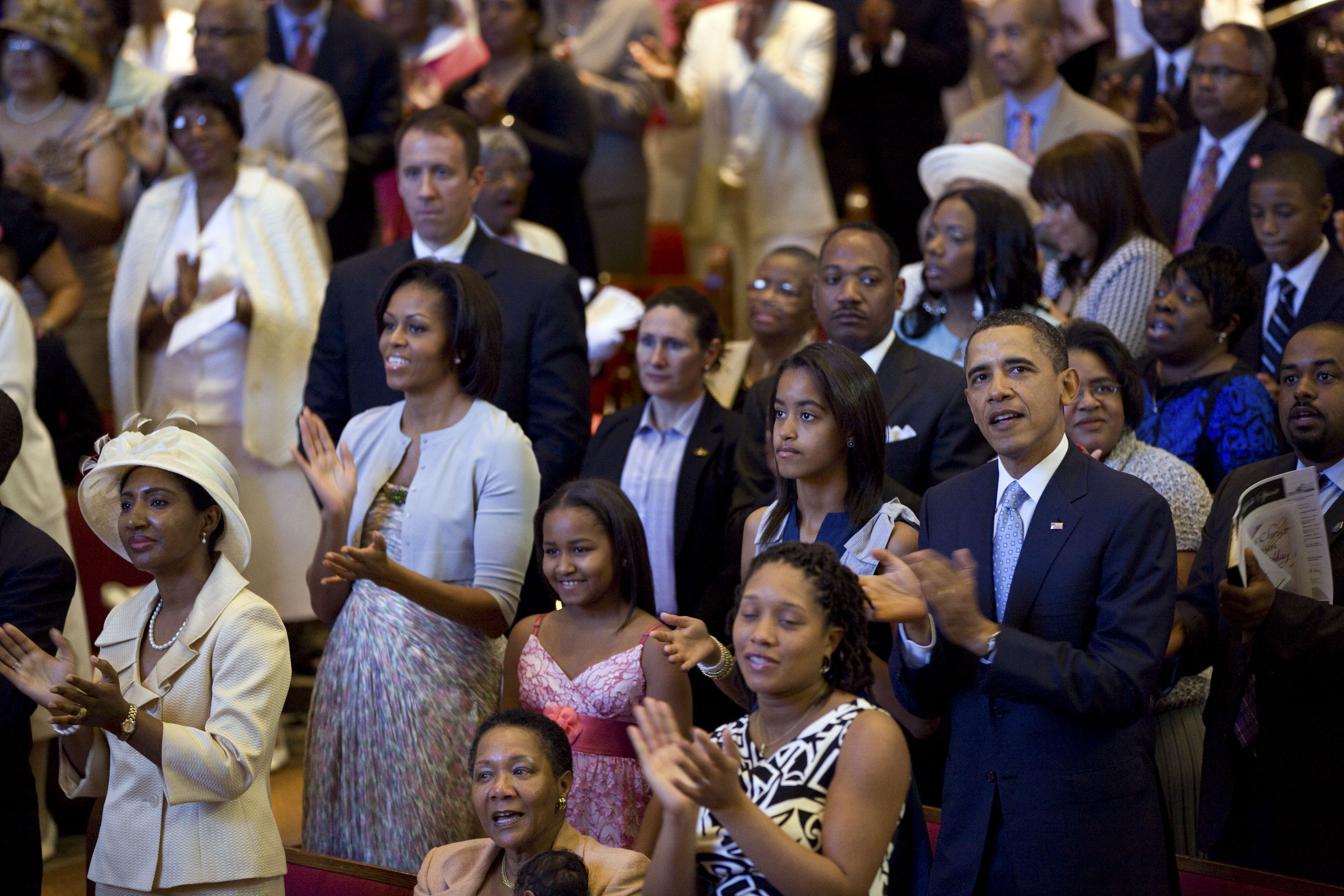
Worship service at Shiloh Baptist Church (Washington, D.C.).

The Lott Carey Foreign Mission Convention was established in 1897 out of the National Baptist Convention, USA. The convention was named for Lott Carey (1780-1828), a former African American slave who was the first American Baptist missionary to Africa. In addition, Carey established the first Baptist church in Liberia. It was named the Providence Baptist Church of Monrovia, the city that became the capital of the country.

By the dawn of the 21st century, the Lott Carey Foreign Mission Convention has operated under several names and engaged in ecumenism, and in 2021, the denomination elected Gina M. Stewart as the first female president of a Baptist convention in the United States. She also became the first female pastor to preach in the Joint National Baptist Convention of 2024.

== See also ==
- Clinton Caldwell Boone
- Eva Roberta Coles Boone
