= Millsburg, Liberia =

Village in Montserrado County, Liberia

Millsburg
- Township
- Location in Liberia
- Coordinates: 6°28′26.4″N 10°40′44.4″W
- Country: Liberia
- County: Montserrado County
- Settled: 1828

Millsburg is a township in Liberia. It is in Montserrado County.

== History ==
In early 1828, the Millsburg settlement was established in an agreement between Colonial Agent Jehudi Ashmun and Dei chiefs. In February 1828, Millsburg was settled by a small trading company of Americo-Liberian emigrants. It was established on the north bank of the St. Paul River. Millsburg is named after Samuel John Mills and Ebenezer Burgess, two agents of the American Colonization Society (ACS) who in 1818 made a reported on the British colony of Sierra Leone and its viability as a colony for African-American emigrants. Following Millsburg's founding, other settlements were made on both banks of the river.

In 1835, Mississippi Colonization Society sponsored its first group of African-American emigrants to Liberia, with most of the 71 people settling in Millsburg. In the 1839 constitution of Liberia, Millsburg is mentioned as one of the settlements comprising the Commonwealth of Liberia. In 1839, the Gola chief Gatumba attacked Dei people in Millsburg.

In the 1847 constitutional referendum preceding Liberia's independence, 21 voters in Millsburg voted in favor of the constitution, with none voting against it. In a book published in 1850, James W. Lugenbeel described Millsburg as the Liberian settlement furthest from the sea coast. In a 1898 book, William Henry Heard described Millsburg as a commercial center.

== Geography ==
Millsburg is situated on the St. Paul River. It borders Careysburg, Arthington, and Clay-Ashland. Under the 2023 to 2028 electoral map, Millsburg is a part of Montserrado County's 17th House of Representatives district.

== Notable residents ==
- Samuel Edward Peal (1923–1991), diplomat and politician
