= Hilary Teage =

Americo-Liberian politician, journalist and clergyman

1st Secretary of State of the Republic of Liberia
- In office 1848–1850
- President: Joseph Jenkins Roberts
- Preceded by: Office established
- Succeeded by: John N. Lewis

Personal details
- Born: 1805 Goochland County, Virginia, United States
- Died: May 21, 1853 (aged 47–48) Monrovia, Liberia
- Profession: Politician, journalist, Baptist minister, merchant

Hilary Teage (1805 – May 21, 1853), sometimes written as Hilary Teague, was an Americo-Liberian politician, journalist, Baptist minister and merchant who is considered a founding father of the West African nation of Liberia.

Born into an enslaved family in Virginia, Teage moved to Africa as a colonist under the auspices of the American Colonization Society (ACS) as a teenager. He became a leading citizen of Monrovia as a Baptist pastor, merchant, editor and owner of Liberia's leading newspaper, and the founder of the Liberia Lyceum. He also held several political offices in the ACS-administered colony. Teage became a leading advocate for Liberian independence from the ACS, drafting the Liberian Declaration of Independence in 1847 and serving on the convention to draft Liberia's first constitution.

After independence, Teage held several offices in the new republic, serving as a senator, the first Secretary of State and attorney general in the years that followed. After a period of ill health, he died in 1853. Due to his extensive published writing and speaking, as well as his involvement in Liberian independence, he is considered one of the most influential people in early Liberian history.

== Biography ==
=== Early life and education ===
Teague was born into an enslaved family in Goochland County, Virginia, United States, in 1805. His mother was Frances Teage and his father was Colin Teage. A skilled artisan, Colin was sold around 1807 to a family in Richmond, where he was able to save enough to purchase his family's freedom by 1819 and acquire property in neighboring Henrico County. The Teages also became members of the First Baptist Church of Richmond, which included blacks and whites but was segregated. The Teages attended school through the efforts of church members and became literate. Hilary Teage's education came through the patronage of white Baptist merchant William Crane.

=== Migration to Africa ===
Members of the church founded a local African missionary society, and the Teages became Baptist missionaries. Colin and Frances Teage, along with then 16-year-old Hilary and his sister, migrated to Africa, first for a brief period in Freetown and then to the nascent Colony of Liberia as part of the group led by Lott Cary that established the Providence Baptist Church.

During their early years in Liberia, the Teages bucked up against the policies of the local ACS agent, Jehudi Ashmun, who unilaterally reassigned land on which colonists had built homes and who required colonists to provide two days' worth of labor each week for the benefit of the colony, at the risk of losing food allowances for non-compliance. Colin Teage was part of the organized resistance to Ashmun, who was forced to leave his position in 1826.

Teage was ordained as a Baptist minister in 1832 and became pastor of the Providence Baptist Church of Monrovia in 1840. He remained pastor there throughout his career as a politician and journalist, preaching, performing weddings, performing baptisms and other pastoral functions. Unlike other Baptists, he was not judgmental about spiritual practices like conjuring, which he did not denounce among his flock.

=== Journalism and politics ===
Teage entered politics and journalism simultaneously in 1835, the year he became editor of the Liberia Herald after John Brown Russwurm left to become governor of the Republic of Maryland. (Note: He acquired the paper's ownership from the ACS in 1839.) Under Teage, the Herald became Liberia's leading newspaper. As editor, Teage became a dedicated promoter of Liberian independence and combined republicanism, black nationalism, and Christianity to make his case. He remained the newspaper's head until 1849, when he left to devote full attention to politics. The Herald was largely a one-man operation, with Teage serving as lead writer, commentator and editor. He was also a published poet on natural and patriotic themes.

Separate from his journalistic career and clergy service, Teage was a merchant, inheriting his father's businesses after 1838 and growing them to include ownership of five buildings in Monrovia, five warehouses along the Atlantic coast and eight ships in the coasting trade.

Also in 1835, he became colonial secretary, the highest-ranking official below the ACS colonial agent, a position he also took over from Russwurm. In 1838, he was the clerk of the convention that presented the settlers' views to the ACS regarding constitutional reform. These views, however, came too late to influence the ACS' 1839 constitution produced by Governor Thomas Buchanan. Tensions between the Americo-Liberians and the ACS, which was collapsing in the United States, deepened, and pro-independence sentiment grew. Teage chaired a committee that reported to the ACS board on independence starting in December 1844.

Teage was elected a commissioner for Montserrado County in 1840 and a senator for the county in 1848. In addition to his political activities, Teage promoted independence in speeches in the Liberia Lyceum (which was the owner of the Herald) and in his editorials in the Herald. He was a founder of the Lyceum and was its first president, elected in 1845. The neglect of Liberia by the ACS was the driving force behind Teage's interest in independence. He observed that Liberia would benefit from support from a more powerful state, preferably the United States, and when American support was not forthcoming he advocated negotiations with Great Britain, which had a dependency comprising formerly enslaved African American colonists at Freetown in Sierra Leone. Independence for Liberia would foster its hegemony over the West African coast and complement anti–slave trade patrols by Britain and French vessels.

=== Liberian independence ===
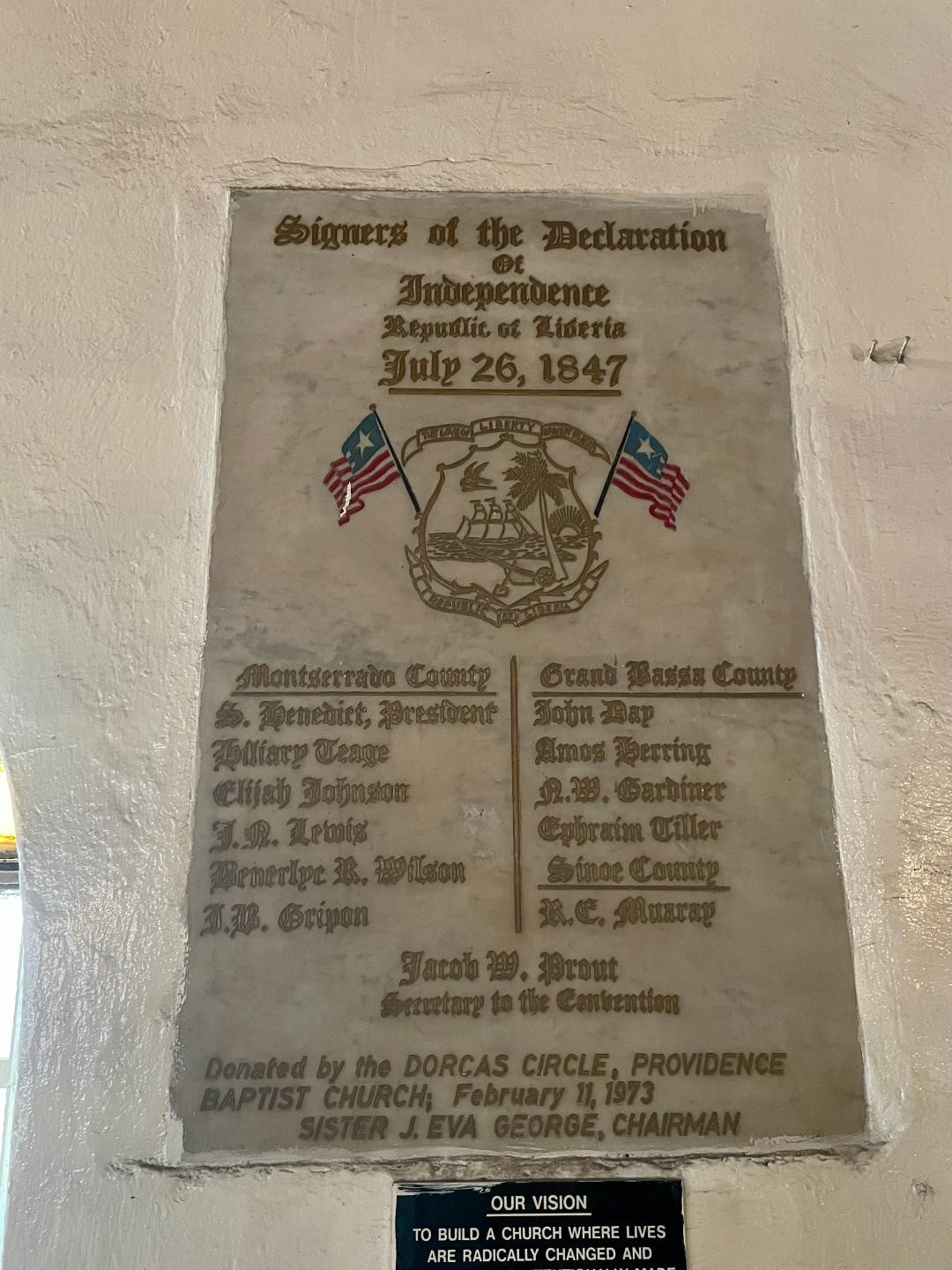
Teage's name is listed among other signers of the Liberian Declaration of Independence on a plaque at Providence Baptist Church.

Teage became an instrumental figure at the Constitutional Convention of 1847, where he represented Montserrado County, in both debating and ratifying the Liberian Constitution of 1847. Resisting efforts by the ACS to preserve its prerogatives in the constitution via proposals from American law professor Simon Greenleaf, Teage was assigned to draft a declaration of independence, a preamble to a new constitution and a bill of rights; Article I of the constitution included provisions adapted from Teage's 1839 proposals. On July 24, the convention rejected proposals associated with Greenleaf and the ACS, and two days later, the body approved Teage's draft declaration. On July 28, the new constitution was unanimously adopted. The declaration was adopted at Teage's Providence Baptist Church.

Teage also wrote the Liberian Declaration of Independence, which protested against the treatment of African Americans as slaves and second-class citizens in the United States. He deliberately modeled the Liberian declaration on the United States Declaration of Independence from the point of view of a people listing its grievances against the mother country. Grievances included in Teage's declaration were that African Americans were "in some parts of that country... debarred by law from all rights and privileges of man," including participation in governance and being "taxed without our consent" and "compelled to contribute to the resources of a country which gave us no protection." Black Americans had paths of improvement closed to them while white foreign immigrants received preferences over African Americans. "We uttered our complaints, but they were unattended to, or only met by alleging the peculiar institutions of the country," Teage's declaration continued. "All hope of a favorable change in our country was thus wholly extinguished in our bosoms, and we looked with anxiety for some asylum from the deep degradation."

In the Liberian declaration, Teage revised Thomas Jefferson's invocation of "life, liberty and the pursuit of happiness" with the rights to "life, liberty, and the right to acquire, possess, enjoy, and defend property." This tone of liberalism contrasted with Teage's Lyceum oratory and editorializing of 1845 and 1846, in which he had articulated a civic identity for Liberia rooted in virtue. As a merchant, he was a supporter of Liberian commercial independence and encouraged agricultural development of export crops like coffee, ginger and palm oil, which would be more likely to attract overseas investment.

Teage became the republic's first Secretary of State after Liberia declared independence in 1847. He also composed Liberia's hymn of independence. He served as acting president in 1852 when the president was abroad.

=== Later life ===
Teage was in ill health in his later years. He died in Liberia on May 21, 1853, and at the time was the country's attorney general. He was obituarized in Frederick Douglass' Paper (the successor to The North Star), even though Frederick Douglass had been an opponent of colonization.

== Political ideology ==
Teage biographer Carl Patrick Burrowes argued that Teage's ideology, along with that of other founding fathers of Liberia, was rooted in republicanism, an early form of Black Consciousness and African forms of Christianity. For example, in an 1846 speech, Teage invoked the "shades of the mighty dead" to embolden Liberians, which Burrowes called "tinges of ancestor veneration." He also summoned up African pride in speeches and hypothesized that Africa's past involved an earlier state of freedom that had fallen with the arrival of the slave trade and the participation of indigenous Africans in it.

Like other Americo-Liberians, Teage rejected the racial assumptions of many white Americans but embraced the ideology of American expansionism. In Teage's ideology, Liberia was a vanguard of American republicanism that would compete with European imperialism for dominance in Africa. With formerly enslaved colonists suspicious of American individualism, however, Teage promoted a republicanism based on civic virtue.

== Legacy ==
According to Bjorn F. Stillion Southard, "no single settler colonist had more impact on public life in colonial Liberia than Teage." Burrowes said he made "the single greatest personal contribution" to Liberian independence.

For his contributions to journalism, Liberian independence and constitutional thought, Teage has been described as Liberia's version of Benjamin Franklin, Thomas Jefferson and James Madison in one. Teage used his platforms in the Herald and the Lyceum to articulate a new civic identity for Liberians that would bridge their status as colonists to becoming free citizens in an independent nation. This identity was rooted in the obligation to commemorate the past hardships of the colonists and to debate actively the future of Liberia.

Robert W. July notes that Teage's draft of the declaration focused on the grievances of Americo-Liberians and gave short shrift to the indigenous Africans who had never migrated away from the region. This set the tone for future practice in which an elite class of migrants and their descendants ruled Liberia and in which native Africans did not have a guarantee of Liberian citizenship.

Teage's influence extended to the United States, where the Liberia Herald maintained a small circulation thanks in part to Teage's benefactor William Crane. His writing was also republished in the African Repository, the ACS magazine, and other outlets. He was a mentor to Edward Wilmot Blyden, who served as Teage's clerk in political offices and at the Herald and who adapted Teage's proto-black nationalism into a pan-Africanist ideology. Blyden described Teage as a "genius".

== Notes ==
Political offices
New office	Secretary of State of Liberia; 1848–1850	Succeeded by John N. Lewis
