= Rachel Boone Keith =

American physician (1924–2007)

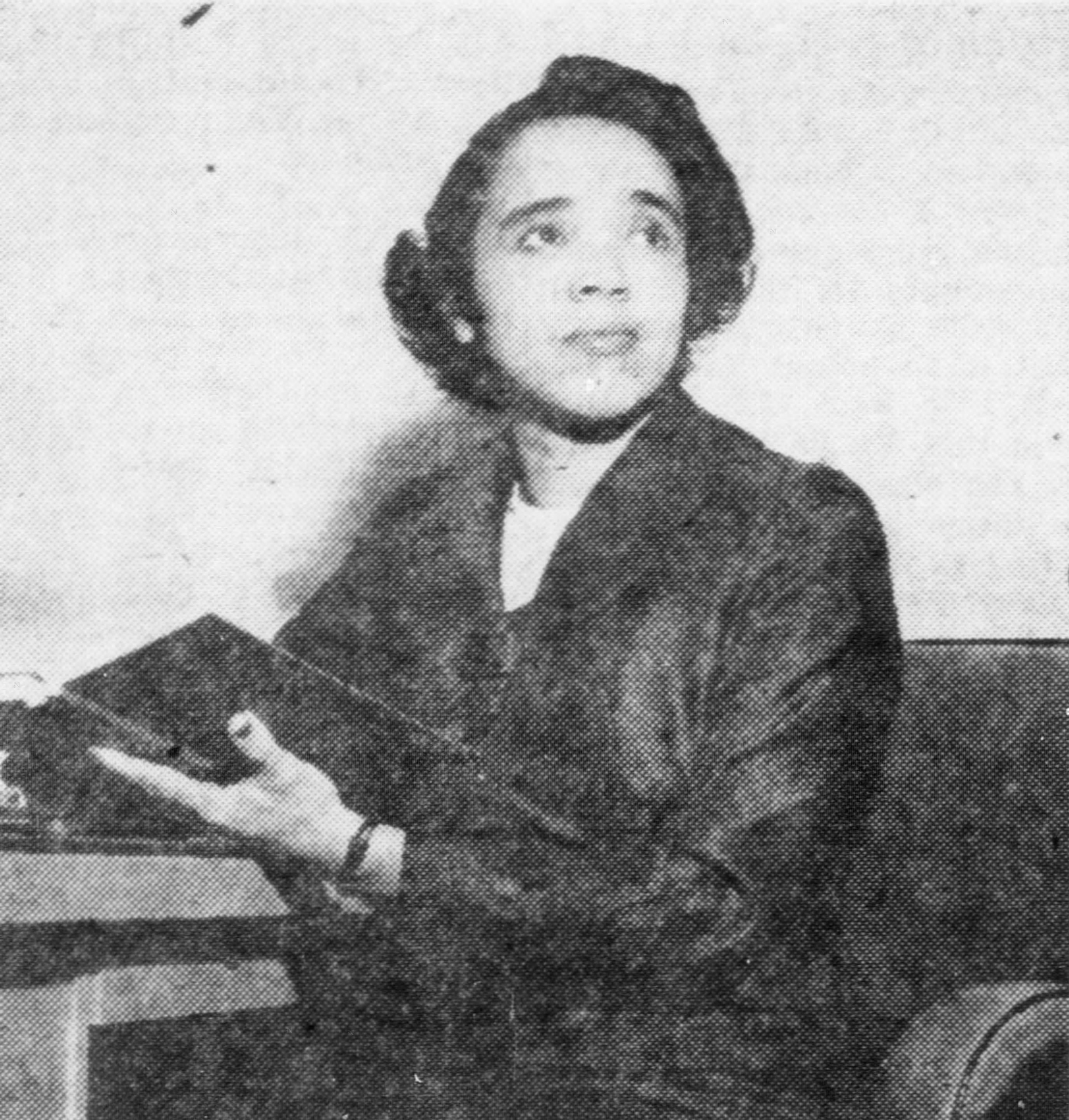
- A 1960 newspaper photograph of Keith
- Born: Rachel Hannah Celestine Boone; May 30, 1924; Monrovia, Liberia
- Died: January 4, 2007 (aged 82); Detroit, Michigan, USA
- Occupation: Physician
- Spouse: Damon Keith
- Parent: Clinton Caldwell Boone

Rachel Boone Keith (May 30, 1924 – January 4, 2007) was an American physician, born in Liberia.

== Early life ==
Rachel Hannah Celestine Boone was born to American Baptist medical missionaries Clinton Caldwell Boone and Rachel Allen Tharps Boone, in Monrovia, Liberia.

She was raised in Richmond, Virginia, where she graduated from Armstrong High School in 1938; that year she moved to Rhode Island to live with an aunt, physician Bessie B. Tharps. She graduated from Houghton College in 1943, and earned a medical degree at Boston University School of Medicine in 1949. Boone completed further medical training at Harlem Hospital and at Coney Island Hospital. She moved to Detroit in 1951.

== Career ==
Boone worked two years at Detroit Receiving Hospital, and joined the staff at Detroit Memorial Hospital in 1954, had a private internal medicine practice for many years, and served on the Michigan Board of Medicine, and was active with the Detroit chapter of the NAACP and other organizations. She was also a prominent member of Detroit's Tabernacle Baptist Church. She and Judge Keith were guests at Detroit's Bal Africain, an art benefit event, in 1973, including dinner with the Tanzanian ambassador, Paul Bomani.

== Personal life and legacy ==
In 1953, Rachel Boone married a lawyer, Damon Keith, who became a noted federal judge. They had three daughters: Cecile, Debbie, and Gilda. Rachel Boone Keith died in 2007, aged 83 years, in Detroit. Congressman John Conyers gave a tribute to Keith in the Congressional Record soon after her death. Later that year, she was honored posthumously with a LifeLine Award from the Wayne State University School of Nursing.

Her papers are held, along with her husband's, in the Walter P. Reuther Library at Wayne State University. There is a Rachel Boone Keith Prize Fund at the Boston University School of Medicine, to provide support for African-American women medical students at the school.
