= Francis Burns (minister) =

American bishop (1809–1863)

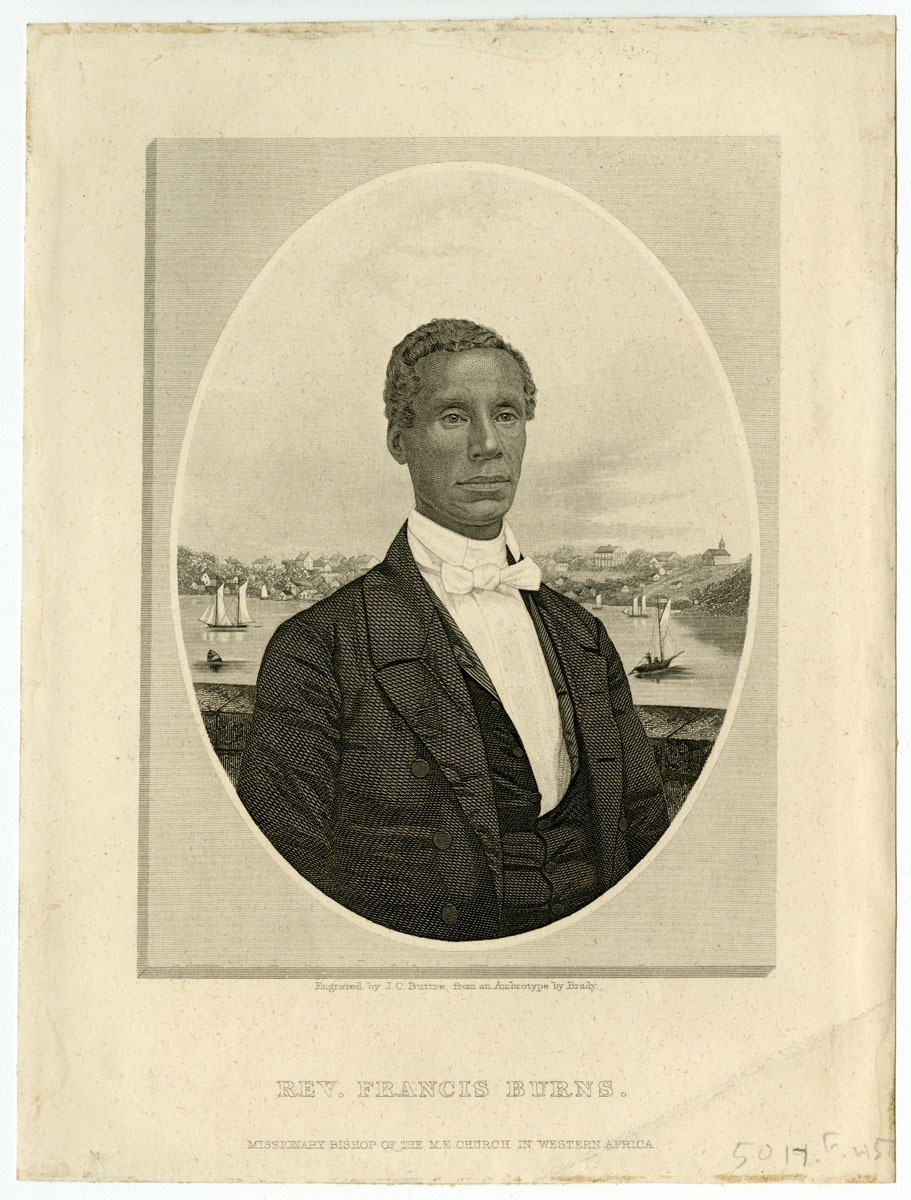
- Born: December 5, 1809; Albany, New York, US
- Died: April 18, 1863 (aged 53); Baltimore, Maryland, US
- Occupation: Missionary
- Known for: The first Missionary Bishop, and the first African-American Bishop of the Methodist Episcopal Church (elected in 1858)

Francis Burns (1809–1863) was an American Methodist minister who served as a missionary in Liberia. He was the first Missionary Bishop, and the first African-American Bishop of the Methodist Episcopal Church (elected in 1858).

== Birth, enslavement and early education ==
Burns was born December 5, 1809, in Albany, New York. He was said to be "thoroughly African in his complexion." New York was still a slave state at this time. His parents were so poor, such that at the age of four they placed their son in service with a farmer in Greene County, New York. At the age of eight, he was indentured to a Mr. Atwood (a farmer) to learn the farming business.

He was permitted to attend school with the other children of the neighborhood, during the winter season (which is when most early schools were open, the farm chores being fewer during the winter). Two years later, however, his health becoming poor, he was sent to the district school during the entire summer.

== Early religious life and ministry ==
The Atwood family was respectable and eminently pious, living in Ashland, New York, in a house now owned by Samuel Creech. Burns attended the North Settlement Methodist Church, County Route 10 Ashland. Mrs. Atwood was a Methodist class-leader. One who knew her said she was "a holy and zealous woman." At fifteen years of age Francis was converted to the Christian faith under the influence of Miss Stewart, a white teacher, the daughter of a Baptist preacher. At seventeen Francis felt that God required him to preach. Yet he refrained from doing so because he was bound to his master until the age of twenty-one.

His education was insufficient from Burns's own perspective, and there appeared no field in which he might labor to answer his calling. When the way finally opened, he felt unwilling to enter it. But possessing an unquenchable thirst for knowledge, he employed all his efforts to obtain it. While attending a high school he began to hold religious meetings, and to exhort. He also began to teach school. Indeed, he is said to have been "the first colored student in a white school," the Academy at Lexington Heights, New York. He is also said to have been "the first colored teacher in a white school," in his own community, where he received marked respect. He was subsequently licensed as a local preacher on the Windham circuit.

Bishop Matthew Simpson said of Francis Burns, in reflection:

By his intelligence, his consistent piety, and by the force of his character, he rose above the disabilities of his color, and commanded the respect of all that knew him.

== Missionary service ==
The Rev. Francis Burns became noticed as a pastor and a preacher. A Dr. Terry of the Mission Rooms was chiefly instrumental in leading him into missionary work. He encouraged Francis to enter upon a course of study, that he might be ready to go to Liberia or elsewhere, should the door open. In 1833 Dr. Terry secured for Francis an interview with Bishop Hedding. In 1834, when the Rev. John Seys was about to sail for Liberia, it was arranged that the Rev. Burns should accompany him as a Missionary Teacher. Sailing in September of that year, they arrived in Monrovia on October 18.

The Rev. Burns's first appointment in Liberia was as at Cape Palmas. For two years he suffered from the dreaded fever. He joined the Liberia Annual Conference in 1838, and in 1840–42 was an assistant Preacher on the Bassa Circuit. During 1843 and the early part of 1844 he was appointed to Monrovia. In due course he was elected to orders. Then ten years after arriving in Liberia, returning to New York, Francis Burns was ordained by Bishop Janes.

The Rev. Burns performed hard and difficult work in the missionary field. He also occasionally occupied the post of teacher in the Monrovia Seminary. He served as editor of the Africa's Luminary, doing so with marked ability.

== Ordained ministry ==
The Rev. Francis Burns returned to the U.S. in 1844. He was ordained deacon June 16, 1844, in Brooklyn, N.Y. He was ordained Elder in the Mulberry Street Church in New York City the same day, with Bishop Janes officiating at both services. The Rev. Burns returned to Liberia later that year.

When, at the 1849 session of the Mission Conference, the work in Liberia was divided into districts, the Rev. Burns was appointed Presiding Elder of the Cape Palmas District. For six years of the ten that he was Presiding Elder, he also served as President of the Conference, reporting clearly and comprehensively the business of the mission to the Missionary Board in New York. In 1851, Burns also was sent to open an academy in Monrovia and to superintend the Mission there.

== Episcopal ministry ==
The 1856 General Conference of the Methodist Episcopal Church made provision for the first time for the election and consecration of a Missionary Bishop (for the African work). Accordingly, in January 1858 the Liberia Annual Conference elected the Rev. Francis Burns as their first Bishop. He returned to the US for consecration. This took place 14 October 1858 at the session of the Genesee Annual Conference, meeting in Perry, Wyoming County, New York. Bishops Janes and Baker presided at the consecration.

Bishop Simpson, quoting Dr. John Robie (who was present at the conference), described the proceedings:

Though of ebony complexion, he had gained wonderfully on the affection and respect of all who had made his acquaintance, and especially of those privileged to an intimate association with him. His manner is exceedingly pleasant, and his spirit is as kind, sweet, and good as ever beamed from human heart or disposition. He seems to be lacking in none of the qualifications of the gentleman and Christian minister. He possesses also an intelligent and cultivated mind, speaks readily and fluently, and even eloquently, and is in all respects a model African. Such is the man whom the Liberian Conference has selected for a bishop, and such the one the highest authorities of one American church have set apart for the sacred and responsible position.

Bishop Burns returned to Africa almost immediately following his consecration, where he devoted himself to the work which devolved upon him for the next nearly five years.

== Failing health and death ==
Bishop Burns's health began to fail. He was therefore directed to take a sea voyage. On the advice of his physician, Bishop Burns then returned to the U.S.A. He died April 18, 1863, within three days of his arrival in Baltimore, Maryland, a mere three months after Emancipation in the United States. Bishop Burns was buried in Palm Grove Cemetery in Monrovia, Liberia.

== See also ==
- List of bishops of the United Methodist Church
