= 1847 Liberian constitutional referendum =

- 27 September 1847

Results
Choice	Votes	%
Yes	214	78.68%
No	58	21.32%

A constitutional referendum was held in Liberia on 27 September 1847. The new constitution would create a President with executive powers and a bicameral Legislature. It would also restrict voting rights to those of African descent and landowners. It was approved by 79% of voters (although only 272 people voted). In Monrovia, Millsburg, Bassa Cove and Bexley 100% of voters supported the constitution, whilst 100% voted against it in Sinoe. In Edina opponents of the constitution prevented the polling station opening, and a fist-fight broke out between Amos Herrnig and Ephraim Titler, two of the Liberian Declaration of Independence signatories. Opponents of the constitution in Bassa Cove and Bexley chose not to vote.

== Results ==
Choice	Votes	%
For	214	78.68
Against	58	21.32
Total	272	100.00

=== By town ===
Town	For	Against
Bassa Cove	9	0
Bexley	16	0
Caldwell	22	6
Marshall	4	12
Millsburg	21	0
Monrovia	111	0
New Georgia	31	3
Sinoe	0	37
Source: Huberich
