= Palm Grove Cemetery =

Cemetery in Monrovia, Liberia

Coordinates: 6.3114°N 10.8061°W

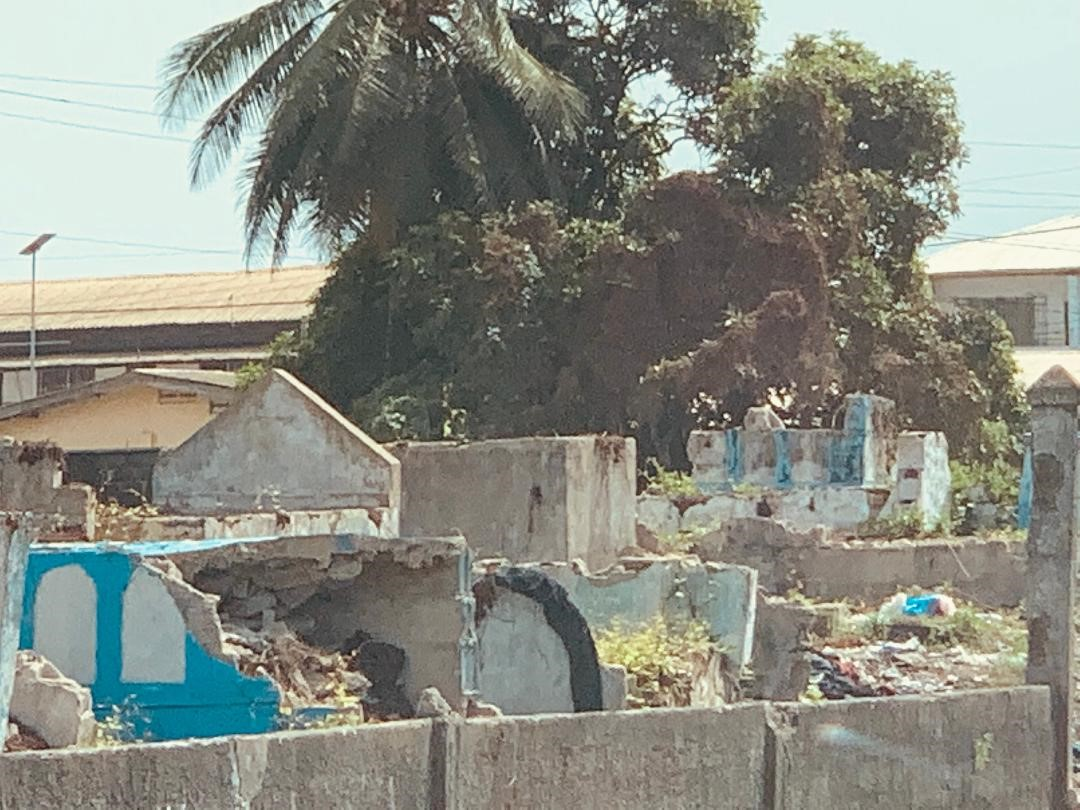
The cemetery suffers from severe neglect.

Palm Grove Cemetery is a cemetery near downtown Monrovia, the capital city of Liberia. During the Tolbert administration, the cemetery became the focus of the national Decoration Day, which continued to be observed after Tolbert was murdered in a 1980 coup d'état and his body dumped at the cemetery. Once the country's national cemetery, it was threatened during June 1982 by Monrovia municipal authorities. In a complaint to the People's Redemption Council, the city noted that the cemetery was being used as a waste dump and was so full of graves that new burials were being conducted unsafely, even though increasing numbers of local residents were being buried in Paynesville. The authorities requested permission to close the cemetery to new burials and to move the cemetery to a new location, away from its original Center Street site, but the cemetery remains in Monrovia to date.

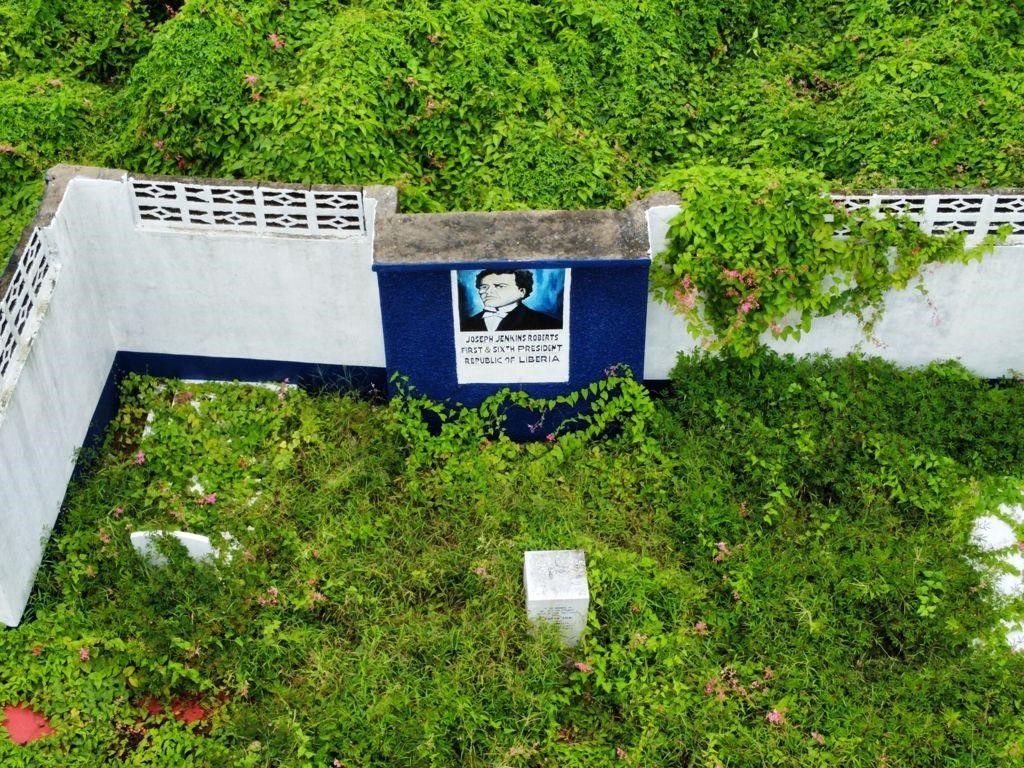
Joseph Jenkins Roberts gravesite

== Notable burials ==
- Martin Henry Freeman (1826–1889) – University president
- Henry Highland Garnet (1815–1882) – United States ambassador to Liberia
- Joseph Jenkins Roberts (1809–1876) – President of Liberia
- Hilary Teague (1805–1853) – founding father of Liberia
- William Tolbert (1913–1980) – President of Liberia
