= Lott Cary Birth Site =

Historic house in Virginia, United States

- U.S. National Register of Historic Places
- Virginia Landmarks Register
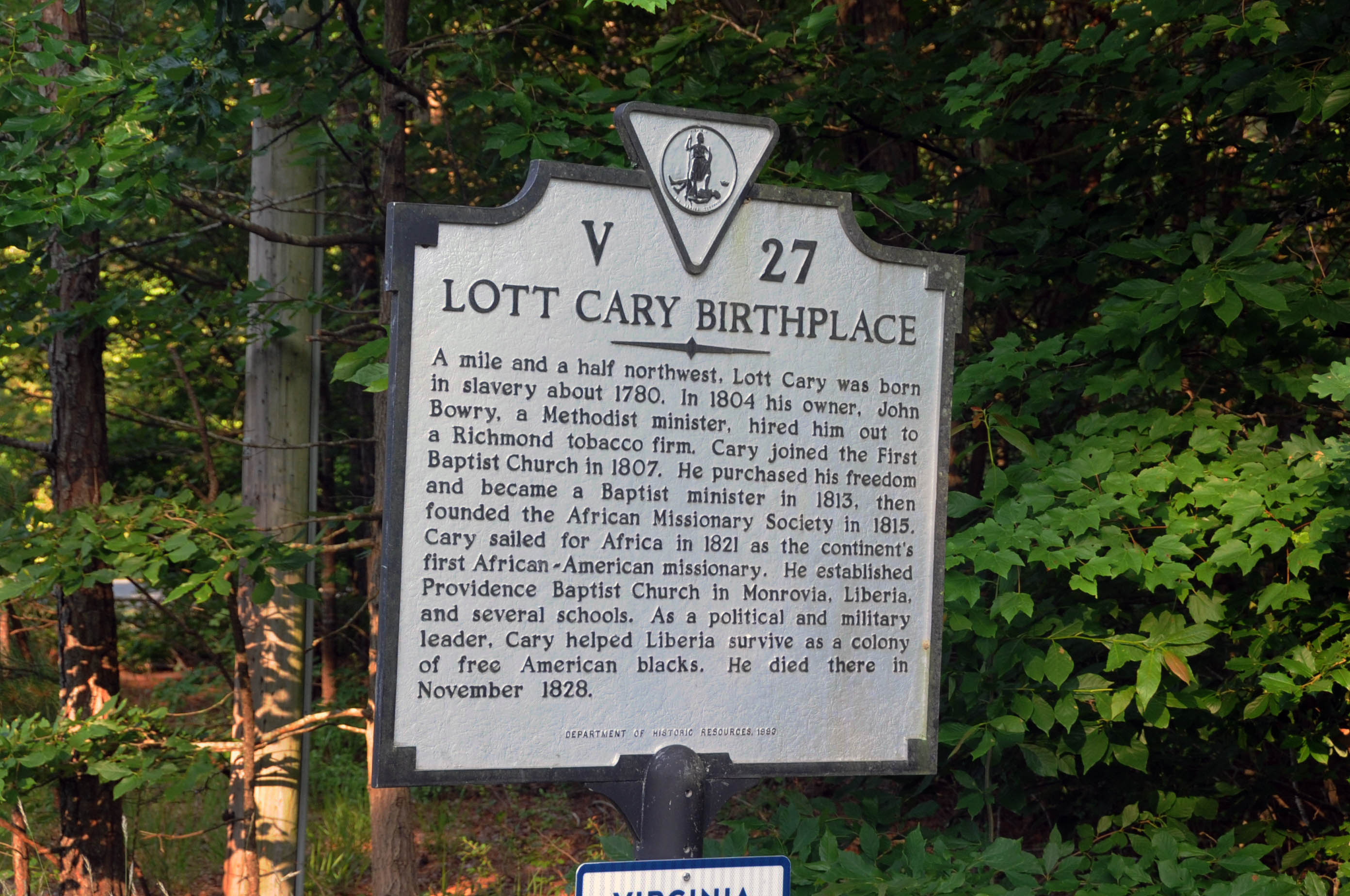

- Location within Virginia Location within the United States
- Location: NW of Charles City on VA 602, Charles City, Virginia
- Coordinates: 37°23′3″N 77°4′53″W
- Area: 4 acres (1.6 ha)
- Built: 1780
- NRHP reference No.: 80004883
- VLR No.: 018-0061

Significant dates
- Added to NRHP: July 30, 1980
- Designated VLR: May 20, 1980

Lott Cary Birth Site, also known as the Lott Cary House, is a historic home located near Charles City, Charles City County, Virginia. The modest wooden frame plantation house was built in the late-18th century, and consists of a 1 1/2-story, three-bay, original main house, extended by the later addition of one-story wings. Little of the original fabric remains.

There is a strong local oral tradition that the property was the birth site of Lott Cary (1780–1828), a slave held by planter John Bowry, who owned the house. After being hired out in Richmond, Virginia, Cary bought his freedom and that of his children. He had been promoted to supervise tobacco workers and also served as a shipping clerk. In the state capital he became a Baptist minister and lay physician, and learned to read and write. He emigrated to the new Colony of Liberia in Africa in 1821, where he helped develop it. He established the first church in Monrovia, and set up Christian schools for natives in the interior. He also served several months in 1828 as acting governor.

At the time of Cary's birth in 1780, this house served as the residence of Cary's master John Bowry, whose plantation comprised more than 600 acres. Cary was most likely born in slave quarters near the house, but no dependencies remain on the property.

This house and site was added to the National Register of Historic Places in 1980, in recognition of Cary's significance in American history.
