= Eva Roberta Coles Boone =

African-American teacher and missionary (1880–1902)

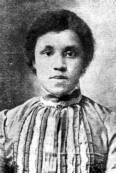
- Born: Eva Roberta Coles; January 8, 1880; Charlottesville, Virginia
- Died: December 8, 1902 (aged 22); Palaballa, Congo Free State
- Occupations: Educator, Missionary
- Spouse: Clinton Caldwell Boone (m. 1901)

Eva Roberta Coles Boone (1880–1902) was an African-American teacher and Baptist missionary from Charlottesville, Virginia, who served with her husband Clinton Caldwell Boone in what was then the Congo Free State, now the Congo.

== Early life ==
Eva Roberta Coles was born January 8, 1880, in Charlottesville, Virginia. Coles attended Hartshorn Memorial College, the first college in the world for women of color. She graduated in 1899.

== Career and family ==
After graduation, Coles returned to Charlottesville to teach. In 1901, Coles married Clinton Caldwell Boone, who had attended seminary at Virginia Union University, located a block north of Hartshorn, and earned his divinity degree in 1900. The son of a minister, he was born and grew up in Hertford County, North Carolina.

Boone and her husband received an appointment to the mission field, supported by the American Baptist Missionary Union and the Lott Carey Foreign Mission Convention. They arrived at the Palabala station in the Katanga province of the Congo Free State on May 24, 1901.

At this time, it was unusual and controversial for American religious organizations to offer people of color missionary opportunities to serve in Africa. At the Palabala station, she taught kindergarten, administered medical treatment, and organized a sewing circle for the women of the village. She tried to teach women to sew, but in the culture of the Kongo people, men traditionally dominated this work. She gradually worked to change cultural taboos against women sewing. The women of the village called her "Mama Bunu".

Coles died of a venomous bite on December 8, 1902, in Palaballa, Congo Free State (now part of the Democratic Republic of the Congo). She and her husband had experienced the death of their child as an infant.
