= Joint National Baptist Convention =

2005 meeting of African American groups

The Joint National Baptist Convention, also known as the Joint Black National Convention, or National Baptist Joint Board Session, was initially a joint meeting in 2005 of the four predominantly African American Baptist denominations operating under the derivatives of the name "National Baptist Convention." Its participants—the National Baptist Convention, USA; National Baptist Convention of America; Progressive National Baptist Convention; and National Missionary Baptist Convention of America—represented over 17 million African American Baptists in the United States in 2004. The latter three organizations have either originated from or traced their origin to the National Baptist Convention, USA—or the mother church.

== History ==
The four National Baptist bodies met in Nashville, Tennessee from January 24–28, 2005 for worship and celebration, and with the aim of establishing a joint agenda for African American Baptists. At the end of their meeting, they issued a joint statement outlining their shared political positions, including opposition to the Iraq War, school vouchers, and prison privatization and support for increasing the minimum wage and increasing U.S. government foreign aid in the regions of Africa, the Caribbean, and Latin America.

In 2023, it was announced that the four organizations would again unite as the National Baptist Joint Board Session from January 22–25, 2024 in Memphis, Tennessee. In January 2024, the four National Baptist bodies held the session with representation from the United States and the Bahamas. During this joint meeting, Dr. Gina Stewart—president of the Lott Carey Foreign Mission Convention—became the first woman pastor to preach before all the conventions.
