= Providence Baptist Church =

Historic church building in Monrovia, Liberia

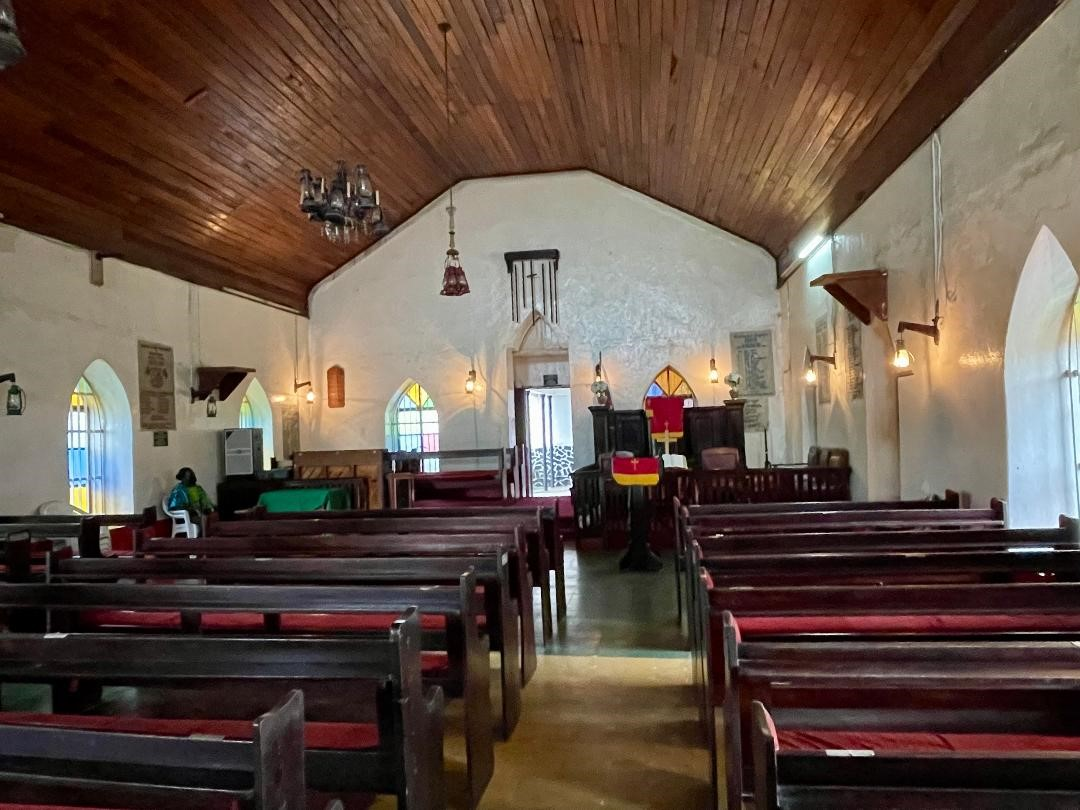
- The interior of the historic 1839 sanctuary
- Providence Baptist Church
- 6°19′00″N 10°48′16″W
- Address: Broad, Center and Ashmun Streets, Monrovia
- Country: Liberia
- Denomination: Baptist
- Website: providence1821.com

History
- Founded: 1821
- Founder: Lott Cary

Architecture
- Completed: 1839 (historic sanctuary)

Clergy
- Pastor: Samuel B. Reeves Jr.

Providence Baptist Church is a historic Baptist church in Monrovia, Liberia. Founded in 1821 by some of Monrovia's earliest settlers as part of the colonization movement, it was the site of the signing of the Liberian Declaration of Independence in 1847. It is the oldest church in Liberia and the second-oldest Baptist church in Africa. Its 1839 building is Liberia's oldest permanent building and the oldest Baptist church building in Africa.

For most of its history, the church was closely tied to the ruling Americo-Liberian elite. Starting in the 1980s, after a coup d'état, the church experienced the killing of members and interruption of services. For its role in Liberian independence, it is recognized as a national shrine.

== History ==
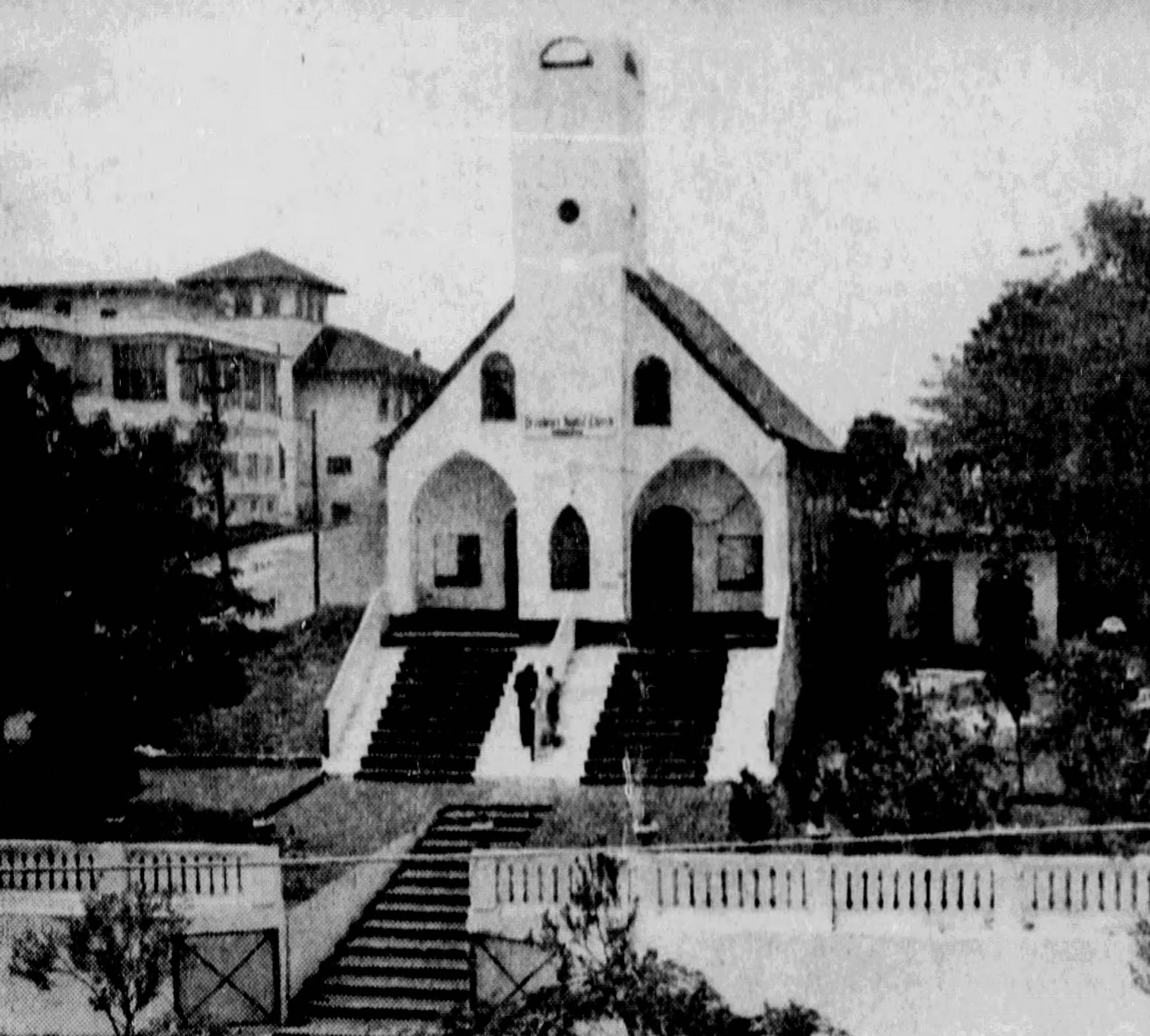
Providence Baptist Church c. 1971

Providence Baptist Church was formed in 1821 in Richmond, Virginia, where a group of seven formerly enslaved Baptists embarked on the first Black missionary endeavor in Africa. Lott Cary was elected the group's pastor, and other settlers included his wife, Nancy, as well as Colin Teague and his teenage son Hilary. In January 1822, the group arrived in Liberia, initially landing on Providence Island in the Mesurado River before relocating to the mainland.

By 1825, the church had 60 members. It erected a building in 1839 that is still in use today. The 1839 building is Liberia's oldest permanent building and the oldest Baptist church building in Africa. During the 19th century, the church was dominated by Americo-Liberian migrants instead of indigenous Africans. The congregation was dependent on financial support from United States churches during this period.

The church is known as the site where the Liberian Declaration of Independence from the American Colonization Society and the Liberian Constitution of 1847 were officially adopted on July 26, 1847. The Declaration was drafted by Hilary Teage, a journalist who had been appointed Providence Baptist Church's pastor in 1840. The constitution and declaration were modeled on those of the United States. The church adopted the name "Providence" during Teage's pastorate.

With membership topping 1,500 by the time Providence celebrated its 150th anniversary, but the 1839 building seating only 350, the church undertook a $300,000 fundraising campaign for a new sanctuary.

A much larger modernist church building was completed in 1976 adjacent to the 1839 church. The new sanctuary was constructed with contributions from American churches. The new building quickly began to deteriorate from moisture and mildew. Meanwhile, the church's legacy as a community of Americo-Liberians put its members in a precarious position after Samuel Doe's 1980 coup; two Providence deacons were killed during the coup. Services in the church were interrupted for five months starting in July 1990 due to the First Liberian Civil War.

== Political influence ==
Providence Baptist Church has been described as the "cornerstone of the nation" for its role in the founding of Liberia, and its members have often included influential Liberians and political leaders. For example, Lott Cary served as vice-agent of the American Colonization Society in addition to pastoring the church. The church has often hosted American politicians. U.S. Senator Raphael Warnock, an ordained Baptist minister, has preached there multiple times. In 2022, to mark the bicentennial of the settlement of Providence Island, the church was visited by a U.S. congressional delegation comprising Gregory Meeks, Joyce Beatty, Ami Bera, G. K. Butterfield, Troy Carter, Brenda Lawrence and Ilhan Omar.

== Preservation ==
The church has been a national shrine of Liberia since 1975. As the congregation approached its bicentennial, it sought to have the church building listed as a UNESCO World Heritage Site.
