= Ephraim Titler =

Liberian politician

Ephraim Titler (born 1800) was a Liberian politician and missionary who served as a delegate to the 1847 Constitutional Convention from Grand Bassa County.

== Biography ==
Titler was born in New York in 1800. Titler was born free and was literate. In 1832, Titler and his wife, Nancy, emigrated to Liberia. In 1836, he once again visited the United States, where he became the second Black student to attend Lafayette College. He stayed there for six months, where he studied theology with George Junkin. He was then ordained by the Philadelphia Presbytery, and returned to Liberia, to serve as a missionary for the Bassa people.

In 1847 Titler represented Grand Bassa County in the constitutional convention, in which the Liberian Constitution of 1847 and the Liberian Declaration of Independence were drafted. After the convention, Titler campaigned against independence, along with the sentiment of other Grand Bassa delegates, such as Amos Herring. The three major concerns of the people of the county were the continued ownership of public land by the American Colonization Society after independence, a feared increases in taxes, as well as a fear that the country would be dominated by Montserrado County. Little is known of Titler's life after this point.

As a signatory of the Declaration of Independence, Titler is represented as one of the eleven stripes on the flag of Liberia. Titler is also represented by a stripe on the flag of Grand Bassa County, which has stripes for each Declaration signatory from the county.
