= William A. Prout =

19th century Liberian politician

4th Governor of the Republic of Maryland
- In office June 6, 1854 – April 1856
- Preceded by: Samuel Ford McGill
- Succeeded by: Boston Jenkins Drayton

William A. Prout was a Liberian politician.

Prout was the son of Jacob W. Prout, who served as secretary of the Liberian Constitutional Convention. Prout served as the first elected governor of Republic of Maryland after the country achieved independence. In April 1856, Prout was removed from office for repeated public drunkenness.
