= Martin Henry Freeman =

African American academic administrator (1826–1889)

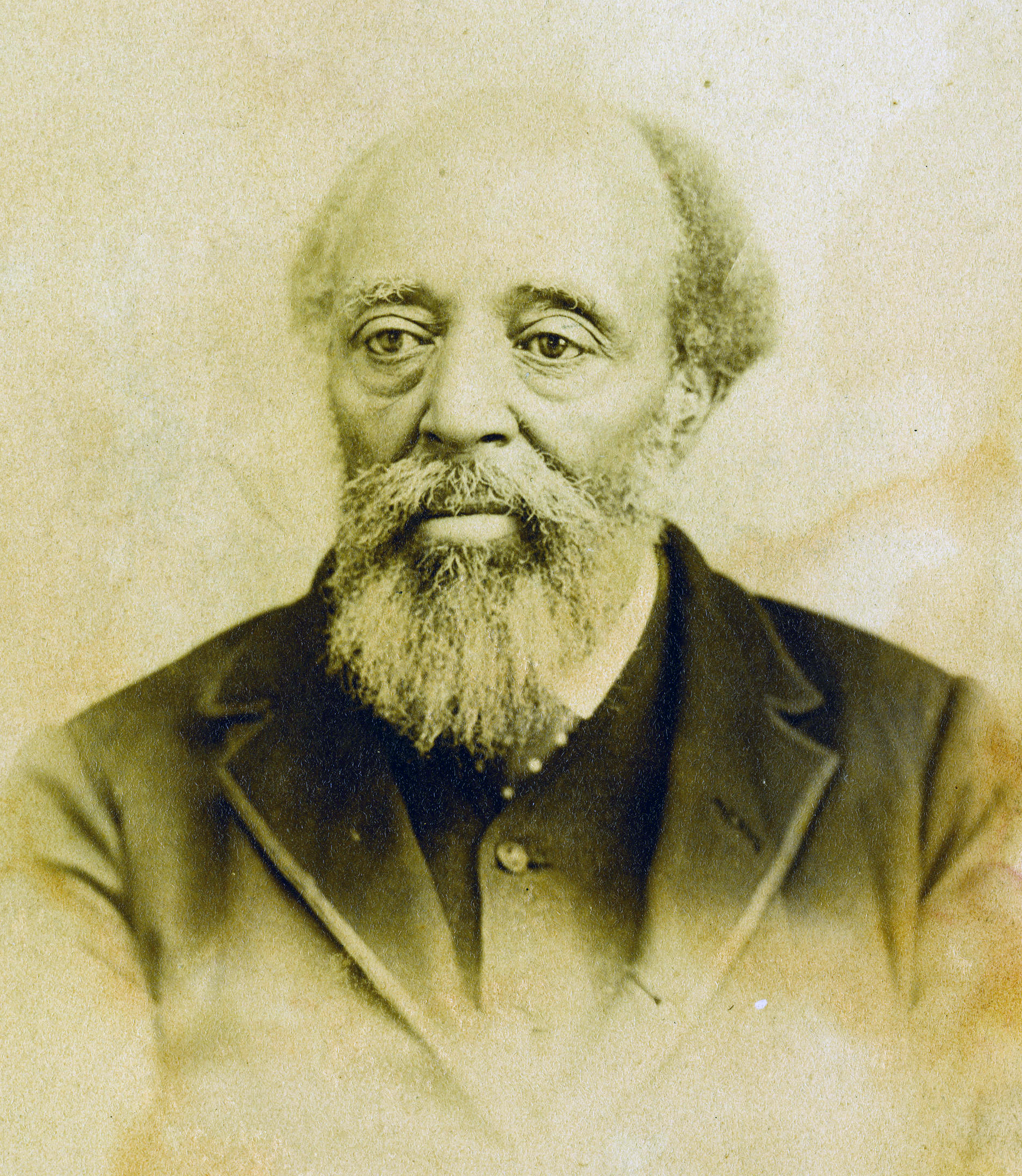
Martin Henry Freeman, c. 1880s

Martin Henry Freeman (1826–1889) was the first African-American to be president of an American college. Named president of Avery College in Pennsylvania in 1856, he also later served as president of Liberia College.

== Biography ==
Freeman was born in Rutland, Vermont in 1826. After receiving private tutelage from a local reverend, William Mitchell, Freeman attended Middlebury College, where he graduated as salutatorian in 1849. The following year, he moved to Pittsburgh, Pennsylvania, to take up a position as professor of science and mathematics at the Allegheny Institute (later Avery College), a new state-chartered college founded to educate free African Americans. He was named president of the college in 1856.

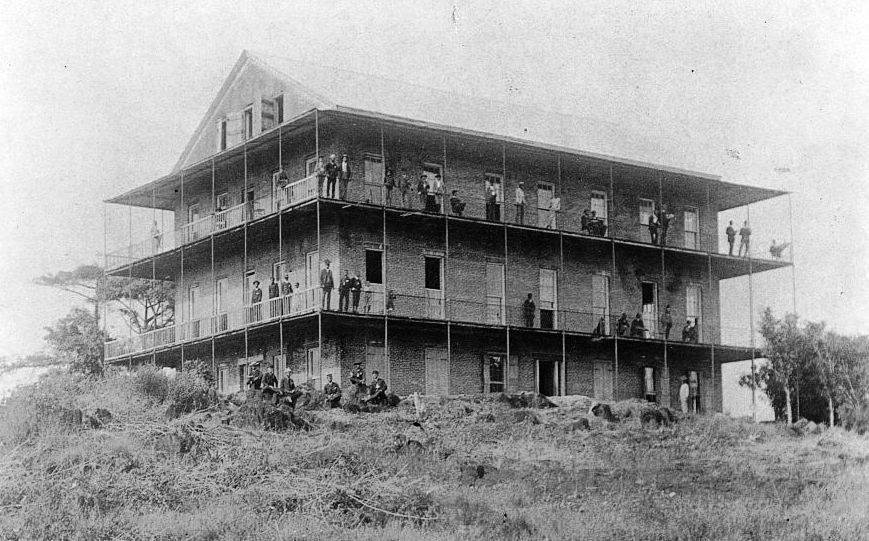
Liberia College in 1893

During the Civil War, Freeman became active in the African emigration movement. He moved to Liberia in 1864. He continued his work as a professor at Liberia College and was named as president of that college shortly before his death. Upon his death he was buried in Palm Grove Cemetery in Monrovia.

== In culture ==
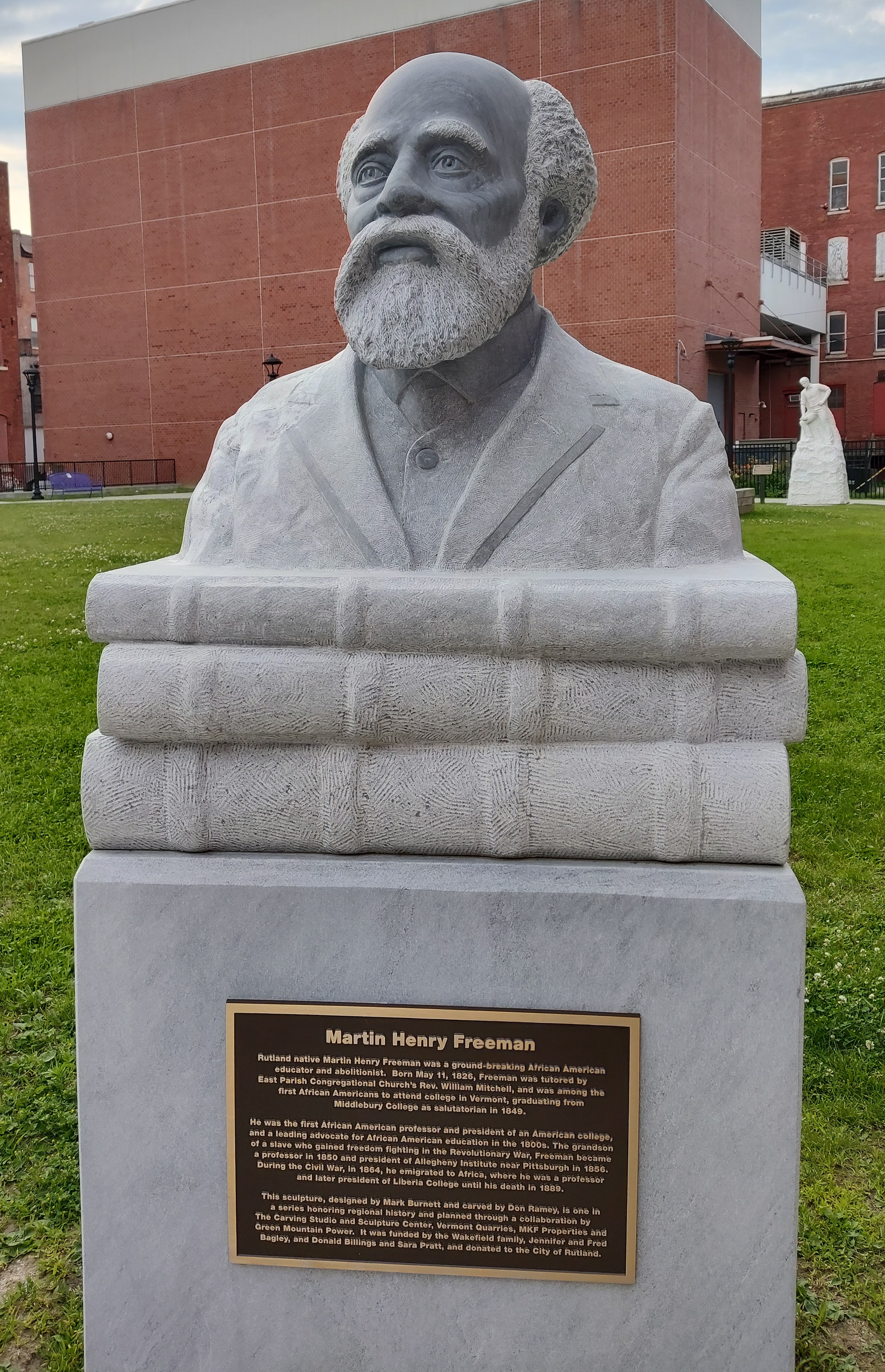
A statue of Freeman in Rutland, Vermont.

Dr. Russell Irvine of Georgia State University, author of The African American Quest for Institutions of Higher Education Before the Civil War: The Forgotten Histories of the Ashmun Institute, Liberia College, and Avery College (2010), wrote the first biography of Martin Henry Freeman. Titled Martin H. Freeman of Rutland: America's First Black College Professor and Pioneering Black Social Activist (1996), it was first published as an article in Volume XXVI, Number 3 of the Rutland Historical Society Quarterly and later appeared in Professor Irvine's book, The History of Black Higher and Professional Education.

The Anderson Freeman Resource Center at Middlebury College, a center that works to promote an inclusive and welcoming environment for the Middlebury community, especially for historically disadvantaged communities such as minority, first-generation college students, and LGBTQ people, is named in his honor.

A sculpture honoring him was installed in downtown Rutland in 2020.
