= Shiloh Baptist Church (Washington, D.C.) =

Coordinates: 38°54′35″N 77°1′27″W

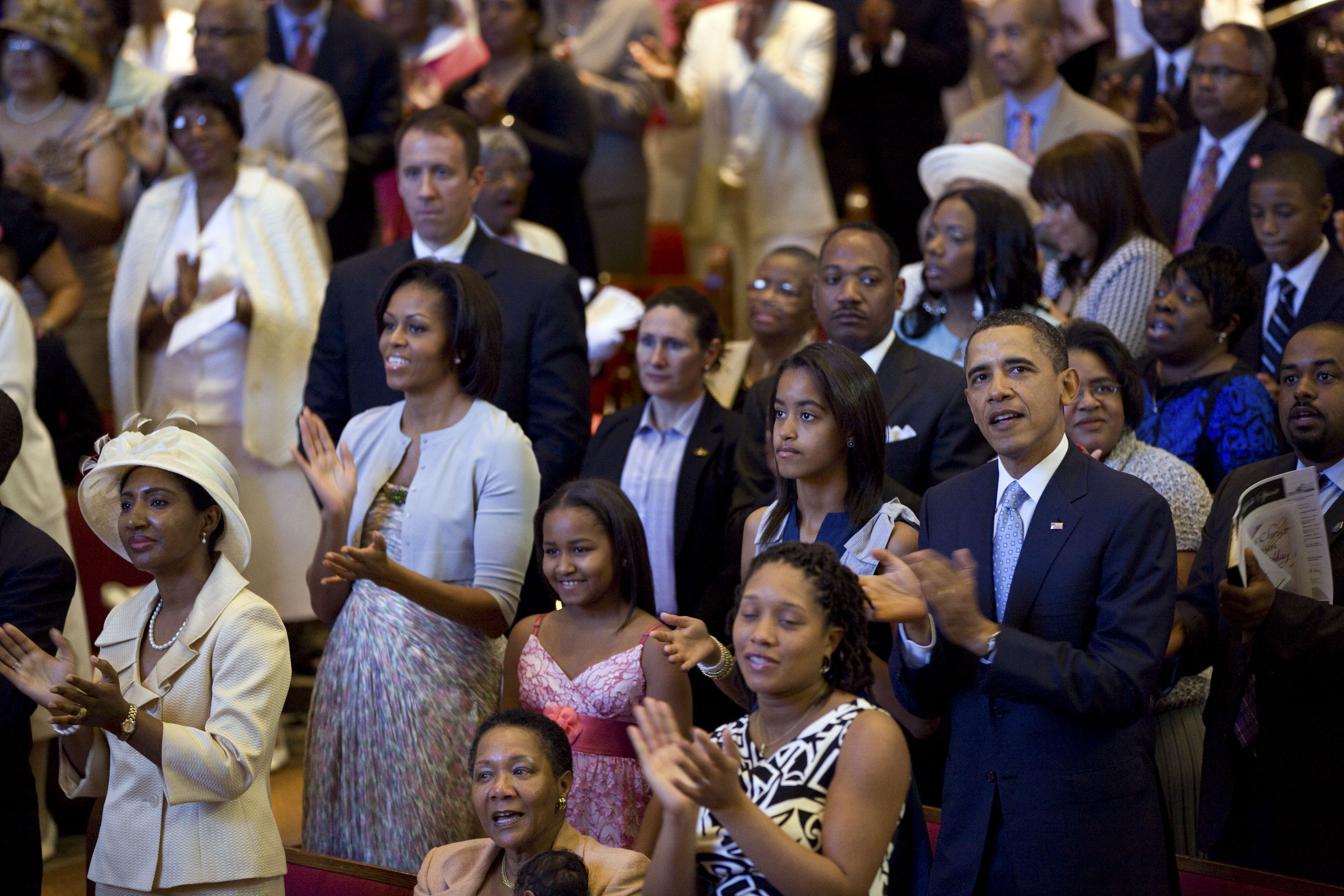
- Service with President Obama
- Shiloh Baptist Church (Washington, D.C.)
- Location: Washington, D.C.
- Country: United States
- Denomination: Baptist
- Website: shilohbaptist.org

History
- Founded: 1804

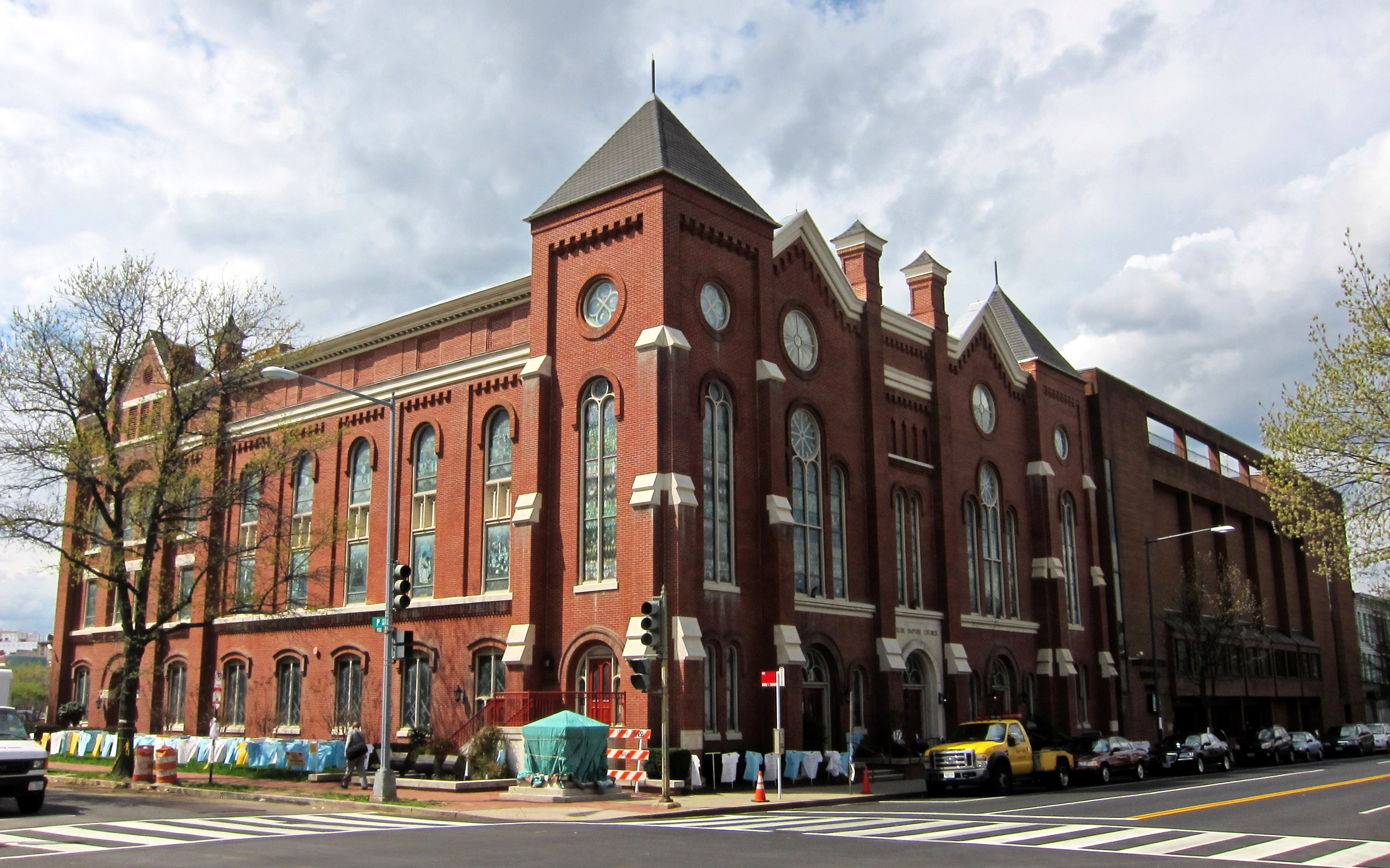
Shiloh Baptist Church in 2015

Shiloh Baptist Church is a Baptist church located in Washington, D.C. 20001 in the historic Shaw District. It is affiliated with the Lott Carey Foreign Mission Convention.

== History ==
=== Origins in Fredericksburg VA ===
The Shiloh Baptist Church was organized in Fredericksburg, VA by its white members in 1804. The church's membership included some free blacks but most were slaves. The black members were subjected to segregated seating. The church was sold to African American members in 1854, and this congregation was led by a white pastor.

=== Civil War ===
At the start of the Civil War in 1861, Shiloh had about 750 members. The Civil War disrupted the church's life but also brought the possibility of equality for blacks. The Shiloh religious services were discontinued when the Union Army wanted to use the church as a hospital because of a planned attack on Fredericksburg in June 1862.

The Union Army protected and helped the slaves and free blacks escape to Washington D.C. About 400 members of the Shiloh Baptist Church of Fredericksburg arrived in Washington D.C. Once in Washington D.C., they became free civilians in April 1862 when Congress emancipated the slaves of the District of Columbia.

=== Move to Washington, D.C. ===
In 1862, Sunday School directed by J. McCleary Perkins, a white Union soldier, met in shanty on L St NW between 16th and 17th Streets. White and black teachers gave instruction on religion and basic reading and writing.

In 1863, Shiloh Baptist Church granted recognition by council. Rev. William Walker elected first pastor.

In 1864, membership purchased building on L St NW between 16th and 17th.

In 1869, membership numbered 243. Purchased larger building with Fredericksburg funds.

=== Growth of the church at current location ===
In 1924, Shiloh moves to 9th and P Streets. L Street property sold for $60,000. 9th and P and adjacent property purchased in November 1924.

In 1945, first black church to unite with the Council of Church Women.

In 1950 Carter Woodson, a church neighbor, was a guest speaker for Negro History Week (an annual participation until his death).

In 1980, Ted Kennedy addressed the congregation of the church as part of his presidential campaign of 1980.

In 1991, a fire nearly destroyed the entire church building.

=== Presidential visits ===
President Ronald Reagan and his wife Nancy attended a performance of spirituals and gospel music, hosted by Leontyne Price in December 1983. The choir of Howard University appeared alongside Price; other performers included Lillias White, Kevette Cartledge, David Weatherspoon, and the Richard Smallwood Singers. It was broadcast as the 1983 Christmas Special of In Performance at the White House.

President Bill Clinton addressed the congregation as part of Al Gore's 2000 presidential campaign.

On April 24, 2011, President Barack Obama and his family attended the Easter Sunday service at the church, the first presidential visit to the congregation.
