= Samuel Edward Peal =

Liberian diplomat and politician

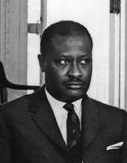

Member of the Senate of Liberia
- In office 1977–1980

Liberian Ambassador to the United States
- In office October 13, 1961 – 1976
- President: William Tubman; William Tolbert
- Preceded by: George Arthur Padmore
- Succeeded by: J. Urias Nelson

Liberian Ambassador to Guinea
- In office 1959–1962
- President: William Tubman

Liberian Ambassador to the Netherlands
- In office 1956–1959
- President: William Tubman

Personal details
- Born: February 3, 1923 Millsburg, Liberia
- Died: September 12, 1991 (aged 68) Arlington, Virginia, United States
- Education: Liberia College; Foreign Service Institute

Samuel Edward Peal, also known as S. Edward Peal, (February 3, 1923 – September 12, 1991) was a Liberian diplomat and politician.

== Early life and education ==
Peal was born on February 3, 1923, in Millsburg, Montserrado County, Liberia. He graduated from Central National School in White Plains, Liberia. In 1945, Peal earned a Bachelor of Arts degree magna cum laude from Liberia College. He later attended the Foreign Service Institute in the United States.

== Career ==
Peal served as town clerk of Millsburg. Peal's first diplomatic position was as first secretary of the Liberian Legation in Paris. He served in this capacity from 1947 to 1952. Peal then served as commercial attaché with the legation to London from 1952 to 1955. From 1955 to 1965, Peal served as consul-general to Hamburg. Peal first served as ambassador to the Netherlands from 1956 to 1959. Peal then served as ambassador to Guinea from 1959 to 1962. On October 13, 1961, Peal was appointed as the ambassador to the United States by Liberian President William Tubman. He presented his credentials to United States President John F. Kennedy on October 19, 1961. He served in this position until 1976. Peal was elected to the Senate of Liberia in 1977, and served in this position until 1980.

Through the United Methodist Church, Peal engaged in humanitarian work during the emergence of the First Liberian Civil War.

== Personal life ==
Peal was married to a woman named Florence Sherman. They had four children, Samuel Allen Peal, Rhoda Peal Samuel Edward Peal, Samuel Audiway Peal, as well as three grandchildren. Peal had a sister named Anna Pitts who was married to a man named Percy.

== Death ==
Peal died on September 12, 1991, in Arlington, Virginia, United States.
