= 1849 Liberian constitutional referendum =

A constitutional referendum was held in Liberia on 1 May 1849, alongside general elections. The constitutional changes would increase the number of members of the House of Representatives for Sinoe County from one to three. The proposals were approved by voters.

== Constitutional changes ==
Section	Original text	Proposed text
Chapter II, Article 2, Section 1	The representatives shall be elected by, and for the inhabitants of the several counties of Liberia, and shall be apportioned among the several counties of Liberia as follows: The County of Montserrado shall have four representatives, the County of Grand Bassa shall have three, and the County of Sinoe shall have one; and all counties that shall hereafter be admitted in the Republic shall have one representative; and for every ten thousand inhabitants one representative shall be added.	The representatives shall be elected by, and for the inhabitants of the several counties of Liberia, and shall be apportioned among the several counties of Liberia as follows: The County of Montserrado shall have four representatives, the County of Grand Bassa shall have three, and the County of Sinoe shall have three; and all counties that shall hereafter be admitted in the Republic shall have one representative; and for every ten thousand inhabitants one representative shall be added.
