= Colin Teage (missionary) =

Colin Teage (c. 1780 – 1839), sometimes written as Colin Teague, was an African American missionary and part of the American Colonization Society's settlement efforts in Liberia. He was a member of the First Baptist Church in Richmond, Virginia.

Born into slavery, he eventually bought his freedom and worked as a saddlemaker. He was recruited along with Lott Cary to establish a colony on the West African coast for resettlement of the growing population of formerly enslaved Americans. A missionary, he worked to establish a Baptist church in the colony of Liberia and to recruit native inhabitants. His son Hilary Teage became a prominent pastor, businessman, newspaper editor, and political leader in Liberia.

Efforts to establish a colony in Liberia proved difficult. Indigenous people refused to work for the colonists, and securing building supplies was rough in the hot and buggy climate. Teague reportedly expressed an interest in abandoning the effort.

He was married to Frances Teage. The family emigrated to West Africa in 1821 to help establish the colony of formerly enslaved people and other African Americans with support from the U.S. government, Christian organizations and enslavers. Other groups, including many free people of color, criticized the effort.
