= Lott Cary =

American-born Liberian minister (1780–1828)

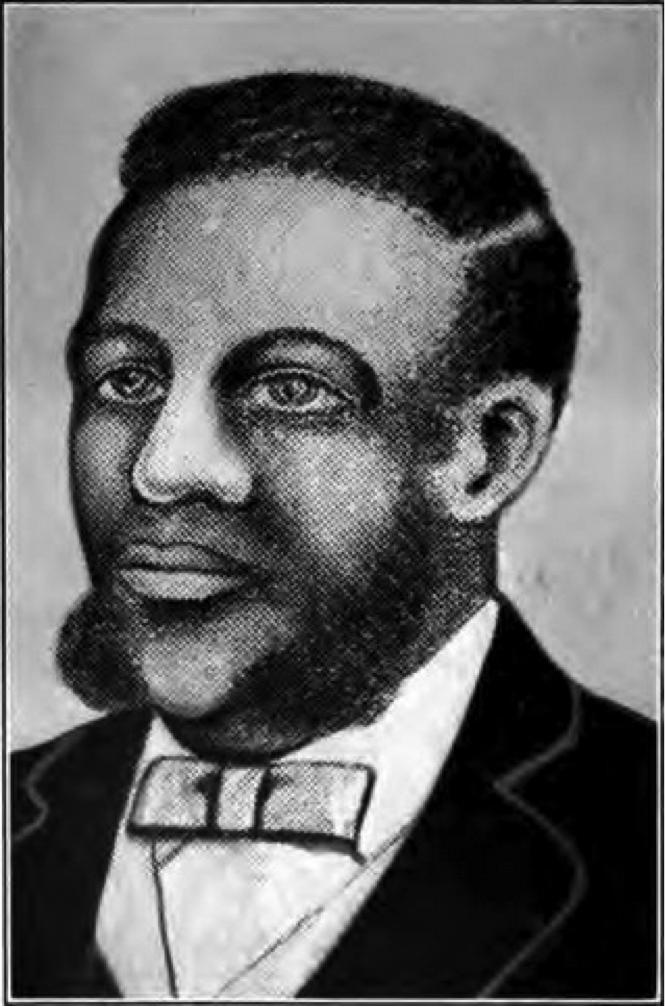
Lott Cary

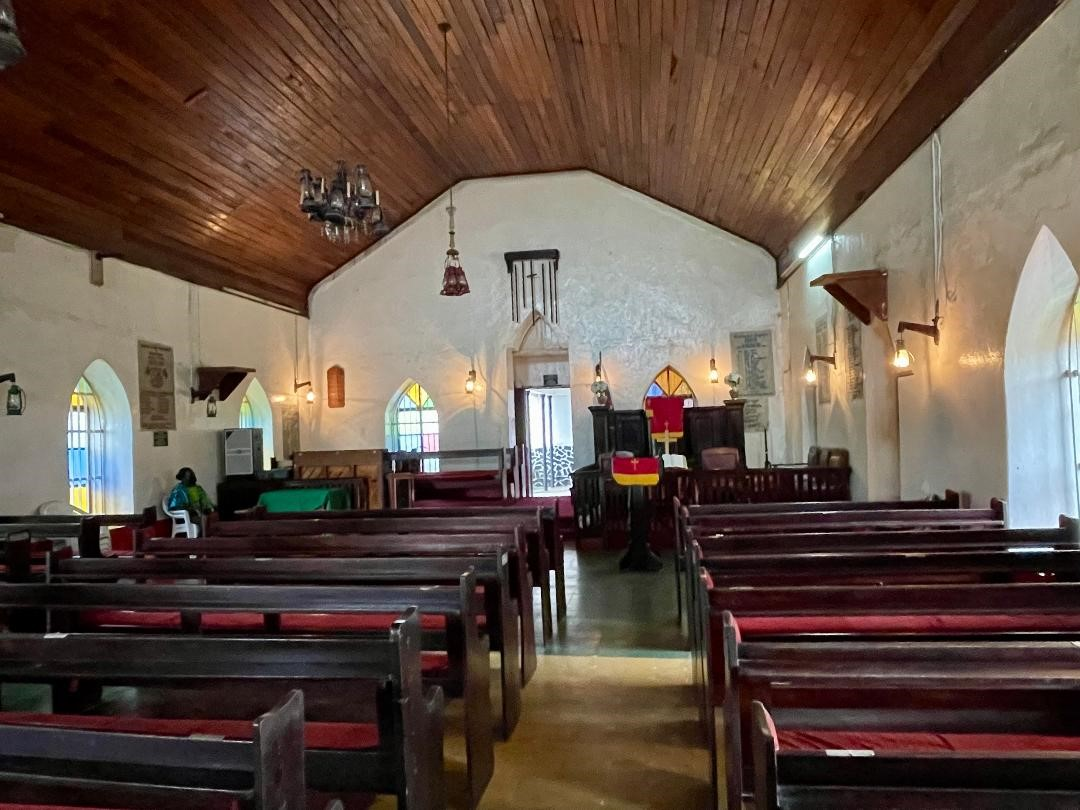
Providence Baptist Church's old sanctuary, site of the signing of the Liberian Declaration of Independence in 1847.

Lott Cary (also in records as Lott Carey and Lott Gary) (1780 – November 10, 1828) was an African-American Baptist minister and lay physician who was an early missionary in and founder of the colony of Liberia in West Africa in the 1820s. He founded Liberia's first Baptist church in 1822, now known as Providence Baptist Church, in Monrovia. He served as the colony's acting colonial agent from August 1828 to his death in November that year.

== Life ==
Born into slavery in Charles City County, Virginia, Carey purchased his freedom and that of his children at the age of 33 after saving money from being hired out by his master in Richmond. He became a supervisor in a tobacco warehouse, as the city was a major port for exporting that commodity crop.

He emigrated in 1821 with his family to the new colony of Liberia, founded by the American Colonization Society for the resettlement of free people of color from the United States. Cary was one of the first black American missionaries and the first American Baptist missionary to Africa. He established the colony's first church, founded schools for natives, and helped lead the colony.

== Early life and education ==
In 1780, Lott Cary was born into slavery and humble surroundings in Charles City County, Virginia, on the plantation of John Bowry.

In 1804, his master, a planter and Methodist minister hired Cary out in Virginia's capital city of Richmond, about 25 miles away. Bowry had arranged a one-year-long contract for Cary to work at the Shockoe tobacco warehouse.

In 1807, Cary joined the First Baptist Church of Richmond, a congregation that included whites and African Americans. During the second Great Awakening and religious revivals of this period, Baptist and Methodist preachers recruited enslaved people into their congregations. Cary was baptized by its pastor, John Courtney.

Cary learned to read the Bible and later attended a small school for enslaved people. Its twenty young men were taught by Deacon William Crane. He had come from Newark, New Jersey in 1812, opened a shoe store, and joined the First Baptist Church. Crane's students met three evenings each week to learn reading, writing, arithmetic, and the Bible.

Cary went from working as a common laborer to a shipping clerk and supervisor of a tobacco warehouse on Tobacco Row in Richmond. His master sometimes rewarded Cary with five-dollar bills from the money he earned. He was also permitted to collect and sell small bags of waste tobacco for his profit.

== Freedom and career ==
In 1813, Cary's first wife died. The same year, Cary used his savings to purchase his freedom and that of their two children for $850.

As a free man, he continued to be both industrious and frugal. He and his family stayed in Richmond; many jobs were available, and the city had a growing free black community. In 1813, Cary became an official Baptist minister. He also became a lay medical practitioner while in Richmond.

In 1815, he and Colin Teage helped form the African Baptist Missionary Society in Richmond.

== American Colonization Society ==
In the early 19th century, about 2 million African Americans lived in the United States, of whom 200,000 were free, mainly in the North. The Upper South states, especially Virginia, Maryland, and Delaware, also had more free blacks. For the first 20 years after the Revolutionary War, some enslavers freed the people they enslaved to uphold ideals of liberty and, in other cases, in response to the appeals of preachers active in the Second Great Awakening, who supported the abolition of slavery.

Believing that free blacks threatened the stability of their slave society, in 1816, Virginia politician Charles Fenton Mercer and the Reverend Robert Finley founded the American Colonization Society (ACS) intending to enable free blacks and formerly enslaved people to emigrate to Africa and establish a colony. By this time, most enslaved and free blacks were native-born in the United States, often for generations. They wanted to enjoy the rights of free people in the country where they had grown up and had family and social ties. Members of the ACS supported a goal of "repatriation" of blacks to Africa.

The Society was supported by a coalition of philanthropists, members of the clergy, abolitionists, and slaveholders. Those favoring abolition wanted to free enslaved blacks and provide them with the chance to go to Africa to escape continuing discrimination in the United States. The slaveholders wanted to expel free blacks from the South and the United States to remove what they perceived as a threat to the stability of their slave societies.

The ACS established the Liberia colony on the West African coast in 1819. Cary was among numerous free blacks who became interested in this movement. In 1819, The American Colonization Society published the Journal of Samuel John Mills along with “Letters from Africa to Persons of Color in the United States.” Cary's first biographer describes how the journal and letters, which invited "the free colored people of the United States to come and join them" produced "an immediate determination in Lott Cary and Collin Teague to remove to Africa."

== Colony of Liberia ==
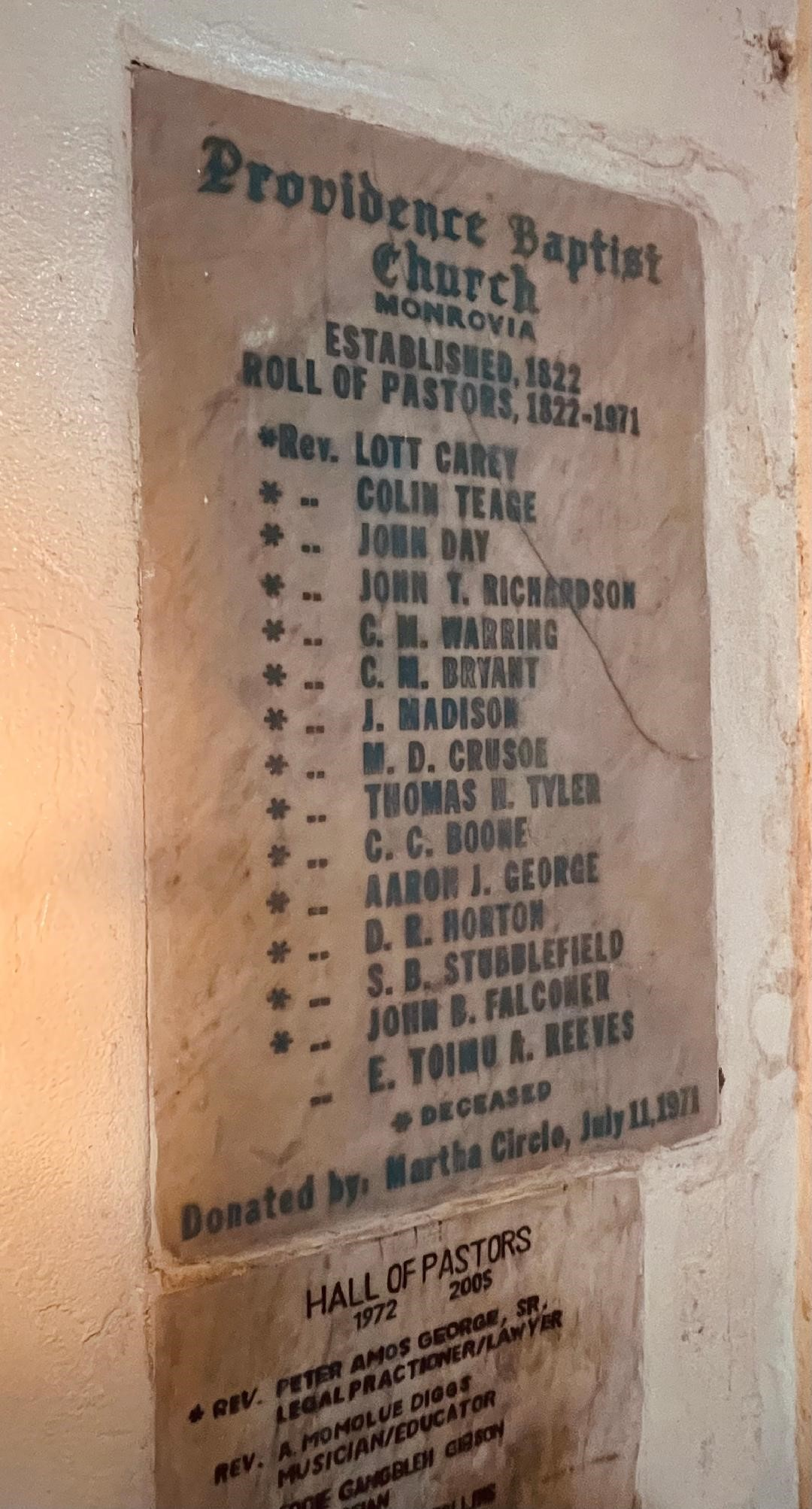
Carey on a list of pastors of his church

By 1821, Cary had paid for his and his second wife's expenses for transportation to the new colony of Liberia on the African coast. He was giving up his property, purchased in Henrico County, and a good income.

When asked why he would leave a community in which he was respected and led a comfortable life, he replied: 'I am an African, and in this country, however meritorious my conduct, and 'respectable' my character, I cannot receive the credit due to either. I wish to go to a country where I shall be estimated by my merits, not by my complexion; and I feel bound to labor for my suffering race.'

His work in Liberia was supported by the First Baptist Church of Richmond, the American Baptist Foreign Missions Society, and the African Baptist Missionary Society of Richmond, of which he was a co-founder. Cary became the first black American missionary to Africa.

Cary served as pastor, counselor, and physician in the new colony. His second wife died of disease shortly after they arrived in Liberia. He married again, but in its November 5, 1825 article about the colony and Cary's life, the New York Observer reported that Cary's third wife had died; she was "the daughter of Richard Sampson, from Petersburg, Virginia.

After arrival, Cary quickly established Providence Baptist Church in Cape Montserado. The settlement was later designated as the capital and renamed Monrovia. In 1822, he helped mount the defense of the new colony against 1,500 natives.

He died on 10 November 1828 two days after an explosion injured him and seven companions while they were making bullets.

== Legacy and honors ==
- The Lott Carey Foreign Mission Convention is based in Washington, DC.
- The Lott Cary House in Charles City County is a designated state historic landmark; it was added to the National Register of Historic Places in 1980. Today the much-altered house is used as a private residence. Virginia historical marker, V27-Lott Cary Birthplace, notes the site at the intersection of Virginia State Highways 155 and 602. Little is left of the original 18th-century house, which was likely John Bowry's plantation house. There is a strong oral tradition in the black community that this was Cary's birthplace. The site is marked historically to represent the man and his achievements and the significance of blacks in Virginia history.
- Careysburg, on the outskirts of Monrovia, was named for him.
- In 2015 Cary was honored as one of the Library of Virginia's "Strong Men & Women in Virginia History".

== See also ==
- History of Liberia
