= John B. Gripon =

Liberian legislator, pastor, and judge

John B. Gripon (1809–1847) was a Liberian legislator, pastor, and judge.

Gripon was born free in South Carolina, United States, in 1809. He was literate, and before emigrating to Liberia, he worked as a carpenter. In 1840, he was elected to the commonwealth legislature of Liberia representing Monrovia.

On July 26, 1847, Gripon was one of eleven signers of the Liberian Declaration of Independence. That same year, he served briefly as a judge for Montserrado County, head of the Methodist Conference Liberia Seminary, and a member of the Senate of Liberia for two months prior to his death.
