= James W. Lugenbeel =

American physician

- Born: 1819; Virginia, US
- Died: September 22, 1857 (aged 37–38); Alexandria, Virginia, US
- Occupations: physician, diplomat
- Spouse: Martha Alice Davy

James Washington Lugenbeel (1819 – September 22, 1857) was an American medical doctor, who worked for the American Colonization Society. He served as colonial physician in Liberia as well as an agent for the United States government. Lugenbeel's account of the 1847 Liberian constitutional convention in his journal became the only known record of the convention's proceedings.

== Biography ==
Lugenbeel was born in 1819 in Virginia. He married Martha Alice Davy in Alexandria, Virginia. On July 27, 1843, Lugenbeel was appointed colonial physician by the American Colonization Society (ACS). He was also appointed United States Government Agent for Recaptured Africans the same year. James Skivring Smith, future president of Liberia, received medical education under Lugenbeel before attending an American medical college. Lugenbeel set sail for Liberia on September 25, 1843, arriving in the colony on November 16. In December 1845, Lugenbeel succeeded in taking care of 756 recaptives, saved from a slave ship, after the duty was unexpectedly given to him. In April 1846, Lugenbeel returned to the United States due to ill health. He soon returned to Liberia. In 1847, when the Liberian constitution was being drafted, records of the proceedings were kept; however, they were later lost. The account of the proceedings kept by Lugenbeel in his personal journal are now the only known surviving record of the convention's proceedings.

On April 8, 1848, Lugenbeel was appointed a United States Commercial Agent. The same year, he was appointed the first United States consular agent in Monrovia. Lugenbeel once again returned to the U.S. in May 1849. In 1850, Lugenbeel published an account of his stay in Liberia entitled Sketches of Liberia, Comprising a Brief Account of the Geography, Climate, Productions, and Diseases of the Republic of Liberia. It was one of the earliest accounts of the country. The book was revised in 1853. Lugenbeel also had some of his writing published in the African Repository.

Upon his return to the U.S., Lugenbeel became recording secretary for the ACS. He served in this position until his death on September 22, 1857, in Alexandria. After his death, Thomas Sully painted a portrait of Lugenbeel. Sully began the portrait on April 13, 1864, and it was completed on April 26. It was presented to the ACS, and later given to the Historical Society of Pennsylvania.
