= Liberian Constitution of 1847 =

First governing document of independent Liberia

The Liberian Constitution of 1847 was the first constitution of the Republic of Liberia. Largely modeled on the Constitution of the United States, it remained in effect from its adoption on 26 July 1847 until its suspension by the People's Redemption Council, following the coup d'état on 12 April 1980.

== Colonial constitutions and compacts ==
=== Initial ACS constitution ===
The modern state of Liberia began with the 1820 arrival of settlers from the United States-based American Colonization Society (ACS), an organization whose goal was to set up a country in Africa for freeborn people of color and emancipated slaves.

The ACS created an initial constitution for the colony, which kept all governance of the colony in the hands of the ACS. It created a Board of Managers, composed of "agents" of the ACS, which would be in charge of handling "all questions relative to the government of the Settlement" and all disputes between Individuals". It anticipated a handover of governance to the settlers once the colony was settled. The settlers themselves agreed to an initial governing document, the Elizabeth compact, which was named after the ship they arrived on. No copies of this document remain today.

The Liberian capital, Monrovia, was founded in 1822. Named after then-President of the United States James Monroe, it reflected the colony's close relationship with the United States, which would be reflected in its government and governing documents. The 1820 constitution underscored this connection by stating that the settlement was under common law "as in force and modified in the United States".

=== The Liberian colonial constitution ===
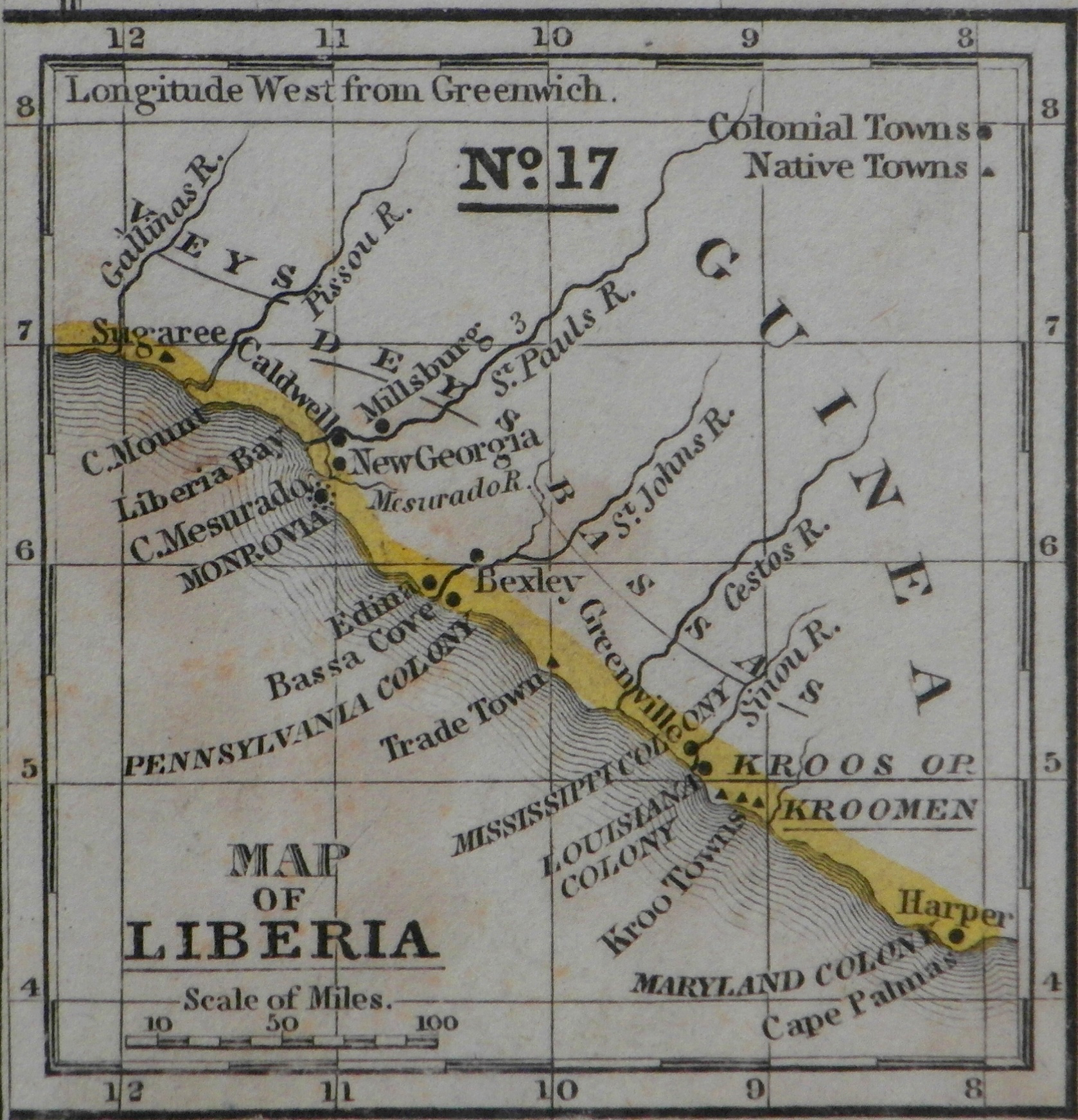
A 1839 map of Liberia, showing Monrovia near the western edge of the map, and various settlements established by state chapters of the ACS, including Pennsylvania, Mississippi, Louisiana, and Maryland

While the ACS directly led the settlement at Monrovia, state auxiliaries of the ACS created separate settlements nearby, which prompted the need for a revised governing system. Proposals to merge the colonies in the 1830s included an ACS-headed unitary state, or a federation of states under an Articles of Confederation-style government.

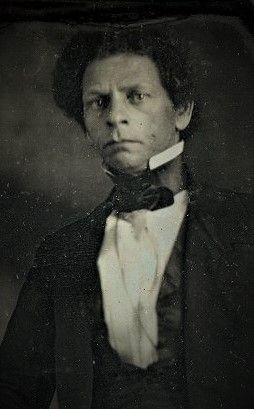
Joseph Jenkins Roberts, the last governor of Liberia as a colony, and its first president under the 1847 constitution

In 1839, after some of the state settlements merged with Monrovia to form the Commonwealth of Liberia, the ACS drafted a constitution and called a constitutional convention for the settlers to draft amendments to it. The Liberian assembly drafted a new constitution, but this draft was largely rejected by the ACS. The accepted colonial constitution maintained an ACS-appointed colonial governor, who had veto power over the locally-elected governing council, and who served as Chief Justice of the Supreme Court. Despite the ACS's continued control over the colony, this did represent an increase in self-governance, and when Joseph Jenkins Roberts became the first African-American governor of the colony in 1841, the desire for Liberian self-rule grew.

Liberia in the 1840s was in a state of governmental limbo, with some self-rule, some governance by a non-state colonization society (the ACS), and a poorly-defined relationship with the United States government. The U.S. government had funded and provided naval support to the colony but did not claim the colony or handle its foreign relations. In November 1846, a referendum was held to determine whether there was public support for creating a constitutional convention. The referendum passed with a slim majority but low voter turnout.

== Constitutional convention ==
Twelve delegates formed the constitutional convention in July of 1847. The proceedings of the convention are poorly documented. The records kept during the convention were subsequently lost, with the primary extant coverage based on the private diary of one delegate who considered the other delegates to be "universally deficient".

There were a variety of potential influences on the 1847 constitution, though limited documentation makes it difficult to determine which aspects of the constitution came from where. The ACS tried to influence the authors of the new constitution to protect the ACS's rights within the new nation. They also sent along recommendations from an American law professor, Simon Greenleaf. His suggestions may have formed an early draft of the constitution, but that draft was rejected, and many important aspects of the 1847 constitution do not fit with Greenleaf's or the ACS's desires.

The convention approved the Liberian Declaration of Independence on July 26, and the final form of the constitution on July 28. The constitution was approved by a September referendum, again with low voter turnout, but this time with a heavy majority. Only 269 of the estimated 600 eligible voters (Americo-Liberian men over the age of 21) cast ballots. The constitution was ratified 211-58, led by heavy support in Monrovia proper (which voted 111-0 in favor).

== Provisions ==
The 1847 constitution was influenced both by its previous colonial constitutions and the Constitution of the United States. Because of these influences, it is sometimes referred to as a replica of the U.S. Constitution. However, the Liberian constitution re-interpreted the American constitution in ways that reflect "the uneasy reconciliation of foreign constitutional ideals with local realities". Notable examples include its restriction of citizenship and land ownership to "persons of color", and its extension of economic rights to women.

The constitution created a unitary state, without the subnational units or federalism that the United States had in its constitution. Article I of the Liberian Constitution enshrined civil liberties similar to those protected by the Bill of Rights in the United States Constitution. Articles two through four laid out the powers of the three branches of government: the legislative (Article II), executive (Article III), and judicial branches (Article IV). Article V laid out additional provisions not covered in the other articles.

The executive branch was led by the President, elected by popular vote to a two-year term. All land-owning male citizens over the age of 21 were eligible to vote, and land ownership was also required to hold office. The constitution also specified the presence of five cabinet offices that were mostly within the executive branch, but with some obligations to the Legislature as well.

Legislative power was held by the Legislature, a bicameral body made up of a House of Representatives and a Senate. Both were elected directly by popular vote. The judicial branch was explicitly given the power of judicial review.

The 1847 constitution differed from its American predecessor on its treatment of various rights. The Liberian constitution was explicitly Christian, but also prevented the government from favoring any form of Christianity over another. Women were permitted to own property, even after marriage, though women were ineligible to vote. Discrimination against "tribal" Liberians (as opposed to the Americo-Liberians) was enshrined in law, as they were banned from most jobs and schools. They did not hold full citizenship rights, nor did they gain representation in the Legislature until 1873. Indigenous Africans were only granted the right to vote if they had "conformed to the forms, customs, and habits of civilized life" for three or more years.

== Legacy ==
The 1847 Constitution remained in force, with some amendments, until the 1980 Liberian coup d'état. After the People's Redemption Council took power in 1980, they suspended the constitution. The executive and legislative branches' powers were combined into the PRC, and the judicial branch was replaced by a series of "Special Tribunals".

The 1847 constitution was officially replaced in 1984, after voters approved a new Constitution of Liberia in a national referendum; Article 95(a) of the new constitution officially abrogated the old one.

== See also ==
- Constitution of Liberia
- Liberian Declaration of Independence
