= Administrative divisions of Liberia =

Liberian divisions

Map of the counties of Liberia

Liberia is divided into fifteen first-level administrative divisions called counties, which, in turn, are subdivided into a total of 136 second-level administrative divisions called districts and further subdivided into third-level administrative divisions called clans.

After its independence in 1847, and over the course of the nineteenth century, Liberia's administrative divisions grew from the original three counties — Montserrado, Grand Bassa, and Sinoe — to the addition of Maryland and Grand Cape Mount, extending along the windward coast between Cape Mount and Cape Palmas. Under President Arthur Barclay's administration (1904–1912), a new system was established in response to British and French demands that the Liberian government effectively occupy the territory Liberia had claimed. Three inland provinces were created — Western, Central, and Eastern — and each province was divided into several districts. The administrative districts were further sub-divided into clans. The districts were administered by the newly created office of district commissioner and the clans by the newly created office of paramount chief, all appointed by the president. In 1964, under President William Tubman's 'Unification' policy, the three inland provinces were disestablished, and the inland administrative divisions were reconstituted into four new counties: Grand Gedeh, Nimba, Bong, and Lofa, administered by superintendents who were appointed by the president.

In 1984, under President Samuel Doe, Grand Kru and Bomi counties were established. In 1985, two more counties were created: Margibi and Rivercess. The last two current counties were created under President Charles Taylor: River Gee in 2000 and Gbarpolu in 2001.

== Governance ==
The fifteen counties are administered by superintendents, and the districts by commissioners, all appointed by the president. The cabinet office with responsibility for the management of the superintendents, commissioners and chiefs is the Minister of Internal Affairs. The 1985 Constitution calls for the election of various chiefs at the county and local level. These elections have not taken place since 1985 due to war and financial constraints.

== Counties ==
There are 15 counties in Liberia.

Map #	County	Date Created	Capital	Area (mi^{2})	Population (2022 Census)	Parent County
1	Bomi	1984	Tubmanburg	749 mi^{2} (1,940 km^{2})	133,668	Montserrado County
2	Bong	1964	Gbarnga	3,386 mi^{2} (8,770 km^{2})	467,502	Bong County (Note: Formerly part of Central Province.)
3	Gbarpolu	2001	Bopolu	3,740 mi^{2} (9,700 km^{2})	95,995	Lofa County
4	Grand Bassa	1839	Buchanan	3,064 mi^{2} (7,940 km^{2})	293,557	Grand Bassa County (Note: Original administrative division.)
5	Grand Cape Mount	1844	Robertsport	1,993 mi^{2} (5,160 km^{2})	178,798	Grand Cape Mount County
6	Grand Gedeh	1964	Zwedru	4,047 mi^{2} (10,480 km^{2})	216,692	Grand Gedah County (Note: Formerly part of Eastern Province.)
7	Grand Kru	1984	Barclayville	1,503 mi^{2} (3,890 km^{2})	109,342	Maryland County
8	Lofa	1964	Voinjama	3,854 mi^{2} (9,980 km^{2})	367,376	Lofa County (Note: Formerly part of Western Province.)
9	Margibi	1985	Kakata	1,010 mi^{2} (2,600 km^{2})	304,946	Montserrado County
10	Maryland	1857	Harper	886 mi^{2} (2,290 km^{2})	172,202	Maryland County
11	Montserrado	1839	Bensonville	737 mi^{2} (1,910 km^{2})	1,920,914	Montserrado County
12	Nimba	1964	Sanniquellie	4,459 mi^{2} (11,550 km^{2})	621,841	Nimba County
13	Rivercess	1985	River Cess	2,159 mi^{2} (5,590 km^{2})	90,777	Grand Bassa County
14	River Gee	2000	Fish Town	1,974 mi^{2} (5,110 km^{2})	124,653	Grand Gedah County
15	Sinoe	1843	Greenville	3,913 mi^{2} (10,130 km^{2})	150,358	Simoe County

== Districts ==
- Bomi County
  - Dewoin District
  - Klay District
  - Suehn Mecca District
  - Senjeh District
- Bong County
  - Boinsen District
  - Fuamah District
  - Jorquelleh District
  - Kokoyah District
  - Kpaai District
  - Panta District
  - Salala District
  - Sanoyeah District
  - Suakoko District
  - Tukpahblee District
  - Yeallequelleh District
  - Zota District
- Gbarpolu County
  - Belleh District
  - Bopolu District
  - Bokomu District
  - Gbarma District
  - Gounwolaila District
  - Kongba District
- Grand Bassa County
  - Commonwealth District
  - District #1
  - District #2
  - District #3
  - District #4
  - Neekreen District
  - Owensgrove District
  - St. John River District
- Grand Cape Mount County
  - Commonwealth District
  - Garwula District
  - Gola Konneh District
  - Porkpa District
  - Tewor District
- Grand Gedeh County
  - B'hai District
  - Cavala District
  - Gbao District
  - Gboe-Ploe District
  - Glio-Twarbo District
  - Konobo District
  - Putu District
  - Tchien District
- Grand Kru County
  - Barclayville
  - Bleebo District
  - Bolloh District
  - Buah District
  - Dorbor District
  - Dweh District
  - Felo-Jekwi District
  - Fenetoe District
  - Forpoh District
  - Garraway District
  - Gee District
  - Grand Cess Wedabo District
  - Upper Jloh District
  - Lower Jloh District
  - Kpi District
  - Nrokwia-Wesldow District
  - Penicess District
  - Trenbo District
  - Wlogba District
- Lofa County
  - Foya District
  - Kolahun District
  - Quardu Gboni District
  - Salayea District
  - Vahun District
  - Voinjama District
  - Zorzor District
- Margibi County
  - Firestone District
  - Gibi District
  - Kakata District
  - Mambah Kaba District
- Maryland County
  - Gwelekpoken District
  - Harper District
  - Karluway District #1
  - Karluway District #2
  - Nyorken District
  - Pleebo/Sodoken District
  - Whojah District
- Montserrado County
  - Commonwealth District
  - Careysburg District
  - Greater Monrovia District
  - St. Paul River District
  - Todee District
- Nimba County
  - Boe & Quilla District
  - Buu-Yao District
  - Doe District
  - Garr-Bain District
  - Gbehlay-Geh District
  - Gbi & Doru District
  - Gbor District
  - Kparblee District
  - Leewehpea-Mahn District
  - Meinpea-Mahn District
  - Sanniquellie-Mahn District
  - Twan River District
  - Wee-Gbehy-Mahn District
  - Yarmein District
  - Yarpea-Mahn District
  - Yarwein Mehnsonnoh District
  - Zoe-Gbao District
- River Cess County
  - Beawor District
  - Central River Cess District
  - Doedain District
  - Fen River District
  - Jo River District
  - Norwein District
  - Sam Gbalor District
  - Zarflahn District
- River Gee
  - Chedepo District
  - Gbeapo District
  - Glaro District
  - Karforh District
  - Nanee District
  - Nyenawliken District
  - Potupo District
  - Sarbo District
  - Tuobo District
  - Nyenebo District
- Sinoe County
  - Bodae District
  - Bokon District
  - Butaw District
  - Dugbe River District
  - Greenville District
  - Jaedae District
  - Jaedepo District
  - Juarzon District
  - Kpayan District
  - Kulu Shaw Boe District
  - Plahn Nyarn District
  - Pynes Town District
  - Sanquin District #1
  - Sanquin District #2
  - Sanquin District #3
  - Seekon District
  - Wedjah District

== Clans ==
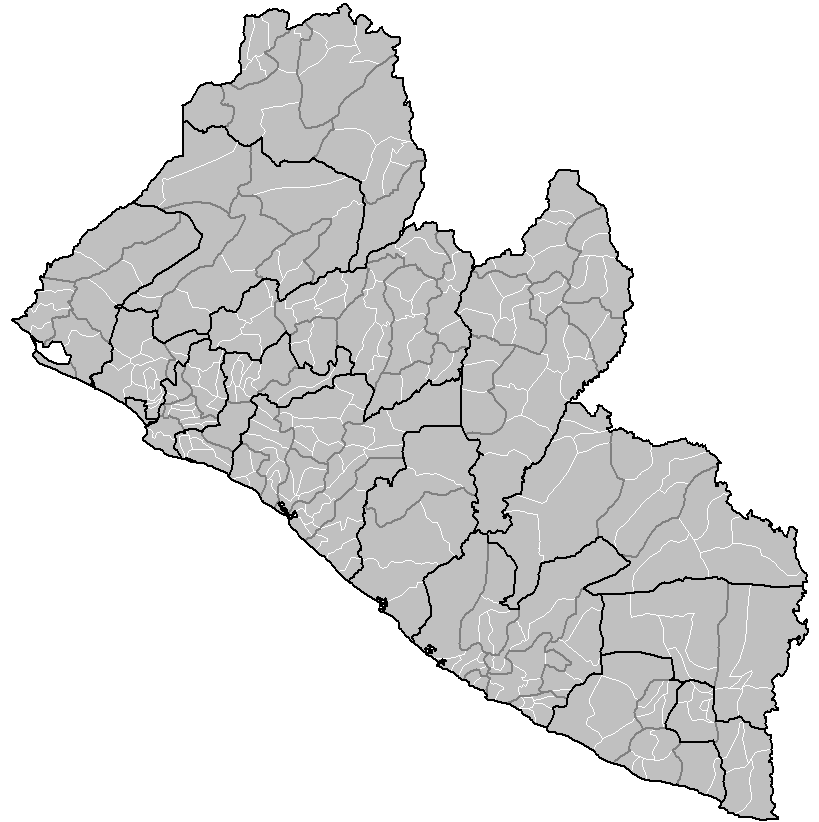
Clans of Liberia

The Clans of Liberia were local political units created by the central government as part of its efforts to extend its authority and influence into the interior of the country. As the tier of administrative government beneath the districts of Liberia, the clan structure only loosely corresponded to historic local political entities. Clans were legally recognized through legislation in 1905 and 1912. In a number of cases the clans, each under a chief, were combined under larger units called chiefdoms and headed by a paramount chief. Clans and chiefdoms were in some cases parts of a limited number of officially-recognized tribes. Under that system, indigenous Africans were regarded as corporate members of their respective groups rather than as individual citizens of Liberia. Clan land was owned communally and could be alienated only with the agreement of the chiefs. Over time, the units of clans and chiefdoms gradually merged into the state. The County Council, affirmed in the Budget Act of 2012, has now replaced informal town hall meetings and includes a broad representation of citizen groups, districts, chiefdoms and clans.

== See also ==
- Geography of Liberia
