= Bassa people (Liberia) =

Ethnic group in West Africa

Bassa
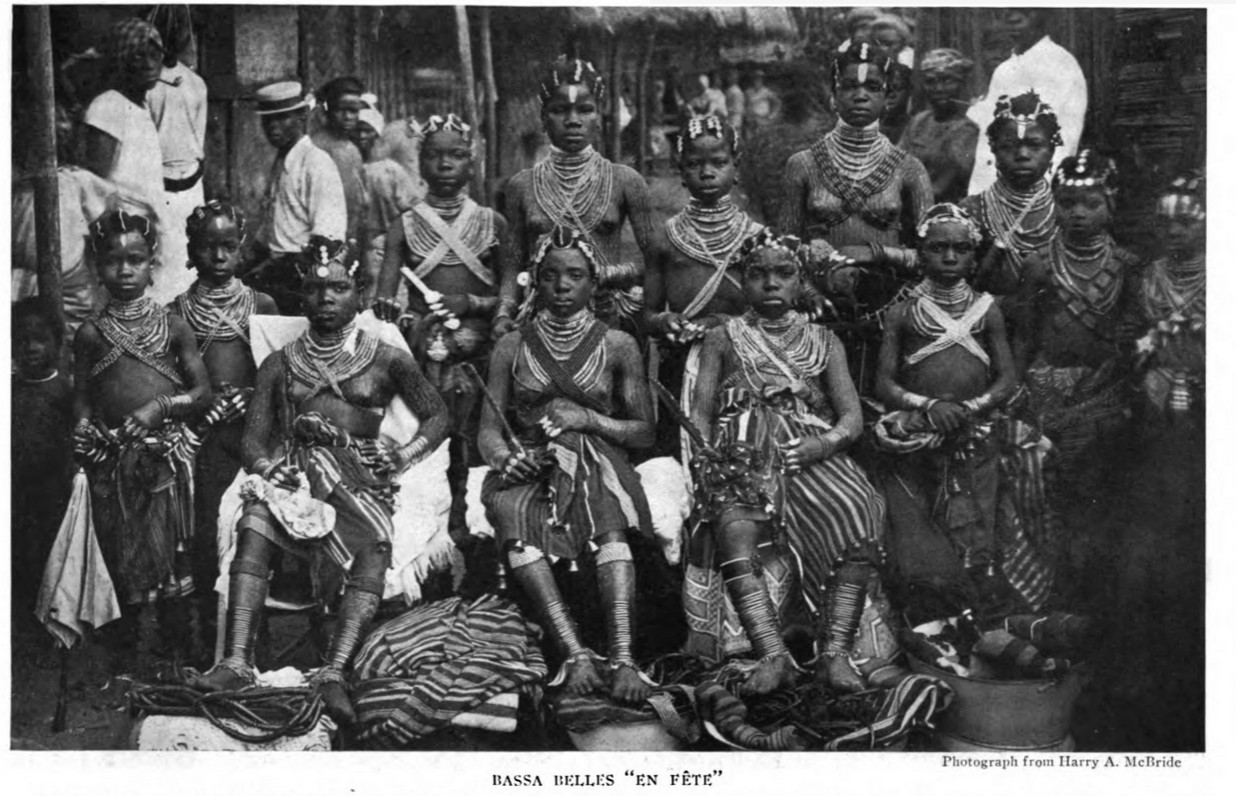
- Bassa women in 1922

Total population
- c. 1,141,500

Regions with significant populations
- Liberia: 900,000
- United States: 80,000-135,000
- Ivory Coast: 65,000
- Sierra Leone: 40,000
- Australia: 1,500

Languages
- Bassa, Kru Pidgin English

Religion
- Christianity

Related ethnic groups
- Krahn, Kru, Grebo, Jabo

The Bassa people are a West African ethnic group primarily native to Liberia. The Bassa people are a subgroup of the larger Kru people of Liberia and Ivory Coast. They form a majority or a significant minority in Liberia's Grand Bassa, Rivercess, Margibi, Montserrado and Bong counties. In Liberia's capital of Monrovia, they are the largest ethnic group at 20-21% of its population and they are the second to third largest tribal minority in Bong, at 3-9% of its population. With an overall population of about 1.1 million, they are the second largest ethnic group in Liberia (18%), after the Kpelle people (26%). Small Bassa communities are also found in Sierra Leone and Ivory Coast. They are also the largest or one of the largest Liberian tribes in the United States. The Bassa speak the Bassa language, which belongs to the Niger-Congo family of languages. They had their own pictographic writing system, but it went out of use in the 19th century. However, it was rediscovered by enslaved people in Brazil and the West Indies in 1890s, and it was reconstructed in early-1900 by Thomas Flo Darvin Lewis. The revived signs-based script is called Ehni Ka Se Fa. In local languages, the Bassa people are also known as Gboboh, Mani, Manidyu or the Koko people. But, their original name is Gbooh (Gbɔ̌ɔ̀), meaning People of the East. Oral history state that the Bassa people journeyed from the Northwestern Ivory Coast in the 8th-10th centuries, to Eastern Guinea in the 9th-11th centuries, to Grand Gedeh in the 10th-13th centuries, and to the coast by the 11th-14th centuries.

== History ==
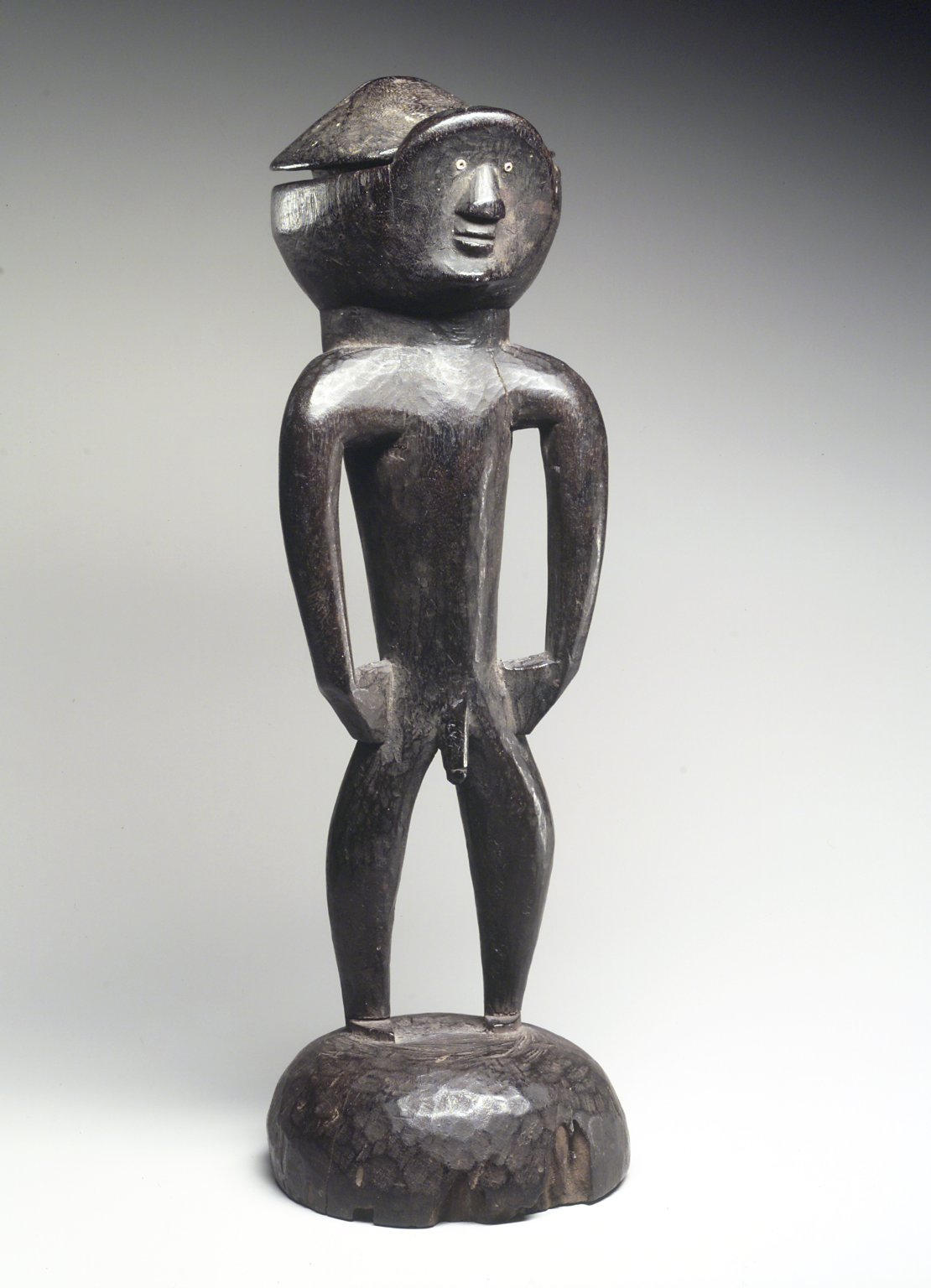
A lid carved from wood, embedded with glass by an early 20th century Bassa artist.

The linguistic evidence and oral traditions of these geographically diverse, small yet significant group suggests that their name Bassa may be related to Bassa Sooh Nyombe which means "Father Stone's people". Early European traders had trouble pronouncing the entire phrase, and the shorter form Bassa has been used in Western literature ever since.

Bassa, Krahn, and Sapo oral history sites that their journey from Ivory Coast began either before or during the subsequent collapse of the Nyanya (also spelled Nyanyan, Nahn, Jahn or Pahn, which means "secretive" or "within the sociery" in several Kru languages) Kingdom or State, in which the journey to the coast between the 7th and 17th centuries. It happened when the Krahn and Sapo began fighting over an artifact called the Dii and began fighting many skirmishes, and those skirmishes turned into large-scale battles, which caused more warriors to be killed in battle than legally allowed (usually 7 to 60+ depending on the scale of the skirmish), which caused an outrage among many of the Kru tribes. The Kuwaa were so distraught that they were the first to leave and isolated themselves in Gbarpolu and Lofa before being surrounded by Mande tribes. Next left the Bassa which now has much Mande influence, then the Krahn themselves, then the Kru, then the rest of the Kru tribes separated, now adhering to decentralized culture after proving that a centralized kingdom was too powerful. The Bassa now refer to all other Kru-speaking groups collectively as Nao Nyombe (Nao nyɔ ɓě.) Many leaders contributed to this journey, including Ɓǎ Gìà-xwí Sàwá, who helped the Bassa survive wars while the other Kru groups were fighting, Ɓǎ vɛ̀nɛ̀ (Great Father) who was one of the leaders who began the journey away from Nyanya (intermediate leaders led through Guinea and Grand Gedeh), and one of the most famous of them, Ɓǎ Sɔ́ɔ́ (Father Rock, from whom the Bassa inherit their name by Europeans), a strong-willed chief who was one of the first to trade with Europeans, known for his kind but firm iron fist on trade and powerful influence. So, those who would trade with those who come from outside of the tribe or land (Europeans mostly) would refer to themselves as Ɓǎ Sɔ́ɔ́'s people or Ɓǎ Sɔ́ɔ́ nyɔ ɓě, to make sure the merchants didn't decide to take advantage the Bassa traders. But, the Europeans took this to be their actual name and shortened it to Ɓǎ Sɔ́ɔ́(Bassa) for practical reasons and that name stuck to what it is today.

The Dan people, neighbors of the Bassa in Liberia, were especially attracted to brass jewelry. Dan women wore significant amounts of brass jewelry, as the amount of brass was directly correlated to their husband's wealth. Many Dan women would wear several pairs of anklets and bracelets that could weigh up to 8 pounds each. Until brass jewelry was banned in the late 1930s by Liberia's minister of health, Rudolf Fuszek, that claimed the brass jewelry was the cause of chafing infections and orthopedic problems. The sudden surplus of brass would be melted down and recast for other purposes. The Bassa people are likely responsible for producing some of these new uses for brass among the Dan. They were miniature brass cast masks called ma go, or "small head".

== Demographics and distribution ==
The Bassa territory has and is categorized into 15-17 distinct subgroups and dozens more clans (xwéɖé-dù), each with its own dialect and origin story.

The range of the Bassa range spans from the eastern borders of Bomi to the southern half of Bong's Electoral District 1 to the extreme western borders of Sinoe. The subgroup that encompasses Bomi, southern Montserrado, southern Margibi, and Owensgrove District are the Mambahn(Mabã̀a), known for being the first subgroup to enter Liberia and they also have many myths concerning them, the two main ones being that they are "short and stout" and that they "sold their land for smokefish", both of which are unlikely and not proven by data or history, but instead could stem from the Americo-Liberian era or trade with Europeans or the ACS and are now considered offensive and hurtful stereotypes. It also has its own subdialect spoken in Monrovia called Monrovia Bassa(Dúgbɔ̀-wùɖù). Another western subgroup are the Gibi (Gìɓii) who encompass almost all of Gibi District in Margibi, the western top half of Grand Bassa District 1 and Kakata. These two groups form the Western Bassa cluster.

The Hwengbarkon(Hwɛ̃-gbǎ-kɔ̃) encompass most of inland Grand Bassa's Grand Bassa District 1, Grand Bassa District 2, and Grand Bassa District 3along the Farmington River and their territory extends north into far southern Fuamah and the western fringes of the border between Gibi District and Grand Bassa District 2. On the coasts of Grand Bassa District 1, Grand Bassa District 2 and St. John River District, there are the territory and clans the Mehnwein (Gmɛwĩín) subgroup, and in Nekreen District and interior St. John River District there is the Nekreen Bassa or Níxwíníín (Ní = water, xwíníín = within, meaning). In the capital of Grand Bassa, Buchanan, there is the Gbehzohn Bassa (Gbɛ̌-zɔ̃̀) which might be a mix of most of the subgroups mixed together or a dialect by itself developed independently by Buchanan's status pre- and pro-1839. This subgroup also has presence in the greater Commonwealth. The Kor(Kɔɔ) Bassa inhabit the mid- to northern parts of Grand Bassa District 3 and the western half of District 4. They are known for their fast-paced tongue and their dialect is one of the hardest Bassa dialects to learn. The Central Bassa(it is debated whether they and Kor are the same or separate subgroups) inhabit the southern parts of Grand Bassa Districts 3 and 4 are most famous for their dialect being the most used in publications and Christian studies. It is also one of the most widespread subgroups, with significant presence in Monrovia. The subgroup with the widest range are the Gbor(Gbɔ̌ɔ̀) Bassa. They span from the eastern parts of Margibi and Grand Bassa District 2 (Gàɖàà-kɔ̃) all the way to Norwein(Nɔɔ́wĩín) District in Rivercess. The Gbor are also known for having the original name for the Bassa tribe. They also have the widest range of all Bassa subgroups. The most northern subgroup are the Kokoyah (Kókódyà) Bassa, who encompass the southern half of Bong Electoral District 1(Boinsen, Tukpahblee, and Kokoyah). These 7-8 groups make up the Central Bassa complex.

In District 4 of Grand Bassa, where Grand Bassa Electoral District 5 is located, there are three small subgroups: Gba Sor (Gbásɔ̀) and Kplor (Kpɔɖɔɔ) in the southeast and central east and Dorbor (Ðɔbɔɔ) in the northeast. Kor also has a presence in the west. The Gba Sor subgroup also has significant presence in Rivercess, encompassing over 80% of the Kpowein (Kpòwĩín) clan. The Rivercess Bassa or Nibue Kli/Nibuehnkreen(Níbũ̌ɛ̀xwíníín) dialect, who's people are referred to as the Nibuen or Nibuehn, is the most populous dialect in Rivercess and is most famous for being the most divergent of the Western-Central-Rivercess Bassa subgroups(or the core Bassa) and dialects, sharing many cognates with Western Krahn. They encompass Eastern and southern Norwein and the Eastern 3/4ths of Jo River District, the eastern half of Fen River District and the majority of the interior Doedain, Central Rivercess, and Zarflahn all the way to the Western fringes of Beawor and Sam Gbalor. There are also a mix of native and diaspora communities all the way to the Sanquin River. The subgroup's dialect is a dialect isolate and is also known for being "sweet on the tongue."Speakers of the Western and Central dialects often say that they have some trouble understanding some parts of the dialect, others more so. The two subgroups present in Northwestern Sinoe and Lower Nimba are the Gbii and the Dowlu (Ðɔwùɖù), which are the most divergent of any subgroup of Bassa. The smallest eastern subgroup is called the Beleto (Ɓeɖeto), and is spoken north of Rivercess in Doe District, Nimba County. It is unknown if the subgroup is still alive today as in the 1980s in a particular village it was said that most of the Bleto children had converted to speaking Bassa, with total speakers less than 40, but only in that village. It is unknown if it is extinct. The Dorbor have a presence in northeastern Rivercess, Southern Nimba and Bong, and Western Sinoe, with the most northern of the extensions extensions going into Boinsen District, and the Kplor and Dowlu in Southern Nimba(Gbii-Dowlu District. and Southern Bong County. These last six dialects compromise the Eastern Bassa cluster and the Rivercess cluster. The Bassa also have a relationship with the Dei people of Montserrado and Bomi, which are said to be an offshoot of Mambahn and a mix of Mambahn and Gola peoples.

They have had one of the highest and stable tribal fertility rates since the first census and first Liberian Demogratic Health Survey, currently at a rate of 5.12 as of 2026.

== Society ==
The Bassa people are traditionally settled farmers who grow yam, cassava, eddoes and plantain. They are lineage-linked independent clans who live in villages, each with a chief.

The Bassa people, before colonial occupation, had populations with occupational categories of farmers, barterers / traders, and lagoon fishermen. As well as a set of categories that had hierarchies based on practitioner skill, consisting of blacksmiths, carvers, weavers, potters, and other craftsmen.

The Bassa people acquired the Port Society and "Gree-Gree" bush traditions of education and initiation of children, from their neighboring Dei and Kpelle tribes.

The Bassa people are among those that practice the woman initiation society called Sande. (Also referred to as Bondo). The Sande / Bondo sub-culture is believed to be originated from the Mende people. The practice Sande (or Bondo), which consist of rituals involving special helmet / masks that some practicing cultures called Sowei / sowo. The masks themselves are not named, and Sowei / sowo refers to the title of the association official that wears the helmet mask. These types of masks are made by numerous cultures leading to some distinction in style, but the purpose of the helmet mask is always a representation of a primordial ancestor spirit that originates from a body of water during a sacred journey by a member or official.

== Religion ==
The traditional religion of the Bassa people has a moral and ethical foundation, one that reveres ancestors and supernatural spirits.

The Sande / Bondo helmet masks, worn by a society official during special ceremonies, represent the idealized beauty of a female primordial ancestor spirit, believed to reside in bodies of water.

Christianity arrived among the Bassa people during the colonial era, and the first Bible was translated into Bassa language in 1922. The adoption process fused the idea of Christian God with their traditional idea of a Supreme Being and powerful first ancestor who is merciful and revengeful, rewarding the good and punishing the bad. The traditional religion has included secret rites of passage for men and women, such as the Sande society.

The introduction of Christianity created a division between the inland forest Bassa that maintained Bassa traditional practices and rituals, and the Coastal Bassa, that converted to Christianity.

Numerous missionaries from different denominations of Christianity have been active among the Bassa people during the 20th century. These has led to many Bassa independent churches from Europe, North America, Africa and Evangelical movements. In contemporary times, the Bassa people predominantly practice Christianity, but they have retained elements of their traditional religion.

== Village Layout and Architecture ==
Inland Forest Bassa took extra consideration to the location and layout of villages. The choice of location is determined by simple factors, access to fresh water, good farmland, and the presence of certain reeds for use as roofing material.

The layout of the village appears to be disorganized clusters of huts placed seemingly at random but is actually very intentional. The village layout is arranged in such a way, looking in any direction one's line of sight is interrupted by huts, this inability to get bearings as an outsider is specifically for spies and attackers, as they would get lost easily, giving the Bassa, familiar with their own village an advantage. A Bassa village with this layout lacks any sort of main road and do include several empty 'lots' making traveling through the village intentionally difficult and confusing for outsiders.

== Art ==
During the late 1930s, the brass jewelry the Dan wore was banned, the surplus brass from the jewelry was melted down and recast for other things. One of those things were created by the Bassa for the Dan. Those were ma go, "small head", miniature masks that featured protruding open lips, flared nostrils, and pierced slit eyes, as well as a tattoo pattern from forehead to chin.

Another brass work of the Bassa people is the Brass Finial. the Brass Finial is an iron rod that had brass cast over it. the top of the staff features a woman's head, with five rows of hair that run from front to back, as well as an encircling herringbone pattern. According to Bassa legend, the staff was the walking stick of a mythical ancestor by the name of Sma Vlen. Who was believed to have migrated towards the coast during the 16th century.

Bassa Masks were wood carved and are distinguished from neighboring peoples own masks through a style that gives the masks angular faces. With the mask, the wearer would also wear a braided bonnet, fastened at an angle to the forehead.

Other Bassa Masks have perorated eyes but are not worn directly on the face of the performer, but rather fastened to the forehead area of a weaved basket that is worn by the performer.

Bassa Masks have a hierarchy based on the purpose that each mask is meant to fulfill, whether it be private or for a ritual. One type of Bassa masks are made with the intent of projecting reverence and fear with monstrous face with protruding eyes, swollen lips and contorted human and animal features. These masks depict the likeness of spirits from the darkest parts of the forest.

The next type of mask are the portrait masks created exclusively by skilled carvers following tribal sculptural laws passed down by masters of the craft for generations. These masks are made to embody the defined concepts of beauty, within this category are ancestor masks, meant to give leniency, be at peace, and promise peace to heirs. these masks are deliberately made to not resemble specific individuals.

An exception to the making of a mask that resembles a specific individual came when there was a need to accustom the people of a village to the disfigurement of someone. A mask in their likeness was made and used by a performer that danced with crowds and told jokes, giving the features of the individual's disfigurement positive association, as part of deliberate act of social to prevent a member of the village from becoming an outcast.

Another type of portrait masks, known in English as "devil" masks are worn by soothsayers and various performers like acrobats and jugglers, and said wearers are agents of social control.

== Sources ==
- Gordon, Raymond G., Jr. (ed.), 2005. Ethnologue: Languages of the World, Fifteenth edition. Dallas, Tex.: SIL International. Online version.
- Somah, Syrulwa (2003), Nyanyan Gohn-Manan History, Migration and Government of the Bassa; Lightning Source Inc.
