= Clay-Ashland =

Village in Montserrado County, Liberia

- Township
- Location in Liberia
- Coordinates: 6°25′21″N 10°43′29″W
- Country: Liberia
- County: Montserrado County
- District: St. Paul River
- Established: 1846
- Time zone: UTC+0 (GMT)

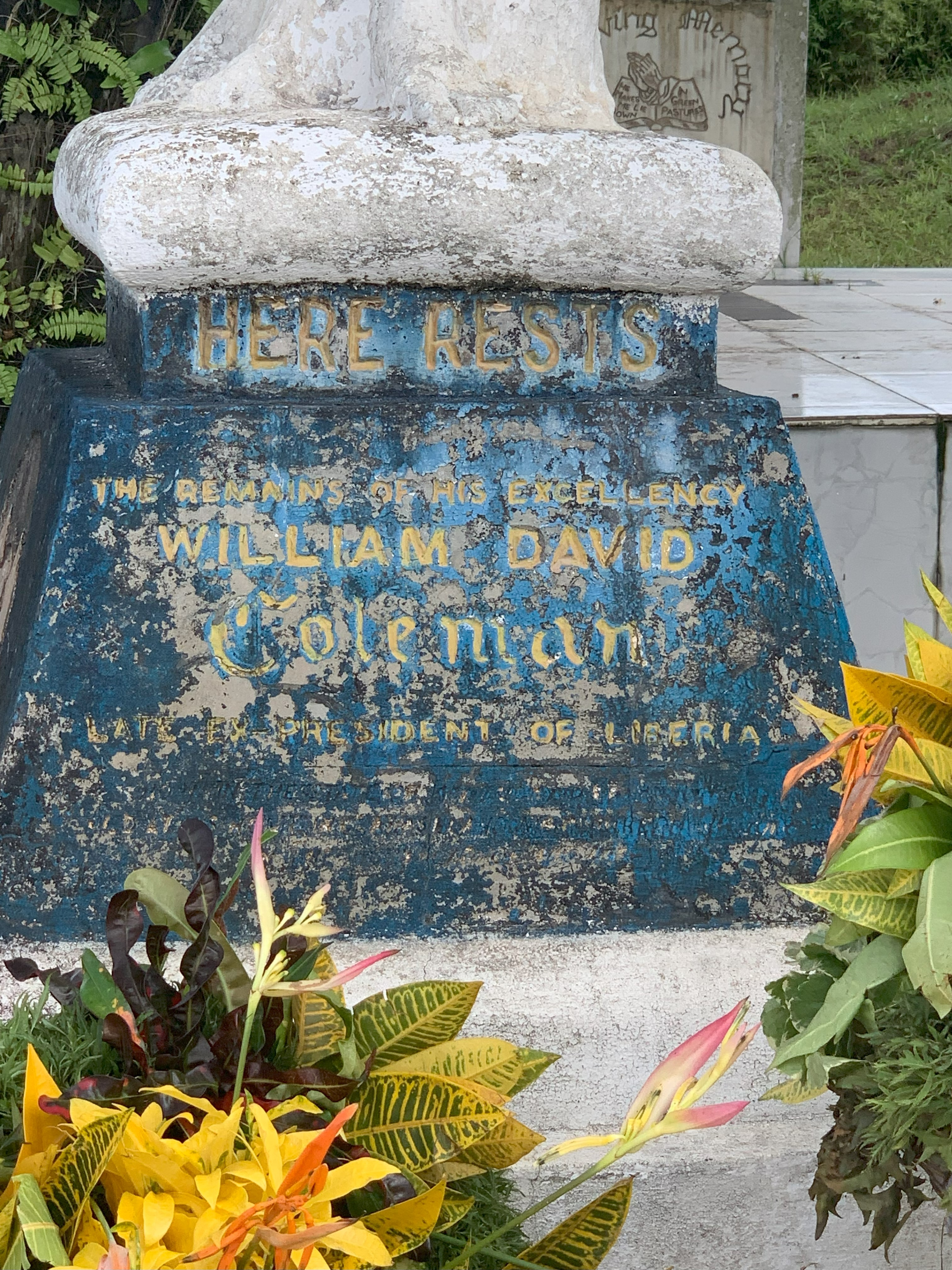
President Coleman's grave.

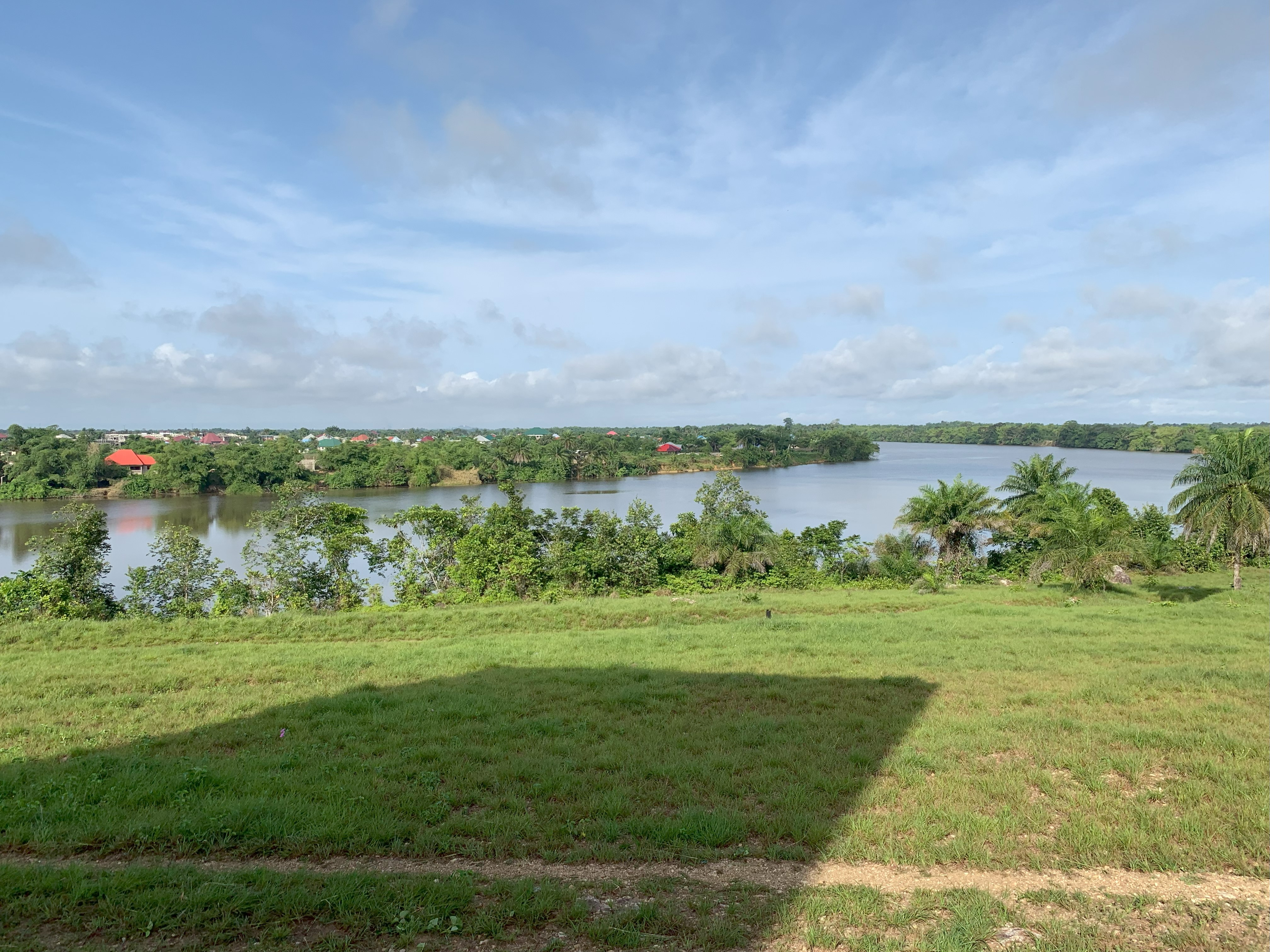
St. Paul River near Clay Ashland

Clay-Ashland is a township located 10 miles (16 km) from the capital city of Monrovia in Liberia. The town is in the St. Paul River District of Montserrado County. It is named after Henry Clay — a slaveowner and American Colonization Society co-founder who favored gradual emancipation — and his estate Ashland in Lexington, Kentucky.

Established in 1846, Clay-Ashland was part of a colony called Kentucky In Africa, because it was settled by African-American immigrants primarily from the U.S. state of Kentucky under the auspices of the American Colonization Society.

== History ==
A Kentucky state affiliate of the ACS was formed in 1828, and members raised money to transport Kentucky blacks — freeborn volunteers as well as slaves set free on the stipulation that they leave the United States — to Africa. The Kentucky society bought a 40-square-mile (100 km^{2}) site along the Saint Paul River and named it Kentucky in Africa. Clay-Ashland was the colony's main town.

Notable residents have included William D. Coleman, the 13th President of Liberia, whose family settled in Clay-Ashland after immigrating from Fayette County, Kentucky, United States when he was a boy. Moses Ricks, a successful farmer and Baptist missionary who founded the still-running Ricks Institute in 1887 to provide a Christian education to indigenous youth in Liberia, also grew up in the town. Alfred Francis Russell, the 10th President of Liberia, also resided in Clay-Ashland. Martha Ann Erskine Ricks lived here after her father bought her out of slavery. In 1892 she received a Royal audience with Queen Victoria.

The True Whig Party, which dominated Liberian politics for more than a century, was founded in Clay-Ashland in 1869.
