= Bandela =

Village in Grand Cape Mount County, Liberia

- Location in Liberia
- Coordinates: 7°9′59″N 10°55′53″W
- Country: Liberia
- County: Grand Cape Mount County
- District: Garwula

Bandelє (Bandela, Bandele, Bandeleh) is a village Garwula District, Grand Cape Mount, in north-west Liberia.

As of January 2006 the population was approximately 1,165. The area was settled by the Bande clan of the Mende people. Residents speak a dialect of the Mende language (Mєnde yia) called Bandi. However, the language of school instruction and local administration is Liberian English. The area contains several abandoned small scale mines. Bandelє sometimes serves as an informal trading post due to its proximity to the Sierra Leone border and the major road to Sierra Leone's diamond mining region. The area suffered during both the Liberian Civil War and the Sierra Leone Civil War. Currently, the United Nations Mission in Liberia (UNMIL) provides most security and other basic services.
