= Sanniquellie-Mah District =

Sanniquellie Mah District is one of six districts located in Nimba County, Liberia.
