= Greenville, Liberia =

Greenville City
- Location in Liberia
- Coordinates: 5°01′N 9°02′W
- Country: Liberia
- County: Sinoe County
- District: Greenville District

Population (2008)
  - Total: 16,434
- Climate: Af

Greenville is the capital of Sinoe County in southeastern Liberia and lies on a lagoon near the Sinoe River and the Atlantic Ocean. It is located about 150 miles (240 km) southeast of Monrovia. As of the 2008 national census, the population stood at 16,434.

A hoard of bronze Kru currency rings discovered in the Sinoe river at Greenville is now in the British Museum.

The town was built in about 1838 by colonists of the Mississippi Colonization Society. Part of what was then the Mississippi-in-Africa colony (now Sinoe County), Greenville was named after James Green, a Jefferson County Judge and one of the first Mississippi Delta planters to send a group of former slaves to Liberia.

The town was destroyed in the Liberian Civil War but has since been rebuilt around a port for the local logging industry. Before the civil war, the town's main exports were lumber, rubber, and agricultural products.

The Sapo National Park lies near the town. Boats sail from Greenville to Monrovia and Harper.

Greenville experiences on average 185 rainy days per year. The mean temperature of the town's coolest month is 24 degrees Celsius and 27 degrees Celsius for its warmest month.

Greenville has the third-largest port in Liberia. The port has two quays (70 m and 180 m long, respectively) on the inner side of the breakwater for berthing facilities, with an existing water depth of 6 m below chart datum.
