= Districts of Liberia =

The counties of Liberia are subdivided into 136 administrative districts and 68 electoral districts.

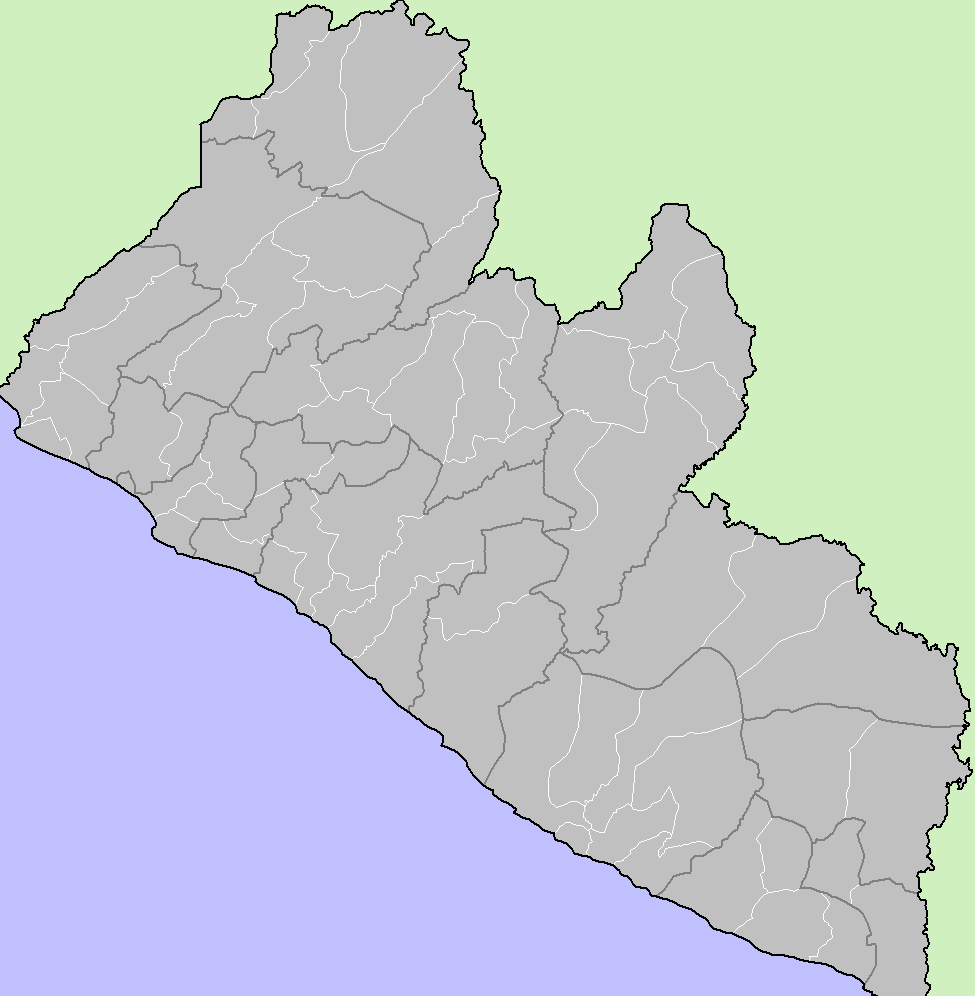
Districts of Liberia

County	District	Population
Bomi	Dowein	28,731
Bomi	Klay	25,720
Bomi	Senjeh	52,740
Bomi	Suehn Mecca	16,219
Bomi	Tehr	10,655
Bong	Boinsen	17,254
Bong	Fuamah	35,055
Bong	Jorquelleh	145,235
Bong	Kokoyah	4,012
Bong	Kpaai	29,806
Bong	Panta-Kpa	19,853
Bong	Salala	52,928
Bong	Sanayea	39,467
Bong	Suakoko	44,930
Bong	Tukpahblee	13,120
Bong	Yeallequelleh	43,695
Bong	Zota	22,206
Gbarpolu	Belleh	15,214
Gbarpolu	Bopolu	23,758
Gbarpolu	Bokomu	13,684
Gbarpolu	Gbarma	13,845
Gbarpolu	Kongba	11,508
Grand Bassa	Commonwealth	35,740
Grand Bassa	District #1	30,223
Grand Bassa	District #2	32,565
Grand Bassa	District #3	62,421
Grand Bassa	District #4	41,162
Grand Bassa	Nekreen	62,883
Grand Bassa	St. John River	14,723
Grand Cape Mount	Commonwealth	6,547
Grand Cape Mount	Garwula	26,936
Grand Cape Mount	Gola Konneh	23,518
Grand Cape Mount	Porkpa	42,615
Grand Cape Mount	Tewor	27,460
Grand Gedeh	Gbarzon	74,255
Grand Gedeh	Konobo	50,161
Grand Gedeh	Tchien	31,976
Grand Kru
Grand Kru	Barclayville	-
Grand Kru	Bleebo	-
Grand Kru	Bolloh	-
Grand Kru	Buah	-
Grand Kru	Dorbor	-
Grand Kru	Dweh	-
Grand Kru	Felo-Jekwi	-
Grand Kru	Fenetoe	-
Grand Kru	Forpoh	-
Grand Kru	Garraway	-
Grand Kru	Gee	-
Grand Kru	Grand Cess Wedabo	-
Grand Kru	Upper Jloh	-
Grand Kru	Lower Jloh	-
Grand Kru	Kpi	-
Grand Kru	Nrokwia-Wesldow	-
Grand Kru	Penicess	-
Grand Kru	Trenbo	-
Grand Kru	Wlogba	-
Lofa	Foya	73,312
Lofa	Kolahun	59,057
Lofa	Salayea	23,578
Lofa	Vahun	17,137
Lofa	Voinjama	42,790
Lofa	Quardu Gboni	-
Lofa	Zorzor	40,704
Margibi	Firestone	61,988
Margibi	Gibi	14,250
Margibi	Kakata	88,704
Margibi	Mambah-Kaba	44,981
Maryland	Barrobo	-
Maryland	Pleebo/Sodeken	-
Montserrado	Careysburg	29,712
Montserrado	Commonwealth	11,876
Montserrado	Greater Monrovia	970,824
Montserrado	St. Paul River	71,831
Montserrado	Todee	33,998
Nimba	Boe & Quilla	18,262
Nimba	Buu-Yao	40,007
Nimba	Doe	35,918
Nimba	Garr Bain	61,225
Nimba	Gbehlageh	32,176
Nimba	Gbi & Doru	10,131
Nimba	Gbor	99,875
Nimba	Kparblee	11,424
Nimba	Leewehpea-Mahn	24,747
Nimba	Meinpea-Mahn	24,157
Nimba	Sanniquellie-Mahn	25,370
Nimba	Twan River	37,479
Nimba	Wee-Gbehy-Mahn	32,934
Nimba	Yarmein	22,718
Nimba	Yarpea Mahn	21,647
Nimba	Yarwein Mehnsonnoh	25,584
Nimba	Zoe-Gbao	29,372
River Gee	Chedepo	10,518
River Gee	Gbeapo	10,934
River Gee	Glaro	4,992
River Gee	Karforh	5,956
River Gee	Nanee	6,002
River Gee	Nyenawliken	5,159
River Gee	Nyenebo	5,703
River Gee	Potupo	7,337
River Gee	Sarbo	5,320
River Gee	Tuobo	4,868
River Gee	Webbo	-
Rivercess	Bearwor	3,854
Rivercess	Central RiverCess	8,303
Rivercess	Doedain	13,041
Rivercess	Fen River	12,630
Rivercess	Jo River	8,921
Rivercess	Norwein	13,900
Rivercess	Sam Gbalor	3,714
Rivercess	Zartlahn	7,146
Sinoe	Bodae	3,030
Sinoe	Bokon	4,417
Sinoe	Butaw	3,892
Sinoe	Dugbe River	9,083
Sinoe	Greenville	16,434
Sinoe	Jaedae	3,617
Sinoe	Jaedepo	8,596
Sinoe	Juarzon	6,151
Sinoe	Kpayan	10,043
Sinoe	Kulu Shaw Boe	8,555
Sinoe	Plahn Nyarn	6,805
Sinoe	Pynes Town	4,167
Sinoe	Sanquin District 1	2,118
Sinoe	Sanquin District 2	3,405
Sinoe	Sanquin District 3	3,174
Sinoe	Seekon	7,184
Sinoe	Wedjah	1,076

== See also ==
- Counties of Liberia
- Administrative divisions of Liberia

== Sources ==
- "Republic of Liberia : 2008 National Population and Housing Census Final Results" (PDF). emansion.gov.lr. 2008. Archived from the original (PDF) on 3 May 2019.
- "2022 Liberia Population and Housing Census : Final Results" (PDF). Liberia Institute of Statistics and Geo-Information Service. June 2023. Archived (PDF) from the original on 25 February 2026.
