= Bokon (disambiguation) =

Bokon may refer to:

- Bokon, a lake in Khabarovsk Krai, Russia
- Princess Bokon (1818 - 1832), a Korean princess
- Bokon District, an administrative division of Liberia
