= Bong-1 =

Liberian House of Representatives electoral district

- Constituency for the House of Representatives of Liberia
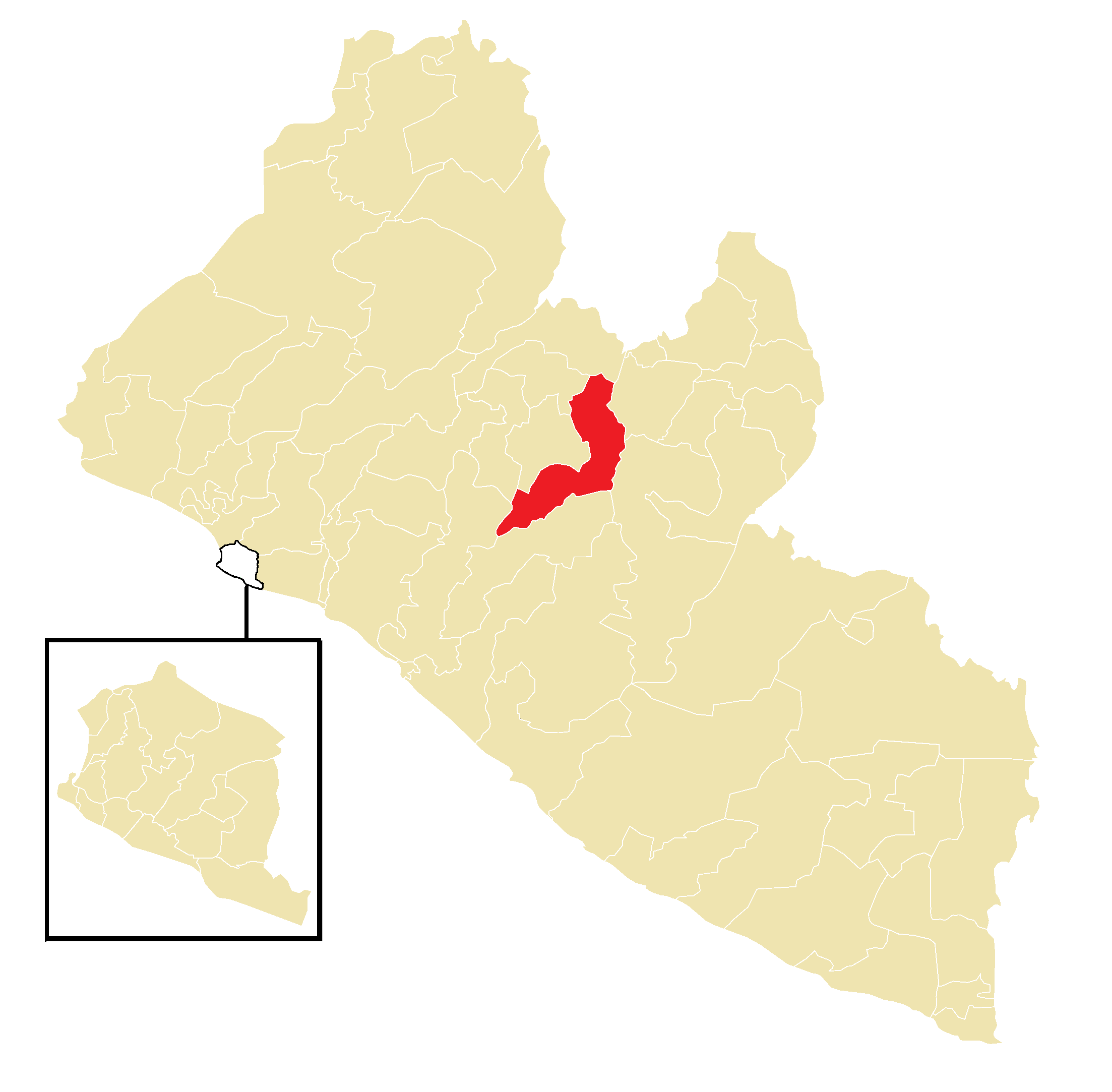
- Electorate: 37,046 (2023)

Current constituency
- Created: 2011
- Representative: Prince K. Koinah

Bong-1 is an electoral district for the elections to the House of Representatives of Liberia. The constituency covers Kpaai District, Boinsen District, Tukpahblee District and Kokoyah District.

== Elected representatives ==
Year	Representative elected	Party	Notes
2005	Corpu G. Barclay	UP	
2011	Tokpah J. Mulbah	CDC	
2017	Albert B. Hills, Jr.	ALP	
2023	Prince K. Koinah	IND	

== Election results ==
2005 Bong County's 1st House District Election
Candidate	Party	Votes	%
Corpu G. Barclay	Unity Party	4,215	27.59
Emmanuel A. Lomax	National Patriotic Party	2,874	18.81
Joseph Fonuham Gbolor	Coalition for the Transformation of Liberia	2,568	16.81
Wayfa Florence Ciapha	Alliance for Peace and Democracy	1,451	9.50
George Kponwonwoe Johnson	Congress for Democratic Change	1,322	8.65
Momo B. H. Tehmeh	Independent	1,120	7.33
Moses Boye Kaine	Labor Party of Liberia	930	6.09
Etta N. Pope	Liberty Party	799	5.23
Total		15,279	100.00
Valid votes		15,279	94.18
Invalid/blank votes		944	5.82
Total votes		16,223	100.00

2011 Bong County's 1st House District Election
Candidate	Party	Votes	%
Tokpah J. Mulbah	Congress for Democratic Change	3,279	18.91
Jerome George Korkoya	Unity Party	2,321	13.39
David B. J. Wymah	Union of Liberian Democrats	2,286	13.18
Wamah Kuteh	Liberia Transformation Party	2,220	12.80
Alfredson Wouwai Taikerweyah	Independent	1,144	6.60
Chris Whama Korkollie	Liberty Party	1,113	6.42
Jackson Saye Gweh	Original Congress Party of Liberia	1,005	5.80
Adolphus B. G. Zackpah Sr.	Independent	963	5.55
Richard K. V. Mulbah	Liberia Destiny Party	884	5.10
E. Richard Dillon	Movement for Progressive Change	621	3.58
Moses Kollie Tatee	Independent	545	3.14
J. Alexander Zogbaye Sr.	Alliance for Peace and Democracy	443	2.56
Eric D. K. Nyanzeh	Independent	284	1.64
Anthony G. W. Paye	Progressive Democratic Party	230	1.33
Total		17,338	100.00
Valid votes		17,338	93.53
Invalid/blank votes		1,199	6.47
Total votes		18,537	100.00

2017 Bong County's 1st House District Election
Candidate	Party	Votes	%
Albert B. Hills Jr.	All Liberian Party	7,523	31.92
Emmanuel R. Dillon	Independent	5,264	22.33
Wamah Kuteh	Liberty Party	3,804	16.14
Tokpah J. Mulbah (Incumbent)	People's Unification Party	2,621	11.12
Moses K. Tatee	Liberia Transformation Party	780	3.31
Theophilus Nelson Mulbah	Vision for Liberia Transformation	576	2.44
John Alvin Blackie	Liberian People's Party	565	2.40
John K. Gongbo	Liberia National Union	558	2.37
Emmanuel Vaicone Kwenah	Coalition for Liberia's Progress	477	2.02
James D. Jackson	United People's Party	310	1.32
Payne Hans Black-Peh	True Whig Party	294	1.25
Conteh K. Yallah	Movement for Progressive Change	285	1.21
Obediah Thompson Kpoe	Movement for Democracy and Reconstruction	221	0.94
Patrick Clarke Jergbou	Alternative National Congress	213	0.90
Mary Quita Johnson	Coalition for Democratic Change	79	0.34
Total		23,570	100.00
Valid votes		23,570	94.77
Invalid/blank votes		1,302	5.23
Total votes		24,872	100.00
