= Commonwealth District, Montserrado County =

District of Liberia

Commonwealth
- District
- Location within Liberia
- Country: Liberia
- County: Montserrado

Population (2008)
  - Total: 11,876

Commonwealth is a district in Montserrado County in Liberia. The population was 11,876 in 2008, according to Population and Housing Census.
