= Quardu Gboni District =

Coordinates: 8.345°N 9.611°W

Quardu Gboni District (also Quardu Bondi, Quardu Gbondi) is an administrative district of Lofa County in Liberia. In 2008, it had a population of 18,785.

An 80-year long boundary dispute between Quardu Gboni and Voinjama districts, over land near the villages of Sarmodu and Selega, resulted in a moratorium being placed for the land in late 2018. The dispute was eventually settled in 2020, with the border between the districts being the Daziza Creek.

The district is predominantly Mandingo (99%) who are all Maliki Muslims. According to LISGIS 2008 report, the region is about a little over 33,000 hectares (82,000 acres) of land with over thirty human settlements. Barkedu is the largest town in the district.

== Notable residents ==
- Edward Kesselly, politician who founded the Unity Party
- G. V. Kromah, resistance leader during the First Liberian Civil War
