= Sanquin District 3 =

District in Sinoe County, Liberia

Coordinates: 5.282°N 9.322°W

Sanquin District 3 is one of 16 districts of Sinoe County, Liberia. As of 2008, the population was 3,174.
