= Sanquin District 1 =

District of Sinoe County, Liberia

Coordinates: 5.511°N 9.211°W

Sanquin District 1 is one of 16 districts of Sinoe County, Liberia. As of 2008, the population was 2,118.
