= Grand Kru County =

County of Liberia

- County
- Flag

- Location in Liberia
- Coordinates: 4°55′N 8°15′W
- Country: Liberia
- Capital: Barclayville
- Districts: 4
- Established: 1984

Government
  - Superintendent: Antoinette W. Nimely

Area
  - Total: 3,895 km^{2} (1,504 sq mi)

Population (2022)
  - Total: 109,342
  - Density: 28.07/km^{2} (72.71/sq mi)
- Time zone: UTC+0 (GMT)
- HDI (2018): 0.418 low · 8th of 15

Grand Kru County is a county in the southeastern portion of Liberia. One of 15 counties that comprise the first-level of administrative division in the nation, it has eighteen districts. Organized in 1984, its capital is Barclayville. The area of the county measures 1,504 square miles (3,900 km^{2}). As of the 2022 census, it had a population of 109,342, making it the third-least populous county in Liberia.

As of 2025, Grand Kru's County Superintendent is Antoinette W. Nimely. The county is bordered by River Gee County to the northeast, Sinoe County to the northwest, and Maryland County to the southeast. The southern part of Grand Kru borders the Atlantic Ocean.

== History ==
Grand Kru was created in 1984 by the merger of the territories of Sasstown and Kru Coast. Kru Coast territory had previously been part of Maryland County, and Sasstown territory had previously been part of Sinoe county. As of the 1984 Census, the county had a population of 62,791. A UN Mission in Liberia report issued in April 2005 estimated that the population was 71,000.

== Demographics ==
The primary language is Kru, which is spoken in several significantly different dialects around the county. Some areas identify their language as Buah and Kplio. Liberian English is the language of school instruction.

== Districts ==
The county is divided into nineteen districts. Coordinates and population figures from the 2008 and 2022 censuses are given in the table below.

District	Coordinates	Population in 2008	Population in 2022
Barclayville	4.73°N 8.18°W	10904	12619
Bleebo	4.75°N 7.96°W	1809	2820
Bolloh	4.96°N 8.40°W	1891	1755
Buah	4.84°N 8.17°W	649	2903
Dorbor	4.99°N 8.28°W	1935	8167
Dweh	5.07°N 8.07°W	935	3966
Felo-Jekwi	4.73°N 8.38°W	2194	3903
Fenetoe	4.90°N 8.37°W	1742	2236
Forpoh	5.11°N 8.24°W	1088	4970
Garraway	4.56°N 7.91°W	9726	17000
Gee	4.94°N 8.16°W	2522	5328
Grand Cess Wedabo	4.62°N 8.09°W	10471	18011
Upper Jloh	4.82°N 8.47°W	1917	3746
Lower Jloh	4.88°N 8.56°W	1212	3639
Kpi	5.01°N 8.14°W	1603	1367
Nrokwia-Wesldow	4.83°N 8.33°W	1878	2873
Penicess		-	2828
Trenbo	4.70°N 7.87°W	3912	9182
Wlogba	5.08°N 8.18°W	688	2029

== Economy ==
The area has few roads so it has had limited business or residential development. Because of the long period of war since the late 20th century, few investments were made in infrastructure. In June 2005 the UN Integrated Regional Information Network reported that the roads in Grand Kru had decayed and become overgrown by dense bush, rendering them impassable except on foot. The bridge across the Nu River near Barclayville was constructed after the warfare to link the major trade route from Pleebo to Barclayville.

The residents have a subsistence farming economy, based on slash-and-burn techniques of clearing the bush. The most important crops are upland rice, cassava, palm nuts, and along the coast, fishing. Feed maize is grown at higher elevations farther inland. Sugar cane and several varieties of bananas grow in the wetland areas. Cash crops include coffee, cocoa, and kola. Locally grown bamboo and piassava palm are widely used for construction, mats and baskets. Many tropical fruits, domestic and wild, grow in the region including oranges, limes, mangos, soursop, breadfruit, and coconut.

The people keep poultry, cattle, sheep, and goat to supplement their diets and to use for their products; the animals are found in and around most villages. Most animals are of pygmy variety, as larger varieties die quickly due to the heat and humidity.

Before the civil war, the region's extensive rainforests contained a wide variety of wildlife including wild pigs, bongo, dik-dik, pangolin, civet, pygmy hippo, African buffalo, and colobus monkey, all of which are hunted for food and hides. Also found are snakes and very small populations of forest elephants and leopards. The warfare disrupted their habitats; in addition, many animals were killed in the course of the war and their populations have fallen.

== Notable people ==
- Nyudueh Morkonmana, speaker of the House of Representatives.
- George Weah, President of the Republic of Liberia
