= Garr Bain District =

Coordinates: 7.200°N 8.902°W

Garr Bain District is one of 17 districts of Nimba County, Liberia. As of 2008, the population was 61,225. it is notable for the traditional ceremony of waving handkerchiefs on the first full moon of the year, in order to appease the gods of harvest.
