= Sapo National Park =

National park in Liberia

- IUCN category II (national park)
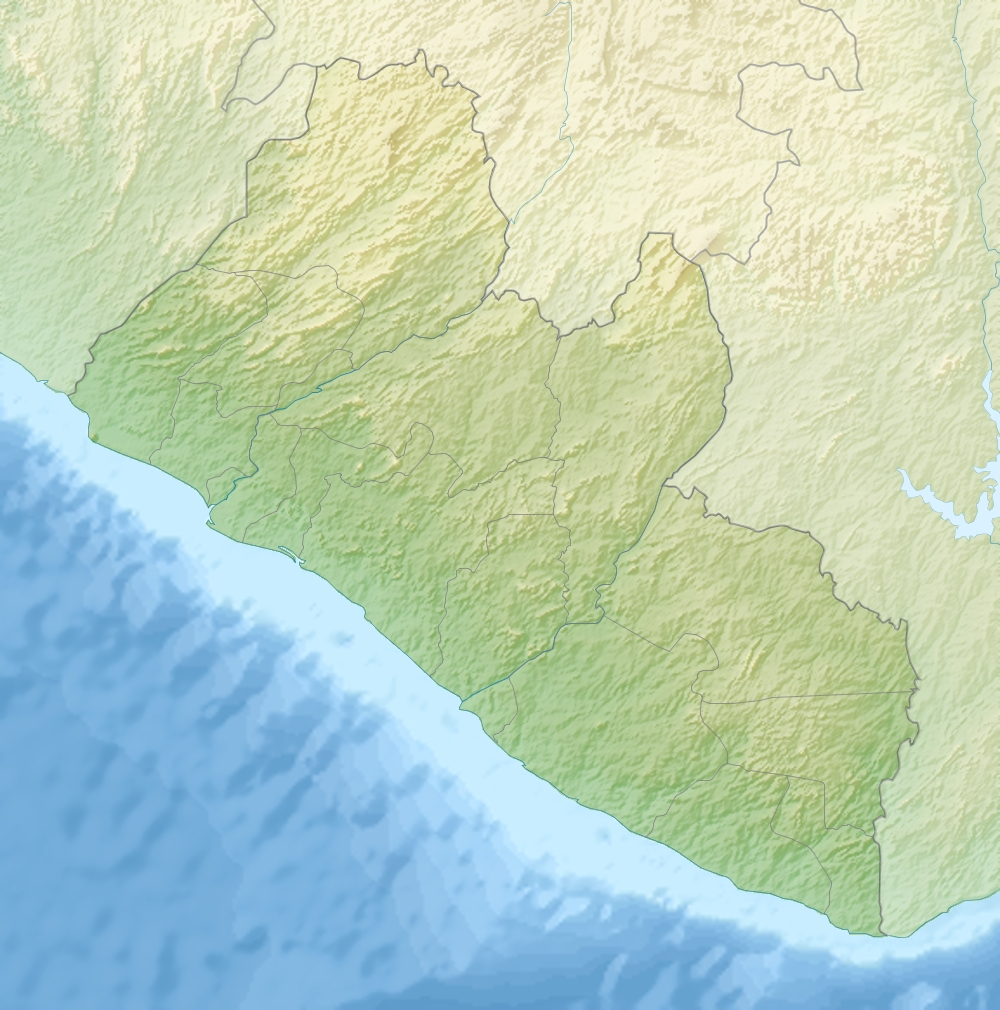
- Location within Liberia
- Location: Sinoe County, Liberia
- Nearest city: Greenville
- Coordinates: 5°24′40.01″N 8°24′52.65″W
- Area: 1,804 km^{2} (697 sq mi)
- Established: 1983
- Governing body: Forestry Development Authority

Sapo National Park is a national park in Sinoe County, Liberia. It is the country's largest protected area of rainforest, was the first national park established in the country, and contains the second-largest area of primary tropical rainforest in West Africa after Taï National Park in neighbouring Côte d'Ivoire. Agriculture, construction, fishing, hunting, human settlement, and logging are prohibited in the park.

Sapo National Park is located in the Upper Guinean forest ecosystem, a biodiversity hotspot that has "the highest mammal species diversity of any region in the world", according to Conservation International, and in the Western Guinean lowland forests ecoregion, according to the World Wide Fund for Nature's ecoregions classification scheme.

== History ==
=== Designation and early history ===
In 1976, the Liberian Forestry Development Authority was created to manage and preserve the country's forest resources. A year later, in 1977, the Division of Wildlife and National Parks was formed under the leadership of Alexander Peal, who served as its head until 1990. By 1982, seven protected areas has been proposed in Liberia, including three national parks. Of these, only Sapo National Park — named after the local Sapo (or Sao) tribe — was formally designated, in 1983, by the People's Redemption Council. At the time, and for twenty years, it covered an area of 1,308 km^{2} (505 sq mi) east of the Sinoe River and south of the Putu Mountains. The park's original boundaries were set and its management plan drafted by the Division of Wildlife and National Parks, in cooperation with the World Wildlife Fund, the World Conservation Union, and the Peace Corps.

Throughout its history, Sapo National Park has been threatened by illegal farming, hunting, logging, and mining, "all exacerbated by the country's grinding poverty" and social and political instability. However, in the early 1990s, the World Conservation Monitoring Centre reported that "[rural development projects around the park and general acceptance of its existence have helped to minimise potential conflicts." Until the 1990s, poaching was limited due to various initiatives, funded by the United States Agency for International Development, that made local villagers stakeholders to the park's preservation.

=== Civil war in Liberia ===
During the First Liberian Civil War, Sapo National Park fell into the hands of rebel forces, and much of the park's infrastructure and equipment was damaged or destroyed, including a wildlife rehabilitation and orphanage facility constructed in 1989 and supported by Friends of Animals. Of 33 park employees, at least three were killed and seven became refugees. The extent of illegal resource extraction from inside the park during the period of rebel control is disputed. John Terborgh, a professor of environmental science and biology at Duke University, writes that "[l]ogging was rampant during the war". However, Peal reported that logging was limited, and that farming and hunting pressures were minimised, by population displacement — including the exodus of people out of over two dozen villages surrounding the park — and the prevailing climate of insecurity, to the extent that species populations actually increased during the war years. William Powers, a Catholic Relief Services official posted to Liberia from 1999 to 2001, noted that the park was a war-time haven for small groups of people, who scavenged for food and hunted bushmeat to survive. Logging and poaching became more common after the war's end in 1996.

In 2002, allegations surfaced that President Charles Taylor had sold concessions worth several millions of United States dollars to a Hong Kong-based timber company — the Oriental Timber Company — to conduct logging within the boundaries of the park. The funds were reportedly pocketed by Taylor or used to secure the loyalty of various senior commanders, to arm loyalist forces embroiled in the Second Liberian Civil War (1999–2003), and to acquire mercenary fighters from South Africa. Liberia's Minister of Information, Reginald Goodridge, denied the allegations, noting that no evidence of logging was found during a National Geographic Society team's two-week visit to the park.

=== Post-war developments ===
Fauna and Flora International and the World Wildlife Fund (WWF) worked with Liberia's Forestry Development Authority and the Society for the Conservation of Nature of Liberia (SCNL) to prepare a two-year initiative to restart management of the park. Mainly funded by the Darwin Initiative of the United Kingdom's Department for Environment, Food and Rural Affairs and the World Wildlife fund from 2000 to 2002, the objectives of the initiative were to re-establish the park's management, build support for the park among the local community, and to build Liberia's capacity in conservation management and planning. The SCNL also received a grant from the Whitley Foundation to begin a programme to monitor the park's large mammals. Landscape initiatives in southeast Liberia associated with the park have also involved Conservation International Liberia.

There has been very slow progress in the establishment of protected areas in Liberia. Sapo National Park, proclaimed in 1983, was the country's first protected area. The approval of the Sapo National Park Act (An Act for the extension of the Sapo National Park) on October 10, 2003, expanded the size of the park to 1,804 km^{2} (697 sq mi), constituting an increase of more than 37%. The act recognised the park as being "at the core of an immense forests block of the Upper Guinea Forest Ecosystem that is important to the conservation of the biodiversity of Liberia and of West Africa as a whole". The 135 km^{2} (33,359 acres) East Nimba Nature Reserve (ENNR), on the border with Guinea and Côte d'Ivoire, was created at the same time to become Liberia's second protected area.

The peace that followed the conclusion of the Second Liberian Civil War gave rise to new threats to the park. Groups of fighters and civilians moved into the park during the final months of the conflict — some to escape the conflict and others to harvest timber or prospect for gold. The influx of people into the park continued after the war's end, eventually growing into a full-scale gold rush. Accompanying or following the prospectors were hunters, many of them former combatants, who poached the park's animals to sell as meat to the settlers. By March 2005, an estimated 5,000 people lived in the park, according to the United Nations Mission in Liberia. Although efforts were undertaken to remove the illegal squatters, the park was not completely emptied until late August-early September 2005, and then only through the participation of conservationists, the Liberian government, and United Nations peacekeeping forces.

Due to its remote location and the near-complete absence of tangible amenities, such as visitor housing or recreational facilities, there are few visitors to Sapo National Park. Entry into the park is prohibited without approval from the Forestry Development Authority. No roads lead into the park, so it can be reached only on foot. The park also has no trails.

== Geography and climate ==
Located in Sinoe County in southwestern Liberia, Sapo National Park covers an area of 1,804 km^{2} (697 sq mi). The park is bounded to the north by the Putu Mountains and to the west by the Sinoe River. The park's quite homogeneous, flat and marshy topography supports a large area of uninhabited forest. Its southeastern area has lower elevations of approximately 100 m (328 ft) and gentle hills, while there are elevations of about 400 m (1,312 ft) and steep ridges in the north. There are many small streams and rivers between these ridges. Sinoe River is the largest river in the park. Mount Putu's 640 m (2,100 ft) summit is the highest elevation in the park.

The park has a tropical climate, with temperatures ranging between 22 and 28 °C (72–82 °F). The forest's average relative humidity is 91%. Annual precipitation at Basintown, 4 km (2 mi) south of the park's headquarters, averaged 2,596 mm (100 in) in the 1980s. The park's dry season occurs from November to April and the wet season lasts from May to October. January and December are the driest months in the park, and May and August are the wettest months. There is a mid-dry period of decreased rainfall in July, which occasionally extends into August. During the dry season, many of the smaller streams dry up and their sandy and rocky stream beds are exposed. The dry season also causes the larger rivers shrink in size, exposing waterfalls and sandbars. In the rainy season, river levels can rise by more than 4 m (13 ft) in one night, inundating forests near the rivers.

== Biodiversity ==
From the airplane I stare down upon this forest for the first time. ... Below me is a block of peacock, kelly, and olive green stretching out to the horizon. I search for breaks in the canopy but find none. As far as my eyes can see, the earth is solid rainforest.

— William Powers, Blue Clay People (2005)

=== Flora ===
Liberia has the largest remaining part of the Upper Guinean forest ecosystem, with an estimated 42% of the remaining forest. The rest of the Upper Guinean forest is located in Côte d'Ivoire (28% of the remaining forest), Ghana (16%), Guinea (8%), Sierra Leone (5%), and Togo (1%). Just an estimated 40-45% of Liberia's original forest cover remains, and less than 30% of its area is covered by natural forest. Its tracts of forest were once continuous, but are now fragmented into blocks that are isolated from each other as a result of logging, road-building, cultivation, and human settlements. Before the civil war, the Forestry Development Authority calculated that about 35% of Liberia's original forest was "undisturbed", 45% was "disturbed but productive", and 20% was "disturbed and unproductive". Sapo National Park's forest is one of the country's last remaining blocks of tropical lowland rain forest, and one of West Africa's least disturbed lowland rainforests. It is the second-largest area of primary tropical rainforest in West Africa after Taï National Park in Côte d'Ivoire.

The park has one of the richest amounts of floral species in the country, with many endemic species. A 1983 survey of the park determined it to be composed of 63% primary and mature secondary forest, 13% swamp forest, 13% seasonally inundated forest, and 11% young secondary forest. The forest is luxuriant, with trees that can grow to a height of 70 m (230 ft). The forest canopy's height ranges from 12–32 m (39–105 ft), with an average height of 25 m (82 ft). Plant species found in the park include the legumes Tetraberlinia tubmaniana and Gilbertiodendron splendidum, and the tree Brachystegia leonensis.

=== Fauna ===
Sapo National Park is a "regional centre of endemism" and biodiversity, at one time hosting around 125 mammal species and 590 types of bird, including a number of threatened species, such as the African golden cat, Gola malimbe, Liberian mongoose, white-breasted guineafowl, and white-necked rockfowl. The park is also home to the African civet, African fish eagle, grey parrot, giant forest hog, great blue turaco, speckle-throated otter, water chevrotain, three species of pangolin, seven species of monkey (including the endangered Diana monkey), crocodiles, leopards, bee-eaters, egrets, hornbills, kingfishers, rollers, and sunbirds. The park has been designated an Important Bird Area (IBA) by BirdLife International because it supports significant populations of many bird species.

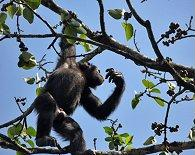
Western chimpanzee

==== Chimpanzees ====
Prior to the formal designation of Sapo National Park in 1983 there had been "no systematic study of chimpanzee populations in Liberia". Since then, various surveys have confirmed the existence of the western chimpanzee in Sapo National Park, located primarily in the park's center and western areas, with estimates of the population ranging from 500 to 1,640. The culture of the local Sapo people includes a reverence for the chimpanzee and, therefore, a taboo against their hunting.

==== Duikers ====
Seven species of duiker antelopes are found in Sapo National Park, including the vulnerable Jentink's duiker and zebra duiker. Bay duikers and Maxwell's duikers are reported to be locally abundant.

==== Pygmy hippopotamuses ====
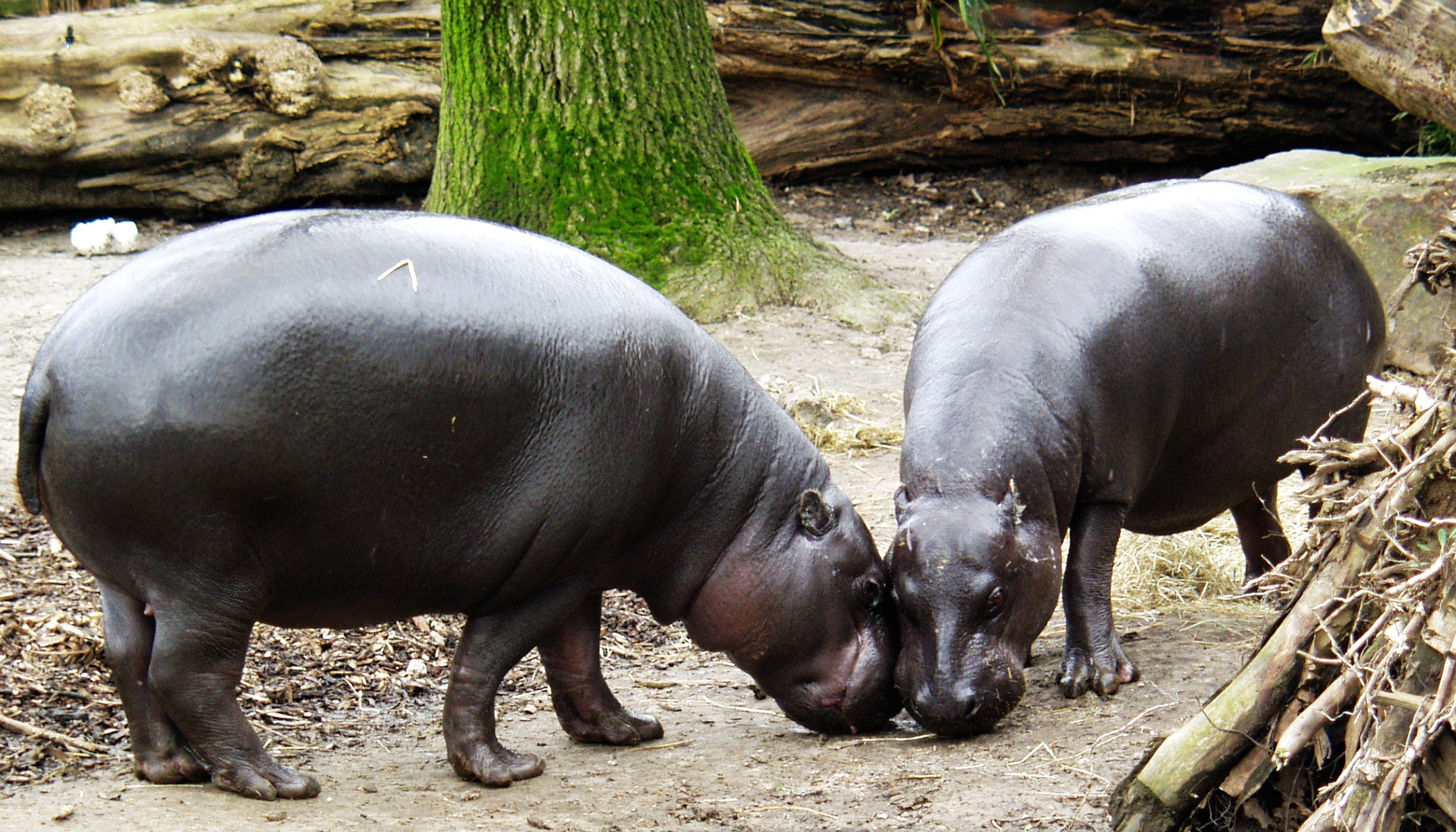
Sapo National Park contains the largest pygmy hippopotamus populations in Liberia.

Sapo National Park contains populations of the pygmy hippopotamus, an endangered species which has legal protection in Liberia under the Wildlife and National Park Act of 1988. Unique to West Africa, the wild population of pygmy hippopotamuses is thought to number less than 3,000 individuals. According to the World Conservation Union (IUCN), conservation efforts targeted at the species have "historically been most effective in the Sapo National Park ... where protection is good". According to an action plan published by the IUCN Species Survival Commission, Sapo National Park is "the only realistic choice" of a "of suitable conservation area" for the Pygmy Hippopotamus. In February 2008, automatic heat- and motion-sensing cameras set up in Sapo National Park captured the first photographs of the pygmy hippopotamus ever taken in Liberia. The photographs confirmed the continued presence of the species inside the boundaries of the park; previously, scientists did not know whether the pygmy hippopotamus population in the park had survived the civil wars and subsequent poaching and logging.

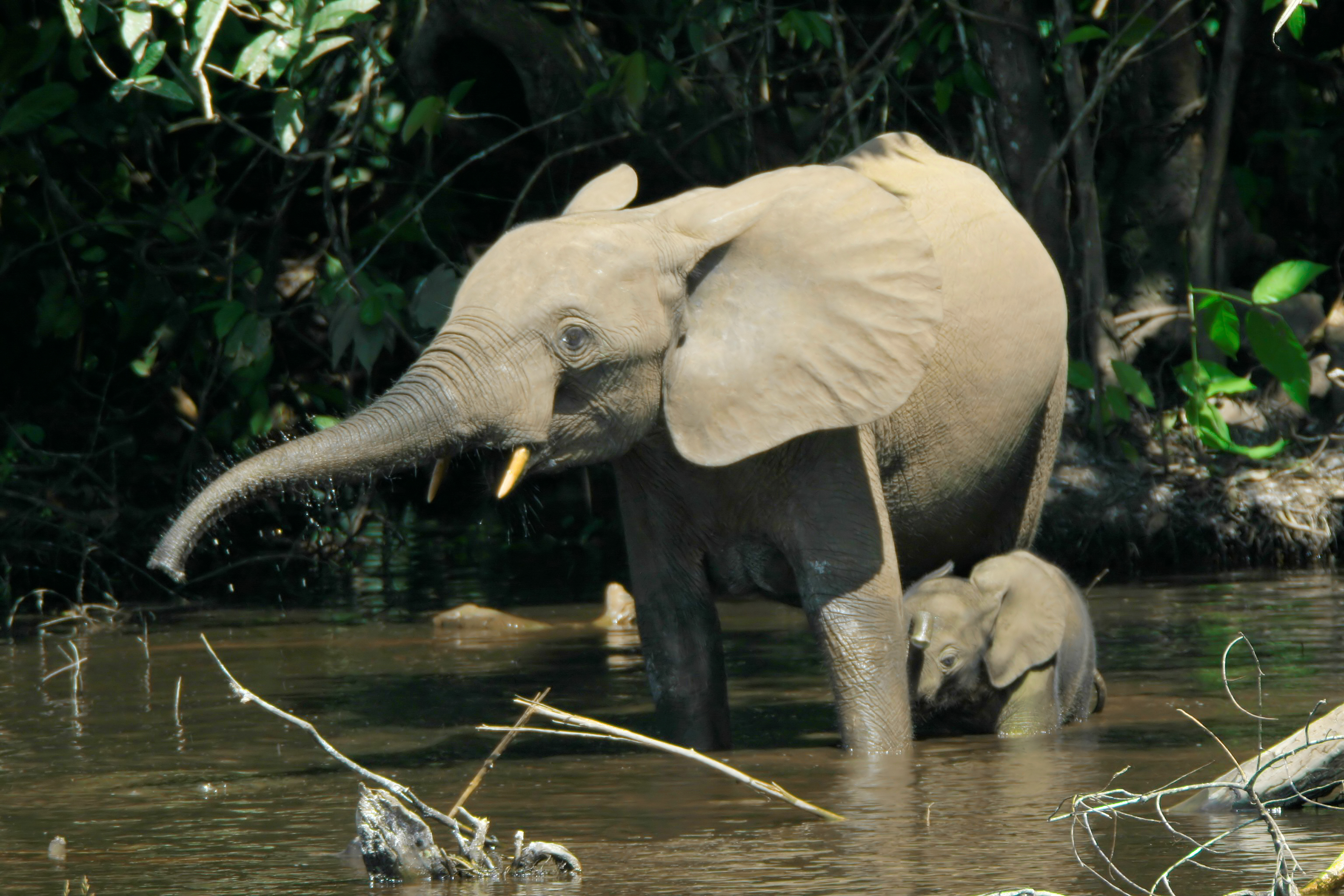
Sapo National Park hosted up to 500 African forest elephants in the early 1980s.

==== Forest elephants ====
The endangered African forest elephant is also present in Sapo National park, with population estimates ranging from "as many as 500" for the early 1980s to between 313 and 430 for the end of the decade; however, the IUCN considers the most recent surveys — both of which relied on dung counts — to be of low quality and reliability.

== See also ==
- List of national parks in Africa
- Wildlife of Liberia
