= River Gee County =

County of Liberia

- County
- Flag

- Location in Liberia
- Coordinates: 5°15′N 7°55′W
- Country: Liberia
- Capital: Fish Town
- Districts: 10
- Established: 2000

Government
  - Superintendent: Philip Q. Nyenuh

Area
  - Total: 5,113 km^{2} (1,974 sq mi)

Population (2022)
  - Total: 124,653
  - Density: 24.38/km^{2} (63.14/sq mi)
- Time zone: UTC+0 (GMT)
- HDI (2018): 0.410 low · 10th of 15

River Gee is a county in the southern portion of Liberia. One of 15 counties that constitute the first-level of administrative division in the nation, it has six districts. Fish Town serves as the capital with the area of the county measuring 1,974 square miles (5,110 km^{2}). As of the 2022 Census, it had a population of 124,653, making it one of the least populous counties in Liberia. It was created in 2000.

The tenth-largest area, it is bordered by Sinoe County to the west, Grand Gedeh County to the north, and Grand Kru and Maryland counties to the south. The eastern part of River Gee borders the nation of Ivory Coast along the Cavalla River. The current County Superintendent is Daniel Johnson.

== Geography ==
River Gee split from Grand Gedeh County in May 2000 after receiving approval from Liberia's House of Representatives in May 1997 and Senate approval in March 2000. To the east of the county is the Cavalla River that forms Liberia's border with the Ivory Coast. River Gee's capital is Fish Town. The county was created by splitting the Grand Gedeh County.

The River Gee watershed has lower tropical forests with mid-size hills and various valleys. These forests receive a very high rainfall ranging from 3,000 mm (120 in) to 4,100 mm (160 in) per year in two distinct seasons. It has evergreen forests. While in the uplands it is conducive for rice cultivation, the low-lying areas are conducive for yam, cocoa, plantains, potatoes, vegetables, rubber, coffee, and sugarcane. The county accommodates the Glaro Reforestation Project with a designated National Plantation area of 1,008.89 ha (2,493.0 acres). It also shares the National proposed reserve of Grebo Forest (97,136 ha (240,030 acres)) with Grand Gedeh County.

== Demographics ==
As of 2008, the county had a population of 66,789: 34,863 male and 31,926 female. The sex ratio was 109.2 compared to 96.2 in the 1994 census. The number of households during 2008 was 9,822, averaging 6.5 people per house. The county represented 1.90% of the total population, remaining as in 1994, as seen on the census. With an area of 1,974 sq mi (5112.637km²) and the density per square mile was 34, it rose when compared to 20 people per square mile in 1984. Liberia experienced civil war(s) during several periods causing 7,862 people to be displaced as of 2008. The number of people residing in urban areas was 13,370. Of those, 6,698 were males and 6,672 were females. The total number of people in rural areas was 89,021, with 48,069 males and 40,952 females. The total fraction of people residing in urban areas was 20.02%, while the remaining 79.98% were living in rural areas. The number of people who immigrated and resettled their homes in the county was 7,320 in 2008’s count while there were also 258 people who had not resettled.

== Economy ==
As of 2011, the area of rice plantation was 7,190 ha (17,800 acres), 3.010% of the total area of rice produced in the country. The total production stood at 8040 metric tonnes. According to 2011 data, the number of Cassava plantations was 3790, which was 3.1% of the total area of Cassava planted in the country. The total production stood at 1550 metric tonnes. The number of Cocoa plantations was 1550, which was 4% of the total area of Cassava planted in the country. The number of rubber plantations was 660, which was 1.1% of the total area of Cassava planted in the country. The number of Coffee plantations was 140, which was 0.6 percent of the total area of Cassava planted in the country. As of 2008, the county had 1,744 paid employees, 19,331 self-employed people, 4,381 family workers, 566 people looking for work, 1,300 not working people, 2,154 people working in households, 19,290 students, 90 retired people, 252 incapacitated people, 334 part-time workers and 4,053 others, making the total working population of 53,495.

== Administrative divisions ==
The districts of River Gee County include (2008 population):

- Chedepo District (10,518)
- Gbeapo District (10,934)
- Glaro District (4,992)
- Karforh District (5,956)
- Nanee District (6,002)
- Nyenawliken District (5,159)
- Nyenebo District (5,703)
- Potupo District (7,337)
- Sarbo District (5,320)
- Tuobo District (4,868)
