= Yarpea Mahn District =

Coordinates: 7.224°N 8.705°W

Yarpea Mahn District is one of 17 districts of Nimba County, Liberia. As of 2008, the population was 21,647.
