= Nimba County =

County of Liberia

- County
- Flag
- Nickname: The Heroic Land (The Home of Conqueror)
- Motto: YA Go NIMBA YAA SIE
- Location in Liberia
- Coordinates: 6°45′N 8°45′W
- Country: Liberia
- Capital: Sanniquellie
- Largest city: Ganta
- Districts: 9
- Established: 1964

Government
  - Superintendent: Mah Meapeh Kou Gono
  - Senators: Nya D. Twayen, Jr. and Samuel G. Kogar

Area
  - Total: 11,551 km^{2} (4,460 sq mi)

Population (2022)
  - Total: 621,841
  - Density: 53.834/km^{2} (139.43/sq mi)
- Time zone: UTC+0 (GMT)
- HDI (2018): 0.462 low · 3rd of 15

Nimba County is a county in northeastern Liberia that shares borders with the Republic of Côte d'Ivoire in the East and the Republic of Guinea in the Northwest. Its capital city is Sanniquellie and its most populous city is Ganta. With the county's area measuring 11,551 square miles (29,920 km^{2}), Nimba is the largest of Liberia's 15 counties. The county has six statutory districts. As of the 2022 Census, it had a population of 621,841, making it the second most populous county in Liberia.

Named after Mount Nimba (Neinbaa Tohn in the Mahn (or Mano) language), which demarcates part of the Guinea-Côte d'Ivoire border, Nimba is also bordered by Bong and Grand Bassa counties to the west, Rivercess County to the southwest, and Grand Gedeh County to the southeast. The northern and northeastern parts of Nimba border the nation of Republic of Guinea, while the northeast lies along the border of Côte d'Ivoire.

== Government ==
Nimba County is one of fifteen counties of Liberia. During the nearly three-decade administration of William V.S. Tubman (1944–1971), the region now called Nimba County was one of three of Liberia's provinces: Western Province, Eastern Province, and Central Province. In the sixties, Tubman reorganized these provinces into counties. Central Province became what is known as Nimba County.

Before the First Liberian Civil War broke out in 1989, the county had a population of over 310,000 people. The top executive in the counties is a County Superintendent, appointed by the president of the county. The previous County Superintendent, D. Dorr Cooper, who is the chief administrative officer, was appointed by President Ellen Johnson Sirleaf in 2017. He was re-appointed in 2018 by President George Weah after a change in administrations. The current County Superintendent is Kou Meapeh Gono, appointed by President Joseph Boakai in 2024.

== National legislatures ==
The County is represented by two senators and by nine representatives in the bicameral Legislative Branch of Government. The two senators currently serving the citizens of Nimba County are Nya D. Twayen, Jr. and Samuel G. Kogar

=== Administrative districts ===
According to the 2008 census, the 17 Administrative Districts in Nimba County have the following populations:

- Boe & Quilla District (18,262)
- Buu-Yao District (40,007)
- Doe District (35,918)
- Garr Bain District (61,225)
- Gbehlay-Geh District (32,176)
- Gbi & Doru District (8,131)
- Gbor District (10,875)
- Kparblee District (11,424)
- Leewehpea-Mahn District (24,747)
- Meinpea-Mahn District (24,157)
- Sanniquellie-Mah District (25,370)
- Twah River District (37,479)
- Garr Bain District (37,479)
- Wee-Gbehy-Mahn District (32,934)
- Yarmein District (22,718)
- Yarpea Mahn District (21,647)
- Yarwein Mehnsonnoh District (25,584)
- Zoe-Gbao District (29,372)

=== Electoral Districts ===
Since the 2008 census, there 9 electoral districts in Nimba County:

- Nimba District 1 Garr Bain District
- Nimba District 2 Garr Bain District, Sanniquellie-Mahn District and Yarpea Mahn District
- Nimba District 3 Garr Bain District, Gbehley-Geh District and Yarmein District
- Nimba District 4 Gbor District and Twah River District
- Nimba District 5 Buu-Yao District
- Nimba District 6 Boe & Quilla District, Gblor District, Doe District and Kparblee District
- Nimba District 7 Zoe-Gbao District and Wee-Gbehy-Mahn District
- Nimba District 8 Leewehpea-Mahn District and Meinpea-Mahn District
- Nimba District 9 Gbi & Doru District, Doe District and Yarwein-Mehnsonoh District

== Iron ore ==
During the late 1950s, iron ore was found in "the Iron Mountain" Mount Nimba. In a joint venture among the Liberian Government, US Bethlehem Steel, and the Swedish mining company Gränges, a huge project was set up: LAMCO (Liberian American Company). The project contributed to economic and social development in Liberia for 30 years. It built the necessary infrastructure and operated mining, transporting ore by rail to the port of Buchanan, from where it was exported to other markets.

Corruption was minimal and political stability improved. During this period, Liberia was classified among the most progressive countries in Africa.

In 1980 civil war erupted between tribal factions. Nimba county was devastated by the civil war that followed. The iron ore had been degrading in quality, and world prices had plunged in this period. The combination led to a dismantling of the LAMCO project. Since the end of the Civil War (which lasted for more than a decade), there are discussions about renewing mining at Nimba is finally getting better. ArcelorMittal, a European-Indian steel business, is committed to reopening the iron mine at Nimba Mountain, outside the former company town of Yekepa. Hospitals and schools built and financed by LAMCO are now being run by ArcelorMittal. The houses which were built by LAMCO have partly been rehabilitated by ArcelorMittal, though many had been overtaken by rainforest development.

BHP Billiton has engaged in an extraction agreement with the Government of Liberia to mine ore in Nimba. As such, they are active promoters of education, scholarship and, for the most part, human resources.

== Demographics ==
The main ethnic groups in Nimba County are the Dan, also known as Gio and the Mano. The Dan, commonly known as the Gio, live closer to the Côte d'Ivoire border. In that French-speaking country, they are known as the Yacouba. The Mano live closer to the Guinea border.

There are also indigenous minority groups, such as Krahn, Gbi, and Doru. Small Kpelle and Bassa settlements are located near the borders of Bong County and Grand Bassa County, respectively. These are the historical indigenous peoples of Nimba County who have settled in towns and villages.

Various ethnic groups from other parts of Liberia, such as the Mandingo people, have also settled here. They are indigenous people of Lofa County, Guinea, and the Côte d'Ivoire. Other tribal peoples include the Lorma from Lofa. Since the early 20th century, people from all parts of West Africa have settled in Nimba.

The ethnic Dan (Gio) owns and lives in these areas: Gbehlay-Geh Statutory District, Zoe-Geh Statutory District, and Tappita Statutory District. The main towns are Karnplay City, Bahn City, Tappitta City, Baylehglay, Buutuo, Garplay, Toweh Town, Graie, Gbloulay, et cetera.

The Man (or Mano) ethnic groups own and live in the Sanniquellie Mah Statutory District, the Saclepea Mah Statutory District, and the Yahwin-Mehnsonnoh Statutory District. The main towns are Sanniquellie City, Ganta City, Saclepea City, Flumpa, Zekepa, Kanwin, Yekepa, and others.

The ethnic Krahn live along the Ivory Coast border in Kpeahbleee District. The main towns are Zoudru, Behwoaloa, Yourpea Old Town, Yourpea New Town, et cetera. The other ethnic indigenous groups, the Gbi and Doru, live along the border of Grand Bassa and Rivercess counties. Their main towns are Glann Town, Camp One, Kidka's Town, and Torkpor's Town.

The Gio and the Mano ethnic group together are referred to as the Dan and are closely related tribes.

The Dan people also live in Côte d'Ivoire and Guinea. The Dan language is related to the Mande group of African languages.

Ganta has become the second-largest city in the country. Its population has grown as has its business class.

== Healthcare ==
Access to quality healthcare in Nimba is lacking for many residents. As of 2008, the hospital in Yekepa built by LAMCO, is currently being run by ArcelorMittal. In Sanniquellie, the County Referral Hospital is the George Way Harley Hospital. It is solely sponsored by the Ministry of Health, Nimba County. The county health officer is Dr. Collins S. Bowah, and the medical director of the County Referral Hospital is Dr. Lavela B. Kortimai, Jr. at Ganta.

The Methodist Church runs a private hospital. E and J Hospital opened in 2016 in Ganta, Nimba County. In Saclepea, the Government of Liberia and Africare jointly operate Saclepea Comprehensive Health Center. There are 74 functional health facilities in Nimba County, of which there is one regional referral: Jackson F. Doe Hospital.

== See also ==
- Nimba National Forest
- Gio National Forest
- Ganta
- Education
