= Sanquin District 2 =

District of Sinoe County, Liberia

Coordinates: 5.221°N 9.168°W

Sanquin District 2 is one of 16 districts of Sinoe County, Liberia. As of 2008, the population was 3,405.
