= Doedain District =

District of Liberia

Coordinates: 6.281°N 9.234°W

Doedain District is one of 8 districts of Rivercess County, Liberia. As of 2008, the population was 13,041.
