= Yarwein Mehnsonnoh District =

Coordinates: 6.621°N 9.054°W

Yarwein Mehnsonnoh (Yarwein-Mehnsohnneh) District is one of six districts located in Nimba County, Liberia. As of 2008, the population was 25,584. Famous people include Joseph Bartuah, a former journalist for The News.
