= Gbi & Doru District =

Coordinates: 6°10′00″N 8°55′00″W

Gbi & Doru District is one of 17 districts of Nimba County, Liberia. As of 2008, the population was 8,131.
