= Jaedae District =

District in Sinoe County, Liberia

Coordinates: 5.107°N 8.504°W

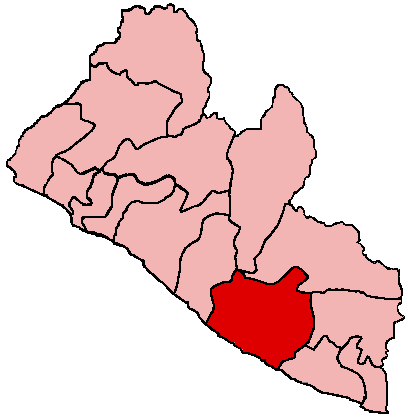
Map of Liberia showing Sinoe County

Jaedae District is one of 16 districts located in Sinoe County, Liberia. As of 2008, it had a population of 3,617.
