= Yarmein District =

Coordinates: 7.569°N 8.615°W

Yarmein (Yahmein) District is one of 17 districts of Nimba County, Liberia. As of 2008, the population was 22,718.
