= St. John River District =

District located in Grand Bassa County, Liberia

Coordinates: 6°34′59″N 9°35′24″W

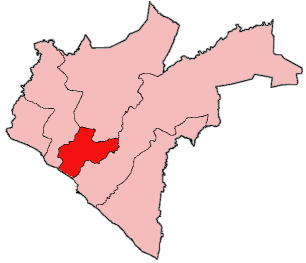
Location of St. John River District in Grand Bassa County

St. John River District is one of six districts located in Grand Bassa County, Liberia. The name derives from the Saint John River.

== Communities ==
- Edina
