= Nanee District =

Coordinates: 5.153°N 8.157°W

Nanee District is one of 10 districts of River Gee County, Liberia. As of 2008, the population was 6,002.
