= Kparblee District =

Coordinates: 6.653°N 8.506°W

- Administrative district
- Nimba county, Liberia
- Country: Liberia
- County: Nimba
- District: Tappita
- Established: 2003

Government
  - Commissioner: Hon. Emmanuel N. Kar

Population (2008)
  - Total: 11,424
- Time zone: UTC+0 (GMT)

Kparblee District is one of 17 Administrative Districts of Nimba County, Liberia. In 2008, the population was 11,424. It is located in Tappita Statutory District and situated along the Cestos River which borders Liberia with the Republic of Côte d'Ivoire, commonly called the Ivory Coast.

== People and Government ==
The district is mainly composed of two ethnic groups, the majority being Krahn and the minority being Gio. The first Commissioner of the District since its declaration in 2003 was Hon. Alexander N. Tenty Sr. from Dewoblee, of the Zodru Chiefdom. He served from July 2004 – 2010. The current Commissioner is Hon. Alexander Tenty, Sr who took over from Hon. Emmanuel N. Kar is from Kparblee town after the 2011 election. The headquarters of Kparblee Administrative District is Youkorway Old Town which has a population of a little over two thousand people. The only security found in the District is the Immigration with their office in Behwalay. A magisterial court was established sometimes in 2014 and is seated in Yourpea New Town. Current, Behwalay is among those rural cities to enjoy city status.

== Towns ==
The District is composed of fifteen larger towns with seven smaller villages. Towns within Kparblee Administrative District are:

1. Youkorway
2. Beatuo
3. New Yourpea Town
4. Behwalay
5. Dubuzon
6. Kaylay
7. Dewoblee I
8. Dewoblee II
9. Kparblee Town
10. Zodru Town
11. Gueyea Gbayee-blee

Karwehblee

1. Bah-blee
2. Karn-blee
3. Gayeplay
4. Tuzon
5. Yeah-blee
6. Tiah-blee

== Religion and Culture ==
The first religious group to visit the District and become established is the Mid-Baptist. The missionaries were Teacher Walkins, Teacher Homes, and Teacher Crocmanaul along with Rev Sawi Kpou in the Town of Kparblee during the early 1950s. Due to the missionaries' visit and decision to establish a church in the Chiefdom at the time, all cultural and traditional practices were abolished by the citizens.

== Transportation ==
A road was first built in the District in 1975 by Sika and since then has not been rehabilitated. While the transporting of chiefs, messengers and security personnel was still going on in the District at the time it was a chiefdom, the whole idea was discouraged by a young graduate from the BWI called Jonathan V. Dayee from Kparblee Town in 1976.

== Educational institutions ==
Currently, the District has approximately nine schools. One of the oldest schools is the high school, Kweyeah Memorial Institute (KMI). The Samuel Kayon Doe in Youkorway Old Town is a Technical High School.

== Agriculture ==
Prior to the First Liberian Civil War (1989-1997), Kparblee District was one of Nimba County's strong hopes for agricultural products such as cocoa, coffee and plantains. In 2012 the district was granted US$100,000 from the government, intended for agricultural activities.

== Elections ==
Kparblee District now forms part of the Electoral District number six in Nimba County after the demarcation exercise conducted by the National Elections Commission (NEC) in 2011. According to the results of the 2011 Voter's Registration exercise, Kparble District registered about 5,741 voters. Other communities which make up the district along with Kparblee are the Boe and Quilla Administrative District, and the Gblor and Gbear Chiefdom. Kparblee shares boundaries with these mentioned communities. Due to the ongoing civil crises in La Cote Ivoire, Kparblee has received a total of six thousand Ivorian refugees.

The citizens of Kpablee Administrative District residing in Monrovia and its environs have once again gathered to move the district forward. According to the Chairman of the Kparblee District Development Association (KPADDA), the organization will be conducting its first general elections with a completed constitution. The organization has set up an Electoral Commission and those on the commission are as follows:

- Hon. Moses B. Zayee Sr. Chairman
- Hon. Ruth J. Barshell Co-Chairman
- Mr. Chris Nyonton Nezzola Secretary
- Hon. Jackson Paye Commissioner
- Hon. Marcus Sawi Kpou Technical Consultant/ Commissioner.

Those on the constitution committee are:

- Hon Steve W. Weah Chairman
- Hon. Chris Nyonton Nezzola Co-Chairman
- Mr. Clarence B. Dennis Secretary
- Hon. Marcus Sawi Kpou Advisor
- Hon. N. Harrison Wondy Member
- Hon. Vera Barshell Member
- Hon. David Wounuah Member.

After the organization conducted its first general election and brought on board the following personalities as leaders: Hon. Peter S. Karngbaye, Sr-Chairman Hon Thompson Z. Gaylah-Co-Chairman Administrator Hon. Dale Rex George-Co-Chairman Operation Mr. Beh Othello Paye-General Secretary Mr. Floyd N. Foirjolo-Assistant Gen. Secretary Mad. Precious Gaye-Financial Secretary Mad. Mama Dennis-Treasurer Evan. William Youdee- Chaplain.
