= Kpayan District =

Coordinates: 5.124°N 8.795°W

Kpayan District is one of 16 districts of Sinoe County, Liberia. In 2008, the population was 10,043.
