= Bodae District =

District of Liberia

Coordinates: 5.110°N 8.332°W

Bodae District is one of 16 districts of Sinoe County, Liberia. As of 2008, the population was 3,030.
