= Sam Gbalor District =

District in Rivercess County, Liberia

Coordinates: 5.384°N 9.433°W

Sam Gbalor District is one of 8 districts of Rivercess County, Liberia. As of 2008, the population was 3,714.
