= Leewehpea-Mahn District =

Coordinates: 7.071°N 8.903°W

Leewehpea-Mahn District is one of 17 districts of Nimba County, Liberia. As of 2008, the population was 24,747.
