= Juarzon District =

Coordinates: 5°39′58″N 8°45′09″W

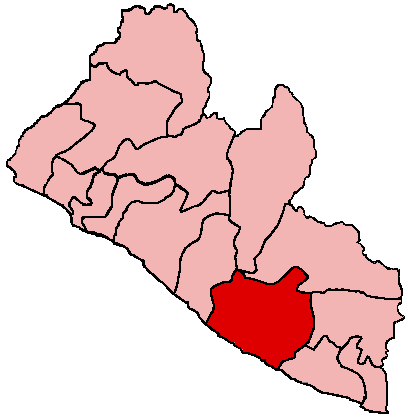
Map Districts

Juarzon District is one of 16 districts of Sinoe County, Liberia. As of 2008, the population was 6,151.
