= Gbehlageh District =

District in Nimba County, Liberia

Coordinates: 7°10′00″N 8°25′00″W

Gbehlay-Geh District is one of 17 districts located in Nimba County, Liberia. In 2008, the population was 32,176.
