= Nyenawliken District =

Coordinates: 5.157°N 7.982°W

Nyenawliken District (Nyanawriliken) is one of 10 districts of River Gee County, Liberia. As of 2008, the population was 5,159.

As of a 2022, the population was 14,102, of which 7,606 people identified as male, and 6,496 identified as female.
