= Buah District =

District of Liberia

Coordinates: 4°50′N 8°10′W

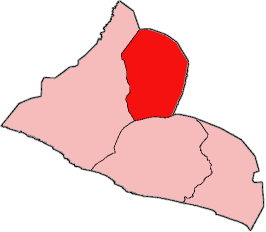
Location of Buah District in Grand Kru County

Buah District is one of four districts located in Grand Kru County, Liberia.
