= Chedepo District =

District of Liberia

Coordinates: 5.459°N 8.011°W

Chedepo District is one of 10 districts of River Gee County, Liberia. As of 2008, the population was 10,518.
