= Salayea District =

Coordinates: 7°36′56″N 9°29′49″W

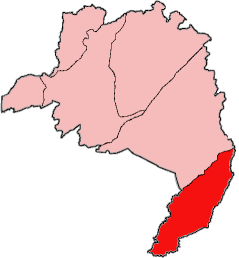
Location of Salayea District in Lofa County

Salayea District is an administrative district located in Lofa County, Liberia. In 2008, it had a population of 23,578.
