= Fen River District =

District of Liberia

Coordinates: 5°32′45″N 9°41′48″W

Fen River District is one of 8 districts of Rivercess County, Liberia. As of 2008, the population was 12,630.
