= Butaw District =

District of Liberia

Coordinates: 5°08′00″N 9°05′00″W

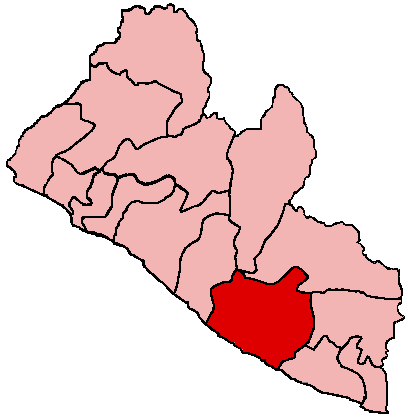
Map of Libera showing Sinoe County

Butaw District (Buto) is one of 16 districts of Sinoe County, Liberia. As of 2008, the population was 3,892.
