= Jorquelleh District =

Coordinates: 6.956°N 9.411°W

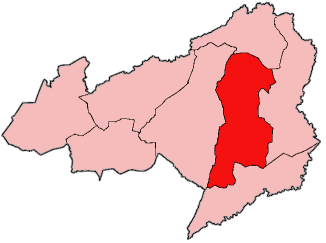
Location of Jorquelleh District in Bong County

Jorquelleh District is one of twelve districts of Bong County, Liberia. It has five third level subdivisions Jorpoo, Bellequelleh, Jorquelle, Gbarnshay, and Sheansuie.
