= Mambah-Kaba District =

One of the four districts of Margibi County, Liberia

- District
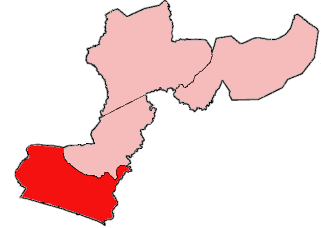
- Location of Mambah-Kaba District in Margibi County
- Coordinates: 6°16′48″N 10°30′29″W
- Country: Liberia
- County: Margibi

Mambah-Kaba District is one of four districts located in Margibi County, Liberia.
