= Jo River District =

Coordinates: 6.027°N 9.411°W

Jo River District is one of 8 districts of Rivercess County, Liberia. As of 2008, the population was 8,921.
