= Gbeapo District =

Coordinates: 5°12′00″N 8°00′00″W

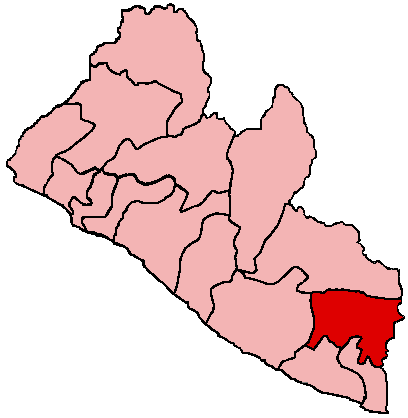
Gheapo District is located in River Gee county, shown in this map of Liberia

Gbeapo District is one of 10 districts of River Gee County, Liberia. As of 2008, the population was 10,934.
