= St. Paul River District =

District in Montserrado County, Liberia

Coordinates: 6.485°N 10.731°W

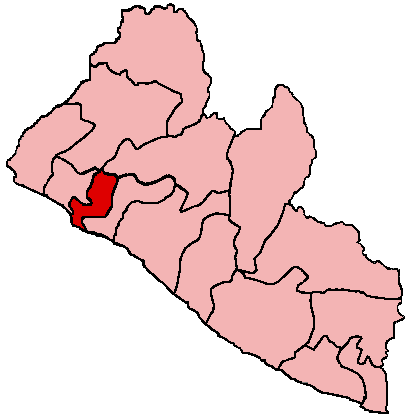
Map of Liberia showing Montserrado County

St. Paul River is a district located in Montserrado County, Liberia. It recorded a population of 71,831 in the 2008 census. It has no official administrative status. Its inhabitants are primarily Christians and members of the Bassa, Dey, or Kpelle tribes. Farming and fishing are the main economic activities along with some small scale trading. The district has one paved road.
