= Meinpea-Mahn District =

Coordinates: 6.693°N 9.057°W

Meinpea-Mahn District is one of 17 districts of Nimba County, Liberia. As of 2008, the population was 24,157.
