= Nyenebo District =

Coordinates: 4°54′36″N 7°43′12″W

Nyenebo District is one of 10 districts of River Gee County, Liberia. As of 2008, the population was 5,703.
