= Kulu Shaw Boe District =

Coordinates: 5.534°N 8.972°W

Kulu Shaw Boe District is one of 17 districts of Sinoe County, Liberia. As of 2008, the population was 8,555.
