= Glaro District =

Coordinates: 5°20′00″N 7°30′00″W

Glaro District is one of 10 districts of River Gee County, Liberia. As of 2008, the population was 4,992.
