= Seekon District =

District of Sinoe County, Liberia

Coordinates: 5°42′11″N 8°37′05″W

Seekon District is one of 16 districts of Sinoe County, Liberia. As of 2008, the population was 7,184.
