= Vahun District =

Coordinates: 8°2′37.94″N 10°29′26.45″W

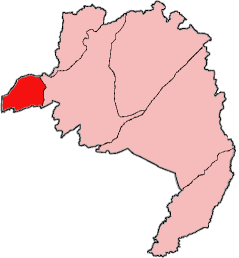
Location of Vahun District in Lofa County

Vahun District is one of six districts located in Lofa County, Liberia.
