= Potupo District =

Coordinates: 5.386°N 7.831°W

Potupo District is one of 10 districts of River Gee County, Liberia. As of 2008, the population was 7,337.
