= Pynes Town District =

District of Sinoe County, Liberia

Coordinates: 5°41′42″N 8°24′01″W

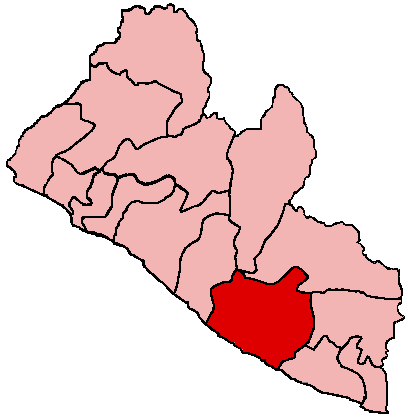
Map of Liberia showing Sinoe County.

Pynes Town District is one of 16 districts of Sinoe County, Liberia. As of 2008, it had a population of 4,167.
