= Salala District =

District of Bong County, Liberia

Coordinates: 6°44′45″N 10°06′30″W

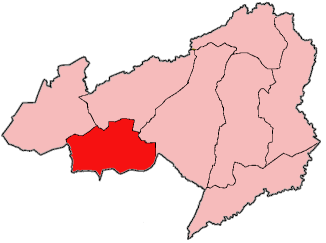
Location of Salala District in Bong County

Salala District is one of twelve districts in Bong County, Liberia. Multiple internally displaced person camps are located in the district. It has four third level subdivisions Konoyea, Konowulala, Nyanforquelleh, Kpartolor
