= Karforh District =

Coordinates: 5°16′41″N 8°09′36″W

Karforh District is one of 10 districts of River Gee County, Liberia. As of 2008, the population was 5,956.
