= Tuobo District =

Coordinates: 5°00′46″N 7°42′48″W

Tuobo District is one of 10 districts of River Gee County, Liberia. As of 2008, the population was 4,868.
