= Plahn Nyarn District =

District in Sinoe Count, Liberia

Coordinates: 5.306°N 9.034°W

Plahn Nyarn District is one of the 16 districts in Sinoe County, Liberia. The district is named after the Plain tribe and had a population of 6,805 as of the year 2008.

== History of The Plain Tribe ==
According to Dr. P. Potter Pajibo, the Plain Tribe derives its origin from the Cavalla River (Jubu), which is in the eastern part of Sinoe County. It's descendants link with the Grebo tribe, because of which the tribe is usually referred to as Bush Grebo.

The continued rift between the Grebo tribe and the Plain tribe stirred up a series of inter-tribal wars, and the latter was forced to leave in search of a suitable place of abode under the leadership of Tarjuo, a doctor and warrior. The people of the Plain tribe travelled for months and at last reached a mountain, now called “Tarjuo Mountain” in honor of their leader Tarjuo. He is also the person after whom the Tarjuozon tribes are named where they decided to settle.

The decision to make Tarjuo Mountain their home was unanimous among the people of the Plain tribe. They settled and remained there for a few years until the death of Tarjuo.

When Tarjuo died, the Plain tribe people felt discouraged; and after a deep contemplation, decided to leave the Tarjuo Mountain. Because of their strong conviction in superstition, the tribal people found the mountain unsuitable to live, and felt that upon their failure to leave, they would suffer an untimely death.

Under the leadership of one of Tarjuo's sons, Plain, after whom the tribe is named, the group left the Tarjuo Mountain in search of another place for settlement. For months they travelled many miles and finally reached a certain creek, called “Slae-Nee” meaning Magic Creek. This was their final destination and settlement. Tribal legend has it that when they reached this area, a vision of a bright future was formed; previous conflicts and disturbances were decreased. They believed that this creek also greatly and surprisingly aided their tribe during a war between them and the Krahn people.

The main cause of the tribe's decision to settle around the Slae-Nee Creek was for protection. Since the organization and establishment of the Plain tribe, its people have been worshipping the Slae – Nee Creek as one of their tribal gods.

The following chiefs are said to have been some of the most outstanding and influential leaders of the tribe:

Jowiehfueh, Sworrfueh, Gbartieh Jarfue, Gborpannon, Gbarweh Nuon, Karjah, Dopaetron, Wiehkue and Kujah Sworrfueh.

Because of lack of written records, nothing much can be said about the contributions they made. However, it is said that they had ably conducted and protected the affairs of the tribe.

Since its establishment, there have been diverse kinds of tribal governments. Since there was no mentioned central government at the time, the tribesmen organized themselves into a strong body of local tribal government and elected Jowiehfueh as their first chief or king. He is said to have faithfully conducted the affairs of the tribe to the best of his ability and remained in power until his death.

Since the death of the first king Jowiehfueh, there has been a succession of others up to the present as listed below:

Paramount Chiefs: Pantonteh, Jarkue Wolloh, Teah-Deboe Pajibo, Wrogbo Jah, Weagbah, Tanneh Weah and Torteh.

Clan Chiefs: Pantonteh, Kietegbeh, Nyonuwion, Nyenfueh, Tanneh Weah – Plahn, Weagbah – Kulu, Pobleh – Nyarn, Pallaywion - Shoah, Tanneh Weah - Plahn, Torteh - Nyarn, Falleh – Puea - Kulu, Garsaylee Toryen– Buer – Shoah, David Pyne - Plahn, Torteh - Nyarn, Wionjuo - Kulu, Garsaylee Toryen– Buer -Shoah, Brown Nyenfueh – Plahn/Nyarn

== Government ==
The tribe as a whole is divided into three main family groups comprising twelve subdivisions. The reasons for the divisions are due to repeated conflicts and dissatisfactions among the three distinct original families. They felt that this would enable them to multiply, expand and to build the tribe more effectively. They also wanted a separate and independent leadership for each division.

Below are the three original family groups and their subdivisions:

Plentarh Group: Chuoh, Sworrh, Kaetarh, Gedaquen

Snoh – Dea – Quen: Weorh, Tartouh, Wenjaoh, Saoh

Barlor – Quen : Chuoh, Swisslow, Tuon, Clayar – Quen

Legend suggests that all tribes were, from the beginning, wandering from place to place in search of suitable sites for settlements. The Plahn Tribe therefore did not come in contact with any tribal group in traveling from the Cavalla River area and Tarjuo Mountain.

== Economy and Culture ==
The sum total of the attainments and activities – the culture and economy – of the tribe is the producing of wooden utensils such as spoons, and pans; clay pots for cooking and water buckets; the first clothing were made or obtained from bamboo limps, barks of trees, etc.; melted rocks to make cutlasses and spears; and the making of rattan baskets and chairs acquired from other neighboring tribes.

== Religion ==
Their religious background was through their various tribal gods such as Slae – Nee Creek, the Rock Wiah, Kae – Gedoe – Plie, Nyanfurh, and Genopuarch. In the event of war with other tribe, a special selected group of the Plahn Tribe would go to these gods and make sacrifices. Their belief was that these gods would help avoid the war, and would make the tribe very wealthy and productive for abode.

Nowadays, most of these gods have been abandoned and replaced by Christianity. This is the result of colonialist missionary efforts affecting tribal culture and the inhabitants of the tribe.

== Present Day ==
There is no record of the Plahn Tribe when engaged in conflict or war with the colonists or the pioneers who came from America. There has also been no war between the Plahn and the Sinoe tribes, known as Murrayville Settlement in Sinoe County. These two tribes have been very friendly since their settlement and were kind to the colonists.

Today, members of the Plahn Tribe from Tarjuozon District in Sinoe County can be found all over the globe. According to the latest census from the Liberian government, Plahn Nyarn District has a little over 428 inhabitants.
