= Wee-Gbehy-Mahn District =

Coordinates: 6.902°N 8.859°W

Wee-Gbehy-Mahn District is one of 17 districts of Nimba County, Liberia. As of 2008, the population was 32,934.
