= Dugbe River District =

District of Liberia

Coordinates: 4.982°N 8.726°W

Dugbe River District is one of 16 districts of Sinoe County, Liberia. As of 2008, the population was 9,083.
