= Gbor District =

Liberian locality

Coordinates: 7.117°N 8.682°W

Gbor District is one of 17 districts of Nimba County, Liberia. As of 2008, the population was 10,875.
