= Foya District =

District in Lofa County, Liberia

Coordinates: 8°16′23″N 10°18′36″W

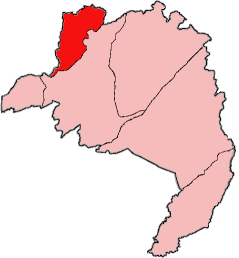
Location of Foya District in Lofa County

Foya District is one of six districts located in Lofa County, Liberia. Foya District is the most populous district in Lofa County, with 73,312 people as of the 2008 census. Foya is predominantly occupied by the Kissi tribe. Foya is about 450 km (280 mi) from Monrovia.

== Market ==
Foya town, located in the centre of the Liberian Kissi tribal area, had an important weekly market in the 1970s. Saturday's Foya market day was a colorful event with an important regional economic function. Foya has a weekend open-field market of the type seen in most rural parts of Africa.
