= Jaedepo District =

Coordinates: 5°20′00″N 8°10′00″W

Jaedepo District is one of 16 districts located in Sinoe County, Liberia. As of 2008, it had a population of 8,596.
