= Twan River District =

Coordinates: 7°10′N 8°25′W

Twan River District is one of 17 districts of Nimba County, Liberia. It lies in the central east of the county, bordering Côte d'Ivoire. Towns within the district include Garplay, Kparplay, and Senlay.

The eponymous river flows south through the centre of the district before joining the Nuon River (which forms part of the border between Liberia and Côte d'Ivoire) close to the district's southernmost point.

As of 2008, the population of Twan River District was 37,479.
