= Sarbo District =

District of Liberia

Coordinates: 5.161°N 7.634°W

Sarbo District is one of 10 districts of River Gee County, Liberia. As of 2008, the population was 5,320.
