= Wedjah District =

District of Sinoe County, Liberia

Coordinates: 5.308°N 8.811°W

Wedjah District is one of 16 districts of Sinoe County, Liberia. As of 2008, the population was 4,076.
