= Doe District =

District of Liberia

Coordinates: 6°55′54″N 9°06′54″W

Doe District is one of 17 districts of Nimba County, Liberia. As of 2008, the population was 35,918.
