= Garwula District =

Coordinates: 6.747°N 11.130°W

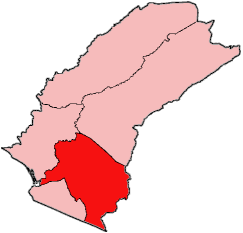
Location of Garwula District in Grand Cape Mount County

Garwula District is one of five districts located in Grand Cape Mount County, Liberia. As of the 2008 Census, it has a population of 26,936.
