= Bokon District =

District of Liberia

Coordinates: 5.026°N 8.463°W

Bokon District is one of 16 districts of Sinoe County, Liberia. As of 2008, the population was 4,417.
