= Lofa County =

County of Liberia

- County
- Flag
- Nickname: Tambah Nyumah
- Location in Liberia
- Coordinates: 7°55′N 10°0′W
- Country: Liberia
- Capital: Voinjama
- Districts: 6
- Established: 1964

Government
  - Superintendent: George Dunor

Area
  - Total: 9,982 km^{2} (3,854 sq mi)

Population (2022)
  - Total: 367,376
  - Density: 36.80/km^{2} (95.32/sq mi)
- Time zone: UTC+0 (GMT)
- HDI (2018): 0.418 low · 8th of 15

Lofa is a county in the northernmost portion of Liberia. One of 15 counties that constitute the first-level of administrative division in the nation, it has nine districts. Voinjama serves as the capital with the area of the county measuring 3,854 square miles (9,980 km^{2}). As of the 2022 Census, it had a population of 367,376, making it Liberia's fourth most populous county.

Lofa's County Superintendent is William Tamba Kamba. The county is bordered by Bong County to the south and Gbarpolu County to the west. The northwestern parts of Lofa border the nation of Sierra Leone, and the northeastern parts border Guinea. Mount Wuteve, the highest mountain in Liberia, lies in the north-central part of the county.

== History ==
Lofa County was established from the former Western Province in 1964. The civil war, which began in 1989, adversely affected the county. Many people left the area as refugees in 1999 and the early 2000s as it became a main focus of fighting during the Liberian civil war. The Red Cross said that in January 2004, many people had begun to return from refugee camps in neighboring Guinea and Sierra Leone. At that time, the county's population was estimated to be 34,310. Pakistan Army UNMIL peacekeepers were in place by 2005.

The largest city and county capital is Voinjama, with a population of 4,945. Foya is the second largest city (population 1,760). Lofa produced one of the nation's most respected leaders in the late vice president Dr. Harry F. Moniba who served from 1984 to 1990.

Another notable son of Lofa is President Joseph Nyumah Boakai, who previously served as Liberia's Vice President during the Ellen Sirleaf Administration for 12 years from 2006 to 2018, and is currently the President of Liberia as of 2024.

== Geography ==
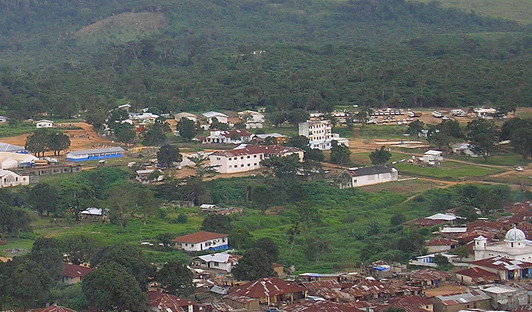
A view of Voinjama

The Western part of the county has coastal plains that rise to a height of 30 m (98 ft) above the sea-level inward to a distance of 25 km (16 mi). These plains receive a very high rainfall ranging from 4,450 mm (175 in) to 4,500 mm (180 in) per year and receive longer sunshine with a humidity of 85 to 95 percent. It is swampy along rivers and creeks, while there are patches of Savannah woodland. Rice and cassava interplanted with Sugarcane are the major crops grown in the region. Lofa County has a community forest, the Bluyeama, occupying an area of 44,444 ha (109,820 acres). It has three National proposed reserves, namely the Wologizi Mountain (99,538 ha (245,960 acres)), Wonegizi Range (37,979 ha (93,850 acres)) and Foya Forest (164,628 ha (406,800 acres)). It has the Foya Afforestation Project with an area of 9,062.4 ha (22,394 acres), which is designated as a National Plantation area.

== Demographics ==
As of 2008, the county had a population of 276,863: 133,611 male and 143,252 female. The sex ratio was 93.3 compared to 107.8 in the 1994 census. The number of households during 2008 was 45,095, and the average size of the households was 5.5. The population was 9.50 percent of the total population, while it was 8.00 percent in 1994. The county had an area of 3,854 sq mi, and the density per sq mi was 72. The density during the 1984 census stood at 52. Liberia experienced civil war during various times, and the total number of people displaced on account of wars as of 2008 in the county was 128,178. The number of people residing in urban areas was 83,150, with 40,592 males and 42,558 females. The total number of people in rural areas was 193,713, with 93,019 males and 100,694 females. The total fraction of people residing in urban areas was 30.03 percent, while the remaining 070 percent lived in rural areas. The number of people resettled as of 2008 was 32,959, while the number of people who were not resettled was 13,399. The number of literates above the age of ten as of 2008 was 79,196, while the number of illiterates was 66,907 making the literacy rate to 54.21. The total number of literate males was 47,865, while the total number of literate females was 31,331.

== Economy ==
As of 2011, the area of rice plantation was 40,500 ha (100,000 acres), which was 16.961 percent of the total area of rice planted in the country. The total production stood at 8570 metric tonnes. As of 2011, the number of Cassava plantations was 9090, which was 7.4 percent of the total area of cassava planted in the country. The total production stood at 11250 metric tonnes. The number of cocoa plantations was 11250, 29.1 percent of the total area of cassava planted in the country. The number of rubber plantations was 810, 1.3 percent of the total area of cassava planted in the country. The number of coffee plantations was 11,000, 49.3 percent of the total area of cassava planted in the country. As of 2008, the county had 4,323 paid employees, 38,287 self-employed people, 73,046 family workers, 4,565 people looking for work, 6,048 not working people, 23,682 people working in households, 40,653 students, 606 retired people, 4,951 incapacitated people, 1,582 part-time workers and 24,418 others, making the total working population of 222,161.

== Administration ==
Lofa County has six districts (2008 population): Foya District (100,000), Kolahun District (59,057), Salayea District (22,968), Vahun District (16,876), Voinjama District (40,730), and Zorzor District (40,352). The Legislature of Liberia was modeled based on the Legislature of the United States. It is bicameral with a Senate and the House of Representatives. There are 15 counties in the country, and based on the population, each county is defined to have at least two members, while the total number of members to the house, including the Speaker, is 64. Each member represents an electoral district and is elected to a six-year term based on popular vote. There were 30 senators, two each for the 15 counties, and they serve a nine-year term (30 senators, 15 counties, and nine years from 2011). Senators are also elected based on a plurality of votes. The vice-president is the head of the Senate and acts as president in the president's absence.
