= District 3, Grand Bassa County =

District of Liberia

Coordinates: 6°21′50″N 9°30′00″W

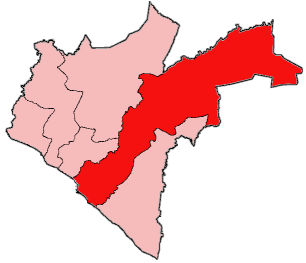
Location of District #3 in Grand Bassa County

District #3 is one of six districts located in Grand Bassa County, Liberia. The city of Buchanan, capital of Grand Bassa County, is located in the district.
