= District 1, Grand Bassa County =

District of Liberia

Coordinates: 6°15′58″N 10°07′23″W

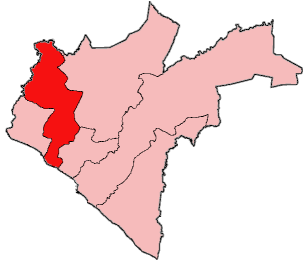
Location of District #1 in Grand Bassa County

District #1 is one of eight districts located in Grand Bassa County, Liberia.
