= Boe & Quilla District =

District of Liberia

Coordinates: 7°00′47″N 8°48′25″W

Boe & Quilla District is one of 17 sub-district of Nimba County, Liberia. As of 2008, the population was 18,262. The clans of Boe & Quilla district: Boe, Gosenter, Quella, Sarlay.
