= Norwein District =

Coordinates: 5°51′36″N 9°35′24″W

Norwein District is one of 8 districts of Rivercess County, Liberia. As of 2008, the population was 13,900.
