= Grand Bassa County =

County of Liberia

- County
- Flag

- Location in Liberia
- Coordinates: 6°15′N 9°45′W
- Country: Liberia
- Capital: Buchanan
- Districts: 8

Government
  - Superintendent: Karyou Johnson

Area
  - Total: 7,936 km^{2} (3,064 sq mi)

Population (2022 census)
  - Total: 293,557
  - Density: 36.99/km^{2} (95.81/sq mi)
- Time zone: UTC+0 (GMT)
- HDI (2018): 0.395 low · 13th of 15

Grand Bassa is a county in the west-central portion of the West African nation of Liberia. One of 15 counties that comprise the first-level of administrative division in the nation, it has eight districts. Buchanan serves as the capital with the area of the county measuring 3,064 square miles (7,940 km^{2}). As of the 2022 Census, it had a population of 293,557, making it the sixth most populous county in Liberia.

Grand Bassa's County Superintendent is Karyou Johnson. The county is bordered by Margibi County to the northwest, Bong County to the north, Nimba County to the east, and Rivercess County to the south and east. The western part of Grand Bassa borders the Atlantic Ocean.

== History ==
The port of Buchanan was constructed by LAMCO to serve the export of iron ore carried through the railway from Nimba. The civil war destroyed the port, railway, and township built by LAMCO. In 2005, LAMCO's facilities were taken over by ArcelorMittal, which has begun a gradual reconstruction. The once bustling port became a ghost town until the arrival of ArcelorMittal and the consequent prospects of employment. Under terms of a 2005 agreement with the national government, ArcelorMittal will give USD1 million each year to the county for iron ore exploitation, though these terms were revised in 2007.

== Notable people ==
- Stephen Allen Benson, President of Liberia (1856–1864)
- Joseph James Cheeseman, President of Liberia (1892–1896)
- Lewis Penick Clinton, Bassa prince, and missionary
- Thomas Buchanan, First official Governor of Liberia under the ACS in 1839 and Buchanan in Grand Bassa County was named after him
- Charles Walker Brumskine, Former Lawyer and Political Leader of the Liberty Party and Former Senate Pro–Tempore (July 1997–August 1999)
- Nyonblee Karnga-Lawrence, Senator (2013–Present) and Senate Pro-Tempore (2024–Present)
- Gbehzohngar Findley, Minister of Foreign Affairs (2018–Present) and Former Senate Pro–Tempore (2005–2014)
- Anthony Gardner, President of Liberia (1878–1883)
- James Skivring Smith, President of Liberia (1871–1872)
- James Skivring Smith Jr., Vice President of Liberia (1930–1944)
- Etweda Cooper, peace activist and superintendent of Grand Bassa (2012–2015)
- Faithvonic, singer and songwriter
- Sundaygar Dearboy, singer and songwriter

== Districts ==
Districts of Grand Bassa County include (2008 population):

- Commonwealth District (34,270)
- District 1 (25,180)
- District 2 (28,469)
- District 3 (47,721)
- District 4 (33,180)
- Neekreen District (32,058)
- Owensgrove District (13,687)
- St. John River District (10,274)

== See also ==
- Saint John River
