= District 4, Grand Bassa County =

District of Liberia

Coordinates: 5°46′30″N 9°46′12″W

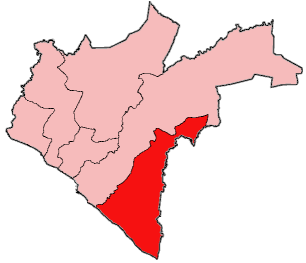
Location of District #4 in Grand Bassa County

District #4 is one of six districts located in Grand Bassa County, Liberia.
