= Buu-Yao District =

District of Liberia

Coordinates: 6°53′17″N 8°26′24″W

Buu-Yao District is one of 17 sub-district of Nimba County, Liberia. As of 2008, the population was 40,007.
