= Voinjama District =

Coordinates: 8°25′19″N 9°44′52″W

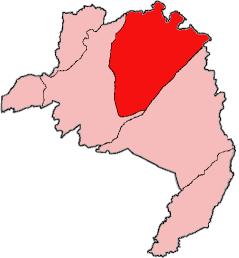
Location of Voinjama District in Lofa County

Voinjama District is one of six districts located in Lofa County, Liberia.
