= Greenville District =

District of Liberia

- District
- Interactive map of Greenville District
- Coordinates: 5°00′40″N 9°02′20″W
- Country: Liberia
- County: Sinoe

Population (2008)
  - Total: 16,434

Greenville District is one of 16 districts of Sinoe County, Liberia. As of 2008, the population was 16,434, making it the most populous district in the county.
