= Counties of Liberia =

Administrative division of Liberia

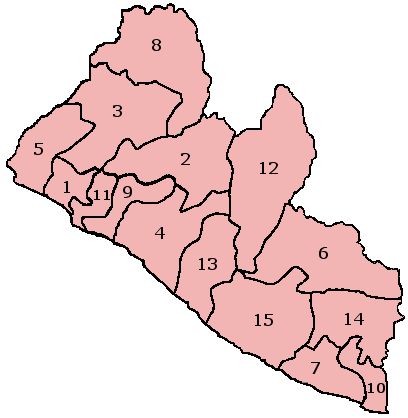
- A clickable map of Liberia exhibiting its fifteen counties.
- Category: Unitary state
- Location: Republic of Liberia
- Number: 15 counties
- Populations: 90,777 (Rivercess) – 1,920,914 (Montserrado)
- Areas: 4,020 km^{2} (1,553 sq mi) (Montserrado) – 11,600 km^{2} (4,460 sq mi) (Nimba)
- Government: County Government
- Subdivisions: District

The Republic of Liberia is divided into fifteen counties. Each is administered by a superintendent appointed by the President.

== Counties ==
Map #	County	Capital	Population	Total area		Number of districts	Date created	Parent county	Region
Map #	County	Capital	Population	mi^{2}	km^{2}	Number of districts	Date created	Parent county	Region
1	Bomi	Tubmanburg	133,705	750	1,200	5	1984	Montserrado	West
2	Bong	Gbarnga	467,561	3,386	8,770	12	1964	Bong (Note: Formerly part of Central Province.)	Central
3	Gbarpolu	Bopolu	95,995	3,741	9,690	5	2001	Lofa	West
4	Grand Bassa	Buchanan	293,689	3,064	7,940	8	1839	Grand Bassa (Note: Original administrative division.)	Central
5	Grand Cape Mount	Robertsport	178,867	1,993	5,160	6	1844	Grand Cape Mount	West
6	Grand Gedeh	Zwedru	216,692	4,048	10,480	8	1964	Grand Gedah (Note: Formerly part of Eastern Province.)	East
7	Grand Kru	Barclayville	109,342	1,504	3,900	19	1984	Maryland	East
8	Lofa	Voinjama	367,376	3,854	9,980	11	1964	Lofa (Note: Formerly part of Western Province.)	West
9	Margibi	Kakata	304,946	1,010	2,600	5	1985	Montserrado	West
10	Maryland	Harper	172,587	887	2,300	7	1857	Maryland	East
11	Montserrado	Bensonville	1,920,965	737	1,180	15	1839	Montserrado	West
12	Nimba	Sanniquellie	621,841	4,460	11,600	17	1964	Nimba	Central
13	Rivercess	River Cess	90,819	2,160	5,600	10	1985	Grand Bassa	Central
14	River Gee	Fish Town	124,653	1,974	5,110	10	2000	Grand Gedah	East
15	Sinoe	Greenville	151,149	3,914	10,140	20	1843	Simoe	East
	Total	Monrovia	5,250,187	37,482	97,080	158			

== See also ==
- List of Liberian counties by Human Development Index
- Administrative divisions of Liberia
- ISO 3166-2:LR
