= Kokoyah District =

Coordinates: 6.509°N 9.570°W

Kokoyah Administrative District
- Administrative District
- Location within Liberia
- Country: Liberia
- County: Bong County
- Time zone: UTC+0 (GMT)

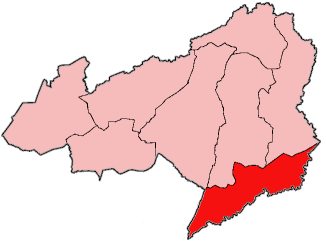
Location of Kokoyah District in Bong County

The Kokoyah Administrative District is one of twelve districts located in Bong County, Liberia. It has four third level subdivisions Bonwein, Senwein, Tukpablee, and Kokoyah
