= Zoe-Gbao District =

Coordinates: 6.948°N 8.762°W

Zoe-Gbao District is one of 17 districts of Nimba County, Liberia; and as of 2008, the population was 29,372.
