= Sinoe County =

County in Liberia

- County
- Flag

- Location in Liberia
- Coordinates: 5°20′N 8°40′W
- Country: Liberia
- Capital: Greenville
- Districts: 17
- Colony of Mississippi-in-Africa: 1835-1842
- Annexed by Liberia: 1842
- Established as a County: 1847

Government
  - Superintendent: Lee Nagbe Chea

Area
  - Total: 10,137 km^{2} (3,914 sq mi)
- Ranked 3rd in Liberia

Population (2022)
  - Total: 150,358
  - Density: 14.833/km^{2} (38.416/sq mi)
- Total population rank: 10th in Liberia
- Time zone: UTC+0 (GMT)
- ISO 3166 code: SI
- HDI (2018): 0.422 low · 7th of 15

Sinoe is one of Liberia's 15 counties and it has 17 districts. Greenville is the county's capital. As of the 2022 Census, it had a population of 150,358, making it one of the least populous counties in Liberia. Sinoe has the third-largest area of all Liberia's counties; it has the second least-dense population after Gbarpolu County. The County was originally a colony in the name Mississippi-in-Africa, under auspices of a chapter of the American Colonization Society as it was created with slaves from Mississippi to Liberia.

There are seventeen districts in the county and it has lower tropical forests which has mid size hills composed of various valleys and water courses. Sapo National Park (180,436 ha (445,870 acres), a National protected area, Sankwehn Proposed Reserve, occupying an area of 80,348 ha (198,540 acres), a National proposed reserve and LTPC Reforestation Project with an area of 154.2 ha (381 acres) are the major plantation areas in the county.

The flag is a green cross on a white background with the flag of Liberia in the top-left corner.

== History ==
Long settled by indigenous peoples, this area became colonized by more than 300 freed African-American slaves from Prospect Hill Plantation, Mississippi in 1835. The colony was originally called Mississippi-in-Africa, under auspices of a chapter of the American Colonization Society. Greenville was named after Judge James Green and was established with the freed Black Americans of the society in 1838. Green was instrumental in bringing a group of slaves from the Mississippi Delta to Liberia. The town was a prominent exporter of rubber, lumber and agricultural products. It was destroyed during the First Liberian Civil War but has been rebuilt. There is boat connectivity from the town to Monrovia and Harper.

== Geography ==
The county has lower tropical forests which has mid size hills composed of various valleys and water courses. These forests receive a very high rainfall ranging from 3,000 mm (120 in) to 4,100 mm (160 in) per year in two distinct seasons. It has evergreen forests. While in the uplands it is conducive for rice cultivation, the low-lying areas are conducive for yam, cocoa, plantains, potatoes, vegetables, rubber, coffee and sugarcane. Sinoe County has two community forests: Nitrian with an area of 958 ha (2,370 acres) and Nimopho with an area of 7,320 ha (18,100 acres). It has the Sapo National Park (180,436 ha (445,870 acres), a National protected area. Sankwehn Proposed Reserve, occupying an area of 80,348 ha (198,540 acres) is a National proposed reserve, while LTPC Reforestation Project with an area of 154.2 ha (381 acres)) is a National plantation area.

== Demographics ==
As of 2008 the county had a population of 102,391. With 54,767 males and 47,624 females, the sex ratio was 1.15:1, a marked increase from the 1.03:1 found at the 1994 census. The number of households during 2008 was 14,533 and the average size of the households was 6.4. The population was 3.10 per cent of the total population, while it was 2.90 per cent in 1994. The county had an area of 3,770 sq mi and the density per sq.mi was 27. The density during the 1984 census stood at 17. Liberia experienced civil war during various times and the total number of people displaced on account of wars as of 2008 in the county was 15,289. The number of people residing in urban areas was 17,519, with 9,053 males and 8,466 females. The total number of people in rural areas was 49,270, with 25,810 males and 23,460 females. The total fraction of people residing in urban areas was 17.11 per cent, while the remaining 048 per cent were living in rural areas. The number of people resettled as of 2008 was 32,832 while the number of people who were not resettled was 485. The number of literates above the age of ten as of 2008 was 23,907 while the number of illiterates was 34,812 making the literacy rate 40.71 per cent. The total number of literate males was 15,558 while the total number of literate females was 8,349.

== Economy ==
As of 2011, the area of rice plantation was 8,300 ha (21,000 acres), which was 3.476 per cent of the total area of rice planted in the country. The total production stood at 8000 metric tonnes. As of 2011, the number of cassava plantation was 6080, which was 5 per cent of the total area of cassava planted in the country. The total production stood at 680 metric tonnes. The number of cocoa plantation was 680, which was 1.8 per cent of the total area of cassava planted in the country. The number of rubber plantation was 440, which was 0.7 per cent of the total area of cassava planted in the country. The number of coffee plantation was 110, which was 0.5 per cent of the total area of cassava planted in the country. As of 2008, the county had 2,761 paid employees, 18,650 self-employed people, 8,661 family workers, 5,162 people looking for work, 8,419 not working people, 9,030 people working in households, 22,388 students, 185 retired people, 901 incapacitated people, 1,329 part-time workers and 5,374 others, making the total working population of 82,860.

== Districts ==
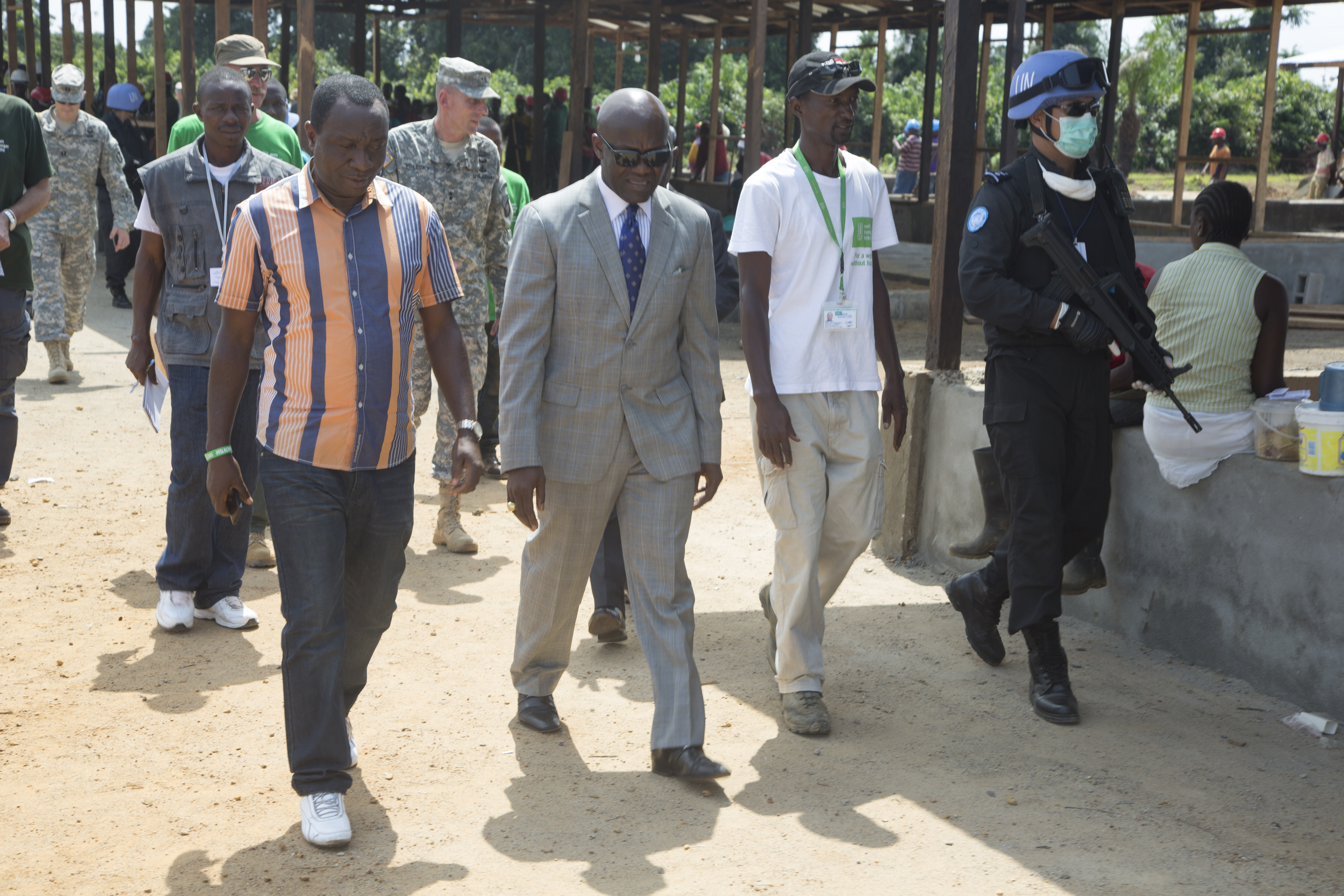
Ebola treatment mission in Greenville

The districts of Sinoe County are: Bodae District, Bokon District, Butaw District, Dugbe River District, Greenville District, Jaedae District, Jaedepo District, Juarzon District, Kpayan District, Kulu Shaw Boe District, Plahn Nyarn District, Pynes Town District, Sanquin District 1, Sanquin District 2, Sanquin District 3, Seekon District and Wedjah District The Legislature of Liberia was modeled based on the Legislature of United States. It is bicameral in nature with a Senate and the House of Representatives. There are 13 counties in the country and based on the population, each county is defined to have at least two members, while the total number of members to the house including the Speaker being 64. Each member represents an electoral district and elected to a six-year term based on popular vote. There were 26 senators, two each for the 13 counties and they serve a nine-year term (30 senators, 15 counties and nine years from 2011). Senators are also elected based on plurality of votes. The Vice-President is the head of the Senate and he also acts as President in his absence.
