= List of Liberian writers =

The following is a list of Liberian writers.

== A ==
- Mae Azango

== B ==
- Joseph Bartuah
- Kenneth Best (born 1938)
- Edward Wilmot Blyden (1832–1912)
- Martina Brooks (born 1983)

== C ==
- Helene Cooper (born 1966)

== D ==
- Roland T. Dempster (1910–1965)
- Abdullah Dukuly

== F ==
- Henry Boimah Fahnbulleh (born 1949)

== G ==
- Leymah Gbowee (born 1972)
- Hawa Jande Golakai (born 1979)

== H ==
- Musue Noha Haddad (1968–2013)

== K ==
- Knero (born 1985)
- Jeremy Teddy Karn (born 1996)

== L ==
- Ophelia S. Lewis (born 1961)

== M ==
- Fatima Massaquoi (1912–1978)
- Clarence Moniba (born 1979)
- Bai T. Moore (1916–1988)
- Wayétu Moore (born 1985)
- Samuel C. Morrison Jr. (born 1982)

== P ==
- Albert Porte (1937–2009)

== S ==
- Wilton G. S. Sankawulo (1937–2009)
- Vamba Sherif (born 1973)
- Rodney Sieh
- Michaela Songa (born 1986)

== T ==
- Hilary Teague (1832–1912)

== W ==
- Joseph Jeffrey Walters (c. 1860–1894)
- Patricia Jabbeh Wesley
- Gabriel I. H. Williams
- Samuel Kofi Woods (born 1964)

== See also ==
- List of African writers by country
