= Grand Cape Mount-3 =

Electoral district in Liberia

- Constituency for the House of Representatives of Liberia
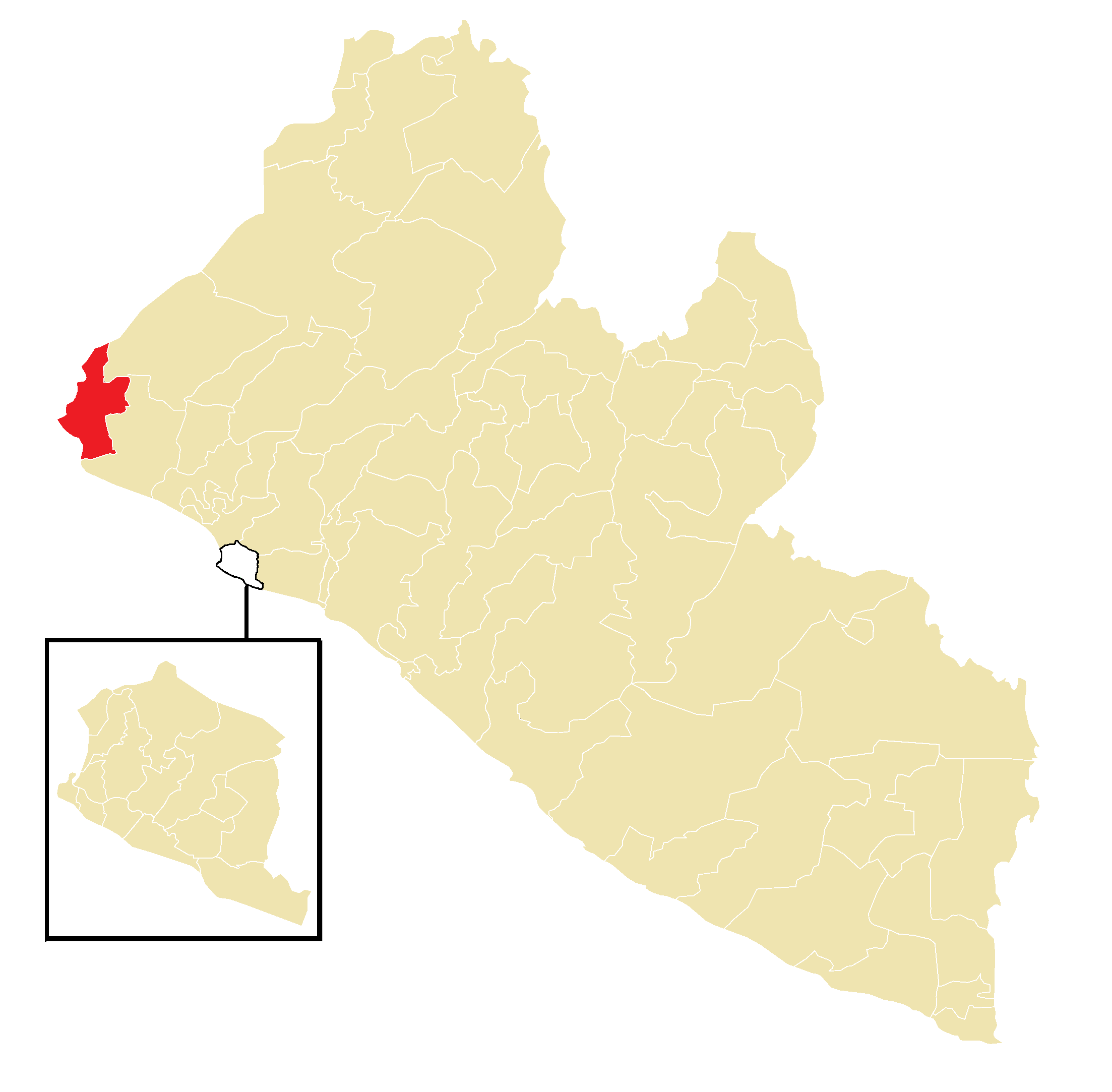
- Electorate: 31,447 (2023)

Current constituency
- Created: 2011
- Representative: Gbessie Sonni Feika

Grand Cape Mount-3 is an electoral district for the elections to the House of Representatives of Liberia. The constituency covers Tewor District, four communities of the Robertsport Commonwealth District (Weima, Tallah General, Kpallan and Kebba) as well as the Dazanbo community of Porkpa District.

== Elected representatives ==
Year	Representative elected	Party	Notes
2005	Mohammed Abraham Ware, Sr.	COTOL	
2011	Emerson V. Kamara	LTP	
2017	Emerson V. Kamara	CDC	
2023	Gbessie Sonni Feika	VOLT	

== Election results ==
2005 Grand Cape Mount County's 3rd House District Election
Candidate	Party	Votes	%
Mohammed Abraham Ware Sr.	Coalition for the Transformation of Liberia	3,151	37.99
Mambu Mahamudu Sonii	Independent	2,707	32.63
Mohammed Abdurahman Kiazolu	National Patriotic Party	680	8.20
Oliver Siafa Smith	Congress for Democratic Change	539	6.50
Ennish Lamie Fahnbulleh	Unity Party	453	5.46
J. Dinne Mohammed	National Reformation Party	238	2.87
Baindu Sonii	Liberty Party	225	2.71
Edwin Boakai Zoludua Sr.	Union of Liberian Democrats	173	2.09
Clarence C. Kiahon	Liberia Destiny Party	129	1.56
Total		8,295	100.00
Valid votes		8,295	94.19
Invalid/blank votes		512	5.81
Total votes		8,807	100.00

2011 Grand Cape Mount County's 3rd House District Election
Candidate	Party	Votes	%
Emerson V. Kamara	Liberia Transformation Party	2,552	18.67
Charles Boima Paasewe	Liberty Party	2,340	17.12
Kemo Kaibakai Sambola Sr.	Unity Party	1,844	13.49
Gladys Massa Kiawoin-Johnson	Independent	1,704	12.46
Kaddieyatu Darrah Findley	National Patriotic Party	1,457	10.66
Abuboakai Jadii Kiawen	National Reformation Party	1,278	9.35
James Kemokai	Alliance for Peace and Democracy	1,163	8.51
Arnold Burphy Fahnbulleh	Progressive Democratic Party	425	3.11
Samuel Kandakai Massaley I	Independent	400	2.93
Henrietta Victoria Kandakai	Independent	280	2.05
Mohammed Faud Kawah	Independent	229	1.67
Total		13,672	100.00
Valid votes		13,672	93.72
Invalid/blank votes		916	6.28
Total votes		14,588	100.00

2017 Grand Cape Mount County's 3rd House District Election
Candidate	Party	Votes	%
Emerson V. Kamara (Incumbent)	Coalition for Democratic Change	3,394	19.18
Charles Boima Paasewe	Liberty Party	2,574	14.55
Gbessie Sonii Feika	United People's Party	1,946	11.00
Victor Varney Watson	People's Unification Party	1,854	10.48
Fodee Kromah	Liberian People's Party	1,347	7.61
Elijah Gondiville Freeman	Independent	980	5.54
Suliman Vainga Kamara	Unity Party	953	5.39
Augustus Siafa James	All Liberian Party	850	4.80
A. Kundukai Jaleiba	Alternative National Congress	647	3.66
Abuboakai Jadii Kiawen	Victory for Change Party	511	2.89
Andrew Amah Jaliebah	Independent	507	2.87
A. Siafa Fahnbulleh	Movement for Democracy and Reconstruction	444	2.51
Abdullah A. Kromah	Movement for Economic Empowerment	440	2.49
Boima K. Metzger	Movement for Progressive Change	352	1.99
Songa Lawrence Yates	Liberia Transformation Party	336	1.90
Francis Opee-Musah Massaquoi	Coalition for Liberia's Progress	309	1.75
Hawa Corneh Bropleh	True Whig Party	247	1.40
Total		17,691	100.00
Valid votes		17,691	94.62
Invalid/blank votes		1,005	5.38
Total votes		18,696	100.00
