= Spoken word =

Type of performance art

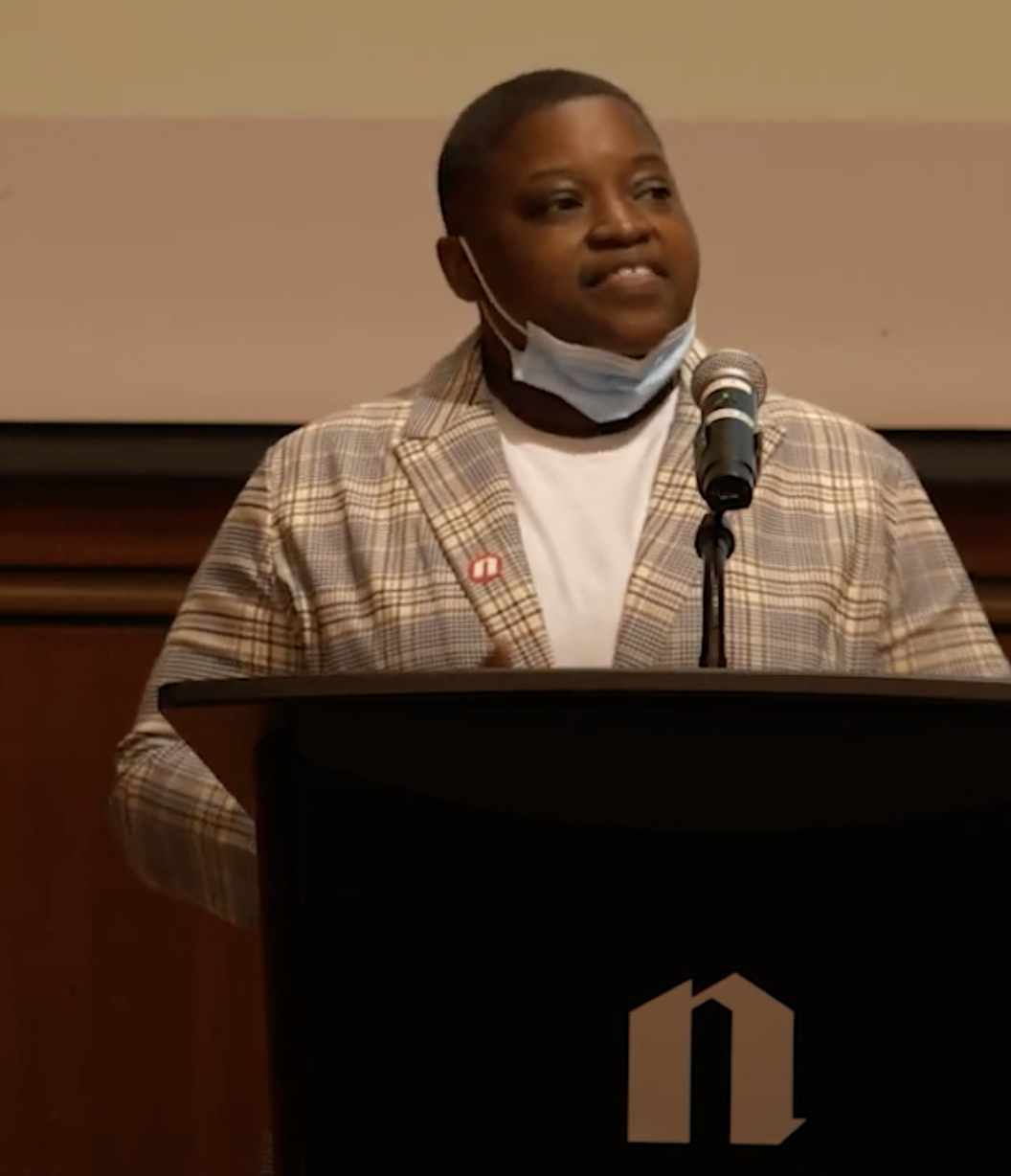
MacDowell Fellow Erika Renee Land performing at the Newberry Library in Chicago during the Surviving The Long Wars Triennial

Spoken word is an oral poetic performance art that is based mainly on the poem's as well as the performer's aesthetic qualities. It is a 20th-century continuation of an ancient oral artistic tradition, most notably the Greek oral-formulaic tradition, which produced the oldest works in the Western tradition, that focuses on the aesthetics of recitation and word play, such as the performer's live intonation and voice inflection. Spoken word is a catch-all term that includes any kind of poetry recited aloud, including poetry readings, poetry slams, jazz poetry, pianologues, musical readings, and hip hop music, and can include comedy routines and prose monologues. Unlike written poetry, the quality of spoken word is shaped less by the visual aesthetics on a page, and more from phonaesthetics or the aesthetics of sound.

== History ==
Spoken word has existed for many years; long before writing, through a cycle of practicing, listening and memorizing, each language drew on its resources of sound structure for aural patterns that made spoken poetry very different from ordinary discourse and easier to commit to memory. "There were poets long before there were printing presses, poetry is primarily oral utterance, to be said aloud, to be heard."

Poetry, like music, appeals to the ear, an effect known as euphony or onomatopoeia, a device to represent a thing or action by a word that imitates sound. "Speak again, Speak like rain" was how a poet of the Kikuyu people, an East African people, described her verse to author Isak Dinesen, confirming a comment by T. S. Eliot that "poetry remains one person talking to another".

The oral tradition is one that is conveyed primarily by speech as opposed to writing. In predominantly oral cultures proverbs (also known as maxims) are convenient vehicles for conveying simple beliefs and cultural attitudes. "The hearing knowledge we bring to the line of poetry is a knowledge of a pattern of speech we have known since we were infants".

Performance poetry, which is kindred to performance art, is explicitly written to be performed aloud and consciously shuns the written form. "Form", as Donald Hall records "was never more than an extension of content." Performance poetry in Africa dates to prehistorical times with the creation of hunting poetry, while elegiac and panegyric court poetry were developed extensively throughout the history of the empires of the Nile, Niger and Volta river valleys. One of the best known griot epic poems was created for the founder of the Mali Empire, the Epic of Sundiata. In African culture, performance poetry is a part of theatrics, which was present in all aspects of pre-colonial African life and whose theatrical ceremonies had many different functions: political, educative, spiritual and entertainment. Poetics were an element of theatrical performances of local oral artists, linguists and historians, accompanied by local instruments of the people such as the kora, the xalam, the mbira and the djembe drum. Drumming for accompaniment is not to be confused with performances of the "talking drum", which is a literature of its own, since it is a distinct method of communication that depends on conveying meaning through non-musical grammatical, tonal and rhythmic rules imitating speech. Although, they could be included in performances of the griots.

The poet and ethnographer Jerzy Ficowski has studied and written extensively about the Polska Roma tradition of spoken word. Though the vast majority of Polish-Romani people of that generation did not read or write, oral folk traditions were very strong. The most famous example is Papusza, who Ficowski discovered when he was following gypsy caravans on the road. Ficowski had her work translated and published, and she went on to become one of Poland's most iconic poets.

In ancient Greece, the spoken word was the most trusted repository for the best of their thought, and inducements would be offered to men (such as the rhapsodes) who set themselves the task of developing minds capable of retaining and voices capable of communicating the treasures of their culture. To sustain these massive oral narratives, performers utilized dactylic hexameter a structural framework for memory and live composition. This meter allowed the rhapsode to organize complex information into a predictable musical cadence, making the recitation of thousands of lines possible without written scripts. The ancient Greeks included Greek lyric, which is similar to spoken-word poetry, in their Olympic Games.

=== Development in the United States ===
In 1849, the Home Journal wrote about concerts that combined spoken word recitations with music, as demonstrated by actresses Sophie Schroder and Fanny Kemble.

Vachel Lindsay helped maintain the tradition of poetry as spoken art in the early twentieth century. Composers such as Marion Bauer, Ruth Crawford Seegar, and Lalla Ryckoff composed music to be combined with spoken words. Robert Frost also spoke well, his meter accommodating his natural sentences. Poet laureate Robert Pinsky said: "Poetry's proper culmination is to be read aloud by someone's voice, whoever reads a poem aloud becomes the proper medium for the poem." "Every speaker intuitively courses through manipulation of sounds, it is almost as though 'we sing to one another all day'." "Sound once imagined through the eye gradually gave body to poems through performance, and late in the 1950s reading aloud erupted in the United States."

Some American spoken-word poetry originated from the poetry of the Harlem Renaissance, blues, and the Beat Generation of the 1960s. Spoken word in African-American culture drew on a rich literary and musical heritage. Langston Hughes and writers of the Harlem Renaissance were inspired by the feelings of the blues and spirituals, hip-hop, and slam poetry artists were inspired by poets such as Hughes in their word stylings.

The Civil Rights Movement also influenced spoken word. Notable speeches such as Martin Luther King Jr.'s "I Have a Dream", Sojourner Truth's "Ain't I a Woman?", and Booker T. Washington's "Cast Down Your Buckets" incorporated elements of oration that influenced the spoken-word movement within the African-American community. The Last Poets was a poetry and political music group formed during the 1960s that was born out of the Civil Rights Movement and helped increase the popularity of spoken word within African-American culture. Spoken word poetry entered into wider American culture following the release of Gil Scott-Heron's spoken-word poem "The Revolution Will Not Be Televised" on the album Small Talk at 125th and Lenox in 1970.

The Nuyorican Poets Café on New York's Lower Eastside was founded in 1973, and is one of the oldest American venues for presenting spoken-word poetry.

In the 1980s, spoken-word poetry competitions, often with elimination rounds, emerged and were labelled "poetry slams". American poet Marc Smith is credited with starting the poetry slam in November 1984. In 1990, the first National Poetry Slam took place in Fort Mason, San Francisco. The poetry slam movement reached a wider audience following Russell Simmons' Def Poetry, which was aired on HBO between 2002 and 2007. The poets associated with the Buffalo Readings were active early in the 21st century.

Spoken word poets have served as poets laureate in US states and cities, for example, Yolanda Wisher named Poet Laureate of Philadelphia in 2016 and Jewel Rodgers named Nebraska State Poet in 2025.

=== International development ===
==== France ====
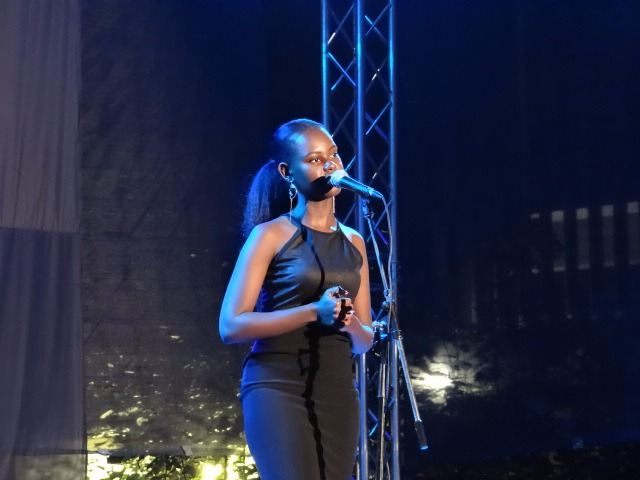
Kenyan spoken-word poet Mumbi Macharia

Outside of the United States, artists such as French singer-songwriters Léo Ferré and Serge Gainsbourg made personal use of spoken word over rock or symphonic music from the beginning of the 1970s in such albums as Amour Anarchie (1970), Histoire de Melody Nelson (1971), and Il n'y a plus rien (1973), and contributed to the popularization of spoken word within French culture.

In 2003, the movement reached its peak in France with Fabien Marsaud aka Grand Corps Malade being a forerunner of the genre.

==== UK ====
In the UK, musicians who have performed spoken-word lyrics include Blur, The Streets, Isaac Wood, and Kae Tempest.

==== Zimbabwe ====
In Zimbabwe, spoken word has been mostly active on stage through the House of Hunger Poetry slam in Harare, Mlomo Wakho Poetry Slam in Bulawayo as well as the Charles Austin Theatre in Masvingo. Festivals such as Harare International Festival of the Arts, Intwa Arts Festival KoBulawayo and Shoko Festival have supported the genre for a number of years.

==== Trinidad and Tobago ====
In Trinidad and Tobago, this art form is widely used as a form of social commentary and is displayed all throughout the nation at all times of the year. The main poetry events in Trinidad and Tobago are overseen by an organization called the 2 Cent Movement. They host an annual event in partnership with the NGC Bocas Lit Fest and First Citizens Bank called "The First Citizens national Poetry Slam", formerly called "Verses". This organization also hosts poetry slams and workshops for primary and secondary schools. It is also involved in social work and issues.

==== Ghana ====
In Ghana, the poetry group Ehalakasa, led by Kojo Yibor Kojo AKA Sir Black, holds monthly TalkParty events (collaborative endeavour with Nubuke Foundation and/ National Theatre of Ghana) and special events such as Ehalakasa Slam Festival and end-of-year events. This group has produced spoken-word poets including Mutombo da Poet, Chief Moomen, Nana Asaase, RhymeSonny, Koo Kumi, Hondred Percent, Jewel King, Faiba Bernard, Akambo, Wordrite, Natty Ogli, and Philipa.

The spoken-word movement in Ghana is rapidly growing, so that individual spoken-word artists such as Megborna, are continuously carving a niche for themselves and stretching the borders of spoken word by combining spoken word with 3D animations and spoken-word video game, based on his yet to be released poem, Alkebulan.

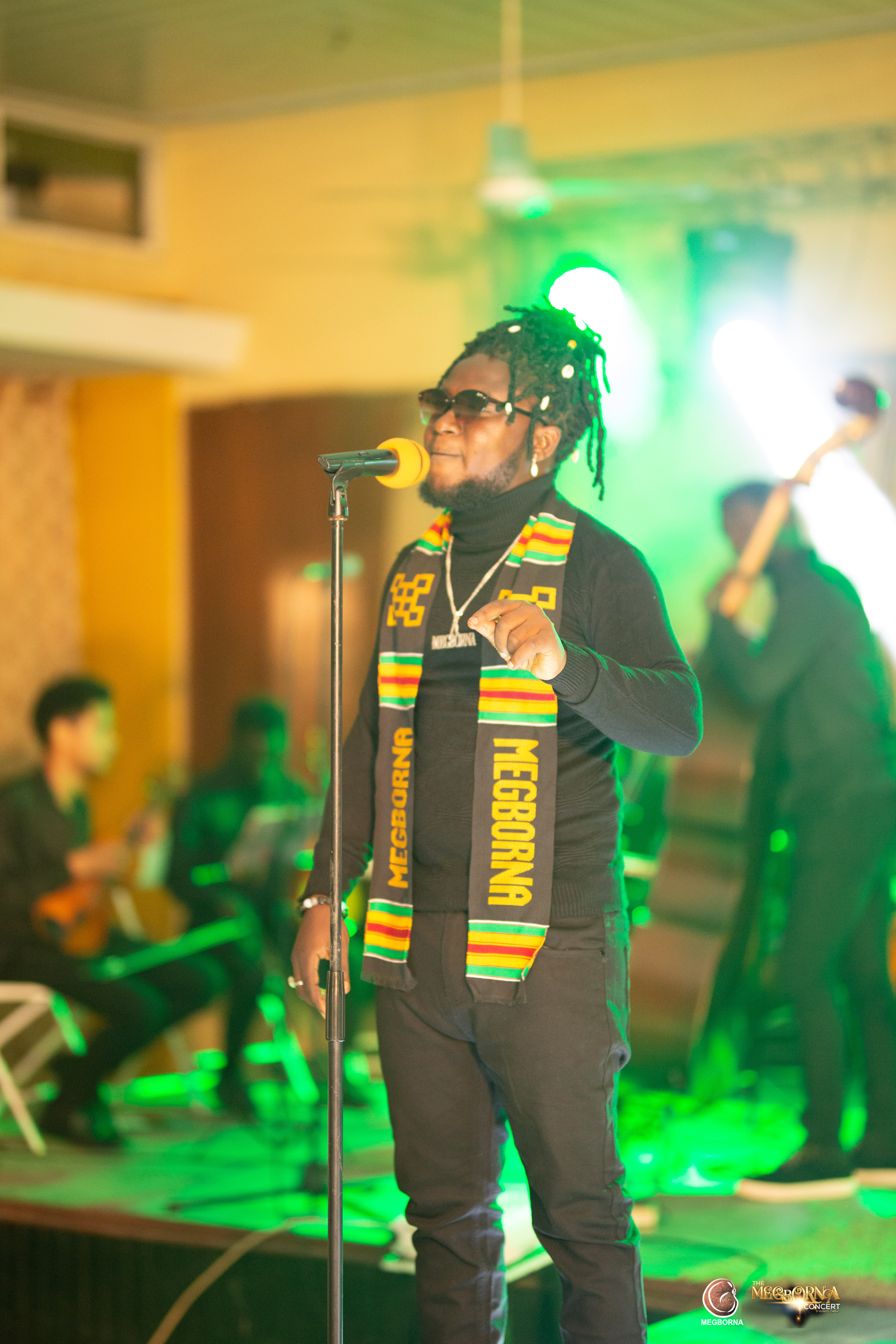
Megborna performing at the First Kvngs Edition of the Megborna Concert, 2019

In Kumasi, the creative group CHASKELE holds an annual spoken-word event on the campus of KNUST giving platform to poets and other creatives. Poets including Elidior The Poet, Slimo, T-Maine are key members of this group.

==== Kenya ====
In Kenya, poetry performance grew significantly between the late 1990s and early 2000s. This was through organisers and creative hubs such as Kwani Open Mic, Slam Africa, Waamathai's, Poetry at Discovery, Hisia Zangu Poetry, Poetry Slam Africa, Paza Sauti, Anika, Fatuma's Voice, ESPA, Sauti dada, Wenyewe poetry among others. Soon the movement moved to other counties and to universities throughout the country. Spoken word in Kenya has been a means of communication where poets can speak about issues affecting young people in Africa. Some of the well known poets in Kenya include Dorphan, Kenner B, Namatsi Lukoye, Raya Wambui, Wanjiku Mwaura, Teardrops, Mufasa, Mumbi Macharia, Qui Qarre, Sitawa Namwalie, Sitawa Wafula, Anne Moraa, Ngwatilo Mawiyo, Stephen Derwent.

== Competitions ==
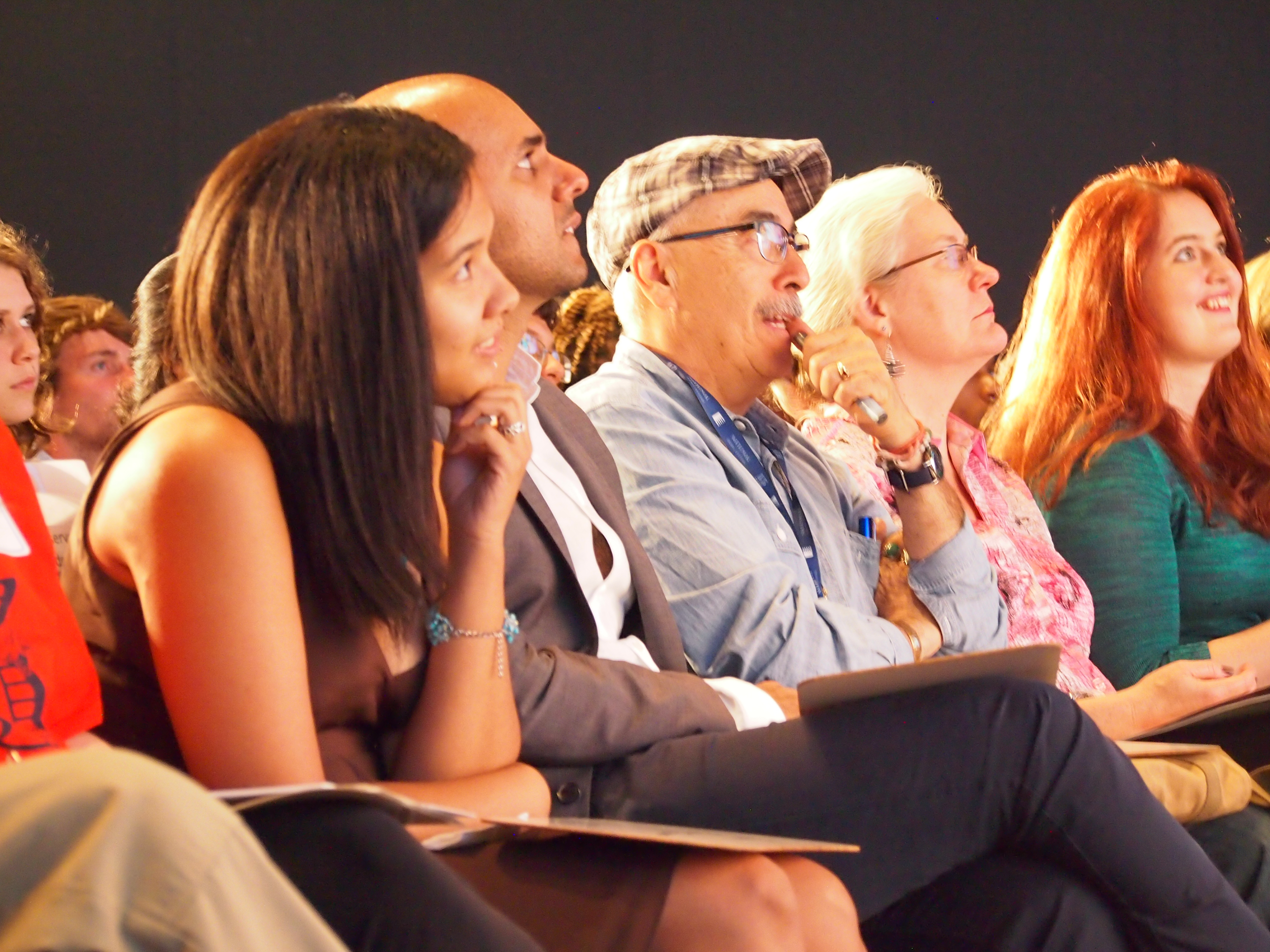
Judges from a poetry slam listen to the contestants.

Spoken-word poetry is often performed in a competitive setting. In 1990, the first National Poetry Slam was held in San Francisco. It is the largest poetry slam competition event in the world, now held each year in different cities across the United States. The popularity of slam poetry has resulted in slam poetry competitions being held across the world, at venues ranging from coffeehouses to large stages.

== Movement ==
Spoken-word poetry is typically more than a hobby or expression of talent. This art form is often used to convey important or controversial messages to society. Such messages often include raising awareness of topics such as: racial inequality, sexual assault and/or rape culture, anti-bullying messages, body-positive campaigns, and LGBT topics. Slam poetry competitions often feature loud and radical poems that display both intense content and sound. Spoken-word poetry is also abundant on college campuses, YouTube, and through forums such as Button Poetry. Some spoken-word poems go viral and can then appear in articles, on TED talks, and on social media sites such as Twitter, Facebook, and Instagram.

== See also ==
- Declamation
- Greek lyric
- Griot
- Haikai prose
- Hip hop
- List of performance poets
- Nuyorican Poets Café
- Oral poetry
- Orature
- Performance poetry
- Poetry reading
- Prose rhythm
- Prosimetrum
- Purple prose
- Rapping
- Recitative
- Rhymed prose
- Slam poetry
