= Trapeta Mayson =

Liberian-born poet, teacher, social worker and non-profit administrator

Trapeta B. Mayson
- Born: 1967 (age 58–59); Monrovia, Liberia
- Occupations: Poet; educator; social worker; non-profit administrator
- Writing career
- Genre: Poetry
- Notable works: She Was Once Herself, Mocha Memories, By the Roadside

Trapeta B. Mayson (born 1967) is a Liberian-born poet, teacher, social worker, and non-profit administrator residing in Philadelphia, Pennsylvania, US. Her writing primarily centers on the experiences of immigrants to the United States, the struggles of people dealing with conflict in Liberia, and the daily lives of average people, especially women and girls. She received a Master of Social Work from Bryn Mawr College and an MBA from Villanova University. She was selected as the fifth Poet Laureate of Philadelphia in 2019.

== Education and early life ==
Born in Monrovia, Liberia, Mayson immigrated to the United States in 1975 with her family at the age of eight and settled in Philadelphia. She grew up in the North Philadelphia and Germantown neighborhoods. According to Mayson, she considers herself to be a "sum of two continents... two countries, two sets of powerful people: my birth country of Liberia, and my beloved Philadelphia.”

She received her undergraduate degree in political science from Temple University in 1993. Mayson is a licensed social worker and received her Master of Social Work from the Bryn Mawr College Graduate School of Social Work and Social Research in 1995. In addition, she holds an MBA from the Villanova University School of Business.

== Career and writing ==
External videos
- “Outbound Poetry Festival: Trapeta Mayson & Monnette Sudler (1/4)", April 15, 2017, Part 1 of 4, Philadelphia Contemporary
- "A Poem by Trapeta B. Mayson - Experience", "Father", May 18, 2009, WHYY Education
- “GCabaret 2008 - Trapeta Mayson and Vena Jefferson", November 11, 2008, Leewayfoundation

In the early 2000s Mason was the vice president of education and family learning at the Please Touch Museum, a museum focusing on creating tactile learning experiences for younger children via "purposeful play" that also correlates to local and state educational standards.

From 2014 to 2018, Mayson served as the executive director for Historic Germantown, an historic preservation collective that manages and promotes 16 historic houses in the Germantown neighborhood of Philadelphia. During her tenure there, she worked with former Poet Laureate of Philadelphia Yolanda Wisher on various poetry events along with an initiative to bring artists into Historic Germantown with the goal of helping teens to engage with the historic properties and learn about Philadelphia and American history. The 2015 program, named Culture Keepers, partnered with the Parkway Northwest High School for Peace and Social Justice to pilot a program of historic site visits where students engaged in photography, captioning photos in Instagram, geocaching, and conducting oral history interviews with local elders. Later, local writers guided the high-schoolers in creating poems reflecting on their learned experiences, which the students presented live at a Historic Germantown open house.

Since 2019, concurrent with her poetry readings and outreach as Poet Laureate of Philadelphia, Mayson has worked as the program officer for a mental health service agency in the Kensington neighborhood of Philadelphia.

Mayson is a member of the Green Street Artists Cooperative, a multicultural artistic community in Germantown. Her written work has been exhibited at the Colored Girls Museum in Philadelphia. Some of her poetic verses are part of a mural by artist Ife Nii Owoo at the Logan Branch of the Free Library of Philadelphia.

The author has collaborated with jazz guitarist Monnette Sudler on the Sisters in Music project since 2000. They have multiple recordings, including two recent poetry and jazz pieces, "Scat" and "How we got through". In their spoken and sung word and music collaboration, Mayson extolls her female viewers to "Keep climbing" as "You can only go up from here." and to "Fly, girl, fly." despite their struggles against various oppressions, while Sudler encourages them to "Step up to the plate." in a softball-themed metaphor for life.

Mayson taught at the Art Sanctuary for 8 years, along with serving as an artist in residence at Art Sanctuary's after-school teen arts program, and Painted Bride Art Center’s ArtLAB Youth Poetry Series.

Her experience as an immigrant and a social worker has directly informed her writing, where she focuses on social issues such as immigration and mental illness, often with a perspective on gender and race, using a first-person, “everyday voice” that sometimes utilizes Liberian English. Her second chapbook, She Was Once Herself, tells the story of her mother's immigration from Liberia to the United States, her struggles and triumphs in adapting to a new country, the family's problems obtaining citizenship, and later her nervous breakdown with subsequent diagnosis of schizophrenia.

In her poem "We Are All Trees Here", Mayson relates how immigrants to the United States feel as they are labeled as enemies in their new country and experience fear from being undocumented, using the metaphor of sapo trees for family members struggling for survival in forests that are threatened by clearcutting. In "Father", the poet creates a vignette of a nattily-dressed older man who was laid-off from his workplace after many years, and must now work multiple low-wage jobs to support his family. In "First Job Advice", an older Liberian immigrant gives advice to her recently arrived compatriot about how to serve as a cleaning woman for an upper-class family, so that the other woman can earn money and send for her children to come to the United States in order that they "won't have to know the first jobs we do".

Mayson's tenure at Historic Germantown provided background for some of her poetry honoring African-American slaves, such as her poem "Happy birthday Dinah" about a slave named Dinah who resided at the Stenton Mansion in the Logan section of Philadelphia, and was enslaved by family members of statesman and former mayor James Logan.

Her experience in mental health care has prompted Mayson to seek out new partnerships that use writing to educate the public about mental health issues, such as recognizing Mental Health Awareness Month, or considering suicide rates and creating "healing verse" for communities. In past workshops, the author has fostered the creation of toolkits for healing that she calls "Recipe For", in which participants reveal the key issues impacting their lives, and facilitators assist them to create a list of writing "ingredients" that they can use independently to promote self-healing. In addition, she has conducted poetry and writing workshops with LGBTQ communities, undocumented immigrants, incarcerated people, women survivors of domestic abuse, and sex workers, among other marginalized groups, in which her purpose is to provide a platform to empower people to speak who often do not have the opportunity to have their voices heard.

In January 2021, Mayson launched the Healing Verse Philly Poetry Line, a toll-free phone number where callers can hear a 90-second poem authored by a poet connected with Philadelphia, as well as obtain information about how to access mental health care in the city.

== Works by Trapeta B. Mayson ==
Books of poetry

- 2018: She Was Once Herself, OCLC 1055273795
- 2008: Mocha Melodies.
- 2004: By the Roadside: For Liberian Survivors of War. OCLC 1055273795

Contributor to periodicals and anthologies

- 2008: "Letter to my sister", The American Poetry Review, v37 n4 (20080701): 28, ISBN 9781944211615 OCLC 1049785850

Mayson has also published in periodicals such as Aesthetica magazine; the American Poetry Review; Aura: A University of Alabama Literary Journal; Cave Canem's Literary Review; Epiphany Literary Journal; Margie: The American Journal of Poetry and Strong Medicine: American Journal of Poetry.

== Awards and honors ==
Mayson was chosen as the fifth poet laureate of Philadelphia in 2019, under the auspices of the Free Library of Philadelphia. According to the selection committee, the poet was chosen because of her ability to balance a full-time poetic writing practice with participation in many local Philadelphia organizations. According to the poet, in her role she aspires to “touch base with social service agencies, particularly those pertaining to mental health, in [Philly’s] communities.” She considers the role to be “...like a poetry ambassador for the city, ... Engaging communities, young people, people from all over the city, and engaging them in the creation of poetry, appreciation of poetry.”

In 2019, she was awarded an Aspen Words Emerging Writers fellowship from the Aspen Institute. She also served as a juror for the 2019 Scholastic National Writing Awards from the Alliance for Young Artists & Writers in the category of Poetry.

The author was nominated for a Pushcart Prize in 2016.

From the Leeway Foundation, she received both an Art and Change Grant in 2014 and a Transformation Award in 2007.

The poet was a 2002 fellow of the Pew Center for Arts and Heritage.

She was a fellow of the Pennsylvania Council of the Arts in both 2000 and 2004.

== See also ==
- List of Liberian writers
- List of African writers by country
- Liberian Americans
- List of Villanova University Alumni
