= Cape Mount =

Cape Mount may refer to:

- Cape Monze, a beach in Pakistan
- Cape Mount Nature Conservation Unit, a reserve in Liberia
- Grand Cape Mount County, a county in Liberia
