= Grand Cape Mount-1 =

Electoral district in Liberia

- Constituency for the House of Representatives of Liberia
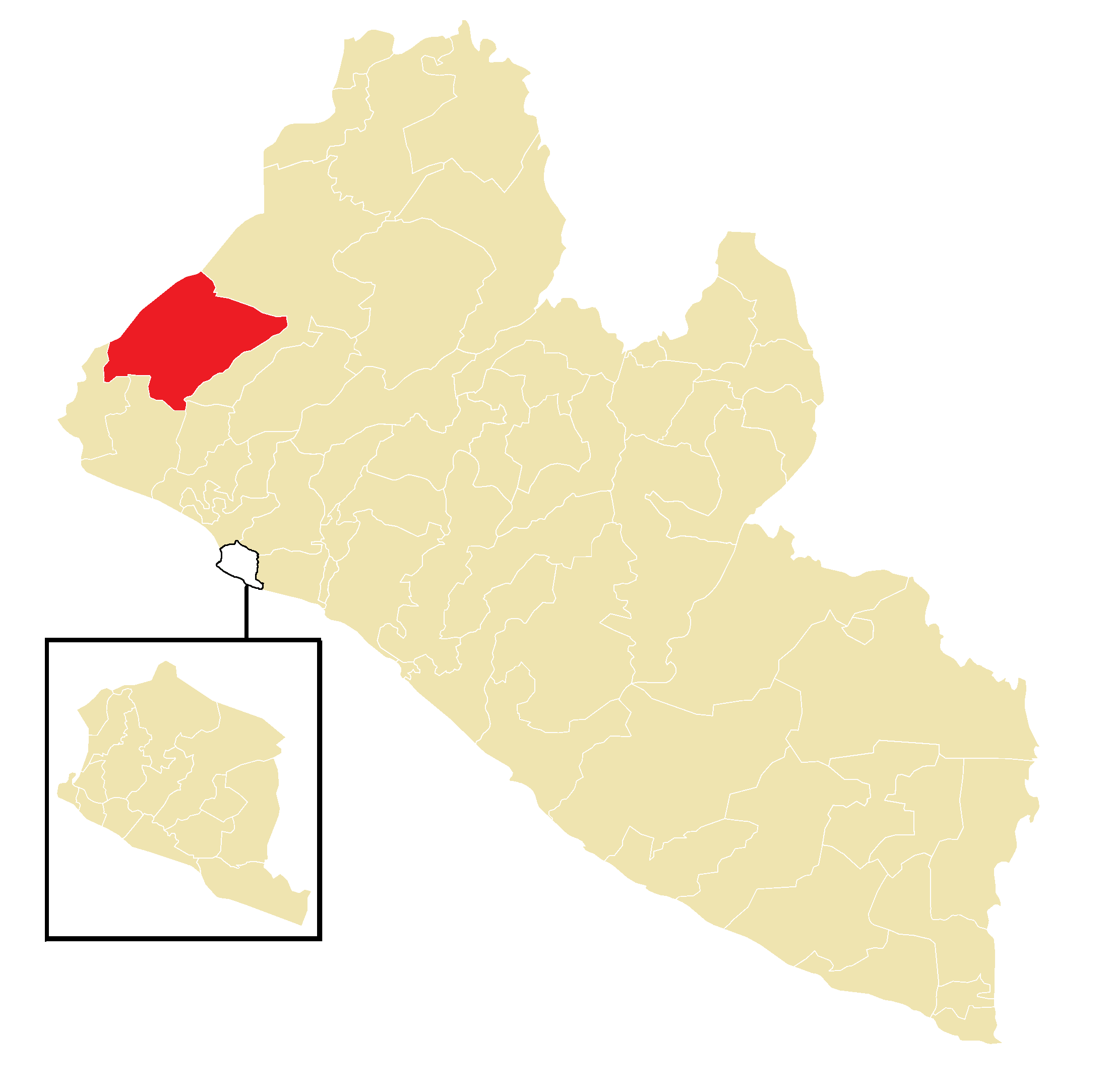
- Electorate: 26,631 (2023)

Current constituency
- Created: 2023
- Representative: Bintu Massalay (2024-Present)

Grand Cape Mount-1 is an electoral district for the elections to the House of Representatives of Liberia. The constituency covers Gola Konneh District (except Jenne Brown community) and Porkpa District (except Dazanbo community).

== Elected representatives ==
Year	Representative elected	Party	Notes
2005	James Amsu Benson	COTOL	
2011	Aaron B. Vincent	NRP	
2017	Bob H. Sheriff	Ind.	
2023	Bintu Massalay	CDC	

== Election results ==
2005 Grand Cape Mount County's 1st House District Election
Candidate	Party	Votes	%
James Amsu Benson	Coalition for the Transformation of Liberia	2,631	36.40
Charles Boima Paasewe	Liberty Party	1,728	23.91
Hamidu Majeed Getaweh	National Patriotic Party	627	8.67
Lawrence M. Songa Yates	Congress for Democratic Change	540	7.47
D. Caesar B. Freeman	Unity Party	438	6.06
Edwin Semaila Fahnbulleh	Union of Liberian Democrats	338	4.68
Kromah Tito Samai	Liberia Destiny Party	328	4.54
Arthur Adama Kawah	National Reformation Party	236	3.27
Safiyatu Alice-Massaquoi Roques	Independent	203	2.81
Ansumana Kpaka Sr.	Reformed United Liberia Party	159	2.20
Total		7,228	100.00
Valid votes		7,228	94.62
Invalid/blank votes		411	5.38
Total votes		7,639	100.00

2011 Grand Cape Mount County's 1st House District Election
Candidate	Party	Votes	%
Aaron B. Vincent	National Reformation Party	2,694	25.91
Simeon Boima Taylor	Congress for Democratic Change	2,101	20.21
Steven Dindo Seimavula	Independent	1,731	16.65
Tenneh V. Simpson-Kpedebah	Unity Party	1,255	12.07
Bob Harley Sheriff	National Democratic Party of Liberia	1,144	11.00
Philip Momoh Quaye	Liberty Party	817	7.86
Maxwell Lami Mackie Jones	National Democratic Coalition	361	3.47
Abass B. Kamara	Liberia Transformation Party	168	1.62
Boakai J. Kromah	Victory for Change Party	127	1.22
Total		10,398	100.00
Valid votes		10,398	91.66
Invalid/blank votes		946	8.34
Total votes		11,344	100.00
