= Amymusu Jones =

Liberian jurist (c.1948–2018)

- Born: Amymusu K. Jones c. 1948; Robertsport, Liberia
- Died: 2018 (age 69-70)
- Education: L’institut Catholique, Hunter College and Louis Arthur Grimes School of Law
- Occupation: Judge
- Known for: First female judge in Liberia

Amymusu K. Jones (c. 1948 - 2018) was a Liberian jurist and the first woman appointed magistrate of the Monrovia Magisterial Court in 1994, and was the longest circuit judge of Grand Cape Mount County. She retired from service in 2018 and died 30 days later.

== Background and career ==
Jones was born in Robertsport, Grand Cape Mount County. She started her early education at Robertsport and at Konola Academy before moving to France where she acquired a Certificate in French Language at the L’institut Catholique in Paris. She obtained a Bachelor of Arts degree from Hunter College, City University of New York in 1979 and a Law Degree from Louis Arthur Grimes School of Law, University of Liberia in 1988.

Jones began her legal practice with Jones and Jones Law Firm in Monrovia and was later appointed Legal Counsel at the Ministry of Finance. She served as Judge of the Debt, Probate and other circuit courts before her nomination by Liberian President and confirmed by the Liberian Senate as Resident Judge of the 5th Judicial Circuit Court of Grand Cape Mount County, at the Temple of Justice In August 2002, becoming the first woman and longest-serving judge of the 5th Judicial Circuit Court for 12 years.

In that year she was chosen to be among the international delegates who were appointed to oversee the elections in nearby Sierra Leone. Jones was recorded as representing the Mano River Union Women's Network by the Carter Center who oversaw the work.

Jones retired from service in July 2018 and died a month later on 3 August.
