= Roland T. Dempster =

Liberian writer

Roland Tombekai Dempster (1910–1965) was a Liberian writer and literary figure. He was born in Tosoh (on the banks of Lake Piso), Grand Cape Mount County in the Republic of Liberia. He wrote The Mystic Reformation of Gondolia in 1953. On January 4, 1960, he wrote A Song Out of Midnight: Souvenir of the Tubman-Tolbert Inauguration. He also wrote the poem "Africa's Plea".

== Published works ==
- 1953 - The Mystic Reformation of Gondolia: Being a Satirical Treatise on Moral Philosophy.
- 1960 - A Song Out of Midnight: Souvenir of the Tubman-Tolbert Inauguration.
