= Bombotown =

Village in Grand Cape Mount County, Liberia

- Location in Liberia
- Coordinates: 6°45′29″N 11°22′15″W
- Country: Liberia
- Region: Grand Cape Mount County

Bombotown is a village and suburb of Robertsport in Grand Cape Mount County on the northern coast of Liberia.

It is located about 300 m from the city.
