= Martina Brooks =

Liberian female journalist

Martina Brooks.
- Born: 21 November 1983 (age 42); New Kru Town, Montserrado County, Liberia
- Education: University of Liberia (BBA, 2013)
- Occupations: Journalist, Radio Producer
- Years active: 2005–present
- Height: 5 ft 9 in (1.75 m)

Martina Brooks (born 21 November 1983) is a Liberian journalist, a senior radio producer with the United Nations Mission in South Sudan, and the former vice-president of the Sports Writer Association of Liberia.

She is reported, as by 2017, to be the first Liberian female broadcast journalist to be awarded the regional award of ‘The West Africa On-Air Personality Award’

== Journalism ==
In 2005, Brooks took up an internship at the United Nations Mission in Liberia (UNMIL) Radio in Monrovia. At the end of her internship, she evolved into a sports reporter, becoming a noted female sports journalist. She chose to remain at UNMIL Radio.

At UNMIL Radio, she took on the roles of an "editorial coordinator, breakfast show presenter as well as other programs, including [the role of] providing supervision for youth producers."

She has covered events ranging from Liberia Football Association league games, the Liberian National County Meet, to the Liberia Marathon. She has used her influence to motivate and inspire the younger generation and women to pursue sports journalism.

Brooks was named as the Sports Writer Association of Liberia's Most Improved Sports Journalist in 2011.

In 2017, she was awarded ‘The West Africa On-Air Personality Award’

== Sports Writer Association of Liberia ==
In 2011, she was elected as the Vice President of the Sports Writer Association of Liberia.

== Awards and recognition ==
- West Africa’s On-Air Personality: 2017
