= Airea D. Matthews =

American poet

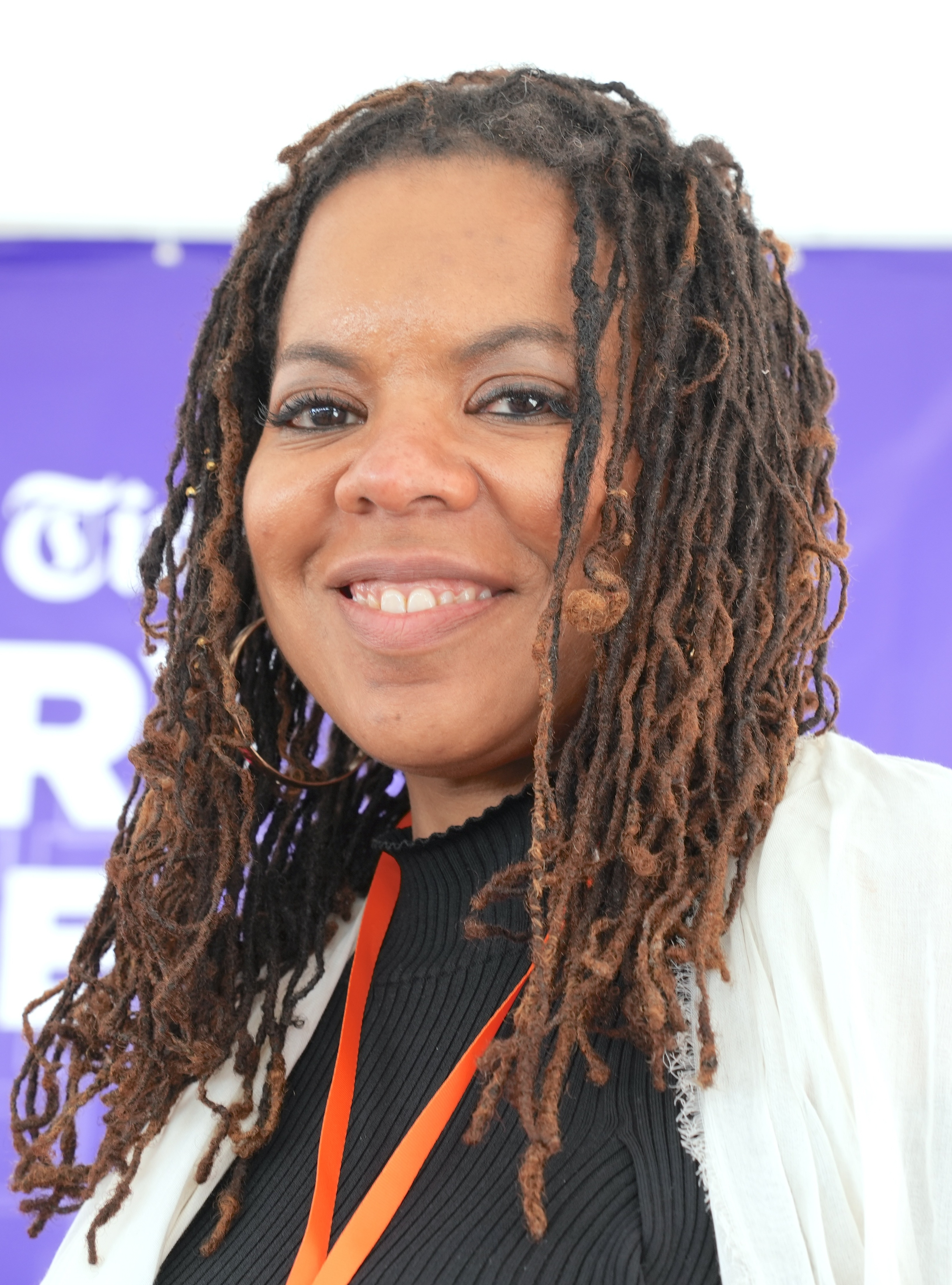
- Matthews at the 2025 Los Angeles Times Festival of Books
- Education: University of Pennsylvania; University of Michigan, Ann Arbor
- Writing career
- Genre: Poetry

Airea Dee Matthews is an American poet. She is the Provost and Professor of Creative Writing at Bryn Mawr College. She was named the 2022–23 Poet Laureate of Philadelphia.

== Education and early life ==
Matthews received her B.A. in economics from the University of Pennsylvania. She holds an M.F.A. in poetry from the Helen Zell Writers’ Program and an M.P.A. in Social Policy from Gerald R. Ford School of Public Policy, both at the University of Michigan, Ann Arbor.

== Career and writing ==
Apart from her professorship at Bryn Mawr, Matthews was a visiting professor and scholar at the Institute for the Study of Global Racial Justice at Rutgers University. There she helped to develop the Poets and Scholars Summer Writing Retreat and the “Race, In Theory” Fellows Humanities Seminar.

Her work has appeared in Best American Poetry 2015, American Poet, Four Way Review, The Missouri Review, Muzzle, The Baffler, Callaloo, Indiana Review, WSQ, SLAB, Michigan Quarterly Review, and Vida: Her Kind.

== Works ==
- Simulacra, Yale University Press, March 2017. ISBN 9780300227932, OCLC 999894143
- Bread and circus, Scribner, 2023. ISBN 9781668011454, OCLC 1347427680

== Awards and honors ==
In January 2022, Matthews was chosen as the sixth Poet Laureate of Philadelphia for the 2022–2023 term.

Matthews was awarded a fellowship from the Pew Center for Arts and Heritage in 2020.

In 2016, she won the Yale Series of Younger Poets award, the Rona Jaffe Foundation Writers' Award, and the Louis Untermeyer Scholarship in Poetry from the 2016 Bread Loaf Writers’ Conference. In 2017, she was a James Merrill House fellow.

In 2024 she received a PEN Oakland – Josephine Miles Award for Bread and Circus.
