= Robertsport =

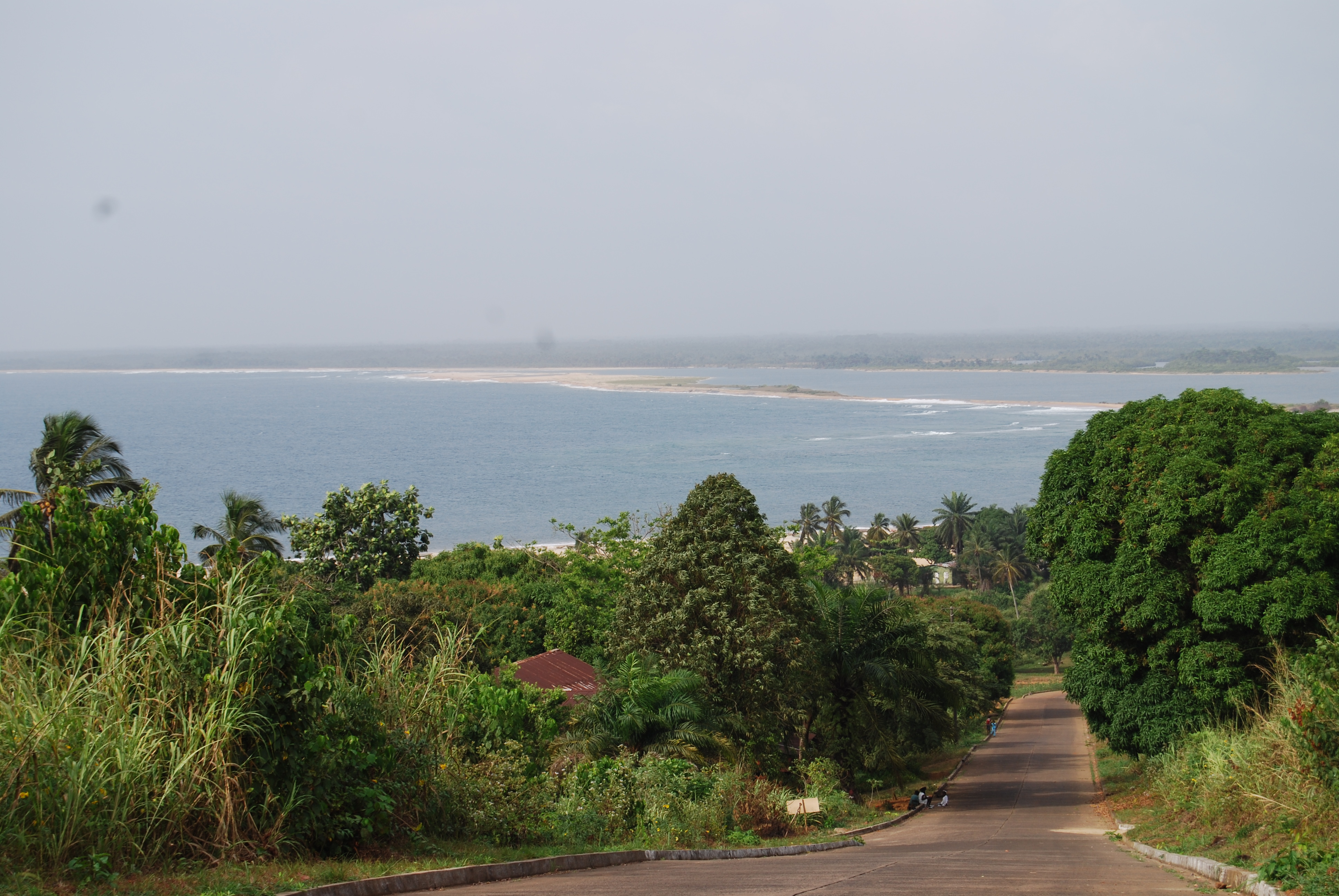

- Location in Liberia
- Coordinates: 6°45′N 11°22′W
- Country: Liberia
- County: Grand Cape Mount County
- District: Commonwealth District

Population (2008)
  - Total: 3,933
- Climate: Am

Robertsport is a town in western Liberia, about 10 miles (16 km) from the Sierra Leone border. It is named after Joseph Jenkins Roberts, the first president of Liberia.

The town lies on Cape Mount peninsula, a spit of land separating the brackish lagoon Lake Piso from the Atlantic Ocean, 50 mi (80 km) north-west of Monrovia. It serves as the capital of Grand Cape Mount County and is the home of the city corporation.

== History ==
In the mid-15th century, the Portuguese navigator Pedro de Sintra reached the cape, a 1,000-foot high granite promontory, which he named Cabo do Monte (Cape Mount). Cape Mount was the site of Dutch trading post, which turned out to be very hard to defend. The post never became self-sufficient, and habitually required assistance from the station at Elmina, about 750 miles away by sea. Théodore Canot, a writer and slave-trader, established a settlement in the area in 1840. In 1849 the Liberian government signed a treaty with the Vai people, acquiring the territory of Cape Mount and subsequently founding Robertsport in 1856.

Robertsport used to host the Tubman Center of African Culture, which was built in 1964 to commemorate William V.S. Tubman's sixty-ninth birthday. The institution was meant to be a world-wide center of research, and to support and promote African studies. The civil war destroyed the structure, and only the ruins remain.

Since the Second Liberian Civil War, the town, still mostly a fishing village, is being developed as a seaside resort for surfing. American visitors coming to the area after 2003 met up with a local, Robert Lomax, whom they taught to surf. Lomax taught others how to surf, including Philip Banini, who became a surfing teacher and owner of a guesthouse for surfers. As of 2022, the Robertsport Surf Club was expected to start owning its own beach property for surfing lessons and fishing trips. The film “We The Surfers” about the annual African national Surfing titles held in Robertstown and it’s participants including women surfers Faith and Butterfly from Robertstown was showcased at the Ocean Film Festival 2025.

== Geography ==
Robertsport's coast contains five point breaks, including three main points known for surfing: Fisherman's Point, closest to town; Cotton Trees; and Cassava Point.

In 2009, Liberia's surfer, Alfred Lomax, took a reporter to see what he considered the best surfing spots, "'This here,' he says pointing out to the waves surging down the beach, 'we call this Camp Point. Then, up the beach, is Cutting Point — that’s where they break both ways.'"

Nearby towns and villages include Bassa Community (0.6 nm), Kru Town (0.3 nm), Bombotown (0.3 nm) and Gomboja (0.3 nm).

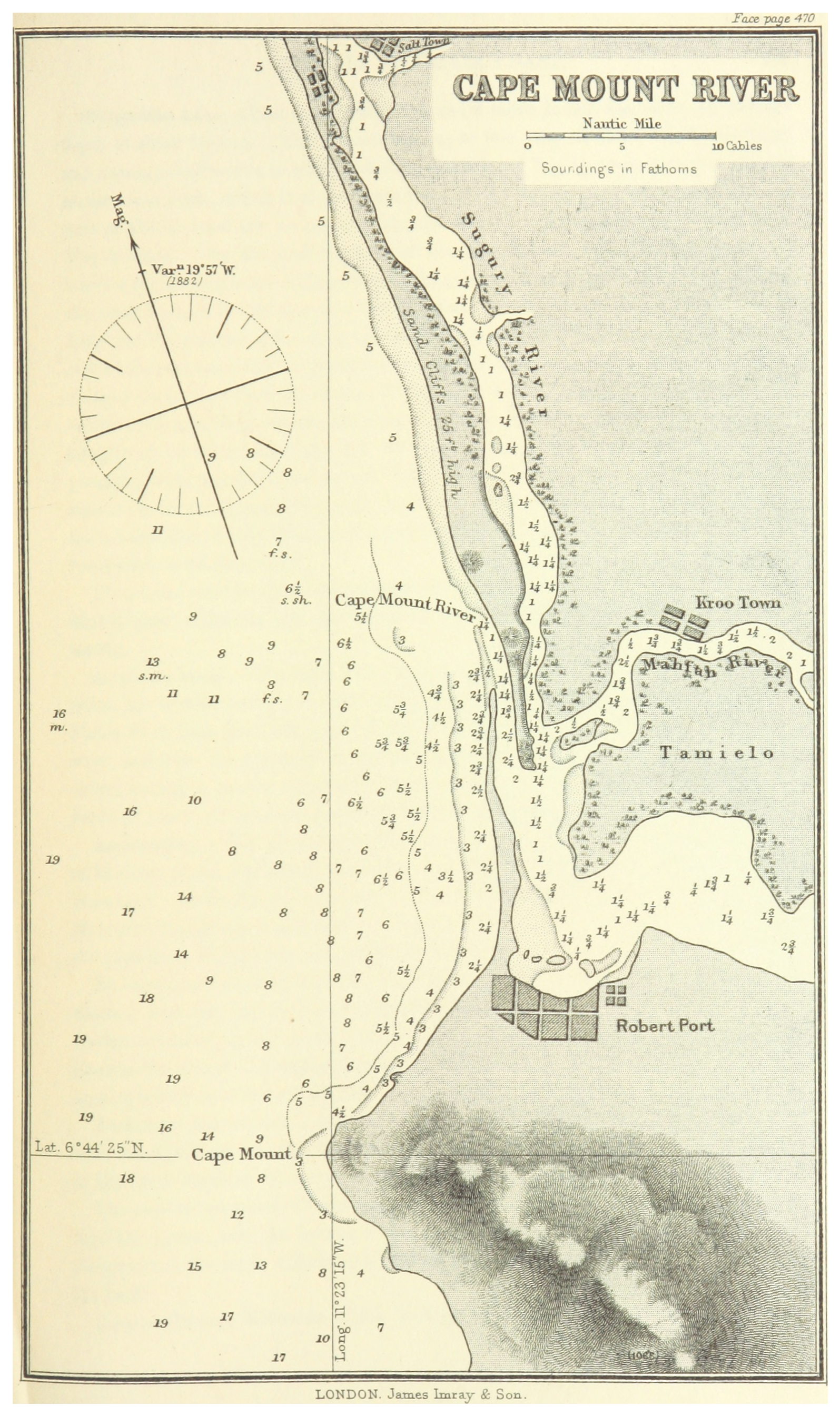
Map of Robertsport (1884)

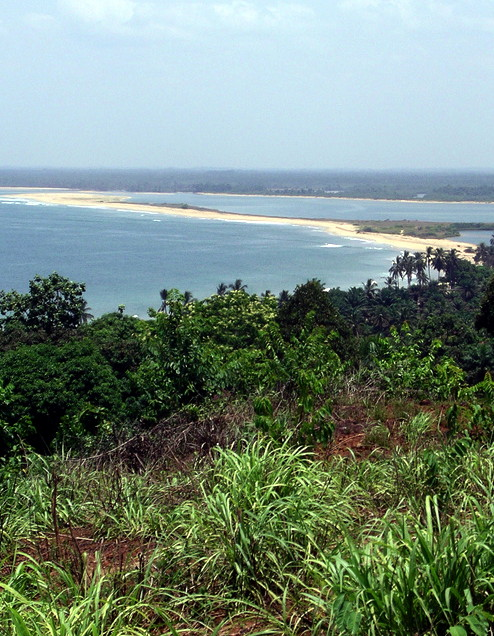
Cape Mount Bay

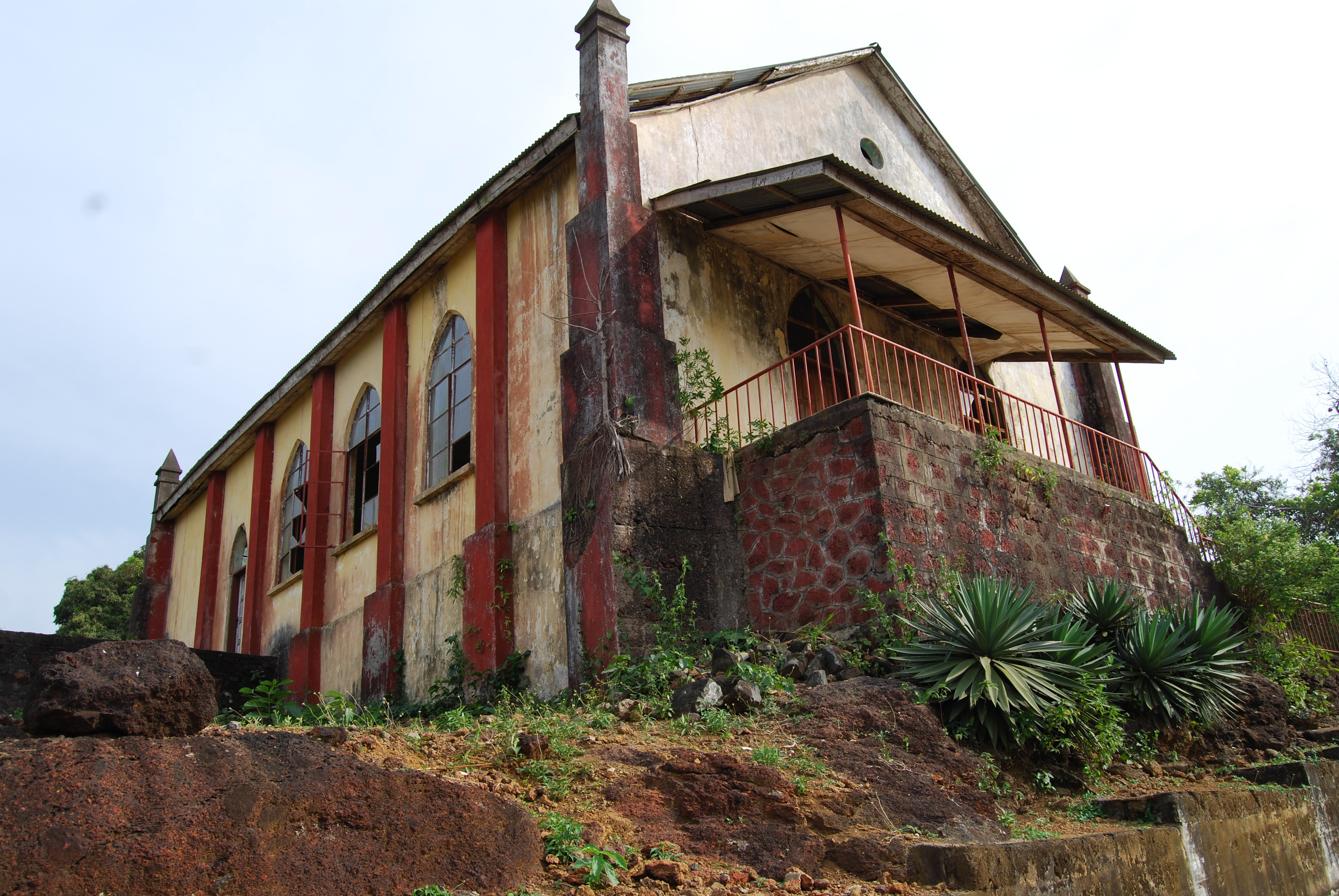
Mount Zion Baptist Church

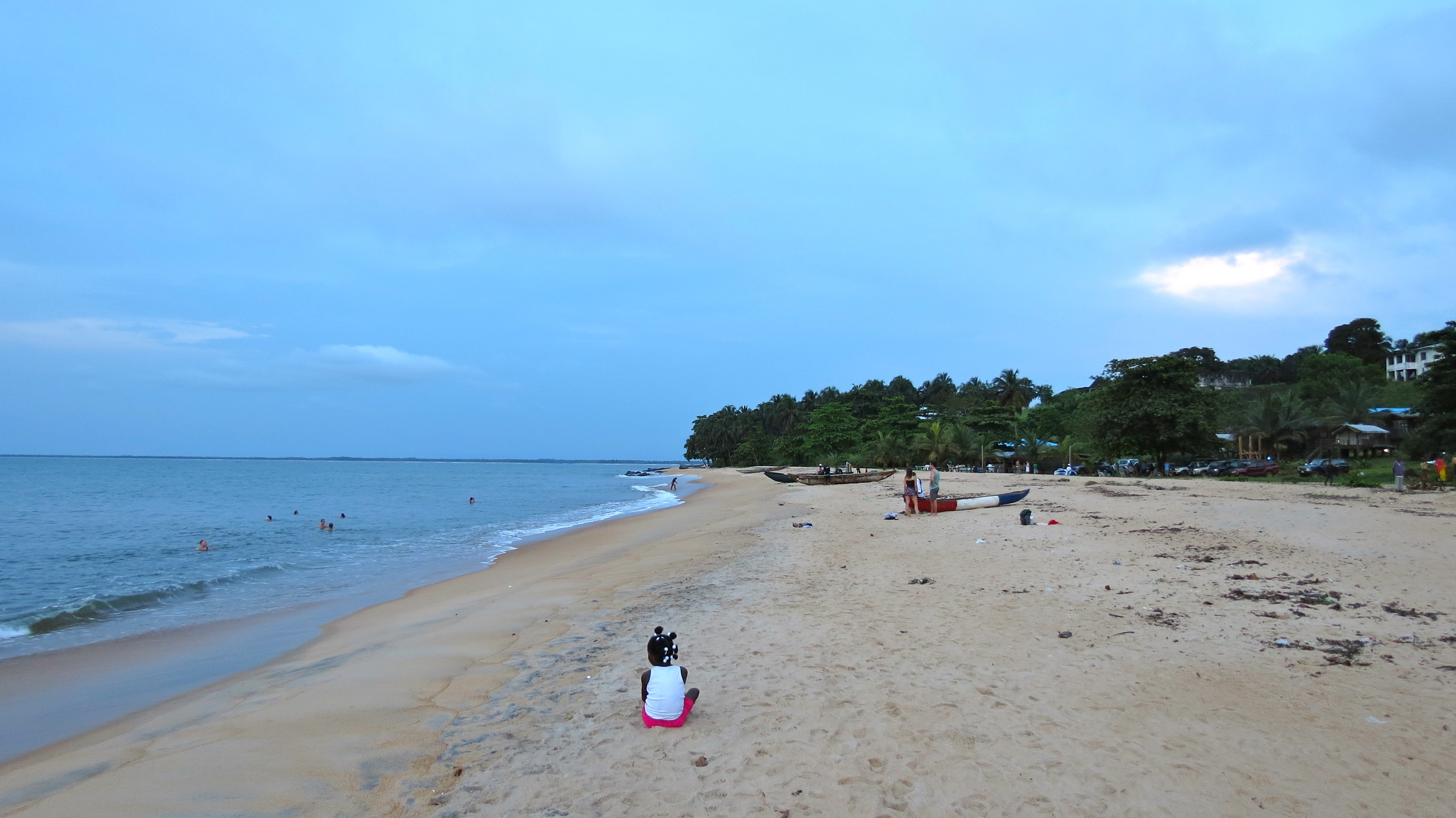
Beach

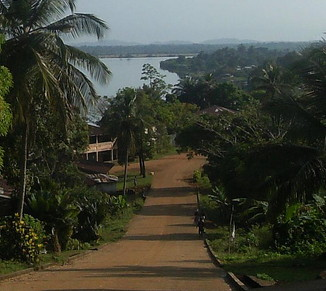
Hillside view

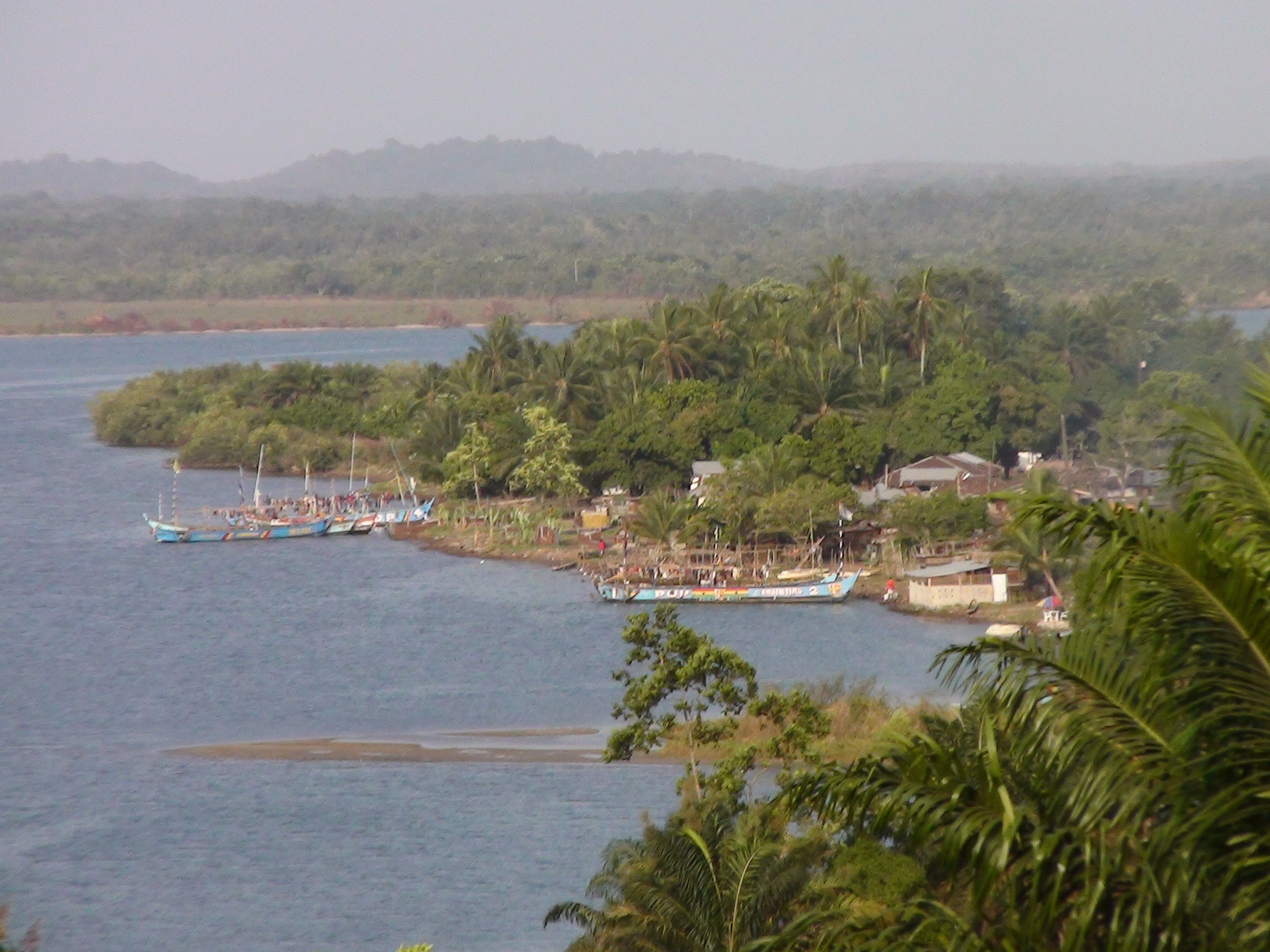
Port of Fanti Town

=== Climate ===
Robertsport has a tropical monsoon climate (Köppen Am) with a short dry season from January to March and a long, persistent wet season covering the rest of the year. At the peak of the wet season from July to September rainfall is exceedingly heavy, with monthly averages of around 35 inches or 900 millimetres.

Climate data for Robertsport
Month	Jan	Feb	Mar	Apr	May	Jun	Jul	Aug	Sep	Oct	Nov	Dec	Year
Mean daily maximum °F (°C)	88 (31)	89 (32)	90 (32)	89 (32)	89 (32)	85 (29)	80 (27)	80 (27)	82 (28)	85 (29)	87 (31)	87 (31)	86 (30)
Mean daily minimum °F (°C)	71 (22)	72 (22)	73 (23)	74 (23)	74 (23)	73 (23)	73 (23)	71 (22)	72 (22)	72 (22)	72 (22)	71 (22)	72 (22)
Average rainfall inches (mm)	1.5 (38)	0.2 (5.1)	0.7 (18)	7.1 (180)	10 (250)	19.1 (490)	31.6 (800)	36.5 (930)	36.5 (930)	14.6 (370)	4.5 (110)	3.3 (84)	165.6 (4,210)
Source: Weatherbase

== Demographics ==
As of the 2008 census, Robertsport has a population of 3,933. Of this, 1,994 were male and 1,939 female. Robertsport was founded in 1856 as a settlement for recently arrived African American immigrants. The Vai are the dominant indigenous ethnic group, but other groups are present as well, notably the Gola, Mende, Mandingo, Fante, Klao [Kru], and Bassa.

== Economy ==
Liberia is a war torn country. Despite looting, the town has remained structurally intact. The town's architecture includes now-decrepit, plantation-style houses reminiscent of the Southern United States - a historical influence on Liberia - which line wide avenues that lean against the hills on the town's edge.

Robertsport residents are mainly rice farmers and fishermen, with 30% of the population engaging in fishing.

== Notable residents ==
- Johann Büttikofer (1850-1927), Swiss zoologist
- Florence Chenoweth (1945-2023), politician and agriculture and food security specialist
- Amymusu Jones (c. 1948-2018), jurist and magistrate
- Varney Sherman (born 1953), politician
- Victoria Tolbert (1916–1997), Former First Lady of Liberia
