= William Kloefkorn =

American poet

William Charles "Bill" Kloefkorn (August 12, 1932 – May 19, 2011), was a Nebraska poet and educator based in Lincoln, Nebraska. He was the author of twelve collections of poetry, two short story collections, a collection of children's Christmas stories, and four memoirs. Kloefkorn was professor of English from 1962 to his retirement in 1997 to professor emeritus of English at Nebraska Wesleyan University.

Kloefkorn was born in Attica, Kansas and obtained bachelor's and master's degrees from Emporia State University in Emporia, Kansas, and did additional graduate work at the University of Kansas and the University of Nebraska–Lincoln. Prior to teaching at Nebraska Wesleyan, Kloefkorn taught at Wichita State University and at Ellinwood High School in Ellinwood, Kansas.

In 1982, Kloefkorn was appointed State Poet of Nebraska, a position roughly equivalent to Poet Laureate. (In 1921, the Nebraska Legislature permanently bestowed the title of Poet Laureate of Nebraska on John Neihardt, who died in 1973. A successor to this title has not been named.) Kloefkorn died in Lincoln, Nebraska. He was succeeded as State Poet by his student Twyla Hansen in 2013.

In addition to his literary honors, Kloefkorn boasted that he won first place in the 1978 Nebraska Hog-Calling Championship. An elementary school in Lincoln is named after Kloefkorn.

== Selected publications ==
Poetry

- Alvin Turner As Farmer (Windflower Press, 1972) - reissued by Logan House Press in 2005
- Uncertain the Final Run to Winter (Windflower Press, 1974)
- Loony (Issued as: APPLE: NO. 10/11, 1975)
- Not Such a Bad Place to Be (Copper Canyon Press, 1980)
- Platte Valley Homestead (Platte Valley Press, 1981)
- Collecting for the Wichita Beacon (Platte Valley Press, 1984); OCLC 13189843
- Drinking the Tin Cup Dry (White Pine Press, 1989)
- Where the Visible Sun Is (Spoon River Poetry Press, 1989)
- Going Out, Coming Back (White Pine Press, 1995)
- Welcome to Carlos (Spoon River Poetry Press, 2000)
- Loup River Psalter (Spoon River Poetry Press, 2001)
- Sergeant Patrick Gass, Chief Carpenter (Spoon River Poetry Press, 2002) Verse written by Kloefkorn in the voice of Sergeant Patrick Gass, chief carpenter on the Lewis and Clark Expedition based on research into the expedition and the journal kept by Sergeant Gass himself
- I Screwed A Pig and It Liked It (The Backwaters Press, 2007)
- Out of Attica (The Backwaters Press, 2008)
- Swallowing the Soap: New and Selected Poems (Bison Books: University of Nebraska Press, 2010)

Memoirs

- This Death by Drowning (University of Nebraska Press, 1997)
- Restoring the Burnt Child: A Primer (University of Nebraska Press, 2003)
- At Home on This Moveable Earth (University of Nebraska Press, 2006)
- Breathing in the Fullness of Time (University of Nebraska Press, 2009)

Fiction

- A Time to Sink Her Pretty Little Ship (Logan House Press, 1999)
- Shadowboxing and Other Stories (Logan House Press, 2003)
