= Jewel Rodgers =

American poet

- Born: Jewel Rodgers
- Occupation: Teaching artist
- Writing career
- Period: 1990s–present
- Genre: Poetry
- Website: jewelrodgers.com

Jewel Rodgers is an American spoken word poet who, as of 2025, serves as Nebraska State Poet. She is the first African American to fill the role. Rodgers lives in Omaha.

At the announcement of her selection in January 2025 as the state's official poet, Rodgers performed a spoken-word poem titled "Humble" at the Nebraska Capitol. Governor Jim Pillen selected Rodgers from among the nominees after hearing her recite poetry. Rodgers said she intends to use the role as poet laureate to encourage young people to read, to make poetry accessible to all Nebraskans, and to promote other Nebraska authors and artists.

Rogers appeared in the event "100 Years | 100 Women" at the Park Avenue Armory, an exhibition marking the anniversary of the Nineteenth Amendment to the United States Constitution.

She works as a teaching artist with the Nebraska Writers Collective. Rodgers runs a group that seeks to create community spaces on vacant lots in North Omaha. She attended the University of Nebraska–Lincoln and New York University. Her father is football player Johnny Rodgers.

== See also ==
- List of African-American U.S. state firsts
- Ashley M. Jones
- John Neihardt
