= Tewor District =

District of Liberia

Coordinates: 7.000°N 11.297°W

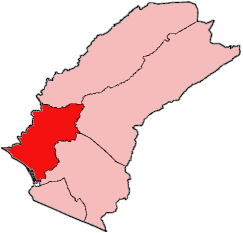
Location of Tewor District in Grand Cape Mount County

Tewor District is one of five districts located in Grand Cape Mount County, Liberia. As of the 2008 Census, it has a population of 27,460.

Tewor is located between the Atlantic Ocean, Lake Piso and the Mano River, on the boundary with Sierra Leone.

Inhabitants of this district are of the Vai tribe, but they predominantly speak both Vai and Mende.

The current Commissioner of Tewor District is Clarence D. Fahnbulleh, and the Paramount Chief is Hon. Moiba Kromah.

Tewor is the home of district of the following prominent Liberians:

- Ruth Sando Perry - Chairman of the Council of State (1996-1997)
- The late H. Boima Fahnbulleh, Sr. - Member of the Constitution Commission (1981-1984) and father of former National Security Advisor, Henry Boimah Fahnbulleh
- Her Honor Gladys Johnson - Associate Justice of the Supreme Court
