= Twyla Hansen =

American poet (born 1949)

Twyla M. Hansen (born 1949) is an American poet, who served as the Nebraska State Poet until 2018. She is the third Nebraskan and first woman to hold this position, to which she was appointed by Governor Dave Heineman in November 2013.

== Life ==
Hansen was raised near the town of Lyons in northeast Nebraska and currently lives in Lincoln. She holds a bachelor's degree in horticulture and a master's degree in agroecology from the University of Nebraska–Lincoln. While working as grounds manager and arboretum curator at Nebraska Wesleyan University, Hansen took classes from poet William Kloefkorn, who became one of her mentors. Hansen was appointed to replace Kloefkorn as Nebraska State Poet after his death in 2011.

== Awards ==
- 2004 Nebraska Book Award for Poetry (for Potato Soup)
- 2012 Nebraska Book Award - Nebraska Center for the Book (for Dirt Songs: A Plains Duet)

== Selected publications ==
=== Books ===
- How to Live in the Heartland. Flatwater Editions. 1992. ISBN 978-0963353504.
- In Our Very Bones. Slow Tempo Press. 1997. ISBN 978-0963555977.
- Sanctuary Near Salt Creek. Lone Willow Press. 2001.
- Potato Soup. The Backwaters Press. 2003. ISBN 978-0972618724.
- Prairie Suite: A Celebration. Spring Creek Prairie Audubon Center. 2006. Illustrated by Paul Johnsgard.
- Dirt Songs: A Plains Duet. The Backwaters Press. 2011. ISBN 978-1935218241. With Linda Hasselstrom.
- Rock • Tree • Bird. The Backwaters Press. 2017. ISBN 978-1935218456.

=== Anthologies ===
- Mark Vinz; Thom Tammaro, eds. (1993). Inheriting the Land: Contemporary Voices from the Midwest. University of Minnesota Press. ISBN 978-0816623037.
- Nancy Curtis; Gaydell Collier; Linda Hasselstrom, eds. (1997). Leaning Into the Wind: Women Write from the Heart of the West. Houghton Mifflin. ISBN 978-0395837382.
- Linda Hasselstrom; Nancy Curtis; Gaydell Collier, eds. (2001). Woven on the Wind: Women Write about Friendship in the Sagebrush West. Houghton Mifflin. ISBN 978-0395977088.
- Rural Voices: Literature From Rural Nebraska. Dirt Road Press. 2002. ISBN 978-0971903005.
- Sam Hamill, ed. (2003). Poets Against the War. Nation Books. ISBN 978-1560255390.
- David J. Wishart, ed. (2004). Encyclopedia of the Great Plains. University of Nebraska Press. ISBN 978-0803247871.
- Laura Madeline Wiseman, ed. (2013). Women Write Resistance: Poets Resist Gender Violence. Hyacinth Girl Press. ISBN 978-0615772783.
