= Liberian National County Meet =

Liberian football tournament

National County Sport Meets
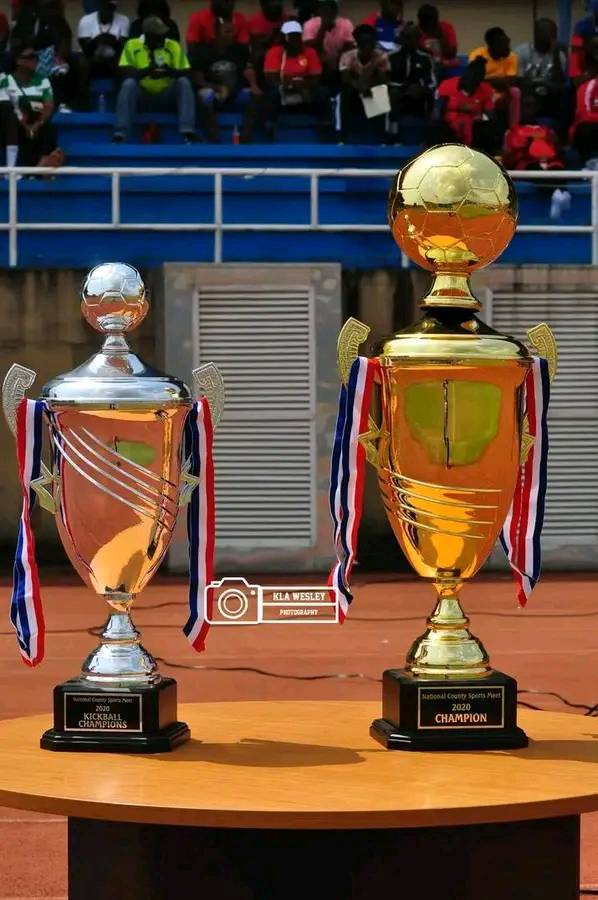
- Organiser(s): Ministry of Youth and Sport
- Founded: 1956; 70 years ago
- Region: Liberia
- Teams: 15 (2015–Present)
- Current champions: Nimba County
- Most championships: Nimba County (7 titles)

The Liberian National County Sports Meet is the top knockout county tournament of the Liberian football inaugurated in 1956. It is an annual sporting festival organised and hosted by the Ministry of Youth and Sports in collaboration with the Ministry of Internal Affairs. The event is primarily a platform intended to forge national unity and reconciliation in Liberia.

The National County Sport Meet is the most watched football tournament across Liberia, with over 1.5 million football fans tuning in to listen over Radio, watching live from different Liberian online football sources, and also visiting the various stadiums in which the games can be played.

== Competition format ==
Beginning in December sometimes January, the competition proceeds with a group stage of 15 teams, divided into four groups, with the first three groups carrying four teams and the last group carrying three. Each team plays every member of its group, and the team with the highest point and the runners-up in each group will then proceed to the next round while the other team will be eliminated.

- Quarterfinals (New Format): Beginning from the 2025/2026 tournament, the eight quarterfinalist teams are divided into two groups and play in a round-robin format, rather than the traditional single-game knockout, to increase competition opportunities. These matches are centralized in the capital, Monrovia, specifically at the Samuel Kanyon Doe (SKD) Sports Complex.
- Knockout Stage (Semifinals & Finals): The top teams from the quarterfinal groups advance to the semifinals, which are single-elimination matches. The winners proceed to the grand finale.

== List of winners ==
- 1956 : Maryland County
- 1969 : Grand Cape Mount County
- 1974 : Grand Kru County
- 1977 : Grand Kru County
- 1978 : Nimba County
- 1979 : Nimba County
- 1985 : Grand Kru County
- 1987: Grand Kru County
- 1989: Grand Gedeh County
- 1990: Grand Bassa County
- 2004 : Gbarpolu County
- 2007 : Rivercess County
- 2008 : Bong County
- 2009 : Bomi County
- 2010 : Nimba County
- 2011 : Nimba County
- 2012 : Margibi County
- 2013 : Grand Cape Mount County
- 2014: Grand Bassa County
- 2015: N/A (*was cancelled due to the Ebola epidemic)
- 2016: Grand Bassa County
- 2017: Maryland County
- 2018 : Montserrado County
- 2019 : Bomi County
- 2020 : Grand Kru County
- 2021 : Lofa County
- 2022 : Nimba County
- 2023 : Nimba County
- 2024 : River Gee County
- 2025 : Lofa County
- 2026: Nimba County

Previous Finals results
seasons	winners	Scores	Runners-up
1956	Maryland County	0–0 (Maryland won on coin toss)	Montserrado County
1969	Grand Cape Mount County	3–1	Montserrado County
1974	Grand Kru County	-	-
1977	Grand Kru County	-	-
1978	Nimba County	-	-
1979	Nimba County	-	-
1985	Grand Kru County	2–0	Grand Bassa County
1987	Grand Kru County	4–1	Margibi County
1989	Grand Gedeh County	(Grand Gedeh won on coin toss)	Grand Bassa County
1990	Grand Bassa County	1–0	Nimba County
2004	Gbarpolu County	2–1	Lofa County
2007	Rivercess County	2–0	Grand Gedeh County
2008	Bong County	4–3	Rivercess County
2009	Bomi County	5–2	River Gee County
2010	Nimba County	2–0	Grand Gedeh County
2011	Nimba County	1–0	Margibi County
2012	Margibi County	2–0	Nimba County
2013	Grand Cape Mount County	1–1 (3–1 pen.)	Montserrado County
2014	Grand Bassa County	2–1	Nimba County
2015	cancelled due to the Ebola virus epidemic in Liberia		
2016	Grand Bassa County	1–1 (3–1 pen.)	Montserrado County
2017	Montserrado County	1–1 (3–1 pen.)	Maryland County
2018	Montserrado County	2–0	Bong County
2019	Bomi County	1–1 (4–3 pen.)	Margibi County
2020	Grand Kru County	(Nimba County walked off the pitch)	Nimba County
2021	Lofa County	3–1	Montserrado County
2022	Nimba County	2–1	Gbarpolu County
2023	Nimba County	3–2	Lofa County
2024	River Gee County	2–2 (4–1 pen.)	Lofa County
2025	Lofa County	2–1	Grand Gedeh County
2026	Nimba County	2-0	Grand Kru County

Highest Carrier
	Teams	Titles	Runner ups
1	Nimba County	7	4
2	Grand Kru County	5	1
3	Grand Bassa County	3	2
4	Grand Cape Mount County	2	0
5	Bomi County	2	0
6	Montserrado County	2	5
7	Lofa County	2	3
8	Maryland County	1	1
9	Grand Gedeh County	1	3
10	Gbarpolu County	1	1
11	Rivercess County	1	1
12	Bong County	1	1
13	Margibi County	1	3
14	River Gee County	1	1

== History ==
In 1970, the Sasstown Territory, which is now part of Grand Kru County, emerged victorious in the county meet, while the Kru Coast Territory claimed the title in 1974. Grand Kru County has won the county meet a total of four times. Notable players from Sasstown during that period included Patrick Arthur, Anthony Wesseh, Tarpeh Roberts, Sylvester Red’ Weah, Michael Tarplah, Anthony Sayon Nagbe, Experience Tony, and Telemu.

== Records and Statistics ==
Championship Records

- Most Titles: Nimba County holds the record for the most championships with seventitles (1978, 1979, 2010, 2011, 2022, 2023, 2026).
- Back-to-Back Wins: Nimba County is the only team to have won consecutive titles on three occasions.
- Undefeated finals: Grand Kru County County holds the unique distinction of never having lost a grand final appearance, with five championship wins.
- Most Finals Appearances: Nimba County has appeared in the most grand finals, with 11 appearances
- Most Finals Lost: Montserrado County has lost the most finals, with five defeats.
- First Winner: Maryland County was the first county to win the tournament in 1956, defeating Montserrado County on a coin toss.
- Never Won: Sinoe County is the only county that has yet to win the championship.

Player and tournament records

- Highest Scoring Final: The 2009 final saw the most goals scored when Bomi County defeated River Gee County 5–2, for a total of 7 goals.
- Scored in Three Finals: James Tarpeh holds the unique record of being the first player to score in three different finals of the tournament.
