= Tienie =

Village in Grand Cape Mount County, Liberia

- Location in Liberia
- Coordinates: 6°56′34″N 11°20′16″W
- Country: Liberia
- County: Grand Cape Mount County

Tienie is a town in Grand Cape Mount County, Liberia.
