= Matt Mason (poet) =

American poet (born 1968)

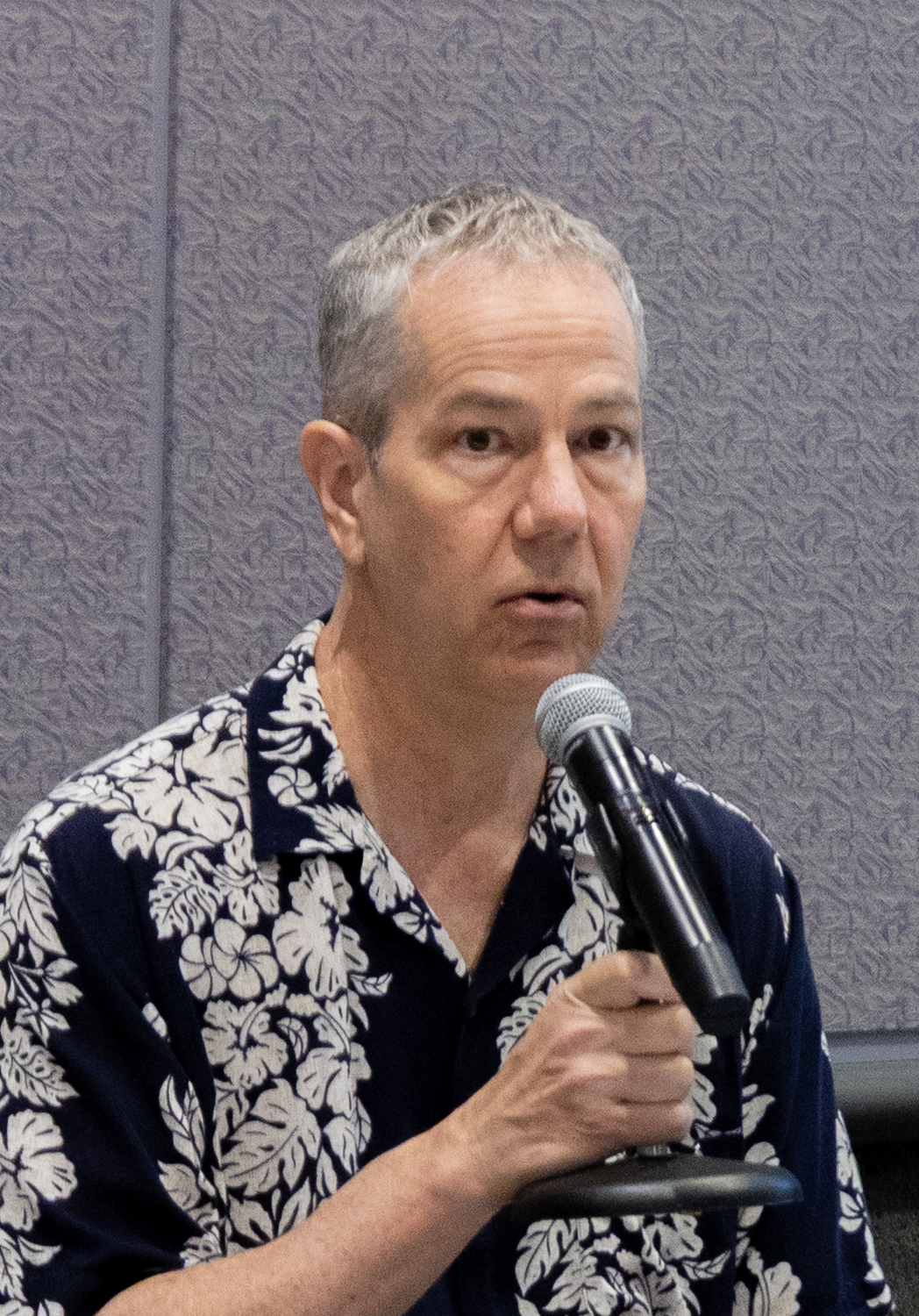
Mason in 2025

Matt Mason (born 1968) is an American poet based in Omaha, Nebraska. From 2019 to 2024, he served as Nebraska State Poet, serving until the end of 2024. He has published five full-length works of poetry as well as eight chapbooks and two poetry anthologies. Mason has written about fatherhood, Disneyland, Eighties Rock, relationships, religion and the Bible, and themes of Midwest and Great Plains life. Mason's early work gave him a reputation as a humorous poet, but he has written comedy, drama, and tragedy.

== Career ==
Mason's first book Things We Don't Know We Don't Know was published in 2006 by the Backwaters Press (an imprint of University of Nebraska Press) and won the 2007 Nebraska Book Award for both Poetry and Cover Design. The anthology Slamma Lamma Ding Dong (2005), which Mason co-edited, was made available through iuniverse and won the 2006 Nebraska Book Award for Best Anthology. Six of his eight chapbooks have been published through his own small press, Morpo Press.

Mason currently works as a poet and speaker, traveling to schools, libraries and more for readings, talks, corporate trainings and writing workshops. He served as Executive Director of the Nebraska Writers Collective from 2009-2022 where he was festival coordinator for the Louder Than a Bomb: Great Plains Youth Poetry Festival. He served as past board president for the Nebraska Center for the Book, and was a consultant for the Nebraska Arts Council for Nebraska’s Poetry Out Loud program (an NEA/Poetry Foundation program) until 2016. He has served on the board of directors for the Nebraska Literary Heritage Association, the Omaha Entertainment and Arts Awards, Friends of the Omaha Public Library, and the Medusa Project. In October, 2015, Mason served as a representative for the U.S. State Department in Romania teaching Poetry slam to high schools students in various cities. Mason has also been in charge of State Department programs in Belarus (2008), Nepal (2010), and Botswana (2014).

Mason is married to the poet Sarah McKinstry-Brown (Sarah Mason). They have two daughters.

== Bibliography ==
=== Books ===
- Things We Don't Know We Don't Know, Backwaters Press, 2006 ISBN 0-9765231-8-3
- The Baby That Ate Cincinnati, Stephen F. Austin University Press, 2013 ISBN 978-1936205943
- I Have a Poem the Size of the Moon, Stephen F. Austin University Press, 2020 ISBN 978-1622889020
- At the Corner of Fantasy and Main: Disneyland, Midlife and Churros, The Old Mill Press, 2022 ISBN 978-1735769134
- Rock Stars, Button Poetry, 2023 ISBN 978-1638340652

=== Chapbooks ===
- Old Froggo's Book of Practical Cows, Morpo Press, 1997.
- Desire for More Cows, Morpo Press, 1998.
- A Blessing and A Curse, Morpo Press, 2000.
- A Still, Small Voice, Morpo Press, 2001.
- Coffee and Astronomy and Other Poems, Morpo Press, 2001.
- Mistranslating Neruda, New Michigan Press, 2002.
- Red, White, Blue, Morpo Press, 2003.
- When the Bough Breaks, Lone Willow Press, 2005.

=== Poems ===
Title	Year	First published	Reprinted/collected in
Notes for my daughter against chasing storms	2011	Mason, Matt (May 2011). "Notes for my daughter against chasing storms". Nebraska Poets Calendar.	Henderson, Bill, ed. (2013). The Pushcart Prize XXXVII : best of the small presses 2013. Pushcart Press. pp. 108–109.
The Story of Ferdinand the Bull	2013	The Baby that Ate Cincinnati, Matt Mason (Stephen F. Austin University Press)	PoetryFoundation.org, https://www.poetryfoundation.org/poems/56617/the-story-of-ferdinand-the-bull
The Start	2021	The New York Times, January 10, 2021; https://www.nytimes.com/2021/01/10/us/capitol-poem-matt-mason-start.html	Poets.org, https://poets.org/poem/start
At The Corner of New Orleans and Frontier - At Disneyland	2022	At the Corner of Fantasy and Main: Disneyland, Midlife and Churros by Matt Mason (The Old Mill Press)	Poets.org, https://poets.org/poem/corner-new-orleans-and-frontier-disneyland
