= Yolanda Wisher =

American poet (born 1976)

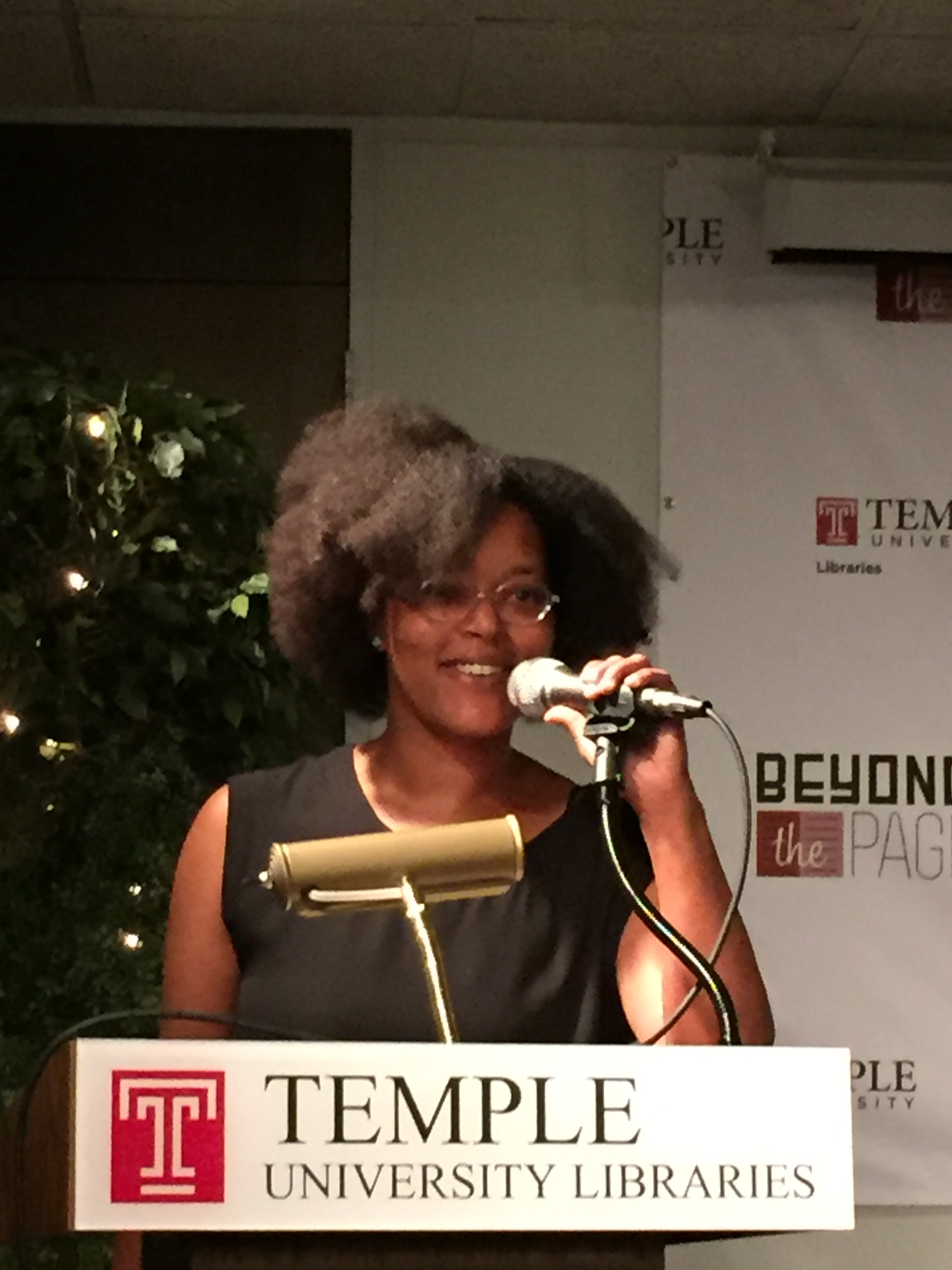
- Born: 1976 (age 49–50); Philadelphia, Pennsylvania, US
- Education: Lafayette College; Temple University
- Occupations: Poet, spoken-word artist
- Writing career
- Genre: Poetry
- Notable work: Monk Eats an Afro
- Website: yolandawisher.com

Yolanda Wisher (born 1976) is an American poet, educator and spoken-word artist who focuses on the experience of being African-American. She is a graduate of Temple University and was selected as the third Poet Laureate of Philadelphia in 2016.

== Education and early life ==
Yolanda Wisher was born in Philadelphia and grew up in North Wales, Pennsylvania. Wisher graduated from North Penn High School in 1994. She studied English and Black Studies, obtaining her BA degree in English and Black Studies from Lafayette College. She received her MA in creative writing from Temple University in 2000.

== Career ==
Wisher taught English for various years at the Germantown Friends School. She was the founder and director of the Germantown Poetry Festival, a local poetry event in the Germantown neighborhood of Philadelphia from 2006 to 2010. From 2010 to 2015, she served as the Director of Art Education for the City of Philadelphia Mural Arts Program.

External videos
- “Yolanda Wisher Named Philly's New Poet Laureate", February 5, 2016, 6ABC News
- "Yolanda Wisher Performs "Gangsta Birth" @ Re-Imagining Maplewood Mall", May 30, 2015, Ronald Dove
- "Imagining Germantown with Cultural Agent Yolanda Wisher", June 26, 2014, U.S. Department of Arts and Culture

As of 2015, Wisher is a Founding Cultural Agent for the U.S. Department of Arts and Culture. In 2016, she was chosen as the third poet laureate of Philadelphia, following Sonia Sanchez (2012–13) and Frank Sherlock (2014–15), respectively, and is a 2016 writer-in-residence at the Hedgebrook residency program for women writers.

== Personal life ==
Wisher lives in Germantown with her partner Mark Palacio and their son Thelonius. She frequently plays music with her band "Yolanda Wisher and the Quick Fixx".

== Works by Wisher ==
Books of poetry

- 2014: Monk Eats an Afro, ISBN 9781934909423, OCLC 8795289

Contributor to anthologies

- 2007: The Ringing Ear: Black Poets Lean South, ISBN 9780820329253 OCLC 239032215
- 2009: A Best of Fence: The First Nine Years, ISBN 9781934200049, OCLC 318878255
- 2013: Gathering Ground: a Reader Celebrating Cave Canem's First Decade, ISBN 9780472099245, OCLC 62133808
- 2013: Peace is a Haiku Song (ed. with Sonia Sanchez), OCLC 877155740

Wisher has also published in periodicals including The American Poetry Review, Black Arts Quarterly, Chain, Drumvoices Revue, Fence, Hanging Loose, Melus, Meridians Feminism, Race, Transnationalism, nocturnes (re)view of the literary arts, Open Letter, Ploughshares, and POeP!.

== Awards and honors ==
Wisher was chosen as the poet laureate of Montgomery County, Pennsylvania, in 1999, and later selected as the third poet laureate of Philadelphia in 2016, by mayor-elect Jim Kenney.

She was a fellow of the Cave Canem Foundation from 1999 to 2000 and has published in their anthology Gathering Ground (2013).

She received a Leeway Art and Change grant in 2008, and was the recipient of a Pew Center for Arts and Heritage grant for 2015.
