= Cape Mount Nature Conservation Unit =

Protected area in Liberia

- IUCN category II (national park)
- Interactive map of Cape Mount Nature Conservation Unit
- Location: Grand Cape Mount County, Liberia
- Nearest city: Jimija
- Coordinates: 6°48′24″N 11°22′24″W
- Area: 55,400 hectares (137,000 acres)
- Established: 1977

The Cape Mount Nature Conservation Unit is found in Liberia. It was established in 1977. This site is 554 km^{2}.

It belongs to the IUCN category IV.
