= Joseph Bartuah =

Liberian journalist

Joe Bartuah is a Liberian journalist. He is a former editor of The News, a Monrovia-based daily newspaper. He currently serves as Media Specialist for Consolidated Media, Inc., a non-profit media advocacy organization based in Boston, Massachusetts.

== Arrest ==
Bartuah was arrested along with fellow journalists Abdullah Dukuly, Jerome Dalieh and Bobby Tapson on 21 February 2001, after The News reported the government of Charles Taylor paid 50,000 United States dollars to fix non-existent helicopters rather than pay civil servants.

== Biography ==
Bartuah hails from Kaipa, Yarwin-Mehnsonon District, Nimba County in Liberia. He previously worked with the Information Ministry in Liberia, where he served as Assistant Editor-in-Chief prior to the eruption of the civil war in 1989; he later became Director of Media Relations at the same ministry and Editor-in-Chief of the Liberia Today newspaper between 1992 and December 1994. Perhaps his most successful job as a journalist was as Editor of The NEWS newspaper between 1995 and 2001, helping to raise the paper's profile and circulation during the turbulent years of the civil upheaval. It was during this time that he debuted his "New Thinking" column, an incisively analytical commentary on the prevailing socio-economic and political malaise of the time. He has been the brain behind several political speeches in the 1997 election.
