= Nebraska State Poet =

Poet Laureate of Nebraska
- Incumbent; Jewel Rodgers since 2025
- Type: Poet Laureate
- Formation: 1921
- First holder: John G. Neihardt

The titles Nebraska Poet Laureate and Nebraska State Poet are applied by the government of Nebraska to an official state poet.

John G. Neihardt was designated Nebraska poet laureate by the Nebraska Legislature in 1921. In 1927 the legislature extended his title to "Nebraska Poet Laureate in Perpetuity." Neihardt remains officially the state's only poet laureate today. Subsequent official poets were therefore given a new title, Nebraska State Poet.

As the first state poet, William Kloefkorn started a tradition of promoting literature and literacy in the state using his official title. Poets are nominated by a committee of arts and humanities organizations in the state, which then forwards a list of finalists to the governor of Nebraska for the final selection. The most recent is Jewel Rodgers, the youngest person and first African-American to hold the title.

== List of poets ==
- John G. Neihardt (1921-1973)
- William Kloefkorn (1982-2011)
- Twyla M. Hansen (2013-2019)
- Matt Mason (2019-2025)
- Jewel Rodgers (current)

== See also ==
- Poet laureate
- List of U.S. state poets laureate
- United States Poet Laureate
