= Poet Laureate of Philadelphia =

Poet Laureate of Philadelphia is a civic position in the City of Philadelphia. The Poet Laureate has been described as an "Ambassador of Poetry". The holder of the position is expected to actively promote literacy and encourage expression in the city. As part of their position, they participate in service work, workshops and readings. One of their commitments is to mentor the youth poet laureate of Philadelphia.

The position was created by the City of Philadelphia during the city administration of Mayor Michael Nutter. It was originally managed by the city's Office of Arts, Culture and the Creative Economy. As of 2017, administration of the program was transferred to the Free Library of Philadelphia. The current poet laureate governing committee consists of librarians, educators, non-profit professionals, and poets, including Philadelphia poets laureate emeritus.

Poetry makes us remember the best of ourselves and others... it keeps us constantly confronting the most important question of this twenty-first century: what does it mean to be human?

— Sonia Sanchez, 2014

== Poets laureate ==
The position of Poet Laureate of Philadelphia has a two-year duration, and is generally announced in January.

- 2012-2013 - Sonia Sanchez
- 2014-2015 - Frank Sherlock
- 2016-2017 - Yolanda Wisher
- 2018-2019 - Roque Salas Rivera
- 2020-2021 - Trapeta Mayson
- 2022-2023 - Airea D. Matthews
- 2024-2025 - Kai Davis
- 2026-2027 - Raina J. León

== Youth poets laureate ==
The position of Youth Poet Laureate of Philadelphia has a one-year duration, corresponding roughly to the school year. to qualify, poets must be a resident of Philadelphia enrolled in high school or a homeschool equivalent for the following school year. Applications often open in May or June, and the winning poet is announced in the fall. The Youth Poet Laureate receives mentoring from the Philadelphia Poet Laureate and is encouraged to develop a "signature project that engages the public" during their year.

- 2013-2014 - Siduri Beckman
- 2014-2015 - Soledad Alfaro-Allah
- 2015-2016 - David Jones
- 2016-2017 - Otter Jung-Allen
- 2017-2018 - Husnaa Hashim
- 2018-2019 - Wes Matthews
- 2019-2020 - Mia Concepcion
- 2020-2021 - Cydney Brown
- 2021-2022 - Andre'a Rhoads
- 2022-2023 - Telicia Darius
- 2023-2024 - Oyewumi Oyeniyi
- 2024-2025 - Malaya Ulan
- 2025-2026 - Rashawn Dorsey

Two youths poet laureate of Philadelphia have placed as finalists in the annual National Youth Poet Laureate competition administered by Urban Word, claiming the title of Northeast Regional Youth Poet Laureate. The first was Cydney Brown in 2023, and the second was Malaya Ulan in 2026.
