= Gola Konneh District =

Coordinates: 7.194°N 10.87°W

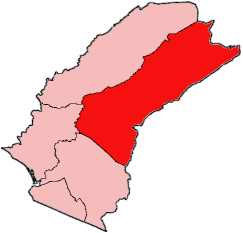
Location of Gola Konneh District in Grand Cape Mount County

Gola Konneh District is one of five districts located in Grand Cape Mount County, Liberia. As of the 2008 Census, it has a population of 23,518.
