= Frank Sherlock =

American poet

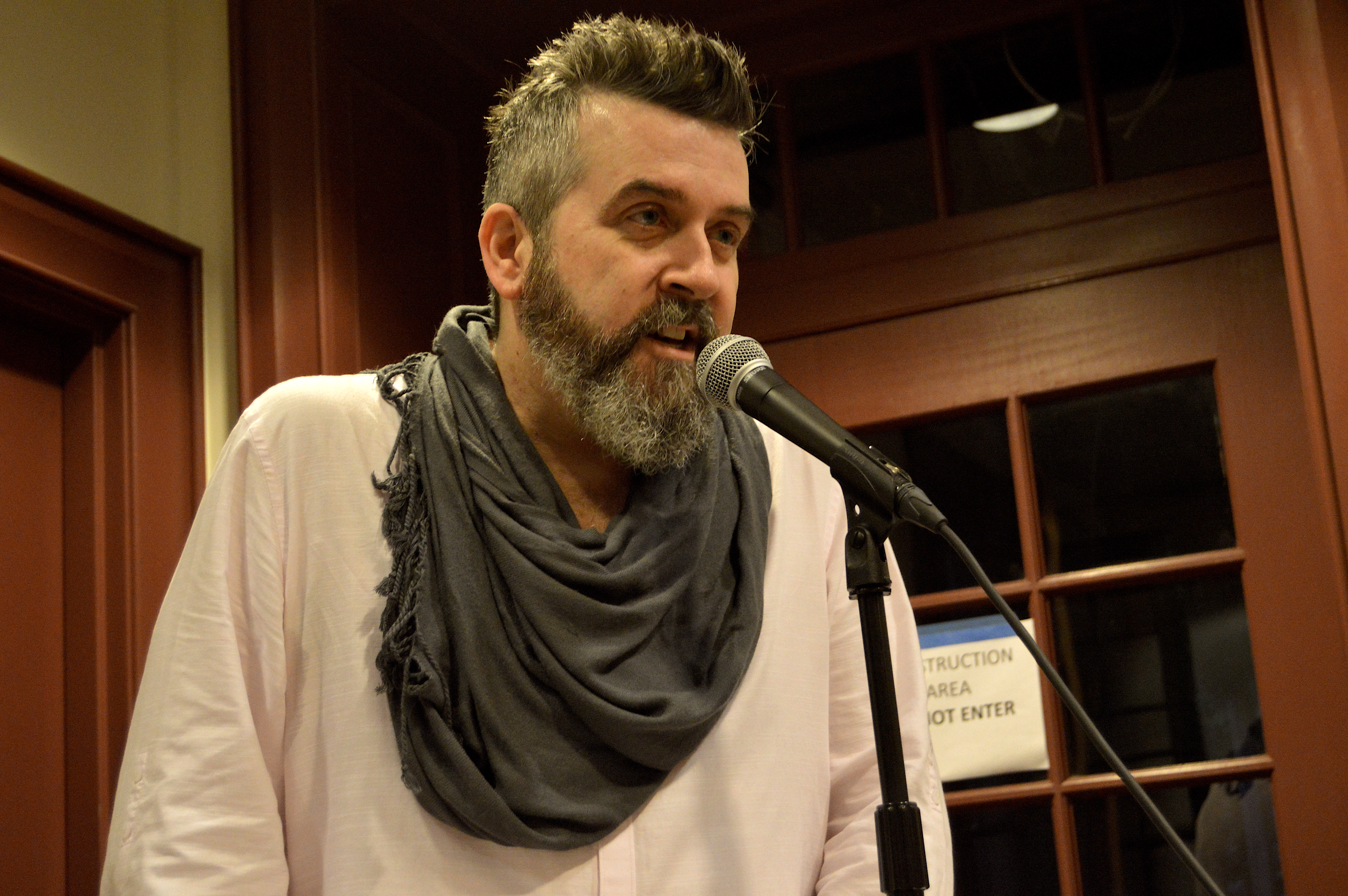
- Sherlock at Kelly Writers House, University of Pennsylvania, 2018
- Occupation: Poet
- Writing career
- Genre: Poetry

Frank Sherlock is an American poet, and second Poet Laureate of Philadelphia. He was a 2013 Pew Fellow in the Arts.

== Life ==
Frank Sherlock was the 2014–15 Poet Laureate of Philadelphia, and a 2013 Pew Fellow in the Arts for Literature. His most recent collection of poems is Space Between These Lines Not Dedicated (Ixnay Press, 2014). Sherlock approaches the work of a poet as conduit, and views writing poems as "collaborations of encounter". His projects are often collaborative.

The City Real and Imagined (Factory School, 2010) was written with the poet C. A. Conrad as a re-visioning of public spaces in what they refer to as "the City of Otherly Love." The two embarked on self-guided psycho-geographical wanders through Philadelphia, each beginning at LOVE Park.

Sherlock's time in New Orleans in 2006 resulted in a collaboration with poet Brett Evans, entitled Ready-To-Eat Individual (Lavender Ink, 2008). In an interview with Katy Henriksen for Oxford American: New Orleans & the Gulf Coast Issue, 2008: "The cases of DIY rebirth were everywhere around us, and it was a secret that had stayed within the region’s limits. Also, the effects of a city (with virtually no public services) trying to deal with a shared psychic wound of post-traumatic stress, its effect on the kids of New Orleans shuffled across town into schools with more security guards than teachers, the spike in street crime (partly as a result of these things) and other issues of displacement are largely untold stories in the national conversation. But there is also the light and dark magic of the city that cannot be explained in a straight-ahead journalist pursuit. Brett and I decided we could best talk about the state of the city post- [Hurricane] Katrina through the medium of poetry."

"I approach poetry as a cartographer," said Sherlock; "... mapping and remapping your surroundings according to your personal memory and associations and histories that you've heard." His project as Poet Laureate, "Write Your Block", gives Philadelphians the opportunity to explore their neighborhoods via poetry. Originally a project with the city's Office of Arts, Culture and the Creative Economy, Write Your Block lives on at The Philadelphia Citizen, so people citywide can use poetry to map the personal landmarks, histories, traditions and experiences that help identify their communities.

In 2019, the literary community learned of a time in the late 1980s where he was with a white nationalism-oriented skinhead punk group. His politics turned Left after he entered Temple University. He considers the white nationalist period of his life "a point of great shame for me" and the discovery of it led to debate.

== Works ==
Books

- Space Between These Lines Not Dedicated, ixnay press (2014) OCLC 887856523
- The City Real & Imagined (w/ CAConrad), Factory School: Heretical Texts v.5 (2010)
- Over Here, Factory School: Heretical Texts v.4 (2009)
- Ready-to-Eat Individual (w/ Brett Evans), Lavender Ink (2008) OCLC 1055273795

Chapbooks

- Neighbor Ballads, Albion Books (2013)
- Very Different Animals, Fact-Simile Press (2012)
- Don't Forget Me in the Dimension You Choose to Live, Splitleaves Press (2010)
- Feast Day Gone & Coming, Cy Gist Press (2010)
- Over Here, Katalanche Press (2008)
- Daybook of Perversities & Main Events, Cy Gist Press (2007)
- Quatro, Dusie Press (2007)
- Wounds in an Imaginary Nature Show, Night Flag Books (2007)
- Spring Diet of Flowers at Night, Mooncalf Press (2006)
- ISO, Furniture Press (2004)
- End/Begin w/ Chants (w/ CAConrad) Mooncalf Press (2001)
- Thirteen, Ixnay Press (1998)

Anthologies

- BOOG Philly Reader, BOOG Books (2012)
- Journeys South, City of Philadelphia Mural Arts Program (2011)
- OWS Anthology, People's Library (2011)
- Elective Affinities, CSR Cooperative (2010)
- Sturm and Drang: New Orleans Anthology, Big Bridge/ Trembling Pillow Press (2009)
- Landscapes of Dissent: Guerrilla Poetry & Public Space, Palm Press (2008)

Public Works/Installations

- Refuse Reuse: Language for the Common Landfill, Crane Arts Icebox, Philadelphia, PA (2012)
- Kensington Riots Project, Philadelphia, PA (2012)
- Neighbor Ballads, City of Philadelphia, PA Mural Arts Program. South Philadelphia, PA (2011)
- The B. Franklin Basement Tapes (w/ CAConrad), Nexus Foundation for Today's Art. Philadelphia, PA (2005)
