= Buffalo Readings =

Poetry reading series and group

Buffalo Readings is a poetry reading series and group. There have been hundreds of Buffalo Readings held since 2002. Members of the Buffalo Readings refer to themselves as "Buffalo" or "Buffalo Poets" and encourage listeners to shout out "moose" in addition to applauding at a Buffalo Reading. They do not hold poetry slams, and they have cited their dislike of slams as a factor in the formation of the group. Members of the Buffalo Poets were the featured bloggers on the Oxford University Press website for National Poetry Month.

== History ==
The group was founded in New York City in 2001 by the original three Buffalo poets: David Acevedo, Roger Kenny, and Anthony Morena. All three were friends from high school, and had been collaborating on the independent "Ripped Magazine" Issue 4. During this time Roger was renting a room in a Victorian style house in Jersey City, which became the creative nexus for the early Buffalo Poets. The first official Buffalo Readings was held on February 21, 2002 at Fat Cat Jazz and Billiards on Christopher St. in Manhattan's West Village. The show included performances by several poets, a live DJ, musical performance, and video performances, including an anaglyph video of poet Kurtis Darby reading. Red/Blue 3D glasses were distributed with admission. After the show, on the trip back to the Jersey City house, the poets gave out 3D glasses to commuters on one car of the Path train. The entire car was full of people wearing 3D glasses, even a police officer partook.

Soon after the initial reading, with Anthony no longer part of the group, but with the new member Noah Levin in tow, the Buffalo met the revolutionary activist Rafael Bueno, who was running the squat turned community center "Casa Del Sol: Future City" in the Bronx. This led to a successful 3 year reading series held every third Friday at Casa Del Sol, with Bueno joining as a regular member of the Buffalo. Although the early readings at Casa were held in pitch dark, with no electricity, and the only heat from a wood-burning stove, by the pinnacle of the readings the Buffalo were attracting a full house of fans interested in the free spirit of the readings. The readings continued their successful run until Casa Del Sol was shut down by the police on November 20, 2004.

Prior to Casa Del Sol's closing, the Buffalo Readings expanded to the West Coast via David Acevedo who took the Buffalo Readings first to Tacoma and Seattle, then Portland. In Portland the series gained some momentum, attracting many new artists into the Buffalo fold. While the expansion to the West Coast was a success; post-Casa Del Sol's closing the East Coast Buffalo continued to hold events. Between the East & West Coast groups (including many members traveling between both coasts), the Buffalo found themselves featured on KBOO FM's "Talking Earth" several times, headlining gigs at Big Sur, one member (David Acevedo) published in the book Heal (Between the Pages of These Folks We Seek a Panacea), and the Buffalo as a whole found themselves as the featured house poets on the Oxford University Press Blog during National Poetry Month and also throughout the summer of 2007.

Currently the Buffalo find themselves inactive.

Throughout the history of the Buffalo, they have attracted many members on throughout the US which currently include: King Otho, Noah Levin, David Acevedo, Kevin Callahan, James Honzik, Michael “Molotov” Franklin, Shakuhachi Jon, the jazz band Flip, Brian Kenny and the activist Rafael Bueno. The Buffalo's aim throughout the years has stayed the same, to inspire other artists to shake all structures, inspired towards an artistic and creative revolution.
