= Abdullah Dukuly =

Liberian journalist and news editor

Abdullah Dukuly (also known as Abdulai Dukuly and Abdoulaye W. Dukule) is a Liberian journalist and news editor, formerly of The News, a Monrovia-based daily publication.

== Arrest ==
Dukuly was arrested along with fellow editors Joseph Bartuah, Jerome Dalieh, and journalist Bobby Tapson on 21 February 2001 after The News reported the government of Charles Taylor paid 50,000 United States dollars to fix helicopters rather than pay civil servants.
