= Commonwealth District, Grand Cape Mount County =

District of Liberia

Coordinates: 6°45′N 11°22′W

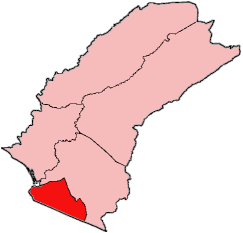
Location of Commonwealth District in Grand Cape Mount County

The Commonwealth District is one of five districts located in Grand Cape Mount County, Liberia. Robertsport, the capital city of Grand Cape Mount County, is located in the district. As of the 2008 Census, it has a population of 6,547, making it the least populated district of Grand Cape Mount County.
