= Michaela Songa =

Liberian actress

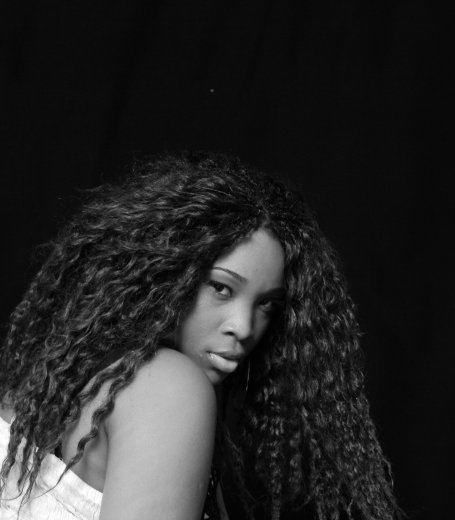
- Born: May 24, 1986 (age 39); Monrovia, Liberia
- Occupations: Writer, freelancer, screenwriter, magazine editor, actress
- Website: libvixen.blogspot.com

Michaela Songa (born May 24, 1986) is a Liberian-born actress, writer, and a magazine editor. Michaela is best known for her series of web journals and her photos through camera lenses. She has recently been working on her movie career by starring in two Liberian movies alongside other up and coming film makers. As a print journalism major in her junior year, she has always stated her desire to stay out of the camera lens as much as possible and focus more on the behind scenes of her printed media.

== Early life ==
Songa was born in Monrovia, Liberia, the daughter of Michael Songa, a renowned Architect and Jennebah Carter. As an only child, she was often pampered by her father which some times got her in trouble in schools with her peers. They routinely taunted her with name callings such as "daddy's girl", "princess", etc. As she gained acceptance with her friends through bribes and stooping to them, she took on a new nickname. Hence "KELO" was born. She asserts to date that she never preferred to be called KELO (short for Michaela), however sources from childhood friends state otherwise. Her birth name reveals her closeness to her father (Michael) more so than worldly things.

== Career ==
Michaela became interested in art since a child. Her dad introduced her to the lens of the camera very early by often documenting her daily activities on tapes and in prints. Her acting career, though her least favorite talent has peaked up by starring in two movies set to be released soon of which "The Desperate Girls" is one. She is currently managing her own blog and a spin-off as an editor-in-chief for zorzor magazine. Her former works could also be seen at African Starz Magazine where she was also the chief editor.

== Filmography ==
- Desperate Girls (2009)
- Split Decision (2009)
- The Heat (2009)
- Beneath The Thoughts (2009)
- Blood Brothers (2009)
- Cheaters Club (2012) (wrote and produced)

== Awards and nominations ==
- Nominated for Best Editor and writer at the 2009 Eagle Awards for Achievement held in Philadelphia.

== Personal life ==
She is a devoted Christian, who through her conversations likes to always give credit to God first. She currently lives in New Jersey. She often does not disclose her residence, in lieu of the fact that, she constantly is not satisfied with permanent settlements. She classifies herself as a woman who likes to interact with her environments, hence she does not want to live at one place for an extended period of time.

== Hobbies ==
Her hobbies are reading and writing movie scripts. She also often ties cooking to her list of hobbies, although she doesn't have a favorite food to cook.
