= Lake Piso =

Lake in Liberia

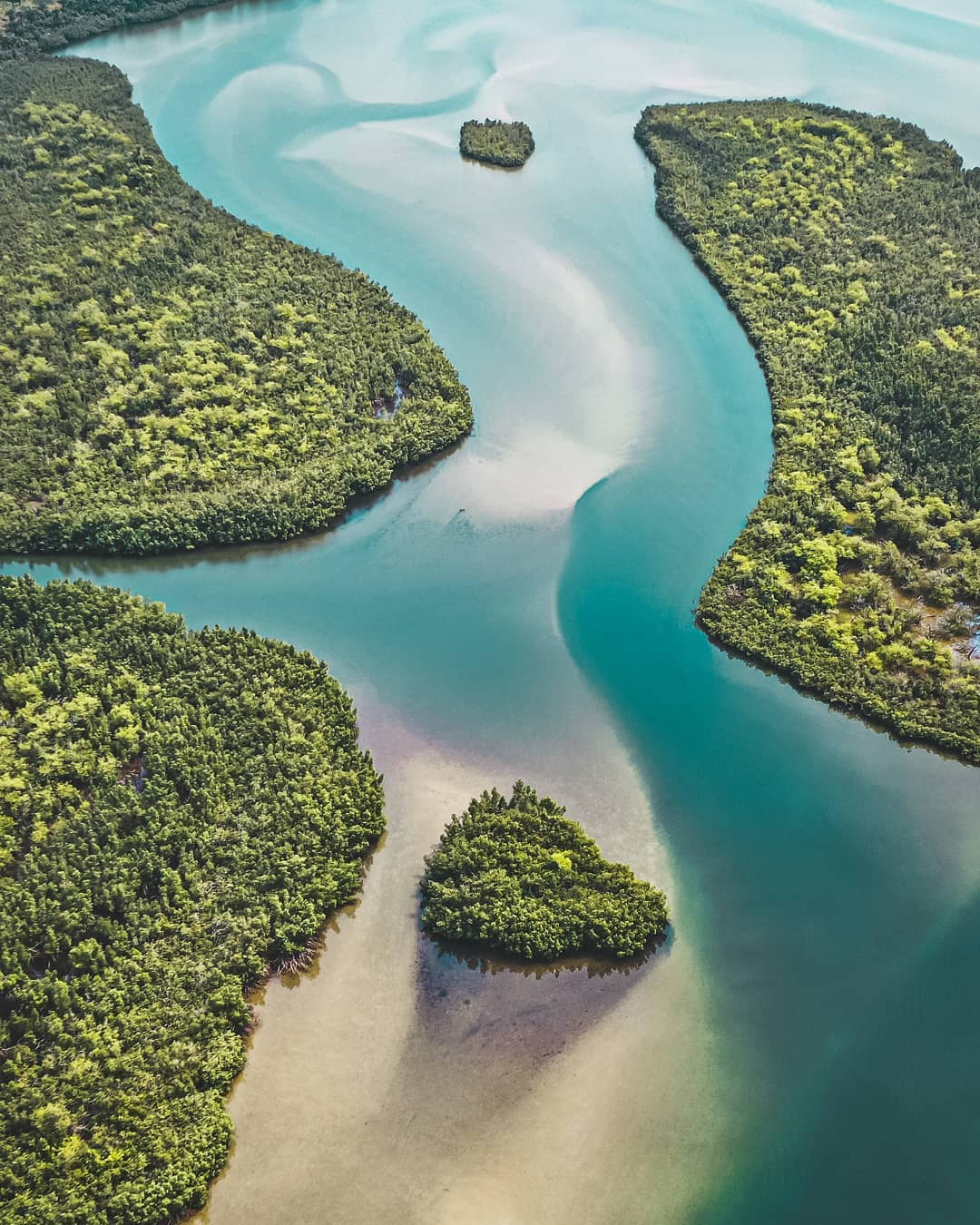

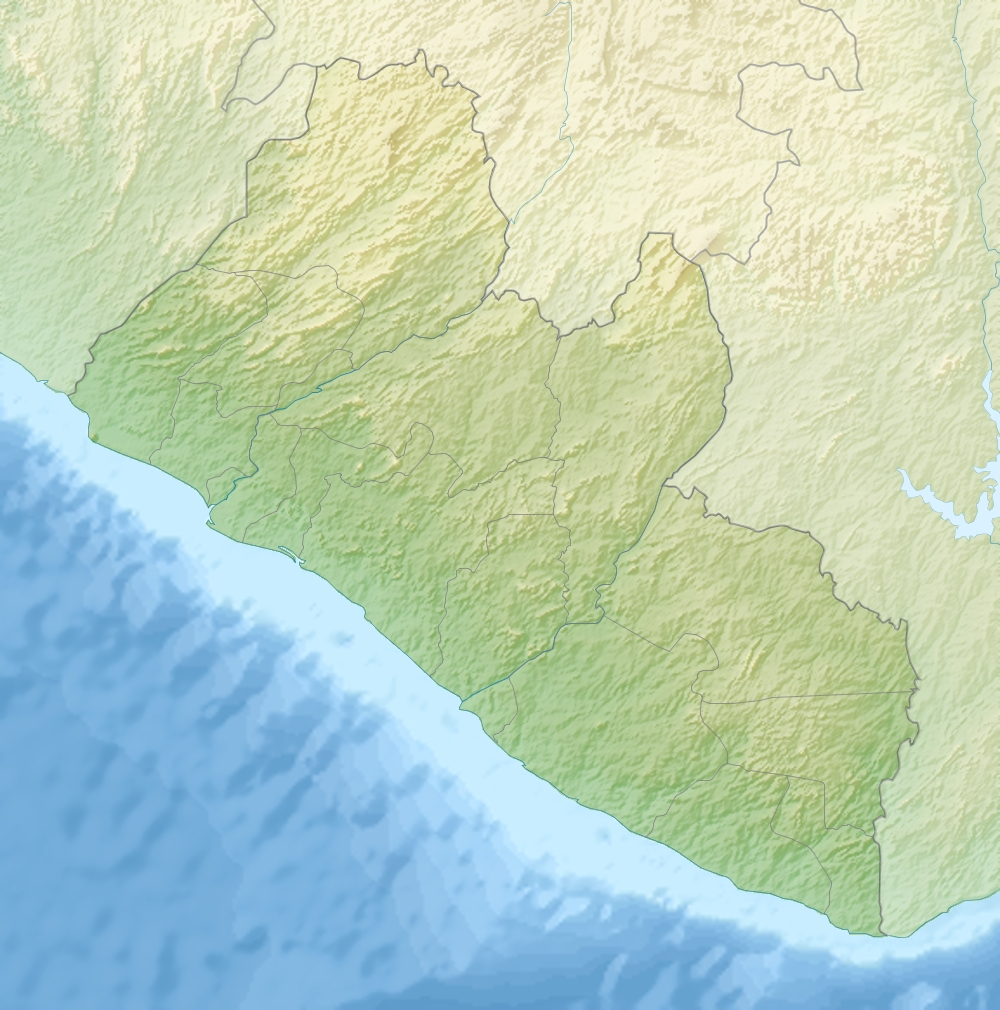
- Location within Liberia
- Location: Grand Cape Mount County
- Coordinates: 6°44′7″N 11°15′4″W
- Primary inflows: various rivers
- Primary outflows: inlet to the Atlantic Ocean
- Basin countries: Liberia
- Max. length: 19 mi (31 km)
- Max. width: 10 mi (16 km)
- Surface area: 103 km^{2} (40 sq mi)
- Islands: several (Massatin Island)

Ramsar Wetland
- Designated: 2 July 2003
- Reference no.: 1306

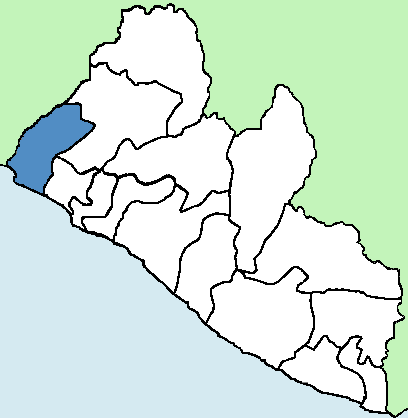
Grand Cape Mount County (highlighted) in western Liberia

Lake Piso, also known as Lake Pisu and Fisherman's Lake, is an oblong tidal lagoon in Grand Cape Mount County in western Liberia, near the town of Robertsport. Its name originates from a local term meaning "pigeon's hole" – a reference to the flocks of pigeons that once came to Lake Piso for water.

== Geography ==
The lake has an area of 103 km^{2} (40 sq mi). It is the largest lake in Liberia.

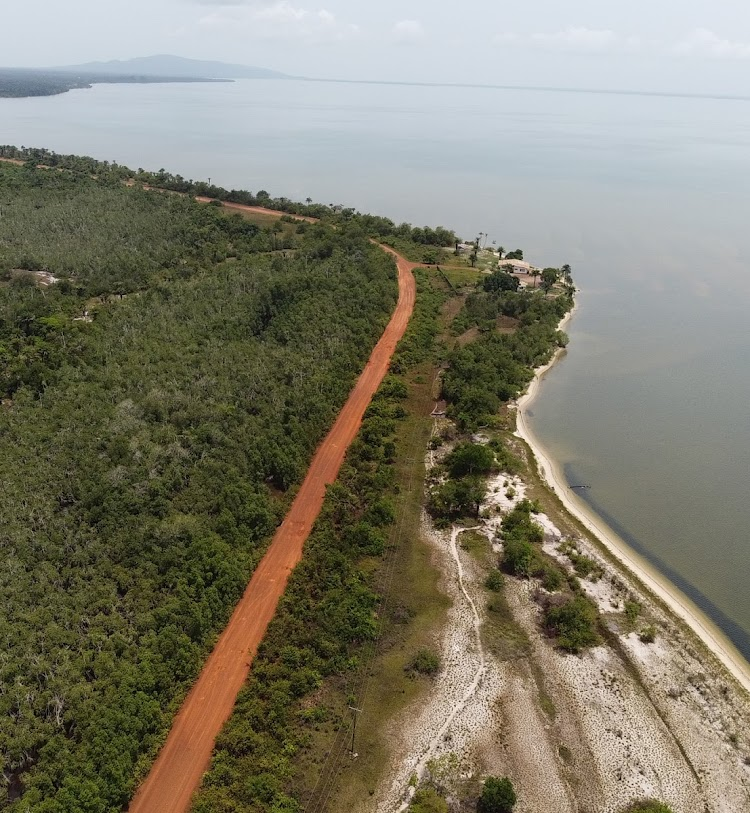
SW view of Lake Piso

=== Hydrology ===
The brackish lake borders the Cape Mount peninsula. It is connected to the Atlantic Ocean by a narrow inlet known locally as the "bar mouth". Various rivers, including Mole Creek and Mafa River, empty into the lake.

=== Environment ===
There are a number of islands in the lake, including Massatin Island, which are havens for monkeys and birds. The lake has been designated an Important Bird Area (IBA) by BirdLife International because it supports significant populations of many bird species.

== History ==
During World War II, Lake Piso functioned as a military base for Allied seaplanes. It also served as temporary refuge for some Liberians during the Liberian Civil War.

Lake Piso overflowed its banks at least twice in 1998, causing heavy flooding in Garwular District. Flooding in August 1998 occurred due to a blockage of the narrow inlet connecting the lake to the Atlantic Ocean, damaging some homes. Additional flooding in September and October, brought about by heavy rains, affected over twenty settlements, causing at least ten deaths, leaving thousands homeless, and forcing others to leave their homes. The floods led the government of Liberia to declare the area a "disaster zone".

On December 13–14, 2002, the Papa Friends 2000 capsized in Lake Piso, at the confluence of the lake and Mafa River. The overcrowded wooden ferry was transporting approximately 200 passengers, most returning from the funeral of a local footballer. Only 15 people were rescued; the rest drowned and were recovered or presumed dead.

A nature reserve was designated near Lake Piso in 1999 and, as of 2004, the Lake Piso wetlands, covering an area of 76,091 ha (761 km^{2}), were Liberia's only designated wetland of international importance.

== Human activity ==
The area near the lagoon is the homeland of the Vai people.

Human activity in Lake Piso includes fishing and water sports such as swimming, canoeing and water skiing. Prior to the outbreak of the First Liberian Civil War, the lagoon was a popular travel destination for tourists.

High-quality diamonds have been mined from the rivers that discharge into Lake Piso where "igneous intrusions provide potentially rich structural traps".
