= Porkpa District =

Coordinates: 7°20′35″N 11°01′30″W

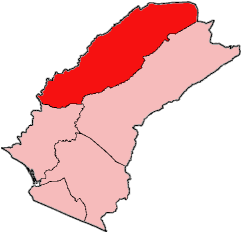
Location of Porkpa District in Grand Cape Mount County

Porkpa District is one of five districts located in Grand Cape Mount County, Liberia. As of the 2008 Census, it has a population of 42,615, making it the most populated district of Grand Cape Mount County.
