= James Hall (governor) =

American physician

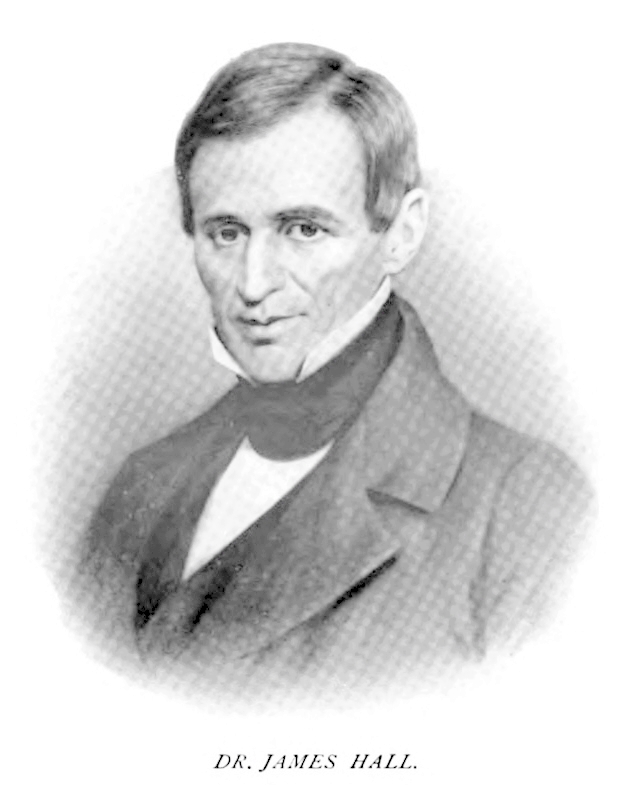

Governor of Maryland-in-Africa
- In office 1833–1836
- Succeeded by: Oliver Holmes Jr.

Personal details
- Born: April 9, 1802 Cornish, New Hampshire
- Died: August 31, 1889 (aged 87) Elkridge, Maryland
- Resting place: Green Mount Cemetery; Baltimore, Maryland
- Spouse: Caroline Matilda (m. 1825; d. 1829)
- Education: Medical School of Maine (MD)

James Hall (April 9, 1802 – August 31, 1889) was an American medical doctor who founded the colony of Maryland-in-Africa. Hall served as its governor from 1833 to 1836.

== Early life and education ==
James Hall was born on April 9, 1802, in Cornish, New Hampshire, to parents Nathaniel and Prudence Hall. James studied medicine with Nathan Smith, and later attended the Medical School of Maine. He graduated with an M.D. in 1822. He practiced medicine in Claremont, New Hampshire, as well as Windsor, Vermont, until 1829, when rheumatism caused James to lose partial use of his left leg, which necessitated the use of a crutch and cane for the rest of his life. He later spent time in the West Indies.

== Maryland-in-Africa ==
In 1831, Hall sailed to Liberia with a group of colonists. There he served as colonial physician for two years, after which he returned to the United States. In 1833, the Maryland State Colonization Society commissioned Hall to establish a new Liberian colony at Cape Palmas. Hall did so, and served as governor of the colony of Maryland-in-Africa from October 1833 until his resignation in July 1836. After his resignation, he returned to the United States. Hall continued work with the Maryland State Colonization Society, as a general agent, as well as with the American Colonization Society, as a commercial agent, from 1840 to 1861. The colony Hall founded gained independence in 1854, but was annexed by Liberia in 1857. In 1877, Hall donated the organization papers of the Maryland State Colonization Society to the Maryland Historical Society.

== Personal life ==
Hall married Caroline Matilda on October 31, 1825, in Charlestown, New Hampshire. Together they had two children. Caroline died in 1829.

== Later life and death ==
Hall spent his retirement in Elkridge, Maryland. Hall there died on August 31, 1889. He was interred in Green Mount Cemetery.
