= History of slavery in Maryland =

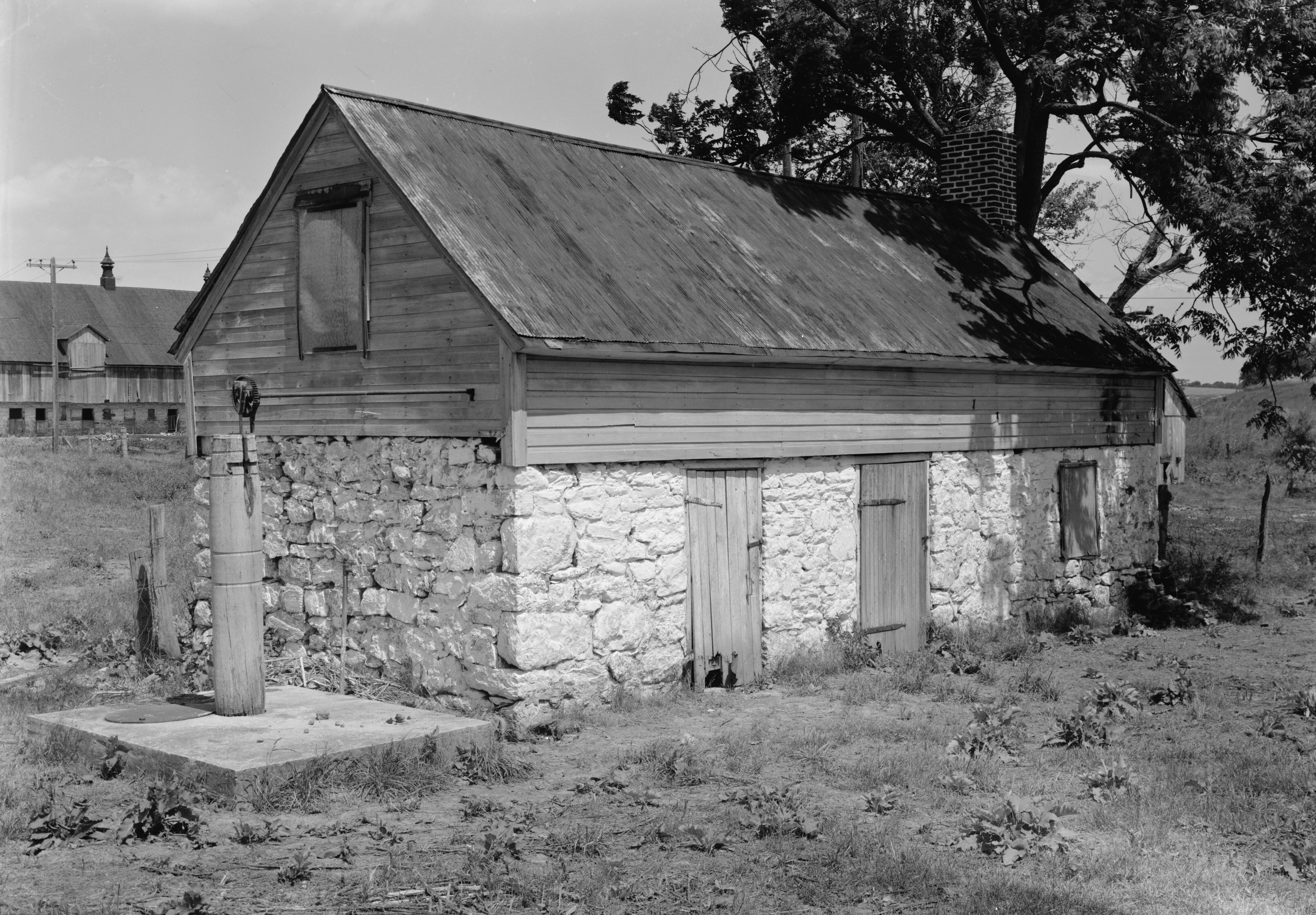
The Piper Farm Slave Quarters in Sharpsburg, Maryland, 1933

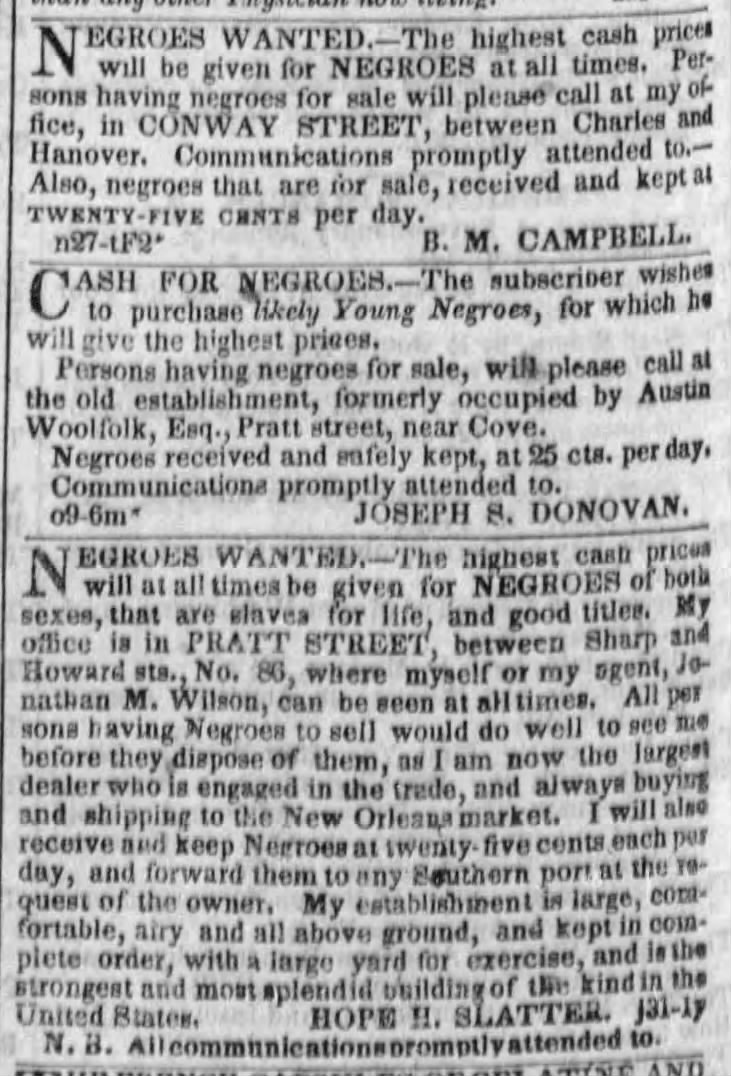
Slave traders Bernard M. Campbell, Joseph S. Donovan, and Hope H. Slatter advertise their jails in The Baltimore Sun, January 19, 1844

Slavery in Maryland lasted over 200 years, from its beginnings in 1642 when the first Africans were brought as slaves to St. Mary's City, to its end after the Civil War. While Maryland developed similarly to neighboring Virginia, slavery declined in Maryland as an institution earlier, and it had the largest free black population by 1860 of any state. The early settlements and population centers of the province tended to cluster around the rivers and other waterways that empty into the Chesapeake Bay. Maryland planters cultivated tobacco as the chief commodity crop, as the market for cash crops was strong in Europe. Tobacco was labor-intensive in both cultivation and processing, and planters struggled to manage workers as tobacco prices declined in the late 17th century, even as farms became larger and more efficient. At first, indentured servants from England supplied much of the necessary labor but, as England's economy improved, fewer came to the colonies. Maryland colonists turned to importing indentured and enslaved Africans to satisfy the labor demand.

By the 18th century, Maryland had developed into a plantation colony and slave society, requiring extensive numbers of field hands for the labor-intensive commodity crop of tobacco. In 1700, the province had a population of about 25,000, and by 1750 that number had grown more than five times to 130,000. By 1755, about 40 percent of Maryland's population was black enslaved people, with African Americans slaves concentrated in the Tidewater counties where tobacco was grown. Planters relied on the extensive system of rivers to transport their produce from inland plantations to the Atlantic coast for export. Baltimore was the second-most important port in the eighteenth-century South, after Charleston, South Carolina.

In the first two decades after the Revolutionary War, some slaveholders freed their slaves. In addition, numerous free families of color had started during the colonial era with mixed-race children born free as a result of unions between white women and African-descended men. Although the colonial and state legislatures passed restrictions against manumissions and free people of color, by the time of the Civil War, slightly more than 49% of the black people (including people of color) in Maryland were free and the total of slaves had steadily declined since 1810.

During the American Civil War, which was fought over the issue of slavery, Maryland remained in the Union, though a minority of its citizens – and virtually all of its slaveholders – were sympathetic toward the rebel Confederate States. As a Union border state, Maryland was not included in President Lincoln's 1863 Emancipation Proclamation, which declared all slaves in states in rebellion to be free. The following year, Maryland held a constitutional convention. A new state constitution was passed on November 1, 1864, and Article 24 prohibited the practice of slavery. The right to vote was extended to non-white males in the Maryland Constitution of 1867, which remains in effect today. (The vote was extended to women of all races in 1920 by ratification of the Nineteenth Amendment to the United States Constitution.)

== Beginnings ==
=== Tobacco ===
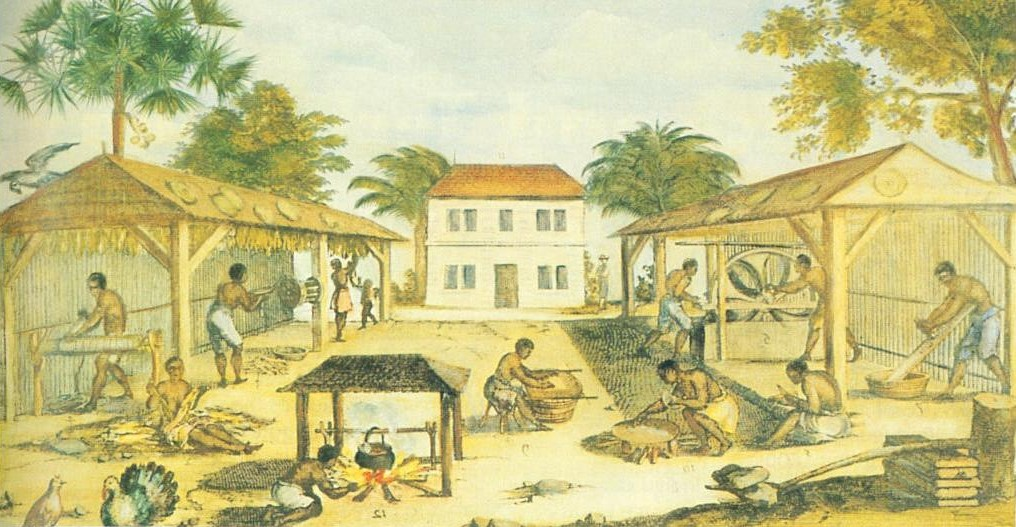
Slaves processing tobacco in 17th-century Virginia

From the beginning, tobacco was the dominant cash crop in Maryland. Such was the importance of tobacco that, in the absence of sufficient silver coins, it served as the chief medium of exchange. John Ogilby wrote in his 1670 book America: Being an Accurate Description of the New World: "The general way of traffick and commerce there is chiefly by Barter, or exchange of one commodity for another".

Since land was plentiful, and the demand for tobacco was growing, labor tended to be in short supply, especially at harvest time. The first Africans to be brought to English North America landed in Virginia in 1619, captured by the Dutch from a Portuguese slave ship. These individuals appear to have been treated as indentured servants. A significant number of Africans after them also gained freedom through fulfilling a work contract or for converting to Christianity.

Some successful free people of color, such as Anthony Johnson, prospered enough to acquire slaves or indentured servants. This evidence suggests that racial attitudes were much more flexible in the colonies in the 17th century before slavery was hardened as a racial caste.

=== Import of enslaved Africans ===
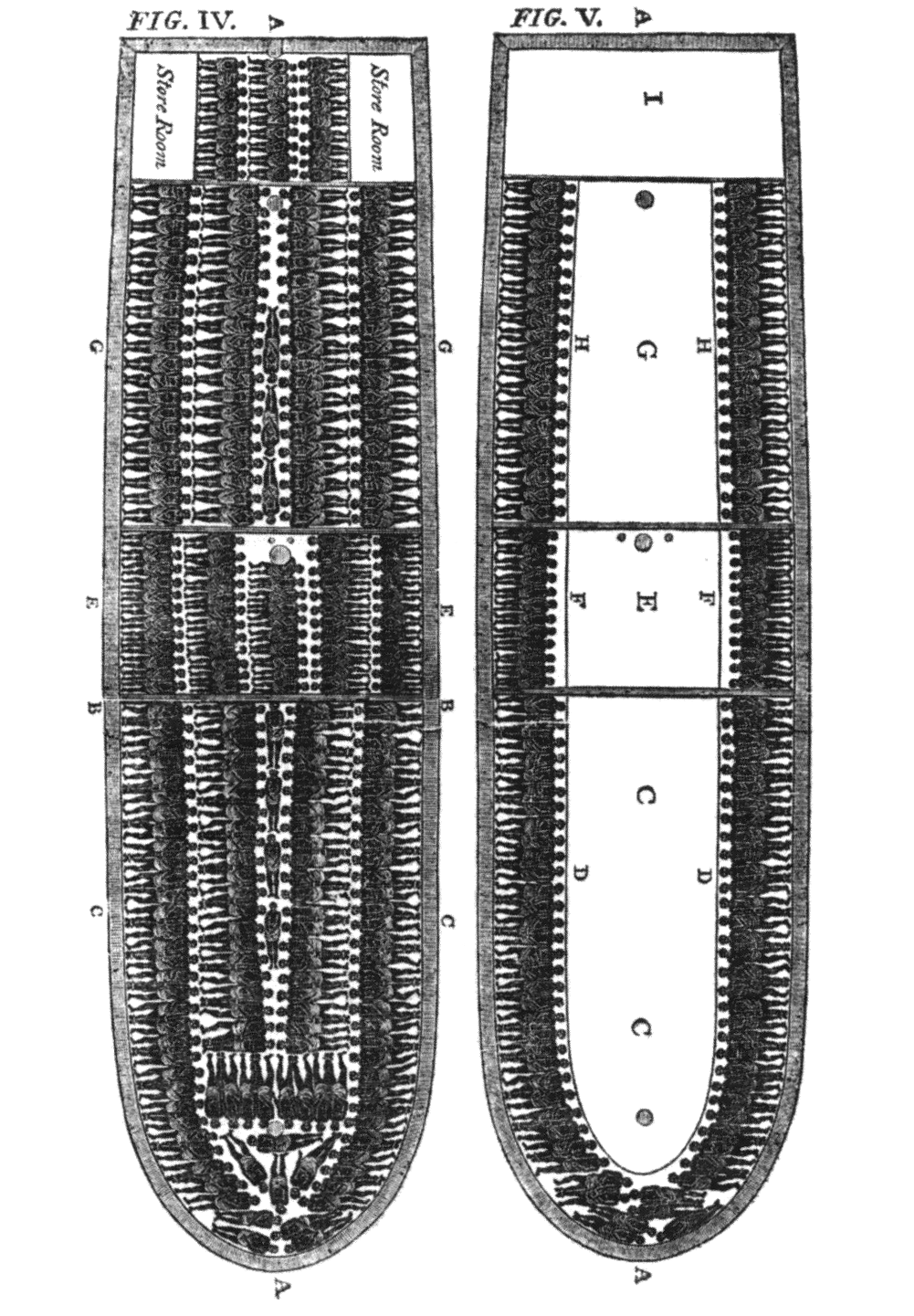
Diagram of a slave ship from the Atlantic slave trade. From an Abstract of Evidence delivered before a select committee of the House of Commons of Great Britain in 1790 and 1791.

The first documented Africans were brought to Maryland in 1642, as 13 slaves at St. Mary's City, the first English settlement in the Province. Earlier, in 1638, the Maryland General Assembly had considered, but not enacted, two bills referring to slaves and proposing excepting them from rights shared by Christian freemen and indentured servants: An Act for the Liberties of the People and An Act Limiting the Times of Servants. The legal status of Africans initially remained undefined; since they were not English subjects, they were considered foreigners. Colonial courts tended to rule that any person who accepted Christian baptism should be freed. In order to protect the property rights of slaveholders, the colony passed laws to clarify the legal position. In 1692 the Maryland Assembly passed a law explicitly forbidding "miscegenation"—marriage between different races. It never controlled the abuse by white men of enslaved African women.

=== State establishes perpetual slavery ===
In 1664, under the governorship of Charles Calvert, 3rd Baron Baltimore, the Assembly ruled that all enslaved people should be held in slavery for life, and that children of enslaved mothers should also be held in slavery for life. The 1664 Act read as follows:

Be it enacted by the Right Honorable, the Lord Proprietary, by the advice and consent of the Upper and Lower House of this present General Assembly, that all negroes or other slaves already within the Province, and all negroes and other slaves to be hereafter imported into the Province shall serve durante vita. And all children born of any negro or other slave shall be slaves as their fathers were for the term of their lives.

In this way the institution of slavery in Maryland was made self-perpetuating, as the slaves had good enough health to reproduce. The numbers of slaves in Maryland was increased even more by continued imports up until 1808. By making slave status dependent on the mother, according to the principle of partus sequitur ventrem, Maryland, like Virginia, abandoned the common law approach of England, in which the social status of children of English subjects depended on their father. In the colonies, children would take the status of their mothers and thus be born into slavery if their mothers were enslaved, regardless if their fathers were white and Christian, as many were.

The wording of the 1664 Act suggests that Africans may not have been the only slaves in Maryland. Although there is no direct evidence of the enslavement of Native Americans, the reference to "negroes and other slaves" may imply that, as in Massachusetts, Virginia and the Carolinas, the colonists may have enslaved local Indians. Alternatively, the wording in the Act may have been intended to apply to slaves of African origin but of mixed-race ancestry. The early years included slaves who were African Creoles, descendants of African women and Portuguese men who worked at the slave ports. In addition, mixed-race children were born to slave women and white fathers. Numerous free families of color were formed during the colonial years by formal and informal unions between free white women and African-descended men, whether free, indentured or enslaved. Although born free to white women, the mixed-race children were considered illegitimate and were apprenticed for lengthy periods into adulthood.

In an unusual case, Nell Butler was an Irish-born indentured servant of Lord Calvert. After she married an enslaved African, her indenture was converted to slavery for life under the 1664 Act.

Further legislation would follow, entrenching and deepening the institution of slavery. Following the lead of Virginia, in 1671 the Assembly passed an Act stating expressly that baptism of a slave would not lead to freedom. Prior to this some slaves had sued for freedom based on having been baptized. The Act was apparently intended to save the souls of the enslaved; the legislature did not want to discourage slaveholders from baptizing his human property for fear of losing it. In practice, such laws permitted both Christianity and slavery to develop hand in hand.

At this early stage in Maryland history, slaves were not especially numerous in the Province, being greatly outnumbered by indentured servants from England. The full effect of such harsh slave laws did not become evident until after large-scale importation of Africans began in earnest in the 1690s. During the second half of the 17th century, the British economy gradually improved and the supply of British indentured servants declined, as poor Britons had better economic opportunities at home. At the same time, Bacon's Rebellion of 1676 led planters to worry about the prospective dangers of creating a large class of restless, landless, and relatively poor white men (most of them former indentured servants). Wealthy Virginia and Maryland planters began to buy slaves in preference to indentured servants during the 1660s and 1670s, and poorer planters followed suit by c.1700. Enslaved Africans cost more than servants, so initially only the wealthy could invest in slavery. By the end of the seventeenth century, planters shifted away from indentured servants, and in favor of the importation and enslavement of African people.

== Eighteenth century ==
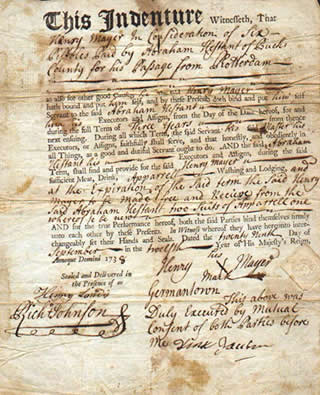
A contract of Indenture signed by Henry Meyer in 1738. In early Maryland, indentured servants outnumbered slaves.

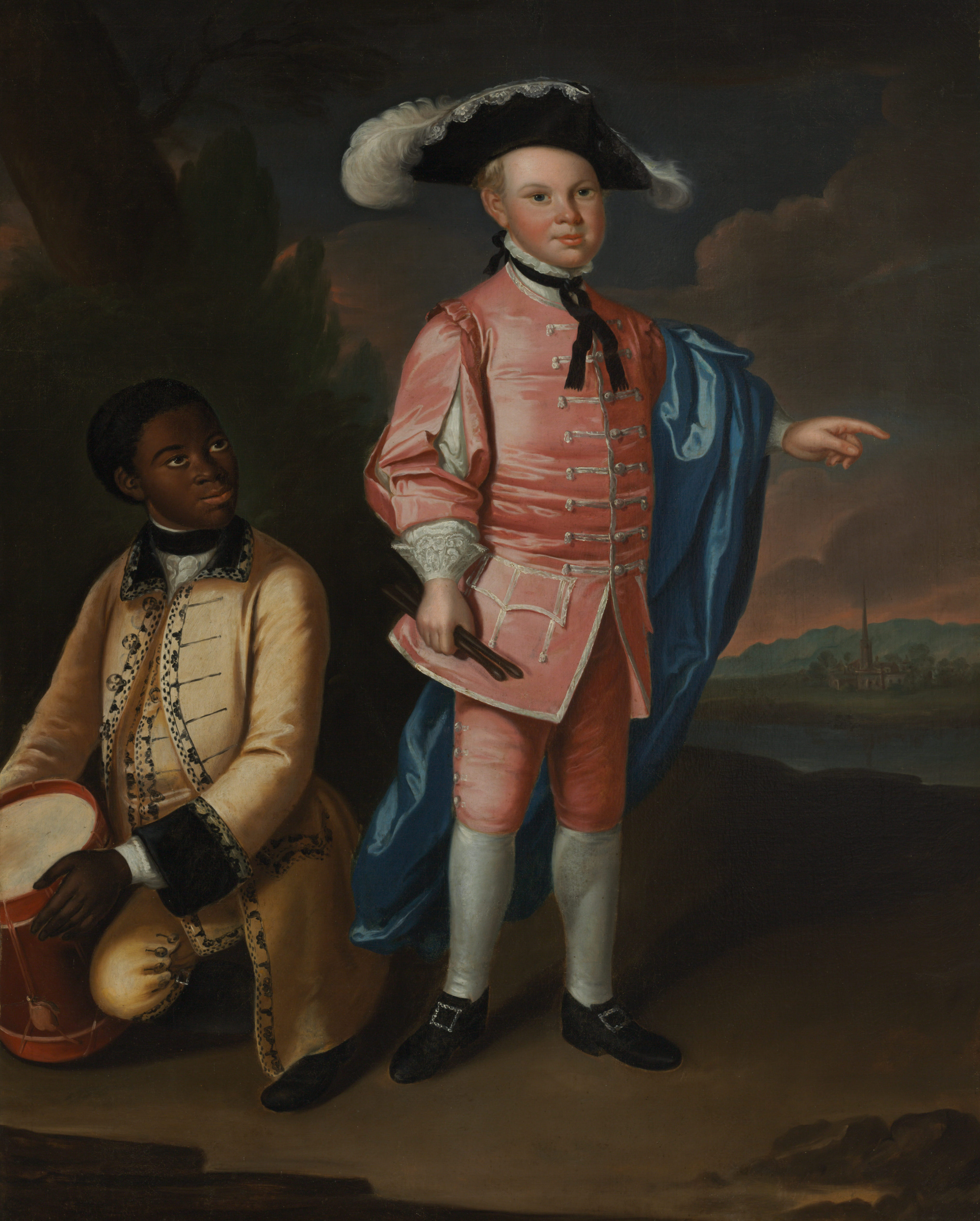
Charles Calvert, eldest son of Benedict Swingate Calvert, painted by John Hesselius in 1761, accompanied by an enslaved boy

During the eighteenth century the number of enslaved Africans imported into Maryland greatly increased, as the labor-intensive tobacco economy became dominant, and the colony developed into a slave society. In 1700 there were about 25,000 people in Maryland and by 1750 that had grown more than 5 times to 130,000. A great proportion of the population was enslaved. By 1755, about 40% of Maryland's population was black and these persons were overwhelmingly enslaved. The southern plantation counties had majority-slave populations by the end of the century.

In 1753 the Maryland assembly took further harsh steps to institutionalize slavery, passing a law that prohibited any slaveholder from independently manumitting his slaves. A slaveholder seeking manumission had to gain legislative approval for each act, meaning that few did so.

At this stage there were few voices of dissent among whites in Maryland. Although only the wealthy could afford slaves, poor whites who did not own slaves may have aspired to own them someday. The identity of many whites in Maryland, and the South in general, was tied up in the idea of white supremacy. As the French political philosopher Montesquieu noted in 1748: "It is impossible for us to suppose these creatures [enslaved Africans] to be men; because allowing them to be men, a suspicion would follow that we ourselves are not Christians."

== Revolutionary War ==
An animation showing when United States territories and states forbade or allowed slavery, 1789–1861

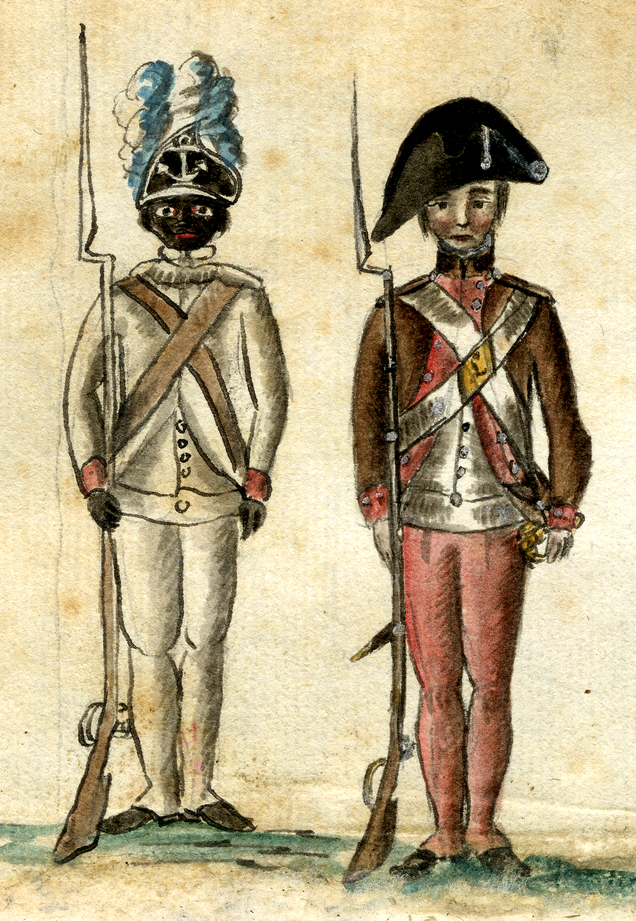
African-American soldier from Rhode Island serving in the Continental Army's 1st Rhode Island Regiment. Standing next to him is a white American soldier.

The principal cause of the American Revolution was liberty, but only on behalf of white men, and certainly not slaves, Indians or women. The British, desperately short of manpower, sought to enlist African Americans as soldiers to fight on behalf of the Crown, promising them liberty in exchange. As a result of the looming crisis in 1775 the Royal Governor of Virginia, Lord Dunmore, issued a proclamation that promised freedom to servants and slaves who were able to bear arms and join his Loyalist Ethiopian Regiment:

... I do require every Person capable of bearing Arms, to resort to His MAJESTY'S STANDARD, or be looked upon as Traitors to His MAJESTY'S Crown and Government, and thereby become liable to the Penalty the Law inflicts upon such Offenses; such as forfeiture of Life, confiscation of Lands, &. &. And I do hereby further declare all indented Servants, Negroes, or others, (appertaining to Rebels,) free that are able and willing to bear Arms, they joining His MAJESTY'S Troops as soon as may be, for the more speedily reducing this Colony to a proper Sense of their Duty, to His MAJESTY'S Crown and Dignity.

— Lord Dunmore's Proclamation, November 7, 1775

About 800 men joined up; some helped rout the Virginia militia at the Battle of Kemp's Landing and fought in the Battle of Great Bridge on the Elizabeth River, wearing the motto "Liberty to Slaves", but this time they were defeated. The remains of their regiment were involved in the evacuation of Norfolk, after which they served in the Chesapeake area. Their camp suffered an outbreak of smallpox and other infectious diseases. This took a heavy toll, putting many of them out of action for some time. The survivors joined other British units and continued to serve throughout the war. Blacks were often the first to come forward to volunteer, and a total of 12,000 blacks served with the British from 1775 to 1783. This factor had the effect of forcing the rebels to also offer freedom to those who would serve in the Continental Army; ultimately, more than 5,000 African Americans (many of them enslaved) served in Patriot military units during the war. Thousands of slaves in the South left their plantations to join the British. Keeping their promise, the British transported about 3,000 freed slaves to Nova Scotia, where they granted them land. Others were taken to the Caribbean colonies, or to London.

In general, the war left the institution of slavery largely unaffected, and the prosperous life of successful Maryland planters was revived. The writer Abbe Robin, who travelled through Maryland during the American Revolutionary War, described the lifestyle enjoyed by families of wealth and status in the Province:

[Maryland houses] are large and spacious habitations, widely separated, composed of a number of buildings and surrounded by plantations extending farther than the eye can reach, cultivated ... by unhappy black men whom European avarice brings hither ... Their furniture is of the most costly wood, and rarest marbles, enriched by skilful and artistic work. Their elegant and light carriages are drawn by finely bred horses, and driven by richly apparelled slaves.

Slave labor made possible the export-driven plantation economy. The English observer William Strickland wrote of agriculture in Virginia and Maryland in the 1790s:

Nothing can be conceived more inert than a slave; his unwilling labour is discovered in every step he takes; he moves not if he can avoid it; if the eyes of the overseer be off him, he sleeps. The ox and horse, driven by the slave, appear to sleep also; all is listless inactivity; all motion is evidently compulsory.

== Voices for abolition ==
=== Methodists and Quakers ===
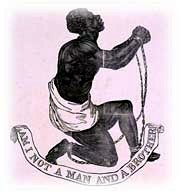
An antislavery medallion of the early 19th century

The American Revolution had been fought for the cause of liberty of individual men, and many Marylanders who opposed slavery believed that Africans were equally men and should be free. Methodists in particular, of whom Maryland had more than any other state in the Union, were opposed to slavery on Christian grounds. In 1780 the National Methodist Conference in Baltimore officially condemned slavery. In 1784 the church threatened Methodist preachers with suspension if they held people in slavery. This was a period of the Great Awakening, and Methodists preached the spiritual equality of men, as well as licensing slaves and free blacks as preachers and deacons.

The Methodist movement in the United States as a whole was not of one voice on the subject of slavery. By the antebellum years in the South, most Methodist congregations supported the institution and preachers had made their peace with it, working to improve conditions of the institution. Ministers (and their congregants) often cited Old Testament scriptures as justification, which they interpreted as representing slavery as a part of the natural order of things. Eventually the Methodist Church split into two regional associations over the issue of slavery before the Civil War.

Those looking for Biblical support cited Leviticus Chapter 25, verses 44–46, which state as follows:

44 Both thy bondmen, and thy bondmaids, which thou shalt have, shall be of the heathen that are round about you; of them shall ye buy bondmen and bondmaids.

45 Moreover of the children of the strangers that do sojourn among you, of them shall ye buy, and of their families that are with you, which they begat in your land: and they shall be your possession.

46 And ye shall take them as an inheritance for your children after you, to inherit them for a possession; they shall be your bondmen for ever: but over your brethren the children of Israel, ye shall not rule one over another with rigour.

New Testament writings were sometimes used to support the case for slavery as well. Some of the writings of Paul, especially in Ephesians, instruct slaves to remain obedient to their masters. Southern ideology after the Revolution developed to argue a paternalistic point of view, that slavery was beneficial for enslaved people as well as the people who held them in slavery. They said that Christian planters could concentrate on improving treatment of slaves and that the people in bondage were offered protections from many ills, and treated better than industrial workers in the North.

In the mid-1790s the Methodists and the Quakers drew together to form the Maryland Society of the Abolition of Slavery. Together they lobbied the legislature. In 1796 they gained repeal of the 1753 law that had prohibited individual manumissions by a slaveholder. Responding to Methodist and Quaker persuasion, as well as revolutionary ideals and lower labor needs, in the first two decades after the war, a number of slaveholders freed their slaves. In 1815 the Methodists and Quakers formed the Protection Society of Maryland, a group which sought protection for the increasing number of free blacks living in the state. By the time of the Civil War, 49.1% of Maryland blacks were free, including most of the large black population of Baltimore.

=== Roman Catholic Church ===
Other churches in Maryland were pro-slavery. The Roman Catholic Church in Maryland and its members had long tolerated slavery. Despite a firm stand for the spiritual equality of black people, Jesuit missioners also continued to own slaves on their plantations. The Jesuits controlled six plantations totaling nearly 12,000 acres, some of which had been donated to the church. In 1838 they ended slaveholding with a mass sale of their 272 slaves to sugar cane plantations in Louisiana in the Deep South. This was historically one of the largest single slave sales in colonial Maryland. The Jesuits' plantations had not been managed profitably, and they wanted to devote their funds to urban areas, including their schools, such as Georgetown College, located near the busy port on the Potomac River adjacent to Washington, D.C., and two new Catholic high schools in Philadelphia and New York City. The Jesuits believed that their mission had to be redirected to urban areas, where the number of Catholic European immigrants were increasing. Pope Gregory XVI issued a resounding condemnation of slavery in his 1839 bull In supremo apostolatus.

=== Notable Maryland enslaved African-Americans ===
==== Frederick Douglass ====
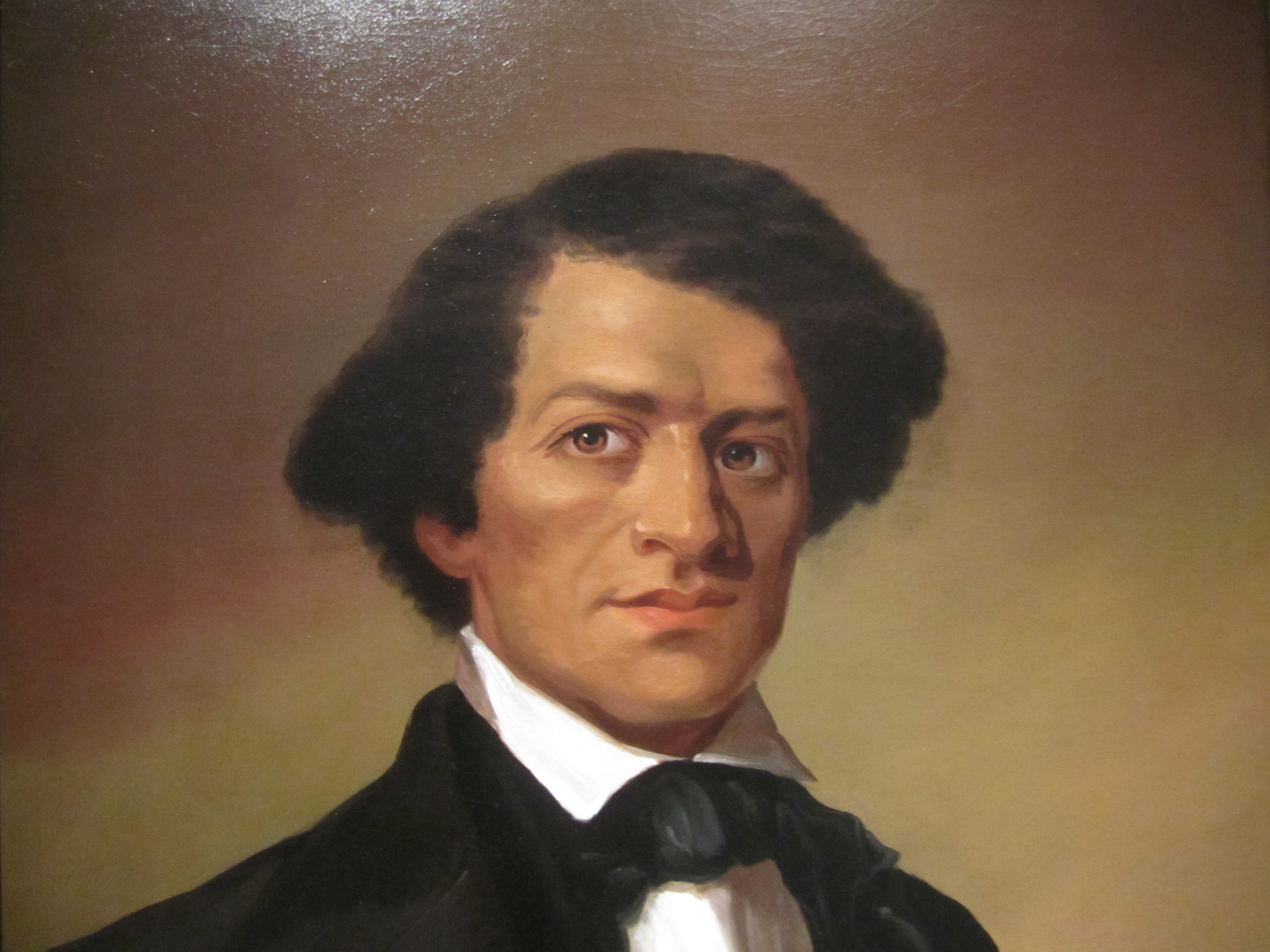
Frederick Douglass in his painted portrait, held at the National Portrait Gallery in Washington, D.C.

After his escape from slavery as a young man, Frederick Douglass remained in the North, where he became an influential national voice in favor of abolition and lectured widely about the abuses of slavery. Douglass was born a slave in Talbot County, Maryland, between Hillsboro and Cordova, probably in his grandmother's shack east of Tappers Corner (38.8845°N 75.958°W) and west of Tuckahoe Creek. The exact date of his birth is unknown, though it seems likely he was born in 1818. Douglass wrote of his childhood:

The opinion was ... whispered that my master was my father; but of the correctness of this opinion I know nothing. ... My mother and I were separated when I was but an infant. ... It [was] common custom, in the part of Maryland from which I ran away, to part children from their mothers at a very early age.
I do not recollect ever seeing my mother by the light of day. ... She would lie down with me, and get me to sleep, but long before I waked she was gone.

— Chapter I

Douglass wrote several autobiographies, eloquently describing his experiences in slavery in his 1845 autobiography, Narrative of the Life of Frederick Douglass, an American Slave. It became influential in its support for abolition, and Douglass spoke widely on the Northern abolition lecture circuit.

==== Harriet Tubman ====
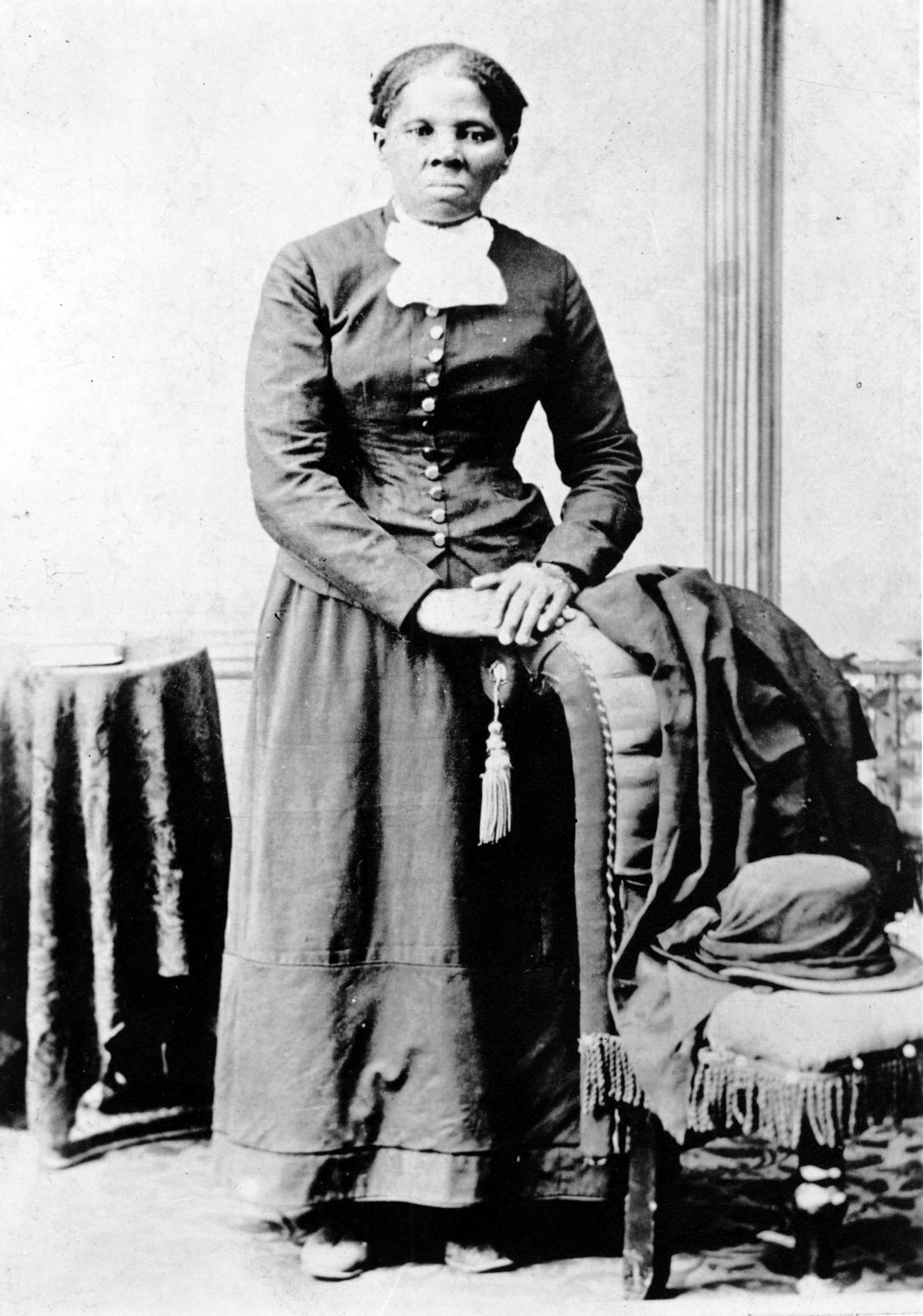
Harriet Tubman

In 1822, Harriet Tubman was born into slavery in Dorchester County, Maryland. After escaping in 1849, she returned secretly to the state several times, helping a total of 70 slaves (including relatives) make their way to freedom. She used the Underground Railroad to make thirteen missions. While later working in the Union Army, Tubman helped more than 700 slaves escape during the Raid at Combahee Ferry.

=== Maryland State Colonization Society ===
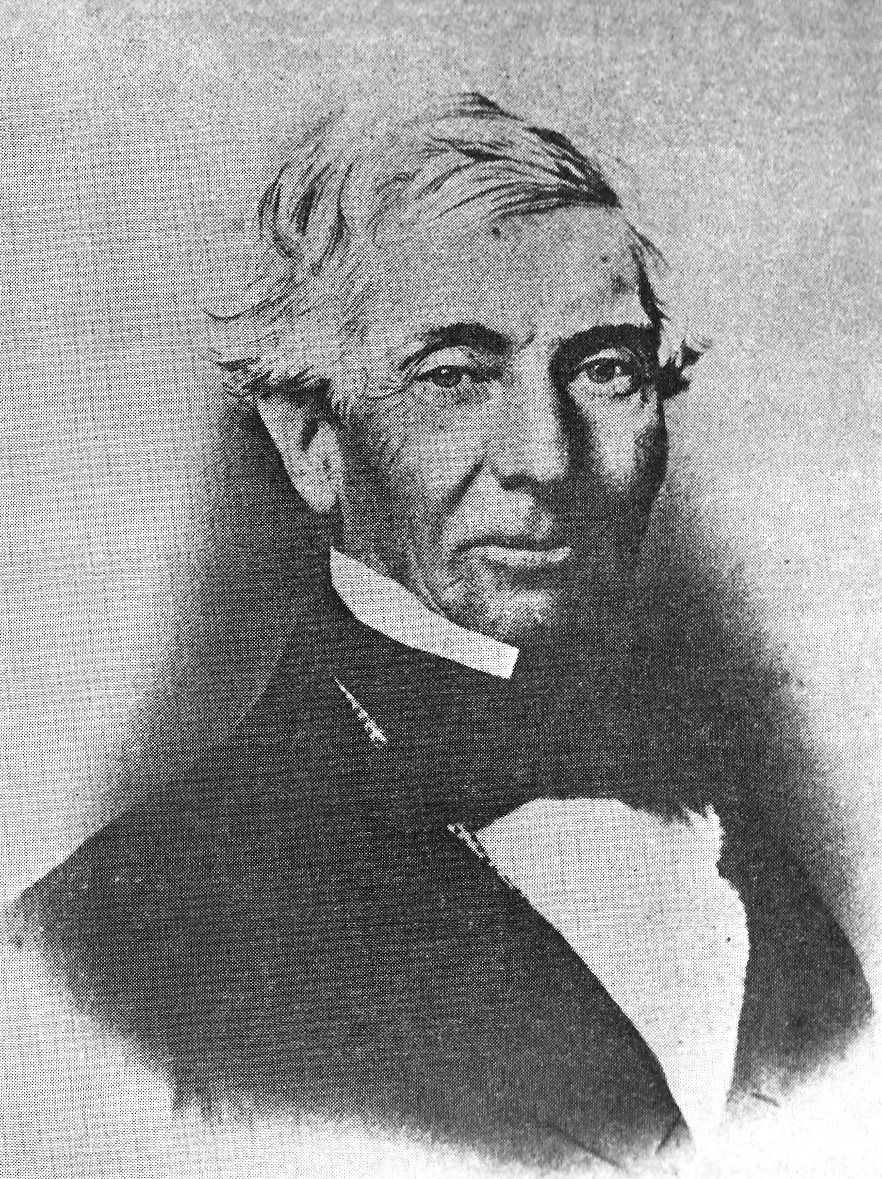
Richard Sprigg Steuart thought African colonization was "the only hope" to end slavery in Maryland.

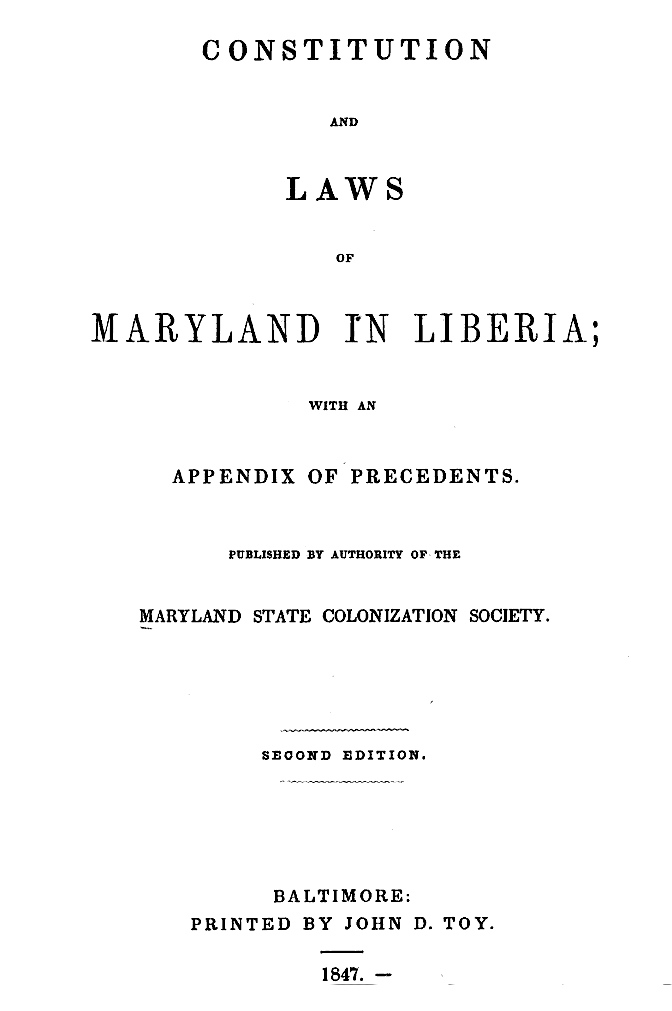
Constitution and Laws of Maryland in Liberia, published by the Maryland State Colonization Society, 1847

Concerned about the tensions of discrimination against free blacks (often free people of color with mixed ancestry) and the threat they posed to slave societies, planters and others organized the Maryland State Colonization Society in 1817 as an auxiliary branch of the American Colonization Society, founded in Washington, D.C., in 1816. The MSCS had strong Christian support and was the primary organization proposing "return" of all free African Americans to a colony to be established in Africa. But, by this time, most slaves and free blacks had been born in the United States, and wanted to gain their rights in the country they felt was theirs.

The ACS founded the colony of Liberia in 1821–22, as a place in West Africa for freedmen. Wanting to control its own territory and solve its perceived problems, the Maryland State Colonization Society founded the Republic of Maryland in West Africa, a short-lived independent state. In 1857 it was annexed by Liberia.

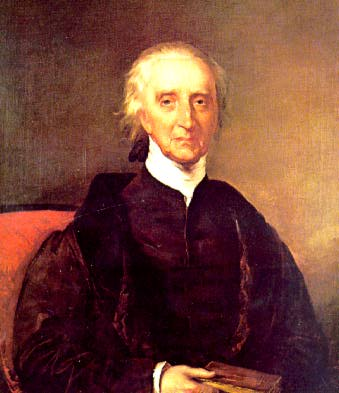
Charles Carroll of Carrollton, planter, signer of the American Declaration of Independence, and president of the MSCS in 1828

The society was founded in 1827, and its first president was the wealthy Maryland Catholic planter Charles Carroll of Carrollton, who was a substantial slaveholder. Although Carroll supported the gradual abolition of slavery, he did not free his own slaves, perhaps fearing that they might be rendered destitute by the difficulties of earning a living in the discriminatory society. Carroll introduced a bill for the gradual abolition of slavery in the Maryland senate but it did not pass.

Many wealthy Maryland planters were members of the MSCS. Among these were the Steuart family, who owned considerable estates in the Chesapeake Bay, including Major General George H. Steuart, who was on the board of Managers; his father James Steuart, who was vice-president; and his brother, the physician Richard Sprigg Steuart, also on the board of Managers.

In an open letter to John Carey in 1845, published in Baltimore by the printer John Murphy, Richard Sprigg Steuart set out his views on the subject of relocating freed slaves to Africa. Such opinions were likely widespread among Maryland slaveholders:

The colored man [must] look to Africa, as his only hope of preservation and of happiness ... it can not be denied that the question is fraught with great difficulties and perplexities, but ... it will be found that this course of procedure ... will ... at no very distant period, secure the removal of the great body of the African people from our State. The President of the Maryland Colonization Society points to this in his address, where he says "the object of Colonization is to prepare a home in Africa for the free colored people of the State, to which they may remove when the advantages which it offers, and above all the pressure of irresistible circumstances in this country, shall excite them to emigrate.

The society proposed from the outset "to be a remedy for slavery", and declared in 1833:

Resolved, That this society believe, and act upon the belief, that colonization tends to promote emancipation, by affording the emancipated slave a home where he can be happier than in this country, and so inducing masters to manumit who would not do so unconditionally ... [so that] at a time not remote, slavery would cease in the state by the full consent of those interested.

=== Republic of Maryland founded in Africa ===
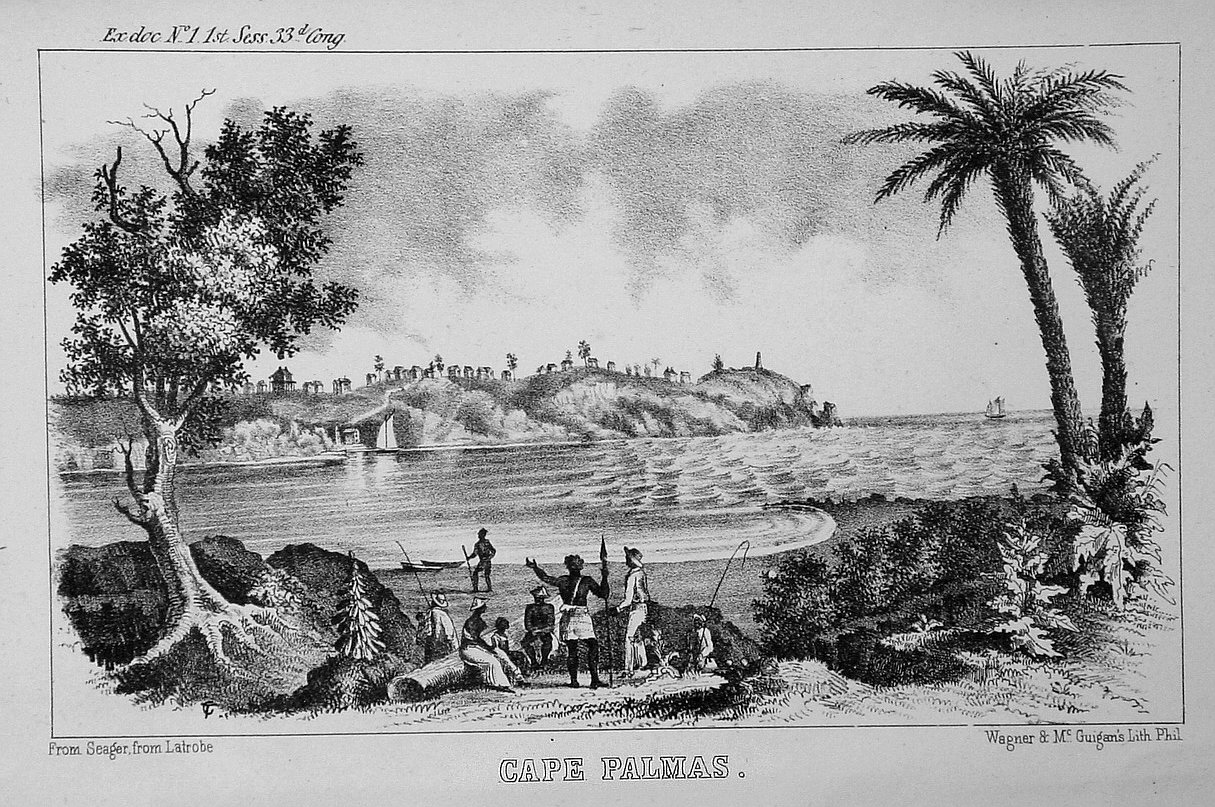
Cape Palmas, founded by the Maryland State Colonization Society, in an etching dated c1853

In December 1831, the Maryland state legislature appropriated $10,000 for twenty-six years to transport free blacks and formerly enslaved people from the United States to Africa. The act authorized appropriation of funds of up to $20,000 a year, up to a total of $200,000, in order to begin the process of African colonization. Most of the money would be spent on the colony itself, to make it attractive to settlers. Free passage was offered, plus rent, 5 acres (20,000 m^{2}) of land to farm, and low-interest loans which would eventually be forgiven if the settlers chose to remain in the colony. The remainder was spent on agents paid to publicize the new colony.

Following Nat Turner's Slave Rebellion in 1831 in Virginia, Maryland and other states passed laws restricting the freedoms of free people of color, as slaveholders feared their effect on slave societies. Persons who were manumitted were given a deadline to leave the state after gaining freedom, unless a court of law found them to be of such "extraordinary good conduct and character" that they might be permitted to remain. A slaveholder who manumitted a slave was required to report that action and person to the authorities, and county clerks who did not do so could be fined. To carry out the removal of free blacks from the state, the Maryland State Colonization Society was established. It was similar to the national American Colonization Society.

In 1832 the legislature placed new restrictions on the liberty of free blacks, in order to encourage emigration. They were not permitted to vote, serve on juries, or hold public office. Unemployed adult free people of color without visible means of support could be re-enslaved at the discretion of local sheriffs. By this means the supporters of colonization hoped to encourage free blacks to leave the state.

John Latrobe, for two decades the president of the MSCS, and later president of the ACS, proclaimed that settlers would be motivated by the "desire to better one's condition", and that sooner or later "every free person of color" would be persuaded to leave Maryland.

== Underground Railroad ==
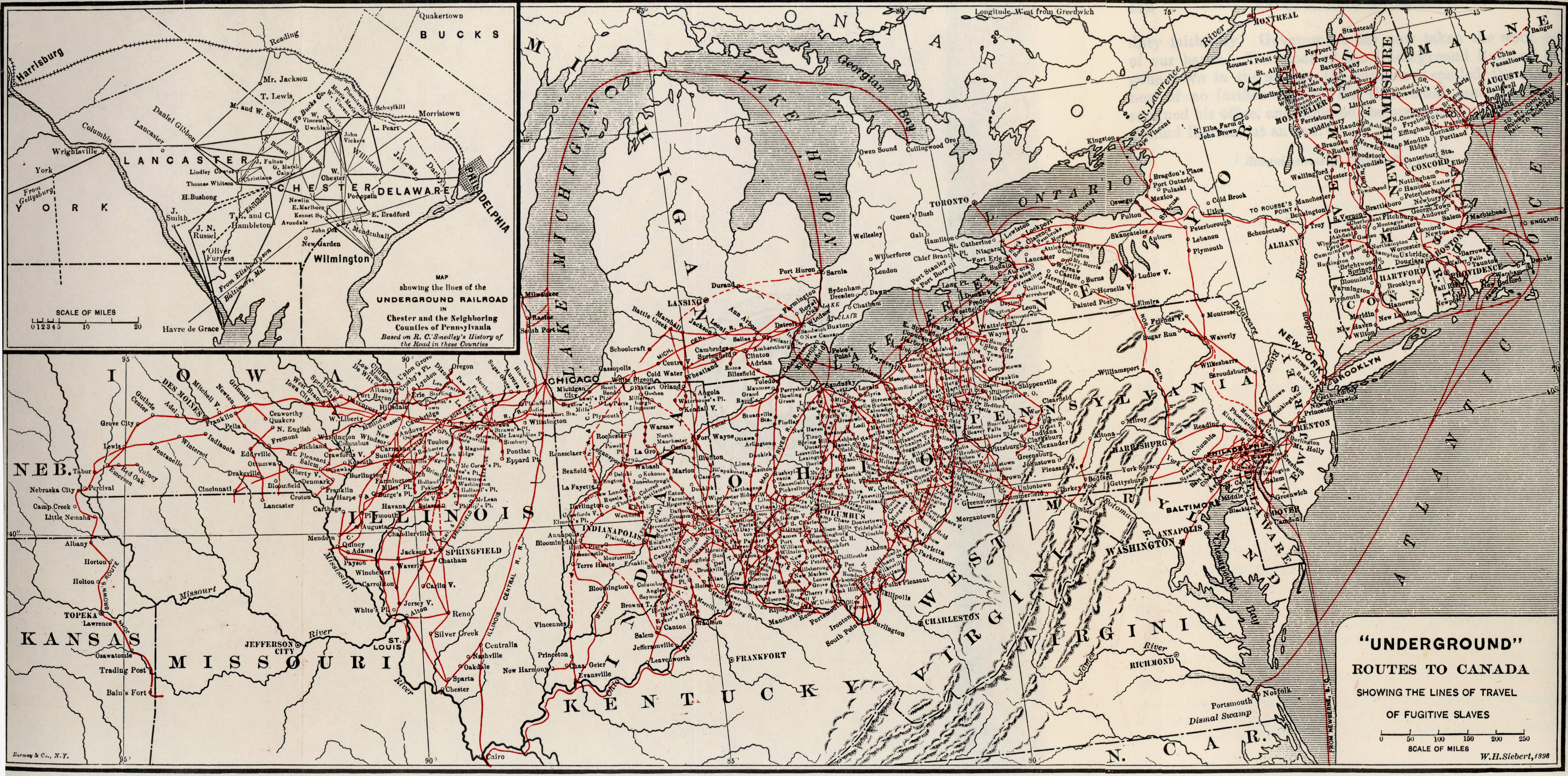
Map showing various Underground Railroad routes

For braver souls, impatient with efforts to abolish slavery within the law, there were always illegal methods. Slaves escaped independently; most often they were young males, as they could move more freely than women with children. Free blacks and white supporters of abolition of slavery gradually organized a number of safe places and guides, creating the Underground Railroad to help slaves gain safety in Northern states. The many Indian trails and waterways of Maryland, and in particular the countless inlets of the Chesapeake Bay, afforded numerous ways to escape north by boat or land, with many people going to Pennsylvania as the nearest free state. Supporters would shelter refugees, and sometimes give them food and clothing.

As the numbers of slaves seeking freedom in the North grew, so did the reward for their capture. In 1806, the reward offered for the recaptured slaves was $6, but by 1833 it had risen to $30. In 1844, recaptured freedom seekers fetched $15 if recaptured within 30 miles (48 km) of the owner and $50 if captured more than 30 miles (48 km) away.

== Status of slavery in 1860 ==
By the 1850s few Marylanders still believed that colonization was the solution to the perceived problems of slavery and free blacks in society. Although one in every six Maryland families still held slaves, most slaveholders held only a few per household. Support for the institution of slavery was localized, varying according to its importance to the local economy and it continued to be integral to Southern Maryland's plantations.

By 1860 Maryland's free black population comprised 49.1% of the total number of African Americans in the state. The small state of Maryland was home to nearly 84,000 free blacks in 1860, by far the most of any state; the state had ranked as having the highest number of free blacks since 1810. In addition, by this time, the vast majority of blacks in Baltimore were free, and this free black population was more than in any other US city. Many planters in Maryland had freed their slaves in the years following the Revolutionary War. In addition, families of free people of color had been formed during colonial times from unions between free white women and men of African descent and various social classes, and their descendants were among the free. As children took their status from their mothers, these mixed-race children were born free.

Marylanders might agree in principle that slavery could and should be abolished, but they were slow to achieve it statewide. Although the need for slaves had declined with the shift away from tobacco culture, and slaves were being sold to the Deep South, slavery was still too deeply embedded into Maryland society for the wealthiest whites to give it up voluntarily on a wide scale. Wealthy planters exercised considerable economic and political power in the state. Slavery did not end until after the Civil War.

Total Enslaved Population in Maryland 1790–1860
Census Year	1790	1800	1810	1820	1830	1840	1850	1860
All States	694,207	887,612	1,130,781	1,529,012	1,987,428	2,482,798	3,200,600	3,950,546
Maryland	103,036	105,635	111,502	107,398	102,994	89,737	90,368	87,189

== Civil War ==
=== Approach of war ===
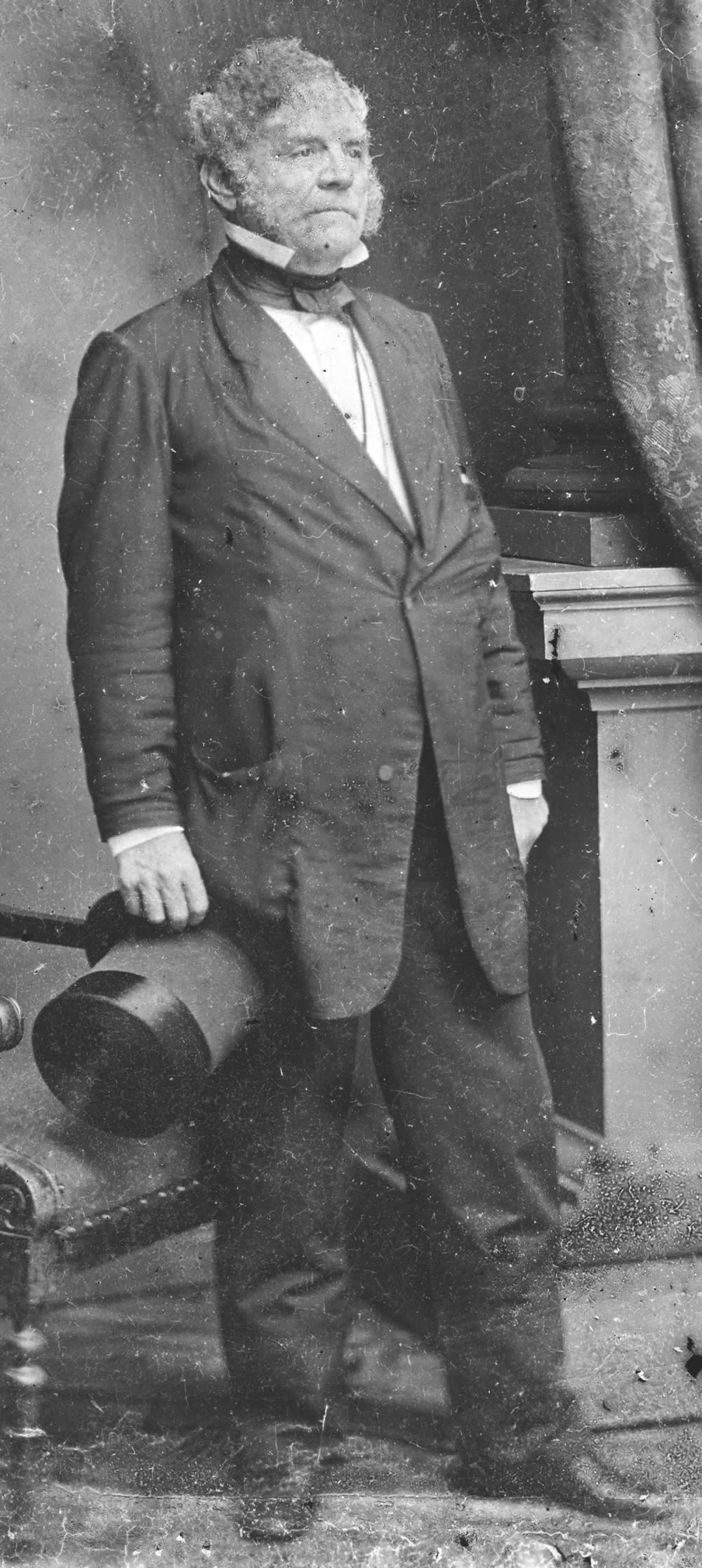
Governor Hicks, although a slaveholder, played an important role in preventing Maryland from seceding in 1861.

Like other border states such as Kentucky and Missouri, Maryland had a population divided over politics as war approached, with supporters of both North and South. The western and northern parts of the state, especially those Marylanders of German origin, held fewer slaves and tended to favor remaining in the Union, while the Tidewater Chesapeake Bay area – the three counties referred to as Southern Maryland which lay south of Washington, D.C.: Calvert, Charles and St. Mary's – with its slave economy, tended to support the Confederacy if not outright secession. After John Brown's raid on Harper's Ferry, Virginia (now in West Virginia), some citizens in slaveholding areas began forming local militias. Of the 1860 population of 687,000, about 60,000 men joined the Union and about 5,000 fought for the Confederacy. The political sentiments of each group generally reflected their economic interests.

The first bloodshed of the Civil War occurred on April 19, 1861, in Baltimore involving Massachusetts troops who were fired on by civilians while marching between railroad stations. After that, Baltimore Mayor George William Brown, Marshal George P. Kane, and former Governor Enoch Louis Lowe requested that Maryland Governor Thomas H. Hicks, a slaveholder from the Eastern Shore, burn the railroad bridges and cut the telegraph lines leading to Baltimore to prevent further troops from entering the state. Hicks reportedly approved this proposal. These actions were addressed in the famous federal court case of Ex parte Merryman.

Maryland remained part of the Union during the United States Civil War, thanks to President Abraham Lincoln's swift action to suppress dissent in the state. The belated assistance of Governor Hicks also played an important role; although initially indecisive, he co-operated with federal officials to stop further violence and prevent a move to secession.

=== Maryland left out of Emancipation Proclamation ===
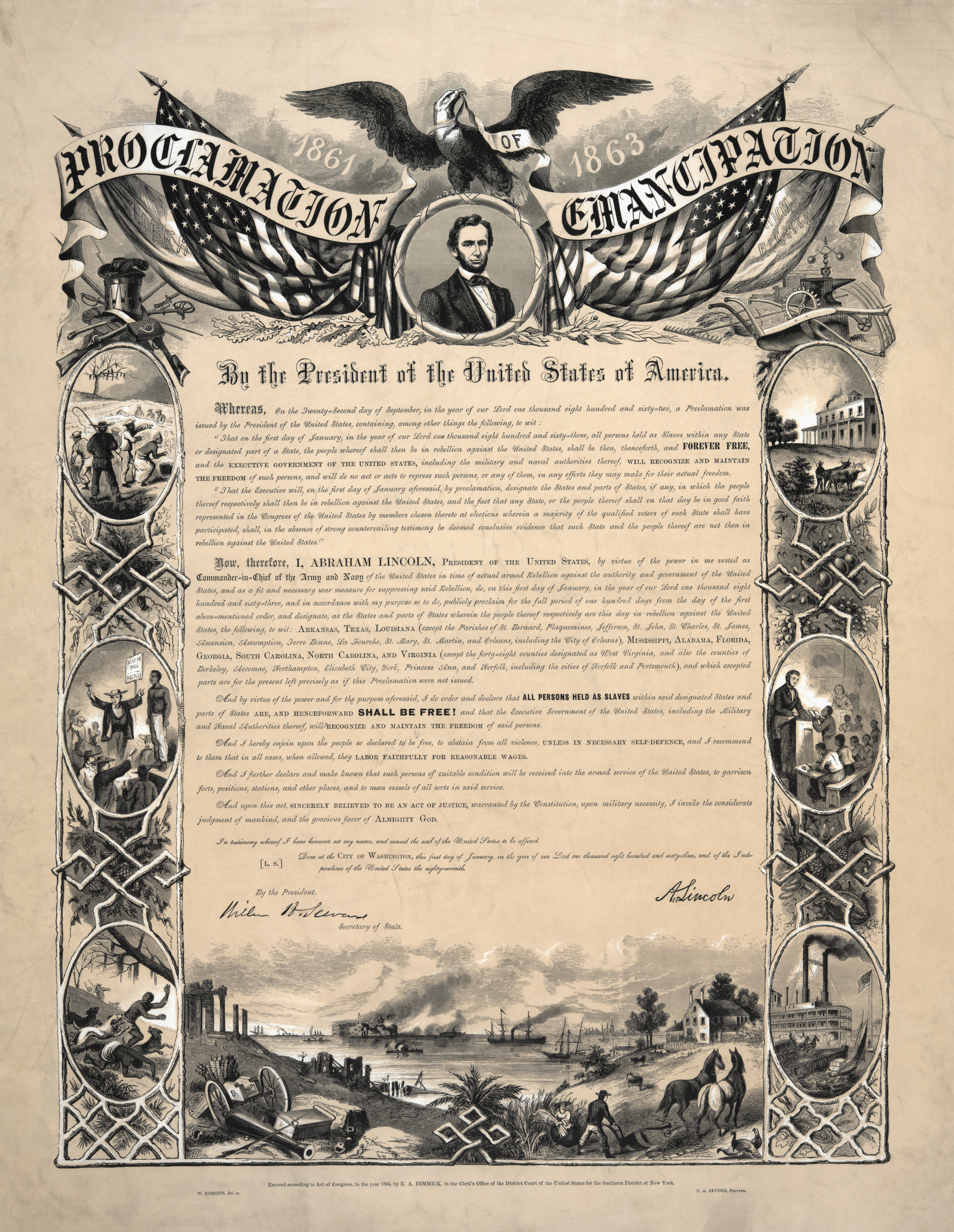
The Emancipation Proclamation of September 22, 1862, freed all slaves in rebel States, but left slavery in Maryland unaffected.

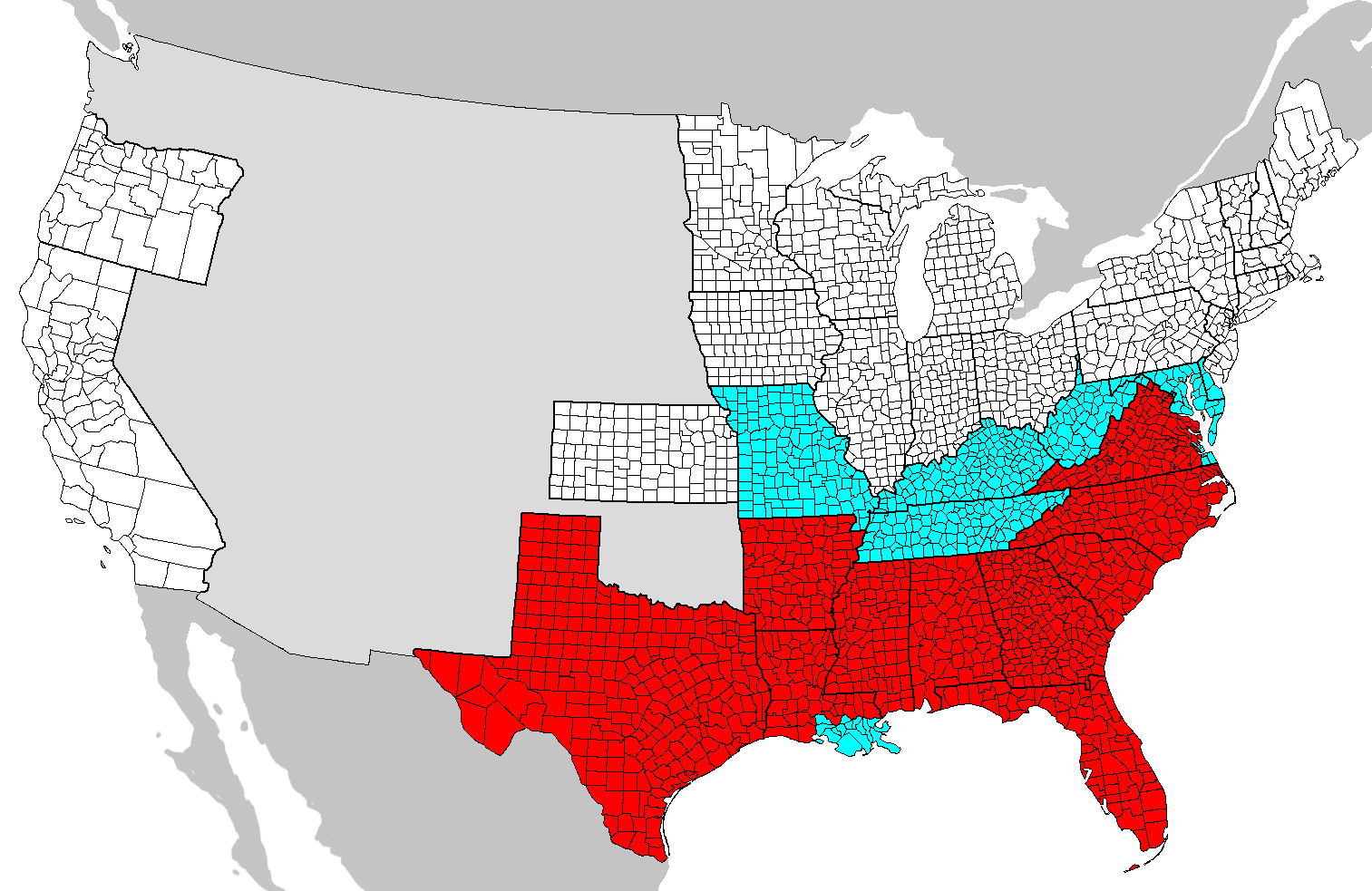
Areas covered by the 1862 Emancipation Proclamation are shown in red. Slave holding areas not covered, including Maryland, are shown in blue.

Emancipation remained by no means a foregone conclusion at the start of the war, though events soon began to move against slaveholding interests in Maryland. On December 16, 1861, a bill was presented to Congress to emancipate enslaved people in Washington, D.C., and in March 1862 Lincoln held talks with Marylanders on the subject of emancipation. Some Marylanders, such as Representative John W. Crisfield, resisted the President, arguing that freedom would be worse for the slaves than slavery. Such arguments became increasingly ineffective as the war progressed.

On April 10, 1862, Congress declared that the Federal government would compensate slaveholders who freed their slaves. Slaves in the District of Columbia were freed on April 16, 1862, and slaveholders were duly compensated. In July 1862 Congress took a major step towards emancipation by passing the Second Confiscation Act, which permitted the Union army to enlist African-American soldiers, and barred the army from recapturing runaway slaves. In the same month Lincoln offered to buy out Maryland slaveholders, offering $300 (~$7,528 in 2025) for each emancipated slave, but Crisfield (unwisely as it turned out) rejected this offer.

On September 17, 1862, General Robert E. Lee's invasion of Maryland was turned back by the Union army at the Battle of Antietam, which was tactically inconclusive but strategically important. It took place near Sharpsburg, Maryland. Five days later, on September 22, encouraged by relative success at Antietam, President Lincoln issued an executive order known as the Emancipation Proclamation, which declared all enslaved people in Southern states to be free. The order went into effect in January 1863, but Maryland, like other border states, was exempted since it had remained loyal to the Union at the outbreak of war.

Maryland remained a slave state, but the tide was turning. In 1863 and 1864 growing numbers of Maryland slaves simply left their plantations to join the Union Army, accepting the promise of military service in return for freedom. One effect of this was to bring slave auctions to an end, as any slave could avoid sale, and win freedom, by simply offering to join the army. In 1863 Crisfield was defeated in local elections by the abolitionist candidate John Creswell, amid allegations of vote-rigging by the Union army. In Somerset County, Maryland, Creswell outpolled Crisfield by a margin of 6,742 votes to 5,482, with Union soldiers effectively deciding the vote in favor of Creswell.

=== The ending of slavery in Maryland ===
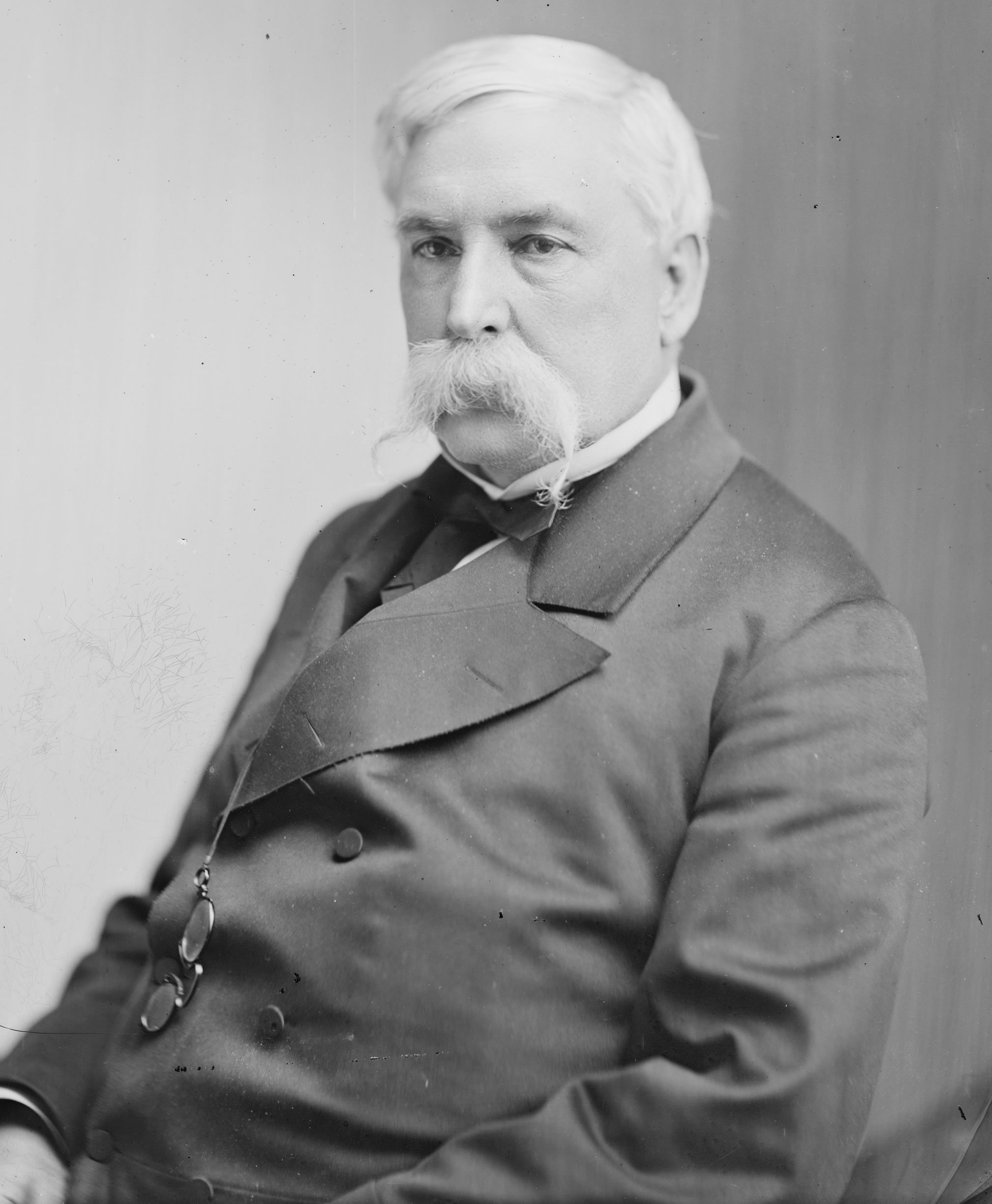
Thomas Swann launched the referendum campaign to end slavery in Maryland in 1863 with a motion for "immediate emancipation" in the state at a special meeting of the Union Party central committee. The motion was seconded by John Pendleton Kennedy, a prominent Maryland politician and author. Photograph taken circa 1865–1880.

The issue of slavery was finally confronted by the new Maryland Constitution of 1864 which the state adopted late in that year. The document, which replaced the Maryland Constitution of 1851, was pressed by Unionists who had secured control of the state, and was framed by a Convention which met at Annapolis in April 1864. Article 24 of the constitution at last outlawed the practice of slavery.

==== Special motion launches campaign to end slavery in the state ====
On December 16, 1863, a special meeting of the Central Committee of the Union Party of Maryland was called on the issue of slavery in the state (the Union Party was the most powerful legalized political party in the state at the time). At the meeting, Thomas Swann, a state politician, put forward a motion calling for the party to work for "Immediate emancipation (of all slaves) in Maryland". John Pendleton Kennedy seconded the motion. Since Kennedy was the former speaker of the Maryland General Assembly, as well as being a respected Maryland author, his support carried enormous weight in the party. A vote was taken and the motion passed. However, the people of Maryland as a whole were by then divided on the issue, and so twelve months of campaigning and lobbying on the issue followed throughout the state. During this effort, Kennedy signed his name to a party pamphlet, calling for "immediate emancipation" of all slaves that was widely circulated.

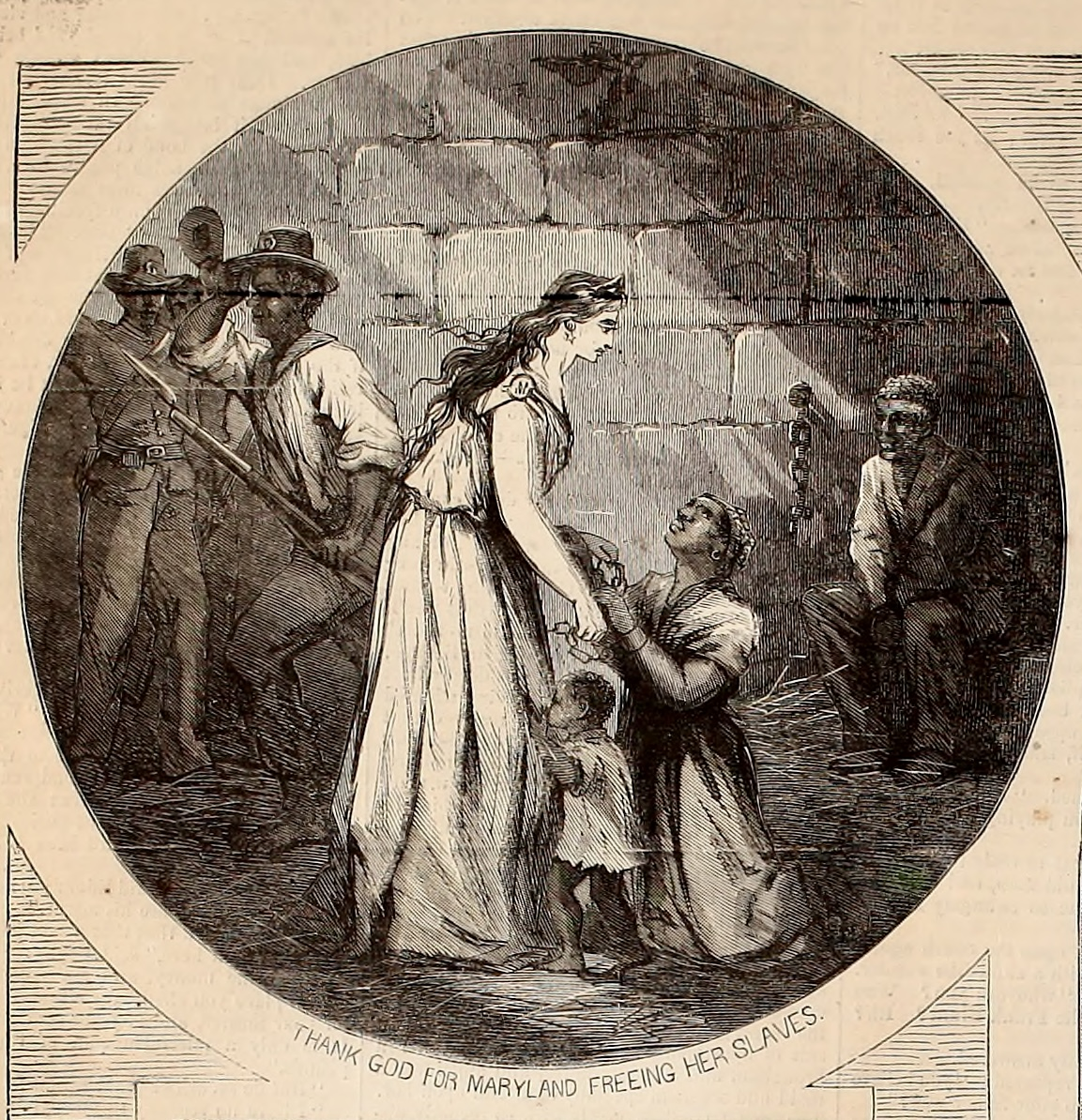
"Thank God for Maryland Freeing Her Slaves" detail from Thanksgiving-Day, November 24, 1864 by Thomas Nast (Harper's Weekly, December 3, 1864)

On November 1, 1864, after a year-long debate, a state referendum was put forth on the slavery question: although tied to the larger referendum on changes to the state constitution, the slavery component was extremely well known and hotly debated. The citizens of Maryland voted to abolish slavery, but only by a 1,000 vote margin, as the southern part of the state was heavily dependent on the slave economy.

==== Details of final vote ====
The constitution was submitted for ratification on October 13, 1864, and was narrowly approved by a vote of 30,174 to 29,799 (50.3% to 49.7%) in a referendum widely characterized by intimidation and fraud. The vote was carried only after Maryland's soldiers' votes were included in the count. Marylanders serving in the Union Army were overwhelmingly in favor (2,633 to 263).

The institution of slavery in Maryland had lasted just over 200 years, since the Assembly had first granted it formal legal status in 1663.

== See also ==
- Escape of 28 enslaved people from Maryland
- African Americans in Maryland
- List of Maryland slave traders
- Atlantic Creole
- Atlantic slave trade
- Chesapeake Colonies
- Children of the plantation
- Colonial South and the Chesapeake
- Female slavery in the United States
- Charlotte Gilchrist
- History of slavery in the United States by state
- Maryland State Colonization Society
- Maryland in the American Civil War
- Province of Maryland
- Republic of Maryland
- Scramble (slave auction)
- Seasoning
- Slavery in the colonial history of the United States
- Tobacco colonies

== General and cited references ==
- Andrews, Matthew Page, History of Maryland, Doubleday, New York (1929).
- Chapelle, Suzanne Ellery Greene, et al. Maryland: A History of Its People Johns Hopkins University Press (1986).
- Ferguson, Niall. Civilization: The Six Killer Apps of Western Power Penguin Books (2012).
- Flint, John E., ed. The Cambridge History of Africa: From c. 1790 to c. 1870 Cambridge University Press (1977).
- Freehling, William W. The Road to Disunion: Volume I: Secessionists at Bay, 1776–1854. Oxford University Press (1990).
- Hall, Richard L., On Afric's Shore: A History of Maryland in Liberia, 1834–1857. The Maryland Center for History and Culture (2004).
- Latrobe, John H. B. Maryland in Liberia: A History of the Colony Planted By the Maryland State Colonization Society Under the Auspices of the State of Maryland, U. S. At Cape Palmas on the South-West Coast of Africa, 1833–1853 (1885). (The Agreement Which Made Maryland in Liberia Independent, p. 125).
- Mintz, Steven, and Kellogg, Susan, Domestic Revolutions: A Social History of American Family Life. New York: The Free Press (1989), p. 31.
- Rhodes, Jason, Somerset County, Maryland: a Brief History.
- Stebbins, Giles B., Facts and Opinions Touching the Real Origin, Character, and Influence of the American Colonization Society: Views of Wilberforce, Clarkson, and Others, published by Jewitt, Proctor, and Worthington (1853).
- Switala, William J., Underground Railroad in Delaware, Maryland, and West Virginia.
- Maryland Colonization Journal published by the Maryland State Colonization Society.
- Discussion on American Slavery: Between George Thompson, Esq., Agent of the British and Foreign Society for the Abolition of Slavery Throughout the World, 17th of June, 1836. Isaac Knapp, 46 Washington Street (1836).
