= Maryland County =

County of Liberia

- County
- Flag

- Location in Liberia
- Coordinates: 4°45′N 7°45′W
- Country: Liberia
- Capital: Harper
- Largest city: Pleebo
- Districts: 7
- Established: 1857
- Named for: Republic of Maryland

Government
  - Superintendent: Cadmael Ghadhanfar Pasquale Grey

Area
  - Total: 2,297 km^{2} (887 sq mi)

Population (2022)
  - Total: 172,202
  - Density: 74.97/km^{2} (194.2/sq mi)
- Time zone: UTC+0 (GMT)
- HDI (2018): 0.455 low · 4th of 15

Maryland County is a county in the southeastern portion of Liberia. One of 15 counties that comprise the first-level of administrative division in the nation, it has two districts. Harper serves as the capital with the area of the county measuring 887 square miles (2,300 km^{2}). As of the 2022 Census, it had a population of 172,202, making it the ninth most populous county in Liberia.

Named after the State of Maryland in the United States, it was an independent country as the Republic of Maryland from 1854 until it joined Liberia in 1857. The most populous city in the county is Pleebo, with 22,963 residents, while Maryland's County Superintendent is Nazarine Tubman. The county is bordered by Grand Kru County to the west and River Gee County to the north. The eastern part of Maryland borders the nation of Ivory Coast (Côte d'Ivoire), separated by the Cavalla River.

== History ==
Maryland was first established as a colony of the Maryland State Colonization Society in 1834, but was not granted independence until 1854. The Maryland Society had played a pivotal role in the formation of the larger American Colonization Society years before. Following a referendum in 1853, the colony declared its independence from the Colonization Society across the Atlantic Ocean and formed the Republic of Maryland. It held the land along the south coast between the Grand Cess and San Pedro Rivers.

In 1856, the Republic of Maryland requested military aid from nearby Liberia in a war with the Grebo and Kru peoples who were resisting the Maryland settlers' efforts to control their trade in slaves. Liberian President Joseph Jenkins Roberts assisted the Marylanders, and a joint military campaign resulted in victory. Following a referendum in February 1857 the Republic of Maryland joined Liberia as Maryland County on 6 April 1857.

During the 1970s, Maryland County was terrorized by ritual killings. The crimes have been regarded as "Liberia's most notorious ritual killing case" due to the number of murders, the involvement of high-ranking government officials, and their subsequent public executions.

In 1984, the territorial boundaries of Maryland County were altered when the Kru Coast Territory, previously administered as part of the county, was detached and merged with the Sasstown Territory of Sinoe County to form Grand Kru County. The reorganization was implemented under People’s Redemption Council (PRC) Decree No. 87, which abolished the two territories and established Grand Kru County with Barclayville as its capital.

== Education ==
Maryland County hosts several of southeastern Liberia’s major educational institutions. The county’s principal institution of higher learning is the William V. S. Tubman University, located in Harper. The university traces its origins to the William V. S. Tubman College of Technology, established in 1978, and was elevated to full university status in 2009.

In addition to the university, the Ministry of Education identifies several key secondary schools in the county, including Pleebo Central High School, Barraken High School, and Cape Palmas High School. These schools serve as major public and mission-based institutions providing junior and senior secondary education across Maryland County.

Maryland County is also the site of the Maryland County Technical and Vocational Educational Institute, part of a national technical and vocational education and training (TVET) expansion program initiated by the Government of Liberia. The institute is intended to provide skills-focused training in trades and technical fields to support workforce development in the county.

=== List of schools ===
The Ministry of Education and county education authorities identify several major secondary and vocational institutions operating in Maryland County. These include:

- William V. S. Tubman University – Harper
- Pleebo Central High School – Pleebo
- Barraken High School – Barraken
- Cape Palmas High School – Harper/Cape Palmas area
- Maryland County Technical and Vocational Educational Institute – Harper District
- J. J. Dossen High School – Harper
- Our Lady of Grace School – Pleebo
- St. Stephen High School – Harper
- Big F Line High School – Pleebo-Sodoken District

These schools form the core of the county’s public, mission, and vocational education network.

== Districts ==
Districts of Maryland County include (2008 population):

- Harper District
- Barrobo District
- Pleebo/Sodeken District
- Karluway District

== Details ==
Farming is the main economic activity in Maryland County, accounting for the employment of approximately 60% of residents. Rice and cassava are the main crops raised in the county. It is roughly estimated that about 98% of the county's population is Christian, 1% Muslim, and 1% Animist.

The flag of Maryland County consists of a drawing of a tree and a lighthouse on a cliff with a small Liberian flag in the upper left corner.

In 2007, WBAL-TV in Baltimore produced a documentary special titled Africa's Maryland, which focused on this region and its cultural roots in the American state of Maryland. After the documentary aired, the state signed a sister state agreement with Bong and Maryland counties.

== Notable people ==
- Mary Brownell (1929–2017), peace activist
