= 1854 Maryland constitutional referendum =

A constitutional referendum was held in Maryland Colony on 29 March 1854. The new constitution was approved by voters and general elections were subsequently held on 15 May, before independence was declared on 8 June.

== Background ==
The Maryland State Colonization Society was established in Maryland in the United States in 1830. The group established the Maryland Colony in Africa on 22 February 1834. After Liberia declared independence in 1847, the desire for independence also grew in Maryland, and the settlers presented a petition to the authorities for a referendum, which was held in January 1853 and approved by 100% of voters.

In February 1854 elections for a Constitutional Council were held. The Council subsequently produced a constitution making the territory a presidential republic with a bicameral legislature. The House of Representatives would have five members serving two year terms and the Senate four members serving four year terms. The presidential term would be two years. Elections would be held under universal suffrage for "colored" men, and only Maryland citizens would be able to own property.
