= Elizabeth Mars Johnson Thomson =

African-American missionary in Liberia

Elizabeth Mars Johnson Thomson (November 1807 – 26 April 1864) was an African-American missionary in Liberia, "a major figure in Liberian education and religion."

== Early life ==
Elizabeth Mars was born in Connecticut, the daughter of free black parents who were born in slavery. She attended the African Sunday School in Hartford, Connecticut.

== Career ==
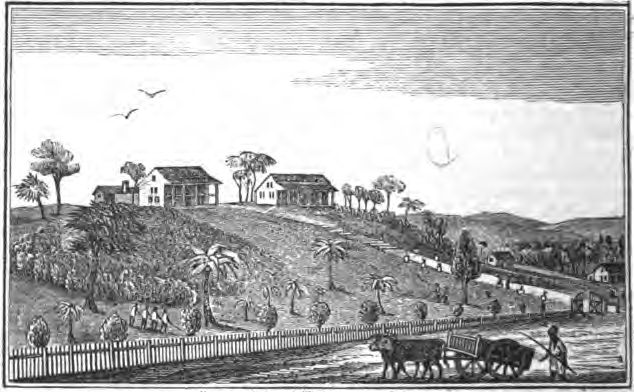
Cape Palmas mission, c. 1840, when Elizabeth Mars Johnson Thomson was teaching there

In 1830 Elizabeth Mars Johnson and her husband volunteered as missionaries for Liberia. They trained at the African Mission School in Hartford; by 1834 they were in Liberia. Elizabeth and her second husband established a Sunday school at Monrovia and Elizabeth taught at the school at Cape Palmas from 1835 until 1845, under the authority of the Episcopal Mission Board. She took a furlough journey back to the United States, and then returned to Liberia, where she continued teaching for many years. Her school at Mount Vaughan in Cape Palmas was burned down in 1856 during an outbreak of violence. She went back to work after the school was rebuilt, until she experienced declining health and left the classroom in 1862.

== Personal life ==
Elizabeth Mars Johnson Thomson was married and widowed twice, and had at least two children who died before she did. She married William Johnson in Connecticut in about 1830; he died soon after their arrival in Liberia, along with their infant son. She remarried to James Madison Thomson, who was born in Demerara (British Guiana) and educated in England; he died in 1838. A daughter died in an epidemic in 1855. Elizabeth Mars Johnson Thomson died in 1864, aged 57 years, in Liberia.
