= 1857 Maryland annexation referendum =

A referendum on annexation by Liberia was held in the Republic of Maryland on 24 February 1857. All voters voted in favor, and an agreement with Liberia was signed on 28 February. On 6 April 1857 the Liberian Legislature accepted Maryland into the republic.

== Background ==
Whilst neighboring Liberia had become independent in 1847, Maryland remained a colony for a further seven years. Following a 1853 referendum, Maryland became a separate independent state on 8 June 1854.

In December 1856 Maryland became involved in a war against the native population. Liberian troops arrived to assist in February 1857, by which time Maryland could no longer see a future as an independent state. Demands were put to the legislature for a referendum on integration into Liberia
