= Barrobo District =

District of Liberia

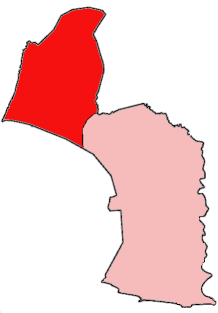
Location of Barrobo District in Maryland County

Barrobo District is a district of Liberia, one of the three located in Maryland County.

Barrobo is the largest of the various Grebo sub-tribes in Maryland County, Republic of Liberia. In the days of tribal wars, they fought surrounding tribes to secure a large portion of land. Their military strength in those days enabled them to wipe out the entire tribe of Gbaylo. The land previously occupied by the Gbaylo tribe is currently a property of the Barrobo people. To control their warlike nature, President Edwin Barclay of Liberia built a military barracks among them. The soldiers of Camp King used suppression, hard labor, and intimidation to keep them in check. Besides, they were subjected to smaller tribes in the administrative arrangement of the Liberian central government. First, they were part of Webbo District. When Grand Gedeh County was established and Webbo became part of Grand Gedeh, the Barrobo tribe was subjected to the smaller tribe of Boah. The most prominent paramount chiefs during the chieftaincy period were Peter Brooks of Feloken and Sunday Karmanue of Rock Town. On 18 September 1980, the Liberian legislature passed an act creating Barrobo as a statutory district, with Paramount Chief John Togba becoming the first District Superintendent. Since then, September 18 has been celebrated annually by the citizens of the district.

In June 2024, a major bridge collapsed due to heavy rainfall, which caused several challenges to the residents of the Barrobo District.
