= 1853 Maryland independence referendum =

An independence referendum was held in the Maryland Colony on 31 January 1853. Only 122 people voted in the referendum, all in favor of independence.

== Background ==
The Maryland State Colonization Society was established in Maryland in the United States in 1830. The group established the Maryland Colony in Africa on 22 February 1834. After Liberia declared independence in 1847, the desire for independence also grew in Maryland, and the settlers presented a petition to the authorities for a referendum.

== Results ==
Choice	Votes	%
For	122	100
Against	0	0
Invalid/blank votes		–
Total	122	100
Source: Direct Democracy

== Aftermath ==
Following the referendum, elections were held for a Constitutional Council in February 1854, a new constitution was approved in a referendum in March 1854, and Maryland declared independence as the Republic of Maryland on 8 June 1854.
