= Cape Palmas =

Headland in Liberia

Coordinates: 4°22′34″N 7°43′01″W

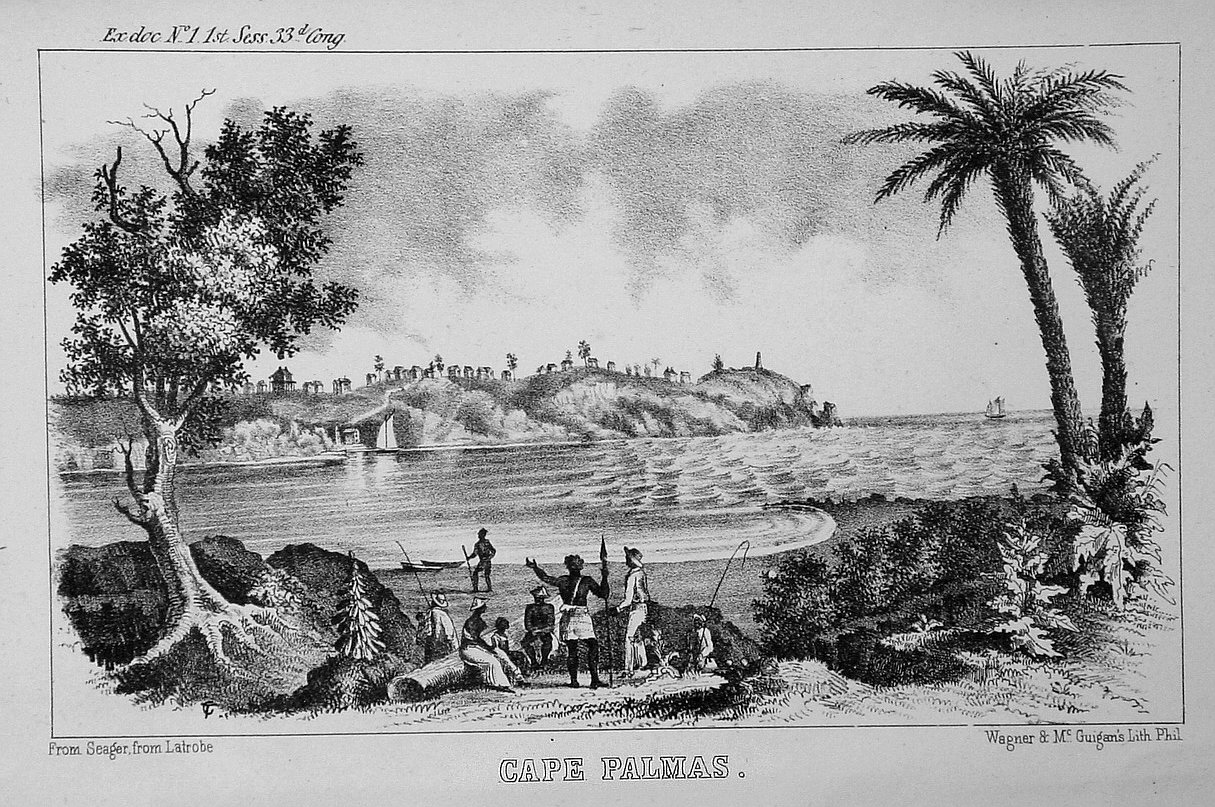
An etching of Cape Palmas in 1853.

Cape Palmas is a headland on the extreme southeast end of the coast of Liberia, Africa, at the extreme southwest corner of the northern half of the continent. The Cape itself consists of a small, rocky peninsula connected to the mainland by a sandy isthmus. Immediately to the west of the peninsula is the estuary of the Hoffman River. Approximately 21 km (15 mi) further along the coast to the east, the Cavalla River empties into the sea, marking the border between Liberia and the Côte d'Ivoire. It marks the western limit of the Gulf of Guinea, according to the International Hydrographic Organization (IHO).

Approached from the sea, there are several landmarks at the cape. Offshore from the estuary of the Hoffman lies the small, oblong shape of Russwurm Island, which was named after the first black governor of Maryland In Africa (later Republic of Maryland), John Brown Russwurm. This island is connected to the peninsula by a breakwater. There is also a lighthouse warning of the numerous shoals in the surrounding sea area. Clearly visible from offshore is a white building with an enormous golden orb on the roof, this being the masonic lodge hall located in the city of Harper, Liberia.

== Origin of the name ==
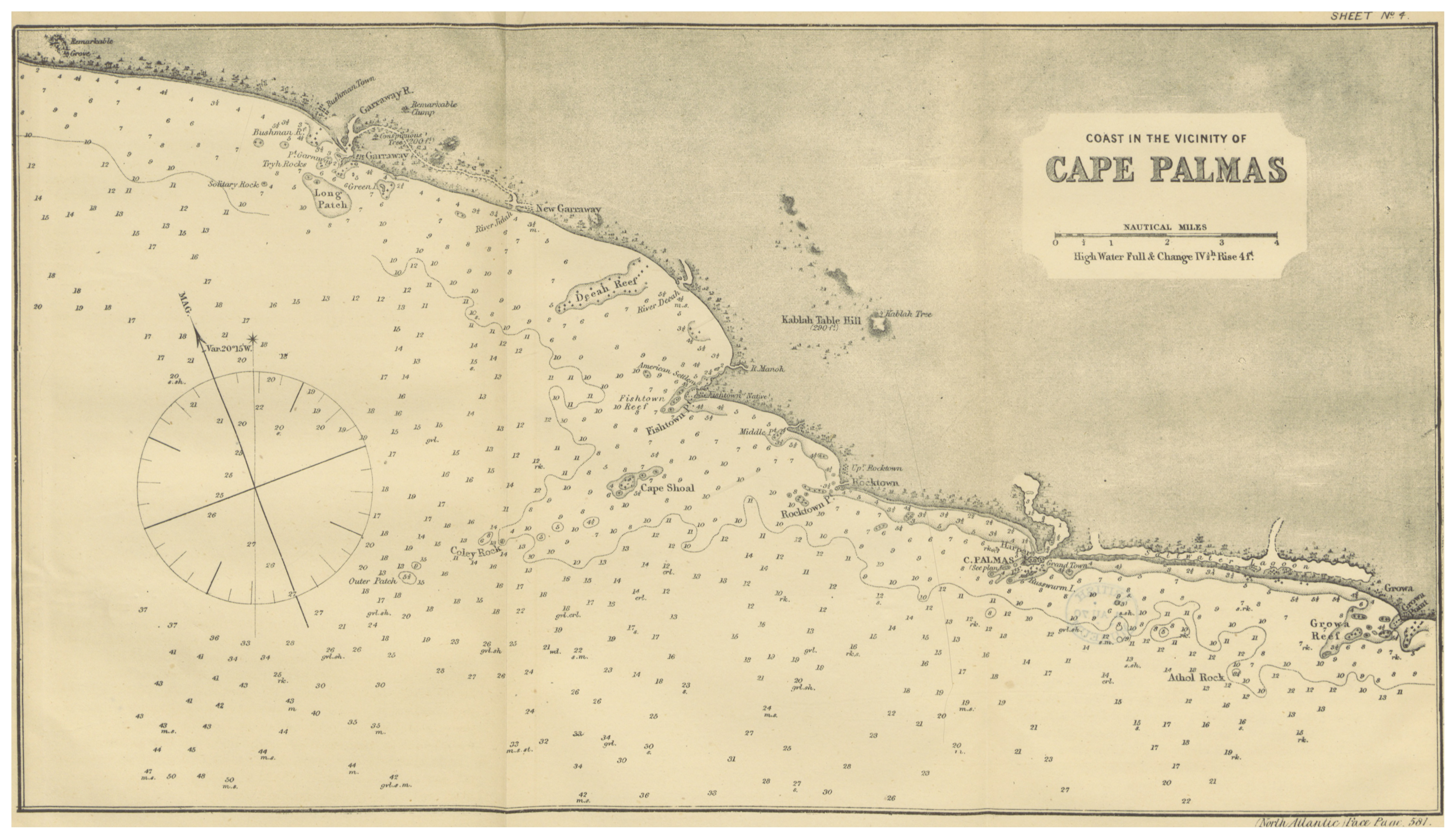
The Coast in the Vicinity of Cape Palmas (1869)

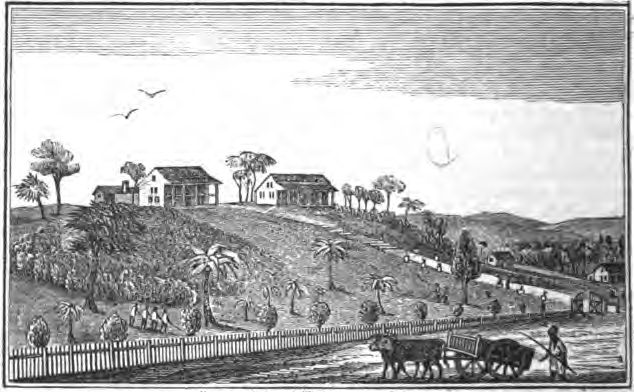
Mission circa 1840

In 1458, Prince Henry the Navigator of Portugal sent his captain Diogo Gomes (1440–1482) on a voyage of discovery and trade that took him and his crew as far south down the coast of West Africa as the mouth of the cape and estuary, which marks the point where the direction of the coastline of West Africa ceases to have any southerly component, but turns definitively to the east, beginning the Gulf of Guinea. Gomes named this geographic feature Cabo das Palmas, i.e. "Cape of the Palms", which was later semi-Anglicized to Cape Palmas. The river was named Rio das Palmas, later to be called the Hoffman River. The name Cape Palmas (while Liberia was still known to Europeans as the Malaguetta Coast) first appeared on various maps of Africa in Latin and later numerous European languages. The earliest map of Africa with the name Cape Palmas is Cantino planisphere completed in 1502.

== History ==
In December 1831, the Maryland state legislature appropriated US$10,000 for 26 years to transport free blacks and ex-slaves from the United States to Africa, and the Maryland State Colonization Society was established for this purpose. American-born Episcopal missionary teacher Elizabeth Mars Johnson Thomson taught at Cape Palmas from 1835 until 1862, and died at Cape Palmas in 1864.

Originally a branch of the American Colonization Society that founded Liberia in 1822, Maryland State Colonization Society decided to establish a new settlement of its own that could accommodate its emigrants and named it Maryland In Africa on February 12, 1834. With Cape Palmas at its center, the colony was granted statehood on February 2, 1841, and then independence on May 29, 1854. On March 18, 1857, the state of Maryland was annexed as a part of the Republic of Liberia, after signing an annexation treaty with the Republic of Liberia.

== City of Harper ==
The city of Harper, Liberia (established 1835 by the Maryland State Colonization Society) extends to the northeast inland along the estuary of the Hoffman, providing a small harbor; the Hoffman Station settlement is on the right bank. The name Cape Palmas is generalized to indicate the entire surrounding region of Maryland County. It is also frequently applied in the vernacular as being virtually synonymous with the county seat, Harper.
