= Grand Cess =

Town in Liberia

- Location in Liberia
- Coordinates: 4°32′N 8°4′W
- Country: Liberia
- County: Grand Kru County

Grand Cess is a town in Grand Kru County, Liberia.
