= List of rivers of Africa =

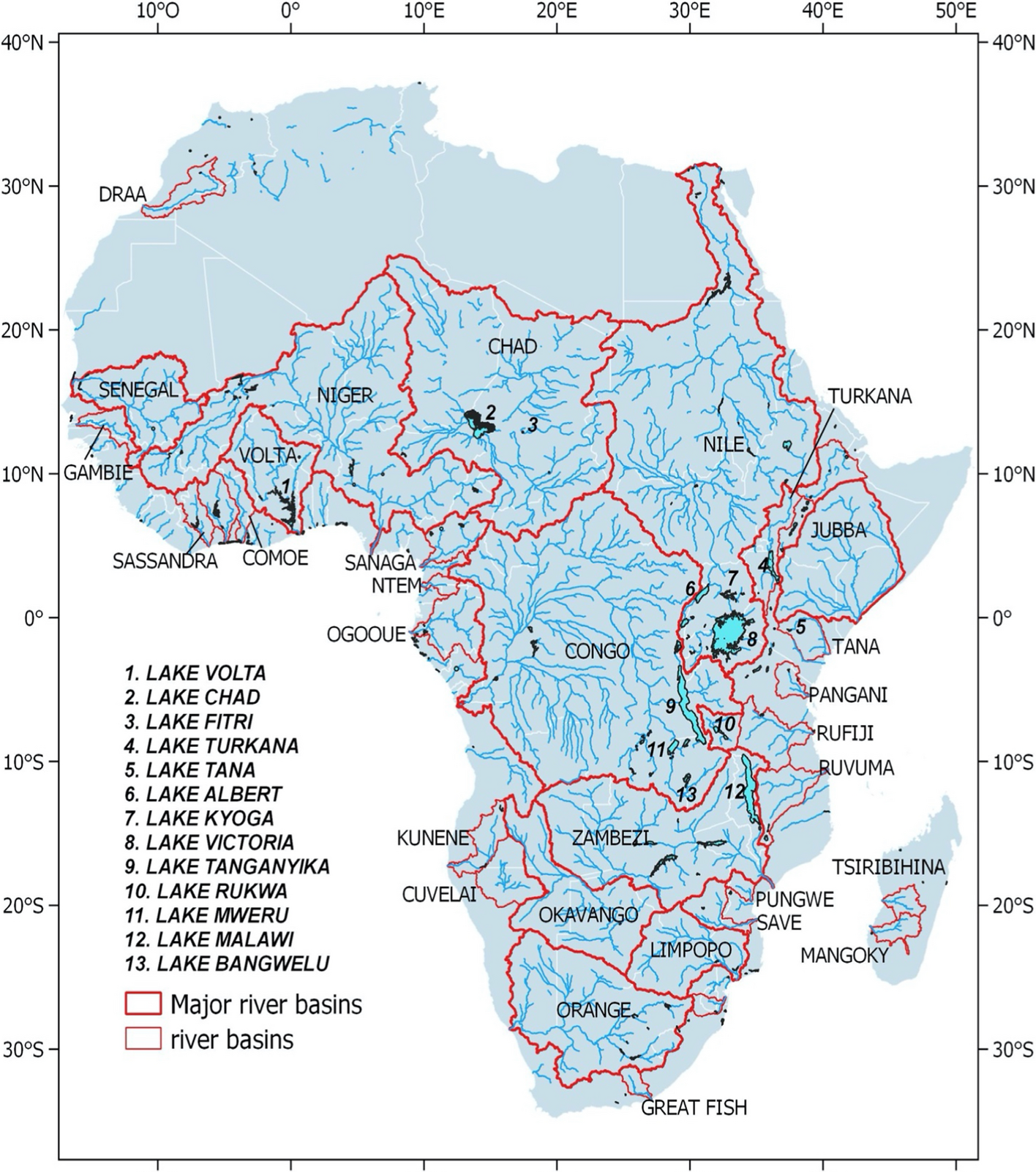
Location of river basins and lakes in Africa

This is a list of rivers in Africa.

The African continent hosts some of the largest freshwater systems worldwide including the Nile and the Congo River.

See below each river's article for its tributaries, drainage areas, etc

== Southern Africa ==
- Cuanza - Angola
- Great Fish River - South Africa
- Great Kei River - South Africa

- Black Kei River - South Africa
- White Kei River - South Africa

- Groot River(s) - South Africa
  - Groot River (Western Cape)
  - Groot River (Southern Cape)
  - Groot River (Eastern Cape)
  - another name for the Orange River - South Africa, Lesotho, Namibia
- Gamtoos River - South Africa
- Ihosy River - Madagascar
- Jukskei River - South Africa
- Kafue River - Zambia
- Kowie River - South Africa
- Kuiseb - Namibia
- Kunene - Angola (as Cunene), Namibia
- Kwando - Namibia, also known as Linyanti and Chobe in places
- Limpopo - Mozambique, South Africa, Zimbabwe, Botswana
- Luangwa River - Zambia
- Mania River - Madagascar
- Maputo River - South Africa, Eswatini, Mozambique
- Molopo - Botswana, South Africa
- Mooi River (Tugela) - South Africa
- Mthatha River - South Africa
- Okavango - Botswana, Namibia, Angola (as "Cubango")
- Onilahy River - Madagascar
- Orange - South Africa, Lesotho, Namibia

- Caledon - South Africa, Lesotho
- Vaal - South Africa
- Fish - Namibia

- Shangani River - Zimbabwe
- Swakop River - Namibia
- Tugela - South Africa
- Umfolozi River - South Africa

- Black Umfolozi River - South Africa
- White Umfolozi River - South Africa

- Umgeni River - South Africa
- Umkomazi River - South Africa
- Zambezi - Angola, Zambia, Namibia, Zimbabwe, Mozambique
- Gairezi - Zimbabwe, Mozambique

== Central Africa ==
- Chari - Central African Republic, Chad, Cameroon
  - Logone - Central African Republic, Cameroon
- Kagera River - Burundi, Rwanda, Tanzania, Uganda
- Congo - Angola, Democratic Republic of the Congo, Republic of the Congo
  - Ebola River - Democratic Republic of the Congo
  - Kasai - Angola, Democratic Republic of the Congo, Republic of the Congo
    - Kwango - Angola, Democratic Republic of the Congo
    - Sankuru - Democratic Republic of the Congo
  - Lualaba - Democratic Republic of the Congo
  - Lomami - Democratic Republic of the Congo
  - Ubangi - Democratic Republic of Congo, Republic of Congo, Central African Republic
  - Lulonga - Democratic Republic of the Congo
    - Lopori - Democratic Republic of the Congo
    - Maringa - Democratic Republic of the Congo
  - Tshuapa - Democratic Republic of the Congo
- Uele - Democratic Republic of the Congo
- Nyabarongo River - Rwanda
- Rurubu River - Burundi
- Ruzizi River - Democratic Republic of the Congo, Rwanda, Burundi
- Mbomou - Central Africa Republic
- Wouri - Cameroon
- Xufexufe River - São Tomé and Príncipe

== East Africa ==
- Tana - Kenya
- Athi - Kenya
- Mara - Kenya and Tanzania
- Ewaso - Nyiro-Kenya
- Sondu - Mirio-Kenya
- Ruvoma - Tanzania
- Rufiji - Tanzania
- Ruvu - Tanzania
- Shebelle - Somalia and Ethiopia
- Jubba - Somalia and Ethiopia
- Nile - Uganda, Ethiopia, South Sudan, Sudan and Egypt
- Sezibwa - Uganda
- Maputo - Tanzania
- Awash - Ethiopia and Somalia
- Genale - Ethiopia and Somalia
- Dawa - Ethiopia and Somalia
- Omo - Ethiopia and Somalia
- Ruzizi - Rwanda and Burundi
- Ruvubu - Rwanda and Burundi
- Akanyaru - Rwanda and Burundi
- Nyabarongo - Rwanda and Burundi
- Victoria Nile - Uganda
- Albert Nile - Uganda
- Achwa - Uganda, South Sudan
- Kafu - Uganda

== West Africa ==
- Aba - Nigeria
- Bandama River
- Benin - Nigeria
- Benue - Nigeria
- Cavalla River - Liberia
- Ethiope River - Nigeria
- Gambia - The Gambia, Senegal, Guinea
- Imo - Nigeria
- Kaduna - Nigeria
- Kolenté (Great Scarcies) - Guinea, Sierra Leone
- Little Scarcies (Kaba) - Guinea, Sierra Leone
- Moa - Guinea, Sierra Leone
- Niger - Nigeria, Benin, Niger, Mali, Guinea
- Oba - Nigeria
- Ose - Nigeria
- Oyan - Nigeria
- Osun - Nigeria
- Oteghelli - Nigeria
- Oueme - Benin
- Rokel - Sierra Leone
- Saint Paul - Liberia
- Sanaga - Cameroon
- Sankarani - Mali
- Senegal - Senegal, Mauritania, Mali
- Sewa River
- Volta - Ghana, Burkina Faso
- Cross River (Nigeria) - Nigeria
- Nuon River - Liberia, Ivory Coast
- Cestos River - Liberia
- Yobe River - Nigeria
- Densu River - Ghana
- Ayensu River - Ghana
- Black Volta - Ghana
- Birim River - Ghana
- Sene River - Ghana
- Afram River - Ghana
- White Volta - Ghana
- Red Volta - Ghana
- Ofin River - Ghana
- Oti River - Ghana
- Amisa River - Ghana
- Ora River -Ghana
- Ankobra River - Ghana
- Kakum River - Ghana
- Tano River - Ghana
- Bia River - Ghana, Cote d'Ivoire
- Nakwa River - Ghana
- Pru River - Ghana
- Anum River - Ghana
- Tain River - Ghana

== North Africa ==
- Nile - Egypt, Sudan, Ethiopia. 6,650 km
  - Atbarah River - Sudan, Ethiopia
  - Blue Nile - Sudan, Ethiopia
  - Didessa River - Ethiopia
  - Nile - Egypt
  - Bahr el Zeraf - South Sudan
  - White Nile - Sudan, South Sudan, Rwanda, Tanzania, Uganda
- Bou Regreg - Morocco. 240 km
- Draa River - Morocco. 1100 km
- Moulouya River - Morocco. 520 km
- Oum Er-Rbia River - Morocco. 555 km
- Sebou River - Morocco. 496 km
- Chelif River - Algeria. 725 km

== Rivers of Africa by discharge ==
Largest primary rivers of Africa by discharge (>100 m^{3}/s):
River	Average discharge (m^{3}/s) at mouth
001 Congo	41,400
002 Niger	8,630
003 Ogooué	5,890
004 Zambezi	4,200
005 Nile	2,830
006 Sanaga	2,730
007 Cross	2,647
008 Kwanza	1,944
009 Rovuma	1,773
010 Betsiboka	1,407
011 Wouri	1,389
012 Tsiribihina	1,316
013 Volta	1,290
014 Rufiji	1,268
015 Chari	1,200
016 Cavally	1,192
017 Konkouré	1,170
018 St Paul	1,125
019 Benin	1,084
020 Sofia	1,062
021 Moa	1,044
022 Kouilou	1,000

(continues)
River	Average discharge (m^{3}/s) at mouth
022 Kouilou	1,000
023 Sassandra	978
024 L. Scarcies	967
025 Sewa	952
026 St John	864
027 Maningory	776
028 Lúrio	741
029 Ntem	718
030 Omo	660
031 Nyanga	651
032 Mangoky	597
033 Sénégal	596
034 Nyong	595
035 Loffa	590
036 Bandama	583
037 Cestos	581
038 Mahavavy	578
039 Corubal	555
040 Rokel	547
041 Mbini	515
042 Pungwe	492
043 Mahajamba	483
044 Jong	477
045 Save	437
046 Kolenté	424
047 Licungo	421
048 Mitimele	416
049 Mangoro	386
050 Imo	384
051 Gambia	374

(continues)
River	Average discharge (m^{3}/s) at mouth
052 Mano	370
053 Orange	369
054 Cuvo	369
055 Mebridege	329
056 Jubba	328
057 Rianila	325
058 Ogun	320
059 Búzi	315
060 Limpopo	313
061 Fatala	312
062 Okavango	297
063 Sehnkwehn	296
064 Kogon	289
065 Pra	288
066 Farmington	288
067 Simianona	285
068 Komo	273
069 Komoé	264
070 Ouémé	254
071 Mungo	245
072 Mananara	244
073 Tana	243
074 Manambolo	240
075 Messalo	235
076 Ivondro	234
077 Geba	232
078 Antainambalana	226
079 Cunene	222
080 Catumbela	216
081 Maevarano	203

(continues)
River	Average discharge (m^{3}/s) at mouth
082 Longa	200
083 Kwa Ibo	195
084 Osun	193
085 Tinguilinta	192
086 Mananjary	191
087 Timbo	187
088 Onilahy	183
089 Maningoza	173
090 Tano	172
091 Analanjirofo	172
092 Dugbe	169
093 Mananara	166
094 Gbangbaia	166
095 Onive	164
096 Sibiti	162
097 Incomáti	160
098 Ankobra	158
099 Awash	152
100 Manambaho	151
101 Mzimvubu	151
102 Ligonha	150
103 Rungwa	149
104 Dibamba	148
105 Matandu	147
106 Ramboué	142
107 Sebou	137
108 Manampatrana	137
109 Momba	136
110 Sambirano	135
111 Akpakorum	133

(continues)
River	Average discharge (m^{3}/s) at mouth
112 Sinoe	133
113 Mbewmburu	126
114 Mono	125
115 Kerio	123
116 Chiloango	121
117 Douengui	119
118 Tugela	119
119 Maputo	117
120 Pangani	117
121 Coporolo	106
122 Rbia	105
123 Great Kwa	105
124 Mémé	103
125 Forécariah	100

(10 to 100 m^{3}/s)
River	Average discharge (m^{3}/s) at mouth
Katuma	98
Cacheu	94
Grand Cess	93
Galana	90
Casamance	86
Tensift	74
Songwe	70
Ruvu	68
Great Kei	67
San Pedro	67
Wami	61
Gourits	43
Moulouya	41
Sous	35
Medjerda	29
Great Fish	26
Komadougou	25
Drâa	25
Bou Regreg	24
Chelif	24
Sundays	16

== See also ==
- Geography of Africa
- List of rivers of Europe
- List of rivers of Asia
- List of rivers of the Americas
- List of rivers of Oceania
- Lists of rivers
- List of dry rivers in Africa
