= List of rivers of Guinea =

This is a list of rivers in Guinea. This list is arranged by drainage basin, with respective tributaries indented under each larger stream's name.

== Atlantic Ocean ==
Guinea is the origin of the Niger River, one of the most important river systems in West Africa.

- Sénégal River (Senegal)
  - Falémé River
  - Bafing River
  - Bakoy River
    - Kokoro River
- Gambia River
  - Koulountou River
- Geba River
  - Corubal River (Koliba River) (Tominé River)
- Kogon River (Compony River)
- Nunez River
- Kitali River (Kapatchez River) (Katako River)
- Pongo River
  - Fatala River
- Konkouré River
  - Kakrima River
- Soumba River (Dubréka River)
- Soumbouya River
- Morebaya River
- Forécariah River
- Mellacoree River
- Kolenté River (Great Scarcies River)
- Little Scarcies River
  - Mongo River
- Moa River
  - Meli River
- Mano River
- Lofa River
  - Lawa River (Africa)
- Saint Paul River
  - Nianda River
- Saint John River
- Cestos River
- Cavalla River (Cavally River)
- Sassandra River (Côte d'Ivoire)
  - Gouan River (Bafing River)
  - Férédougouba River (Bagbe River)
- Niger River
  - Sankarani River
    - Ouassoulou River (Bale River)
    - Dion River
    - Gbanhala River
  - Fié River
  - Tinkisso River
    - Bouka River
  - Milo River
    - Baoulé River
  - Niandan River
    - Kouya River
  - Mafou River

== See also ==
- Geography of Guinea
