= List of rivers of Sierra Leone =

This is a list of rivers in Sierra Leone. This list is arranged by drainage basin, with respective tributaries indented under each larger stream's name.

== Atlantic Ocean ==
- Great Scarcies River (Kolenté River)
- Little Scarcies River (Kaba River)
  - Mabole River
  - Mongo River
  - Lolo River
- Sierra Leone River
  - Rokel River (Seli River)
  - Bankasoka River (called Port Loko Creek in the tidal part)
- Ribi River
- Bumpe River
- Kagboro Creek
- Sherbro River
  - Bagru River
  - Jong River (Taia River)
    - Pampana River
    - Teye River
- Kittam River
  - Sewa River
    - Bagbe River
    - Bafi River
  - Waanje River
- Moa River
  - Meli River
- Mano River
  - Mahoi River
  - Moro River
