= Synodontis thysi =

Conservation status
- Least Concern (IUCN 3.1)

Scientific classification
- Domain: Eukaryota
- Kingdom: Animalia
- Phylum: Chordata
- Class: Actinopterygii
- Order: Siluriformes
- Family: Mochokidae
- Genus: Synodontis
- Species: S. thysi

Binomial name
- Synodontis thysi Poll, 1971

Species of fish

Synodontis thysi is a species of upside-down catfish native to Guinea and Sierra Leone where it is found in the Little Scarcies, Jong, Rokel, Kolenté and Konkouré Rivers. This species grows to a length of 22.9 centimetres (9.0 in) SL.
