= List of rivers of Liberia =

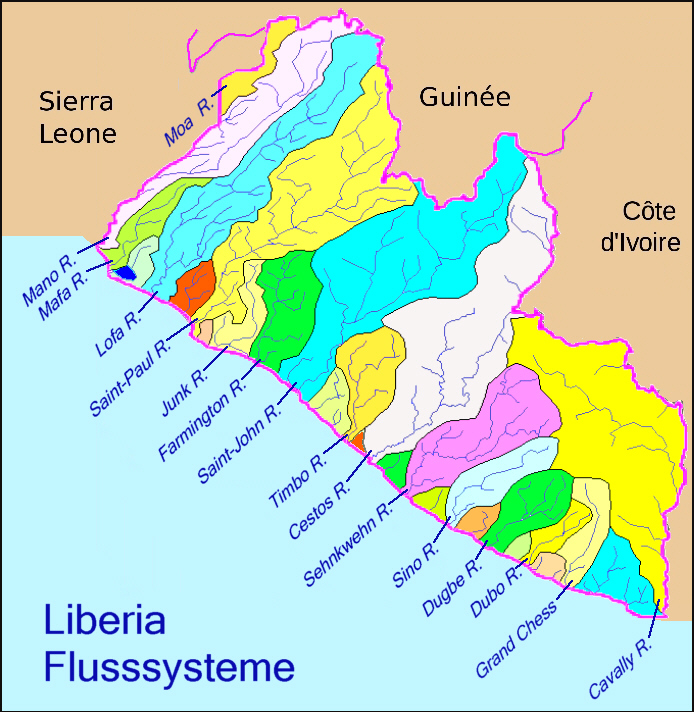
A map of Liberia's major rivers and their drainage systems

This is a list of rivers in Liberia. This list is arranged by drainage basin, with respective tributaries indented under each larger stream's name.

== Atlantic Ocean ==
- Moa River (Sierra Leone)
  - Magowi River
- Mano River (Gbeya River)
  - Moro River
- Mafa River
- Lofa River
  - Mahe River
  - Lawa River
- Saint Paul River
  - Nianda River
  - Via River
- Mesurado River
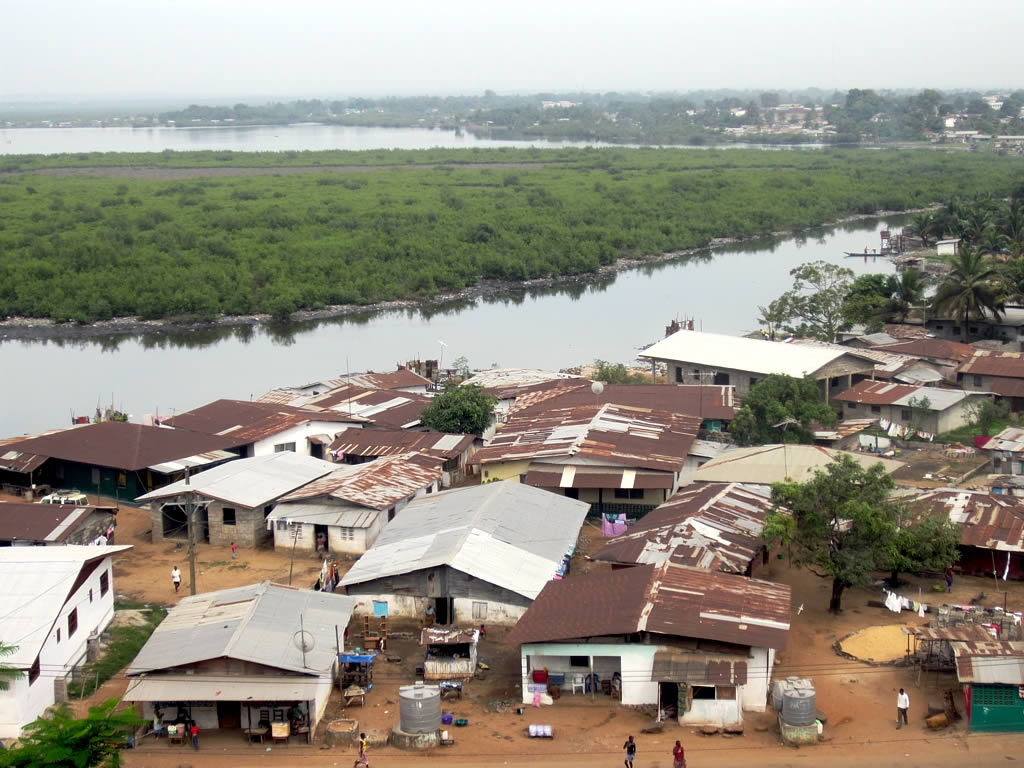
  The Mesurado River in Monrovia.
- Junk River
  - Du River
- Farmington River
- Saint John River
  - Mani River
- Timbo River
- Cestos River
  - Gwen Creek
  - Nuon River
- Sehnkwehn River
- Sinoe River
- Dugbe River
- Dubo River
- Grand Cess River
- Cavalla River (Cavally River)
  - Dube River (Douobe River)
