= Kagbeli Island =

Island in Port Loko District, Sierra Leone

Coordinates: 8°32′45″N 12°56′35″W

Kagbeli Island (also Hagbeli Island) is an island in Port Loko District, Northern Province, Sierra Leone. There are four populated settlements on the island: Makose and Makenke on the north coast with Makose and Malai on the south coast.

The island is located where the Rokel River enters the Sierra Leone River estuary.
