= Rivercess =

Rivercess may refer to:

- Rivercess County, Liberia
- River Cess, capital of Rivercess County
