= Kinira River =

The Tyinirha River may identify either of two small rivers of Africa:

- Tyinirha River, a tributary of the Mzimvubu River in Eastern Cape province, South Africa that formed one of the former boundaries of East Griqualand in the 1860s and 70s.
- Kinira River, a stream in Nigeria
