= Liberian nationality law =

Aliens and Nationality Law

Parliament of Liberia
- Long title: An Act Adopting a New Aliens and Nationality Law
- Passed by: Government of Liberia
- Passed: 15 May 1973
- Status: Current legislation

Liberian nationality law is regulated by the Constitution of Liberia, as amended; the Aliens and Nationality Law, and its revisions; and various international agreements to which the country is a signatory. These laws determine who is, or is eligible to be, a national of Liberia. The legal means to acquire nationality, formal legal membership in a nation, differ from the domestic relationship of rights and obligations between a national and the nation, known as citizenship. Nationality describes the relationship of an individual to the state under international law, whereas citizenship is the domestic relationship of an individual within the nation. Liberian nationality is based on descent from a person who is "Negro", regardless of whether they were born on Liberian soil, jus soli, or abroad to Liberian parents, jus sanguinis. The Negro clause was inserted from the founding of the colony as a refuge for free people of color, and later former slaves, to prevent economically powerful communities from obtaining political power. It can be granted to persons with an affiliation to the country, or to a permanent resident who has lived in the country for a given period of time through naturalization.

== Acquisition ==
Nationality is acquired in Liberia at birth, or later in life through naturalization.

=== By birth ===
The primary means of obtaining nationality in Liberia is birth on Liberian soil (jus soli), or by descent from a Liberian national (jus sanguinis). Nationality is restricted to those who are Negroes and no provision is made for foundlings or orphans discovered in the territory with unknown parentage. The Liberian Aliens and Nationality Law 1973 is in conflict with the 1986 Constitution. For example, the constitution does not contain provisions for birth on Liberian soil and requires descent from a Liberian, but the nationality statute provides for children who are born in the territory whose parents do not have diplomatic immunity. Another discrepancy is that the constitution states nationality can be acquired through a mother or father, but the nationality statute restricts acquisition for children born abroad to fathers. Further, under the nationality law children born abroad to a Liberian mother and foreign father are required to naturalize to obtain nationality, but the constitution states only that they must renounce any other nationality they might have upon reaching the age of majority. Similarly, fathers of children born abroad under the Aliens and Nationality Law are required to have lived in Liberia before the birth of the child and the child is required to reside in Liberia at majority, but no such provisions are part of the constitution. Human rights organizations have formally commented upon the discriminatory nature of the nationality statutes as well as the lack of provisions regarding Liberia's international legal obligations under treaties and conventions the country has executed.

=== By naturalization ===
Naturalization in Liberia is restricted to people defined as "Negroes" To naturalize, an applicant must make a declaration of intent to naturalize before a Circuit Court, followed by the actual petition for naturalization which must be filed between the second and third anniversary dates of the declaration of intent. General provisions for naturalization include that the applicant has attained legal majority (age twenty-one) and is of good and moral character; that they reject anarchy and believe in the principles of the constitution; and that they can demonstrate that they have established at least a two-year residency in the country. At his discretion, the president may waive the residency requirements. Applicants are required to renounce prior nationalities and swear an Oath of Allegiance to uphold the laws and constitution of Liberia and defend the republic. Minor children may be included in the naturalization petition if they were born outside of the country and their father naturalizes; however, not if they were born in Liberia and not if their mother naturalizes. There are no provisions for children who are adopted by Liberians to obtain nationality in the Aliens and Nationality Law, nor are there special provisions for the naturalization of spouses of nationals.

== Loss of nationality ==
Liberians are allowed to renounce their nationality, provided the renunciation is officially made to a Liberian diplomatic or consular officer in a foreign state. Liberians of origin can be denaturalized for applying for nationality in another state; for serving in another country's military forces or serving another nation in an official capacity, without the authorization of the president; or for voting in an election of another nation. For naturalized persons, denaturalization can occur if they reside outside Liberia for an extended period of time; if they commit a crime against state security or disloyal acts; or if they obtained nationality through fraud, false representation, or concealment. The implications of denaturalization can extend to minor children, as the law provides that they are also denaturalized if their father loses nationality.

== Dual nationality ==
In 1973, the Aliens and Nationality Law prohibited dual nationality except in limited circumstances, but there was no specific ban against having multiple nationalities in the constitution. There was also no specific provision allowing dual nationality. The constitution and nationality law conflicted, as the constitution states that a child can hold dual nationality until majority, at which time they had to renounce other affiliations; whereas, the nationality statute stated that if the person had taken a voluntary action such as behaving as a national of another state or swearing an oath of allegiance to another state, or applying for naturalization in a foreign state, they could be deprived of Liberian status. So for example, no voluntary action was required of a woman who lost her nationality automatically upon marriage to a foreigner under previous statutes requiring her to take her husband's nationality, or when she was restored nationality under the 1973 Aliens and Nationality Law. She was protected from losing her Liberian status unless she specifically renounced her Liberian nationality by Article 22.3. Similarly, a child born abroad in a country that automatically confers nationality based on jus soli to two Liberian parents would not have to renounce their foreign status.

In July 2022, President George Weah signed an amendment to the Aliens and Nationality Law allowing for dual nationalities. This allows individuals who previously lost their Liberian citizenship after acquiring citizenship in another country to reclaim it. Liberian citizens with dual nationalities, however, are prohibited from doing some things, such as holding a number of elected public offices.

== History ==
=== Pre-colonial period (1461–1821) ===
In 1461, Pedro de Sintra, a Portuguese navigator, reached the Pepper Coast (Portuguese: costa da malagueta). Seven years later, Fernão Gomes, a Lisbon merchant, was granted a contract by Afonso V of Portugal to explore the West African coastline from Sierra Leone to Cameroon. He was given the monopoly to the Guinea trade and colonization, as well as the trade for the malagueta pepper spice. In 1474, when Gomes' contract expired, the Guinea trade was turned over to Afonso's son João. Under João's administration, all foreigners were prohibited from engaging in the Guinea trade upon penalty of death. Primarily, the Pepper Coast was used as a refueling and provisioning outpost, but slaves were also purchased there for transport to Elmina Castle. By 1600, the Dutch had replaced the Portuguese traders along the Pepper Coast, which they called the Grein Kust, (Grain Coast), using the medieval nomenclature, graine de paradis (grain of paradise), for the malagueta pepper. In the seventeenth century, the Dutch established a trading post at Cape Mount, and English, French, and German traders began to operate in the area. Trading posts were established by Europeans at Cestos and Grand Cess.

Around the same time, African peoples who had settled in the region included tribes and villages associated with inter-related ethnolinguistic groups, the Bassa, Kru, and Grebo people; the Kpelle, Loma and Vai people; and the Gola people. These groups did not create unified states, but traditionally lived in autonomous villages, characterized by patrilineal descent which engaged in fishing and farming. Most of these tribes were involved in the slave trade, bringing slaves from the interior to the coast for sale to Europeans. In 1787, British abolitionists established a settlement, Freetown, near Cape Mesurado, for the resettlement of freedmen from Britain and her colonies. The idea fueled plans in the United States to establish a similar settlement. Between 1815 and 1821 numerous attempts to resettle free people of color on the Pepper Coast failed and negotiations for suitable land were unsuccessful. In 1820, the American Colonization Society drafted a constitution based on the American legal system to establish a colony administered and governed by the Society. They sent two agents, Robert F. Stockton and Eli Ayers, in 1821 to negotiate with local chieftains to secure a place for colonization. Reaching an agreement with all of the headmen of the tribes in the vicinity, Stockton and Ayers acquired Cape Mesurado and land on Dozoa Island in the cape for settlement.

=== Colony of Liberia (1822–1847) ===
The Colony of Liberia was established on Dozoa in January 1822 as the local inhabitants did not allow them on the mainland. After negotiations to settle the dispute, they were able to relocate to Cape Mesurado in April. Additional colonization organizations sent freedman to Liberia. In 1822 a settlement was established at Edina by the Colonization Society of New York City of New York, which also founded a colony at Bassa Cove in conjunction with the Young Men's Colonization Society of Pennsylvania, in 1834. That year, the Maryland Colonization Society settled colonists at Cape Palmas. In 1837 a settlement was located at Sinoe by the Mississippi Colonization Society. In each case, negotiations to acquire land were difficult as the Africans did not want to allow the colonists to curtail the slave trade in their territory, as it was the main driver of their economies. There continued to be divisions between the indigenous people and the colonists, particularly over the issue of slaving and what local chiefs perceived as the colonists' attempts to undermine their authority. The administrative policies of the Colonization Society, focused on the cultural assimilation of the native population and their conversion to Christianity.

In 1839, the colonists of the various coastal settlements decided to form the Liberian Commonwealth in an effort to unify their policies and provide for mutual protection. They drafted a Constitution, which defined citizens as people of color emigrating from the United States and its territories. Rights were granted only to the Americo-Liberian people, but liberated slaves captured from slaving vessels could be naturalized. Liberated slaves, referred to as Congos or recaptives, were from various places in Africa and were brought to Liberia and Sierra Leone and freed. Because of a large influx of liberated slaves, the colonists passed the Apprenticeship Act of 1846, which allowed recaptives to naturalize after completing an apprenticeship to teach them a trade or domestic service, and educate them. European merchants, many of whom were involved in the slave trade, refused to recognize the authority of the commonwealth to control commerce in its territory. Meanwhile, the neighboring British authorities in Sierra Leone adopted the position that Liberia was not a sovereign nation, but instead managed by a foreign corporation which lacked jurisdictional authority. To rectify the situation, the legislature of the commonwealth asked for Liberia's independence from the American Colonization Society in 1845. In 1847, the Board of Directors of the Society agreed and instructed the legislature to amend their constitution to take over governmental administration.

=== Post-independence (1847–present) ===
On 26 July 1847, independence was declared and subsequently a constitution drafted for the new republic. Under the terms of the 1847 Constitution, indigenous persons were subjects of the new republic but not citizens. Citizenship was limited to non-aboriginal "Negroes" and the franchise was based upon property ownership. Between 1858 and 1874, explorers from Monrovia traveled from the coast to the interior of Liberia making treaties with the aboriginal people for friendship and trade and negotiate the purchase of land to extend the territory of the republic. The policies continued to extend to aboriginal persons the ability to join the republic, if they assimilated to the values of the government. Liberia's first Naturalization Act was passed on 27 January 1876, and provided for foreigners who were of good character and who had lived in the territory for three years to be admitted as nationals if they renounced other loyalties and took an Oath of Allegiance to Liberia. To prevent European acquisition of territory in Liberia during the Scramble for Africa (1880–1890), the Republic built a series of forts to protect a chain of settlements which had been established after their earlier explorations. Nonetheless, both Britain and France, annexed land in the territory, attaching it to Sierra Leone and Niger, respectively.

From 1904, the government shifted its policies toward the indigenous people from assimilation to indirect rule, allowing the Liberian Frontier Force and chieftains of the interior latitude to administer the territory beyond Monrovia. In 1908, a new Naturalization Law was drafted adding provisions that applicants must be "Negro", at least twenty-one years old, and lack a criminal record. Under the Law of 8 February 1922, nationality in Liberia was derived by Negro persons as long as, they were a child born in Liberia, whose parent did not have diplomatic immunity; a child born abroad to a Liberian father, who was temporarily abroad and would be returning to Liberia; the wife of a Liberian; and naturalized persons, which included their wives and minor children. Non-Negroes were prohibited from becoming nationals of the territory and women who married foreigners lost their Liberian status, but could repatriate upon termination of the marriage. Under the 1922 Law dual nationality was prohibited. A Supreme Court decision in Williams v. Young and an opinion issued by the Attorney General of Liberia on 18 December 1922, determined that denaturalization of a woman by marriage to a foreigner was unconstitutional and that her status could not be changed without her consent.

From the 1930s, international pressure was exerted upon the Liberian Government to reform its policies regarding its indigenous people. Finally in 1945, their status was changed from being non-citizen nationals of the republic and the Liberian Constitution was amended to extend the franchise to all African males, upon reaching their majority, who paid their hut tax. Though a new Naturalization law had been passed in 1938, the various laws concerning nationality were not codified until the passage of the Aliens and Nationality Law in 1956, but the basic provisions did not change. (Note: Despite the ruling in 1922 that a woman could not lose her nationality through marriage to a foreigner without her consent, the 1956 legislation specified in Section "115. Liberian woman who marries alien.—A Liberian woman who marries a foreigner takes the nationality of her husband.) In 1960, the policy of indirect rule was abandoned and integration of the indigenous people began, eliminating the remaining differences in citizenship status between the aboriginal and the Americo-Liberian people.

The 1956 Aliens and Nationality Law was repealed and replaced by a statute of the same name in 1973. Under its terms only a "Negro" person who was born in Liberia or a person born abroad to a father of African descent who was Liberian of origin and has lived in Liberia, could acquire nationality at birth. Children born abroad were required to reside in Liberia or to take an Oath of Allegiance upon reaching majority to retain their Liberian status. Children born abroad to a Liberian mother and alien father were permitted to naturalize, if their father naturalized. Provisions for the acquisition of nationality through marriage were changed, indicating that all foreign spouses must meet naturalization requirements. Women who had previously automatically lost their nationality because of marriage with a foreigner were declared to be Liberian, as long as they had not voluntarily acted to acquire other nationality.

In 1979, an amendment to the constitution was proposed to allow persons who were not of African descent to acquire nationality in Liberia. Before it was passed, in 1980, the constitution was suspended by a coup d'état. A new constitution was drafted in 1984 and went into force in 1986. Under Article 28 of the new constitution, children born abroad could equally acquire nationality from their mothers; however, they were required to renounce any other nationalities at majority. An inconsistency of law was created with this provision as the 1973 Aliens and Nationality Law was not amended. Though Liberia promised to amend its nationality statutes and remove provisions that were inconsistent with human rights treaties in 2011, the 1973 law remains in force. A draft constitution was reviewed in 2015 to remove the racial clauses and allow for dual nationality, but it was unsuccessful. In 2019, the Supreme Court ruled in Alvin Teage Jalloh v Olubanke King-Akerele that automatically depriving a citizen of Liberian status because they had acquired dual nationality was unconstitutional as Section 22.2 of the Aliens and Nationality Law abridged constitutional protections for Due process. Though the legislature again attempted to amend the constitution, a procedural issue halted a proposed 2020 referendum.

In July 2022, President Weah signed an amendment to the Alien and Nationality Law allowing dual citizenship for Liberians specifically of "Negro descent". Under this new law, Liberian citizens with dual nationality are prevented from holding some public offices.
