= Cestos =

Settlement in Liberia

Cestos is a settlement in Rivercess County in central Liberia. Located along the Cestos River, it lay at the heart of a heavily contested region during the First Liberian Civil War: the National Patriotic Front of Liberia derived vast amounts of resources from Cestos and other parts of Rivercess County. A small battle was fought between the NPFL and ECOMOG peacekeepers in early May 1993: after peacekeepers captured Buchanan, NPFL strength in Rivercess County was weakened because its fighters feared going near the county due to its convenient riverine and marine transportation. Therefore, when ECOMOG approached Cestos, it faced little fighting and reported no resistance within the city itself. Since the end of the Second Liberian Civil War, transportation in the region has been improved by private concerns: in the early 2010s, reports of possible gold mines prompted a mining company to construct a road from Cestos to the Central RiverCess District town of Zammi.
