= Bearwor District =

District of Liberia

Coordinates: 5.594°N 9.304°W

Bearwor District is one of 8 districts of Rivercess County, Liberia. As of 2008, the population was 3,854.
