= Morweh District =

- District
- Country: Liberia
- County: Rivercess County

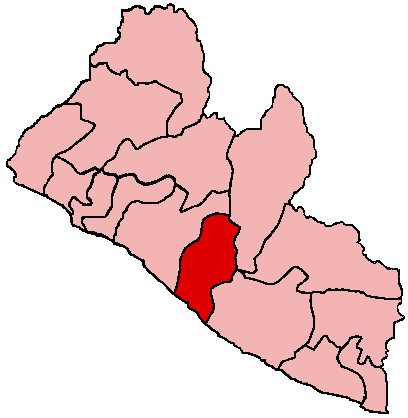
Location of Rivercess County

Morweh District is a district of Rivercess County, Liberia. It was one of the county's two original districts.
