= Muhlenberg Mission =

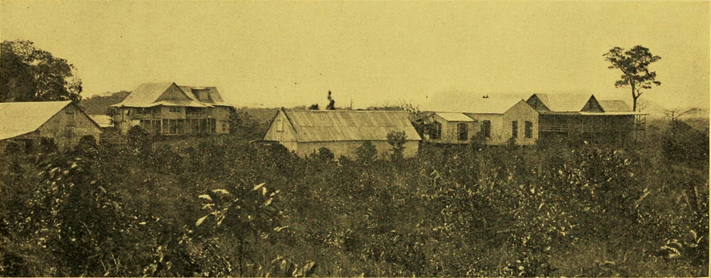
- Muhlenberg Mission, in a 1911 publication
- Formation: 1860
- Founder: Rev. Morris Officer
- Founded at: 30 miles (48 km) from Monrovia
- Type: Christian mission
- Purpose: evangelism, education, farming
- Location: Liberia
- Products: coffee beans
- Parent organization: Evangelical Lutheran General Synod of the United States of America

Muhlenberg Mission was a Christian mission on the West Africa coast in Liberia. It was run by the Lutheran Mission of Africa for the Evangelical Lutheran General Synod of the United States of America. The mission was an outlet for the products of its coffee farms.

Established in 1860 under the supervision of Rev. Morris Officer, the locality then was dense forest. Roads had to be cut, ground had to be cleared, and buildings erected. The nucleus of the work was 40 boys and girls taken from a captive slave ship, formed into a school. Banana and coffee trees were planted, the latter becoming the great industry of the mission, and a source of revenue for its sustenance.

== Location ==
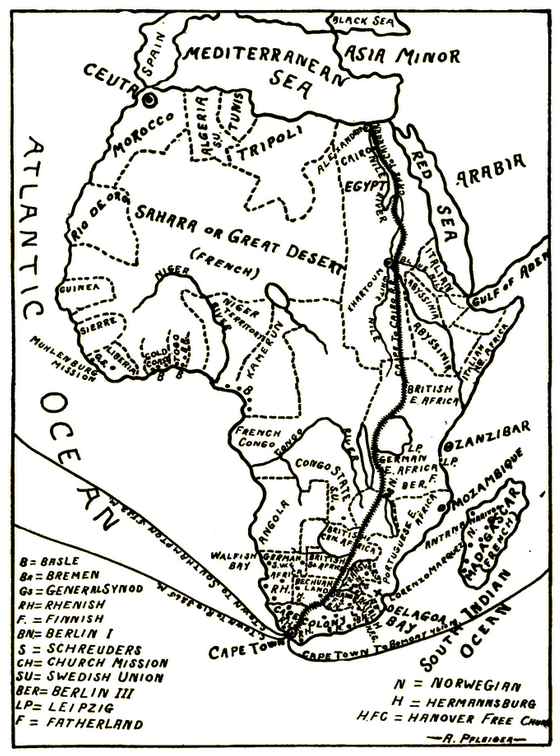
Muhlenberg Mission, Liberia on map of Africa

The Muhlenberg Mission was situated on a hill, up the Saint Paul River, 30 miles (48 km) from Monrovia, the capital. In the 1876s, this tract of ground was covered by a dense forest inhabited by wild animals. The mission station turned it into a farm, with 100 acres (40 ha) of trees, which furnished the Lutheran Board in America from 16,000–25,000 pounds (7,300–11,300 kg) of coffee each year.

== Early history ==
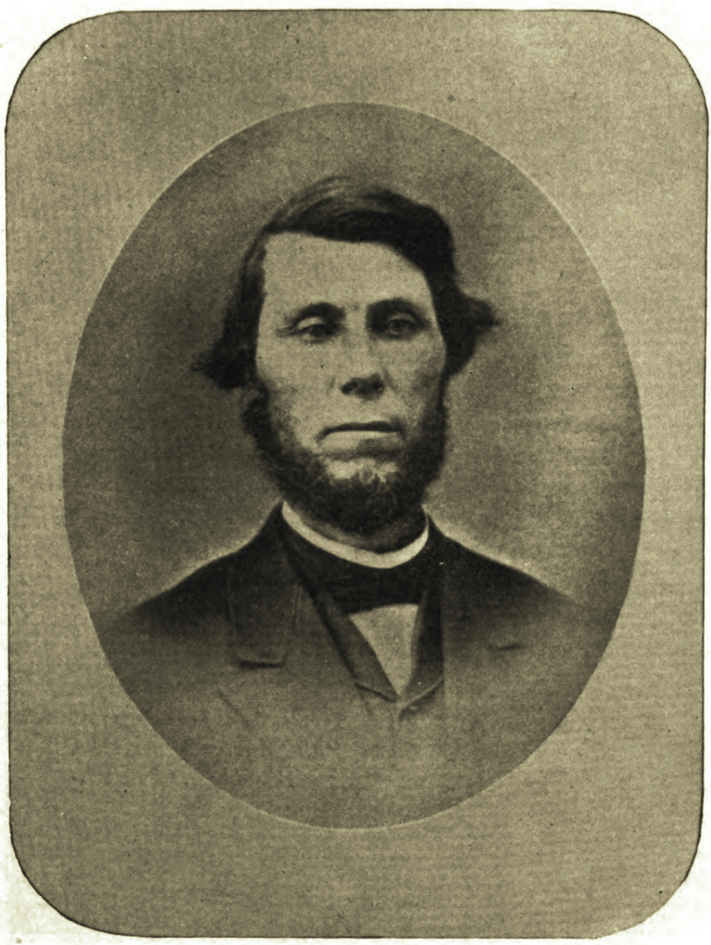
Rev. Morris Officer

This mission was undertaken at the prayerful entreaty of Rev. Morris Officer, who visited individuals, congregations and synods, in behalf of what he believed to be his God-given work in Africa. When he ascended (1860) St. Paul River, he saw native towns everywhere. Around these Liberian settlements were thousands for whose conversion little was being done. Rev. Officer set himself to the task of securing a tract of land and erecting a log house, opening a school for Liberian children. The tropical climate, however, soon forced him home. Others followed; they, too, had to leave after a short sojourn.

Beginning in 1860, the General Synod began conducting a mission. An industrial department was the special feature of the work in this field. The authorities claimed that it was utterly useless to attempt the education and Christianization of the people without, at the same time, teaching them agriculture, or the mechanical arts, so that they could of themselves be able to meet and supply the wants created by a Christian colonialization.

The mission owned nearly 500 acres (200 ha) of land, on part of which were planted 60,000 coffee trees. Almost 1,000 acres (400 ha) adjoining the mission were owned and cultivated by members of the congregation in the Muhlenberg Mission.

An effort was made to provide for the industrial training of the girls.

== Clement Irons ==
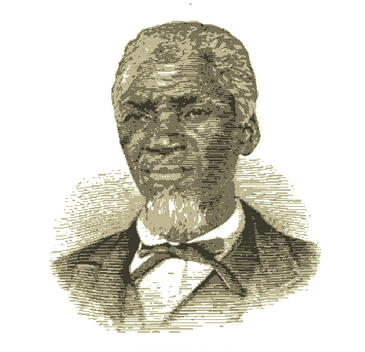
Clement Irons

Clement Irons, a slave in Charleston, S.C., was a good mechanic; his master hired him out for that kind of labor. By working after shop hours he earned $1000, with which he purchased his own and his wife's freedom, and the two together made sufficient money to secure the freedom of their four children. This they accomplished shortly before President Lincoln's emancipation proclamation was issued. After the war some of his liberated brethren, aided by benevolent white men, bought US$25,000 worth of tools, machinery, and so forth, and took them to Liberia, to be set up there, with Irons as the foreman of the enterprise.

He arrived in Liberia in the barque Azor circa 1875, when 50 years of age.

The venture did not prove a success, and Irons was left stranded at Monrovia with the whole outfit on his hands, worth in Liberia at that time less than old iron, because there was no one to whom to sell it. Subsequently, Irons presented what was left to the mission, and he was employed as foreman of the industrial establishment in the mission. This position he occupied for many years, teaching the young men blacksmithing, carpentry, and machine work.

He was president of the company which built the small steamboat that for six or eight years ran on the St. Paul River, and which brought about a great change in the traffic on that river. He accumulated some property, and lived in retirement in a comfortable home of his own, and younger men whom he trained in the mission took his place.

== Rev. and Mrs. Day ==
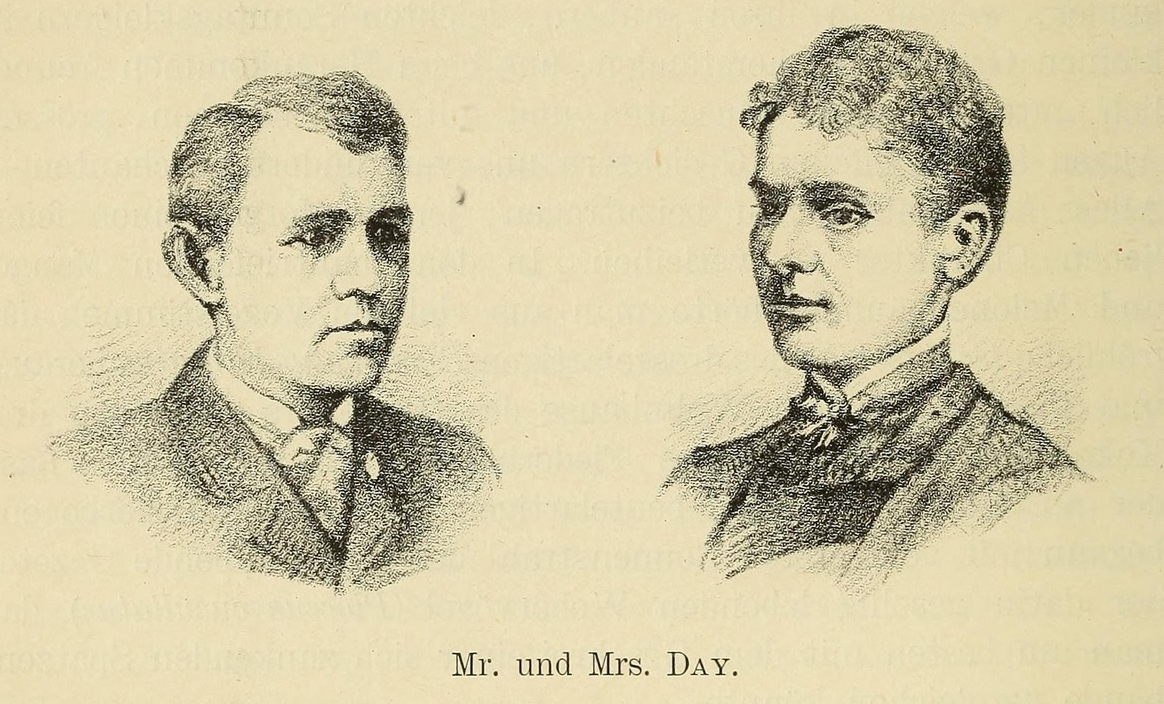
Rev. and Mrs. Day

Rev. David A. Day was, until his death (1897), the general superintendent of the mission. In one of Dr. Day's reports, it was stated that he could baptize half the population of the whole region, if he were so minded, but the great work was to educate and develop the converts in the new life. He estimated that about 3,000 people were under the Christian influence of the mission.

Rev. Day and his wife, Emma V. Day, bore the titles, "the heroes of the Muhlenberg Mission". This cannot be fully appreciated unless bearing in mind that of the 30 laborers sent from the U.S. to Muhlenberg, Dr. and Mrs. Day remained 23 and 21 years respectively, while the others failed in health and returned. Feeling that theirs was a divinely appointed mission, the two labored to make their work in the jungle prosper.

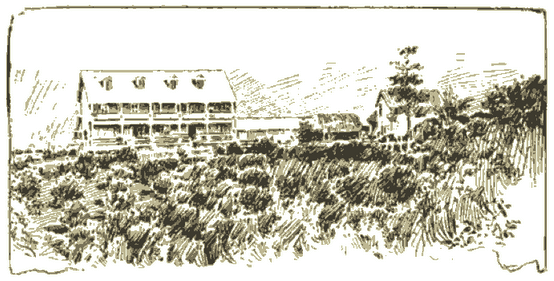
Coffee farm

In October 1894, Rev. Day recorded that the mission sent to Monrovia 9,000 pounds (4,100 kg) of coffee for shipment by the first steamer. It sent by the Liberia 6,000 pounds (2,700 kg) and by a German steamer a few weeks earlier 10,000 pounds (4,500 kg). He thought it ought to be worth in the U.S. not less than US$.25 a pound, which would go a long way toward meeting the expenses of the mission for the year.

Dr. Day's superintendence, was, in 1895, in buildings, chapel, and workshops, US$7,600; in machinery, tools, oxen, and carts, US$1,915; in mission farm and improvements, US$1,000; in 50,000 coffee trees at US$1.25 a piece, US$62,500; making a grand total of US$73,045, a large proportion of which was credited to the profits which accrued from the industry of the mission. In the year 1895, the mission raised between US$4,000 and US$5,000 worth of coffee, which was exported to the U.S., having besides raised all the crops necessary for food for the mission, which had been for some years entirely self-sustaining.

When Mrs. Day finally was compelled to return to the U.S. to regain her health, Dr. Day remained, being assured by his wife that Africa needed him more than she did. She died in 1894.

Rev. Day stood by his duty until he, too, was in poor health, and while friends anxiously awaited his home-coming, he suffered on shipboard, saying in his delirium: "Close up the ranks, close up the ranks,” and dying November 1897, before reaching the U.S. Rev. and Mrs. Day were buried at Selinsgrove, Pennsylvania.

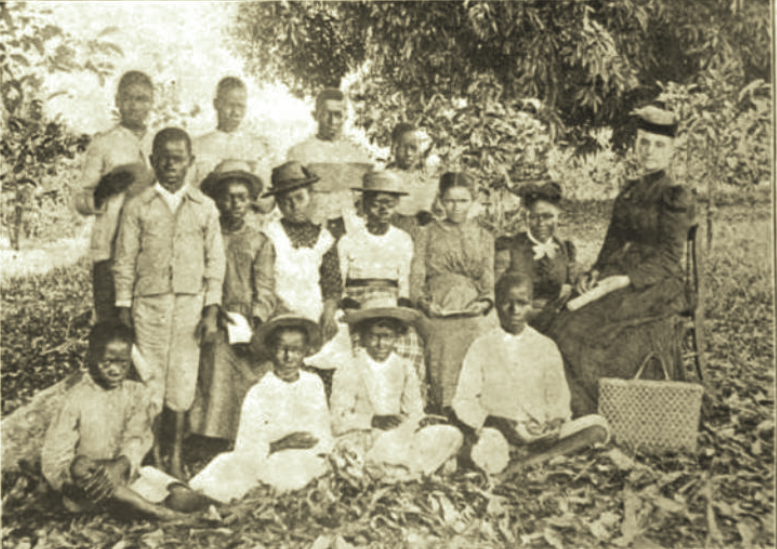
Emma Day's Sunday-School class at the Muhlenberg Mission

The Emma V. Day Memorial Fund, toward the establishment of a hospital, and the Emma V. Day Industrial School Fund, toward the education of indigenous African girls for mission work, honored her legacy.

== Young People's Society of Christian Endeavor ==
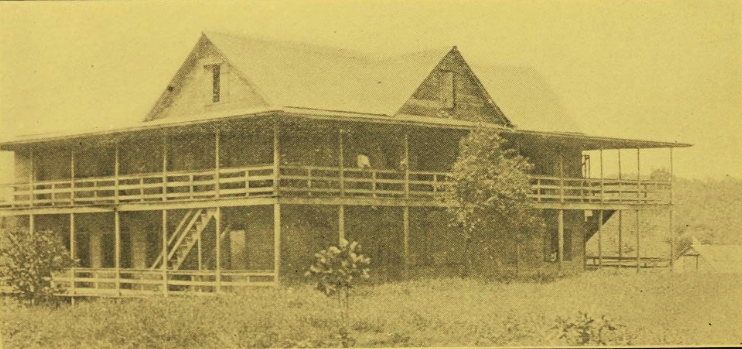
Boys' dormitory (1911)

The young people of Muhlenberg were interested in the Young People's Society of Christian Endeavor, and were doing their part in Christian work. Rev. George P. Goll, one of the missionaries at Muhlenberg stated:— "The Muhlenberg Mission Christian Endeavor Society was organized on January 6, 1891 through the efforts of Mrs. Day and Rev. George P. Goll. The 12 members enrolled at that time were representatives of the various tribes about the mission, including the Golah, Bassa, Congo, and Pessa tribes, as well as several Liberians. The number soon increased until there were nearly 60 or 70 members. Quite a number, however, dropped out on account of the work they were required to do. The majority worked in the various committees to which they were assigned. The society was the means of making the young people of the mission more loyal to the Lutheran Church, more liberal in their gifts, and also of deepening their spiritual life. Lorenzo Smart, the president of the society, was an earnest worker. Another Christian Endeavor Society was formed in Harrisburg, on the eastern side of the river, which was the direct outcome of the society at Muhlenberg. A Junior Society was also formed at Muhlenberg."

== Early 20th-century ==
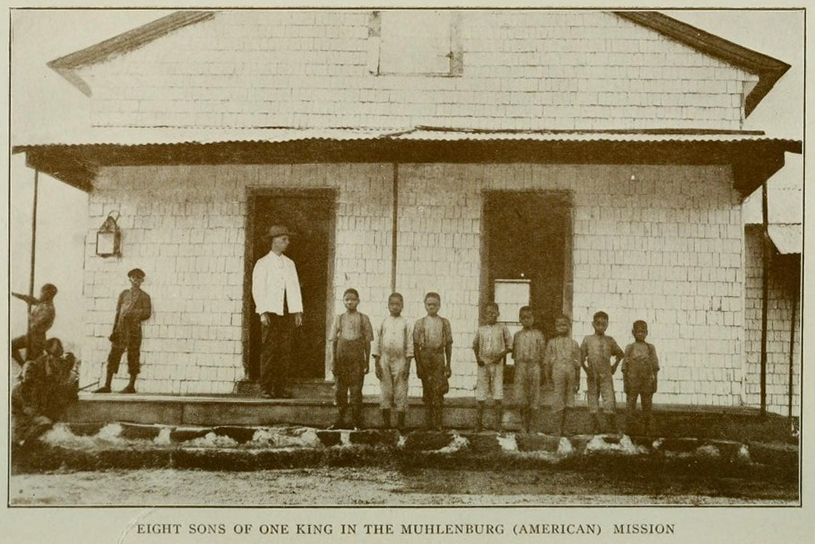
A king and sons at the Muhlenburg Mission (1910)

Reports from industrial missions of other denominations did not give such encouraging results as were found in the Muhlenberg Mission. The reasons assigned were the much greater outlay required than had been anticipated, the unfitness of some missionaries and the discouragement of the indigenous population.

In this field, the work was greatly hampered by frequent changes of missionaries. With the exception of Dr. Day's service of a quarter of a century, the 32 missionaries served for short periods only, and of these Revs. Goll and Pohlmann served the longest. The staff in 1904 consisted of Rev. Will M. Beck, Rev. and Mrs. Hiram Straw and Rev. W. R. Miller. Rev. Beck was superintendent of the mission and directed the Boys' School at Muhlenberg. The attendance in 1904 was 55. The work in the Emma V. Day Girls' School was encouraging. Rev. and Mrs. Straw had charge of it. There was evidence of progress in the religious and educational department of the work. Rev. Miller had charge of the mission chapel; Rev. Straw, of the Day Memorial Church; and the native Evangelist, Stanford of St. Paul's Church.

== Notable people ==
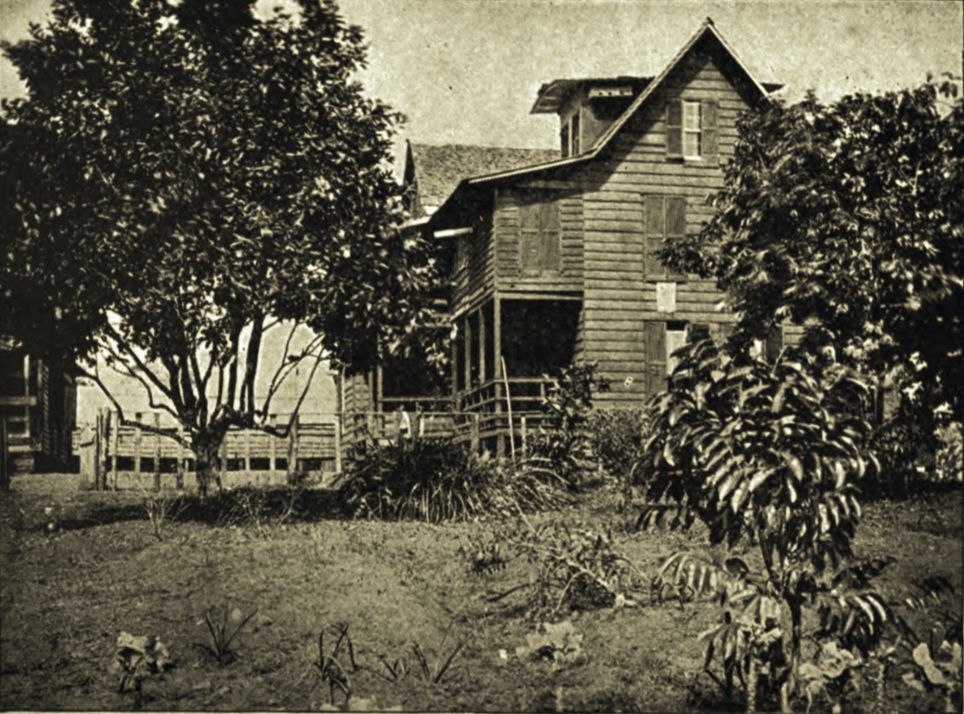
Residence of missionaries at the Muhlenberg Mission

- Rev. M. Officer, arrived April 1860; returned to the U.S. April 1861
- Rev. H. Heigard, arrived April 1860; returned August 1864
- Miss Kilpatrick, subsequently Mrs. Heigard, joined the mission August 1860; returned October 1863
- Rev. J. Kistler, arrived August 1863; returned 1867
- Mrs. Kistler, arrived July 1864; died 1866
- Rev. J. M. Riche, arrived July 1864; returned 1865
- Rev. S. P. Carnell, arrived March 1869; died May 1870
- Clement Irons, arrived 1875
- Rev. B. B. Collins, arrived November 1875; returned April 1876
- Mrs. Collins, arrived November 1875; died on return voyage, April 1876
- Mr. Herman Voss, arrived July 1877; returned in 1878
- Rev. E. M. Hubler, arrived January 1888; died October 1889
- Mrs. Hubler, arrived June 1889; returned December 1889
- Mrs. Goll, arrived January 1893; died February 1893
- Rev. G. P. Goll, arrived 1888
- Rev. Dr. David A. Day, arrived 1874; died on return voyage, 1897
- Emma V. Day, arrived 1874; returned 1894
