= David A. Day (missionary) =

American missionary

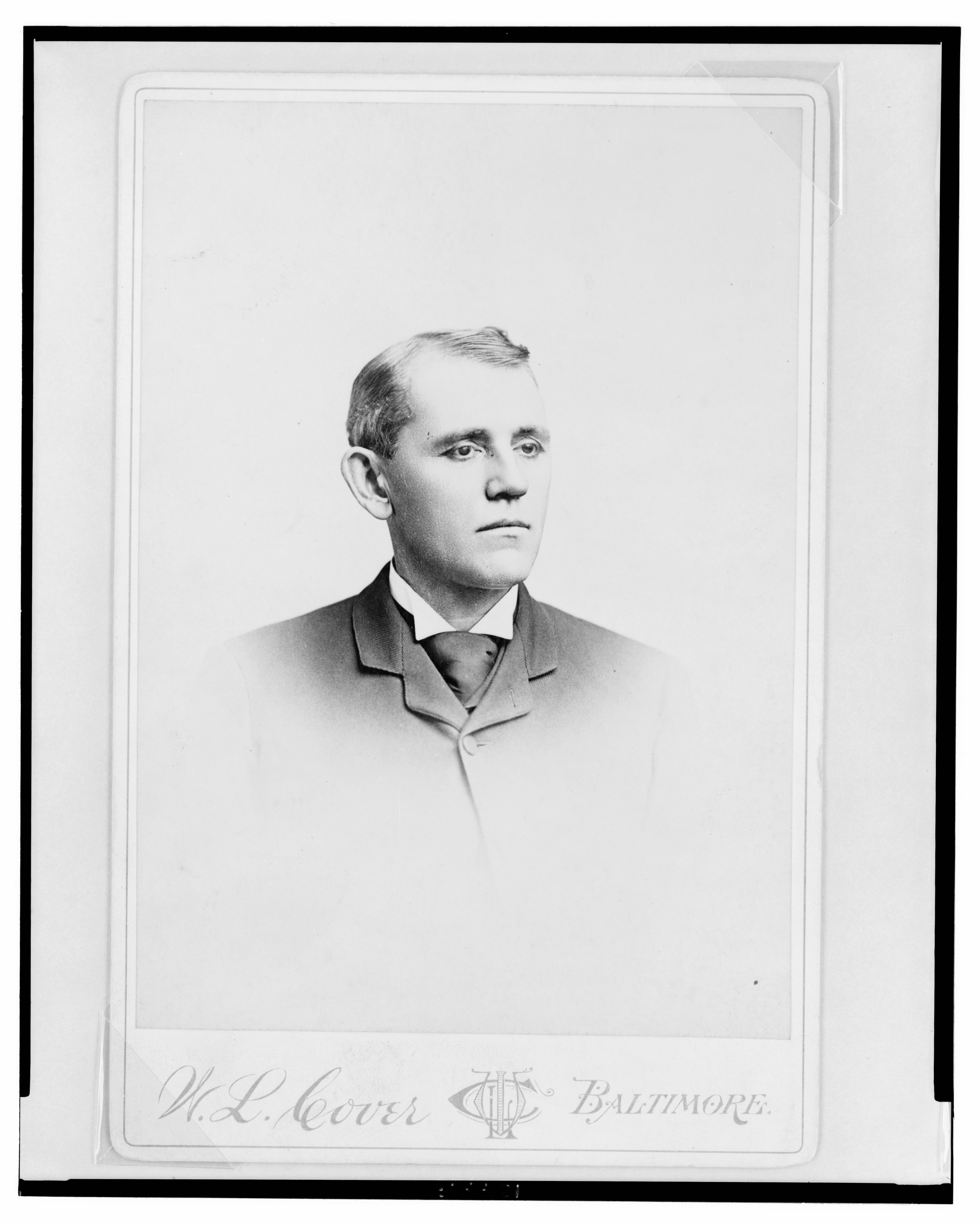
David A. Day

David A. Day (February 17, 1851 – December 17, 1897) was an American Lutheran missionary who, under the auspices of the Evangelical Lutheran General Synod, worked in Liberia from 1874 until shortly before his death in 1897.

== Biography ==
David Alexander Day was born in Dillsburg, Pennsylvania, February 17, 1851. His early life was filled with hardship. At 12, he went to work for the government stables in Harrisburg, Pennsylvania, and at 13, he (illegally) joined the Union Army for the remaining years of the American Civil War.

In 1869, he entered the Missionary Institute in Selinsgrove, Pennsylvania. There, in May 1874, he married Emily (Emma) Virginia Winegarden.

Day was ordained by the Frankean Synod. The couple arrived together in Africa only a month later, where they remained for the majority of their lives. David only returned to North America twice while living, once 1883, and again after the death of his wife in 1893.

In late 1896, Day married Anna E. Whitfield of Ontario, Canada, a nurse at a Methodist mission in Liberia. The following year, Day contracted an illness, and died at sea en route to the United States. As per his wishes, Day's remains were interred, along with the remains of Emily Day, at Union Cemetery in Selinsgrove, on a hill overlooking Susquehanna University. David and Emily's children, Florence, Gilbert, and Lily (none of whom survived adolescence) remain buried in Liberia.

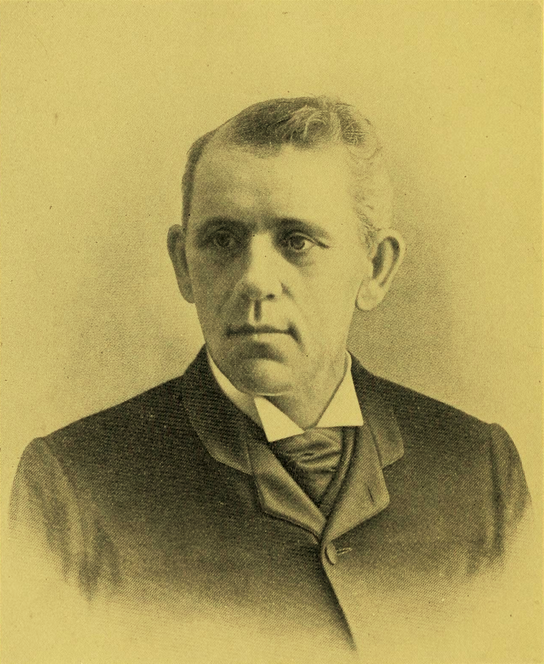
(undated)

Following his death, the Muhlenberg Mission continued operations well into the Twentieth Century, ceasing operation when the Lutheran Church of Liberia was formed in 1966. David Day had the longest tenure of any missionary at Muhlenberg for the majority of the time the mission was operational.

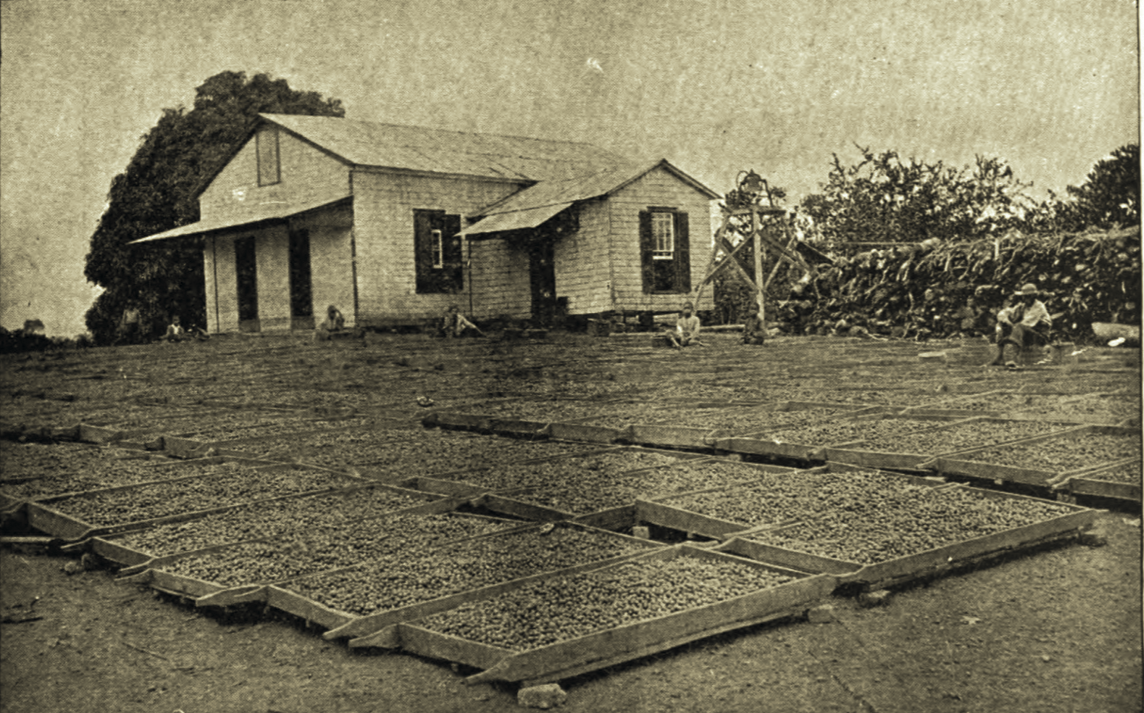
Muhlenberg Mission Chapel with coffee trays in front

His work in Africa centered on the Muhlenberg Mission on the Saint Paul River, about 20 miles upriver of Monrovia, Liberia. The mission was founded by Morris Officer in 1860. Day's ministry while in Liberia focused on education as well as religious conversion; a former school teacher, Day was an early advocate of coeducational facilities, and taught trade classes such as blacksmithing, carpentry, and others in addition to a traditional classroom education. During his time in Liberia, Day frequently corresponded with friends and colleagues in the United States, submitted countless articles to the Lutheran Observer, and was incredibly outspoken in his efforts to eliminate the American and European rum trade along the African coast. Although his campaigning proved unsuccessful, he was, however, able to create a dry zone around the Muhlenberg Mission. While at the mission, Day orchestrated the construction of the "Sarah Ann," a side-wheeler steam craft used to speed up travel on the St. Paul River. He received a Doctor of Divinities (D.D.) degree from the Lutheran Seminary at Gettysburg in 1893 while in Liberia.

== Sources ==
- Harold Vink Whetstone, Lutheran Mission in Liberia, (Board of Foreign Missions of the United Lutheran Church in America, 1955), pp. 24–51.
- George Scholl, D.D., "David A. Day," in Missionary Heroes of the Lutheran Church, ed. Luther B. Wolf (Lutheran Publication Society, 1911), pp. 199–219.
- Margaret R. Seebach, Man in the Bush, (Baltimore, MD: Publication Press, 1945), pp. 59–93.
- Gertrude Simpson Leonard, Our Africa Story, (Baltimore, MD: General Literature Committee), pp. 19–22.
