= Robert Bostock (merchant) =

English slave trader

Robert Bostock (22 April 1784, in Bootle – 1847 in Hobart) was an English merchant sailor who along with John McQueen, was accused of co-owning a slave trading post on the Saint Paul River, in Liberia.
