= Timbo Island, Sierra Leone =

Island in Sierra Leone

Coordinates: 8°34′35″N 12°58′50″W

Timbo Island or Tambo Island is an island in the Rokel River, Sierra Leone.
