= Mabilafu =

Mabilafu Bilafu
- Location in Sierra Leone
- Coordinates: 8°42′N 12°14′W
- Country: Sierra Leone
- Province: Northern Province
- District: Tonkolili District
- Chiefdom: Malal Mara
- Neighbouring Villages: Rotunka, Rubung Magbansa, Masethle, Laminaya
- Elevation: 70 m (230 ft)

Population (2013)
  - Total: ca. 1,000
- Time zone: Greenwich Mean Time

Mabilafu is located about 110 km east of Freetown and about 30 km south-west of Makeni. It is on the bank of the Rokel River, the largest river in Sierra Leone. Mabilafu is the main village of the same-named Mabilafu Section, which contains six villages. The Mabilafu Section is one of the sections in the Malal Mara Chiefdom in the Tonkolili District in the Northern Sierra Leone Province.

In 2013 the village encompassed roughly 140 houses with a total population of approximately thousand people. The large majority of them were Temne – the prevalent ethnic group in this area – and Muslims – the predominant religion in Sierra Leone. However, animist beliefs and secret societies such as the Poro-Society play important roles in the everyday experiences of the people.

Most houses of the village are along a dead-ending dirt road that approaches the Rokel River approximately at the right angles. Closer to the river the road splits and the lower part of the village is wider (see satellite image of Mabilafu). This lower part of the village is older than the upper part, where most houses just had been constructed recently. The village is divided roughly in four quarters, each for one of the four #landowning families of Mabilafu. The mosque can be found in the lower part of the village, where the people also have constructed a new village center, an open sided, zinc roofed cement building with a seed storage, a small stage and wooden benches. Meetings and other events take place in this village center. An Evangelical Mission Primary School is located by the end of the upper part of the village. In 2013 a total of 265 children from Mabilafu and surrounding villages were enrolled at this school that also distributed a daily meal provided by the World Food Programme.

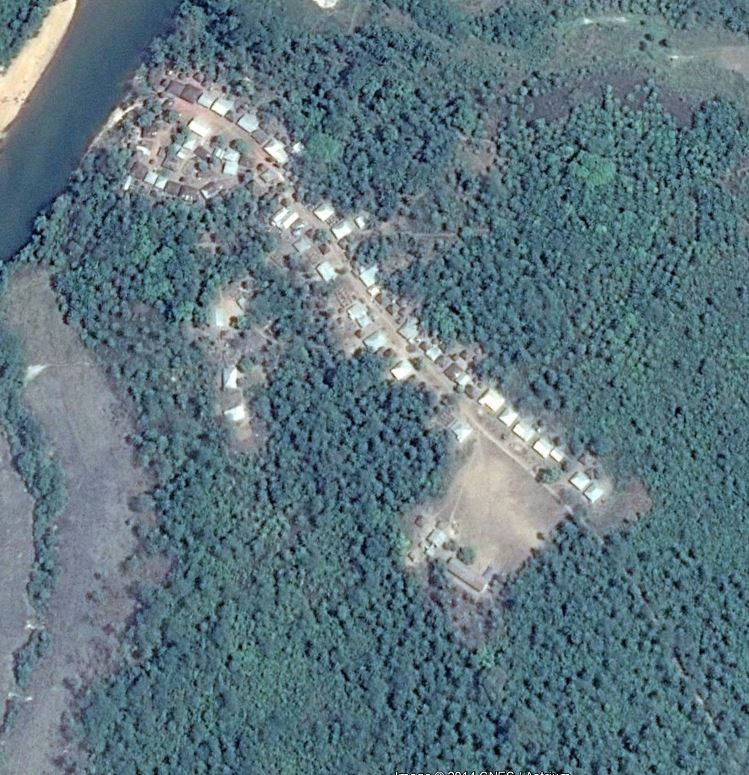
Mabilafu

== Economic Activities ==
Subsistence oriented shifting cultivation has been the predominant livelihood strategy in Mabilafu until recently. As generally in rural Sierra Leone, access to land and associated resources is organized by customary law, rules and regulations that are developed locally and embedded in the local culture. Accordingly, four families own the land in Mabilafu. However, these families are obliged to share access to their land with landusers, people who do not own land. With these interlinked property and user rights, not only the families who own land, but also landusers can benefit from the land and associated resources in Mabilafu. Therewith, land and resources are like common-pool resources. This previous use of land and resources – that already had been vulnerable to food crisis – has been strongly affected by the implementation of the Addax Bioenergy Project that has been implemented in this region in 2010.

The village is within reach of mobile phone signals (airtel) but has neither current water nor electricity. To charge the mobile phones people go to the “Charging”, the only house with a functioning generator where electronic devices can be charged for a small amount. Further, a simple black smith has been installed behind some houses to produce tools for farming and constructing and pots for cooking. Behind another house, a garage has been set up to repair motorbikes and a carpenter produces furniture. Some women have established small temporary shops to sell petty commodities like soap, sweets, salt, cigarettes, top-up cares, drugs, vegetables or fish and two shelter serve as temporarily bars.

== Impacts of the Addax Bioenergy Project in Mabilafu ==
The Addax Bioenergy Project is a so-called large-scale land acquisition project. In 2010 Addax Bioenergy acquired 54’000 hectare land in this region to produce agro-ethanol or so called biofuel from sugarcane, grown on irrigated plots. Mabilafu is inside the Addax Bioenergy Project area and close by the construction site for the project's agro-ethanol processing factory that started its operation in 2014. The implementation of this project has led to profound changes in Mabilafu. Land has been acquired for the construction of the agro-ethanol processing factory, related infrastructure and sugarcane plantations. Thereby, access to land and important resources for the hitherto prevalent subsistence oriented livelihood strategy in Mabilafu has been seriously limited. Even though landowners are monetary compensated with a small annual lease and acknowledgment payment and one-off payments for destroyed local assets, such as cropped areas and so called economic trees, this compensation is inadequate.

1. The money that the landowners receive, is too small to compensate the losses they experienced.
2. Landusers, who previously also could use this land and associated resources, generally don't received money from the company.
3. Other mitigation measures implemented by the company to compensate for negative impacts are not able to compensate the above-mentioned losses.

The company pays an annual lease and acknowledgement of ca. 35’000 Leones per hectare per year to the landowner. Further, compensations are paid for economic trees. However, compared to the negative impacts on the previous land- and resource use – that already had been debilitated previously – the money paid to the landowners is very small and insufficient to buy substituting food therefrom.

Further, the previous organization of access to land and associated resources enabled not only landowners, but also landusers, to benefit from the land and associated resources. However, compensations paid by the company benefit solely landowners but not the landusers who also lost access to previously used land and associated resources. This indicates that the compensation measures do not consider the previous local property and user rights adequately.

Other mitigation measures such as the Farmer Development Program, a development program implemented by the company, aiming at modernizing the local agriculture and enhancing local food production, or the creation of wage-employment failed to compensate the losses caused by the large-scale land acquisition. Due to organizational constraints and lacking consideration of the local context, the Farmer Development Program in Mabilafu failed. Harvests were poor and people were not able to adopt the newly thought mode of production. Thus, this program could not benefit the people. Further, the company assumed to create positive impacts by the creation of new wage-employment. However, in practice, this newly created wage-employment is highly precarious. Not everybody who experienced a loss by the acquisition of land got a job and most jobs are not permanent with very low salaries. Thus, these newly created jobs do not offer a secure income that could substitute lost access to land and associated resources. Therewith, this acquisition of land by the company and the creation of wage-employment resembles primitive accumulation and capitalist exploitation as described in Marxist theories.

In order to deal with this new situation of precarious working condition people had to develop alternative strategies, such as maintaining subsistence production or establishing informal economic activities. However, not everybody was able to develop such alternative strategies successfully and especially people that have been underprivileged previously, experienced great difficulties or failed totally to develop strategies in order to cope with the new situation.

Further, even though the newly created jobs are precarious, they attracted a great number of people – mostly men – searching employment. Thus, in the last years, the number of people living in Mabilafu increased greatly. If previously mostly women moved to Mabilafu – due to the customary of virilocal marriage – in the last years the number of men moving to Mabilafu increased greatly.

This reveals that the impacts of the Addax Bioenergy Project in Mabilafu are challenging for the people living in the village, even though the company praises itself to be a best practice example for sustainable large-scale land acquisition.
