= Queen Elizabeth II Quay =

Port in Sierra Leone

Coordinates: 8°29′37.21″N 13°12′37.34″W

Queen Elizabeth II Quay and the surrounding city of Freetown, Sierra Leone, 2009.

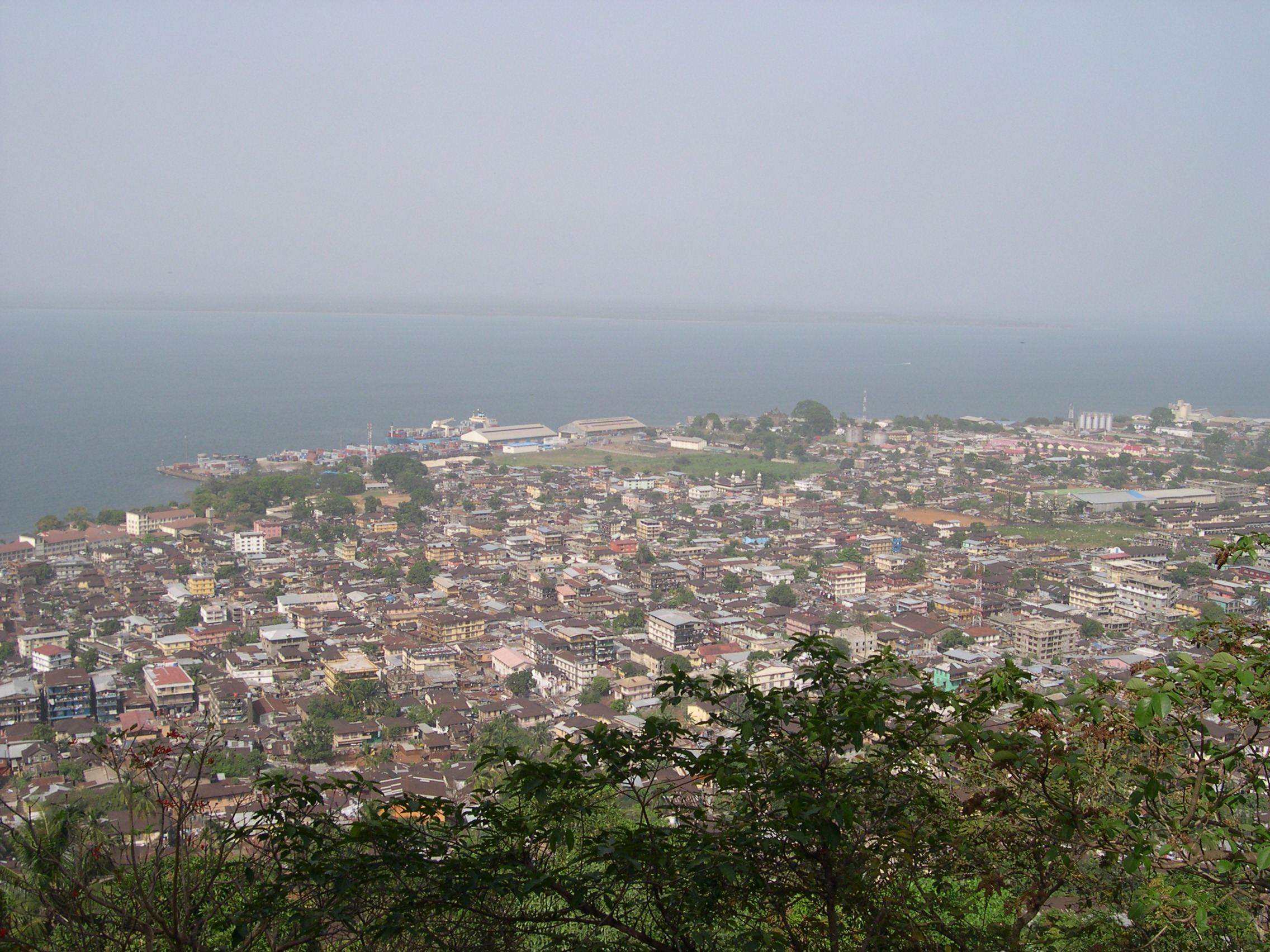
Queen Elizabeth II Quay, taken from Mount Aureol, Facing NNE, March 2008. The warehouses for berth 3 and berth 4 are visible along the water's edge in the middle.

Queen Elizabeth II Quay, also known as QE II Quay (/ˌkjuːiːˈtuːkiː/) and by residents as the Deep Water Quay, is a locality in Freetown, Sierra Leone. It is located on a promontory called Fourah Point (also known variously as Farran Point, Farren Point, and Foura Point) on the southern bank of the estuary of the Sierra Leone River between Destruction Bay and Cline Bay within the suburb of Cline Town directly to the east of central Freetown. It is the larger of two harbors within Freetown, the other harbor known as Government Wharf, Freetown Port, or simply "the harbor" and is Freetown's more centrally located harbor.

Queen Elizabeth II Quay has sometimes been the called the "third largest natural harbor in the world"— this is inaccurate in two respects: 1.) the QE II Quay is not itself a natural harbor but a man-made port or "quay", and 2.) the quay is a very small feature of the river estuary on which it was built— it is this estuary which has carved out what is the largest natural harbor on the African continent.

This still puts this harbor behind Port Jackson in Sydney, Australia, and several natural harbors claiming the title for world's second largest, including Halifax Harbour in Nova Scotia, Poole Harbour in Dorset, southern England, and Cork Harbour in County Cork, Ireland. The government of Sierra Leone assumed management of the Quay in 1964. It decided to privatize the property in 2007, converting the port from a "service" port into a "land lord" port.

== Design and history ==
Construction of the quay began in 1953 on what was once called Fourah Bay. Estimates in the British House of Commons in 1955 were that the quay would cost around £1,470,000. By 1960 the entire bay was filled in, creating a large uninhabited reclamation area to the south. The final structure is 1,067 metres (3,501 ft) end to end with a draught allowance of 30 feet (9.1 m). The Sierra Leone Railway used to have a large terminal and headquarters nearby but these were removed in the 1970s.

The quay includes six numbered berths designed to accommodate either passenger or cargo ships, and has several warehouses and extensive outdoor storage space. Repeated military invasions of Freetown during the 1991-2002 Sierra Leone Civil War resulted in significant damage to the quay's facilities in the late 1990s, including a crater within berth 5 which remained inoperable and under repair ten years later.

The port has never had adequate equipment for the loading and unloading of cargo, and has faced numerous other structural and organizational problems: on October 29 of 2007, for example, the port's then only forklift broke down after being filled with gasoline which had been diluted with water, causing a 48-hour total standstill in the movement of cargo containers, and Sierra Leonians have complained to the country's president about chronic corruption at the quay. As of 2009 the port's stevedoring facilities include two forklifts, one "super-reacher", four reach stackers, five German MAFI trucks (each with a carrying capacity of 50 tons), one tug master, one pilot cutter, and a fire engine. It has ship chandler facilities, but no shipyard. The Chinese company Tidfore is investing $700 million to improve the quay's infrastructure. China has invested more than any other country in Sierra Leone's economy.

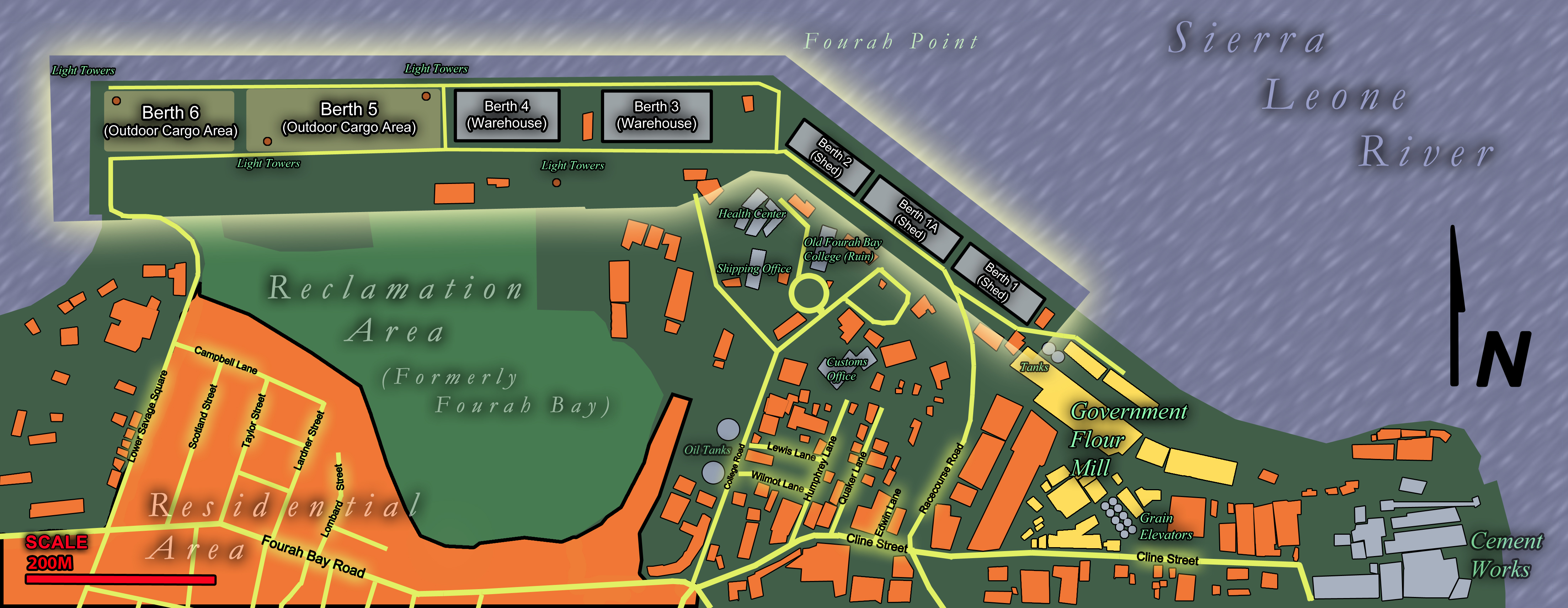
Detail Map of Queen Elizabeth II Quay

Though formally numbered 1 through 6, the quay actually contains seven berths, assigned the numbers 1, 1A, 2, 3, 4, 5, and 6. Berths 1, 1A, and 2 each include one small storage shed; berths 3 and 4 each contain one large warehouse; berths 5 and 6 consist only of outdoor cargo stacking areas.

On September 26 of 2009 the ro-ro vessel MV Oriental Hero, a Hong Kong-based cargo ship flying a Panamanian flag of convenience and carrying a cargo of trucks, trailers, and bagged cement collided with and damaged berth 1A and 2. Berth 2 remained operational but part of berth 1A had to be closed for repairs. The impact was strong enough to form cracks in the quay's administrative building.
