= Dry rivers of Africa =

Rainy season sources of water

Dry rivers in Africa refers to streams whose bed is either above the water table or which are only intermittently parched. They often serve as the main sources of water during the rainy season, and their floodplains can support a diverse range of wildlife and vegetation.

== List of notable dry rivers ==
=== Kuiseb River (Namibia) ===
The Kuiseb River in Namibia is a prominent ephemeral river in Africa. It flows from the Khomas highlands west of Windhoek to Walvis Bay, through the Namib Desert. The river only flows above ground during the rare occurrences of heavy rain in its catchment area.

=== Swakop River (Namibia) ===
The Swakop River is another significant ephemeral river in Namibia. It is approximately 460 kilometers long, flowing from the eastern slopes of the Khomas Highland, and it only reaches the Atlantic Ocean after heavy rain.

=== Draa River (Morocco) ===
The Draa River in Morocco is Morocco's longest river, but its flow is irregular. The river is often dry for much of the year and only flows during the wet season.

== See also ==
- Rivers of Africa
- Climate change in Africa
- Water scarcity in Africa
