= Zartlahn District =

District in Rivercess County, Liberia

- District
- Location within Liberia
- Coordinates: 5°39′28″N 9°30′32″W
- Country: Liberia
- County: Rivercess County
- Elevation: 94 m (308 ft)

Population (2008)
  - Total: 7,146
- Time zone: UTC+0
- Geocode: 9645149

Zartlahn District is one of 8 districts of Rivercess County, Liberia. As of 2008, the population was 7,146.

== Climate ==
Zarflahn District

Climate chart (precipitation, max. and min. temperature)
J	F	M	A	M	J	J	A	S	O	N	D
20 23 20	114 23 20	153 23 21	177 24 20	357 22 20	334 22 18	228 21 16	194 20 17	436 21 17	414 22 18	260 23 19	60 23 20
- █ Average max. and min. temperatures in °C
- █ Precipitation totals in mm
Imperial conversion
J	F	M	A	M	J	J	A	S	O	N	D
0.8 73 68	4.5 73 68	6 73 70	7 75 68	14 72 68	13 72 64	9 70 61	7.6 68 63	17 70 63	16 72 64	10 73 66	2.4 73 68
- █ Average max. and min. temperatures in °F
- █ Precipitation totals in inches
