= Emma V. Day =

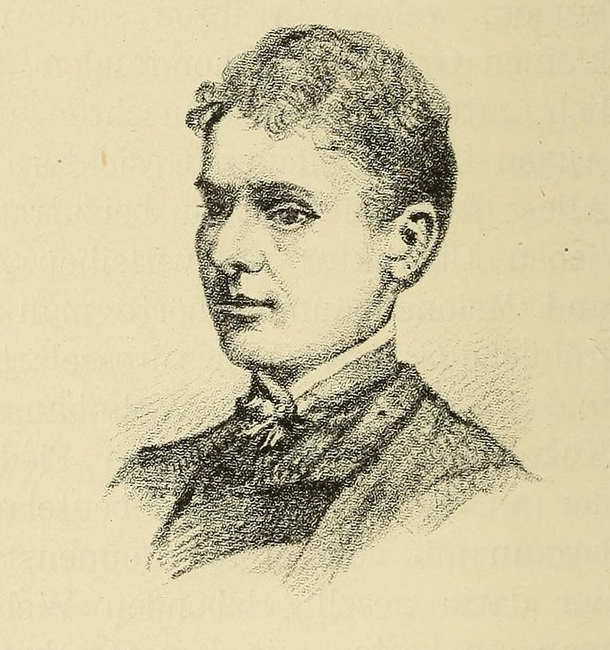

Personal life
- Born: Emily Virginia Winegarden; June 10, 1853 Philadelphia, Pennsylvania, U.S.
- Died: August 10, 1895 (aged 42) near Lewisburg, Pennsylvania, U.S.
- Resting place: Selinsgrove, Pennsylvania
- Spouse: David A. Day (m. 1874)
- Children: 3

Religious life
- Religion: Christianity
- Denomination: Evangelical Lutheran General Synod of the United States of America
- Profession: missionary

Emma V. Day (née, Winegarden; June 10, 1853 – August 10, 1895) was an American Christian missionary. In 1874, she married David A. Day of the Lutheran Mission of Africa for the Evangelical Lutheran General Synod of the United States of America. On the establishment of their home at the Muhlenberg Mission in Liberia, Africa, she took upon herself the training of the children. Two of the Day's own children were born in Africa. In 1894, her health declined and she returned to the US where she died in 1895, near Lewisburg, Pennsylvania.

== Early life ==
Emily (nickname, "Emma") Virginia Winegarden was born June 10, 1853, in Philadelphia. Her mother died when she was an infant, and she was adopted by an aunt. When quite young she became an active member of the Methodist Episcopal Church.

== Career ==
In spring 1874, Day married David A. Day, of the Lutheran Mission to Africa, and then transferred her membership to the Evangelical Lutheran Church.

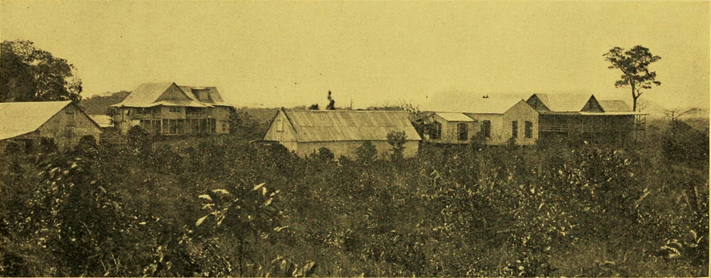
Muhlenberg Mission

Immediately after their marriage, they sailed from New York City to Liberia. Her life thereafter was associated with the development of the Muhlenberg Mission connected with the Lutheran Church. For 21 years, she worked to train the girls in tasks such as dressmaking. She spoke of the Liberian people as "her people", expecting to give her life to their welfare.

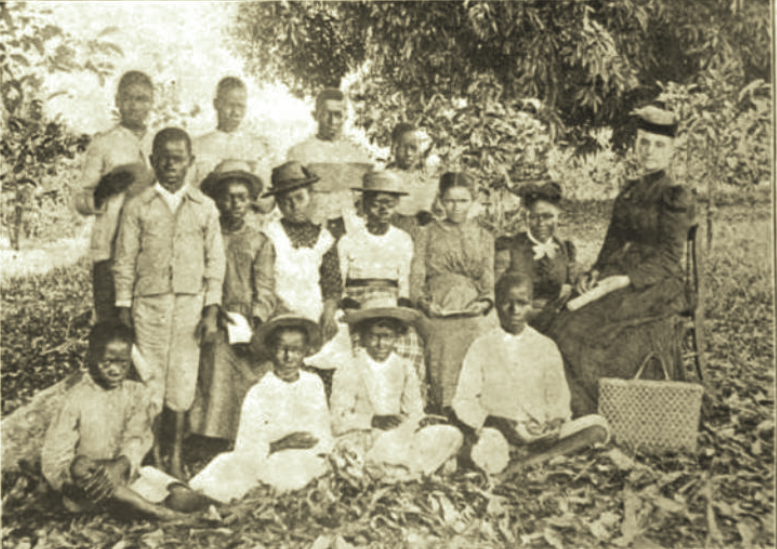
Emma Day's Sunday-School class at the Muhlenberg Mission

== Personal life ==
Three children were born to the Days. Two of them, Gilbert (d. 1877) and Florence (d. 1878) were born, died, and were buried at the mission. The third, Leila (d. 1890) was born in the US while Day was on a vacation. She returned with Day to Liberia at eight years of age, but died within a year and was buried beside the other two children. During her missionary career, Day crossed the Atlantic ocean five times.

The Days returned to the US on furloughs in 1879 and in 1883.

== Death and legacy ==
In 1894, Day returned to the US alone to recuperate from ill health. Her husband accompanied his wife to the port, both believing they would never see each other again. Her last letter to her husband, shortly before her death, expressed a fear that he might desire to come home on her account. She wrote, "Do not come home; stay where you are; Africa needs you more than I do."

Day, on her return to the US from Africa, was without a permanent home. She died at the residence of a relative, near Lewisburg, Pennsylvania, on August 10, 1895. (Note: According to Logan (1912), Emma's date of death was August 10, 1894.) The cause of her death was consumption, brought on by African fever.

Day was buried in a borrowed grave. Her interment took place under the care of Dr. Stall, at Mifflinburg, Pennsylvania. Later, her husband requested to have her body exhumed and buried in the cemetery at Selinsgrove, Pennsylvania, which occurred on November 25, 1896. The epitaph on the tomb she shared with her husband read in part:—

"Africa weeps."
Emma V. Day, wife of Rev. David A. Day, D. D.
Born June 10, 1853 - Died August 10, 1895,
Aged 42 years and 8 months.

The Emma V. Day Memorial Fund, toward the establishment of a hospital, and the Emma V. Day Industrial School Fund, toward the education of indigenous African girls for mission work, are named after her. By 1898, a hospital building was added to "The Emma V. Day Memorial Industrial School for Girls".
