= Timbo District =

- Location within Liberia
- Coordinates: 5°33′49″N 9°43′12″W
- Country: Liberia

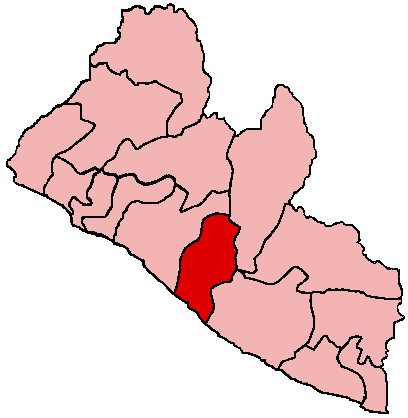
Map of Liberia with Rivercess County highlighted.

Timbo District was one of the two original districts of Rivercess County, Liberia.
