= List of Liberian counties by Human Development Index =

This is a list of Liberian counties by Human Development Index as of 2023.

Rank	County	HDI (2023)
Medium human development
1	Montserrado	▲0.581
Low human development
–	Liberia	▲0.510
2	River Gee	▲0.499
2	Maryland	▲0.499
4	Grand Gedeh	▲0.494
5	Nimba	▲0.492
5	Margibi	▲0.492
7	Bomi	▲0.488
8	Bong	▲0.470
9	Grand Kru	▲0.465
10	Sinoe	▲0.462
11	Rivercess	▲0.453
12	Lofa	▲0.447
13	Grand Bassa	▲0.439
14	Grand Cape Mount	▲0.419
15	Gbarpolu	▲0.412
