= River Cess =

Capital of Rivercress County, Liberia

- Location in Liberia
- Coordinates: 5°28′N 9°35′W
- Country: Liberia
- County: Rivercess County

Population (2008)
  - Total: 2,578
- Climate: Af

River Cess is the capital city of Rivercess County, Liberia. As of the 2008 national census, the population stood at 2,578. It received its original name Cestos from Portuguese traders in the early 16th century from the baskets that were produced and sold in the town. Cestos in Portuguese and Spanish means basket.
