= Bankasoka River =

Coordinates: 8°45′26.4″N 12°47′21.6″W

Bankasoka
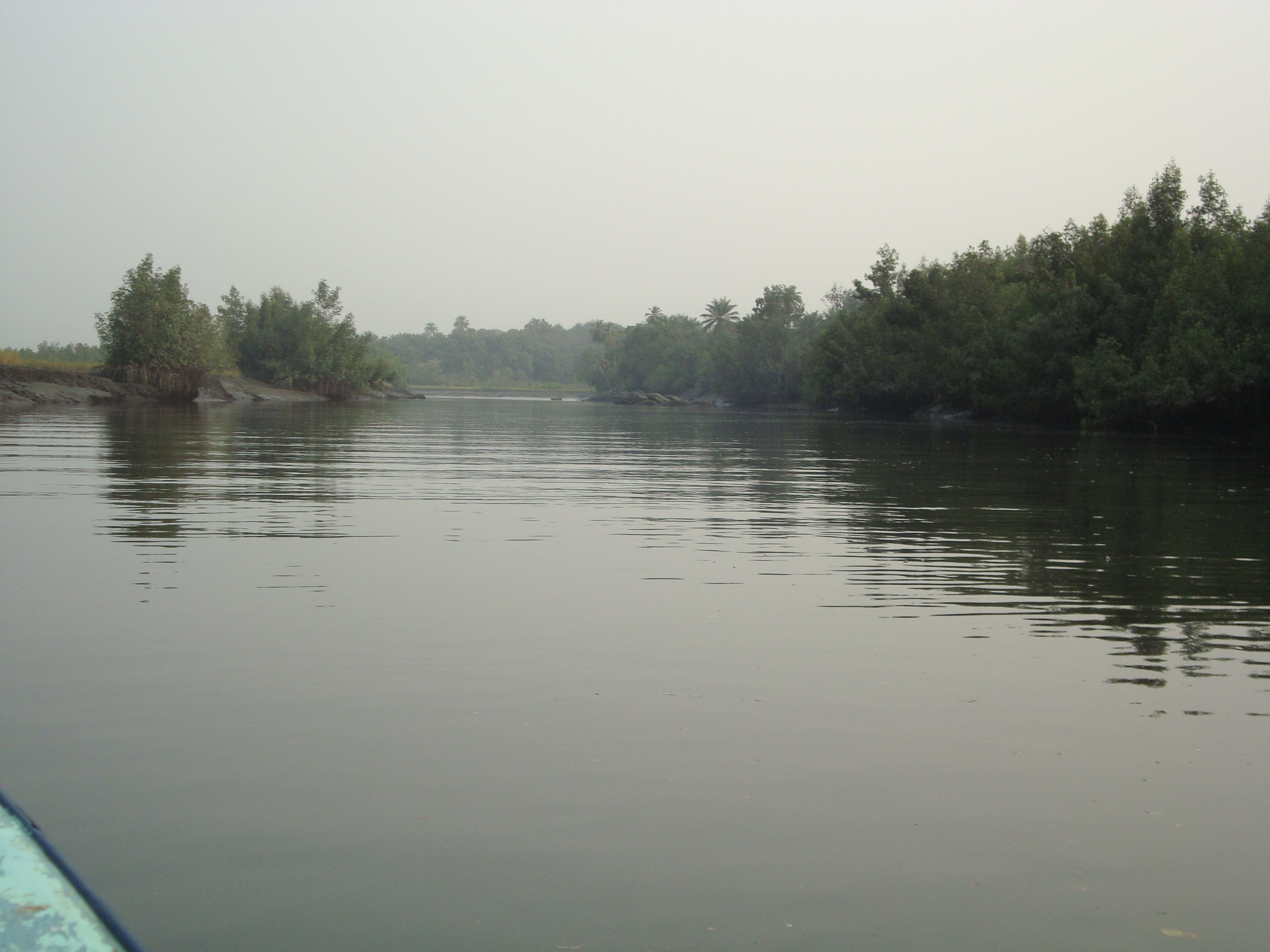

Location
- Country: Sierra Leone

Basin features
- Inland ports: Port Pepel and Port Loko

The Bankasoka River is a river in Sierra Leone.

As a tidal estuary (also called Port Loko Creek) it combines with the Rokel River to the south to form the Sierra Leone River.

Two ports are located on this river, Port Pepel and Port Loko.

The Bankasoka is a coastal river that, together with the Rokel River, forms the Sierra Leone River estuary about 40 kilometres off the Atlantic Ocean. Its northern part is also known as Tumbu-See English Tumbu Lake ). The river is also known as Port Loko Creek because the town of the same name is located on the river.

There are three small hydroelectric power stations near Port Loko.
