= Central Rivercess District =

District of Liberia

Coordinates: 5.780°N 9.324°W

Central RiverCess District is one of 8 districts of Rivercess County, Liberia. As of 2008, the population was 8,303.
