= Fatala River =

River located in Northern Upper Guinea

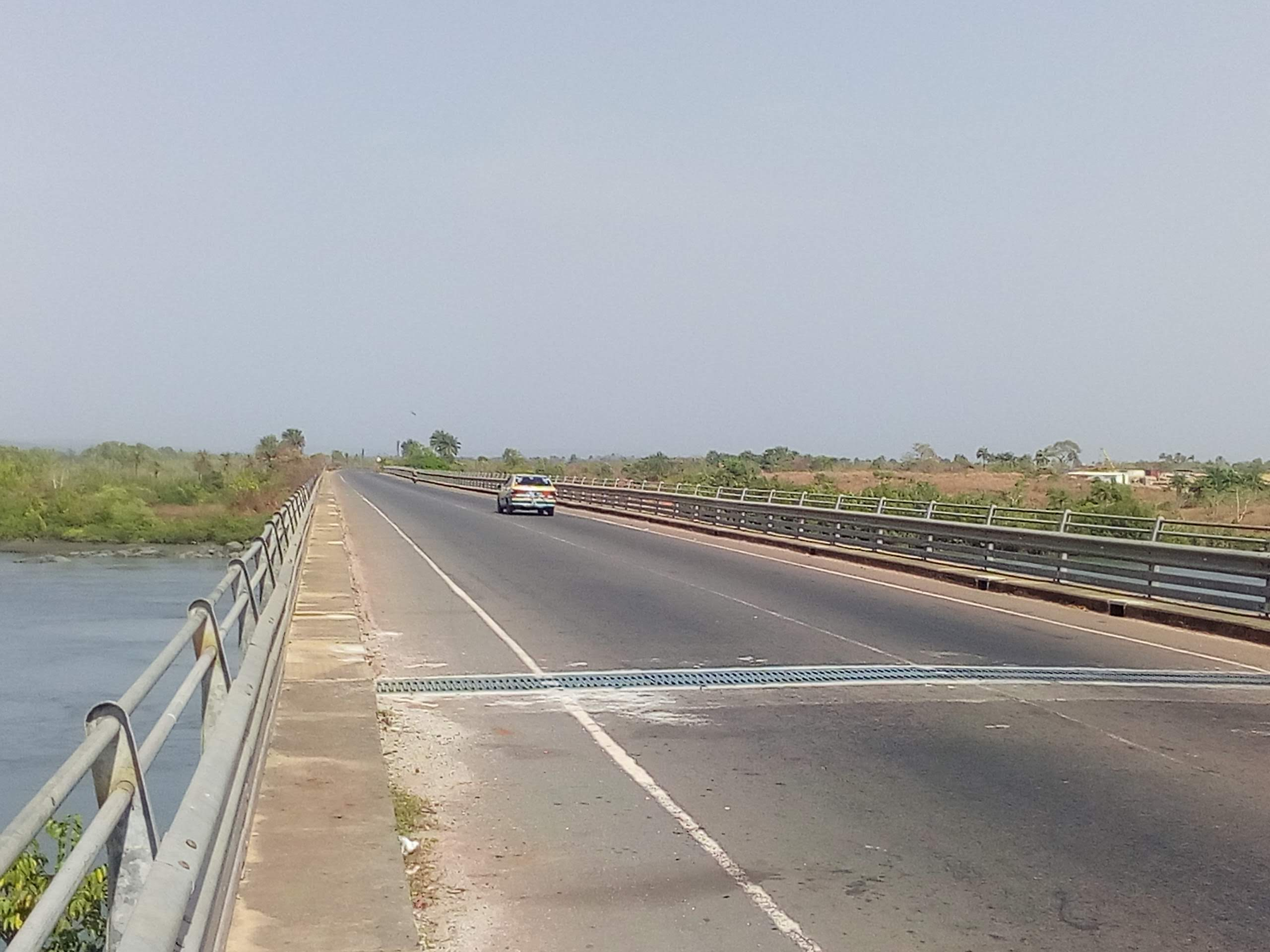
Bridge over the Fatala River in Boffa

The Fatala River is a river located in Lower Guinea. It is 205 km long, with its source in the Fria region. It has a basin 6092 km^{2} in size and flows through the Boffa Prefecture. It is a tributary of the Rio Pongo.
