= Rivercess County =

County of Liberia

- County
- Flag

- Location in Liberia
- Coordinates: 6°0′N 9°20′W
- Country: Liberia
- Capital: River Cess
- Districts: 8
- Established: 13 December 1985

Government
  - Superintendent: J. Bismark Karbiah

Area
  - Total: 5,594 km^{2} (2,160 sq mi)

Population (2008)
  - Total: 71,509
  - Density: 12.8/km^{2} (33/sq mi)
- Time zone: UTC+0 (GMT)
- HDI (2018): 0.430 low · 10th of 15

Rivercess County is a county in the south-central portion of the West African nation of Liberia. One of 15 counties that compose the first-level of administrative division in the nation, it has six districts. River Cess serves as the capital with the area of the county measuring 2,160 square miles (5,600 km^{2}). As of the 2008 Census, it had a population of 71,509, making it the second-least populous county in Liberia after Grand Kru County. Around 96% of its population is Bassa.

Eighth largest in area, the county was created in 1984. It is bordered by Grand Bassa County to the west, Nimba County on the northeast, and Sinoe County to the southeast, while the southern part lies on the Atlantic Ocean. The current County Superintendent is B. Rancy Ziankahn.

== Geography ==
River Cess County accommodates the FDA/OTC Reforestation Project with a designated National Plantation area of 276 ha (680 acres). The county has coastal plains that raises to a height of 30 m (98 ft) above the sea-level inward to a distance of 25 km (16 mi). These plains receive a very high rainfall ranging from 4,450 mm (175 in) to 4,500 mm (180 in) per year and receive longer sunshine with a humidity of 85 to 95 percent. It is swampy along rivers and creeks, while there are patches of Savannah woodland. Rice and cassava interplanted with Sugarcane are the major crops grown in the region. The northern or the upper part of the highland has tropical forest which is usually 30 m (98 ft) above the mean sea level. The regions receive a bimodal rainfall with a gap of two weeks in between. Cocoa, coffee, Lofa, bong, Nimba, rubber, citrus oil, and palm are the most common crops in the region.

== Demographics ==
As of 2008, the county had a population of 71,509: 37,224 male and 34,285 female. The sex ratio was 108.6 compared to 99 in the 1994 census. The number of households during 2008 was 15,829 and the average size of the households was 5. The population was 1.80 percent of the total population, while it was 2.10 percent in 1994. The county had an area of 2,183 sq mi and the density per square mile was 33. The density during the 1984 census stood at 17. Liberia experienced civil war during various times and the total number of people displaced on account of wars as of 2008 in the county was 24,318. The number of people residing in urban areas was 2,389, with 1,262 males and 1,127 females. The total number of people in rural areas was 69,120, with 35,962 males and 33,158 females. The total fraction of people residing in urban areas was 3.34 percent, while the remaining 97 percent were living in rural areas. The number of people resettled as of 2008 was 12,817 while the number of people who were not resettled was 2,253. The number of literates above the age of ten as of 2008 was 34,838 while the number of illiterates was 35,323 making the literacy rate 49.65 percent. The total number of literate males was 22,702 while the total number of literate females was 12,136. 75% of the population is Christian. Most of the rest are practitioners of animist faiths.

== Economy ==
As of 2011, the area of rice plantation was 4,960 ha (12,300 acres), which was 2.077 percent of the total area of rice planted in the country. The total production stood at 9060 metric tonnes. As of 2011, the number of Cassava plantations was 4460, which was 3.6 percent of the total area of Cassava planted in the country. The total production stood at 400 metric tonnes. The number of Cocoa plantations was 400, which was 1 percent of the total area of Cocoa planted in the country. The number of rubber plantations was 1420, which was 2.3 percent of the total area of rubber planted in the country. The number of Coffee plantations was 170, which was 0.8 percent of the total area of Coffee planted in the country.

As of 2008, the county had 1,570 paid employees, 18,807 self-employed people, 9,786 family workers, 844 people looking for work, 1,950 not working people, 5,379 people working in households, 10,784 students, 142 retired people, 703 incapacitated people, 411 part-time workers and 7,321 others, making the total working population of 57,697.

== Districts ==
The districts of the county include (2008 population): Bearwor District (3,854), Central Rivercess District (8,303), Doedain District (13,041), Fen River District (12,630), Jo River District (8,921), Norwein District (13,900), Sam Gbalor District (3,714) and Zartlahn District (7,146). The original districts in the province were Morweh District and Timbo District. The Legislature of Liberia was modeled based on the Legislature of the United States. It is bicameral in nature with a Senate and the House of Representatives. There are 15 counties in the country and based on the population, each county is defined to have at least two members, while the total number of members to the house, including the Speaker, is 64. Each member represents an electoral district and is elected to a six-year term based on popular vote. There were 30 senators, two each for the 13 counties and they serve a nine-year term. Senators are also elected based on a plurality of votes. The vice-president is the head of the Senate and he also acts as president in his absence.
