= Lawa River (Africa) =

River in West Africa

The Lawa River is a river in West Africa at 7.81623°N 9.98556°W. The river, which is approximately 100 kilometres (62 mi) long, originates in eastern Guinea south of Macenta. The river flows southwest into Liberia, where it enters the Lofa River in Lofa County.
