= Sierra Leone River =

River estuary in Sierra Leone

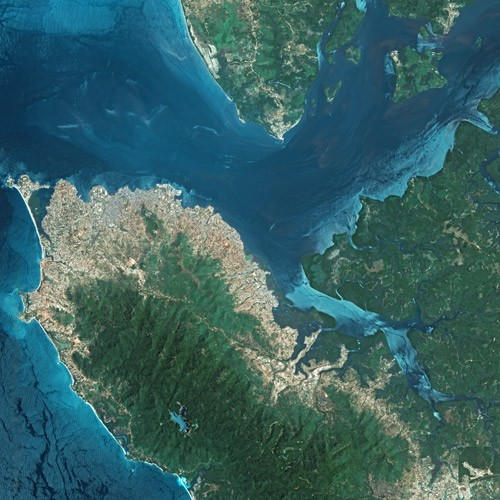
- Sierra Leone River Estuary

Physical characteristics
- Mouth
  - location: Atlantic Ocean
  - coordinates: 8.504°N 13.186°W
- Length: 25 mi (40 km)

Ramsar Wetland
- Official name: Sierra Leone River Estuary
- Designated: 13 December 1999
- Reference no.: 1014

The Sierra Leone River is a river estuary on the Atlantic Ocean in Western Sierra Leone. It is formed by the Bankasoka River and Rokel River and is between 4 and 10 miles wide (6–16 km) and 25 miles (40 km) long. It holds the major ports of Queen Elizabeth II Quay and Pepel. The estuary is also important for shipping. It is the largest natural harbour in the African continent. Several islands, including Tasso Island (the largest), Tombo Island, and the historically important Bunce Island, are located in the estuary.

== Lungi International Airport ==
The river separates Freetown, Sierra Leone's capital city, which is on the south side of the harbor, from the country's principal airport, Lungi International Airport, which is on the north side of the harbor in an area called the "Bullom Shore." The primary means of transportation from the airport to Freetown are by speed boat or ferry. Hovercraft and helicopter services are no longer running.

== Ecology ==
The 2,950 square kilometres (1,140 mi^{2}) of the Sierra Leone River estuary is classified as a wetland of international importance Ramsar Convention in the west of Sierra Leone. The area is mainly mangrove swamps but also includes tidal freshwater swamp forests. The site has also been designated an Important Bird Area (IBA) by BirdLife International because it supports significant populations of Eurasian oystercatchers, curlew sandpipers and hooded vultures.

== See also ==
- Protected areas of Sierra Leone
- Ramsar list of wetlands of international importance
