= Sinoe River =

River in Liberia

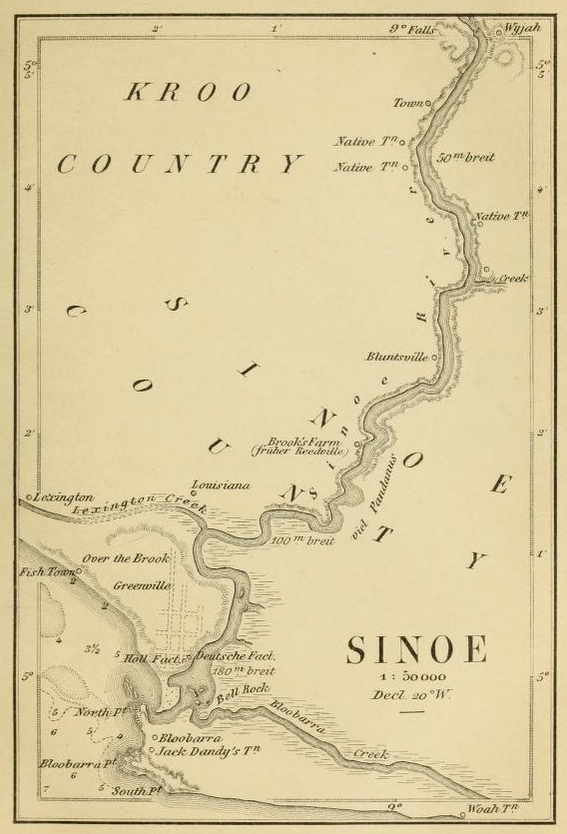
- Sinoe River

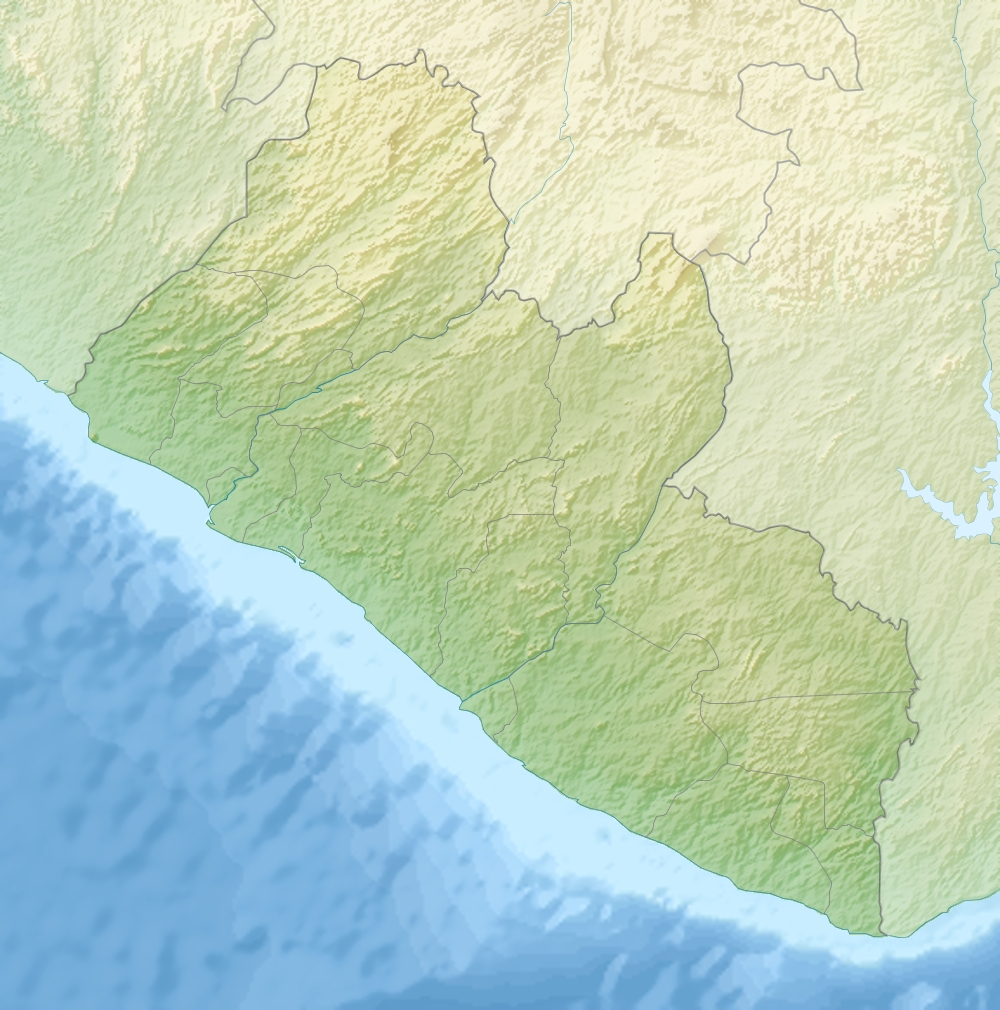
- Location of mouth

Location
- Country: Liberia

Physical characteristics
- Mouth
  - location: Sinoe Bay, Atlantic Ocean

The Sinoe River is a river of Liberia located in Sinoe County. It empties into the Atlantic Ocean east of Greenville at 4°59′37″N 9°02′12″W. The river forms the western boundary of Sapo National Park.
