= Saint Paul River =

River in West Africa

Coordinates: 6°25′N 10°43′W

- Location of the Saint Paul River

Location
- Countries: Guinea; Liberia

Physical characteristics
- Source
  - location: Guinea Highlands, Guinea
  - elevation: 960 m (3,150 ft)
- Mouth
  - location: Atlantic Ocean
  - elevation: 0 m (0 ft)
- Length: 485 km (301 mi)
- Basin size: 20,317 km^{2} (7,844 sq mi)
- Discharge
  - location: Near mouth
  - average: (Period: 1979–2015) 35.51 km^{3}/a (1,125 m^{3}/s)

The Saint Paul River is a river of western Africa. Its headwaters are in southeastern Guinea. Its upper portion in Guinea is known as the Diani River or Niandi River, and forms part of the boundary between Guinea and Liberia. It is known locally as the Du by the Gola people in Liberia.

The river then enters Liberia about 50 km (31 mi) north of Gbarnga and crosses Liberia in a southwesterly direction. It empties into the Atlantic Ocean at Cape Mesurado in Monrovia near Bushrod Island, separating Monrovia from its suburb Brewerville.

== History ==
The river was named by Portuguese navigators in the 15th century, who first sighted the river on St. Paul's feast day.

The river became important for the slave trade: Robert Bostock established a factory here.

Because the soil around Monrovia, Liberia was poor and the coastal areas were covered in dense jungle, many early African-American emigrants to Liberia in the 19th century moved up to the nearby St. Paul River, where they found land suitable for agriculture.

There they established small settlements. Also, American Lutheran missionaries set up the Muhlenberg Mission Station along the river, where they taught children various academics, technical/agricultural skills (especially the cultivation of coffee), and catechism. David A. Day introduced a steam ship to the river for the purposes of commerce and travel. The students at the school built it.

== See also ==
- Mount Coffee Hydropower Project
- Saint Paul Bridge (Monrovia)

General:

- List of rivers of Liberia
