= Lofa River =

River in West Africa

Lofa
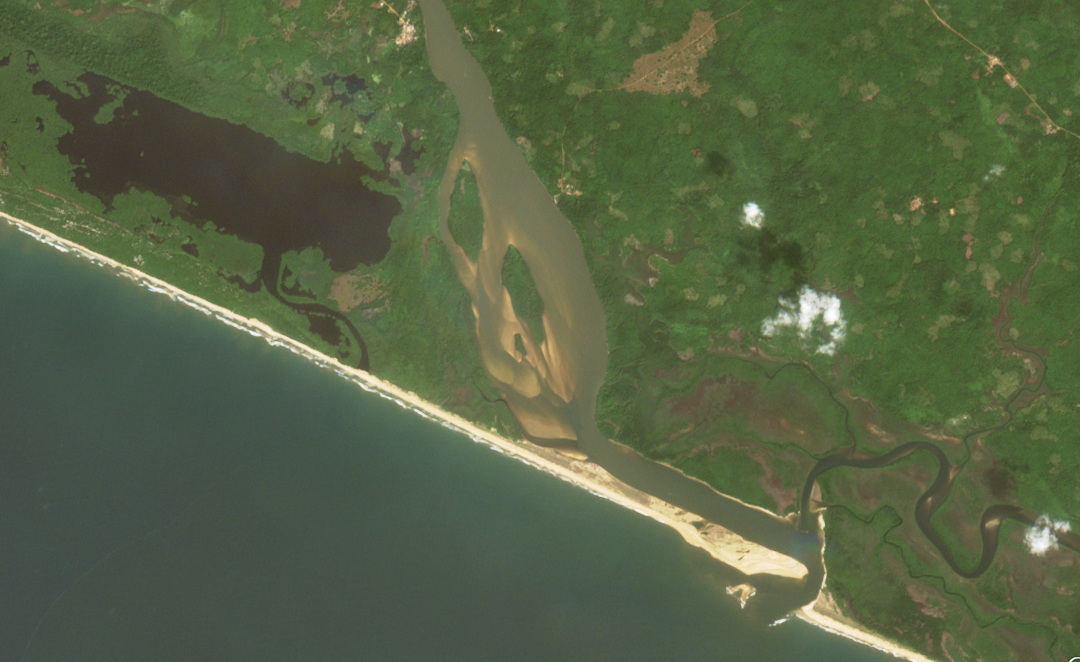

Location
- Countries: Guinea and Liberia

Physical characteristics
- Source
  - location: Macenta Prefecture in Guinea
  - elevation: 940 m (3,080 ft)
- Mouth
  - location: Atlantic Ocean south of Robertsport at
  - coordinates: 6°34′26″N 11°3′38″W
  - elevation: 0 m (0 ft)
- Length: 410 km (250 mi)
- Basin size: 10,446 km^{2} (4,033 sq mi)
- Discharge
  - location: Near mouth
  - average: (Period: 1979–2015) 18.63 km^{3}/a (590 m^{3}/s)

The Lofa or Loffa is a river whose headwaters originate in eastern Guinea northeast of Macenta. The river runs southwest through northeastern Liberia before draining into the North Atlantic Ocean. Historically it has also been known as the Little Cape Mount River. The Lawa River enters the Lofa River in Liberia's Lofa County.

Indigenous species include the pygmy hippopotamus. Several diamond mining concessions along the Lofa River were granted in the late 1950s and early 1960s.
