= Cestos River =

River in West Africa

Coordinates: 5°27′N 9°34′W

Cestos
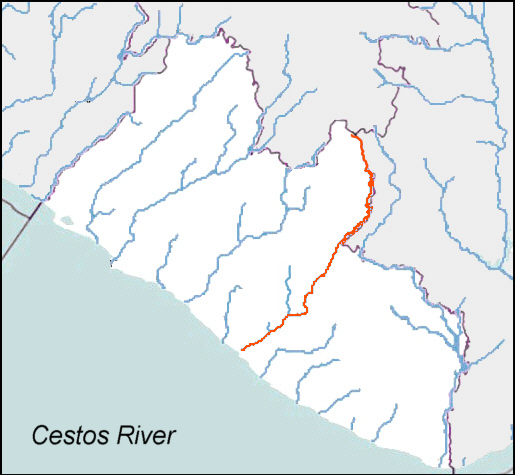
- Liberia Cestos River

Location
- Countries: Guinea; Côte d'Ivoire; Liberia

Physical characteristics
- Source
  - location: Nimba Range, Guinea
- Mouth
  - location: Atlantic Ocean
- Length: 476 km (296 mi)
- Basin size: 12,723 km^{2} (4,912 sq mi)
- Discharge
  - location: Near mouth
  - average: (Period: 1979–2015) 18.35 km^{3}/a (581 m^{3}/s)

Basin features
- River system: Cestos River

The Cestos River, also known as Nuon or Nipoué river, is a river that rises in the Nimba Range of Guinea and flows south along the Ivory Coast border, then south-west through tracts of Liberian rain forest to empty into a bay on the Atlantic Ocean where the town of Cestos is located. The pygmy hippopotamus is known to inhabit lands along stretches of the river. It forms the northern third of the international boundary between Liberia and Ivory Coast.

During the First Liberian Civil War, the portion of the river near the city of Cestos was a leading food and mineral extraction region for the National Patriotic Front of Liberia.
