= Rokel River =

Coordinates: 8.55°N 12.80°W

Rokel River: Seli River; Pamoronkoh River
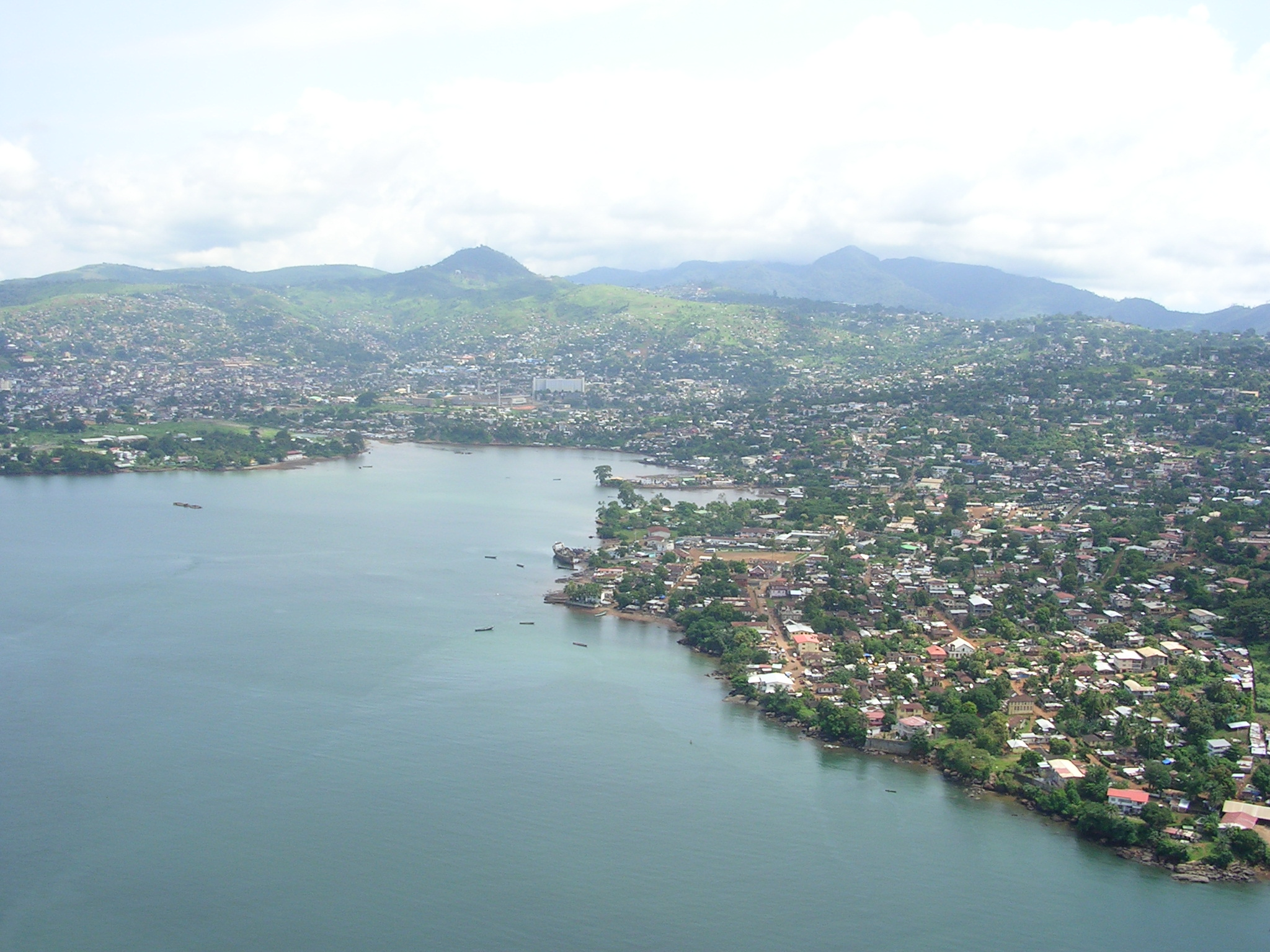
- Freetown at the mouth of the river estuary

Location
- Country: Sierra Leone

Physical characteristics
- Source
  - location: Loma Mountains, Guinea Highlands, Sierra Leone, West Africa
  - elevation: 900 m (3,000 ft)
- Mouth
  - location: Atlantic Ocean
  - elevation: 0 m (0 ft)
- Length: 386 km (240 mi)
- Basin size: 10,622 km^{2} (4,101 sq mi)
- Discharge
  - location: Near mouth
  - average: (Period: 1971–2000) 546.9 m^{3}/s (19,310 cu ft/s)

Basin features
- River system: Rokel River

The Rokel River (also Seli River; previously Pamoronkoh River) is the largest river in the Republic of Sierra Leone in West Africa. The river basin measures 10,622 km^{2} (4,101 mi^{2}) in size, with the drainage divided by the Gbengbe and Kabala hills and the Sula Mountains. The estuary which extends over an area of 2,950 km^{2} (1,140 mi^{2}) became a Ramsar wetland site of importance in 1999.

== Geography ==
The Rokel rises in the 900-metre-high (3,000 ft) interior plateau of the Loma Mountains, in the Guinea Highlands of north central Sierra Leone, flows southwest about 240 miles (390 km) through hill ranges and, together with a smaller, parallel stream called Port Loko Creek, feeds into the Rokel estuary before entering the Atlantic Ocean. The estuary, after it joins the Bankasoka River, is also called the Sierra Leone River, is 25 miles (40 km) in length and has a width of 4–10 miles (6.4–16.1 km). Freetown and Pepel are the two ports located on the shores of the estuary. As the estuary widens and joins the Atlantic its width is about 11 km (6.8 mi). The southern shore is the deepest and forms a natural harbour, which is reported to be the third largest in the world.

Mangrove swamps and the mud flats are the dominant ecosystem (accounting for 19% of the mangrove forest in the country) noted around the river's ria. The river basin measures 10,622 square kilometres (4,101 sq mi) in size, with the drainage divided by the Gbengbe and Kabala hills and the Sula Mountains. The Rokel drops 15 metres (49 ft) at the Bumbuna waterfalls. Mangrove species recorded are Rhizophora, Avicennia, Laguncularia, and Conocarpus, which cover an area of 34.23 hectares (84.6 acres). Sierra Leone's capital city of Freetown lies at the entrance to the Sierra Leone River, about 25 miles (40 km) from the port of Pepel.

== Geology ==
Rokel River and its tributaries are defined as the "Rokel River Group" for geological study. The geological formation in this group is reported to be of the Tabe formation with glacial sediments dominating its eastern edge and are exposed along the river in some stretches; the geological formation noted in the river is granite rocks. The formation is broadly categorized as folded sedimentary rocks. It is also reported that its orogeny belongs to the Pan African thermo-tectonic age of about 550 Ma. Geologically it is a tectonically controlled basin with formations of Precambrian, Infra-Cambrian and Pleistocene age. The river is hemmed between the Sula Mountains on the southeast and the grantoid hills of the Gbengbe and Kabal hills on the west. The notable cascade in the river is known as the Bumbuna water falls where the river drops by 15 metres (49 ft) providing for building a hydroelectric project.

== History ==
John MacCormac, an Irish businessman, settled on Timbo Island in 1816 and started exporting African Oak from the Rokel River. The trade was quite substantial for a while but eventually went into decline. Iron ore and alluvial gold mining began in the late 1920s and early 1930s, while the Bumbuna Falls hydroelectric project is underway. The Yalunka people established their capital, Falaba, near the source of the Rokel. The estuary, which extends over an area of 2,950 square kilometres (1,140 sq mi), was listed as Ramsar site of wetland importance in 1999. The site is bounded by Cape Point on the western side of the Freetown, by the Bunce River on one of its banks, and the Tagrin Point where areas of the Rokel joins at the southern end of its mouth.

In February 2025, Thomas Mariee completed a 365km solo packraft descent of the Rokel River in 17 days.

== Development ==
The Rokel river flow has been measured at three gauge stations. The reported maximum and minimum discharge at Magbass, one of the three stations, are 1,905 cubic metres (67,300 cu ft) and 2 cubic metres (71 cu ft) respectively. There are many projects developed in the river basin which derive their water supply requirements from this river.

The iron ore mining at Marampa is dependent on pumped water supply from the river. A Rokel River Water Rights Agreement (Ratification) Act was signed with the developers of the mines; the mines are in operation since 1933 to 1975 by Sierra Leone Development Company (DELCO) and Astro Minerals from 1983. The water agreement provides "exclusive and preferential rights to the use of the Rokel waters by special agreement" for a period of 89 years from 1 January 1938. The environmental impacts on the downstream users and disposal of tailings from the mining operations have not been addressed. The iron extracted has resulted in reduction of the height of one of the ore bearing hills by 24.4 metres (80 ft).

Gold mining in the Sula Mountains and in the Rokel river sediments was an extensive operation undertaken since 1929 in the river and its tributaries after gold was found in the mountains. Steam sediment studies were carried out for assessing the mineral concentration of arsenic. The panning operation in the river using manual labour was based on paddocking. This alluvial gold mining operation has been described as environmentally destructive as forest denudation for the purpose of mining caused extensive erosion of the hills and consequent sedimentation of the river and its tributaries.

The Bumbuna Dam has been developed on the river by building a 93 metres (305 ft) high dam in the narrow reach of the river, which has created a lake that stretches 30 kilometres (19 mi) upstream. The Magbass Irrigation Project was implemented downstream of the dam. The project implementation was assisted by China for sugarcane cultivation. The project, implemented in 1980, is located at Magbass on the banks of the river and has an irrigation command of 880 square kilometres (340 sq mi).

== Flora and fauna ==
The flora in the estuary consists of mangrove forest. The avifauna in the area consists of 10,000 birds of 36 species (1995 record). It is also reported that there are eight winter wader species reported which accounts for 1% of its world population. The eight species of palaearctic migrant waders recorded are:

- Ringed plover (Charadrius hiaticula)
- Kentish plover (Pluvialis squatarola)
- Sanderling (Calidris alba)
- Curlew sandpiper (Calidris ferruginea)
- Eurasian whimbrel (Numeniusphaeopus)
- green shank (Tringa nebularia)
- red shank (Tringa totanus)
- Western reef heron (Egrette gularis)

== See also ==
- Mabilafu, main village on the banks of the Rokel River

== Bibliography ==
- Bird, Eric (8 April 2010). Encyclopedia of the World's Coastal Landforms. Springer. ISBN 978-1-4020-8638-0.
- Brebbia, C. A.; Popov, V. (2013). Food and Environment II: The Quest for a Sustainable Future. WIT Press. ISBN 978-1-84564-703-2.
- Hambrey, M. J.; Harland, W. B. (2011). Earth's Pre-Pleistocene Glacial Record. Cambridge University Press. ISBN 978-0-521-17230-1.
- Rosbjerg, Dan (1997). Sustainability of Water Resources Under Increasing Uncertainty. International Association for Hydrological Sciences. ISBN 978-1-901502-05-3.
- Shillington, Kevin (2004). Encyclopedia of African History. CRC Press. ISBN 978-1-57958-245-6.
- Mangroves of Western and Central Africa. UNEP/Earthprint. 2007. pp. 41–. ISBN 978-92-807-2792-0.
