= Little Scarcies River =

River in West Africa

Little Scarcies
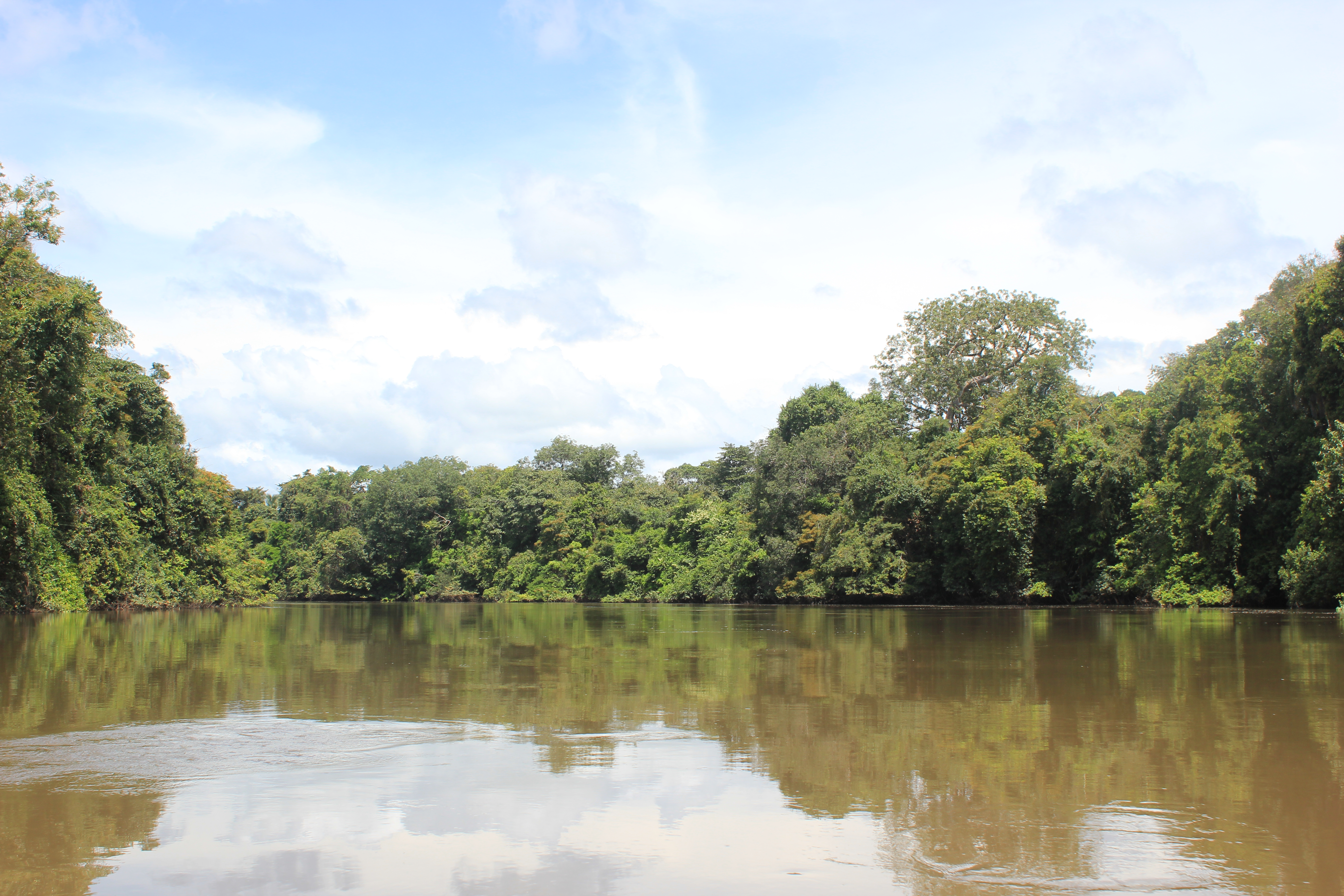
- Little Scarcies River in Outamba-Kilimi National Park

Location
- Countries: Guinea; Sierra Leone

Physical characteristics
- Source
  - location: Fouta Djallon, Guinea
- Mouth
  - location: Atlantic Ocean
  - coordinates: 8°54′00″N 13°11′00″W
- Length: 280 km (170 mi)
- Basin size: 18,552 km^{2} (7,163 sq mi)
- Discharge
  - location: Near mouth
  - average: (Period: 1979–2015) 30.52 km^{3}/a (967 m^{3}/s)

Basin features
- River system: Little Scarcies River

The Little Scarcies River is a river in west Africa that begins in Guinea and flows into Sierra Leone, after which it empties into the Atlantic Ocean. It is surrounded by extensive marshlands. The river is also known as the Kaba River.

The Great Scarcies River flows into the same bay of the Atlantic Ocean (8°54′00″N 13°11′00″W), just to the north of the mouth of the Little Scarcies River. This area was settled by the Temne people who migrated from Futa Jalon to the north.

An earlier alternative form of the name was Scassos; the English name is derived from the Portuguese Rio dos Carceres.
