= Kolenté River =

River in Guinea and Sierra Leone

Great Scarcies Kolenté
- Map of the Great Scarcies River Basin

Location
- Countries: Guinea; Sierra Leone

Physical characteristics
- Source
  - location: Fouta Djallon, Guinea
- Mouth
  - location: Atlantic Ocean
  - coordinates: 8°54′00″N 13°11′00″W
- Length: 257 km (160 mi)
- Basin size: 7,832 km^{2} (3,024 sq mi)
- Discharge
  - location: Near mouth
  - average: (Period: 1979–2015) 13.37 km^{3}/a (424 m^{3}/s)

Basin features
- River system: Great Scarcies River

The Kolenté River (also known as the Great Scarcies River) is a river in Guinea and Sierra Leone. The river forms a portion of the international border between the two countries. It empties into the Atlantic Ocean at Barlo Point, Sierra Leone. In Guinea, it is known as the Kolenté and in Sierra Leone, it is known as the Great Scarcies.

The Little Scarcies River empties into the same bay of the Atlantic Ocean just to the south of the Great Scarcies River. This area was settled by the Temne people who migrated from Futa Jalon to the north.
