= Owensgrove District =

Coordinates: 6°12′00″N 10°16′59″W

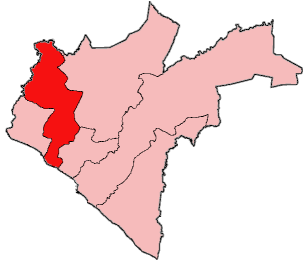
Location of Owensgrove District in Grand Bassa County

Owensgrove is one of six districts located in Grand Bassa County, Liberia.
