= List of Liberians =

Below is a partial list of notable Liberian people.

== B ==
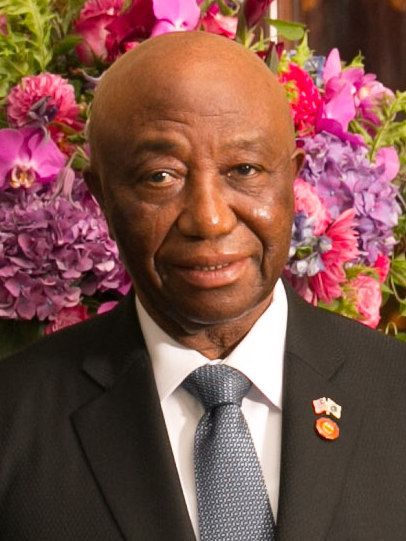
Joseph Nyumah Boakai

- Nathaniel Barnes (born 1954), politician
- Joseph Bartuah, journalist
- Martha Sandolo Belleh, politician
- Moses Zeh Blah
- John Bernard Blamo, politician
- Joseph Nyumah Boakai (born 1944), Vice President of Liberia
- Angie Elisabeth Brooks, diplomat and jurist
- Martina Brooks, journalist
- Mary Brownell, peace activist
- Mary Antoinette Brown-Sherman, educator and academic administrator
- Charles Walker Brumskine, politician and attorney
- Gyude Bryant, politician

== C ==
- Monie R. Captan, politician
- Alvin Chea
- Chea Cheapoo, judge
- Sekou Damate Conneh
- Al-Hassan Conteh, diplomat and academic
- Helene Cooper, journalist
- Alexander B Cummings Jr.
- Rennie Curran, footballer

== D ==
- Roland Tombekai Dempster, writer
- Charles Cecil Dennis
- Roland Diggs, politician
- Alvin Swen Dixon (born 1993), international footballer
- Nancy Doe
- Samuel Kanyon Doe
- Enoch Dogolea, politician
- Abdullah Dukuly, journalist and news editor
- Momolu Dukuly, politician and diplomat
- Cheryl Dunye, actress and director

== E ==
- Ernest Eastman, politician

== F ==
- Henry Boimah Fahnbulleh, politician and diplomat
- Michael Kpakala Francis, Roman Catholic prelate
- Comfort Freeman, peace activist

== G ==
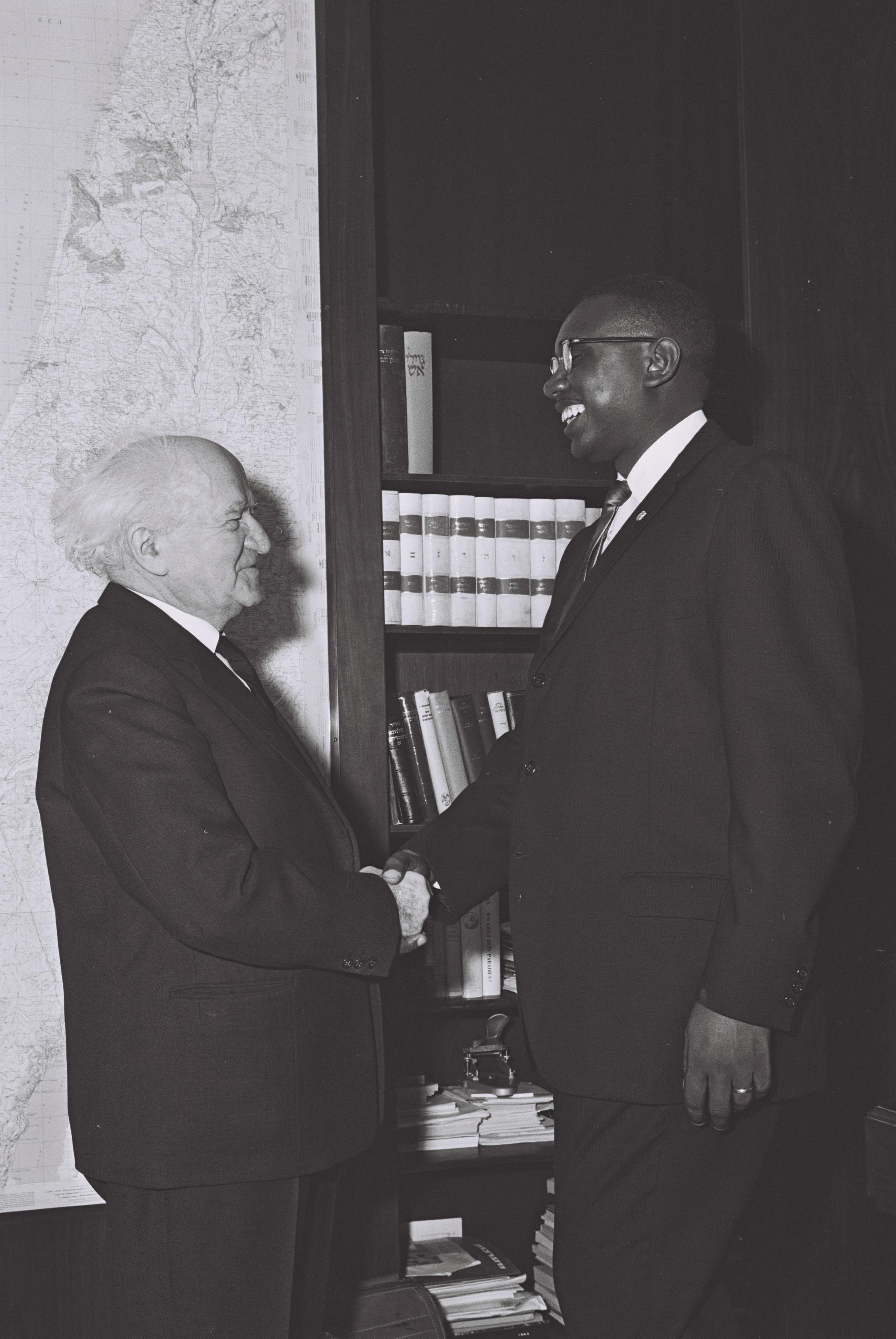
Joseph Rudolph Grimes, with Israeli prime minister David Ben Gurion in Jerusalem, Israel

- Leymah Gbowee, peace activist
- James Edward Greene, politician
- Joseph Rudolph Grimes (1923-2007), lawyer and statesman

== H ==
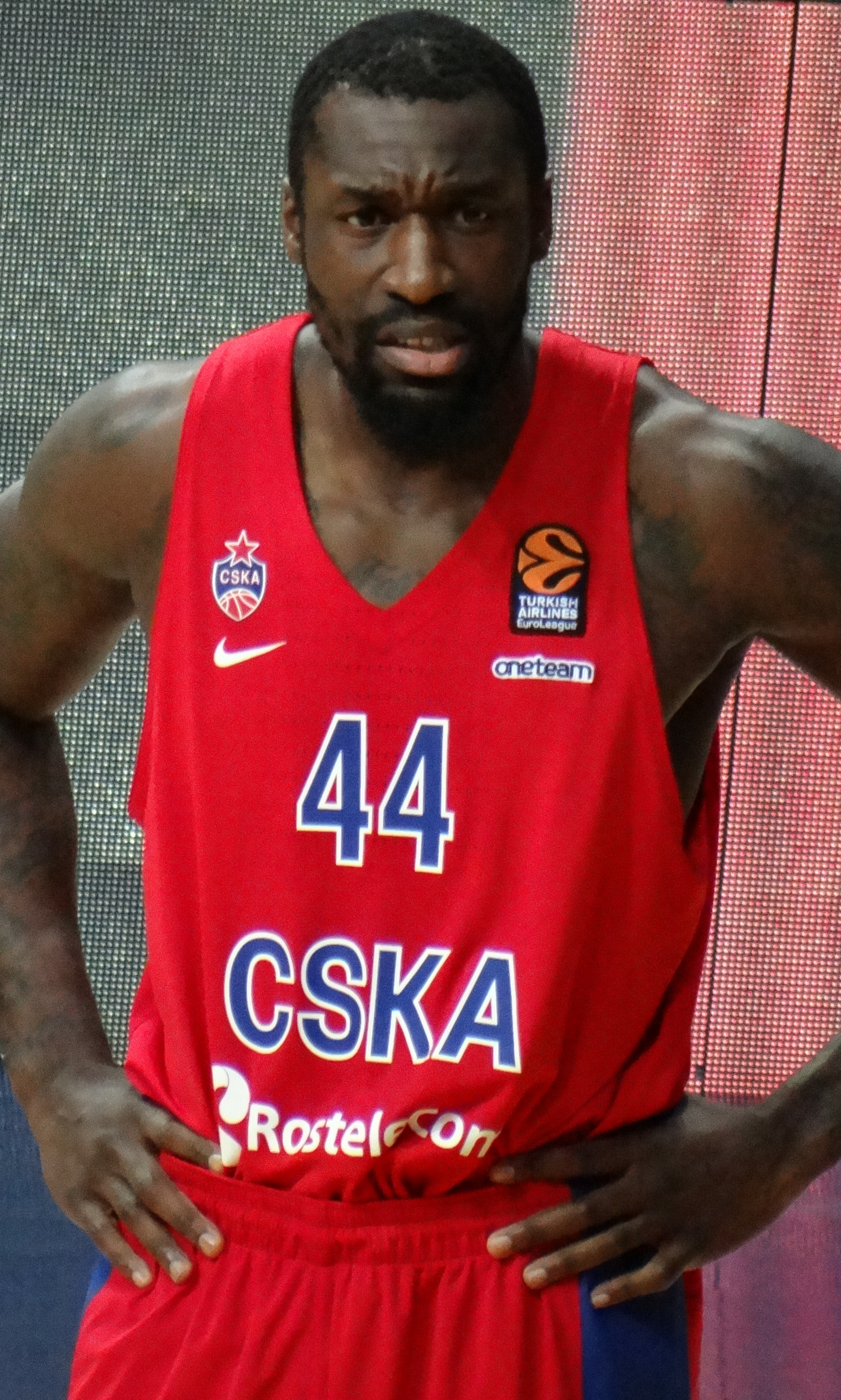
Othello Hunter

- Musue Noha Haddad, journalist
- Tamba Hali (born 1983), American football linebacker
- Sumowood Harris, bishop and peace activist
- Othello Hunter (born 1986), basketball player in the Israeli Basketball Premier League

== J ==
- Collins John, footballer
- Dulee Johnson, footballer
- Wesley Momo Johnson, politician
- Amymusu Jones, judge
- Bhawoh Jue, footballer

== K ==
- Abu Kanneh
- Francis Kateh
- George Klay Kieh
- Olubanke King-Akerele
- Kafumba Konneh
- David Kpormakor
- Robert Kpoto, politician
- G. V. Kromah, politician
- Nuzohn Zidenmaro Kulala, footballer

== L ==
- Benjamin Dorme Lartey

== M ==
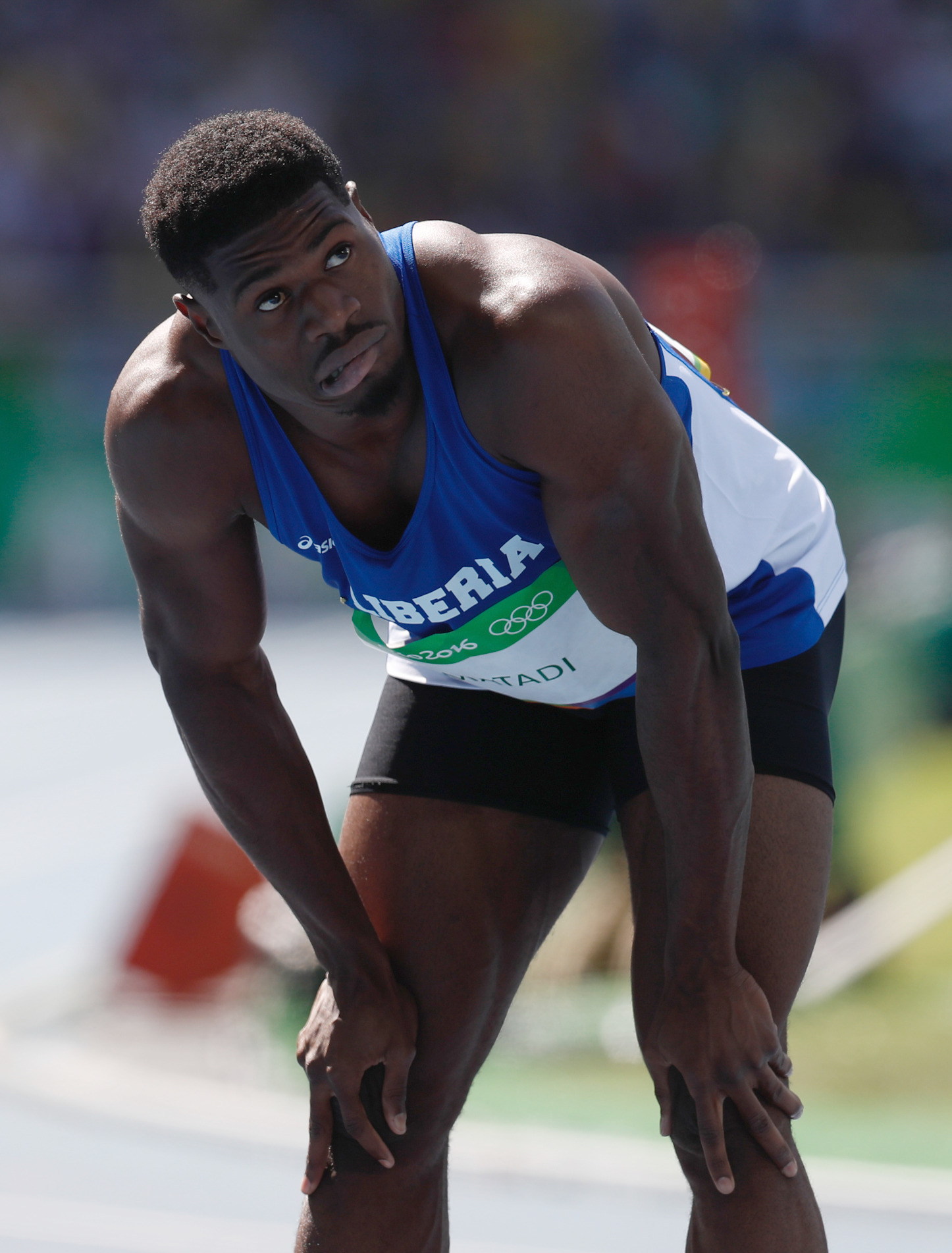
Emmanuel Matadi

- Mapei, rapper
- Emmanuel B. Matadi, sprinter
- Gabriel Baccus Matthews, politician
- Harry Fumba Moniba
- Bai T.J. Moore
- Lafayette K. Morgan
- Samuel C. Morrison, Jr.

== N ==
- Anthonett Nabwe, athlete
- Christopher Neyor, energy analyst
- Roselyn Nugba-Ballah, nurse
- Sara Beysolow Nyanti, pastor and politician

== P ==
- Dawn Padmore (born 1967), singer
- Ruth Perry
- James A. A. Pierre

== R ==
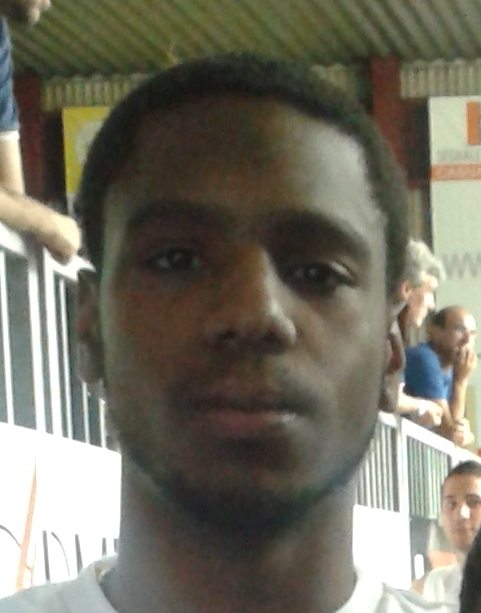
Joe Ragland

- Joe Ragland (born 1989), American-Liberian basketball player for Hapoel Holon of the Israeli Basketball Premier League
- Jane Roberts
- Joseph Jenkins Roberts
- Tecumsay Roberts, musician
- Alfred Francis Russell, politician

== S ==
- Elias Saleeby, banker
- Wilton Sankawulo
- Amos Sawyer
- Antoinette Sayeh, politician
- Ophelia Hoff Saytumah, politician
- Clarence Lorenzo Simpson, politician
- Clarence Lorenzo Simpson Jr., jurist
- Ellen Johnson Sirleaf, politician
- Momolu Sirleaf, politician
- Jeremiah Sulunteh, politician

== T ==
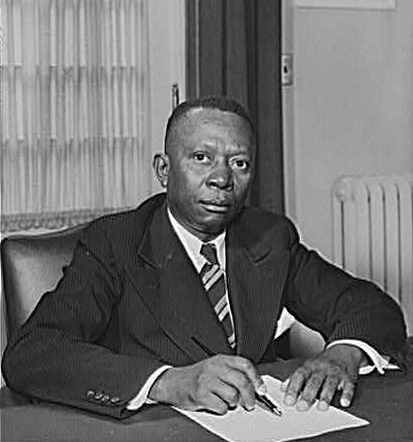
William Tubman

- Charles Ghankay Taylor
- Togba-Nah Tipoteh, politician
- Victoria Tolbert
- William Richard Tolbert
- Antoinette Tubman
- William Vacanarat Shadrach Tubman
- Winston Tubman
- Sultan Tucker, hurdler

== V ==
- Jerome Verdier, lawyer and human rights advocate

== W ==
- George Wallace
- Bennie Warner
- George Weah, politician and footballer
- Rocheforte Lafayette Weeks
- Henry Too Wesley, lawyer and politician
- Izetta Sombo Wesley
- Dioh Williams, footballer
- Stanton Witherspoon, media executive
- Samuel Kofi Woods, journalist
- Cletus Segbe Wotorson
- Joe Woyee, drummer
- Christopher Wreh, footballer
