= List of Americo-Liberian people =

This is a list of notable Americo-Liberian people.

The Americo-Liberian or Congau ethnic group has produced several notable politicians, businessman, and professionals including:

== Politicians and Administrators ==
- Wilmot Collins, Liberian-born American politician serving as the mayor of Helena, Montana
- Nathaniel Barnes, Liberian businessman and politician
- Charles Cecil Dennis, Liberian diplomat and politician
- C. Cyvette M. Gibson, Mayor of Paynesville, Liberia
- Louis Arthur Grimes, Liberian jurist
- Richard Abrom Henries, Liberian politician
- Elijah Johnson, Liberian pioneer and founding father of Liberia
- James A. A. Pierre, Liberian politician
- Charles Taylor, Liberian President and convicted war criminal
- Hilary Teague, Liberian pioneer and author of the Liberian Declaration of Independence
- Frank E. Tolbert, Liberian politician and businessman
- E. Reginald Townsend, Liberian politician and journalist
- Winston Tubman, Liberian lawyer and politician
- Clarence Lorenzo Simpson Sr., Liberian politician and former Vice President
- Kimmie Weeks, Liberian human rights activist

== Educators and Writers ==
- Edward Wilmot Blyden, Liberian intellectual scholar and Pan-Africanist pioneer
- Mary Antoinette Brown-Sherman, Liberian educator and first African woman to serve as president of a university
- Anna E. Cooper, educator, dean of the University of Liberia
- Helene Cooper, journalist for The New York Times
- John Payne Jackson, influential journalist in the Lagos Colony and founder of the Lagos Weekly Record
- Wayétu Moore, author

== Entrepreneurs and Businesspersons ==
- Romeo A. Horton, a founder of the Africa Development Bank
- Clarence Lorenzo Simpson Jr., Liberian judge and businessman
- Benoni Urey, Liberian businessman and the wealthiest Liberian
- Rhoda Weeks-Brown, General counsel to the IMF

== Scientists and Medical professionals ==
- Solomon Carter Fuller, Liberian pioneer and African-American psychiatrist and physician

== American-born presidents of Liberia ==
Americo-Liberians formed a cultural elite in Liberia that produced every Liberian president before 1980. The following presidents of Liberia, however, were born in the United States:

- Joseph Jenkins Roberts, first and seventh president. Born in Norfolk, Virginia
- Stephen Allen Benson, second president. Born in Cambridge, Dorchester County, Maryland
- Daniel Bashiel Warner, third president. Born in Baltimore County, Maryland
- James Spriggs-Payne, fourth and eighth president. Born in Richmond, Virginia
- Edward James Roye, fifth president. Born in Newark, Licking County, Ohio.
- James Skivring Smith, sixth president. Born in Charleston, South Carolina, Charleston County, South Carolina
- Anthony W. Gardner, ninth president. Born in Southampton County, Virginia
- Alfred F. Russell, tenth president. Born in Lexington, Fayette County, Kentucky
- William D. Coleman, thirteenth president. Born in Fayette County, Kentucky
- Garretson W. Gibson, fourteenth president. Born in Baltimore, Maryland

Also one Americo-Liberian president of Liberia was born in the British West Indies:

- Arthur Barclay, fifteenth president of Liberia, was born in Bridgetown, Barbados
