= Brumskine =

Brumskine is a surname of Liberian origin. Notable people with the surname include:

- Charles Brumskine (1951–2019), Liberian politician and attorney
- Charlyne Brumskine, Liberian politician
- Hannibal Brumskine III (born 1997), Liberian-American internet entrepreneur
