= Marjon Kamara =

Liberian diplomat (born 1949)

Marjon Vashti Kamara

Minister of Foreign Affairs of Liberia
- In office 6 January 2016 – 2018
- President: Ellen Johnson Sirleaf
- Preceded by: Augustine Kpehe Ngafuan
- Succeeded by: Gbehzohngar Milton Findley

Personal details
- Born: Monrovia, Liberia
- Education: Western Michigan University
- Occupation: Diplomat, Politician
- Awards: Dame Great Band and Chancellor of the Orders in the Humane Order of African Redemption

Marjon Vashti Kamara (born 13 August 1949) is a Liberian diplomat and politician who served as Minister of Foreign Affairs from 2016 to 2018.

== Early life and education ==
Kamara was born on 13 August 1949 in Monrovia to Jacob and Edith Kamara. She attended Saint Theresa's Convent High school and graduated from Western Michigan University with a Bachelor of Arts in 1970 and a master's degree in political science in 1973.

== Career ==
Kamara began working in Liberia's Ministry for Foreign Affairs in 1974, working closely with Cecil Dennis, before working at the United Nations High Commissioner for Refugees (UNHCR) offices in Ethiopia, Uganda and Geneva from 1983 until 1994. She was UNHCR's Representative to Angola from 1994–1998 and to Tanzania from 1998-2001. She then became Director of the Division of Operational Support in 2001, before being appointed Director of UNHCR for Africa in October 2005.

Kamara was appointed Liberia's ambassador to the United Nations in New York on 8 October 2009. She chaired the fifty-sixth and fifty-seventh sessions of the Commission on the Status of Women and was elected to serve as Vice President of the sixty-sixth session of the General Assembly.

Kamara was appointed Minister of Foreign Affairs by President Ellen Johnson Sirleaf on 6 January 2016.

== Awards and honours ==
In 2016, Kamara was made a Dame Great Band and Chancellor of the Orders in the Humane Order of African Redemption.

== Publications ==
- Kamara, Marjon Vashti; Plano, Jack C. (1974). United Nations Capital Development Fund: poor and rich worlds in collision. Western Michigan University Press. ISBN 9780932826145.
- Kamara, Marjon (September 2009). "Daring to dream of an end to exile in sub-Saharan Africa". Forced Migration Review. 33. Oxford: 30–32.
