= Vehicle registration plates of Nigeria =

Federal Republic of Nigeria
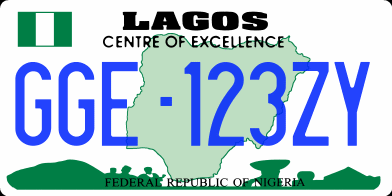
- Nigerian regular legal standard number plate from Lagos.
- Country: Nigeria
- Country code: WAN

Current series
- Size: 152 mm × 300 mm 6.0 in × 11.8 in
- Serial format: Not standard
- Colour (front): Black on white
- Colour (rear): Black on white

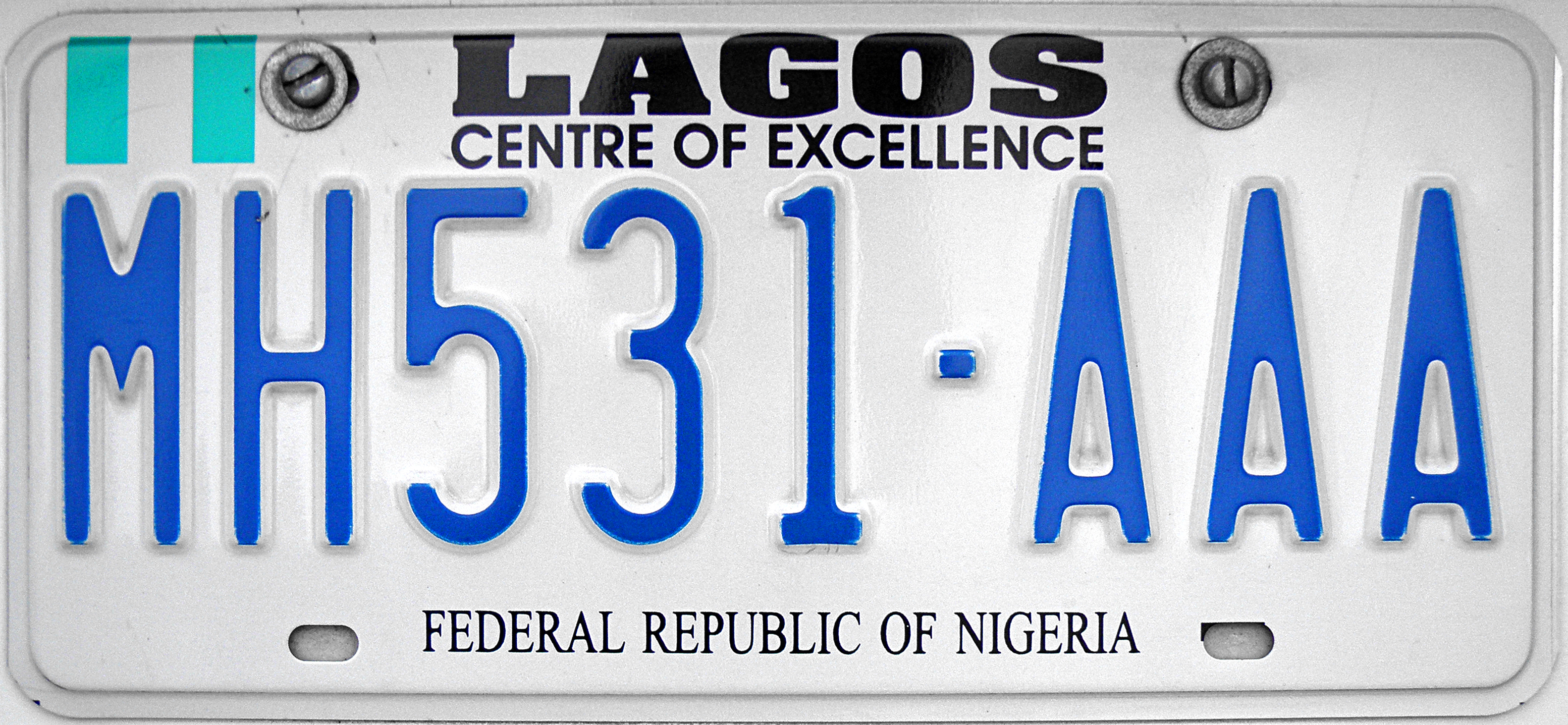
Former registration plate of Lagos (1992 to 2011)

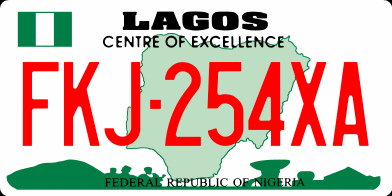
Commercial registration plate

Nigerian vehicle registration plates in current use were introduced in 1992 and revised in 2011. Nigeria, Liberia, and Somalia are the only three African countries that use the North American standard (300 mm × 152 mm [10 in × 5 in]), with Egypt using an approximately similar size (350 mm × 170 mm [15 in × 5 in]). The international code for Nigeria is "WAN" (West Africa Nigeria).

The license plates are generally white and the number itself is imprinted in blue. In the upper left-hand corner they carry the flag of Nigeria or the national coat of arms. The state name and slogan is displayed at the top centre of the plate, and the "Federal Republic of Nigeria" is written at the bottom.

The unique plate combination itself is in the format ABC-123DE. The first three letters indicate the Local Government Area in which the vehicle was registered, which are followed by three digits and two letters. The background consists of an outline of a map of Nigeria. Before 2011, the three letters indicating the Local Government Area were at the end, in the format AB123-CDE.

Other types of license plates are also in use. Commercial vehicles are written in red rather than blue, and government plates are in green. Diplomatic plates are purple and green with white lettering. The first two/three digits represent the country the owner of the car represents, followed by two letters and numbers. Instead of the name of the state, they read CORPS DIPLOMATIQUE. Cars of the consular corps have instead the letters CC or CORPS CONSULAIRE.

License plates of Nigerian states
Image	State	Slogan	Serial format
	Abia	GOD'S OWN STATE	
	Federal Capital Territory (Abuja)	CENTRE OF UNITY	
	Adamawa	LAND OF DAIRY or LAND OF BEAUTY	
	Akwa Ibom	THE LAND OF PROMISE	
	Anambra	LIGHT OF THE NATION or HOME FOR ALL	
	Bauchi	PEARL OF TOURISM	BA
	Bayelsa	THE GLORY OF ALL LANDS	
	Benue	FOOD BASKET OF THE NATION or THE FOOD OF THE NATION	
	Borno	HOME OF PEACE	
	Cross River	THE PEOPLE'S PARADISE	
	Delta	THE BIG HEART	
	Ebonyi	SALT OF THE NATION	
	Edo	THE HEARTBEAT OF NIGERIA or HEART OF THE NATION	
	Ekiti	FOUNTAIN OF KNOWLEDGE or LAND OF HONOUR	
	Enugu	COAL CITY STATE	
	Gombe	JEWEL OF THE SAVANNAH	
	Imo	EASTERN HEART LAND	
	Jigawa	A NEW WORLD	
	Kaduna	CENTRE OF LEARNING	
	Kano	CENTRE OF COMMERCE	
	Katsina	HOME OF HOSPITALITY	
	Kebbi	LAND OF EQUITY	
	Kogi	THE CONFLUENCE STATE	
	Kwara	STATE OF HARMONY	
	Lagos	CENTRE OF EXCELLENCE	LA
	Nasarawa	HOME OF SOLID MINERALS	
	Niger	THE POWER STATE	
	Ogun	THE GATEWAY STATE	
	Ondo	SUNSHINE STATE	
	Osun	LAND OF VIRTUE or STATE OF LIVING SPRING	
	Oyo	PACE SETTER STATE	
	Plateau	HOME OF PEACE AND TOURISM	
	Rivers	TREASURE BASE OF THE NATION	
	Sokoto	SEAT OF THE CALIPHATE or SARAKUNAN DAULAR USMANIYYA	
	Taraba	NATURE'S GIFT TO THE NATION	
	Yobe	PRIDE OF THE SAHEL	
	Zamfara	FARMING IS OUR PRIDE	

== Cost of new vehicle plate number by FRSC ==
List of services related to plate number registration:

- Number plates service cost
- Vehicle weighing and registration fee
- Change of ownership fee
