= Gbehzohngar Milton Findley =

Liberian politician and businessman

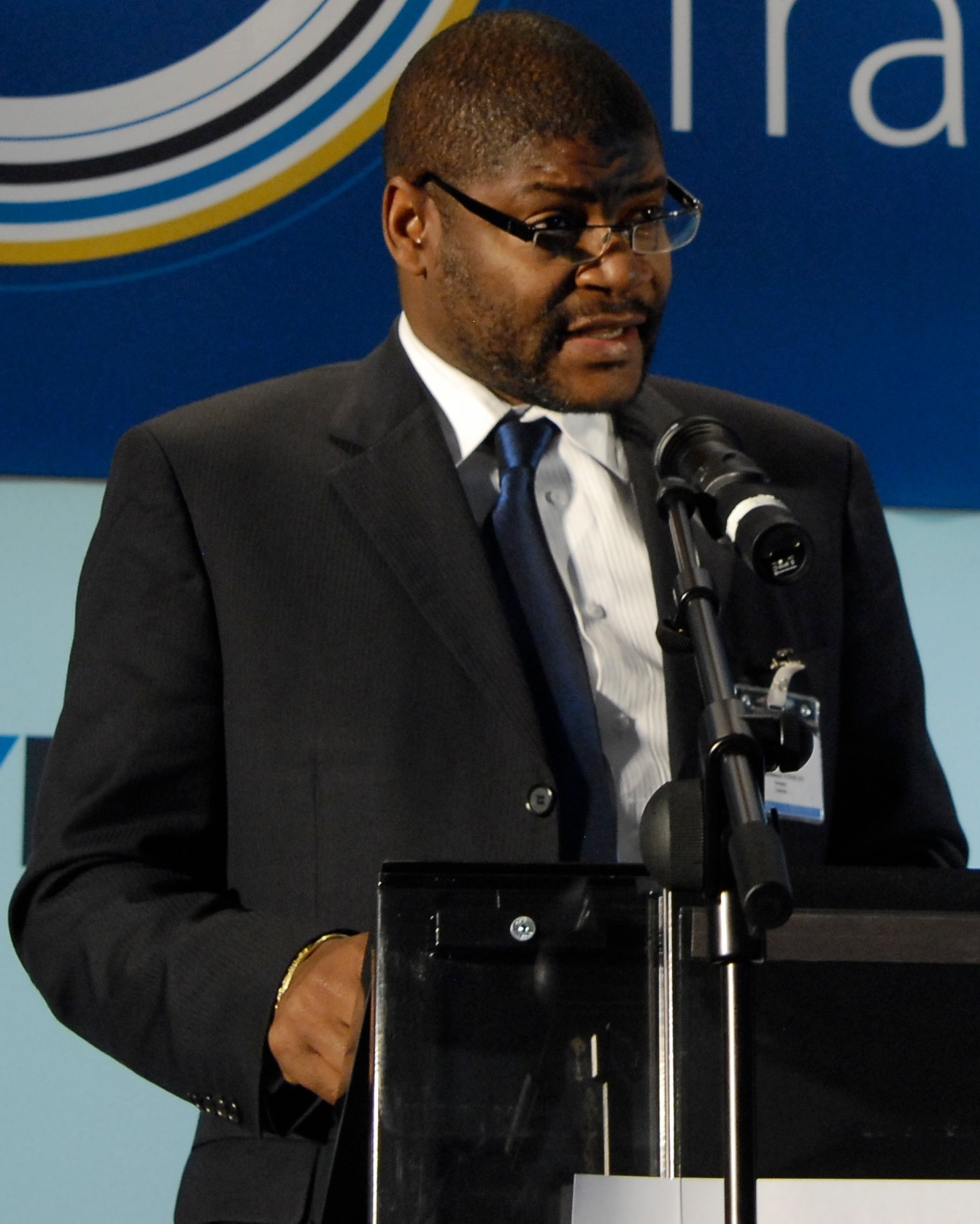

Foreign Minister of Liberia
- In office January 24, 2018 – July 28, 2020
- Preceded by: Marjon Kamara

President Pro Tempore of the Senate of Liberia
- In office January 2012 – January 2015
- Preceded by: Cletus Wotorson
- Succeeded by: Armah Jallah

Personal details
- Born: July 2, 1960 (age 66)

Gbehzohngar Milton Findley (born July 2, 1960) is a Liberian politician and businessman. He is a former President Pro Tempore of the Liberian Senate and also the Minister of Foreign Affairs in the administration of President Weah until 28 July 2020.

Findley is an owner of a coffee and cocoa bean farm and produce packing company in Liberia which exports its products to Europe.

On August 4, 2017, Findley resigned from the ruling Unity Party, declaring he and the party no longer shared the same political ideology. On August 16, 2017, he announced his intention to join the Coalition for Democratic Change (CDC) political party to support then-Standard Bearer, George Weah. Findley was welcomed to the CDC with Weah stating that "honorable Findley is an astute leader with an impeccable record of service to our noble country. He has contributed immensely to the governance process of our country and I believe he will be a great asset to our movement."

Findley and Weah jointly campaigned for the 2017 presidential election in Grand Bassa County, where Findley served as senator for nine years. They were received by a large crowd of supporters. The alliance proved successful for both, for Findley in thwarting the 2017 presidential bids of both his political adversaries, Charles Brumskine of the Liberty Party and Joseph Boakai of the Unity Party, and for Weah who edged Brumskine out of contention in the first round national election before defeating Boakai in the final election run-off.

In the 2023 general election, Findley was again elected to the Senate of Liberia as an independent.

== Early life and education ==
Gbehzohngar Milton Findley is the son of the late attorney, Joseph Henry Findley, and Gertrude Findley. Counsellor Joseph Henry Findley was a respected member of Liberian legal and political society as a circuit court judge and later, Senator of Grand Bassa County.

Findley attended primary school at Buchanan Demonstration Elementary School in Buchanan City and St. Peter Lutheran School in Monrovia. He graduated from William V.S. Tubman High School in Monrovia. Educated abroad, Findley has a Master of Science Degree from Lund University in Lund, Sweden and a Bachelor of Science Degree from Franklin University in Ohio, USA. As a student in the USA he served as President of the Association of Liberians in Columbus.

== Political and professional career ==
=== Minister of Foreign Affairs ===
On January 22, 2018, Gbehzohngar Milton Findley was nominated as Minister of Foreign Affairs, one day after President George Manneh Weah was sworn-in as the 25th President of the Republic of Liberia.

Findley received confirmation by the Senate Committee on Foreign Affairs on January 26, 2018 with a release of the report to plenary stating, “In consonant with the findings of the Senate Committee on Foreign Affairs of the 54th Legislature, and after scrupulous consultations with key stakeholders, former and current diplomats and administrative experts, the committee is pleased to herein recommend to the full plenary of the Senate to unanimously confirm nominee Findley, Minister of Foreign Affairs of Liberia".

Immediately following his confirmation, Findley joined President Weah on the administration’s first official delegation to the 30th African Union Summit held in Addis Abba, Ethiopia.

He resigned on 28 July 2020, to contest the Special Senatorial Election as representative of Grand Bassa county.

=== Senator for Grand Bassa County ===
Gbehzohngar Milton Findley began his political career running as an Independent candidate and later joined the ruling Unity Party. Findley was a Legislator in the Senate of Liberia for nine years beginning with the successful 2005 campaign. As a Senior Senator, Findley was elected President Pro-Tempore on January 9, 2012, defeating Senator Jewel Howard Taylor.

Senate Legislative Committees:

- Chairman: Senate Subcommittee on Revenue
- Chairman: Senate Subcommittee on Procurement
- Chairman: Post & Telecommunications
- Co-Chairman: Lands, Mines & Energy
- Co-Chairman: Public Autonomous Commissions
- Member: Education and Public Administration
- Member: Ways, Means, Finance & Budget
- Member: Agriculture, Fisheries & Forestry, Labor
- Member: Rules, Order & Administration
- Member: Statutory Committee on Executive
- Member: Joint Legislative Modernization Committee

As a Senior Senator, Findley was elected to the International Board of the Extractive Industries Transparency Initiative (EITI), an organization which promotes a global standard for management of oil, gas and mineral resources. Findley was a featured speaker at the EITI Global Conferences held in Paris, France in 2011, Sydney, Australia in 2013, and Lima, Peru in 2016.

=== Board Chairman of the Liberia Airport Authority ===
President Ellen Johnson Sirleaf appointed Findley to chairman of the board of directors of the Liberia Airport Authority (LAA) on May 2, 2015. The LAA is responsible for the managerial and operational control of all airports within the Republic of Liberia. The largest airport, Roberts International Airport (RIA), is presently served by seven airlines, including Brussels Airlines, Air Côte d'Ivoire, Kenya Airways, KLM Royal Dutch Airlines and Royal Air Maroc.

On July 4, 2016, Findley lauded Chinese Ambassador Zhang Yue at the ground-breaking ceremony for the new US$50 million passenger terminal building at RIA. He also congratulated President Ellen Johnson Sirleaf for her tireless efforts in championing the China-Liberia bilateral project. Construction was slated to commence immediately after the official groundbreaking on November 21, 2016 and scheduled to be completed in 22 months.

Findley oversaw a joint-venture financed by the Saudi Fund for Development, Arab Bank for Economic Development in Africa and the Government of Liberia for a US$30 million Runway Rehabilitation project at RIA. Ibrahim Al Sahi of the Saudi Development Fund and the Arab Bank has stated that modernization of the airport infrastructure in Liberia would attract more tourists and enhance the economic potential of the country. The contract was signed on September 5, 2016 and estimated to be completed within 10 months.

On July 24, 2017, Findley announced the National Aviation Services (NAS) of Kuwait would manage a 25-year air cargo operations concession at the Roberts International Airport (RIA). The joint venture between NAS of Kuwait and Liberian firm, Global Logistics Services, includes design, build, maintenance, operation and transfer of a new, modern cargo facility at RIA. The new facility will improve RIA’s air cargo operations to meet international standards and support export supply chain capacity in the country to improve trade barriers and boost Liberia’s potential as a hub in the Mano River sub-region and the rest of the world.

== Personal life ==
Findley owns a home and coffee and cocoa farm in Buchanan, Grand Bassa County and a home in the capital city, Monrovia, Montserrado County, Liberia.

== Contributions to Grand Bassa County ==
Senator Findley implemented a platform based on strengthening education, skills training and community infrastructure development. Findley spearheaded the development of the Grand Bassa County Community College where he served as a member of the board of directors. He also served on the board of directors of the University of Liberia.

Findley supported education by providing 123 scholarships for students to attend several universities in Monrovia and Grand Bassa Community College in Buchanan. He paid all West African Examination (WAEC) fees for all ninth and twelfth grade students for the 2012/2013 school year. During visits to the U.S., Findley lobbied for scholarships and student and faculty exchange programs at universities in the states of Maryland, California and Ohio. He donated personal funds towards the Barcorlin Women Skill Training Program.

Community investments include provision of personal funds to spearhead a micro loan program for small business owners in Grand Bassa County. Findley made financial contributions towards the construction of the Compound District #4 high school and a community latrine in the Tarr Bar Community in Buchanan. He donated over 200 bags of cement and other building materials towards the school construction project in Zadoegbo Town, District #4; the E.C. Church school construction project in District #4; the women and youth center building in District #2; and towards the completion of the Blezee Administrative District community hall in Barzi-Giah Town, District #3. In response to several deaths due to water borne diseases, Findley self-sponsored the construction of a hand pump in the Joe Quarter Community in Buchanan to provide citizens safe drinking water.
