= Minister of Foreign Affairs (Liberia) =

Foreign minister of Liberia

Minister of Foreign Affairs of the Republic of Liberia
- Coat of arms of Liberia

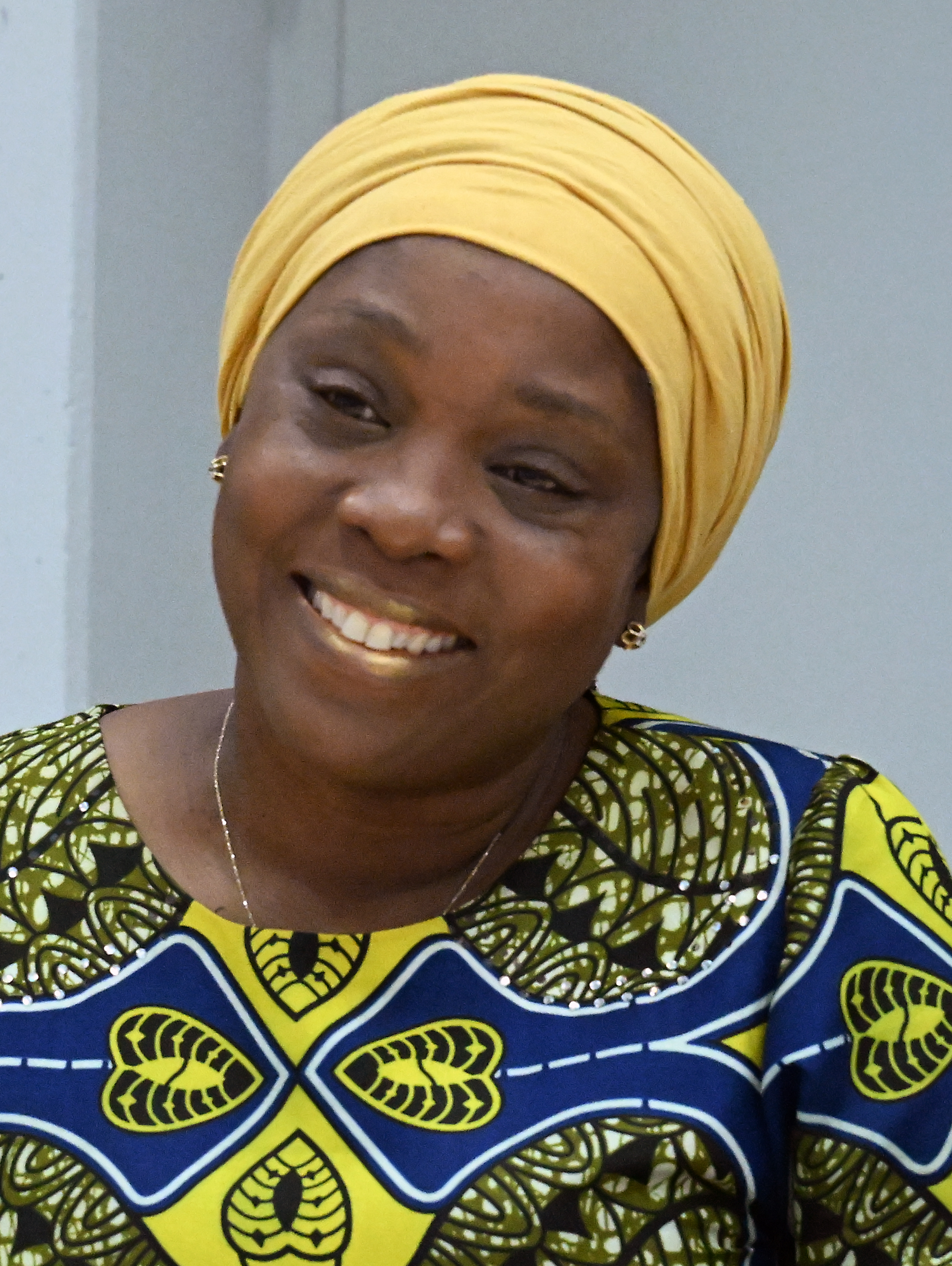
- Incumbent; Sara Beysolow Nyanti since 9 February 2024
- Ministry of Foreign Affairs
- Type: Foreign minister
- Member of: The Cabinet
- Seat: Tubman Boulevard, Monrovia
- Nominator: The president
- Appointer: The president
- Term length: No fixed term
- Constituting instrument: Constitution of Liberia (1847)
- Formation: 1848; 178 years ago
- First holder: Hilary Teage
- Website: mofa.gov.lr

The minister of foreign affairs is a cabinet minister of Liberia in charge of the Ministry of Foreign Affairs, a government ministry responsible for conducting foreign relations of the country.

Originally called the secretary of state, the position assumed its current name in 1972.

Between 1848 and 1981, every officeholder came from Montserrado County, Liberia's most populous county. The first individual to fill the post from outside of Montserrado was H. Boimah Fahnbulleh, Jr., who was originally from Grand Cape Mount County.

== List of officeholders ==
Status

Denotes acting officeholder

No.	Portrait	Name (Birth–Death)	Tenure	Title
1		Hilary Teage (1802–1853)	1848–1850	Secretary of State
2		John N. Lewis	1850–1854	Secretary of State
3		Daniel Bashiel Warner (1815–1880)	1854–1856	Secretary of State
4		James Skivring Smith (1825–1892)	1856–1860	Secretary of State
5		John N. Lewis	1860–1862	Secretary of State
6		William Highland Lynch	1862–1864	Secretary of State
7		Edward Wilmot Blyden (1832–1912)	1864–1865	Secretary of State
8		Hilary R. W. Johnson (1837–1901)	1866–1867	Secretary of State
9		John N. Lewis	1867–1869	Secretary of State
10		William Andrew Johnson	1869–1870	Secretary of State
11		John N. Lewis	1870–1871	Secretary of State
12		Hilary R. W. Johnson (1837–1901)	1871–1874	Secretary of State
13		James Elijah Moore	1874–1876	Secretary of State
14		James Skivring Smith	1876–1877	Secretary of State
15		John W. Blackledge	1877	Secretary of State
16		Hilary R. W. Johnson (1837–1901)	1877–1878	Secretary of State
17		Garretson W. Gibson (1832–1910)	1878–1884	Secretary of State
18		Ernest J. Barclay	1884–1888	Secretary of State
19		William McCall Davis	1888–1890	Secretary of State
20		Ernest J. Barclay	1890–1892	Secretary of State
—		Arthur Barclay (1854–1938)	1892	Secretary of State
21		Garretson W. Gibson (1832–1910)	1892–1900	Secretary of State
22		Walter van Dyke Gibson	1900–1904	Secretary of State
23		Hilary Wilmot Travis	1904–1908	Secretary of State
24		F. E. R. Johnson	1908–1912	Secretary of State
25		Charles D. B. King (1875–1961)	1912–1920	Secretary of State
26		Edwin Barclay (1882–1955)	1920–1930	Secretary of State
27		Louis Arthur Grimes (1883–1948)	1930–1934	Secretary of State
28		Clarence Lorenzo Simpson (1896–1969)	1934–1943	Secretary of State
29		Gabriel Lafayette Dennis (1896–1954)	1944–1953	Secretary of State
30		Momolu Dukuly (1903–1980)	1954–1960	Secretary of State
31		Joseph Rudolph Grimes (1923–2007)	1960–1972	Secretary of State
32		Rocheforte Lafayette Weeks (1923–1986)	1972–1973	Minister of Foreign Affairs
33		Cecil Dennis (1931–1980) (Note: Deposed in the 1980 Liberian coup d'état and executed afterwards.)	1973–1980	Minister of Foreign Affairs
34		Gabriel Baccus Matthews (1948–2007)	1980–1981	Minister of Foreign Affairs
35		Henry Boimah Fahnbulleh (born 1949)	1981–1983	Minister of Foreign Affairs
36		Ernest Eastman (1927–2011)	1983–1986	Minister of Foreign Affairs
37		John Bernard Blamo (born 1935)	1986–1987	Minister of Foreign Affairs
38		Joseph Rudolph Johnson (born 1938)	1987–1990	Minister of Foreign Affairs
39		Gabriel Baccus Matthews (1948–2007)	1990–1994	Minister of Foreign Affairs
40		Dorothy Musuleng-Cooper (1930–2009)	1994–1995	Minister of Foreign Affairs
41		Momoly Sirleaf	1995–1996	Minister of Foreign Affairs
42		Monie R. Captan (born 1962)	1996–2003	Minister of Foreign Affairs
43		Lewis Brown (born 1965)	2003	Minister of Foreign Affairs
44		Thomas Nimely (born 1956)	2003–2006	Minister of Foreign Affairs
45		George Wallace (born 1938)	2006–2007	Minister of Foreign Affairs
46		Olubanke King Akerele (born 1946)	2007–2010	Minister of Foreign Affairs
—		Sylvester Grigsby (1950–2025)	2010	Minister of Foreign Affairs
47		Toga G. McIntosh (born 1942?)	2010–2012	Minister of Foreign Affairs
48		Augustine Kpehe Ngafuan (born 1970)	2012–2015	Minister of Foreign Affairs
—		B. Elias Shoniyin	2015–2016	Minister of Foreign Affairs
49		Marjon Kamara (born 1949)	2016–2018	Minister of Foreign Affairs
50		Gbehzohngar Milton Findley (born 1960)	2018–2020	Minister of Foreign Affairs
—		Henry Boimah Fahnbulleh (born 1949)	2020	Minister of Foreign Affairs
51		Dee-Maxwell Saah Kemayah, Sr. (born 1965)	2020–2024	Minister of Foreign Affairs
52		Sara Beysolow Nyanti (born 1968)	2024–present	Minister of Foreign Affairs

== See also ==
- Foreign relations of Liberia
- Ministry of Foreign Affairs (Liberia)
- List of diplomatic missions of Liberia
