= Sylvester Grigsby =

Liberian politician (1950–2025)

Sylvester M. Grigsby
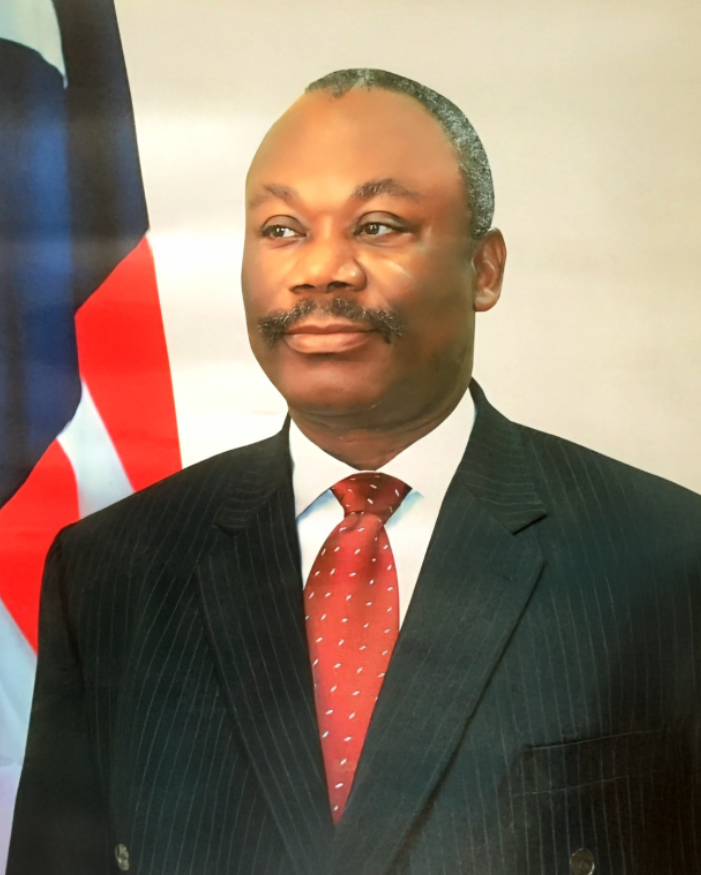
- Sylvester M. Grigsby

Minister of State for Presidential Affairs
- Deceased
- In office 22 January 2024 – 9 August 2025
- President: Joseph N. Boakai
- Preceded by: Nathaniel McGill
- Succeeded by: Samuel A. Stevquoah (Acting)

Personal details
- Born: 15 October 1950 Sinoe County, Liberia
- Died: 9 August 2025 (aged 74) Houston, Texas, US
- Spouse: Cleopatra S. Grigsby (m. 1974)
- Education: College of West Africa Cuttington University University of Tsukuba
- Occupation: Politician, Ambassador, Minister

Sylvester M. Grigsby (15 October 1950 – 9 August 2025) was a Liberian politician and diplomat who served as Minister of State for Presidential Affairs under President Joseph Nyuma Boakai and previously held the same position under President Ellen Johnson Sirleaf. Born in Sinoe County and educated at the College of West Africa in Monrovia, Grigsby had a distinguished four-decade career in public service, including roles as Acting Minister of Foreign Affairs (2010), Ambassador to Belgium and the Benelux countries, and various senior positions within Liberia's Ministry of Foreign Affairs. Known for his integrity, diplomatic expertise, and role as a trusted presidential advisor, he was instrumental in the establishment of Liberia's War and Economic Crimes Court and was regarded as one of the most experienced officials in the Boakai administration. Grigsby also founded the Sun Times newspaper in the early 1980s and served briefly as Superintendent of Sinoe County. He died in Houston, Texas, on 9 August 2025, at age 74.

== Life and career ==
Grigsby was born on 15 October 1950, in Sinoe County, and graduated from the College of West Africa in Monrovia. From 1970 to 1973, Grigsby attended Cuttington College & Divinity School in Suakoko, Bong County, Liberia, where he earned a Bachelor of Science degree in Chemistry. Cuttington, which later became Cuttington University. Grigsby first enrolled at Osaka University of Foreign Studies in Osaka, Japan, from April to September 1976. Grigsby completed his graduate education from 1977 to 1979 at Tsukuba University, where he earned a Master of Science degree in Economics. Tsukuba University, established as a Japanese National University, was known for its innovative approach to higher education and international programs.

== Early career and diplomatic service ==
Grigsby entered public service in the late 1970s and quickly became a fixture in Liberia's diplomatic corps. He served as Deputy Minister of International Cooperation and Deputy Minister of Foreign Affairs, roles that allowed him to develop expertise in international relations and diplomatic protocol.

During the early 1980s, Grigsby founded the Sun Times newspaper, which gained respect for its coverage of governance and human rights issues. This venture into journalism demonstrated his early commitment to transparency and democratic values.

One of Grigsby's most significant early appointments came during the Interim Government of National Unity (IGNU) under President Amos C. Sawyer, where he served as Liberia's Ambassador to Belgium and the Benelux countries (Belgium, Netherlands, and Luxembourg), where he strengthened ties with European partners and advanced Liberia's post-war reconstruction efforts. In this capacity, he also held concurrent accreditation to the European Union. This role during Liberia's transition from civil conflict showcased his ability to serve effectively during periods of national instability and reconstruction.

Grigsby also served as Superintendent of Sinoe County, his home county, where he was credited with successfully hosting the Sinoe peace conference, a significant contribution to the country's reconciliation efforts.

== Acting Minister of Foreign Affairs ==
In 2010, he was the acting Minister of Foreign Affairs under President Ellen Johnson Sirleaf. Grigsby served in that role from 5 November 2010 until 4 December 2010, when he was succeeded by Toga McIntosh.

== Minister of State for Presidential Affairs ==
Grigsby's transition from the foreign ministry to the Executive Mansion came when President Sirleaf appointed him as Minister of State for Presidential Affairs, filling the vacancy left by the death of former Minister Johnny McClain. In this role, he became one of President Sirleaf's most trusted advisors and was known for his meticulous work habits, arriving at the Executive Mansion by 8:00 AM and often working until 11:00 PM to ensure government objectives were met.

As Minister of State, Grigsby was responsible for managing the presidential cabinet and holding public officials accountable to their performance commitments. He was also recognized as a speechwriter and strategist, skills that proved invaluable in his advisory role.

When President Joseph Boakai assumed office in January 2024, one of his first appointments was Grigsby as Minister of State for Presidential Affairs under President. This marked Grigsby's second tenure in this influential position, making him the most senior Cabinet minister and widely regarded as the president's most trusted adviser.

== ARREST agenda implementation ==
Grigsby played a central role in launching President Boakai's ARREST agenda, focusing on Agriculture, Roads, Rule of law, Education, Sanitation, and Tourism. His experience and institutional knowledge were crucial in structuring the implementation of these priority areas.

== War and economic crimes court ==
One of Grigsby's most significant accomplishments was his instrumental role in establishing the War and Economic Crimes Court within just 110 days of President Boakai's inauguration on 22 January 2024.

== Comprehensive audit initiative ==
Grigsby also spearheaded efforts to conduct a comprehensive audit of the previous George Weah administration, aimed at retrieving state funds and assets allegedly stolen by former officials. This initiative was part of the broader effort to strengthen governance and restore the rule of law.

== Final years and legacy ==
Grigsby continued serving as Minister of State for Presidential Affairs until his death, remaining one of President Boakai's most trusted officials. He was described as providing crucial counsel on both domestic and international challenges, and his experience spanning four decades made him an invaluable asset to the administration.

The United States Embassy in Monrovia honored him as "a crucial, longtime friend and colleague," lauding his "invaluable contributions to strengthening the U.S.-Liberia bilateral relationship" and describing him as "a true leader and international statesman, who made Liberia and the world a better place".

Grigsby died in Houston, Texas on 9 August 2025, at the age of 74. His death was met with an outpouring of grief from across Liberia's political spectrum, testament to the respect he commanded throughout his distinguished career in public service.

Grigsby was married for 51 years to his wife Cleopatra, together they had two daughters.
