= Samuel Stevquoah =

Liberian politician

Samuel A. Stevquoah III is a Liberian politician.

== Biography ==
Samuel Stevquoah received a Bachelor of Science in political science from the United Methodist University, graduating with high honors. He then received a Master of Arts in administration from Framingham State University. He worked as reporter at Eternal Love Winning Africa (ELWA) ministries, later at the Liberia Broadcasting System where he worked in management.

Stevquoah was appointed to serve as Vice President Joseph Boakai's chief of office staff by March 2006. He served in the position until the end of Boakai's vice presidency in 2017. After Boakai's vice presidency, Stevquoah worked for ArcelorMittal from 2018 to 2024, serving in senior positions.

Boakai was elected president in 2023. Stevquoah was nominated by Boakai as minister of state without portfolio by February 2024. He was later confirmed. On August 9, 2025, Minister of State for Presidential Affairs Sylvester Grigsby died. Stevquoah was nominated to fill the vacancy in September. He was confirmed by the Senate in October.
