= Vehicle registration plates of Liberia =

Liberia requires its residents to register their motor vehicles and display vehicle registration plates. Nigeria, Liberia, Somalia are the only three African countries that use the North American standard 6 × 12 inches (152 × 300 mm).

Private vehicles are prefixed "A" (personal), "B", and "C", probably for cargo.

== Diplomatic Corps ==
The diplomatic fleet is identified by a code consisting of up to three numbers, followed by CD or CMD and another number.

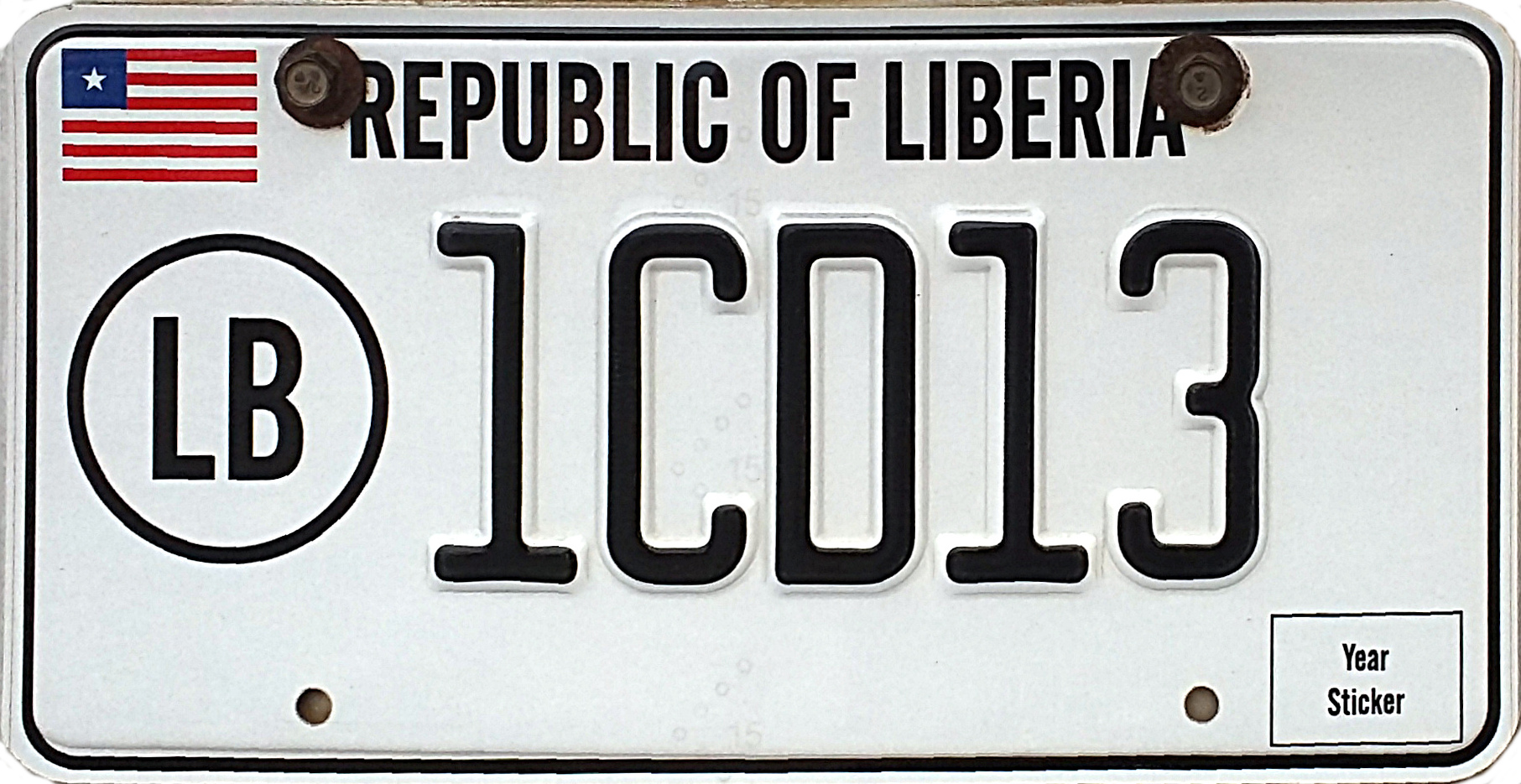
diplomatic license plate, February 2017

Code	Country or Organization
01	United States
02	Nigeria
03	Egypt
04	Guinea
06	Germany
10	Belgium
12	Côte d'Ivoire or Ireland
15	African Union
16	European Union
18	Brazil
20	United Kingdom
24	ECOWAS
25	Sweden
26	ECOWAS
29	Switzerland
41	UNICEF
46	UN Women
49	Food and Agriculture Organization
