= Lafayette Morgan =

Liberian economist

Lafayette K. Morgan (February 10, 1931 – April 26, 2005), former economic advisor of the Republic of Liberia, was an accomplished accountant and financial expert.

== Early life ==
Lafayette Kiejarlie (pronounced Kaijai, meaning "Red man" in Vai because he was very light at birth) Morgan was born on February 10, 1931, in the city of Buchanan, Grand Bassa County. His father was Grand Bassa Senior Senator Edwin A. Morgan, former chairman of the True Whig Party of Lberia, and his mother, Tarlo Jallah, hailed from Grand Cape Mount County. He is the father of Tupin Morgan. Morgan attended the College of West Africa, a leading secondary school in Monrovia, where he graduated in the 1950s. He briefly attended the University of Liberia, and later entered Babson College in Massachusetts, USA, where he took the Bachelor of Science degree in Finance and was the first African graduate in the school's history. He later matriculated to the University of Michigan at Ann Arbor, where he received the MSc. degree in Accounting and Finance.

== Public life ==
Following his return to Liberia in 1960 from advanced studies in Accounting and Finance in the United States, he served as an accountant in the Treasury Department of Liberia (now Ministry of Finance). He quickly moved up in the department, becoming Accountant General later that year. In 1962 he was promoted to Under Secretary of the Treasury for Fiscal Affairs, and in 1964 President William V.S. Tubman appointed him Economic Advisor. Morgan served in this capacity until 1973, when Tubman's successor, President William R. Tolbert, Jr., made him a member of the Cabinet, naming him Liberia's first Minister of State without portfolio.

== Business ventures ==
In 1975 he was appointed Manager of General Services of the Bong Mining Company, a position he held until the 1980 coup d'état that overthrew the Tolbert government. Shortly thereafter Morgan moved to the United States, but returned in 1982 to resume the operation of an accounting practice, which he had founded in 1960 as Morgan, Harmon and Otto. In that same year, he reconstituted the company, in partnership with David Farhat, also an Accounting professional and future Minister of Finance. The firm was renamed Morgan and Farhat. In the 1970s, Morgan also founded a travel agency and a computer services firm, which he ran until the war in 1990, when he returned to the United States.
