= Ernest Eastman =

Liberian politician

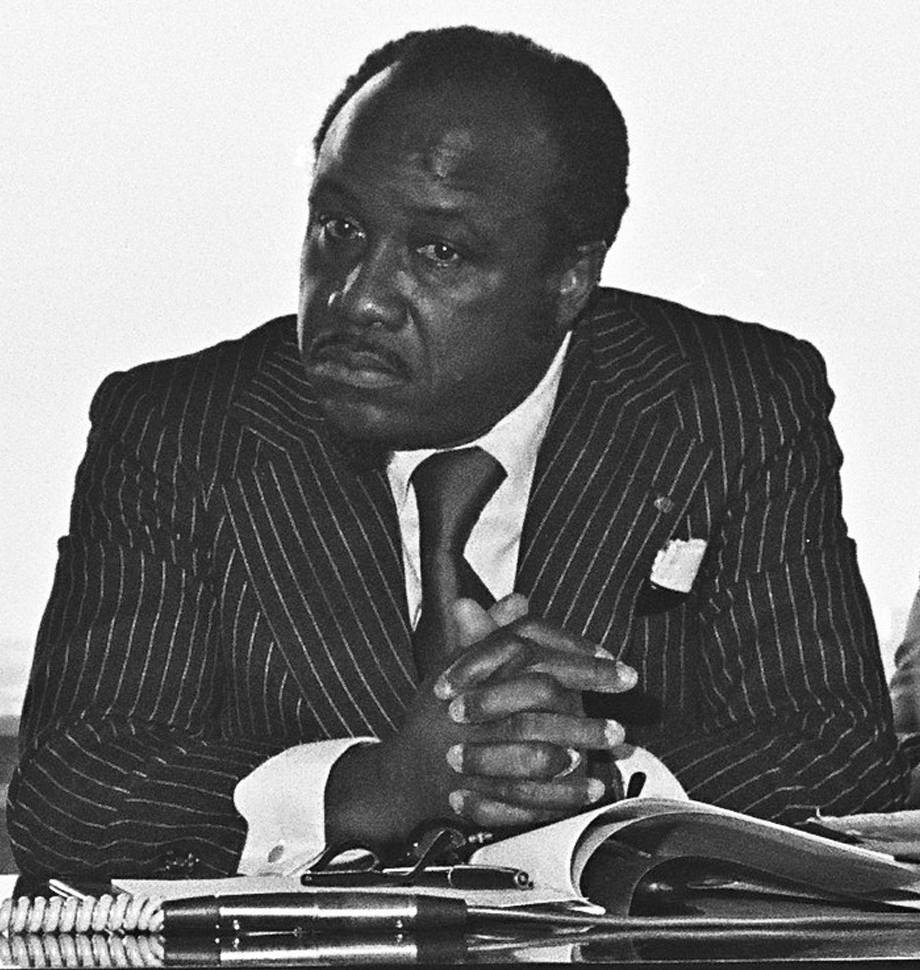
A financing convention was signed on 17 March 1978 by Claude Cheysson, Member of the CEC in charge of Development, and Ernest Eastman, Secretary General of the Mano River Union (MRU).

Theophilus Ernest Eastman (normally written as T. Ernest or Ernest) (March 27, 1927 – February 28, 2011) was a Liberian diplomat, statesman and politician. A leading member of the young and dynamic foreign policy team at the Department of State in the 1960s during the Tubman administration, he was a major architect of President Tubman's extensive involvement in Pan-African politics, serving first as Director of the Africa-Asia Bureau and then as Under-Secretary of State. In 1972, President Tolbert appointed him Ambassador to Kenya, Uganda, and Tanzania, resident in Nairobi, Kenya. He later served, from 1978 to 1983, as the second Secretary-General of the Mano River Union. From 1983 to 1986, he was the Minister of Foreign Affairs under dictator Samuel Doe, succeeding Henry Boimah Fahnbulleh and preceding John Bernard Blamo. President Charles Ghankay Taylor later appointed him to be the Minister of State for Presidential Affairs before returning him to the Foreign Ministry. He represented the National Patriotic Party at ECOWAS-sponsored peace talks in Banjul.

After graduating from the College of West Africa in 1947, Eastman went to the United States and attended Oberlin College, from where he received a Bachelor of Arts degree. He later received a master's degree in international relations from Columbia University. He was married three times: first to Erelia Eastman, a fellow Columbia student; second to Danielette Norman, a Liberian; and third to Salma Mohammed Ali of Kenya. A lifelong Methodist, he served for a time as one of the trustees of the First United Methodist Church of Monrovia.
