= Ann Wilkins =

American missionary teacher

Ann Wilkins (June 30, 1806 – November 13, 1857) was an American missionary teacher in Liberia. There, she founded the Millsburg Female Academy, which was the first U.S. Methodist girls' school established in a foreign country. Her work was sustained by the members of the New York Female Missionary Society.

== Biography ==
Ann Wilkins was born in the Hudson Valley, New York State, June 30, 1806. Her parents belonged to the United Methodist Church to which she converted at the age of fourteen.

She married Henry F. Wilkins at the age of seventeen. After he deserted her, she moved to New York City and worked as a teacher. She joined the Bedford Street Methodist Episcopal Church, where she also served as a teacher in the Sunday school. In 1834, she applied to the Missionary Society to serve as a teacher in Liberia, but no action was taken with her request.

In 1836, the Rev. John Seys had just returned from Africa and, alive with the sense of the need of the mission to Liberia, he presented the claims of the work at a revival meeting at Sing Sing, New York, to which followed up with a note to Nathan Bangs:— “A sister who has but little money at command gives that little cheerfully, and is willing to give her life as a female teacher if she is wanted.” When the Charlotte Harper left Philadelphia, June 15, 1837, she was among the passengers.

Once arrived in Liberia on July 28, 1837, her eagerness to do good and restlessness at any delay manifested itself in her beginning immediately to gather about her the people who were anxious to be taught. During her early months in Liberia, she taught at the White Plains Manual Labor School and at the Liberia Conference Seminary (now the College of West Africa). She also organized a school at Caldwell. In 1839, settling in Millsburg, Montserrado County, a town situated some 20 miles (32 km) from Monrovia, by the Saint Paul River, she founded the girls boarding school, which became the Millsburg Female Academy, over which she presided more than 18 years.

She sailed for Africa, the first time, June 15, 1837; returned to the United States in poor health in 1841; went to Liberia a second time, January 30, 1842; returned again in June, 1853; went to Africa a third time, October 25, 1854; reached the U.S. again April 23, 1857, and died in November of that year. During her visit of 1853, it was not expected that she would return to Liberia. But with restored health and increased strength, within a few months, she went back again, to assist the three women whom the Board was sending out to this field and to be with them in the beginning of their work. Her constitution had, however, become so frail by exposure to an inhospitable climate that she remained but a year and a half, and then crossed the ocean the sixth and last time.

== Later life and legacy ==
Wilkins accidentally broke her arm during her voyage back to New York City, arriving on April 23, 1857. The New York East Conference was in session at the time of her arrival, and her first appearance in public was at the ordination of ministers in Fleet Street Church, Brooklyn. Near the close of the sacramental service, which followed the ordination services, Bishop Beverly Waugh announced that Wilkins was present.

She lingered a few months after this, and died November 13, 1857. She was buried in the family cemetery on the banks of the Hudson River, near Fort Montgomery, and after 30 years. the property was sold. The person who purchased it declared his intention to remove the headstone and plow up the field. The Woman's Foreign Missionary Society of the Methodist Episcopal Church, learning this fact, passed a series of resolutions authorizing a committee to solicit funds to provide a suitable resting place and erect a simple monument. A site was donated by the trustees of Maple Grove Cemetery, Long Island, and the remains removed to it. The reinterment took place June 19, 1886, at which time a number of the members of the society were present. A memorial address was delivered by the Rev. John M. Reid, D.D. Upon the monument erected is the following inscription:— "Here lies Ann Wilkins, a missionary of the Methodist Episcopal Church to Liberia from 1836 to 1856. Died November 13, 1857, aged fifty-one years. Having little money at command, she gave herself. Erected by the Woman's Foreign Missionary Society."
