= Gabriel Lafayette Dennis =

Liberian politician

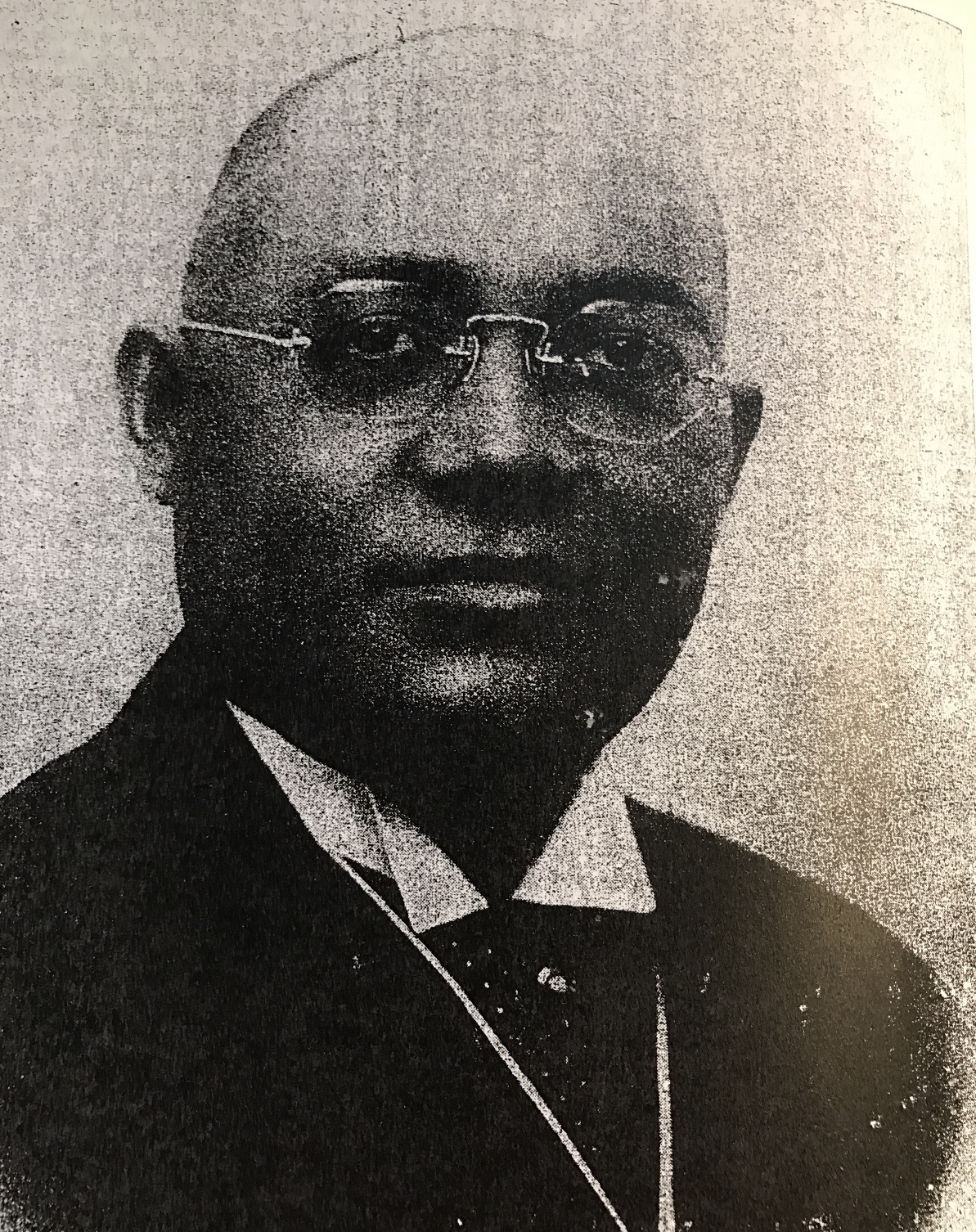
Gabriel Lafayette Dennis

Gabriel Lafayette Dennis (1896–1954) was a Liberian diplomat and politician. He and Louis Arthur Grimes were Liberia's primary delegates to the 15th assembly of the League of Nations in 1932. He was the Secretary of the Treasury from 1932 to 1940. In 1944, as World War II was ending, Dennis became Secretary of State under President William Tubman. He served in that position until 1953.

Political offices
Preceded by Clarence Lorenzo Simpson	Secretary of State of Liberia; 1944–1953	Succeeded by Momolu Dukuly
Preceded by John L. Morris	Secretary of the Treasury of Liberia; 1932–1940	Succeeded by ??
