= Samori Marksman =

Caribbean-born academic and activist (1947–1999)

Samori Tarik Marksman (October 27, 1947 – March 23, 1999) was a Caribbean Pan-Africanist, Marxist, journalist, historian, political activist, teacher, and program director of WBAI in New York from 1994 until his death in 1999.

== Biography ==
He was born Stanley Theodolph Marksman on the island of St. Vincent to Sybil Providence and Stanley Marksman.

He adopted the name Samori Tarik Marksman at the time he became a citizen of Guinea in the 1970s, his work with the Guinean revolution earning him the Croix de Chivalry. During this period, Marksman lived in Monrovia and taught at the University of Liberia and the College of West Africa while serving as director of the African division of the New York-based Pan African Skills Project, which recruited scientists and individuals with technical know-how to teach in Africa.

On his return to the United States, Marksman founded and published the magazine Caribbean Perspective. He was also a frequent contributor to Covert Action Quarterly and to the New York Amsterdam News. From 1979 to 1983, Marksman was a publicist for the New Jewel Movement Marxist-Leninist People's Revolutionary Government of Grenada, in which capacity he was a co-producer of the documentary film Grenada: The Future Coming Toward Us; his service ended with the US Invasion of Grenada. Marksman taught journalism part-time at Long Island University.

Marksman’s programs Behind the News and World View offered analyses of the news from a leftist perspective.

Marksman died in 1999, survived by his wife Rita and his children Lindiwe, Zindzi, and Kaifa.
