= Ministry of Foreign Affairs (Liberia) =

Government ministry of Liberia

Coordinates: 6.298492°N 10.796313°W

Republic of Liberia Ministry of Foreign Affairs
- Coat of arms of Liberia

Agency overview
- Formed: 1848
- Jurisdiction: Liberia and its diplomatic missions worldwide
- Headquarters: Tubman Boulevard, Monrovia
- Agency executive: Sara Beysolow Nyanti, Minister of Foreign Affairs
- Website: mofa.gov.lr

The Ministry of Foreign Affairs is a cabinet ministry of Liberia responsible for directing Liberia's external relations and the management of its international diplomatic missions. The ministry is located in Monrovia, Liberia's capital.

== History ==
The modern Liberian state was established by former American slaves and free African Americans that immigrated to western Africa in the early 1800s as part of the mission of the American Colonization Society. Much of the country's foreign policy philosophy is therefore derived from the same principles that guide United States foreign policy. Indeed, the ministry notes on its website that the "foundation [of Liberia's foreign policy] is copied after the pattern adopted by the United States of America from where the founding fathers of Liberia had come as ex-slaves and free men of color."

Liberia's Ministry of Foreign Affairs was established as a cabinet-level branch of the government in 1848, soon after the country's declaration of independence in 1847. Originally called the "Department of State", the ministry assumed its current name in 1972. The first director of the ministry was Hilary Teague, who also drafted the Liberian Declaration of Independence and served in the Liberian Senate.

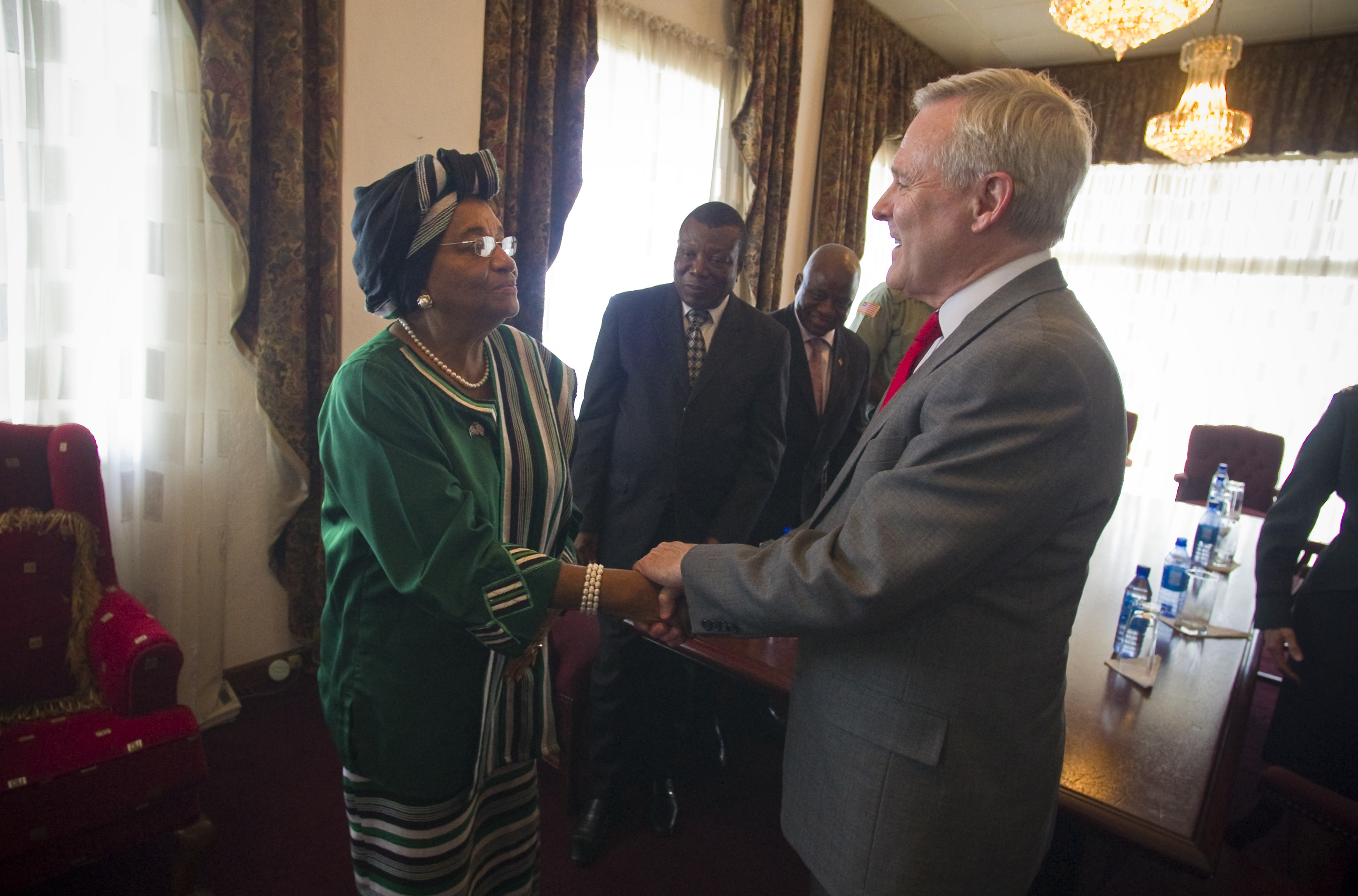
U.S. Secretary of the Navy Ray Mabus meets with Liberian President Ellen Johnson-Sirleaf at the Ministry of Foreign Affairs headquarters in Monrovia

Between 1848 and 1981, every Foreign Minister (formerly "Secretary of State") came from Montserrado County, Liberia's most populous county. The first individual to fill the post from outside of Montserrado was H. Boimah Fahnbulleh, Jr., who was originally from Grand Cape Mount County.

In February 2012, Augustine Kpehe Ngafuan, a member of the Unity Party was appointed as the minister. He was Dean of the Liberian Cabinet under President Ellen Johnson-Sirleaf.

== Diplomacy ==
The ministry maintains Liberia's affairs with foreign entities, including bilateral relations with individual nations and its representation in international organizations, including the United Nations, African Union, the World Health Organization, UNESCO and the Economic Community of West African States, among others. It oversees visas, some matters of public affairs and the Gabriel L. Dennis Foreign Service Institute, which helps to train Liberian diplomats.

Foreign diplomatic corps vehicles are issued with a unique set of Vehicle registration plates of Liberia.

== See also ==
- Foreign relations of Liberia
- Minister of Foreign Affairs (Liberia)
- List of diplomatic missions of Liberia
