= Rhoda Weeks–Brown =

Liberian economist & lawyer (born 1967)

- Born: 1967 (age 58–59); Cape Palmas, Liberia
- Education: Howard University (BA, Economics); Harvard University (JD)
- Occupations: Economist; lawyer
- Years active: 1991—present
- Title: General Counsel and Head of the Legal Department at the International Monetary Fund

Rhoda Weeks–Brown is a Liberian economist and lawyer who currently serves as the General Counsel and Director of the Legal Department at the International Monetary Fund (IMF). She was appointed to that position by the IMF Managing Director, Christine Lagarde, on 30 July 2018. Weeks–Brown, who previously served as Deputy General Counsel at the IMF, assumed her new position on Monday 17 September 2018.

== Background and education ==
A native of the West African country of Liberia, she is the daughter of the late Rocheforte Lafayette Weeks, the lawyer/politician who served as the president of the University of Liberia and Fannie Elizabeth Thompson-Goll, of Maryland County, Liberia.

She studied at Howard University, in Washington, DC, graduating with a Bachelor of Arts degree in economics. In 1991, along with the 44th President of the United States, Barack Obama, she was awarded the Juris Doctor degree, by the Harvard University Law School.

== Career ==
Following law school, Weeks-Brown worked for several years at the law firm of Skadden, Arps, Slate, Meagher & Flom, specializing in financial institutions regulatory matters, while there.

She joined the legal department at the International Monetary Fund in 1997. Over the years, she rose through the ranks to become Deputy Legal Counsel in 2010. She then joined the Fund’s Communications Department in 2012 as Deputy Director.

She replaced Sean Hagan, who led the legal team at the IMF from 1990 until 2018. He is expected to join academia, when he retires from the IMF at the end of October 2018.

== Advocacy ==
Rhoda Weeks–Brown is a member of the board of directors of Talentnomics Inc., an international non-profit that aims to increase women leadership worldwide and to eliminate the gender gap in hiring and remuneration.
