= List of presidents pro tempore of the Senate of Liberia =

This is an incomplete list of presidents pro tempore of the Senate of Liberia. The Senate elects a president pro tempore to preside for a term of six years.

Name	Took office	Left office	Notes
Elijah Johnson	1848	1849	
John Day	1849	?	
Alfred Francis Russell	1856	1857 – ?	
John Marshall	1871	1872 – ?	
J. J. Ross	? – 1896	1896 – ?	
Alfred Benedict King	1897	1899	
R. H. Jackson	1899	1901	
D. F. Worrell	1901	1901	
Alfred Benedict King	1901	1903	
J. C. Johnson	1903	1905	
T. I. Tate	1905	1907	
Charles B. Dunbar	1919	1923	
John Gottlieb A. Richards	1923	1927	
W. J. Clark	?	?	
William V. S. Tubman	? – 1930	1931	
James Agea Himie Jones	1944	1956	
Edwin Alford Morgan	1956	1958	
J. Lemuel Gibson	1958	1964	
James Norman Anderson	1964	1967	
Isaac A. David	1967	1971	
Frank E. Tolbert, Sr.	1972	1980	
No Senate	1980	1986	
John G. Rancy	1986	1989	
Keikura Bayoh Kpoto	February 1989	September 1990	
No Senate	1990	1997	
Charles Walker Brumskine	July 1997	August 1999	
Keikura Bayoh Kpoto	1999	20 August 2002	
Grace B. Minor	September 2002	2003	
John Gray (acting)	2003	11 August 2003	
Jucontee Thomas Woewiyu (acting)	11 August 2003	14 October 2003	
?	2003	2006	
Isaac W. Nyenabo	13 January 2006	17 March 2009	
Lahai G. Lansanah (acting)	20 August 2008	2009	
Cletus S. Wotorson (acting)	26 March 2009	January 2012	
Gbehzohngar Milton Findley	January 2012	January 2015	
Armah Jallah	12 February 2015	15 January 2018	
Albert Tugbe Chie	15 January 2018	15 January 2024	
Nyonblee Karnga-Lawrence	15 February 2024	Incumbent	
