= Romeo A. Horton =

Liberian banker

- Born: 1923; Monrovia, Liberia
- Died: 2005 (aged 81–82)
- Occupations: Civil servant, banker, and economist

Romeo Alexander Horton (1923–2005) was a Liberian economist, banker, and civil servant. (Note: Horton disputed the label Americo-Liberian and referred to himself as Liberian.) Horton conceived the idea of the African Development Bank and was one of the founders of the bank.

== Early life ==
Romeo Horton was born to Reverend Daniel Horton, a Jamaican minister, and Ora Milner Horton, an African American from Georgia on August 20, 1923, in Monrovia, Liberia. Horton began his education at the Ricks Institute in Virginia, Liberia, under the tutelage of his father who was principal. Horton's father transferred to the Booker Washington Institute (specifically to the Agriculture Department) and Horton also enrolled there and graduated his eighth grade class in 1937. Horton graduated from Morehouse College in Atlanta, Georgia.

== Professional career ==
As a businessman, he was the founder and president of the Bank of Liberia. He briefly served as the president of Liberia National Airlines.

As a civil servant, he served as an economic advisor to William Tubman, the 19th president of Liberia, before he was promoted to Secretary of Commerce, Industry and Labor. He was the chairman of the Liberia Elections Support Group and the managing director of the Economic Community of West African States.

His memoir, For Country, Africa, and My People was published in 2004.

== See also ==
- Running Africa
