= Augustine Kpehe Ngafuan =

Liberian politician (born 1970)

Minister of Finance of Liberia
- Incumbent
- Assumed office September 2024
- President: Joseph Boakai
- In office August 2008 – February 2012
- President: Ellen Johnson Sirleaf
- Preceded by: Antoinette Sayeh
- Succeeded by: Amara Konneh

Minister of Foreign Affairs of Liberia
- In office February 10, 2012 – October 2, 2015
- President: Ellen Johnson-Sirleaf
- Preceded by: Toga G. McIntosh
- Succeeded by: B. Elias Shoniyin

Personal details
- Born: Augustine Kpehe Ngafuan; April 7, 1970 (age 56) Monrovia, Liberia
- Party: UP
- Other political affiliations: VCP (2016-2017)
- Education: University of Liberia; University of Rochester
- Profession: Finance
- Website: Official Ministry website

Augustine Kpehe Ngafuan (born April 7, 1970) is Liberia’s current Minister of Finance and Development Planning. He previously served from 2012 to 2015 as the Minister of Foreign Affairs of Liberia, in the administration of President Ellen Johnson-Sirleaf. Ngafuan was Minister of Finance for Liberia during Johnson-Sirleaf's first term, and was then appointed to his post at the Ministry of Foreign Affairs on January 17, 2012. He took office on February 10, 2012, succeeding Toga McIntosh.

In October 2015, Ngafuan resigned as foreign minister. He planned to contest the 2017 presidential election and was required to resign his post to comply with the National Code of Conduct. In April 2016, Ngafuan resigned from the Unity Party (UP). On October 22, 2016, Ngafuan, along with his supporters, joined the Victory for Change Party (VCP). By November, there had been rumors circulating that VCP Standard Bearer Marcus Jones had sold the VCP's ticket to Ngafuan. Both Jones and Ngafuan denied the allegation. Jones further stated that Ngafuan was not qualified under the VCP's constitution to run for any position with the party, as he had joined the party too recently. VCP Chairman Emmanuel Tulay later stated there was no such qualification for candidates in the VCP's constitution. In May 2017, Ngafuan had stated that he was no longer seeking the presidency, not wanting to run against the UP candidate, Vice President Joseph Boakai. He gave his endorsement to Boakai. By August 2017, Ngafuan had re-joined the UP.

Ngafuan was appointed as minister of finance and development planning by President Joseph Boakai. He was confirmed by the Senate in September 2024. In 2025 he promoted a Digital Public Infrastructure project in Liberia, funded by World Bank.

== See also ==
- Foreign relations of Liberia
