= Garretson W. Gibson =

President of Liberia from 1900 to 1904

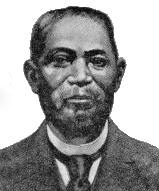

14th President of Liberia
- In office December 11, 1900 – January 4, 1904
- Vice President: Vacant (1900–1902); Joseph D. Summerville (1902–1904)
- Preceded by: William D. Coleman
- Succeeded by: Arthur Barclay

17th and 21st Secretary of State of Liberia
- In office 1878–1884
- President: Anthony W. Gardner; Alfred Francis Russell
- Preceded by: Hilary R. W. Johnson
- Succeeded by: Ernest J. Barclay
- In office 1892–1900
- President: Joseph James Cheeseman; William D. Coleman
- Preceded by: Arthur Barclay
- Succeeded by: Walter van Dyke Gibson

Personal details
- Born: May 20, 1832 Baltimore, Maryland, United States
- Died: April 26, 1910 (aged 77) Monrovia, Liberia
- Party: True Whig

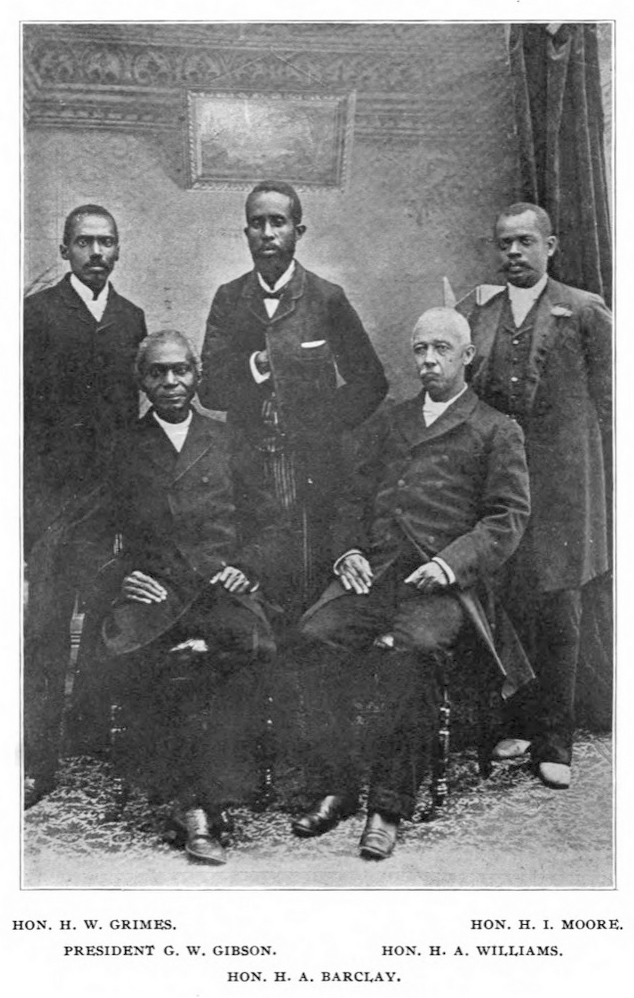
President Gibson and members of the Cabinet in 1903.

Garretson Warner Gibson (May 20, 1832 – April 26, 1910) was the 14th president of Liberia from 1900 to 1904. Born in Baltimore, Maryland, United States, his family emigrated to Liberia in 1845. After receiving an education in mission schools, he returned to Maryland to study theology. Ordained a priest, he served as rector of the Episcopalian Trinity Church in Monrovia. He also served as Chaplain of the Liberian Senate. Later, he served as President of the Trustee Board of Liberia College and at one time President of the college.

Gibson began his political life as a justice of the peace, before serving as secretary of state under Presidents Anthony W. Gardner and Alfred Francis Russell from 1878 to 1884. He later served as secretary of state under Presidents Joseph James Cheeseman and William D. Coleman from 1892 to 1900. When Coleman resigned in 1900 without a vice-president, Gibson ascended to the presidency as secretary of state.

Gibson died in Monrovia on April 26, 1910. He was the last Liberian president to have been born in the United States.

== Presidency (1900–1904) ==
Prior to attaining the presidency, Gibson had had a long career in government including serving Secretary of State under four presidents.

In 1903, the British forced a concession of Liberian territory to Sierra Leone, but tension along that border remained high.

Whenever the British and French seemed intent on enlarging at Liberia's expense the neighboring territories they already controlled, periodic appearances by U.S. warships helped discourage encroachment, even though successive American administrations rejected appeals from Monrovia for more forceful support.

== See also ==
- History of Liberia

== Sources ==
- Nathaniel R. Richardson, Liberia's Past and Present. London: The Diplomatic Press and Publishing Company, 1959.

Preceded by William D. Coleman	President of Liberia; 1900–1904	Succeeded by Arthur Barclay
