= Vehicle registration plates of Egypt =

Arab Republic of Egypt
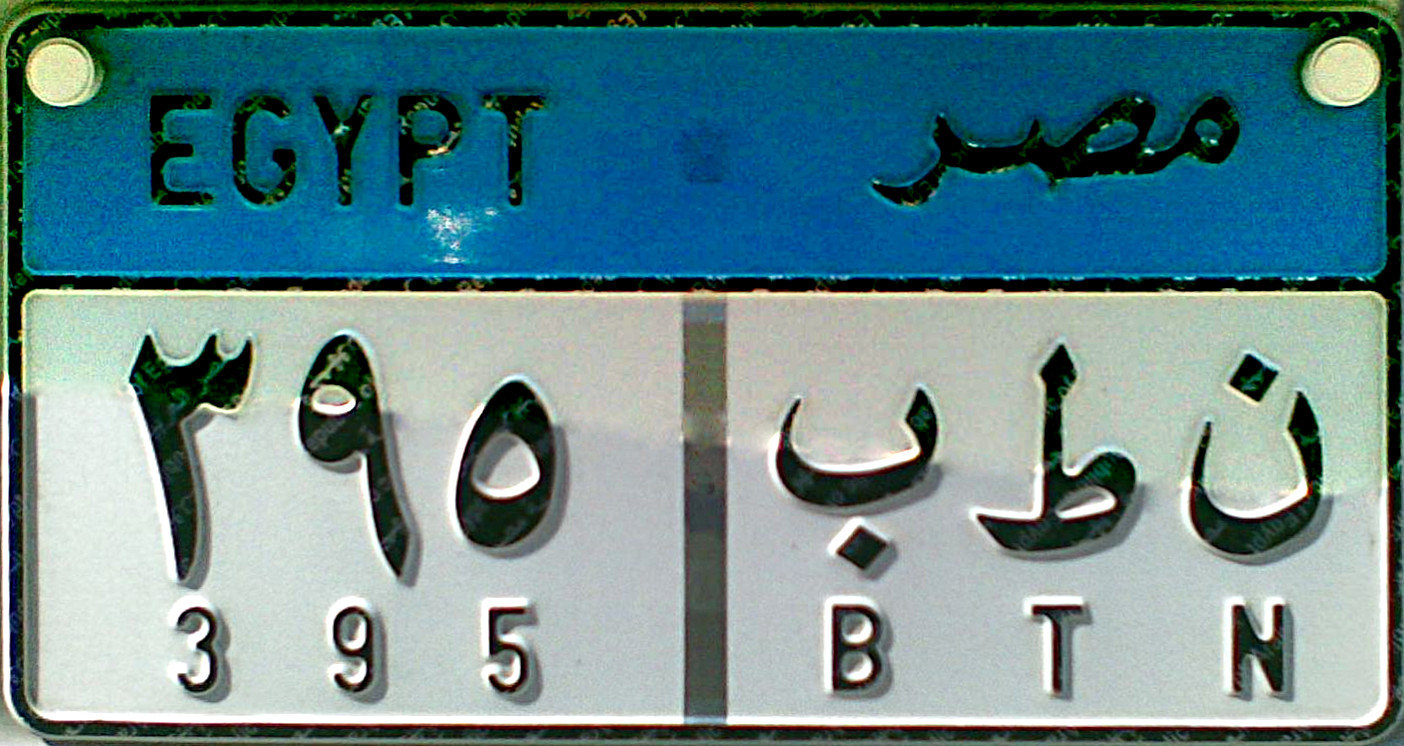
- Egyptian regular legal standard number plate.
- Country: Egypt
- Country code: EG

Current series
- Size: 35 cm × 17 cm (13.8 in × 6.7 in)
- Serial format: Not standard
- Colour (front): Black on white
- Colour (rear): Black on white

Egyptian vehicle registration number plates are used for official identification purposes for motor vehicles in Egypt. The international vehicle registration code for Egypt is EG (formerly 'ET' until April 2024).

== Appearance ==
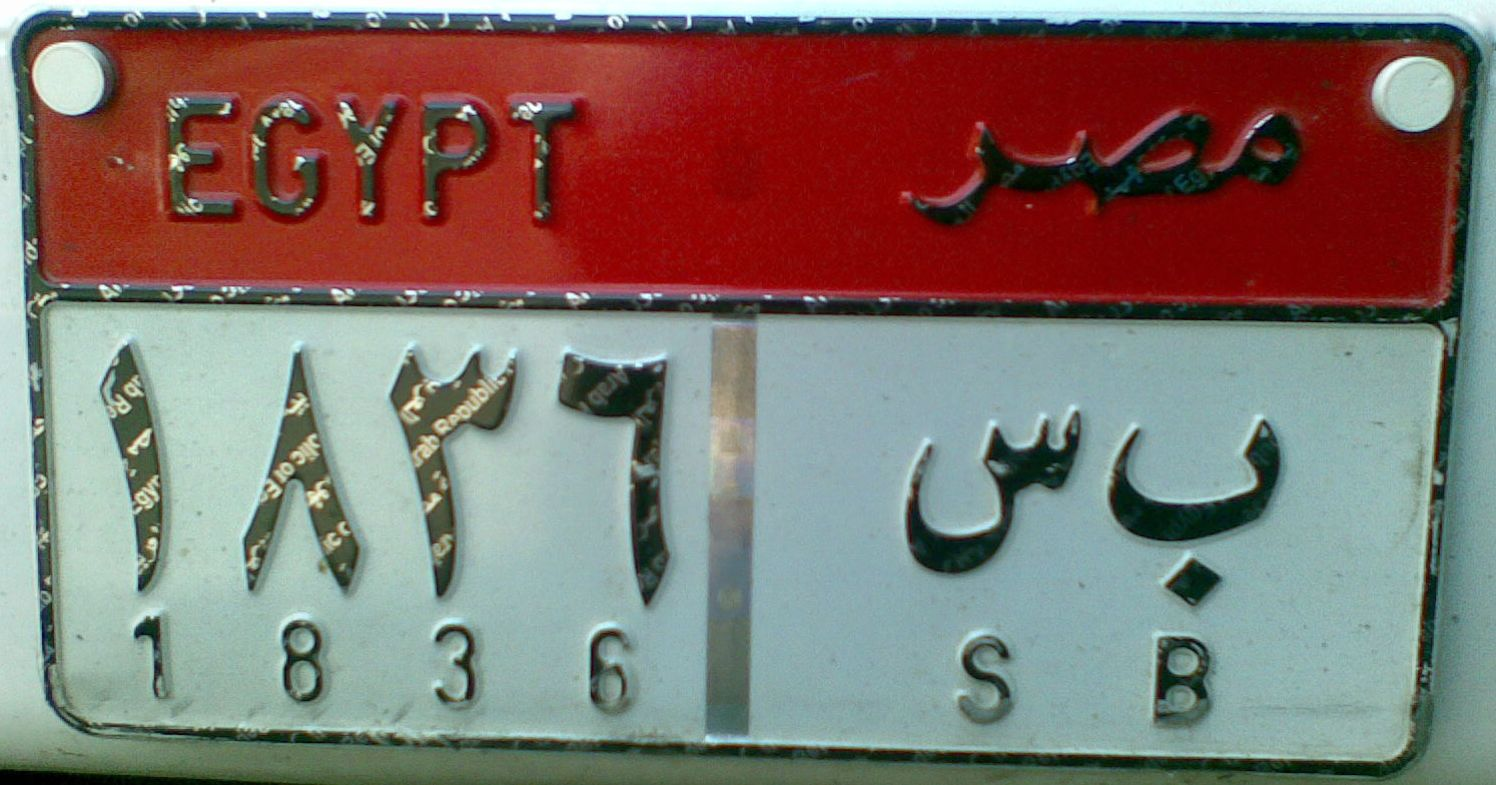
A red truck plate (Giza)

The current vehicle registration plates, which have been used since 2008, are rectangular in shape and made of aluminum. The top part has the word "Egypt" in English (all uppercase) and Arabic in black font on backgrounds of different colors depending on the type of license the vehicle is given. Motorbikes have smaller plates which are similar but much with light blue (private motorbikes) and dark blue (police motorbikes) the only colors available.

The most recent version used Calibri typeface for English text EGYPT/POLICE and Square Kufic typeface for Arabic text since 2022.

The vehicle registration number consists of two parts:

- Numeric part: three digits for Cairo license plates, four digits for all other governorates (including Giza)
- Alphabetical part: two letters for Giza license plates, three letters for all other governorates (including Cairo)

Plate code	Governorate Vehicle Registration	Image
0000-..	Giza Governorate	
000-...	Cairo Governorate	
0000-..أ	Cairo Governorate	
0000-..س	Alexandria Governorate	
0000-..ق	Qalyubia Governorate	
0000-..ر	Sharqia Governorate	
0000-..م	Monufia Governorate	
0000-..ب	Beheira Governorate	
0000-..د	Dakahlia Governorate	
0000-..ع	Gharbia Governorate	
0000-..ل	Kafr El Sheikh Governorate	
0000-..ف	Faiyum Governorate	
0000-..و	Beni Suef Governorate	
0000-..ن	Minya Governorate	
0000-..ى	Asyut Governorate	
0000-..هـ	Sohag Governorate	
0000-. ص أ	Qena Governorate	
0000-. ص ق	Luxor Governorate	
0000-. ص و	Aswan Governorate	
0000-. ط د	Damietta Governorate	
0000-. ط م	Damietta Governorate	
0000-. ج م	Damietta Governorate	
0000-. ج ى	Damietta Governorate	
0000-. ط ع	Port Said Governorate	
0000-. ط ب	Port Said Governorate	
0000-. ط ص	Ismailia Governorate	
0000-. ط ن	Ismailia Governorate	
0000-. ط س	Suez Governorate	
0000-. ط ر	Red Sea Governorate	
0000-. ط أ	North Sinai Governorate	
0000-. ط ج	South Sinai Governorate	
0000-. ج هـ	Matrouh Governorate	
0000-. ج ب	New Valley Governorate	

Numbers go from 1 to 9 and are chosen randomly. They are followed by a one to three letters.

Note : These plate codes do not apply for army, police and diplomatic vehicles.

Use of Latin letters and Western Arabic numerals below Arabic letters and Hindu–Arabic numerals was abandoned early due to the unease of reading the Arabic letters and numbers because they were too small.

To reduce the risk of confusion on account of the visual similarity between Arabic letters, only a limited number of letters are used. They and the Latin letters the Egyptian government uses to correspond to them are:

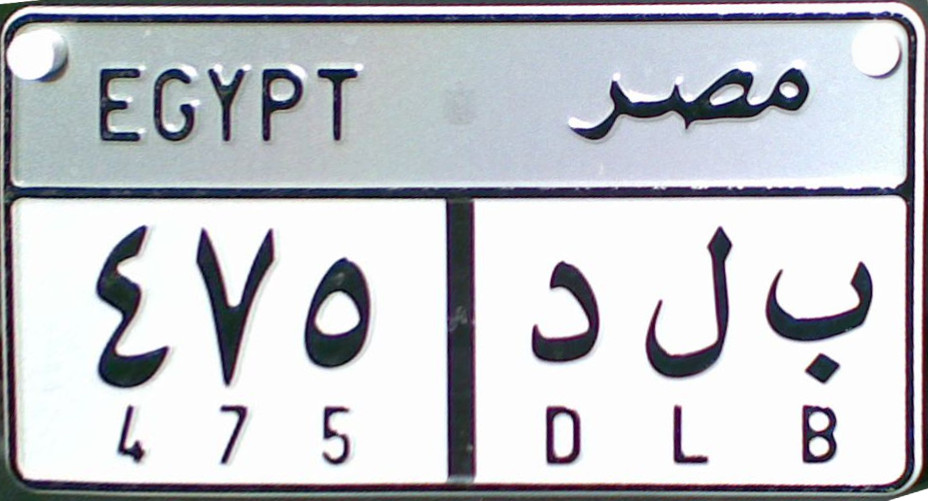
A gray bus plate

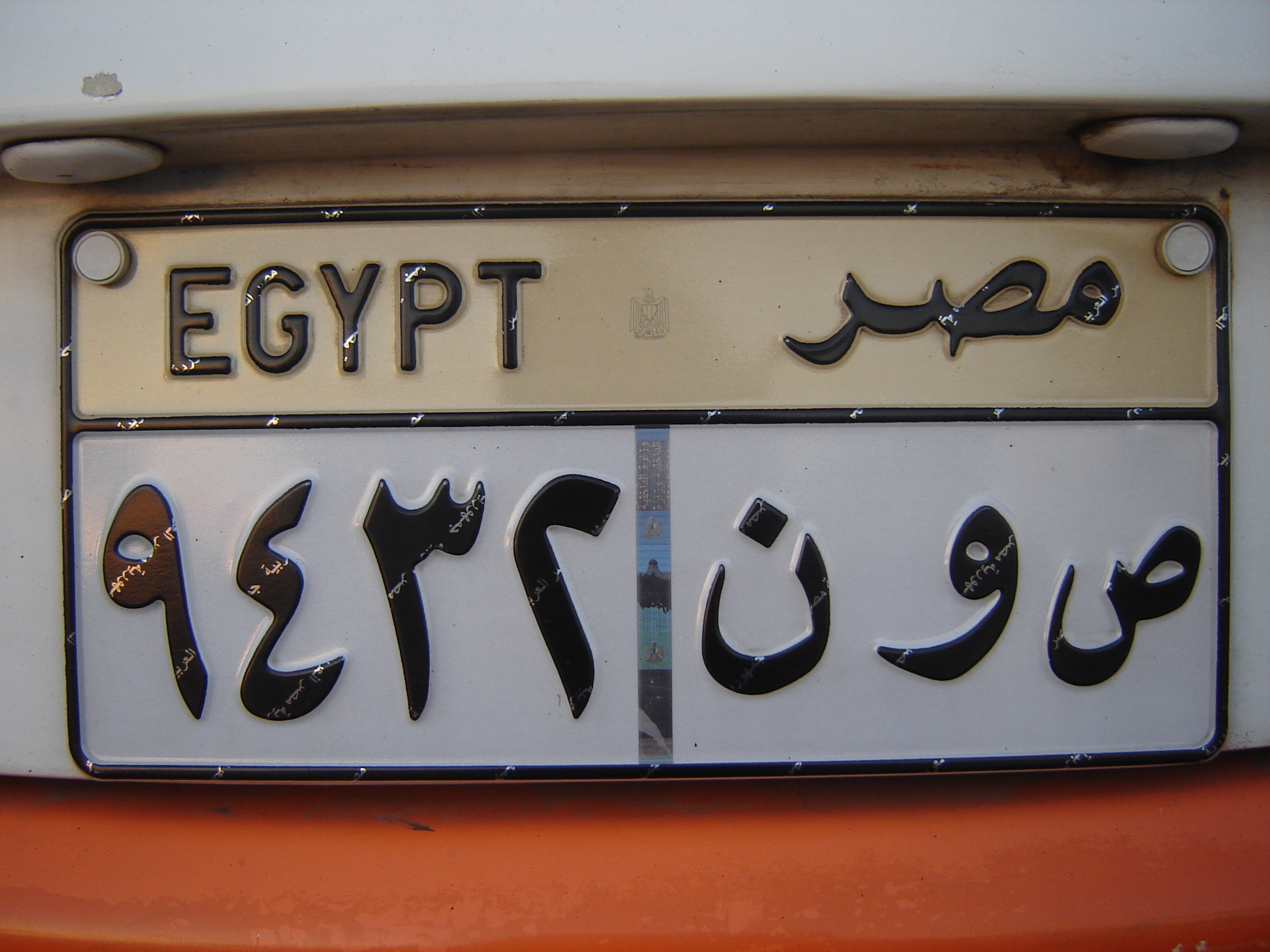
A beige tourist bus plate without Latin letters from Aswan

Arabic letter	Latin letter
أ	A
ب	B
ج	G
د	D
ر	R
س	S
ص	C
ط	T
ع	E
ف	F
ق	K
ل	L
م	M
ن	N
هـ	H
و	W
ی	Y

== Size ==
Standard license plates are of 17x35 cm.

== Design and format ==
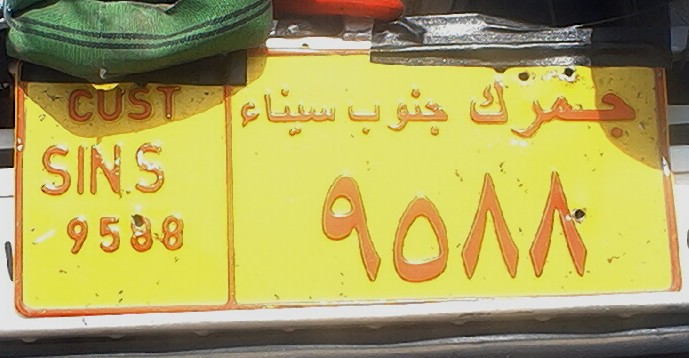
Customs plate from South Sinai (2004)

The top rectangle in the license plate is color-coded according to the type of vehicle being licensed.

- Private vehicles: Light Blue

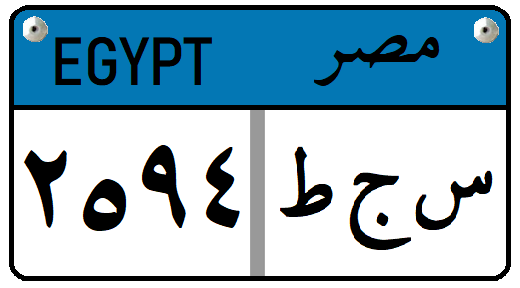

- Taxis: Orange

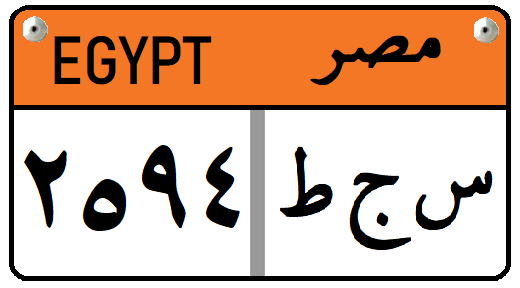

- Trucks: Red

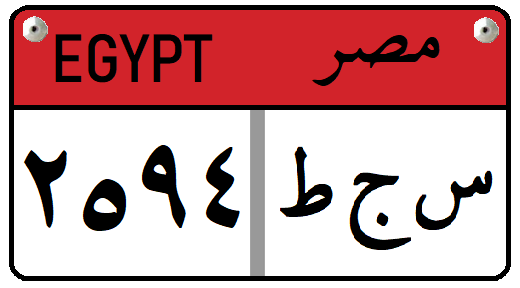

- Buses and some government vehicles: Gray

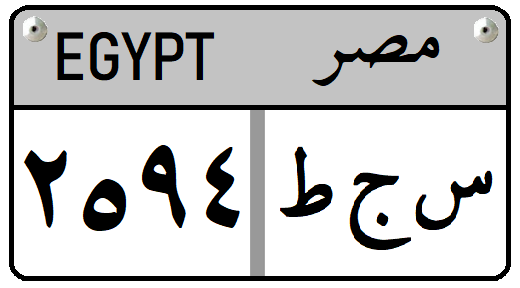

- Limousines and tourist buses: Beige

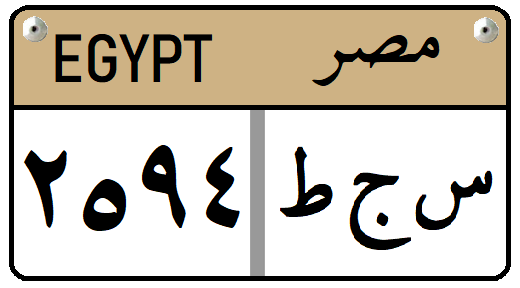

- Diplomatic Vehicles: Green, Instead of letters, there are numbers on the plate, ### - ##

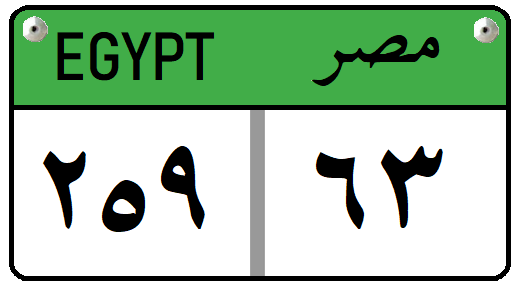

- Vehicles with unpaid customs: Yellow; foreign vehicles that cross into Egypt are required to carry this type of license plate during their stay in Egypt and pay the fees associated with it, as well as purchasing an Egyptian vehicle insurance and receiving a temporary Egyptian ownership title. In most common cases, such as tourists crossing from neighboring countries, the plate is valid for two weeks. It is additionally used for old cars belonging to the Port Said free-trade zone.

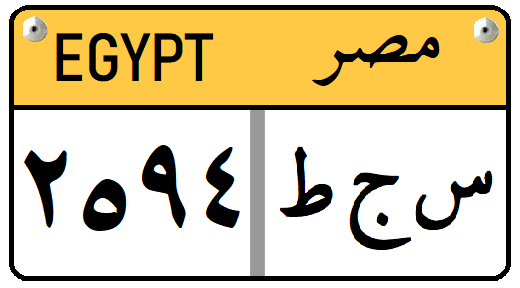

- Police vehicles: Dark blue; additionally, the Arabic and English for "Police" replace "Egypt" in the upper bar. The writing at the top is white, as opposed to black.

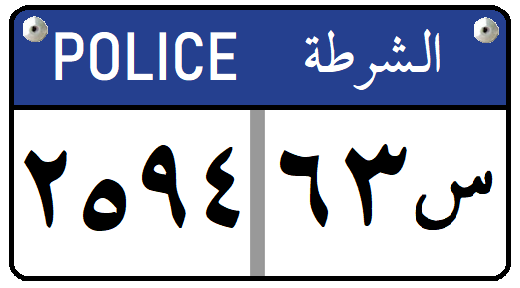

- Motorcycles: Light Blue, same as private vehicles, the registration code is shown in two lines

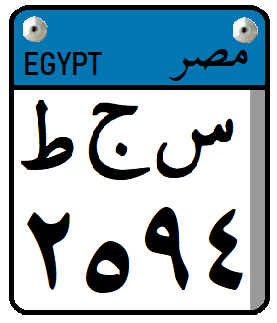

== Older versions ==
Before the introduction of the new alphanumeric plate system in August 2008, Egyptian vehicle registration numbers were purely numeric, and registered by governorate and registration type. Privately owned vehicles were generally given white plates with black lettering; other vehicles' plates were color-coded, with the entire plate being in the applicable color, as follows:

- Taxis: Orange
- Trucks: Red
- Government-owned vehicles, including police: Blue, sometimes with a white bar
- Public buses: Gray
- Vehicles with unpaid customs: Yellow

Private vehicle, Cairo, early 2000s	Private vehicle, Cairo, 1990s
Private vehicle, Cairo, 1980s	Private vehicle, Cairo, 1970s
