= Joseph Rudolph Grimes =

Liberian politician

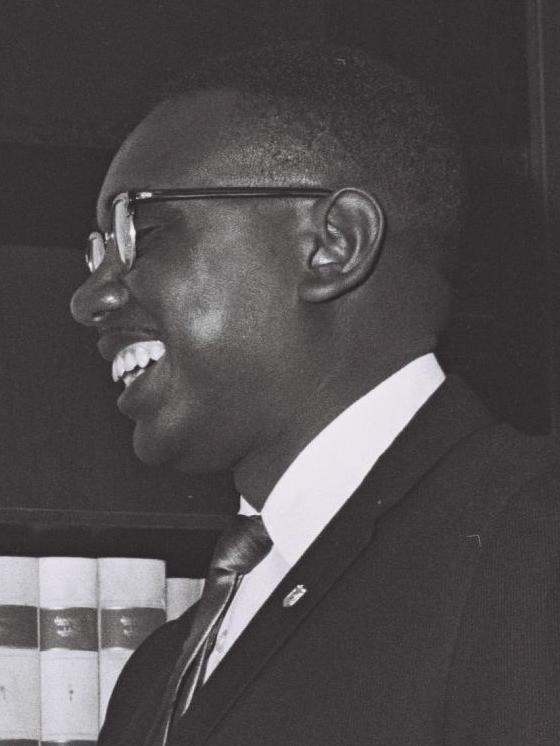
Grimes in 1963.

Joseph Rudolph Grimes (October 31, 1923 – September 7, 2007) was a Liberian statesman. A trained lawyer, he served as Secretary of State from 1960 to 1972.

== Early life ==
Grimes was born on October 31, 1923, to Louis Arthur Grimes and Victoria Grimes. He was educated at the College of West Africa (now Methodist University of Liberia) before graduating from Liberia College (now University of Liberia) with a Bachelor of Arts degree. Grimes then attended Harvard Law School in the United States where he earned a law degree, followed by a master's degree from Columbia University in New York City in international affairs.

== Career ==
Following his education in America, he returned to Liberia, where he founded the Louis Arthur Grimes School of Law at the now University of Liberia. Named after his father, the younger Grimes served as the first dean starting in 1951.

In 1958, he was appointed the acting secretary of state of Liberia. In 1960, he was appointed secretary of state by President William Tubman. Serving until 1971, he is the longest-serving foreign minister in Liberian history. He was preceded by Momolu Dukuly and was succeeded by Rocheforte Lafayette Weeks.

== Later years ==
He was elected in 1975 to membership in the Commission of the Churches on International Affairs of the World Council of Churches (CCIA/WCC) and served as its Vice-Moderator until 1983. He was engaged as its Special advisor on African Affairs and representative to the United Nations in New York in 1993–1994.

Joseph Rudolph Grimes died on September 7, 2007, at his home in Guttenberg, New Jersey, at the age of 83.

Political offices
Preceded by Momolu Dukuly	Secretary of State of Liberia; 1960–1972	Succeeded by Rocheforte Lafayette Weeks as Minister of Foreign Affairs of Liberia
