= Nuzohn Zidenmaro Kulala =

Liberian former footballer

Nuzohn Kulala
Personal information
- Full name: Nuzohn Zidenmaro Kulala
- Date of birth: May 5, 1990 (age 36)
- Place of birth: Monrovia, Liberia
- Height: 5 ft 10 in (1.78 m)
- Position: Attacking midfielder

Senior career*
Years	Team	Apps	(Gls)
2004–2005	Invaders FC		
2005–2006	Alliance FC		
2006–2008	Mighty Barrolle		
2008–2009	LISCR FC		
2009–2010	Mighty Barrolle		
2010–2011	Ghazl El Mahalla		
2012–2013	FC Fassell		
2013–2014	Sollefteå GIF		
2014–2018	Ghazl El Mahalla		

International career
2006	Liberia	5	(0)
- * Club domestic league appearances and goals as of 19:07, 28 April 2023 (UTC)

Nuzohn Zidenmaro Kulala (born May 5, 1990) is a Liberian former footballer who played as an attacking midfielder. He was a member of the Liberia national team.
