= Cletus Wotorson =

Liberian politician (1937–2024)

Member of the Senate of Liberia from Grand Kru County
- In office 13 January 2006 – 13 August 2024 Serving with Peter Sonpon Coleman
- Preceded by: NTLA
- Succeeded by: Vacant

Liberian Minister of Lands and Mines
- In office August 1978 – April 1980
- President: William R. Tolbert Jr.
- Preceded by: Aaron Holmes
- Succeeded by: Willie P. Nebo

Personal details
- Born: Cletus Segbe Wotorson; 13 March 1937 Liberia
- Died: 13 August 2024 (aged 87)
- Party: Unity Party
- Other political affiliations: Liberian Action Party; Alliance of Political Parties
- Education: Wesleyan University

Cletus Segbe Wotorson (13 March 1937 – 13 August 2024) was a Liberian politician and geologist. On 26 March 2009, he was elected as President Pro Tempore of the Senate of Liberia, beating out fellow Senator Gbehzohngar Milton Findley. He served until 2012. Wotorson died on 13 August 2024, at the age of 87.

== Positions ==
- Assistant Professor of Geology & Geophysics – University of Liberia
- Director – Liberian Geological Survey (1973–1975)
- Founder & President – West Africa Consultants (1975–1978)
- Minister of Lands & Mines – Government of Liberia (1978–1980)
- Chairman – Liberian Petroleum Refinery Company (1978–1980)
- Chairman & CEO – Liberian Petroleum Refinery Company (1980–1983)
- President – Nimba Mining Company (1988–1990)
- Standard Bearer of the Alliance of Political Parties in the 1997 presidential election. He placed fourth out of thirteen candidates, winning 2.57% of the vote
