= Martha Sandolo Belleh =

Liberian politician

Major Martha Sandolo Belleh is a former Liberian government minister. Belleh served as the Minister of Health and Social Security from 1981 to 1987 under coup leader Samuel Kanyon Doe. She graduated from Cuttington University in 1968 from the nursing division.

== Sources ==
- Guide2WomenLeaders.com
