= Hannibal Brumskine III =

Liberian-American internet entrepreneur

- Born: April 28, 1997 (age 29); Alexandria, Virginia, United States
- Occupation: Entrepreneur
- Known for: Founder, TheMusicBusiness.co

Hannibal Brumskine III (born 28 April 1997) is a Liberian-American internet entrepreneur. Brumskine III is the founder of TheMusicBusiness.co and Black Owned Consultancy. In 2021, he won the Young Diaspora Entrepreneur Of The Year award and he is considered one of the pioneers of the music industry’s online consulting space.

== Early life ==
Brumskine III was born in Alexandria, Virginia. He is the son of Liberian immigrants. He worked as a freelance consultant for small businesses in Northern Virginia and record labels nationwide.

== Career ==
Brumskine III is a Liberian-American internet entrepreneur. Brumskine III is the founder of TheMusicBusiness.co, an online consulting company for musicians and Black Owned Consultancy. In late 2020, Brumskine III launched The Music Business Live, an online messaging software which prioritized live-chat communication between independent artists and music industry professionals. He is considered one of the pioneers of the music industry online consulting space. In 2022, Brumskine III launched a similar software tailored towards black owned businesses under Black Owned Consultancy, an ed-tech platform for black professionals. Brumskine III created the platform to champion the “Great Resignation” movement amongst black professionals looking to make a financial transition.

== Awards ==
In 2021, Brumskine III won the Young Diaspora Entrepreneur Of The Year for ed-tech startup Black Owned Consultancy. The company was originally created to provide financial literacy to professionals employed in “corporate America.”
