= College of West Africa =

Methodist high school in Monrovia, Liberia

Coordinates: 6.31743°N 10.80494°W

- Monrovia; Liberia

Information
- Type: Methodist high school
- Established: 1839

The College of West Africa is a Methodist high school in Monrovia, Liberia. The school was opened in 1839 as the Monrovia Seminary, making it one of the oldest European-style schools in Africa. It has produced many of Liberia's leaders. Alumni include Liberian President Ellen Johnson Sirleaf, the first woman elected as president in an African state, and current Liberian President Joseph Boakai.

== History ==
In March 1821 Melville B. Cox, a Methodist missionary from Edenton Street United Methodist Church, was licensed to preach by the Kennebec District Conference of Maine, United States, and received his first pastoral appointment in 1822. Ill health forced Cox to return to Maine in 1825.

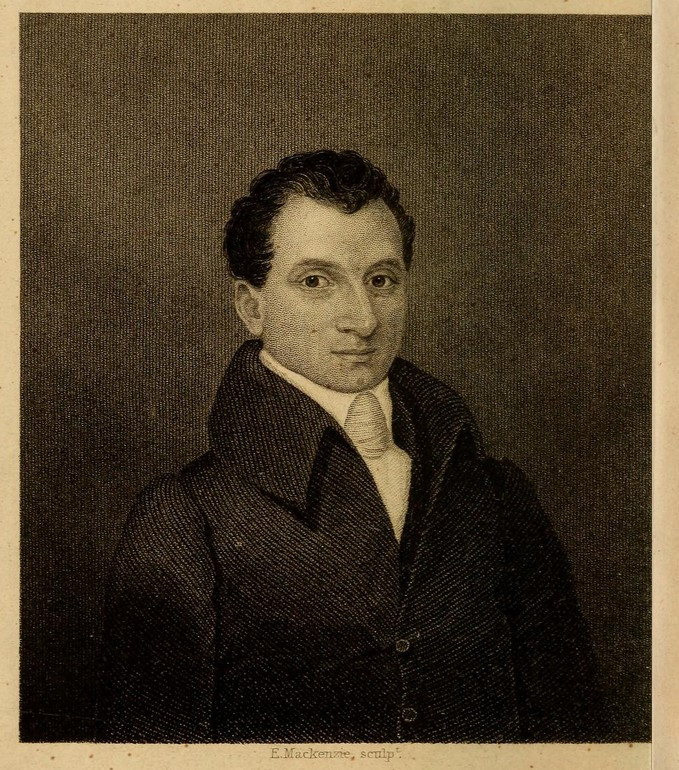
Melville B. Cox (1799-1833)

Cox moved south in November 1826 to avoid the Maine winter and hopefully recover his health. He preached on and off until 1828, when he married and settled in Baltimore, Maryland. During the next two years he was editor of The Itinerant in Baltimore. After his wife died in December 1830, Cox returned to the ministry, although his health was still fragile.

By mid-1831 Cox had become interested in missions. The Methodist Episcopal Church had formed a Missionary Society in 1819, but no suitable foreign missionary had yet been found. Cox offered himself to Bishop Elijah Hedding for the South American field. Instead, Hedding asked if he would go to Liberia, a colony established on Africa's west coast by the American Colonization Society for resettlement of free American blacks and newly freed American slaves.

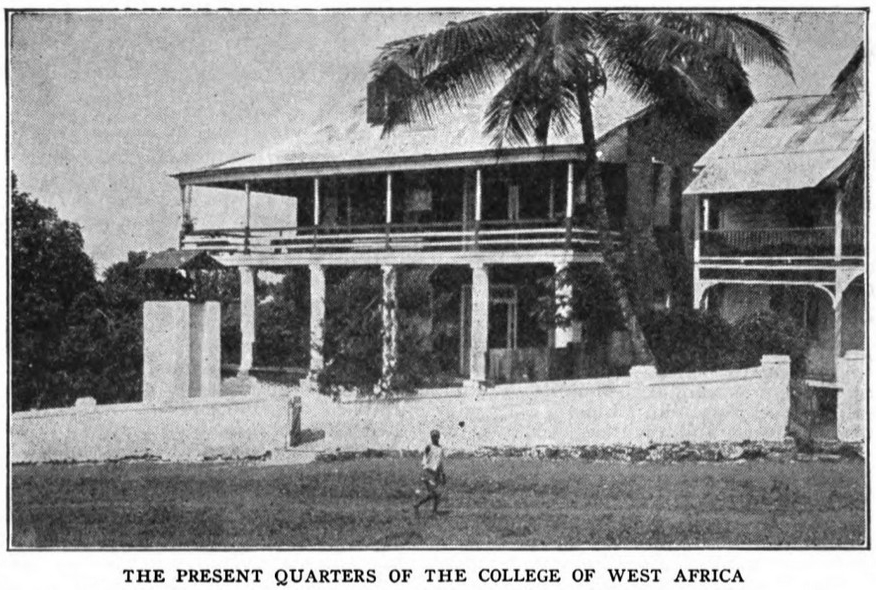
Main Building (c.1910)

Cox sailed from Norfolk, Virginia on November 6, 1832, arriving in Monrovia on March 8, 1833. He was the first Methodist missionary to Liberia. He envisioned establishing a mission house, a school, a seminary for young Christian converts, and churches. He purchased a house formerly the property of the Basel Missionary Society from Switzerland. He established the Methodist Church in Liberia as a branch of the Methodist Episcopal Church in the U.S. He held camp meetings, started regular worship and Sunday school, and developed mission strategies all within a few weeks of his arrival. He contracted malaria and died of the disease on July 21, 1833, after three months of decline. Such tropical diseases had a high mortality rate among new American settlers to the colony.

Cox's story inspired many in the early missions movement. Before he sailed for Liberia, Cox told a friend that should he die in Africa, the friend should write his epitaph. What, asked the friend, should the epitaph say? Cox replied, "Let a thousand die before Africa be given up." The College of West Africa's main building is named in memory of Melville B. Cox. A historic stained glass window in the college's auditorium reads: "Though a thousand fall, let not Africa be given up". The Cox family was active in the Methodist Society from its beginning.

== Other Methodist mission successes ==
In 1816 the General Conference of the Methodist Episcopal Church institutionalized the course of study for candidates to the ministry. A conference seminary was needed in Liberia to meet this mandate. The Monrovia Seminary was established for this purpose in 1839. (Its program was expanded to preparatory classes and it was later renamed as the College of West Africa in later years). The Rev. Jabez A. Burton was commissioned as the Seminary's first principal immediately after its establishment; he served until his death in August 1842.

The Rev. Alexander P. Camphor was appointed principal in 1896. At the end of his first year of administration, he began the re-organization of the seminary to include a high school. In 1897 Camphor presented his plans to the Liberian Annual Conference, where he gained a majority vote for the adaptation of the Monrovia Seminary to the College of West Africa. Its charter included: that it be the one central and leading school of all Methodist educational institutions; providing degree-granting courses in ministerial training while also providing a high school education; that dormitory facilities be established for male and female students.

For the next ten years Rev. Camphor worked to implement this new plan. His first project was construction of the school building that was named the Cox Memorial Auditorium (for Melville B. Cox, in recognition of his mission work). In 1904, by an act of the Liberian Legislature, the college was officially recognized and confirmed as the College of West Africa.

By 1925, as a result of personnel and financial difficulties, and political interference, the college was forced to close its collegiate department. It continued to function as a secondary school with the appointment of the Rev. R. L. Embree as its new president. Rev. Embree reorganized the curriculum and programs of the school to continue the college preparatory courses, as a high school. He continued the building project started by Rev. Camphor. As a result of his efforts, ground-breaking ceremonies were held on May 25, 1927. Construction was completed and the building ready for dedication on March 7, 1933.

The name “College of West Africa” was retained because of its charter to serve as a degree-granting institution. It later added a curriculum and classes to grant associate degrees in Business and Finance.

The school is 100% owned and operated by the Liberian Annual Conference of the United Methodist Church.

== Alumni ==
- Solomon Carter Fuller, physician
- Momolu Dukuly, statesman and diplomat
- Nathaniel Varney Massaquoi, educator and politician
- Albert Porte, journalist and political activist
- Richard Abrom Henries, politician
- Anna E. Cooper, educator
- Geraldine George, Brigadier General and National Defense Minister
- J. Rudolph Grimes, statesman
- Mary Antoinette Brown-Sherman, educator
- Izetta Roberts Cooper, librarian and writer
- T. Ernest Eastman, diplomat
- Ellen Johnson-Sirleaf, politician and first female president of Liberia or any African country
- Joseph Boakai, politician and vice-president under Ellen Johnson-Sirleaf
- Charles A. Minor, banker
- Togba-Nah Tipoteh, economist and politician
- Emmanuel Shaw, businessman
- Nathaniel Barnes, politician
- Alexander B. Cummings Jr., businessman and politician
- Patricia Jabbeh Wesley, poet and writer
- George Klay Kieh, educator and politician
- Charles McArthur Emmanuel, son of Charles Taylor
- Joseph Boayue, Secretary of Public Works
- Yatta Zoe, singer and dancer

== Faculty ==
- Ann Wilkins (1806–1857), American missionary teacher
- Samori Marksman (1947-1999), Pan-Africanist and political activist
