= John Bernard Blamo =

Liberian politician

John Bernard Blamo (born 1935) is a former politician in Liberia. He was foreign minister under Samuel Doe in 1986 and 1987. He was preceded by Ernest Eastman and replaced by J. Rudolph Johnson.
