= Vehicle registration plates of Somalia =

Somalia requires its residents to register their motor vehicles and display vehicle registration plates.

Image	First issued	Design	Slogan	Serial format	Serials issued	Notes
	A B 3017					

== Italian Africa (1913-1941) ==
The very first Italian registration plates, from 1913 to the end of the 1920s, were rectangular, with a white background and with the name or initials of the colony in red followed by the registration number, on a single line, but the documentation on this is fragmentary. For the Italian colonial troops, however, special military service plates were used with the initials SOM (Somalia) or T (Tripolitania) in front. Subsequently, until 1935, the Italian colonies used white plates on black with a colonial code on the first line, and up to 5 numbers on the second line. The numbers, in relief, were assigned serially and the plates were made of metal, with the fasces as a seal. The colonial codes were:

- ERITREA, later ER for Eritrea
- SOMALIA, later SOM for Somalia
- TRIPOLI for Tripolitania
- CNA for Cyrenaica

Between 1937 and 1941 there was an Italian governorate in Ethiopia and in those years a new type of Italian license plate was issued. They were exactly the same as the previous ones, but they had three squares on the left, colored top to bottom green, white and red, like the Italian flag, with the letters AOI (Africa Orientale Italiana) for Italian East Africa inside. The front plates resembled standard Italian front license plates, as these were smaller, and only sometimes had the colored squares like the rear license plates. The abbreviations used to indicate the origin are:

- AA for Addis Ababa
- AM for Amara
- ER for Eritrea
- GS for Galla e Sidama
- HA for Harrar
- SC for Scioà
- SOM for Somalia

== Puntland ==
A federal member state of Puntland, however, has been declared as de facto autonomous state since 1998 and does not recognize the authority of the local government of Somalia. Therefore, it issues its own license plates.

License plates have two letters and three digits, with addition of Arabic numerals in the lower right corner. At the top, it has "PUNTLAND" stamped in Latin on the left and Arabian on the right in black and Puntland's coat of arms in the center.
