= Momolu Dukuly =

Liberian politician

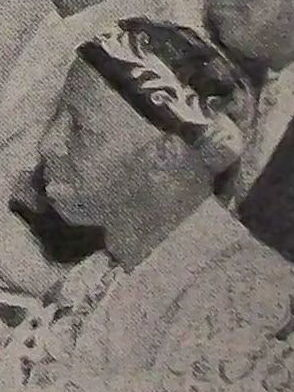
Momolu Dukuly as a delegate of Liberia in the Bandung Conference, 1955.

Momolu Dukuly (1903 – 1980) was a politician in Liberia. He was the second foreign minister under William V.S. Tubman (Dukuly replaced Gabriel Lafayette Dennis, who died in office in 1954). Dukuly was the first "Native" Liberian to be appointed foreign minister. Dukuly was of Mandingo descent. He was a Muslim in his early life. He, however, left Islam and embraced Christianity before he became foreign minister. He was preceded by Gabriel Lafayette Dennis and was succeeded by J. Rudolph Grimes.

Political offices
Preceded by Gabriel Lafayette Dennis	Secretary of State of Liberia; 1954–1960	Succeeded by Joseph Rudolph Grimes
