= Rocheforte Lafayette Weeks =

Liberian diplomat

Rocheforte Lafayette Weeks (1923–1986) was a Liberian academic, lawyer, and diplomat who served as president of the University of Liberia and as Liberia's Minister of Foreign Affairs.

== Life ==
Weeks was born on August 15, 1923, at Crozierville, the son of a Methodist minister. He was educated in Crozierville and White Plains before going to the preparatory department of Liberia College and on to study for a BA at the College, graduating in 1944. From 1944 to 1949 he was Secretary to the Vice-President of Liberia. He then studied at Howard University in Washington, D.C., gaining an LL.B in 1952, and continuing to Cornell University in 1954.

Weeks was secretary to Liberia's delegation to the Ninth Session of the United Nations General Assembly in 1954–5. He was a member of the Liberian Codification Commission in New York in 1955.

Admitted to the Bar in Montserrado in 1955, that year Weeks also began lecturing at the Louis Arthur Grimes School of Law at the University of Liberia. He was admitted to the Bar of the Supreme Court of Liberia in January 1956. He became President of the University of Liberia on April 6, 1959. As university president he participated in a range of international activities. He was special consultant to the UNESCO Conference of Higher Education in 1961–2, a deputy member of the administrative board of the International Association of Universities from 1965 to 1970, and president of the International Association of University Presidents in 1971–2.

In 1972 he gave up his university post to replace Joseph Rudolph Grimes as Secretary of State (later renamed Minister of Foreign Affairs) under President William Tolbert. He held the post until July 1973, when he was replaced by Cecil Dennis.

From 1973 to 1976, he was Managing Director of the Technico-Auriole Engineering Company. From 1976 to 1982, Weeks was the Special Maritime representative to the United States. He retired to Liberia, where he died in 1986.

Political offices
Preceded by Joseph Rudolph Grimes as Secretary of State of Liberia	Minister of Foreign Affairs of Liberia; 1972–1973	Succeeded by Cecil Dennis
