= Cecil Dennis =

Liberian politician

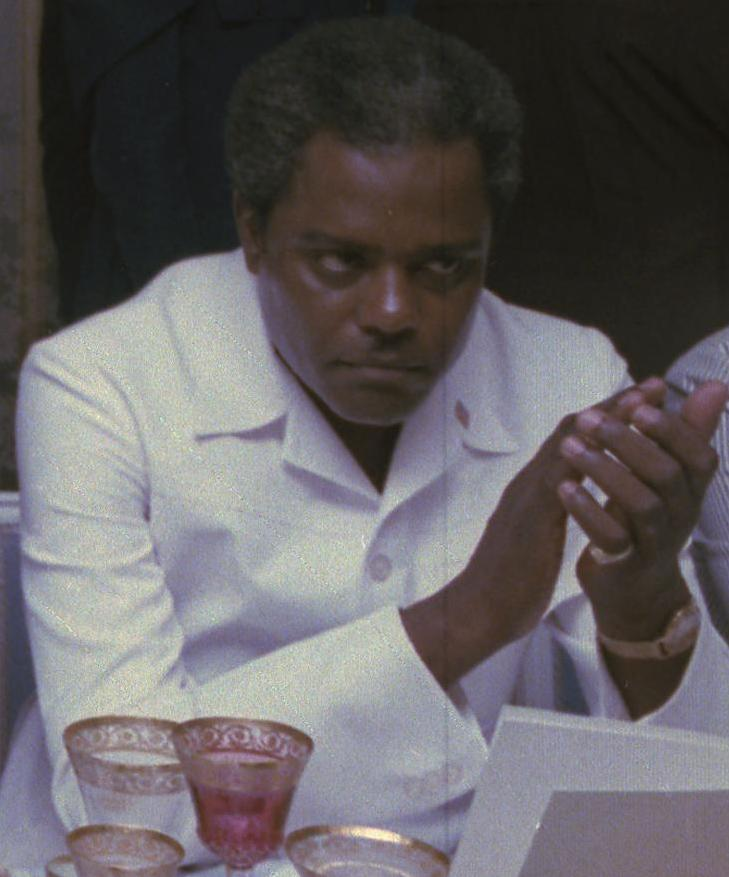

Minister of Foreign Affairs
- In office 1973 – April 12, 1980
- President: William Tolbert
- Preceded by: Rocheforte Lafayette Weeks
- Succeeded by: Gabriel Baccus Matthews

Personal details
- Born: February 21, 1931 Montserrado County, Liberia
- Died: April 22, 1980 (aged 49) Monrovia, Liberia
- Resting place: Palm Grove Cemetery
- Party: True Whig Party
- Spouse: Agnes Cooper Dennis
- Education: College of West Africa; Lincoln University; Georgetown University
- Profession: Banker

Charles Cecil Dennis Jr (February 21, 1931 – April 22, 1980) was a Liberian political figure who served as Minister of Foreign Affairs under President William Tolbert from 1973 until the 1980 Liberian coup d'état led by Samuel Doe. Along with 11 other current and former members of the Liberian government, he was tried by a military tribunal and executed by firing squad ten days after the coup.

== Biography ==
Charles Cecil Dennis, Jr, was born in Montserrado County, Liberia, on February 21, 1931. He attended the College of West Africa in Liberia, before going to the United States, where he entered Lincoln University, Pennsylvania, graduating in 1954 with a Bachelor of Arts degree in Political Science. In the fall of 1951, Dennis joined the Beta chapter of the Omega Psi Phi fraternity at Lincoln. He then completed his education at Georgetown University School of Law in Washington, DC. He was subsequently called to the bar in Liberia.

In 1960, Dennis was appointed director of the Legislative Drafting Service of the Liberian Senate. In 1965, he set up a private legal business, C. Cecil Dennis Jr. Law, in Monrovia. That same year he was made professor at the Louis Arthur Grimes School of Law, University of Liberia.

In 1973, Dennis was appointed Minister of Foreign Affairs, the post he held until his death.

Dennis was executed by soldiers on April 22, 1980, at Barclay Beach, Monrovia, alongside 12 other former leading government officials: Frank E. Tolbert (brother of President William Tolbert and President Pro-Tem of the Liberian Senate); E. Reginald Townsend, National Chairman of the True Whig Party; Cyril Bright, former Minister of Planning and Economic Affairs; Chief Justice James A. A. Pierre; Richard Abrom Henries, Speaker of the House of Representatives; Frank J. Stewart, Sr, Director of the Budget; John W. Sherman, Assistant Minister of Commerce and Trade; P. Clarence Parker II, Chairman of the National Investment Council and Treasurer of the True Whig Party; James T. Phillips, former Minister of Finance, former Minister of Agriculture; David Franklin Neal, former Minister of Planning and Economic Affairs; Joseph J. Chesson, Sr, Minister of Justice; and Charles T. O. King, Deputy Minister for Agriculture. According to journalist Larry C. Price, Dennis was the last man to be shot and defiantly stared his killers down whilst uttering a prayer before his execution at the hands of Samuel Doe's regime.

== Legacy ==
The C. Cecil Dennis Jr Auditorium, part of the Ministry of Foreign Affairs building in Monrovia, Liberia, is so-named in his honor.

On October 28, 2013, Lincoln University posthumously awarded Cecil Dennis an honorary degree, which was accepted by his widow Agnes Cooper Dennis.

Political offices
Preceded by Rocheforte Lafayette Weeks	Minister of Foreign Affairs of Liberia; 1973–1980	Succeeded by Gabriel Baccus Matthews
