= Charles Brumskine =

Liberian politician and attorney (1951–2019)

President Pro Tempore of the Senate of Liberia
- In office July 1997 – August 1999
- Preceded by: No Senate
- Succeeded by: Keikura Bayoh Kpoto

Personal details
- Born: 27 April 1951 Grand Bassa County, Liberia
- Died: 20 November 2019 (aged 68)
- Party: Liberty Party
- Children: Charlyne Brumskine
- Education: University of Liberia; Southern Methodist University
- Occupation: Attorney

Charles Walker Brumskine (27 April 1951 – 20 November 2019) was a Liberian politician and attorney. He was the leader of the Liberty Party and came third in the 2005 presidential election. He challenged incumbent Ellen Johnson-Sirleaf for the Presidency in 2011. He was also the senior partner of Brumskine & Associates, a leading Liberian law firm.

== Early life ==
Brumskine was educated at the University of Liberia where he earned a bachelor's degree in economics in 1973. He then attended Louis Arthur Grimes School of Law where he was awarded a Bachelor of Laws degree in 1981 and passed the Liberian bar. He earned a Master of Laws degree from the Dedman School of Law at Southern Methodist University in Dallas, Texas the following year.

== Political career ==
Brumskine became politically prominent in the 1990s as an ally of Charles Taylor. When Taylor became President in 1997, Brumskine became President pro tempore of the Senate. By 1999, however, they began feuding, and Brumskine fled the country after being threatened by Taylor's supporters. He returned to Liberia in 2003 with plans to run in the scheduled 2003 presidential election. However, Taylor's resignation that year and the installment of a two-year transitional government led to the elections being cancelled.

In 2004, Brumskine began campaigning for the 2005 presidential elections as a member of the Liberty Party. Like most of the other candidates, he promised to bring reconciliation to the country following its political turmoil, and improve the economy and infrastructure. What made him unique was the strong religious message in his campaign. Ultimately, he received nearly 14% of the vote, 6% less than the second-place candidate, Ellen Johnson Sirleaf, and therefore he was not able to participate in the runoff. Due to his popularity in the first round, he could have significantly influenced the run-off had he endorsed either candidate. He decided not to endorse Sirleaf or her opponent, George Weah, in the runoff.

In 2010, he announced his plans to challenge Sirleaf in the 2011 presidential election.

== 2011 elections ==
On 20 January 2011, Brumskine announced that Bong County Senator Franklin Obed Siakor would be his running mate in the 2011 presidential election. Soon after the announcement, some Liberian political analysts believed that the merger of Bassa County's Charles Brumskine and Bong County's Franklin Siakor would pose trouble for Ellen Johnson-Sirleaf's re-election bid. It was also argued that Brumskine's pairing with Siakor delivered a fatal blow to other opposition political parties that might enter the race for president, as the race was thought likely to come down to Brumskine and Johnson-Sirleaf. However, Winston Tubman was the most popular of Johnson-Sirleaf's opponents, and the third-place finisher in the contest was Prince Johnson.

== 2017 elections ==
In 2016, Brumskined announced his intention to run for President of Liberia in the 2017 elections On 19 March 2017, Brumskine announced that Harrison Karnwea, a native of Nimba County, northeastern Liberia would be his running mate in the 2017 presidential election. Brumksine the presidential candidate of the Liberty Party during the 2017 elections won 9.62%.

== Death ==
On the evening of November 20, 2019, Brumskine died. On November 21, 2019, the National Ensign was flown at half-mast from 8 am to 6 pm in Liberia. The reigning president, George Weah stated “Liberia has lost a great champion of social justice and a stalwart of our body politics. Counsellor Charles Brumskine was a legal luminary whose contributions to our justice system and political sphere will truly be missed. Words are inadequate to express how deeply saddened we all are; over the passing of Counsellor Brumskine – an astute statesman and accomplished public servant whose dedication to the country remains irrefutable.”
