= James A. A. Pierre =

Liberian judge (1908–1980)

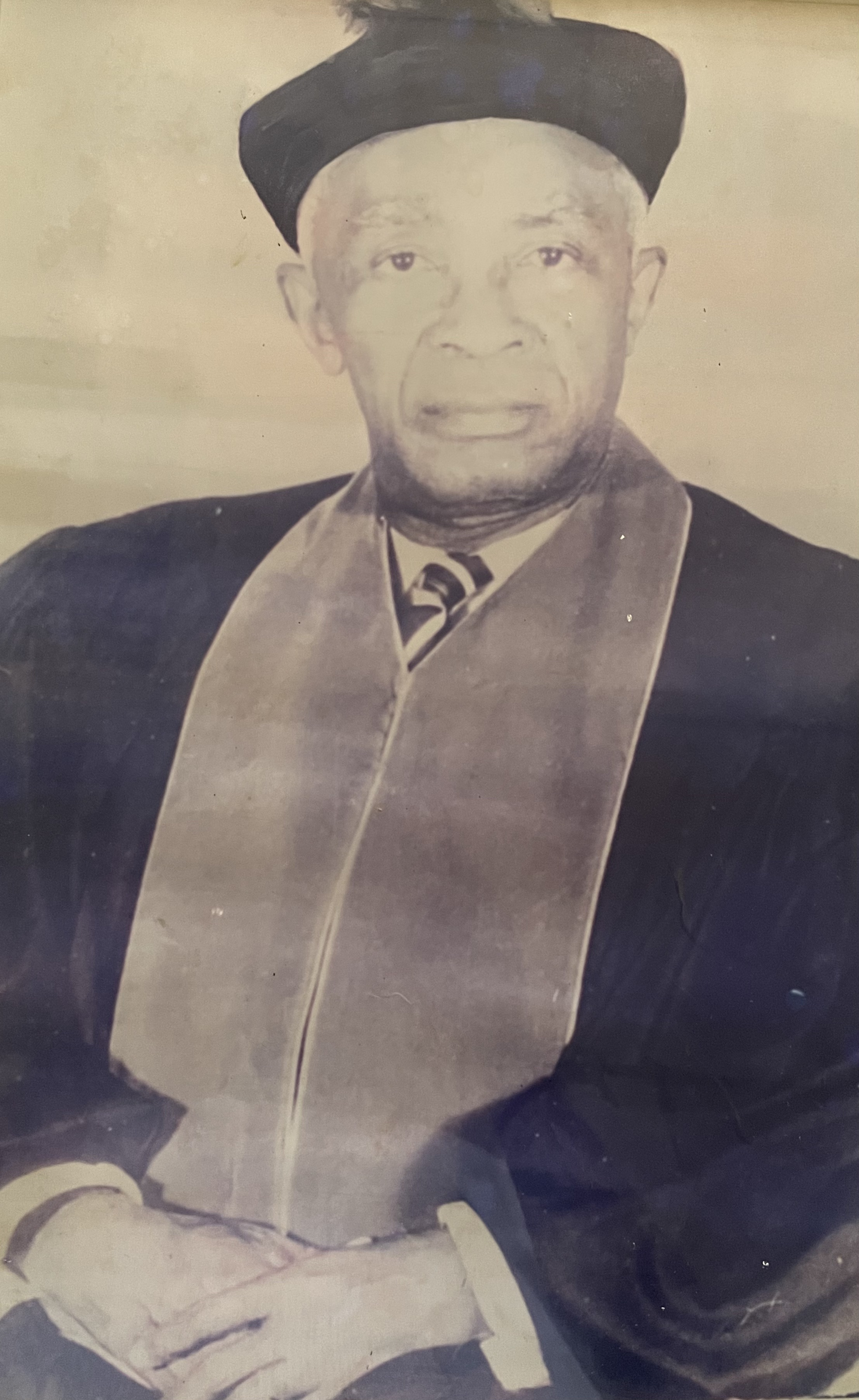

13th Chief Justice of Liberia
- In office 1971–1980
- Nominated by: William Tubman
- Preceded by: A. Dash Wilson
- Succeeded by: Emmanuel Gbalazeh

Personal details
- Born: 18 July 1908 Hartford, Liberia
- Died: 22 April 1980 (aged 71) Monrovia, Liberia
- Education: Cuttington College

James Alexander Adolphus Pierre (July 18, 1908 – April 22, 1980) was the 13th Chief Justice of Liberia, serving from 1971 until his death in 1980. He had previously served as the Attorney General of Liberia from 1964 to 1971 in the administration of William Tubman.

On the night of April 12, 1980, the 1980 Liberian coup d'état was staged by enlisted men of the army that overthrew the William Tolbert administration and led to the arrest of many senior government officials. Ten days later, on April 22, 1980, thirteen of them, including Chief Justice Pierre, were summarily executed.

== Early life ==
Pierre was born in Hartford, Grand Bassa County in Liberia on July 18, 1908, the son of Dr. Alexander A. Pierre, who emigrated to Liberia from Essequibo Islands-West Demerara, Guyana, and Serena M. Pierre. He completed his early education at nearby Bassa Industrial Academy (BIA) and thereafter attended Cuttington Divinity School, then located in Maryland County. He was a member of the class of 1929, the school's last graduating class before it moved.

His godfather, James Early, who was then employed as an auditor at the Treasury Department in Monrovia sponsored the young Pierre who was trained as an account clerk. James Pierre began employment with the Treasury Department, eventually becoming one of the Liberian government's revenue agents responsible for out station collection of taxes. This entailed him having to re-locate to Kakata.

He left government service and obtained employment with CFAO, a local French commercial house in Monrovia, as an accountant. He was later employed as the Head Tally Clerk for Raymond Concrete Pile Company, who was then constructing the Freeport of Monrovia. This position was the highest ranking one available to Liberians.

== Legal career ==
He became interested in pursuing a legal career and began his legal apprenticeship under the late Judge Summerville of Grand Bassa County and Chief Justice Louis Arthur Grimes. After undergoing the prescribed Bar Examination conducted under the Chairmanship of the Counselor B. G. Freeman, he was admitted to the Montserrado Bar as an Attorney-At-Law. Thereafter, he entered private law practice in association with the Counselor Richard A. Henries, Sr., eventually becoming managing partner of the Henries Law Firm.

In January 1952, the late Chief Justice Pierre commenced a long and distinguished legal career in Government with his initial appointment as Defense Counsel for Montserrado County. Subsequent positions held include:

1. Resident Circuit Judge of the First Judicial Circuit Court from 1952 to 1956
2. Associate Justice of the Supreme Court from January 1956 to September 1964
3. Attorney General of Liberia from 1964 to 1971

Finally on April 12, 1971, he was elevated to the position of Chief Justice of the Supreme Court of Liberia by President William V. S. Tubman. He held this position until the military coup d'état on April 12, 1980.

== Legacy and achievements ==
It is generally acknowledged that his years as Attorney General witnessed the high point of the Department of Justice because he was able to attract a high caliber of outstanding lawyers to work with him and to ably expand the duties and responsibilities of the Justice Department.

He placed particular emphasis on the establishment of a Codification Division within the Justice Department, and made the Solicitor General's office an independent section with the authority to directly liaise with the various county attorneys to ensure the orderly and efficient prosecution of government cases.

His tenure as Attorney General of Liberia was marked by his close association and identification with the Liberian Government/Cornell University Codification Project under the directorship of the late Professor Milton R. Konvitz. This program was responsible for the codification and printing of the Supreme Court's opinions as well as researching and drafting of proposed legislative statutes. Again in association with Dr. Konvitz and the Codification Project, Attorney General Pierre reactivated and had the Opinions of the Attorney General printed and published commencing with those of the late Attorney General Grimes up to and including Attorney General Pierre's tenure.

From the start, Attorney General Pierre was a strong supporter of the Codification Project because he knew how important and urgent it was to make research tools like statutory law and case law easy to find. He can truly be said to be almost single-handedly responsible for ensuring the continuous updating, printing, and publication of the Liberian Law Reports. After his death, the program was discontinued with the concomitant loss to the bench, the bar, law scholars, and students alike.

Recognizing that the legal profession had undergone vast, complex and technical changes and that there was therefore a corresponding need for an academically trained and qualified body of competent Liberian lawyers, able to interact and compete with their foreign colleagues, Chief Justice Pierre concluded that the apprenticeship system of training Liberian lawyers, under which he himself was trained was anachronistic, outmoded and had outlived its usefulness. In spite of intense opposition, one of his first acts as Chief Justice was to successfully appeal to the Legislature to abolish the apprenticeship system. Accordingly, in 1972 the Legislature amended the New Judiciary Law by adding thereto Section 17.9 which requires as a qualification for membership in the Liberian Bar that all applicants must have obtained a law degree from the Louis Arthur Grimes School of Law or from a recognized foreign law school.

With this legislation, one of the traditional privileges and prerequisites of prior Chief Justices was abolished. Prior to the enactment it was the unilateral right of the Chief Justice to instruct Circuit Court judges by mandate to admit any applicant to the Bar.

As a necessary adjunct and to ensure the continuous supply of a body of academically trained and competent young lawyers, he was a supporter of the Louis Arthur Grimes Law School of the University of Liberia. He initiated the Clerkship program under which third year honor students were selected to clerk for justices of the Supreme Court.

In an attempt to upgrade judicial appointments, Chief Justice Pierre in conjunction with the Bar, created a screening committee to submit names to the President to fill judicial vacancies. This committee was named the Brownell Committee in honor of its first chairman, and the oldest practicing counselor of the Supreme Court Bar, the Counsellor Nete Sie Brownell. The work and effectiveness of the committee were reflected in the high caliber of subsequent judicial appointments.

He made strenuous efforts to improve the Liberian Judiciary by initiating yearly judicial seminars. His attempts were not limited to the national level, and during his incumbency, he ensured that both the Bench and the Bar actively participated in both regional and international judicial conferences.

He, along with Honorable Mohammed Hidayatullah of India, Honorable Blazo Jovanovic of Yugoslavia, Honorable Warren E. Burger of the United States, Honorable Terje Wold of Norway and Honorable Samuel Azu Crabbe of Ghana, was one of only six Chief Justice worldwide selected to be judges at a mock trial of the International Court of Justice organized by the Fifth Conference on World Peace through Law at the Third World Assembly of Judges held in Belgrade, Yugoslavia. The mock trial, known as the Belgrade Spaceship, took place in July 1971.

Also in 1971, he hosted a judicial conference of West African Anglophone Chief Justices in Monrovia. One of the recommendations of the conference was the establishment of an Economic Community of West African States (ECOWAS) West African Court of Justice to adjudicate regional disputes and this has now been implemented and the ECOWAS Court established.

In January 2008, the Supreme Court of Liberia established the James A. A. Pierre Judicial Institute with the goal of enhancing the legal system in Liberia by providing proper training to all judicial officers and court staff. In June 2008 President Ellen Johnson Sirleaf launched the Institute at a ceremony held at the Temple of Justice in Monrovia. The Institute had its first graduating class from its Professional Magistrate Training Program in June 2011.

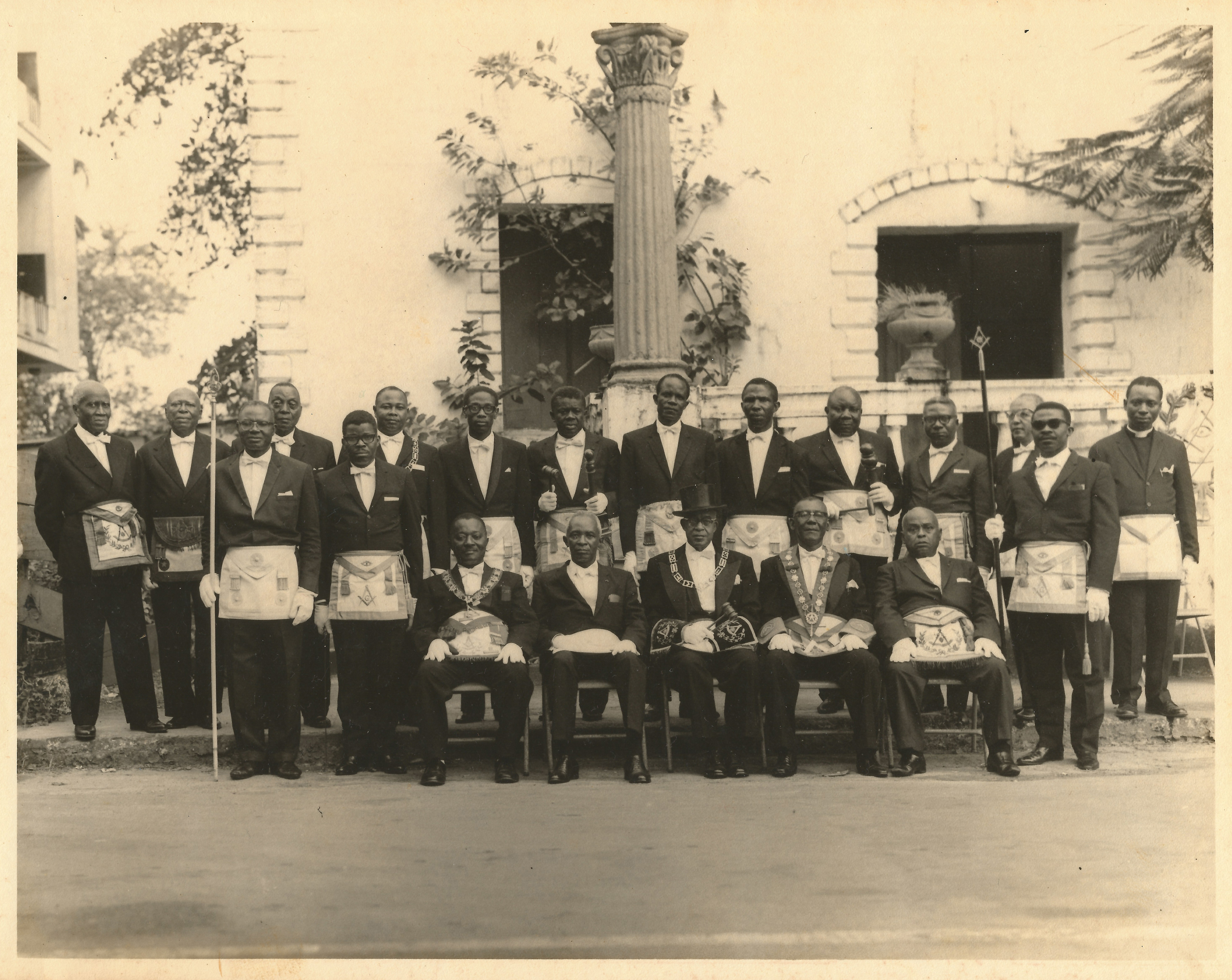
Some members of Oriental Lodge in the early mid 1960s including Chief Justice Pierre who is second from left of those sitting in the front row

== Masonic career ==
He was a freemason under the jurisdiction of the Grand Lodge of Liberia who was originally a member of Amos Lodge No. 10 which is based out of St. John River City, Grand Bassa County. Upon his relocation to Monrovia, he took a demit and joined Oriental Lodge No. 1 and later became the Worshipful Master of the Lodge. He later rose to the position of Grand Secretary of the Grand Lodge of Liberia and eventually was appointed as Honorary Deputy Grand Master of Masons.

== Personal life ==
James A. A. Pierre married three times - twice to Rebecca H. Watts and once to Onike Wilson. At the time of death in 1980, he was survived by his widow, Rebecca Watts Pierre and thirteen children - Michael S. N. Pierre, Mabel S. Benson, Carmenia E. Abdallah, Marjorie R. Cooper, James E. Pierre, Alexander A. Pierre, Inez A. Pierre, Gwendolyn H. McClain, George H. Pierre, Aldrich V. Pierre, Samuel A. Pierre, Fitzgerald J. Pierre and Theresa Y. Pierre

Legal offices
| Preceded by A. Dash Wilson | Chief Justice of Liberia; 1971–1980 | Succeeded by Emmanuel Gbalazeh |
