= Frances Johnson-Morris =

Liberian lawyer and politician

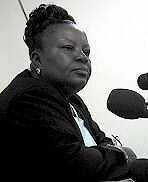
- Johnson-Morris in 2010

Chief Justice of the Supreme Court of Liberia
- In office 1996–1997
- Preceded by: James G. Bull
- Succeeded by: Gloria Musu-Scott

Frances Johnson-Morris is a Liberian lawyer who was the chairperson of Liberian National Election Commission (NEC) in 2005 supervising the election that produced the first democratically elected female President of Liberia and Africa Ellen Johnson Sirleaf. She was also the chairwoman of the Liberian Anti-Corruption Commission.

== Education and career ==
Johnson-Morris earned a degree in law from the Louis Arthur Grimmes School of Law, Monrovia, and a bachelor's degree in English from the University of Liberia. Her judicial career began with her appointment as a resident circuit judge from 1989 until 1997 when she became the Chief Justice of the Supreme Court of Liberia. She was the national director of the Catholic Justice and Peace Commission in Liberia from 2004 to 2005. In 2006, Johnson-Morris was appointed as Minister of Justice and held the office of Attorney General of Liberia. She was moved to the Ministry of Commerce and Industry in 2007.
