= Francis Korkpor =

Liberian lawyer and jurist

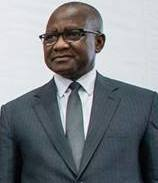

19th Chief Justice of Liberia
- In office March 3, 2006 – September 24, 2012
- Nominated by: Ellen Johnson Sirleaf
- Preceded by: Johnnie Lewis
- Succeeded by: Sie-A-Nyene Yuoh

Personal details
- Born: September 7, 1952
- Education: University of Liberia; Louis Arthur Grimes School of Law

Francis S. Korkpor (born September 7, 1952) is a Liberian jurist and lawyer who served as Chief Justice of the Supreme Court of Liberia from 2013 to 2022. Prior to his tenure as Chief Justice he was an associate justice on the Supreme Court. He was the most senior member of the court at the time of his mandatory retirement at age 70.

== Early life and education ==
Francis Korkpor was born on September 7, 1952. He graduated from the University of Liberia with a bachelor of arts degree in sociology and from the Louis Arthur Grimes School of Law. He later taught at the Louis Arthur Grimes School of Law. He was a trial lawyer a director of the Justice and Peace Program by the Catholic Church.

== Career ==
Korkpor was appointed as an associate justice of the Supreme Court of Liberia in 2004. Jerome Verdier, former chair of the Truth and Reconciliation Commission, stated that Korkpor was one of "the most progressive justices on the bench".

President Ellen Johnson Sirleaf appointed Korkpor as interim Chief Justice of the Supreme Court to replace Johnnie Lewis, who retired due to ill health, in 2012. At the time of Korkpor appointment he was the most senior member of the current composition of the Supreme Court. His appointment was criticised due to his lack of a Master of Laws degree.

As chief justice Korkpor administered the oath of office to President George Weah. The Constitution of Liberia requires that justices retire at the age of 70 and Korkpor left the court on September 27, 2022. He denied that he was seeking to be the vice presidential running mate of Weah for the 2023 election.

== Works cited ==
=== News ===
- "Associate Justice Francis Korkpor Tipped as Chief Justice Ad Interim of Liberia". FrontPage Africa. September 12, 2022. Archived from the original on December 8, 2015.
- Butty, James (September 14, 2012). "Appointment of Liberia's Acting Chief Justice Questioned". Voice of America. Archived from the original on June 21, 2025.
- Butty, James (September 7, 2012). "Citing Poor Health, Liberia's Chief Justice Steps Down". Voice of America. Archived from the original on June 21, 2025.
- Dodoo, Rodney (March 9, 2021). "Liberia: Chief Justice Korkpor Denies Being Tipped as Running Mate to Pres. Weah in 2023". FrontPage Africa. Archived from the original on June 21, 2025.
- Toweh, Alphonso (September 28, 2022). "Walking Through A Legacy Of History". New Republic Liberia. Archived from the original on June 21, 2025.
- Sieh, Lennart (March 14, 2022). "Liberia: Chief Justice Post Soon to be Vacant as Justice Korkpor Reaches Retirement Age in September". FrontPage Africa. Archived from the original on June 21, 2025.

=== Web ===
- "His Honor Francis Korkpor". Liberia School of Law. Archived from the original on June 21, 2025.
- "Presidential Inauguration in Liberia". United Nations. Archived from the original on June 21, 2025.

Legal offices
Preceded by Johnnie Lewis	Chief Justice of Liberia; 2013–2022	Succeeded by Sie-A-Nyene Yuoh
