= Henry Reed Cooper =

Liberian judge (1940–2023)

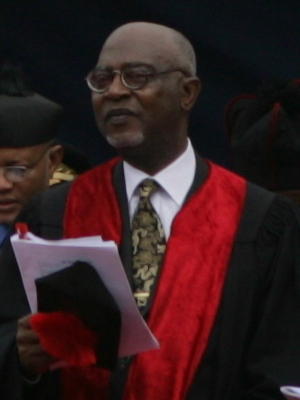
- Cooper in 2006

Chief Justice of the Supreme Court of Liberia
- In office 2003–2006
- Preceded by: Gloria Musu-Scott
- Succeeded by: Johnnie Lewis

Personal details
- Born: 3 September 1940 Monrovia, Liberia
- Died: 24 August 2023 (aged 82) Monrovia, Liberia
- Education: Louis Arthur Grimes School of Law; University of Pennsylvania Law School

Henry Reed Cooper (3 September 1940 – 24 August 2023) was a Liberian judge. He served as Chief Justice of Liberia from 2003 to 2006, during the Gyude Bryant transitional government, following the Second Liberian Civil War.

== Early life and career ==
Henry Reed Cooper was born on 3 September 1940 in Monrovia. He was a Congo person. His father was Jesse Reed Cooper, director of the Liberia Telecommunications Corporation. He attended St. Patrick's Elementary School, and received a high school education from the College of West Africa, graduating in 1960. He graduated first from the University of Liberia and then earned a Bachelor of Laws degree from Louis Arthur Grimes School of Law. He later earned a master's in law from the University of Pennsylvania Law School.

== Career ==
Early in his career, Cooper worked at the Department of State under J. Rudolph Grimes. As a lawyer, he became a partner at the law office Bright, Cooper & Simpson Law Office, later known as Cooper & Togbah Law Office. He was a member of the Liberia Bar Association.

Cooper served as Chief Justice of Liberia from 2003 to 2006, during the Gyude Bryant transitional government. After retiring as Chief Justice, he continued to work for Cooper & Togbah Law Office.

In 2013, President Ellen Johnson Sirleaf appointed Cooper as Acting Mayor of Monrovia after Mayor Mary Broh resigned.

== Personal life and death ==
His wife was Annie Nadu Cooper. Together, they had four children.

Cooper died at the John F. Kennedy Medical Center in Monrovia, on 24 August 2023, at the age of 82.

Legal offices
Preceded by Gloria Musu-Scott	Chief Justice of Liberia; 2003–2006	Succeeded by Johnnie Lewis
