= Sie-A-Nyene Yuoh =

Liberian jurist

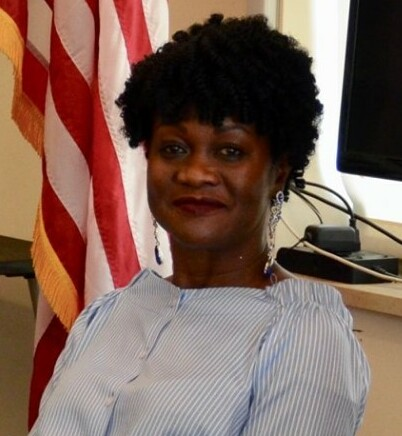
- Yuoh in 2019

Chief Justice of the Supreme Court of Liberia
- Incumbent
- Assumed office September 27, 2022
- Preceded by: Francis Korkpor

Associate Justice of the Supreme Court of Liberia
- In office 2013 – September 27, 2022

Personal details
- Born: Montserrado County, Liberia
- Education: Cuttington University; Louis Arthur Grimes School of Law

Sie-A-Nyene Gyapay Yuoh is a Liberian jurist and politician who currently serves as chief justice of the Supreme Court of Liberia and was nominated on August 23, 2022. She began to serve after the retirement of former chief justice Francis Korkpor on September 27, 2022.

== Early life and education ==
Yuoh was born in Montserrado County and educated at a Catholic high school in Monrovia. She has a Bachelor of Arts from Cuttington University (1978) and a Bachelor of Laws from the Louis Arthur Grimes School of Law, University of Liberia.

== Career ==
Yuoh worked in the Liberian government, as an assistant minister for legal affairs from 1983–1985 and as the coordinator of African affairs at the Ministry of Foreign Affairs from 1988–1990. From 2000–2003 she worked for the Central Bank of Liberia, where she came under criticism for receiving "excessive Board of Director fees', before serving as acting executive director and then commissioner of the Law Reform Commission from 2011 until 2013.

In 2013, Yuoh was appointed as an associate justice of the Supreme Court of Liberia, one of two women among the court's five justices.

In April 2016, a Roberts International Airport security officer was imprisoned for a week on contempt charges after Yuoh complained that he had disrespected her.

In October 2016, Yuoh lifted a stay order on the holding of the election for speaker of the House of Representatives, declining Alex J. Tyler's plea that he was removed unconstitutionally leading to the election of her husband's friend Emmanuel Nuquay.

In March 2017, Yuoh was one of the three justices to vote in favor of the controversial new National Code of Conduct which prohibits officials appointed by the president from engaging in political activities.

On August 23, 2022, President George Weah nominated Yuoh to replace Francis Korkpor as chief justice, as he planned to retire in September. Korkpor retired on September 27.

== Personal life ==
Yuoh was married to politician Edwin Snowe, who was previously married to the daughter of Charles Taylor. She has ten children and two grandchildren.

Legal offices
Preceded by Francis Korkpor	Chief Justice of Liberia; 2022–present	Incumbent
