= Dessaline Harris =

Liberian jurist (1895–1966)

Dessaline Harris (1 October 1895 – 29 March 1966) was a Liberian jurist and a member of the Supreme Court of Liberia.

== Early life and career ==
Born 1 October 1895, Buchanan, Grand Bassa County, he studied at Cuttington College and began his public career as a Justice of the Peace in 1916. From 1940 to 1947, he was the Grand Bassa County attorney; he left this position to become the judge of the county's circuit court, which office he held until 6 January 1954. On the latter date, he was appointed to the Supreme Court by President William Tubman, and he remained on the court until his death on 29 March 1966, aged 70.

== Personal life ==
Harris was married three times and fathered twelve children (four sons and eight daughters); he was a member of multiple fraternal organizations and of the Episcopal Church. After his death, he was honored with funeral services at the Capitol Building and the Temple of Justice before his burial in his native Buchanan.
