= Alfred Brownell =

Liberian environmental lawyer and activist

- Born: 1965 or 1966; Grand Cape Mount County, Liberia
- Education: University of Liberia, Tulane University Law School
- Occupation: Lawyer
- Employer: Yale University
- Awards: Goldman Environmental Prize

Alfred Lahai Gbabai Brownell (born 1965 or 1966) is a Liberian environmental activist and lawyer. He is currently the Founding President of Global Climate Legal Defense, a legal organization that uses the law to keep climate defenders free to speak and to act.

Brownell met international attention because of his advocacy to prevent the destruction of tropical forests in Liberia for palm oil production. After receiving death threats as a result of his work, he and his family fled Liberia in 2016. He won the Goldman Environmental Prize, also called the "Green Nobel," in 2019 for his work protecting more than 500,000 acres (2,000 km^{2}) of the tropical forest that were traditional lands of local communities.

== Early life and education ==
Brownell was born in Grand Cape Mount County, Liberia, and faced economic difficulties in his childhood. He graduated from the University of Liberia in 1994, receiving his Bachelor's of Science degree in General Agriculture. He then attended the University of Liberia's Louis Arthur Grimes School of Law, graduating in 1999. He subsequently attended the Tulane University Law School, where he earned a Master of Laws degree in 2002.

== Career ==
After finishing law school, Brownell co-authored legislation to protect forest land and the rights of the indigenous communities living on the land. However, he found that the government infringed on the newly implemented laws without performing impact studies or consulting with local communities. "The government proceeded to give away the same forest areas that we had struggled to protect. They started to award this forestland to mining companies, to agricultural companies, and to logging companies. They weren’t consulting the communities, they weren’t doing environmental impact studies, it was an official sitting up in his office, saying to these companies, ‘Here’s five million acres of land, go take that'", Brownell said in an interview. Brownell noted that the clear-cutting of forest for palm oil plantations left local communities worse off, because not enough jobs were created to employ residents who lost their land as a result of the development. As part of his work protecting threatened lands and advocating for local communities, Brownell founded Liberia's first environmental law non-governmental organization, Green Advocates International.

Around 2009, the government awarded large land leases to several multinational corporations which intended to clear-cut the forest and plant palm oil plantations. For instance, in 2010, the Liberian government leased over 500,000 acres (200,000 ha) of land in Sinoe County to Golden Veroleum Liberia, a Singapore-based palm oil producing company. The company planned to turn the forest land into palm oil plantations, but local residents began to protest the clearing of their land without their consent. Brownell and his team documented the intimidation and harassment of community members, the destruction of forest land and homes, and the desecration of graves and sacred sites. He worked to file complaints with a global certification organization, the Roundtable on Sustainable Palm Oil, which called for a halt on development of the land. Brownell's family members were arrested and he was attacked, forcing him to flee the country in 2016.

After leaving Liberia, he was a "Distinguished Scholar in Residence at Northeastern University School of Law Program on Human Rights and the Global Economy" from 2017 to 2021. He has also served as the Robert F. Drinan, J.J., Chair in Human Rights at Georgetown University Law Center and the Tom and Andi Bernstein Human Rights Fellow and Visiting Research Scholar at Yale Law School.

He has co-founded a number of environmental and human rights organizations in West Africa and internationally. In 2022, he co-founded Global Climate Legal Defense and serves as the legal non-profit's founding president.

== Awards ==
The 2019 Goldman Environmental Prize was bestowed to Alfred Lahai Gbabai Brownell, for his work as a environmental activist and advocate who fought to save 500,000 acres of tropical forest on the customary lands of local people in Liberia from being cleared for palm oil extraction.

In 2026, Brownell won the Elisabeth Haub Award for Environmental Law and Diplomacy for his groundbreaking contributions to the progressive development of environmental law.
