= Milton R. Konvitz =

American Constitutional scholar (1908–2003)

- Born: March 12, 1908; Safed, Historic Palestine, Ottoman Empire
- Died: September 5, 2003 (aged 95); Long Branch, New Jersey, U.S.
- Occupations: Professor and author
- Notable work: Bill of Rights Reader
- Spouse: Mary Traub (m. 1942)
- Children: 1; Josef

Milton Ridbas Konvitz (March 12, 1908 – September 5, 2003) was a Constitutional scholar and author of over 20 books. For nearly 35 years, he was a professor in Cornell's Law School and its School of Industrial and Labor Relations (ILR). He led a group of lawyers to codify the Liberian Constitution. He had a lifelong interest in Jewish studies and, in one of his last books, he examined the U.S. Constitution through the lens of the Torah.

== Early life and education ==
Konvitz was born in 1908 in Safed—a city that is now in Israel but was then part of the vilayet of Sidon, in the Historic Palestine region of the Ottoman Empire. Konvitz was the son of Rabbi Joseph Konvitz and Welia Wilovsky Konvitz, and was grandson of Rabbi Yaakov Dovid Wilovsky (Ridvaz).

In 1915, his family immigrated to the United States (he became a naturalized citizen in 1926). He graduated from high school in Trenton, New Jersey at age 16. He then studied at New York University (NYU), where he received a bachelor's degree in 1929, and a law degree in 1930. He earned a Ph.D. in philosophy from Cornell in 1933.

== Academic career ==
Initially unable to find an academic job, Konvitz practiced law. He served as legal counsel for the Newark and New Jersey housing authorities. In the early 1940s, he worked for the NAACP Legal Defense Fund. He was principal assistant to Thurgood Marshall on cases involving racial segregation, police brutality, and lynchings.

After a brief stint teaching at NYU and the New School for Social Research, Konvitz accepted a professorship in Cornell's School of Industrial and Labor Relations (ILR) in 1946. For many years afterward, he taught two ILR courses on the formation of American ideals in which "he used the Bible, Plato and other texts to illuminate the intellectual underpinnings of the Constitution." The courses were taught to a total of 8,000 students. Future Supreme Court Justice Ruth Bader Ginsburg was one of those students. She later admitted to being too shy to approach Professor Konvitz, but after she graduated they initiated a correspondence, and she considered him a mentor.

Konvitz's most successful book was Bill of Rights Reader: Leading Constitutional Cases. First published in 1954, he revised and expanded it four times in the next two decades. The book contains over 100 cases pertaining to civil rights—most but not all of them decided before the U.S. Supreme Court. For each case, he includes introductory notes as well as key passages from the justices' concurring and dissenting opinions. Although "Bill of Rights" is in the title, Konvitz does not limit his selections to cases related to the first ten amendments but instead ranges over "all provisions incorporating civil and political liberties wherever they may appear in the Constitution." He states in the preface that his objective was to make "a contribution to the education of that mythical character, the average educated American who is interested in the great issues and the great debates of his day."

Following retirement from teaching in 1973, Konvitz continued his scholarly pursuits. He ended up writing or editing over two dozen books. His first, The Alien and the Asiatic in American Law (1946), was cited in three Supreme Court cases in the 1970s. His 1953 book, Civil Rights in Immigration, was praised for offering a then-rare perspective that emphasized "civil rights with respect to immigration and naturalization". He also wrote two critical studies of Ralph Waldo Emerson.

In addition to his work on Constitutional law, Konvitz was a scholar of Judaism. He helped start Cornell's Program of Jewish Studies, and advocated for the creation of a Department of Near Eastern Studies. Among his books were Judaism and Human Rights (1972), Judaism and the American Idea (1978), and Torah and Constitution: Essays in American Jewish Thought (1998). He served on the editorial board of Encyclopedia Judaica and co-founded the journal Judaism and the Zionist magazine Midstream.

In 1998, Cornell established the Milton R. Konvitz Professorship of Jewish and Near Eastern Studies. It was endowed through contributions from 190 former students, colleagues and friends of Konvitz. Ross Brann was the first to hold that professorship.

== Liberian Codification Project ==
Working with Chief Justice James A. A. Pierre of the Supreme Court of Liberia, Konvitz drafted the body of statutory laws for the Republic of Liberia. He also edited the opinions of Liberia's Supreme Court. As a token of thanks for his work he received the Grand Band of the Order of the Star of Africa, as well as an honorary degree from the University of Liberia.

== Personal life ==
Konvitz was married for over 50 years to the former Mary Traub. Their son Josef was a senior official of the Organisation for Economic Co-operation and Development (OECD) until 2011, and later a visiting professor at King's College, London.

Konvitz had three brothers, Philip, Sol, and Ben. Philip was an innovator in the modern bail bond business, a real estate developer, and active in Jersey Shore politics. He earned notoriety late in life when he was indicted as part of the Operation Bid Rig investigation.

Milton Konvitz died on September 5, 2003, at Monmouth Medical Center in Long Branch, New Jersey. He was 95.

== Published works ==
- The Alien and the Asiatic in American Law. Cornell University Press. 1946. LCCN 47030101. OCLC 769592.
- On the Nature of Value: The Philosophy of Samuel Alexander. King's Crown Press. 1946. LCCN a47001116. OCLC 220496695.
- The Constitution and Civil Rights. Columbia University Press. 1947. LCCN a46000963. OCLC 922026.
- Essays in Political Theory. Cornell University Press. 1948. LCCN 48008639. OCLC 1904356. Co-edited with Arthur E. Murphy.
- Education for Freedom and Responsibility. Cornell University Press. 1952. LCCN 52014763. OCLC 966544. Co-edited with Edmund Ezra Day.
- Civil Rights in Immigration. Cornell University Press. 1953. LCCN 53012660. OCLC 504276.
- Bill of Rights Reader: Leading Constitutional Cases. Cornell University Press. 1954. LCCN 54012758. OCLC 754099. Four revised and expanded editions were later issued.
- Liberian Codification Project. Cornell University Press. 1955. LCCN 2015372046.
- Fundamental Liberties of a Free People: Religion, Speech, Press, Assembly. Cornell University Press. 1957. LCCN 57013950.
- Liberian Code of Laws of 1956. Cornell University Press. 1957. LCCN 58019091.
- Aspects of Liberty: Essays Presented to Robert E. Cushman. 1958. LCCN 58004267. OCLC 982747. Co-edited with Clinton Rossiter.
- The American Pragmatists: Selected Writings. Meridian Books. 1960. LCCN 60012329. Co-edited with Gail Kennedy.
- A Century of Civil Rights. Columbia University Press. 1961. LCCN 61008988.
- Emerson: A Collection of Critical Essays. Prentice-Hall. 1962. LCCN 62014850. Co-edited with Stephen E. Whicher.
- First Amendment Freedoms: Selected Cases on Freedom of Religion, Speech, Press, Assembly. Cornell University Press. 1963. LCCN 63018091.
- The Founding of the New York State School of Industrial and Labor Relations: A Tribute to Irving M. Ives and Edmund Ezra Day. New York State School of Industrial and Labor Relations. LCCN a64007445. OCLC 18129346.
- Expanding Liberty: Freedom's Gains in Postwar America. Viking Press. 1966. LCCN 66011354. OCLC 229461.
- Religious Liberty and Conscience: A Constitutional Inquiry. Viking Press. 1968. LCCN 68031398.
- Law and Social Action: Selected Essays of Alexander H. Pekelis. Da Capo Press. 1970. LCCN 77087376.
- Judaism and Human Rights. W. W. Norton. 1972. ISBN 978-0393043570. Edited by Konvitz and with several of his essays. A second edition was published in 2001.
- The Recognition of Ralph Waldo Emerson: Selected Criticism since 1837. University of Michigan Press. 1972. ISBN 978-0472085088. Edited by Konvitz.
- Liberian Code of Laws Revised. Cornell University Press. 1973. ISBN 978-0801407093.
- Profane Religion and Sacred Law. Cornell University Press. 1977. OCLC 4895106.
- Judaism and the American Idea. Cornell University Press. 1978. ISBN 978-0801411816.
- The Legacy of Horace M. Kallen. Fairleigh Dickinson University Press. 1987. ISBN 978-0838632918. Edited by Konvitz.
- Torah and Constitution: Essays in American Jewish Thought. Syracuse University Press. 1998. ISBN 978-0815627555.
- Nine American Jewish Thinkers. Transaction Publishers. 2000. ISBN 978-0765800282.
- Fundamental Rights: History of a Constitutional Doctrine. Transaction Publishers. 2001. ISBN 978-0765800411.
