= Zacharia B. Roberts =

Liberian minister (1834-?)

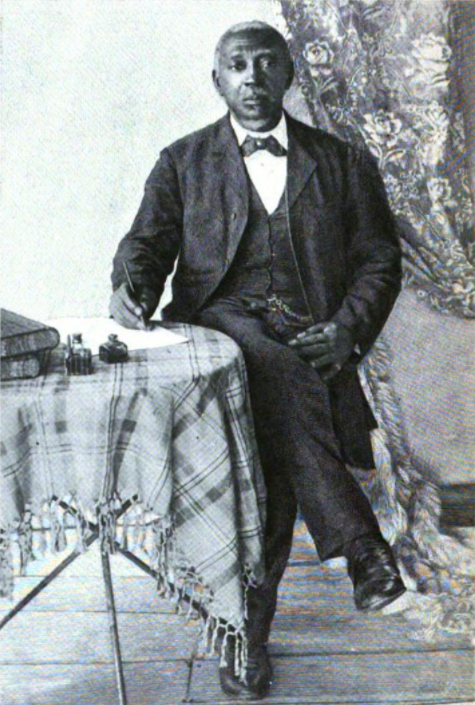
- Roberts in 1897

Chief Justice of Liberia
- In office 1895–1910
- Preceded by: C. L. Parsons
- Succeeded by: James A. Toliver

Personal details
- Born: September 24, 1834 Savannah, Georgia, U.S.

Zacharia B. Roberts (September 24, 1834 – ?) was an American-born Liberian minister, jurist and politician who served as Chief Justice of Liberia from 1895 to 1910.

== Biography ==
Roberts was born on September 24, 1834, in Savannah, Georgia, U.S. He emigrated to Liberia in May 1849, sailing on the boat Huma and arriving at Sinoe on June 27, 1849. A student of theology, he entered the Baptist mission school at Grand Bassa in 1853, under the teaching of Rev. John H. Cheesman. He was ordained a Christian minister in 1858. In 1859, it was noted in the African Repository that Roberts was "laboring earnestly at Sino[e], and preaching to the natives in its vicinity". Late in his life, he was a church elder and still occasionally preached.

Roberts began studying law in the late 1850s and was admitted to the bar in 1860. He was a successful attorney in the subsequent years. In 1863, he entered politics, winning election to the House of Representatives of Liberia. The journal Liberia noted that, "As a legislator he distinguished himself by securing the passage of several acts incorporating the native tribes into the body politic". After four years in the House of Representatives, he ran for office to the Senate of Liberia and won election, serving five years in that body. He also held the political positions of state attorney and commissioner to the native tribes of the interior.

Roberts served as a judge of the county court. By 1882, he held the role of judge of court of quarter sessions and common pleas. In 1884, he became an associate justice of the Supreme Court of Liberia, a role he held through 1894. After the resignation of Chief Justice C. L. Parsons, Roberts was appointed by President Joseph James Cheeseman in 1895 to become the new Chief Justice of Liberia. He served in this role until 1910, when he was succeeded by James A. Toliver.

Roberts received several honors, including being named an honorary Doctor of Laws by Liberia College. He was also named Knight Commander of the Humane Order of African Redemption by President Hilary R. W. Johnson.
