= Gloria Scott =

Gloria Scott may refer to:

- Gloria Randle Scott (born 1938), American educator, and former head of the Girl Scouts of the USA
- Gloria Scott (singer) (born 1946), American singer
- Gloria Musu-Scott, former Chief Justice of Liberia
- Gloria Scott, a fictional ship featured in The Adventure of the Gloria Scott, a Sherlock Holmes story
- Gloria Scott, a Hollywood drugs counselor whose friendship with the Red Hot Chili Peppers and subsequent illness and death inspired their song Venice Queen.
