= Emmanuel Gbalazeh =

Liberian judge (1934–2009)

16th Chief Justice of Liberia
- In office 28 January 1988 – September 1990
- Nominated by: Samuel Doe
- Preceded by: Chea Cheapoo
- Succeeded by: James Bull

Chief Justice of the People's Supreme Court of Liberia
- In office April 1980 – 15 January 1986
- Preceded by: James A. A. Pierre
- Succeeded by: James N. Nagbe

Personal details
- Born: 12 August 1934 Sanniquellie, Liberia
- Died: 2 April 2009 (aged 74) Monrovia, Liberia
- Education: University of Liberia; Louis Arthur Grimes School of Law

Emmanuel N. Gbalazeh (12 August 1934 – 2 April 2009) served as the 16th Chief Justice of Liberia from 1988 until the collapse of the Liberian government in September 1990. He had previously served as the Chief Justice of the People's Supreme Court under the People's Redemption Council from 1980 to 1986.

Born in Sanniquellie, Nimba County, Gbalazeh studied at the University of Liberia before earning his LL.B. at the Louis Arthur Grimes School of Law. He served as a Circuit Court judge in Nimba Country from 1967 to 1969, and later served as Assistant Minister of Justice in the Tolbert administration from 1972 to 1974 before entering private practice.

Following the suspension of the Liberian Constitution as a result of a military coup in April 1980, Gbalazeh was appointed Chief Justice of the newly formed People's Supreme Court by the ruling People's Redemption Council. Gbalazeh swore in the newly elected President Samuel Doe on 6 January 1986 and stepped down on 15 January during the transition from military to civilian rule. Gbalazeh became the focus of a nationwide controversy after revoking the law license of Jenkins K.Z.B. Scott. Because Scott was at that point the Minister of Justice, the Head of State Samuel Doe ordered the Chief Justice to reverse himself, claiming that debarring the Minister of Justice amounted to removing him from office and that only the Head of State might remove government ministers.

Following the impeachment and conviction of Chief Justice Chea Cheapoo in December 1987, Doe nominated Gbalazeh to replace him as Chief Justice. He was confirmed and sworn in on 28 January 1988.

As a result of the outbreak of the First Liberian Civil War and the execution of Samuel Doe in September 1990, the Government of Liberia collapsed, and Gbalazeh vacated his position. He died on 2 April 2009.

Legal offices
Preceded by Chea Cheapoo	Chief Justice of Liberia; 1988-1990	Succeeded by James Bull
Preceded by James A. A. Pierre	Chief Justice of People's Supreme Court; 1980-1986	Succeeded by James N. Nagbe
