= Chea Cheapoo =

Liberian judge (1942–2020)

15th Chief Justice of Liberia
- In office July 1987 – 2 December 1987
- Nominated by: Samuel Doe
- Preceded by: James N. Nagbe
- Succeeded by: Emmanuel Gbalazeh

Personal details
- Born: 2 November 1942 Kiteabo, Webbo District, Grand Gedeh County, Liberia
- Died: 16 September 2020 (aged 77) Caldwell, New Georgia, Montserrado County, Liberia
- Education: Booker Washington Institute; North Carolina Central University

Chea Cheapoo, Sr. (2 November 1942 – 16 September 2020) was a Liberian politician who served as the 15th chief justice of Liberia from July 1987 until his impeachment and removal from office on December 2 of that year. His full rights were later restored by an act of legislature.

== Early life and education ==
Cheapoo was born on 2 November 1942 in Kiteabo, which was located in the former Webbo District of Grand Gedeh County. He studied first at the Assembly of God school in Pleebo, then at Monrovia College. In 1961, he earned a diploma in bookkeeping from the Booker Washington Institute. He graduated from the North Carolina Central University School of Law in 1970.

== Entry into politics ==
After earning his law degree, Cheapoo returned to Liberia and joined the Ministry of Commerce and Industry. He later became an assistant minister in the Ministry of Justice.

Cheapoo served in the late 1970s as a senator from Grand Gedeh County as a member of the ruling True Whig Party, but was forced out after disagreeing with party leaders. He then entered private practice. Soon after, Cheapoo joined the Progressive Alliance of Liberia (PAL), an opposition movement, and became its head counsellor. In early 1980, he served as a spokesman for its successor, the Progressive People's Party (PPP). That same year, the ruling Whigs banned the PPP; Cheapoo and other party leaders were imprisoned on charges of treason.

== Judicial appointments ==
Following the overthrow of the Tolbert government in an April 1980 coup, Cheapoo was freed from prison and appointed Attorney General under the People's Redemption Council regime. However, Cheapoo was removed from his position and arrested in September 1981 after being accused of stockpiling arms without permission of the PRC.

Following the resignation of Chief Justice James N. Nagbe in June 1987, Cheapoo was appointed by President Samuel Doe as Chief Justice. Soon after taking office, he was accused of illegally ordering the arrest of a probate judge and his wife, Harper S. Bailey and Muna Stubblefield, whom he stated had tried to bribe him with $2,000. Amid the resulting controversy, he accused President Doe of unconstitutionally releasing the couple in question, but he submitted to President Doe his resignation on 10 November 1987, but Doe rejected it and called for him to be punished with the removal of his citizenship. Consequently, he was impeached by the House of Representatives later in the month, and the Senate convicted him and removed him from office on 2 December on charges of violating the Constitution while in office. The vote was nearly unanimous; only David Menyongai of Margibi County voted to acquit.

Cheapoo was the first government official to be impeached in Liberia's history. Shortly after his deposition, he was arrested on a charge of defaming President Doe, but he received substantial popular support: he was cheered by crowds of commoners as he went to trial, and the Montserrado County bar association voted to boycott Judge Bailey's courtroom until his removal.

== Postwar activities ==
The Transitional Legislature of Liberia passed a resolution to restore Cheapoo's rights and privileges as a citizen of Liberia on 12 July 1994. He later became Chairman of the Liberia National Conference, which represented unarmed citizens in the Abuja Accord that ended the First Liberian Civil War. He testified before the Truth and Reconciliation Commission in 2008 about the events of the 1980 coup, including unsubstantiated claims of CIA involvement contradicted by his former colleagues.

== Elections ==
Cheapoo participated in the 1997 general elections as the standard bearer of a reconstituted Progressive People's Party (PPP). As the party's candidate for president, Cheapoo won only 0.34% of the vote, while the party failed to win any seats in the legislature. The party did not field candidates in the 2005 elections. Cheapoo was once again the party's candidate for president in 2011; he received 0.3% of the vote, and the PPP won no seats in the legislature.

== Death ==
Cheapoo died at the house of one of his sons in Caldwell, New Georgia, on 16 September 2020.

Legal offices
Preceded by James N. Nagbe	Chief Justice of Liberia; 1987	Succeeded by Emmanuel Gbalazeh
