= Temple of Justice =

Temple of Justice may refer to:

- Temple of Justice (Liberia)
- Temple of Justice (Washington)
