= A. Dash Wilson =

Liberian judge

Anthony Dashward Wilson, Sr
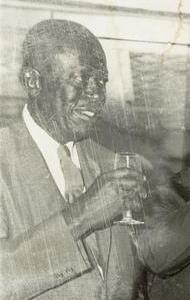
- Wilson c. 1950–60

12th Chief Justice of Liberia
- In office 1958–1971
- Nominated by: William Tubman
- Preceded by: H. Nimine Russell
- Succeeded by: James A. A. Pierre

Anthony Dashward Wilson, Sr was a Liberian politician who served as the 12th Chief Justice of Liberia from 1958 to 1971. Born on 2 April 1898 in Harper, he was graduated from Cuttington College. Entering into public service, he occupied multiple bureaucratic positions before being elected to the national legislature. Following a period of time in the House of Representatives, he was elected to the Senate, in which he served until President Tubman appointed him to the Supreme Court on 13 March 1958.

Wilson was the father of multiple daughters; the oldest, born in 1926, was Mrs. Richard Malvinier Gardener. In November 1968, Wilson was critically injured in an automobile accident; he was flown to the United Kingdom for medical treatment and spent more than half a year outside the country, only returning to the bench at the end of the following June. During his absence, Lawrence Mitchell served as the Chief Justice Ad Interim.

Legal offices
Preceded by H. Nimine Russell	Chief Justice of Liberia; 1958-1970	Succeeded by James A. A. Pierre
