= Keenan Institute =

Educational organization in Bong County, Liberia

The Keenan Institute is an educational organization located in Bong County, Liberia. It was founded in 1998 by the Reverend and Mrs. Prince Wreh. The name honors Steve and Jackie Keenan, former Peace Corps teachers in Liberia.

The institute was founded to provide basic education to the many children and young adults who, as a result of the Second Liberian Civil War, were denied a formal education. Initially it was a vocational school offering basic skills in carpentry, welding, and business mathematics. The institute grew to offer computer science, baking, hairdressing and sewing. In 2011 the ground was broken for a non-denominational elementary school. In September 2012 the Goll Farm Community School opened with grades pre-K to sixth. The school is certified and licensed by the Ministry of Education.

The school is located in the Jorquelleh District of Bong County, adjacent to the campus of Cuttington University.

In 2014 the Goll Farm School expanded to include pre-K to grade eight. The school closed for six months during the Ebola crisis in Liberia, and re-opened in September 2015 with over 300 students enrolled.

Vocational training is no longer a focus, though young women are offered special classes in hairdressing, computer training and family counseling. Special training is offered to the community, with emphasis on hygiene and disease prevention.

The Keenan Institute has developed a relationship with the program "Liberia Reads". Partially funded by the NGO Friends of Liberia, it trains teachers in the art of teaching reading.
