= Sarah Safyn Fyneah =

Liberian diplomat

Ambassador Sarah Safyn Fyneah

Former Permanent Representative of Liberia to the UN
- In office February 2023 – October 2024
- Appointed by: George Weah
- Preceded by: Dee-Maxwell Saah Kemayah

Former Minister Plenipotentiary at Liberia’s Embassy in United States
- In office 2021–2023

Personal details
- Born: 1965 (age 60–61) Liberia
- Education: University of Liberia
- Occupation: Diplomat

Sarah Safyn Fyneah is a Liberian diplomat, she served as the country's Permanent Representative to the United Nations, based in New York, from February 2023 to October 2024. Appointed by President George M. Weah in September 2023, Fyneah became the fifth Liberian woman to hold this position since Liberia established its diplomatic presence at the UN in 1949. Before this role, Fyneah served as Deputy Chief of Mission at the Liberian Embassy in Washington, D.C., and as Chargé d'Affaires to Ethiopia, the African Union, and the United Nations Economic Commission for Africa (UNECA). Throughout her diplomatic career, Fyneah has been engaged in multilateral diplomacy, advocating for Liberia's interests on global platforms, including advocating for a non-permanent seat on the United Nations Security Council for the 2026–2027 term, a promise she made at the Senate Confirmation Hearing in 2022.

== Education ==
In 1989, Fyneah earned a degree from the University of Liberia in mass communications. She attended the Gabriel L. Dennis Foreign Service Institute for a post-graduate diploma in diplomacy and international relations which she obtained in 2007. Between 2016 and 2019, she pursued a master's in development studies at Addis Ababa University.

== Career ==
=== Diplomacy ===
Fyneah began her diplomatic career in 2009, at the Embassy of Liberia in Sierra Leone, under the Development Diplomat Training Program. In 2010, she became the Special Assistant to Liberia's Minister of Foreign Affairs until 2014.

From 2014 to 2016, Fyneah served as Minister Counsellor and Deputy Chief of Mission at Liberia's Embassy in Doha, Qatar. She was later stationed in Ethiopia, also accredited to the African Union and the United Nations Economic Commission for Africa in the capacity of Minister Counsellor. During the period, she also served as Chargé d’Affaires ad interim until 2021, when she was posted to the United States as Minister Plenipotentiary/Deputy Chief of Mission at Liberia's Embassy in Washington, D.C.

In September 2022, Fyneah was appointed as Liberia's Permanent Representative to the United Nations. Fyneah spearheaded Liberia's efforts to obtain a non-permanent seat on the United Nations Security Council for the 2026–2027 term.

Fyneah stepped down from her role, she met with UN Secretary-General António Guterres to formally take her leave on October 7, 2024.
