= James N. Nagbe =

Liberian judge

14th Chief Justice of Liberia
- In office 16 January 1986 – 18 June 1987
- Nominated by: Samuel Doe
- Preceded by: Emmanuel Gbalazeh
- Succeeded by: Chea Cheapoo

James Nagbe Nagbe served as the 14th Chief Justice of Liberia from 1986 until his resignation in 1987.

Nagbe represented Montserrado County during the 1983 Constitutional Convention to draft a new constitution for the country due to the previous constitution's suspension after the 1980 coup d'état. On 16 January 1986, the newly elected President Samuel Doe nominated Nagbe to become the Chief Justice of Liberia, replacing the transitional Chief Justice, Emmanuel Gbalazeh. However, Nagbe was unconstitutionally forced to resign by Doe on 18 June 1987, along with the entire Supreme Court bench.

Legal offices
| Preceded by Emmanuel Gbalazeh | Chief Justice of Liberia; 1986-1987 | Succeeded by Chea Cheapoo |
