= Roosevelt Jayjay =

Liberian government administrator

Roosevelt Jayjay is a Liberian government administrator.

== Background ==
While a student at Cuttington University, he spent his 1974 summer vacation working for the Bong Mining Company, where he developed an interest in mining affairs. After earning his bachelor's degree from Cuttington and his master's degree in public affairs from the University of Oregon in the USA, he embarked on a governmental career. Although he was employed by the United Nations Development Programme for a time, most of his career has been spent in the Government of Liberia; he has held the positions of the Minister of Posts and Telegraphs and the Deputy Chief of the Mission for the ECOWAS Commission in Liberia, as well as assisting the Liberian branch of Habitat for Humanity, sitting in the Margibi County Traditional Legislative Assembly, and teaching at Cuttington and the University of Liberia. In 2011, he returned to mining and to GOL service after being appointed Minister of Mines by President Sirleaf; he succeeded Eugene Shannon, who resigned to run for the Legislature from Grand Cape Mount County.
