= Fish Town =

City in River Gee County, Liberia

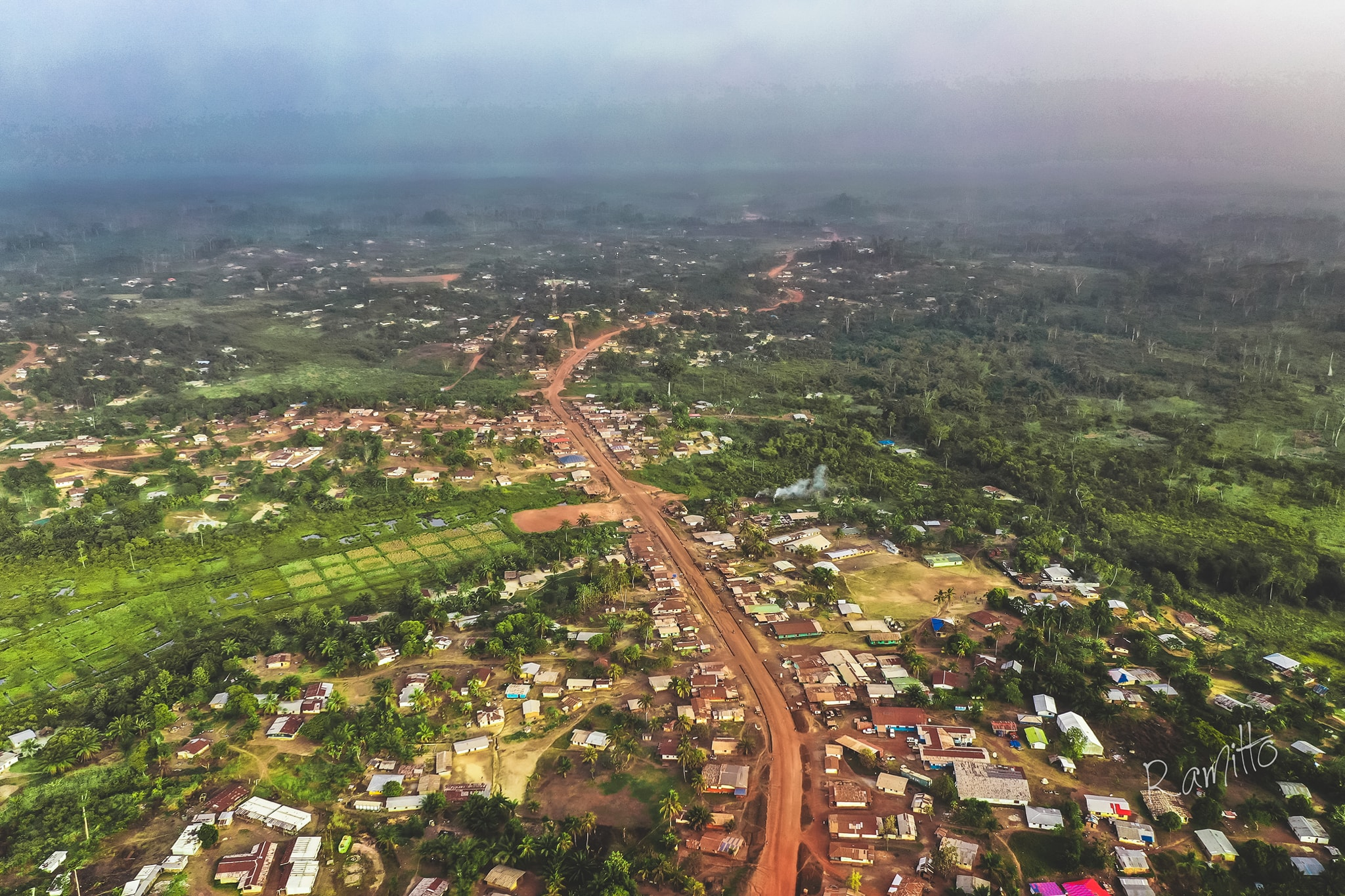

- Location in Liberia
- Coordinates: 5°11′47″N 7°52′32″W
- Country: Liberia
- County: River Gee County

Population (2008)
  - Total: 3,328
- Time zone: UTC+0
- Climate: Af
- Language: English

Fish Town is the capital city of River Gee County, Liberia. As of the 2008 national census, the population stood at 3,328.

== Origin ==
Fish Town earned its name after a nearby creek, called Neseme. In the Grebo language, Ne (/niː/) is water or river/creek and Seme is fish. Initially, Fish Town was called Nesemekon or "on top of Neseme" consistent with the Grebo naming convention for towns and villages. Later, the use of English became compulsory and speaking Palipo or other dialects was prohibited. English was required on school campuses and students translated the name of the town into English renaming Nesemekon to Fish Town.

== Other information ==
Created in 2000, River Gee County is one of the five southeastern counties. Its population is largely Grebo. The interior was mapped in 1933, during the administration of President Edwin J. Barclay, and divided into three provinces: Eastern, Central, and Western. Until 2000, River Gee and Grand Gedeh Counties were separate districts; River Gee came out of Webbo District that was administered by Maryland County and Grand Gedeh came out of Tchien District administered by Sinoe County. Both composed the Eastern Province, which in 1964 became Grand Gedeh.
