= Olubanke King Akerele =

Liberian politician and diplomat (born 1946)

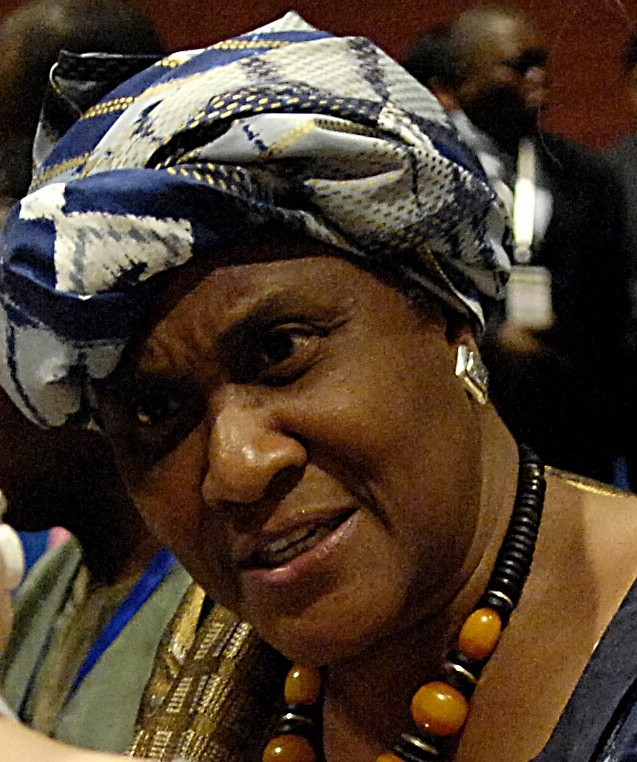
- Akerele at the African Union Summit in 2008

Minister of Foreign Affairs of Liberia
- In office August 22, 2007 – November 3, 2010
- Appointed by: Ellen Johnson Sirleaf
- Preceded by: George Wallace
- Succeeded by: Toga G. McIntosh

Minister of Commerce and Industry
- In office 2006–2007
- Appointed by: Ellen Johnson Sirleaf

Personal details
- Born: May 11, 1946 (age 80)
- Relations: Charles D. B. King (grandfather)

Olubanke King Akerele (born May 11, 1946) is a Liberian politician and diplomat who served as the Minister of Foreign Affairs in the cabinet of Ellen Johnson Sirleaf from October 2007 until her resignation on 3 November 2010. She is the granddaughter of Charles D. B. King, Liberia's 17th president.

Akerele studied at the University of Ibadan in Nigeria and graduated from Brandeis University in Massachusetts, United States with a B.A. in economics. She earned her first M.A. from Northeastern University in manpower economics, then a second M.A. from Columbia University in economics of education. Akerele also completed her first year at the University of Liberia Louis Arthur Grimes School of Law. She later served for over 20 years at the United Nations.

Upon the election of Sirleaf as president in 2005, Akerele was appointed the Minister of Commerce and Industry. Following a 2007 cabinet shakeup, she replaced veteran diplomat George Wallace as Minister of Foreign Affairs. On 3 November 2010, Sirleaf dismissed her entire cabinet, including Akerele. She resigned that same day. Following the appointment of Toga G. McIntosh as Akerele's successor, Sirleaf disclosed that Akerele had resigned in order to receive medical treatment for an undisclosed illness.

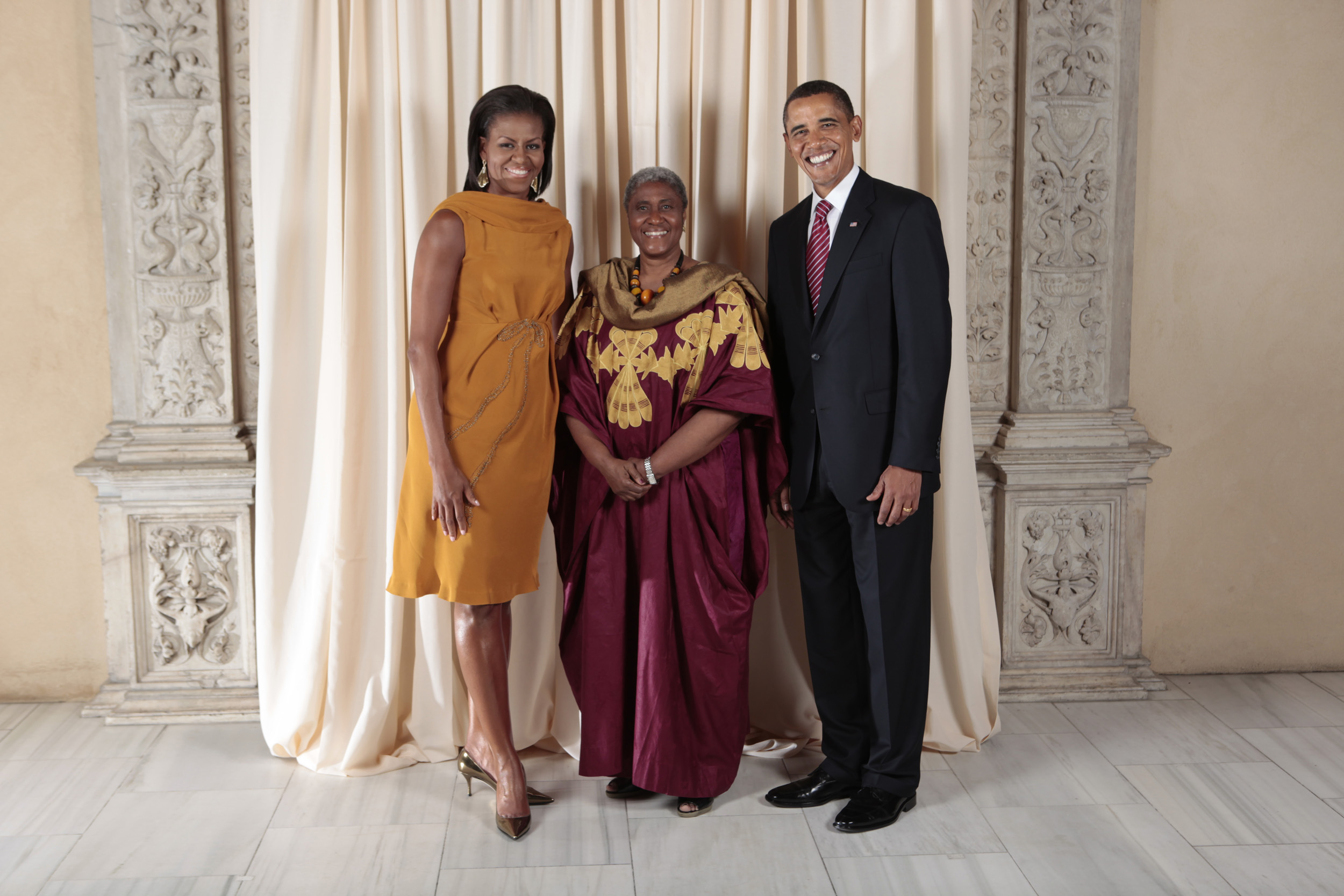
U.S. President Barack Obama and First Lady Michelle Obama at the Metropolitan Museum with Olubanke King Akerele in 2009.

== Sources ==
- "Liberian leader reshuffles cabinet" 24 August 2007, IOL.co.za
- "President Sirleaf Calls Newly Reconstituted Cabinet ‘The Right People for the Job’" 4 December 2010, emansion.gov.lr
