= Kafumba Konneh =

Liberian activist

Sheikh Kafumba Konneh (4 February 1944 – 20 July 2015) was a Liberian Muslim leader, prominent peace activist and member of the Truth and Reconciliation Commission of Liberia, which was founded in 2005. He died in Tope Village, Gardnersville, Monrovia in 2015.

== Sources ==
- Biography at trcofliberia.org
