= Johnnie Lewis =

Liberian lawyer and politician

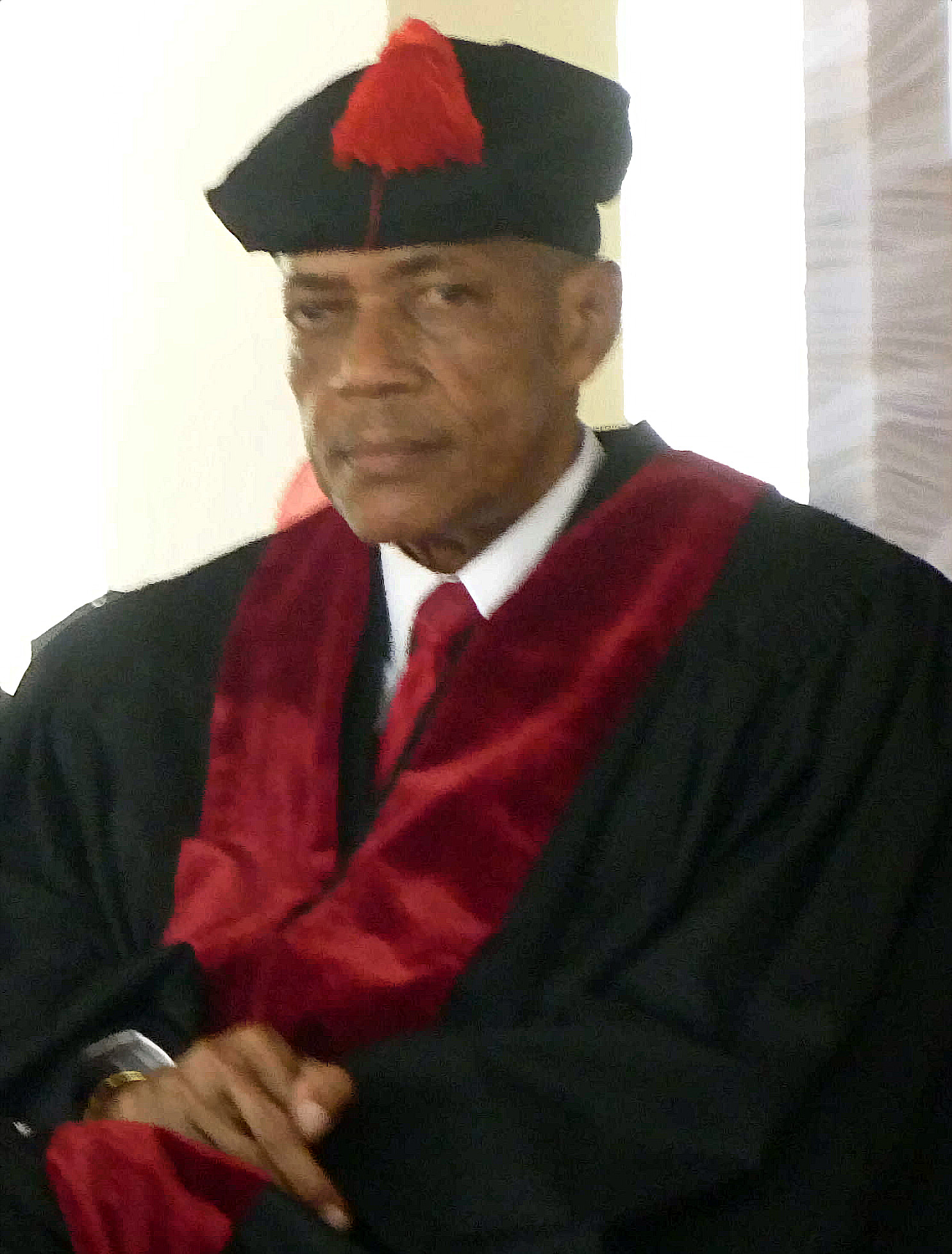
- Lewis in 2012

18th Chief Justice of Liberia
- In office March 3, 2006 – September 10, 2012
- Nominated by: Ellen Johnson Sirleaf
- Preceded by: Henry Reed Cooper
- Succeeded by: Francis Korkpor

Personal details
- Born: April 16, 1946 Greenville, Sinoe County, Liberia
- Died: January 21, 2015 (aged 68) Monrovia, Liberia
- Education: University of Liberia; L.A. Grimes School of Law; Yale Law School

Johnnie N. Lewis (April 16, 1946 – January 21, 2015) was a Liberian lawyer and politician who served as the 18th Chief Justice of Liberia from 2006 to 2012. Before his appointment to the Supreme Court, he served as a circuit judge in Liberia's judicial system.

== Early life ==
Johnnie N. Lewis was born to Roderick N. Lewis and Mary Houston-Lewis in Greenville, Sinoe County, Liberia on April 16, 1946. His father was a lawyer and his mother was a school teacher; he had three brothers and two sisters. Lewis studied at St. Joseph's Catholic Elementary School followed by Sinoe High School.

After finishing high school, Lewis attended the University of Liberia in Monrovia where he earned first a Bachelor of Arts, then a Bachelor of Laws from the university's Louis Arthur Grimes School of Law. He was the editor of the Liberian Law Journal during his time in law school, and graduated cum laude in 1969. After he was called to the bar that year, Lewis traveled to the United States to study at Yale Law School. He completed his Master of Laws in 1971.

== Legal career ==
After graduating from Yale, Lewis returned to Liberia. He was admitted to practice before the Supreme Court of Liberia; he also became an associate professor at his former law school. In 1975, he was appointed as Judge of the Third Judicial Circuit Court in Sinoe County by President William R. Tolbert, Jr., replacing his late father Roderick. In 1980, the government fell in a coup, so Lewis left the judiciary and resumed his faculty position. He became the school's dean in 1984, and continued in that position until 1991. In that year, he also served as a legal adviser to the interim Liberian president.

In private practice, Lewis was a partner in the Lewis & Lewis Law Offices of Monrovia. In one incident, his home was invaded by gunmen searching for him; though Lewis escaped, one of his nephews was killed for failing to divulge his uncle's whereabouts. Lewis then spent 1993 to 2003 outside of Liberia, working mainly with the United Nations. Employment with that agency led him to Bosnia and Somalia. He also wrote two law textbooks: one on criminal law in Liberia and the other on wills and estates.

In 2006, the Liberian Bar Association recommended Lewis for nomination by President Ellen Johnson Sirleaf as the Chief Justice of the Supreme Court of Liberia. President Johnson-Sirleaf nominated him in February and he was confirmed by the Liberian Senate on March 2, 2006. Lewis was commissioned as the new Chief Justice on March 3. Upon taking office, he vowed to fight corruption that had plagued the judicial branch in the country.

=== The Lewis court ===
Chief Justice Lewis fired 34 judges in Sinoe County in April 2006 after they failed to report to their assigned courts. In July 2006, the car Lewis was riding in to the funeral of former justice Emmanuel Wureh hit and killed a pedestrian who was jaywalking. The car was driven by a court employee and was speeding at the time of the accident in an attempt to catch up with the funeral procession. An angry mob surrounded the vehicle and Lewis and the other passengers had to be rescued by the Liberian National Police.

In a 3–2 decision with Lewis voting in the majority, the court declared the removal of House Speaker Edwin Snowe by the National Legislature was illegal and ordered his reinstatement. The ruling in January 2007 also invalidated other actions of the legislature including a resolution to allow the Legislature to meet at the Unity Conference Center in Virginia while the Capitol Building in Monrovia was being remodeled. This decision created a rift between some members of the legislature, President Johnson-Sirleaf, and the Supreme Court. In August 2007, the court allowed a criminal prosecution for corruption against former leader Gyude Bryant to proceed in the lower courts.

In October 2007, the Chief Justice accused newspapers in the country of deliberately misspelling his name and using pictures of him inappropriately. He threatened to jail the editors and writers if the practice continued for contempt of court. In January 2008, the court affirmed the national government's decision not to hold municipal elections due to budgetary constraints and allowed the President of Liberia to appoint mayors. The court determined that once money was available, the government must hold the elections, which had not been held since 1985. He resigned from the court in September 2012 citing health issues, with September 10 as his last day in office.

Lewis died in Monrovia on January 21, 2015, en route to the John F. Kennedy Medical Center. His funeral was held at St. Thomas Episcopal Church in Monrovia on February 5. He was buried at his family cemetery in Greenville the following day.

Legal offices
Preceded by Henry Reed Cooper	Chief Justice of Liberia; 2006–2012	Next: Francis Korkpor
