= Dede Dolopei =

Liberian civil servant

Dede Dolopei is a Liberian civil servant.

== Information ==
She was the vice-chairperson of the Truth and Reconciliation Commission for Liberia which was wound up in 2010. She has worked in various non-governmental organizations concerning women's rights, peace-building, conflict resolution and psychosocial counseling. She also holds several degrees from the University of Liberia.

== Sources ==
- Short biography on TRC of Liberia
