= Louis Arthur Grimes =

Liberian judge

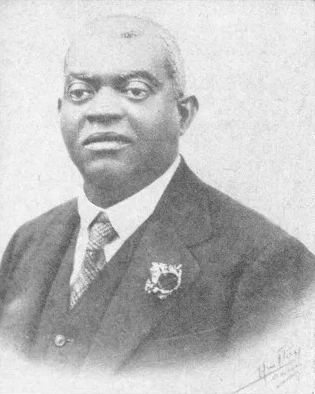

10th Chief Justice of Liberia
- In office 1933–1948
- Nominated by: Edwin Barclay
- Preceded by: F. E. R. Johnson
- Succeeded by: A. Dash Wilson

Personal details
- Born: 1883
- Died: 1948 (aged 64–65) Monrovia, Liberia

Louis Arthur Grimes (1883–1948) served as the 10th Chief Justice of Liberia. He was appointed Attorney General by President Charles D. B. King and served in this position from 1922 to 1932 when he was appointed Secretary of State by President Edwin Barclay. He served in this position from 1932 to 1933. Secretary Grimes was preceded by Edwin Barclay and replaced by Clarence Lorenzo Simpson.

Perhaps Grimes' most significant accomplishment as Secretary of State was his successful defense of Liberia at the League of Nations when it was threatened with loss of its sovereignty as a result of charges that the country was participating in state sanctioned slave trading. In 1933 he was appointed Chief Justice a position he served in until his death in 1948. The Louis Arthur Grimes School of Law at the University of Liberia is named for him. He was a 1905 graduate of Liberia College.

Justice Grimes' legacy was continued by his children, including Henry W. Grimes who was a pioneer in telecommunications in Liberia, Joseph Rudolph Grimes, the longest serving Secretary of State in Liberia and a primary author of the charter for the Organization of African Unity (OAU), and Dr. Mary Antoinette Brown-Sherman, the first woman on the African continent to be the president of a major university.

== Bibliography ==
- Sherman, Mary Antoinette Brown (2005). Jellemoh, The New World African Press.

Legal offices
Preceded by F. E. R. Johnson	Chief Justice of Liberia; 1933 – 1948	Succeeded by A. Dash Wilson
