= Ross Brann =

American religious historian

Academic background
- Education: University of California, Berkeley; New York University; Hebrew University of Jerusalem

Academic work
- Discipline: Religious history
- Institutions: Cornell University

Ross Brann is an American religious historian, currently the Milton R. Konvitz Professor of Judeo-Islamic Studies at Cornell University.

== Published works ==
- The Compunctious Poet: Cultural Ambiguity and Hebrew Poetry in Muslim Spain (Johns Hopkins University Press, 1991).
- Power in the Portrayal: Representations of Muslims and Jews in Islamic Spain (Princeton University Press, 2002).
- Iberian Moorings: Al-Andalus, Sefarad and the Tropes of Exceptionalism (University of Pennsylvania Press, 2021).
- Moses Maimonides: A Very Short Introduction (Oxford University Press, 2024).

== Awards ==
- 1992: National Jewish Book Award in the Sephardic Studies category for The Compunctious Poet: Cultural Ambiguity and Hebrew Poetry in Muslim Spain
