= Al-Hassan Conteh =

Liberian diplomat and academic

Dr. Al-Hassan Conteh is a Liberian academic and diplomat who also served as the President of the University of Liberia. Conteh earned his doctorate at the University of Pennsylvania in 1993.

== Faculty and Diplomatic Experience ==
Prof. Conteh has previously been a faculty of the African Studies Center of the University of Pennsylvania and the department of Geography, Environment and Urban Studies at Temple University. Conteh was also a Research Fellow at the Solomon Asch Center for Study of Ethno-political Conflict at Pennsylvania from 2001 to 2005. He served as the 12th president of the University of Liberia from 1 December 2004, until 2008 and was succeeded by Dr. Emmett Dennis. Conteh is former Liberia's Ambassador Extraordinary and Plenipotentiary to the Federal Republic of Nigeria and the Economic Community of West African States (ECOWAS). ECOWASAll Africa. He was the Deputy Dean of the Diplomatic Corps in Nigeria and Dean of the Permanent Representative Committee of ECOWAS.

He served as the Acting President of the University of Liberia from April 2024 to January 2025 and oversaw the university's operations and the inauguration of the 16th President of the University of Liberia, Prof. Dr. Layli Maparyan. Dr. Conteh is now the Ambassador of Liberia to the United States of America.

== Sources ==
- Biography at unpenn.edu
