= Gloria Musu-Scott =

Liberian politician and jurist

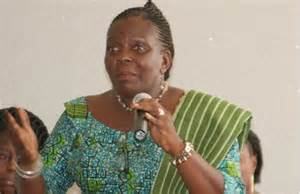
- Musu-Scott in 2015

Chief Justice of the Supreme Court of Liberia
- In office 1997–2003

Gloria Maya Musu-Scott is a former Liberian politician and jurist who served as Chief Justice of the Supreme Court from 1997 until 2003. She and three other family members were convicted of murder in 2023 in connection with the death of her niece. Following an appeal, she and her family members were acquitted by the Supreme Court.

== Early life and education ==
Scott was born in Monrovia and is a member of the Grebo people. She has a bachelor's degree in economics and a law degree from the University of Liberia and an LLM from Harvard Law School in 2017.

== Career ==
Scott is a member of the Liberian National Bar Association and a co-founder of the Association of Female Lawyers of Liberia. She was an assistant professor at the Louis Arthur Grimes School of Law at the University of Liberia.

Scott was appointed Chief Justice of the five member Supreme Court in 1997, after the court was reconstituted following the civil war and the election of Charles Taylor. In February 2003, Scott read a ruling of the court which said it did not have legal jurisdiction over the rebel Liberians United for Reconciliation and Democracy to stop the second civil war in order to conduct a national census prior to the 2003 election. She served on the court until August 2003, when the transitional government took effect.

At the 2005 elections, Scott became the Junior Senator for Maryland County, representing the Unity Party. In 2008, she spoke to the Truth and Reconciliation Commission about the need to look further beyond the events of 1979. She lost her Senate seat in the 2011 election.

Scott was the chairperson of the Constitution Review Committee which convened from 2013 until 2015. The CRC visited all 73 electoral districts and collected a total of 56,729 views from citizens. In this role, Scott advocated for the participation of women as well as for the education of girls. Scott presented the Committee's final report to President Ellen Johnson Sirleaf in August 2015.

In 2016, Scott was named as one of a number of judges said to be bad debtors by the Liberia Banker Association, which said she had failed to pay $11,241.04 (~$15,080 in 2025) owed to the Liberian Bank for Development and Investment.

== Murder conviction and acquittal ==
In December 2023, Musu-Scott and three female family members were convicted of the stabbing murder of her niece Charlotte Musu in February 2023. The defendants were also found guilty of conspiracy and making a false report to law enforcement. Musu-Scott maintained that her niece had been killed by home invaders and alleged that the jury had been bribed to return a guilty verdict. She and the other defendants were sentenced to life in prison and interned at the Monrovia Central Prison. Musu-Scott subsequently lodged an appeal with the Supreme Court of Liberia. On 28 August 2024, Musu-Scott and her family members were acquitted by the Supreme Court.
