= George Wallace (diplomat) =

Liberian politician

George W. Wallace Jr. (born May 30, 1938) is a Liberian diplomat who served as the foreign minister of Liberia from 2006 to 2007. He took office early in 2006, having been appointed to the cabinet of the incoming president Ellen Johnson Sirleaf and confirmed by the Senate. Wallace has had a long career as a diplomat and ambassador through all of its governments during the past several decades. In a cabinet reshuffle on August 22, 2007, he was replaced as foreign minister by Olubanka King Akerele and became special adviser to President Johnson Sirleaf instead.

Wallace was born to George Wallace and Elizabeth Yebade Wallace in Monrovia, Liberia.

== Political career ==
=== Zero-tax treatment ===
During a visit to Liberia with Chinese President Hu Jingtao, Mr. Bo Xilai and Wallace, signed a document to increase the scope of zero-tariff treatment for goods imported from Liberia to 442 tax items.
