= Jerome Verdier =

Liberian activist and lawyer

Jerome J. Verdier Sr. is a leading human rights activist and environmental lawyer in Liberia. In 2006, Verdier was also selected to serve as chairperson of the Truth and Reconciliation Committee for Liberia.

Verdier is a multiple graduate of the University of Liberia. He received his Bachelor of Business Administration in 1988 as well as a Bachelor of Laws degree in the same year from the school's Louis Arthur Grimes School of Law. He received a Bachelor of Science in management from the Georgia Institute of Technology in 2009.

Verdier is a practicing attorney in Liberia and has successfully filed suit against the government on multiple occasions.
