= Teeko Tozay Yorlay =

Liberian diplomat

Ambassador Teeko Tozay Yorlay

Ambassador of Liberia to France
- In office November 2024 – present
- Appointed by: Joseph Boakai
- Preceded by: Geraldine Bass-Golokeh

Personal details
- Born: March 6, 1981 (age 45) Nimba County, Liberia
- Party: Liberty Party
- Education: University of Liberia; University of the Witwatersrand; Durban University of Technology
- Occupation: Diplomat

Teeko Tozay Yorlay also known as Teeko T. Yorlay (born March 6, 1981), is a Liberian diplomat. Since November 2024, he has served as Liberia’s Ambassador Extraordinary and Plenipotentiary to France and Permanent Delegate to UNESCO, with concurrent accreditation to Spain, Portugal, Greece, Switzerland, Cyprus, and Monaco. Prior to his appointment, he worked with the MONUSCO and the UN Departments of Political and Peacebuilding Affairs in New York. In Liberia, he previously held senior positions at the Internal Affairs Ministry, Ministry of Youth and Sports, and the Gender, Children and Social Protection Ministry.

== Early life and education ==
Yorlay was born on March 6, 1981, in Nimba County, Liberia. He earned a Bachelor of Arts in Political Science from the University of Liberia in 2009, followed by a Master of Arts in International Relations in 2011 from the same institution. He later obtained a Postgraduate Diploma in Public and Development Sector Monitoring and Evaluation from the University of the Witwatersrand, South Africa in 2017, and completed a PhD in Management Sciences specializing in Public Administration-Peace Studies at the Durban University of Technology in 2023.

== Career ==
Yorlay served as a youth representative commissioner at Liberia Aids Commission from 2008 to 2012. In addition, he served as Assistant to the Liberia Minister of Internal Affairs from May 2010 to June 2012, where he oversaw local-government administration, policy, and project implementation. He was then appointed Assistant Superintendent of Nimba County until late 2014.

In early 2015, he briefly served as Assistant Minister for Youth Development, focusing on youth empowerment. He also served as national Vice Chairman of Liberty Party for a year from 2016. From December 2017 to May 2021, he assisted technically the Minister of Gender, Children and Social Protection. Yorlay served as Officer for Civil Affairs with MONUSCO in the DR Congo based in Goma from June 2021 to March 2023. He was subsequently promoted to Associate Political Affairs Officer at the UN Departments of Political and Peacebuilding Affairs based in New York, until October 2024.

== Diplomatic career ==
In December 2024, Yorlay was appointed as Ambassador Extraordinary and Plenipotentiary of Liberia to France. He is also accredited to Spain, Portugal, Greece, Switzerland, Cyprus, and Monaco and Permanent Delegation of Liberia to UNESCO.

== Disputes ==
In January 2025, Yorlay faced a brief court inquiry over allegations linked to social media activity in Liberia. The matter was resolved within 24 hours when the Monrovia City Court dismissed the case at the state’s request.
