= Chief Justice of Liberia =

Chief judge of the Supreme Court of Liberia

- Coat of arms of Liberia

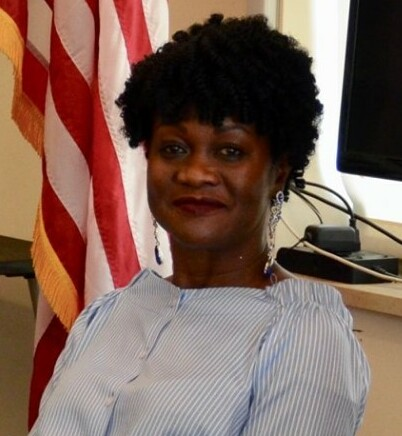
- Incumbent; Sie-A-Nyene Yuoh since 27 September 2022
- Supreme Court of Liberia
- Type: Chief justice
- Seat: Monrovia
- Appointer: Presidential nomination with Senate confirmation
- Term length: 70 years of age
- Constituting instrument: Constitution of Liberia (1847)
- Inaugural holder: Samuel Benedict
- Formation: 1847; 179 years ago

The chief justice of Liberia is the head of the judicial branch of the Government of the Republic of Liberia and the chief judge of the Supreme Court of Liberia.

== Appointment and term ==
Article 54(c) of the Constitution stipulates that the chief justice is appointed by the president of Liberia and confirmed by the Senate. Per Article 68, eligibility for the position of chief justice requires that the candidate:

- Be a citizen of Liberia;
- Be of good moral character;
- Have been a counselor of the Supreme Court Bar for at least five years.

Article 71 states that the chief justice "shall hold their offices during good behavior." According to Article 72(b), the chief justice must retire from office upon reaching the age of 70, though he may remain on the Court long enough to render judgment or perform any judicial duties regarding matters he began addressing before reaching that age.

== Duties ==
In addition to acting as head judge on the Supreme Court and managing all subordinate courts, the Constitution provides several duties to the chief justice. In the case of impeachment of the president or vice president, Article 43 mandates that the chief justice preside over the trial in the Senate. Additionally, Article 53(a) requires the chief justice to swear in the president in front of a joint session of the Legislature.

== Removal from office ==
The chief justice may be removed from office upon impeachment by the House of Representatives and conviction by the Senate. Article 71 of the Constitution stipulates that the chief justice may only be removed in the event of "misconduct, gross breach of duty, inability to perform the functions of their office, or conviction in a court of law for treason, bribery or other infamous crimes." In the event of an impeachment trial of the chief justice in the Senate, the president of the Senate presides over the proceedings.

Only one chief justice, Chea Cheapoo, has been removed in this manner.

== List of chief justices ==
Status

Denotes service as chief justice in extra-constitutional transitional government

No.	Portrait	Name (Birth–Death)	Tenure	Nominated by President
1		Samuel Benedict (1792–1854)	1847–1854	Joseph Jenkins Roberts
2		John Day (1797–1859)	1854 – 15 February 1859	Joseph Jenkins Roberts
3		Boston Jenkins Drayton (1821–1865)	1861–1864	Stephen Allen Benson
4		Edward James Roye (1815–1872)	1865–1868	Daniel Bashiel Warner
5		C. L. Parsons	1869–1894	James Spriggs Payne
6		Zacharia B. Roberts	1895–1910	Joseph James Cheeseman
7		James A. Toliver	1911–1913	Arthur Barclay
8		J. J. Dossen (1866–1924)	1913–1924	Daniel Edward Howard
9		F. E. R. Johnson	1924–1933	Charles D. B. King
10		Louis Arthur Grimes (1883–1948)	1933–1948	Edwin Barclay
11		H. Nimine Russell	1949–1956	William Tubman
12		A. Dash Wilson (1898–?)	13 March 1958 – 1970	William Tubman
13		James A. A. Pierre (1908–1980) (Note: Deposed in the 1980 Liberian coup d'état and executed afterwards.)	1971 – 12 April 1980	William Tubman
—		Emmanuel Gbalazeh (1934–2009)	April 1980 – 15 January 1986	People's Redemption Council
14		James N. Nagbe (Note: Unconstitutionally forced to resign by President Doe, along with the entire Supreme Court bench.)	16 January 1986 – 18 June 1987	Samuel Doe
15		Chea Cheapoo (1942–2020) (Note: Impeached and removed from office.)	July 1987 – 2 December 1987	Samuel Doe
16		Emmanuel Gbalazeh (1934–2009) (Note: Vacated his position at the end of the First Liberian Civil War.)	28 January 1988 – September 1990	Samuel Doe
—		James G. Bull	1992–1996	Amos Sawyer
—		Frances Johnson-Morris	1996–1997	Ruth Perry
17		Gloria Musu-Scott (Note: Vacated her position at the end of the Second Liberian Civil War.)	1997–2003	Charles Taylor
—		Henry Reed Cooper (1940–2023)	2003–2006	National Transitional Government
18		Johnnie Lewis (1946–2015)	3 March 2006 – 18 September 2012	Ellen Johnson Sirleaf
19		Francis Korkpor (born 1952)	18 April 2013 – 27 September 2022	Ellen Johnson Sirleaf
20		Sie-A-Nyene Yuoh	27 September 2022 – present	George Weah

== Bibliography ==
- Dossen, J. J., Supreme Court reports: Cases argued and determined in the Supreme Judicial Court of the Republic of Liberia, January, 1861-January, 1907, Volume 1.
