= Webbo District =

Coordinates: 4°51′06″N 7°35′51″W

Webbo District (Nyaake) was a district of River Gee County, Liberia.
