= Cuttington University =

Private university in Suacoco, Liberia

- Cuttington University seal
- Motto: Sancte et Sapiente (Latin)
- Motto in English: "With Holiness and Wisdom"
- Type: Private
- Established: 1889; 137 years ago
- Affiliations: Episcopal Church of the United States
- Location: Suacoco, Bong County, Liberia; 7.040000°N 9.554167°W
- Campus: Suakoko, Kakata, Monrovia
- Website: cu.edu.lr

Cuttington University is a private university in Suacoco, Liberia. Founded in 1889 as Cuttington College by the Episcopal Church of the United States (ECUSA), it is the oldest private, coeducational, four-year, degree-granting institution in sub-Saharan Africa.

== History ==
In 1887, Robert Fulton Cutting, treasurer of the ECUSA, donated $5,000 to an Episcopalian bishop in Liberia for the establishment of a school for teaching Liberian children — regardless of ethnicity — about industry and agriculture. The university was finally established in 1889 by Samuel David Ferguson in Cape Palmas, where it remained until 1929. Named Cuttington College when it opened, M. P. Keda Valentine served as the first principal followed by Samuel Taylor. Among the first private colleges in the West African region, the school was seen as a college for Liberia's elite. Some of the earliest graduates included "two chief justices of the Liberian Supreme Court and three associate justices, one minister of education and many civil servants".

In 1948, the college moved to Suacoco in Bong County, 120 miles north of Liberia's capital of Monrovia. Prior to the First Liberian Civil War, 45% of government officials were alumni of the college. In the wake of the 1980 military coup, the college continued to be favoured with government assistance, as the Ministry of Action for Development and Progress provided approximately $1.5 million for the college's 1981-1982 budget. During the First Liberian Civil War from 1989 to 1996, the school was looted and the structures were damaged and the campus used as a training facility for militias. From 1990 to 1997, the school operated only at an office in the U.S. state of Virginia. In 1998, the now Cuttington University College re-opened with a class of 103 students.

The college has now reopened for the third time in its history (the second founding at its current location was in 1948), after a lengthy period of civil conflict. On August 15, 2004, 117 students graduated on the war-ravaged campus in various disciplines, with the highest number of graduates being in nursing.

=== War damage ===
On February 5, 2004, the President of Cuttington, Dr. Henrique F. Tokpa met his son Captain Matthew J. Denkyan of the U.S. Army, who was assigned to Liberia as a military observer. They were part of an inspection team who toured the partially renovated facilities which had been damaged by looters during the war:

1. The Dunbar Building, which houses the office of Registrar; bookstore and a few classrooms had been de-roofed and heavy and repeated rain storms had damaged the ceiling, roofing frame and nearly all of the books that had been previously donated by the County College of Morris in Randolph, New Jersey, USA.
2. The AFRICANA Museum is in similar condition to the Dunbar Building (zinc and ceiling material have been removed by looters and the roofing timbers had been exposed to the weather and only the concrete walls and rafters remained in place.
3. The Tubman Library had sustained less structural damage, but extensive looting and on site destruction of books and facilities has taken place there.
4. The Seth C. Edwards cafeteria has been partially de-roofed and some of the roofing timbers had collapsed.
5. A grass fire had destroyed a building that had been built by the Lutheran Church as the guest house for commuting professors. The fire had created extensive cracks in the structure and will have to be demolished. The cause of the grass fire is unknown, during the dry Harmattan season grass fires are common, but due to the war they burned out of control.
6. The newly constructed Power House which was constructed with a USAID and ASHA grant is relatively intact although looters entered the building, less damage was done.The current president of the Cuttington University is Dr. Romelle Horton the institution 13th president.

== Details ==
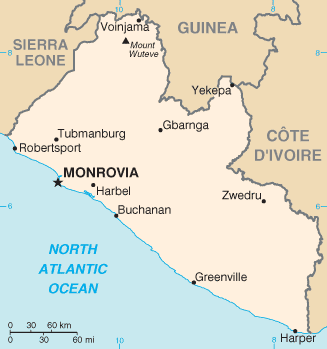
Cuttington University is located 120 miles north of Monrovia in Suacoco, Bong County

Cuttington University is the oldest private, coeducational, four-year, degree-granting institution in sub-Saharan Africa. It issues degrees in the liberal arts and a number of technical studies. It has educated generations of leaders for the nation of Liberia and West Africa. Its roots lie deep within the history of the nation, the relationship between Liberia and the United States, and the Episcopal Church.

Currently, the school is attempting to find sponsors who will help to improve its communications with the world. Since the end of the war, regular telephone, electricity, and internet services have been restored. The campus also runs its own water treatment facility. At present, a volunteer web site is maintained remotely in the United States. The Cuttington University public radio and television stations resumed broadcasts in January 2010.

The campus, 120 miles from Monrovia, includes only single-story white structures. These are set among rolling hills and cotton trees as well as rice paddies and the native tropical plants. Next to campus is the school's affiliated hospital, Phebe Hospital. Cuttington is a member of the Association of African Universities.

== Notable people ==
- Dessaline Harris, Supreme Court justice
- Roosevelt Jayjay, faculty member; Minister of Mines, GOL
- Harry Moniba, former Vice President of Liberia
- Roselyn Nugba-Ballah, Liberia's first recipient of the Florence Nightingale Medal
- James A. A. Pierre (1929), Attorney General and Chief Justice of Liberia
- Wilton Sankawulo, faculty member and author
- Jewel Taylor, Vice President of Liberia; former First Lady of Liberia
