= Truth and Reconciliation Commission (Liberia) =

Liberian governmental organization (1979–2003)

The Liberian Truth and Reconciliation Commission (TRC) is a Parliament-enacted organization created in May 2005 under the Transitional Government. The Commission worked throughout the first mandate of Ellen Johnson Sirleaf after she was elected President of Liberia in November 2005. The Liberian TRC came to a conclusion in 2010, filing a final report and recommending relevant actions by national authorities to ensure responsibility and reparations.

The Liberian TRC has garnered much criticism for its inability to address Charles Taylor and Ellen Johnson Sirleaf. The Special Court for Sierra Leone indicted Charles Taylor, the leader of the rebel group the National Patriotic Front of Liberia to which many of the crimes against humanity are attributed. This indictment prevented the Liberian TRC from hearing any testimony from Taylor. Sirleaf, on the other hand, was placed on a list of persons that should be barred from public office, a ruling which was later overturned by the Liberian Supreme Court.

== Creation and mandate ==
The Liberian TRC's mandate was to "promote national peace, security, unity and reconciliation" by investigating more than 20 years of civil conflict in the country and to report on gross human rights violations that occurred in Liberia between January 1979 and 14 October 2003. "Violations" are defined as violations of international human rights standards, crimes against humanity, war crimes, and any breaches of the Geneva Conventions.

The goal of the Liberian TRC was to dispel falsifications and misconceptions of the country's past socioeconomic and political development. The TRC also strove to provide a forum to address issues of impunity and allow victims and perpetrators of human rights violations to share their experiences, thereby creating a clear picture of the past and facilitate genuine healing and reconciliation. To this end, the Liberian TRC was granted full independence from the Liberian government, to prevent potential biases among the commissioners and other TRC employees.

The Liberian TRC was given full power to investigate gross human rights violations and systematic abuses of power in Liberia and, when possible, to identify individuals or groups that perpetrated these violations and to ensure accountability. The Liberian government took extensive measures to allow the TRC to gather information and create a thorough final report. Unlike the South African TRC, the Liberian TRC only had the ability to recommend candidates for amnesty to the Liberian government. The Liberian TRC could also make suggestions to the Liberian government regarding reparation and rehabilitation for victims; legal, institutional, or other reforms; the need for further investigation and inquiries into certain matters; and the need to hold prosecutions in particular cases.

== Commissioners ==
The government of Liberia appointed 10 members.

- Jerome J. Verdier, chairperson
- Dede Dolopei, vice chairperson
- Oumu K. Syllah, treasurer
- Bishop Arthur F. Kulah
- Sheikh Kafumba F. Konneh
- Pearl Brown Bull
- Gerald B. Coleman
- John H. T. Stewart
- Massa Washington
- Henrietta Joy Abena Mensa Bonsu

== The Final Report ==
The Final Report of the Truth and Reconciliation Commission was released on 1 July 2009. The Final Report was nearly 400 pages and included the mandate of the TRC, the methodology used in arriving at its findings, the background of the conflict in Liberia, a summary of its process of collecting information, reports of its findings, and finally its recommendations to prevent atrocities like those carried out by Charles Taylor and Prince Johnson. The Final Report took into account over 20,000 individual statements from Liberia, the United States, Nigeria, Europe, and Ghana.

The final report dealt with the problems facing post civil war Liberia in two steps. The first determination of the Liberian TRC was a list of recommendations to the Liberian government for reparations to victims of the civil wars and reforms to prevent atrocities from reoccurring, and the second was a list of names of people who required additional investigation or were found to be deserving of amnesty. The Liberian TRC made a total of 47 recommendations to the Liberian government ranging from establishing national culture centers to promote Liberia's diverse culture to ensuring that perpetrators of gross violations of human right pay reparations to victims. The TRC made suggestions to ensure that victims of the Liberian Civil Wars received appropriate compensation and that perpetrators saw some form of punishment. They additionally suggested that resources and infrastructure be made available to settle any lasting problems or conflicts. The TRC recommended no blanket amnesty, but rather asked amnesty for those under the age of 18 when fighting and those that did not break any humanitarian laws. To the government, the TRC recommended many reformations to cultural systems in place including alteration of the national motto, a reduction of the number of political parties, enhanced regulation on political appointments, and an alteration of the official Liberian calendar to include holidays from multiple ethnic groups. Broadly, the Liberian TRC propositioned that the Liberian government promote a culture of respect for human rights, ensure the protection of women and children, and decentralize the Liberian government's power.

Alongside the recommended policy changes, the TRC provided seven lists of persons or groups requiring extra investigation or deserving of amnesty. The final report listed 57 people or entities recommended for further investigation; 19 corporations, institutions, and state actors responsible for committing economic crimes; 21 individuals for committing economic crimes; 98 of the most notorious people that committed gross human rights violations; the eight leaders of the warring factions; and, lastly, a list of 50 persons recommended for sanctions. The TRC recommended that all individuals and entities noted as most notorious or requiring further investigation have a formal trial in the Liberian justice system.

Among the list of persons that should be "specifically barred from holding public offices; elected or appointed for a period of thirty (30) years" for "being associated with former warring factions" was Ellen Johnson-Sirleaf, the current president of Liberia. On 26 July, Sirleaf apologized to Liberia for supporting Charles Taylor, adding that "when the true nature of Mr. Taylor's intentions became known, there was no more impassioned critic or strong opponent to him in a democratic process" than she. On 28 August Liberia's parliament announced they must "consult our constituents for about a year" before deciding whether or not to implement the Commission's recommendations.

== Charles Taylor debate ==
Charles Taylor was a radical revolutionary in Liberia during the first Liberian Civil War and, after the death of Samuel Doe, was elected president of Liberia in 1997. During Taylor's rise to power and during his term as president, however, he carried out multiple atrocities against both the Liberian people and the people of Sierra Leone, grossly violating international humanitarian laws. After the second Liberian Civil War and Taylor's fall from power in 2003, the SCSL issued an indictment for Taylor's supposed involvement in the Sierra Leone Civil War. Through the SCSL, Charles Taylor faced trial in 2009, receiving a guilty verdict on all charges on 26 April 2012.

While Charles Taylor did face prosecution and punishment through the SCSL, many are now criticizing the Liberian TRC for not having access to hear Taylor's testimony. Without Charles Taylor's version of Liberia's Civil Wars, the rewriting of Liberia's history is arguably incomplete, leaving the Liberian people vague as to the role he actually played in the humanitarian violations in Liberia. Priscilla Hayner, the a co-founder of the International Center for Transitional Justice, established three guidelines that Truth and Reconciliation Commissions should follow to ensure due process: the accused should be notified of the allegations held against them, they should be given the opportunity to respond to the charges, and the TRC should make clear in their final report that their findings on individual responsibility do not amount to criminal guilt. Because the Liberian government handed Charles Taylor over to the SCSL, they, and the Liberian TRC, lost access to Taylor, preventing him from testifying before the TRC and preventing a full truth of the events in Liberia from being constructed.

== Impact ==
The Liberian TRC impact locally was minimal. In January 2011, the Supreme Court ruled in Williams v. Tah, a case brought by one of the people listed to be barred from public office in the TRC report. Their ruling stated that the TRC's recommendation on who should be allowed to hold office was an unconstitutional violation of the listed individuals' right to procedural due process, and that it would be unconstitutional for the government to implement the proposed bans. This decimated a large portion of the TRC's recommendations, allowing people that perpetrated or aided in gross human rights violations to remain in power in Liberia. Additionally, the other recommendations that the TRC made have not been followed, lowering the local impact to essentially none. Even though the government has not instituted the recommendations made by the TRC, 73% of Liberians had heard of the TRC and 62% believed their proposed changes should be implemented. However, only 39% of Liberians believed that the TRC actually helped promote peace and unity in Liberia.

While the Liberian TRC did not drastically alter the political situation in Liberia, it did take steps in the truth and reconciliation process that other TRCs had not taken. The TRC worked with The Advocates for Human Rights, a U.S. based organization to help promote Liberian diaspora communities in the TRC's work, the first time a TRC had gathered statements and hearings in this method. These diaspora communities allowed the TRC to gather statements from the refugees that had fled during the Liberian Civil Wars. The Liberian TRC also broke new ground in recommending prosecution of groups that committed economic crimes. These crimes ranged from tax evasion to aiding and abetting war crimes. Even though the TRC did not have its suggestions enacted by the Liberian government, the steps they took in the truth and reconciliation community will likely be taken into consideration by Truth and Reconciliation Commissions in the future.

== Criticisms ==
The Liberian TRC has faced much criticism for a variety of reasons. Critics have claimed that the TRC lacked adequate funding, competent staff, and sufficient infrastructure. The government's failure to follow through on the recommendations made by the TRC has reflected poorly on the Liberian Truth Commission's image. In 2008, Amnesty International criticized the TRC's inability to publicize its policies on reparation and prosecution, as well as the commission's policies on protection for victims, lack of general amnesty for those that provide information, and inability to provide individual reparations. The TRC also ran past its indicated period of activity, which caused the final hearings and the report to be rushed to meet the mandated deadline. This hurriedness caused a disconnect between the names recommended for prosecution or to be barred from office and their specific crimes along with a general lack of evidence to support the claims made by the TRC. The Liberian TRC's lack of power has been pointed out and further demonstrated by the Liberian government failing to enact any of their recommendations. Beyond having its recommendations ignored, the list of individuals recommended to be barred from office was found unconstitutional by the Liberian government. This ruling allowed President Sirleaf, who was recommended to be barred from office, to remain in power, garnering much international criticism.

== Sources ==
- Official Website of the TRC
- Liberia to get US abuses report
- Liberia's Truth and Reconciliation Commission: An Interim Assessment
- "Justice for Liberia". Human Rights Watch. December 10, 2009.
- We the Victims: Why Liberians Must Demand a War Crimes Tribunal For the Prosecution of Crimes Against Humanity
- Liberia's Truth and Reconciliation Commission: The Importance of Documentation in Postwar Education and Reconciliation
- Liberia: Opinion divided on Truth and Reconciliation findings
