= Temple of Justice (Liberia) =

Courthouse in Monrovia, Liberia

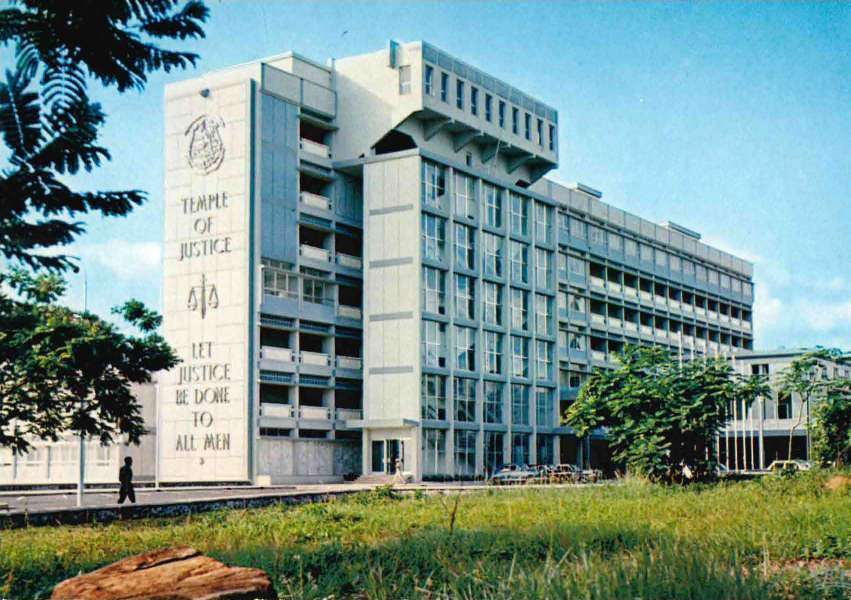
- Temple of Justice in Monrovia, before its late 2000s renovation.

General information
- Location: Monrovia; Liberia
- Coordinates: 6.3028°N 10.7969°W
- Completed: 1965
- Renovated: 2008

Design and construction
- Architect: Tommaso Valle
- Main contractor: Vianini Liberia

The Temple of Justice is a large building of modern style which was designed by Tommaso Valle in the 1960s on Capitol Hill in Monrovia, Liberia. Dedicated in 1965, it houses the Supreme Court of Liberia, auxiliary courtrooms, and legal offices. It suffered relatively little damage during the First and Second civil wars that lasted from 1989–2003, but poor maintenance and lack of electricity made the Temple unpleasant to work in.

A renovation project began in 2008; among its results was a change of the building's slogan to "LET JUSTICE BE DONE TO ALL" by removing the previous final word, "MEN".
