= Louis Arthur Grimes School of Law =

Law school of the University of Liberia

- Established: 1951
- School type: Public
- Dean: Negbalee Warner
- Location: Monrovia, Liberia
- Website: Website

Louis Arthur Grimes School of Law is the law school of the University of Liberia in Monrovia, Liberia. Founded in 1951, it is named after former Chief Justice of the Liberian Supreme Court, Louis Arthur Grimes. The school offers a three-year program leading to the granting of the Bachelor of Laws degree. Publicly supported, it is the only law school in the West African nation.

== History ==
Liberia College was founded in 1862, and the University of Liberia was created by the national legislature in 1951. In addition to the transition to a university, the legislature created the Louis Arthur Grimes School of Law and Government that same year at the university. In 1954, the law school began offering classes. Joseph Rudolph Grimes founded the school, named it after his father Louis Arthur Grimes, and served as the law school's first dean.

In 1956, Anthony Barclay succeeded Grimes as dean and remained until 1961 when the school closed after conferring a total of 21 degrees. In September of the next year the school re-opened with former Attorney General Joseph W. Garber as the dean and enrollment of 20 students. For 1963 the school employed two full-time instructors and six part-time faculty for a program that held only afternoon and evening classes. At that time the law school was housed in J. J. Roberts Hall, tuition was $27 per term, and the library contained approximately 500 volumes. The Liberian Law Journal, a law review journal, began at the school in 1965.

By 1966 the law school had grown to 49 students enrolled in either the full-time or part-time programs with a department of 13 faculty members overseeing the students and the publication of the twice yearly Liberian Law Journal. About half the professors were visiting professors, including some from the Peace Corps. The law journal temporarily stopped publication from 1970 to 1974, resumed for a few editions, and then paused again until a final publication in 1986 with a total of eight volumes printed.

Since its founding, the law school along with the university have closed on several occasions due to civil strife including in 1979, 1984, and 1990. The United Nations Mission in Liberia donated US$17,000, computers, and law text books to the law school in May 2005. In 2007, the American Bar Association paid for renovations to the law school. In April 2007, the school participated in an international moot court competition in neighboring Sierra Leone.

== Academics ==
The School of Law has a course of study that leads to the Bachelor of Laws (LL.B.) degree after three years of specialization by students at the university. Like the Juris Doctor (J.D.), the LL.B. requires the completion of an undergraduate degree, which is legal study similar to the J.D. Grimes School of Law also offers a part-time evening program that encompasses five years of study.

Courses include civil procedure, legal research and writing, criminal law, property, torts, constitutional law, contracts, evidence, along with other standard law school courses. As the only law school in Liberia, the school also offers a class on African law. Internationally, the school has a partnership with the Indiana University Maurer School of Law in the United States. Graduates are automatically admitted to the country's bar, and after three years in legal practice may apply to take a test to be admitted to the Supreme Court of Liberia's bar.

== Notable alumni ==
- Olubanke King Akerele, foreign minister
- Charles Brumskine, former President Pro Tem of the Senate
- Johnnie Lewis, Liberian Supreme Court Chief Justice
- Varney Sherman, 2005 presidential candidate
- Francis Korkpor, Sr., retired Liberian Supreme Court Chief Justice
