= University of Liberia =

National university in Liberia

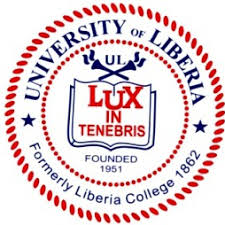
- Motto: Lux in tenebris (Latin)
- Motto in English: "Light in darkness"
- Type: Public
- Established: 1862; 164 years ago
- Affiliations: National Commission on Higher Education; Association of African Universities
- President: Layli Maparyan, Ph.D.
- Provost: Dr. William Ezra Allen
- Faculty: 331
- Students: 18,753
- Undergraduates: 26
- Postgraduates: 9
- Location: Monrovia, Liberia; 6°17′57″N 10°47′41″W
- Campus: Capitol Hill campus Fendell campus Straz-Sinje A.M Doglioti
- Colors: Red, White, Blue
- Website: www.ul.edu.lr

The University of Liberia (UL or LU in older versions of abbreviation) is a publicly funded institution of higher learning located in Monrovia, Liberia. Authorized by the national government in 1851, the university opened in 1862 as Liberia College. UL has four campuses: the Capitol Hill Campus in Monrovia, the Fendall campus in Louisiana, outside Monrovia, the Medical School Campus in Congo Town, and the Straz-Sinje Campus in Sinje Grand Cape Mount County. The university enrolls approximately 18,000 students and is one of the oldest institutions of higher learning in West Africa. It is accredited by the Liberian Commission on Higher Education.

== History ==
In 1847, Liberia declared independence from the American Colonization Society. In 1851, the new national legislature authorized the creation of a state college and chartered Liberia College. Financing was provided by the New York Colonization Society and the Trustees of Donations for Education in Liberia, both United States organizations. These two groups provided almost all of the funds for the school during the 19th century and were responsible for hiring the faculty.

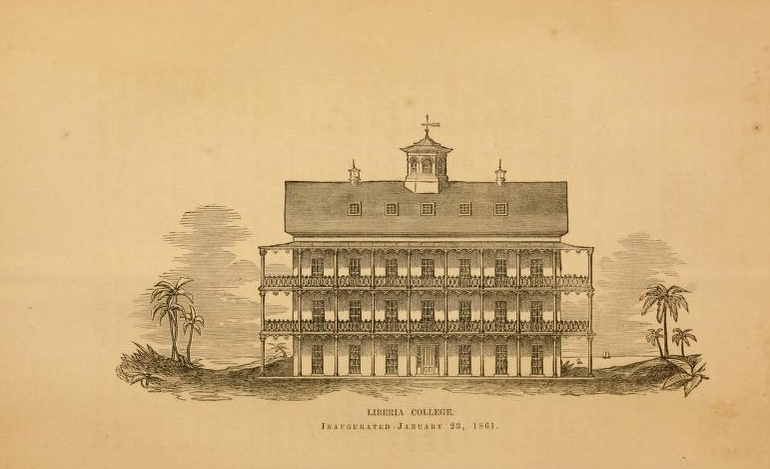
Liberia College in 1862

After authorization, groups from Clay-Ashland and Monrovia maneuvered in political circles in an attempt to have the school in their cities, with the location eventually chosen as the capital city. This political battle delayed the foundation; on 25 January 1858, the cornerstone of the first building was laid in Monrovia. In January 1862, the school was inaugurated, with classes beginning in 1863. The nation's first president, Joseph Jenkins Roberts, became the school's first president in 1862 and served in that post until 1876.

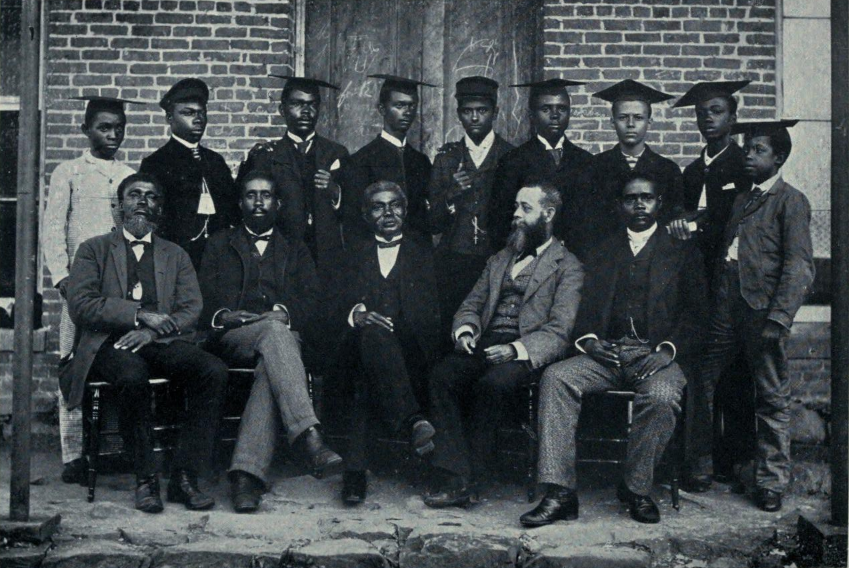
Students and faculty in 1900

Seven men made up the first class of students, with a college preparatory division adding 18 students to the enrollment two months later. Besides American financing, colleges and individuals from the United States donated books and even the bricks and lumber used to construct the school's building. The library had an estimated 4,000 volumes at opening. Once classes opened, the curriculum was the standard courses typical at American colleges with courses such as rhetoric and Latin. Part of the impetus to start the school was a concern that some Liberians were already leaving the nation to study in Great Britain, which American backers thought might lead to a move away from the republican form of government.

During the 19th century, second- and first-year students would battle each other in an annual ritual over whether the first-year students were allowed to wear trousers. From 1866 to 1902, the school had ten graduates with long periods between granting degrees. Under the leadership of Edward Wilmot Blyden, school president from 1881 to 1884, women were allowed to enroll in the preparatory department. During the 1800s, UL and the country suffered from class and caste conflicts, which led to the temporary closure of Liberia College on several occasions in the 1890s. R. B. Richardson was the first alumnus to become the school president.

=== 20th century ===
The School of Forestry at the college was founded in 1942 by Stephen A. Tolbert, who served as dean of that school until 1960. Enrollment increased at the university to approximately 70 students in 1948, and to 100 in 1950. In 1951, president J. Max Bond Sr. and dean Anna E. Cooper helped to convert the college into the University of Liberia. Also in 1951, the Law School was established and named after former Liberia Supreme Court Chief Justice Louis Arthur Grimes. In 1956, the university had an enrollment of 259 students.

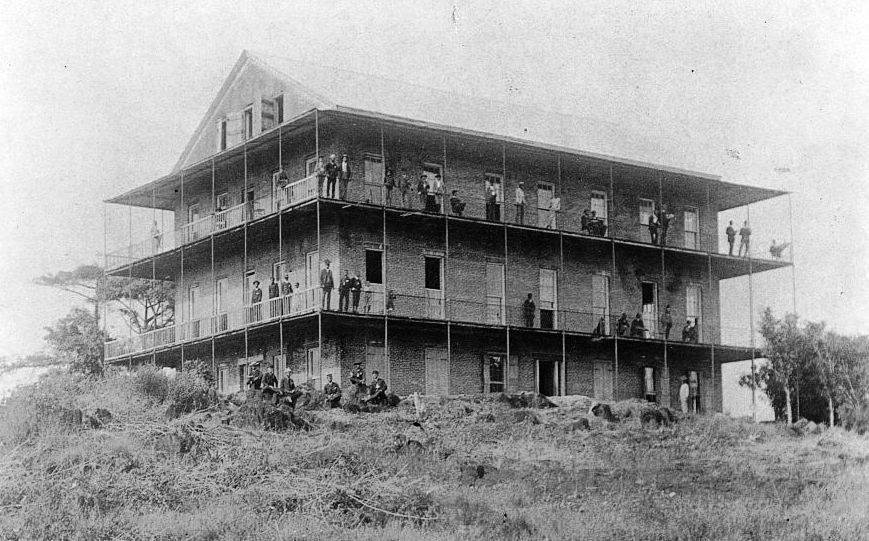
Liberia College in 1893

In 1968, a medical school was added to the university. Due to civil strife in the country, UL has closed on several occasions, including in 1979, 1984, and 1990. In one incident in 1984, students and the University of Liberia faculty protested the Liberian government's arrest of two faculty members. Liberian President Samuel K. Doe sent the Liberian Army to attack the school on 22 August 1984, leading to several deaths, more than one hundred injured, a three-month closure, and destruction of some of the facilities. It did not grant any degrees from 1989 to 1996 due to the fighting from the First Liberian Civil War. When UL re-opened in 1997, enrollment totaled 6,000 students, though the civil war had damaged university facilities and led many faculty to leave the country. The last of the strife ended with the conclusion of the Second Liberian Civil War in 2003.

=== 21st century ===
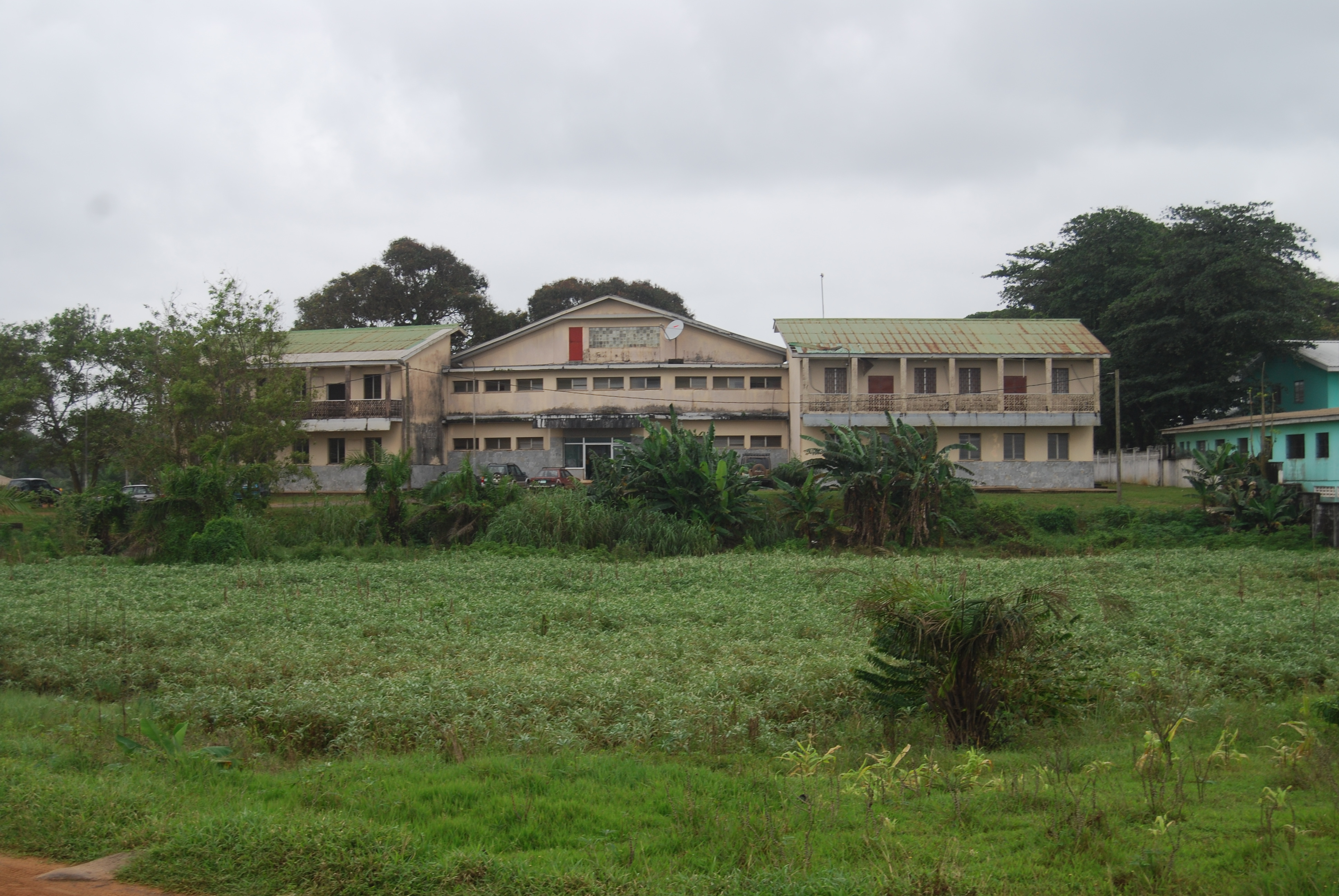
The campus in 2009

In 2007, the American Bar Association paid for renovations to the law school. In April of that year, the university opened a new 200-computer digital center paid for by a private company. In June 2007, the school's president suspended classes after a faculty strike over back wages owed by the government, with classes re-opened in July. In February 2008, U.S. President George W. Bush visited the campus during a state visit to Liberia.

China funded a US$21.5 million expansion at the Fendall Campus that began in April 2008, which added more than five buildings. In March 2009, construction began at that campus of the new Angie Brooks International Center for Women's Research, Peace and Security, named in honor of Angie Brooks, who was the first African female president of the United Nations General Assembly as well as the first female associate justice of the Supreme Court of Liberia. Emmet Dennis became the 13th president of the university that month, as enrollment topped 18,000. The Harvey S. Firestone Quadrangle Science Building at the main campus was renovated by Firestone Liberia and re-opened in November 2009.

In 2013, all 25,000 applicants failed the University of Liberia's entrance exam. The university later bowed to government pressure and gave places to 1,800 students.

== Academics ==
The university is the oldest degree-granting school in West Africa, and is accredited by Liberia's Commission on Higher Education. Classes are taught in English with the academic year running from September through August. Undergraduate students earn bachelor's degrees after four years of instruction, while the graduate programs offer master's degrees after two years of post-graduate work. Doctorates in medicine are conferred after completing a seven-year program.

As of 2019, 18,753 students were enrolled at the university in all departments, of which 12,278 are male and 6,422 are female. This made the university the largest by enrollment in Liberia. UL had 331 faculty members then. The faculty was male-dominated, with 304 men and 27 women.

The school is divided into six colleges, three graduate programs, and three professional schools. Colleges at the University of Liberia include the Liberia College of Social Sciences and Humanities, the College of Business and Public Administration, the College of General Studies, and the T. J. R. Faulkner College of Science and Technology. Additionally, there is the William V. S. Tubman Teachers College and the William R. Tolbert College of Agriculture and Forestry, both named after former presidents of the nation.

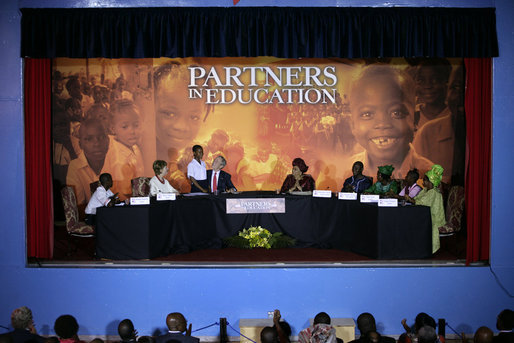
Liberian President Johnson Sirleaf and U.S. President Bush at the campus in 2008

Louis Arthur Grimes School of Law, the only law school in Liberia, was added to the university in 1951. The A. M. Dogliotti College of Medicine was opened in a partnership between Italy's A. M. Dogliotti Foundation and the government of Liberia. Students of the medical school are required to give one year of service in rural areas after graduation. The School of Pharmacy is the third professional school. At the same time, graduate programs include the Ibrahim B. Babangida Graduate Program in International Relations, the Graduate Program in Regional Science, and the Graduate Program in Education Administration.

In addition to the schools and departments of study, UL houses five institutes. These are the Institute for Research, Institute for Population Studies, Kofi A. Annan Center for Conflict Transformation, Center for Millennium Development Goals, and the Confucius Institute. The Confucius Institute teaches the Chinese language and culture and it is also in cooperation with the Changsha University of Science and Technology.

UL is a member of the Association of African Universities.

== Facilities ==
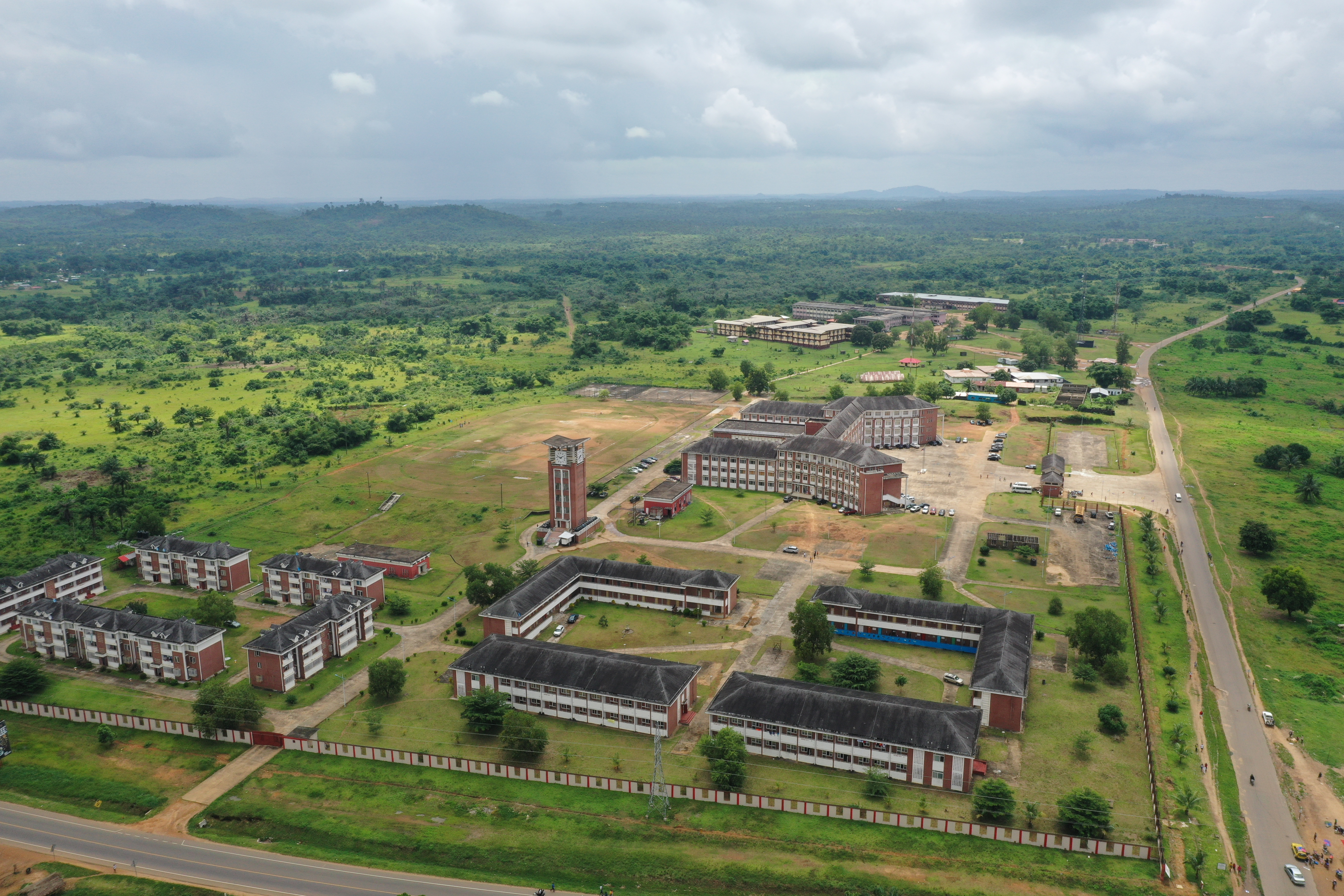
Aerial View

The publicly funded university has four campuses. The Capitol Hill Campus in downtown Monrovia, a medical campus, Straz-Sinje in Grand Cape Mount County and the Fendall campus, about 14 miles northeast of Monrovia. The College of Agriculture and Forestry is at the rural Fendell Campus. The university provides several buses to transport students between these campuses. The main campus was initially designed by Dr. J. Max Bond Sr., the former university president from 1950 to 1954.

== Notable alumni ==
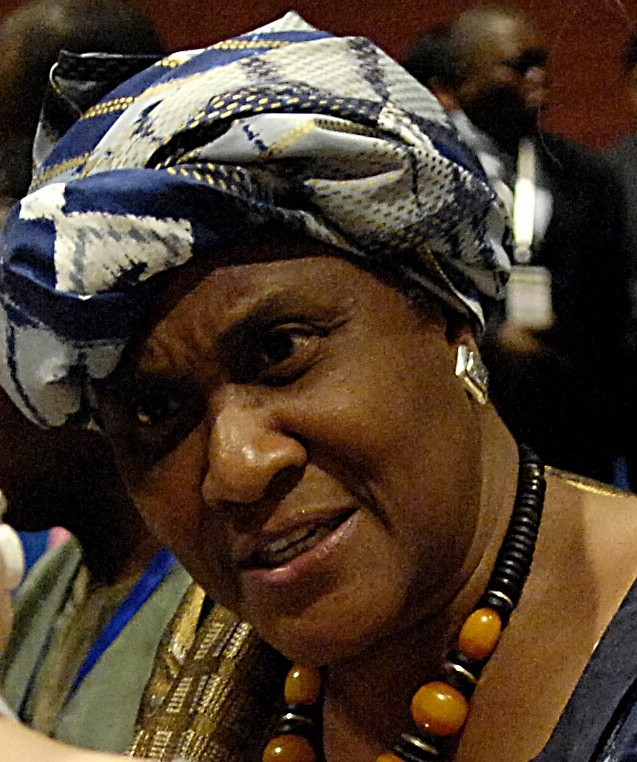
Liberian Foreign Minister Olubanke King Akerele

Alums include past and present Liberian politicians and academics. These include formal vice president of Liberia Joseph Boakai and former presidents Arthur Barclay and Joseph James Cheeseman. Candidates for the 2005 Presidential Election included UL alums Nathaniel Barnes, Varney Sherman, Togba-Nah Tipoteh, and Joseph Woah-Tee. The chairperson, Jerome Verdier, and the vice-chair, Dede Dolopei, of the Truth and Reconciliation Commission are alumni. Other alums are attorney Francis Y.S. Garlawolu, Chief Justice Johnnie Lewis, politician Charles Brumskine, Ambassador Teeko Tozay Yorlay, Foreign Minister Olubanke King Akerele, peace activist Mary Brownell, and former United States Ambassador to Liberia and founder of the Maryland Industrial and Agricultural Institute for Colored Youths, Ernest Lyon among others.

== Presidents ==
- J. Max Bond Sr. (1950–1954)
- Kermit C. King (1954–1958)
- Rocherforte L. Weeks (1957–1972)
- Advertus A. Hoff (1972–1975)
- J Bernard Blamo (1975–1978)
- Mary Antoinette Brown-Sherman (1978–1984)
- Joseph G. Morris (1984–1987)
- Stephen M. Yekeson (1988–1990)
- Patrick L. N. Seyon (1991–1996)
- Frederick S. Gbegbe (1996–1999)
- Ben A. Roberts (1999–2003)
- James N. Kollie Sr. (2004, acting)
- Al-Hassan Conteh (2004–2008)
- D. Ansu Sonii Sr. (2008, acting)
- Emmett A. Dennis (2008–2017)
- Ophelia Inez Weeks (2017–2019)
- Julius J. S. Nelson Jr. (2019–2024)
- Al-Hassan Conteh (2024–2025, acting)
- Layli Maparyan (2025–present)
