= Supreme Court of Liberia =

Highest court in Liberia

Coordinates: 6°18′8″N 10°47′50″W

- Interactive map of Supreme Court of Liberia
- Established: 1839
- Jurisdiction: Liberia
- Location: Monrovia
- Composition method: Presidential nomination with Senate confirmation
- Authorised by: Constitution of Liberia
- Judge term length: 70 years of age
- Number of positions: 5

Chief Justice of Liberia
- Currently: Sie-A-Nyene Yuoh
- Since: 27 September 2022

The Supreme Court of Liberia is the highest judicial body in Liberia. The court consists of the Chief Justice of Liberia, who is also the top judiciary official, and four associate justices, who are nominated by the President and confirmed by the Senate. The justices hold court at the Temple of Justice on Capitol Hill in Monrovia.

Article III of the Constitution of Liberia stipulates judiciary as one of the three branches of government that ought to be equal and coordinated based on the principle of checks and balances. The court was originally authorized by the 1839 Constitution of the American Colonization Society signed on 5 January 1839, while subsequent constitutions continued to authorize a supreme court, with the 1984 Constitution as the most recent version. The powers and structure of the court are determined by Article VII of the 1984 constitution. The Supreme Court is granted original jurisdiction over constitutional questions, cases in which the country is a party, and cases where ministers or ambassadors are involved by the Constitution.

The Supreme Court, as in other democratic countries, is found to be the weakest among the three arms of democracy. Trial by ordeal is prohibited by the court, but it is still practiced commonly in modern times to adjudge cases.

== Jurisdiction and structure ==
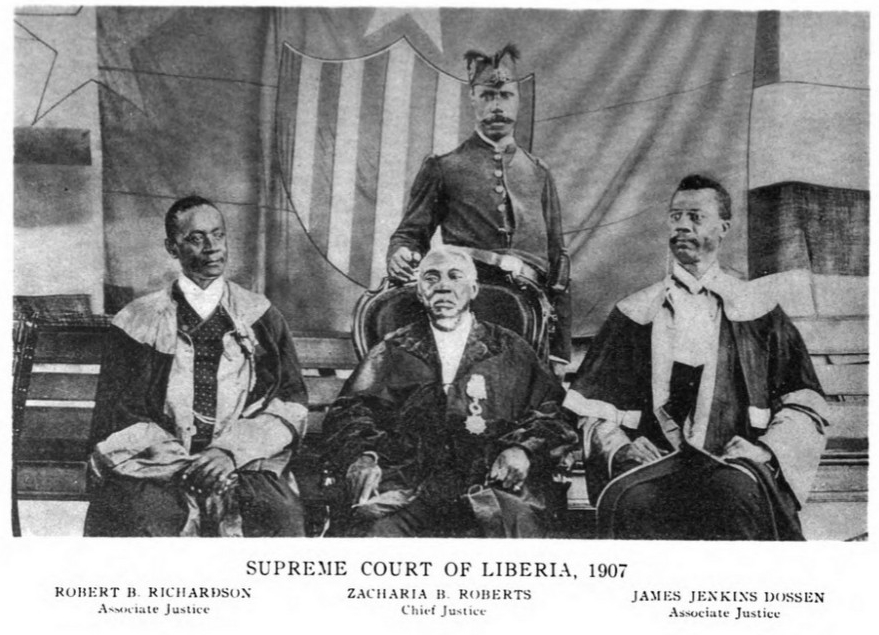
Chief Justice Zacharia B. Roberts along with his associates

Chief Justices of Liberia
Chief Justice of Liberia	Tenure
Samuel Benedict	1848–1856
John Day	1856–1861
Boston J. Drayton	1861–1864
Edward James Roye	1865–1868
Cyrus Louis Parsons	1869–1894
Zachariah B. Roberts	1895–1910
James Archibald Toliver	1911–1913
James Jenkins Dossen	1913–1924
Frederick E. R. Johnson	1924–1933
Louis Arthur Grimes	1933–1949
Martin Nemle Russell	1950–1958
Eugene Himie Shannon	1958-1958
Dash Wilson	1958–1971
James A. A. Pierre	1971–1980
Emmanuel M. Gbalazeh	1980–1986
James N. Nagbe	1986–1987
Chea Cheapoo	1987
Emmanuel M. Gbalazeh	1987–1990
James Henrique Pearson	1992
James Garretson Bull	1993–1996
Frances Johnson Morris	1997
Gloria Musu-Scott	1997–2003
Henry Reed Cooper	2003–2005
Johnnie N. Lewis	2006–2012
Francis Korkpor	2013–2022
Sie-A-Nyene Yuoh	2022–present

Article III of the Constitution of Liberia stipulates that the judiciary is one of the three branches of government that ought to be equal and coordinated based on the principle of checks and balances. The court was originally authorized by the 1839 Constitution of the American Colonization Society signed on 5 January 1839. Subsequent constitutions continued to authorize a supreme court, with the 1984 Constitution as the most recent version. Powers and structure of the court are determined by Article VII of the 1984 constitution. The Supreme Court is granted original jurisdiction over constitutional questions, cases in which the country is a party, and for cases where ministers or ambassadors are involved by the Constitution of Liberia. The court has appellate jurisdiction over other matters, with the next lowest court being the 15 Circuit Courts. The Court has five members, which is headed by the Chief Justice. The Chief Justice is appointed by the President of the country with the consent of the Senate. The Chief Justice can continue in his office up to the age of 70.

== Eligibility of Justices ==
The Chief Justice and Associate Justices of the Supreme Court of Liberia must be citizens of the country for the past ten years previous to their appointments, must be 30 years of age, counselors at law licensed to practice in the Supreme Court Bar, and engaged in the active practice of law for at least seven years prior to their appointment.

There are four Associate Justices in the supreme court and they are ranked based on their order of superiority. Any three members of the five can form a quorum and when agreement is not arrived by the quorum in any case, the President of Liberia appoints an ad-hoc judge from the circuit judges based on seniority. There are five special seats of honor in the Supreme Court chambers and the center seat is reserved for the Chief Justice. The two seats immediately adjacent to the Chief Justice are occupied by Associate judges next in rank and the corner most seats on either side for the lower ranked Associates. The seat of the judges are conferred during the appointment ceremony and the chair would remain vacant in the event of death or such extraneous situation until a new judge is appointed.

The current Associate judges of the Supreme Court are Sie-A-Nyene Yuoh, Kabineh Ja'neh, Jamesetta Howard Wolokollie and Philip A. Z. Banks, III.

== History ==
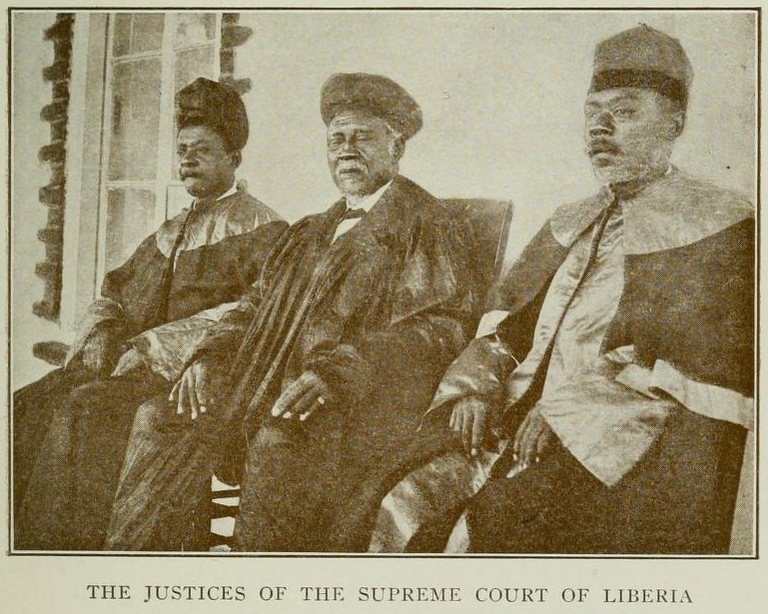
Chief Justice during 1910

In 1864 one of the most controversial legal battles was fought between two presidents, Joseph Jenkins Roberts, President of Liberia during 1848–55 against Stephen Allen Benson, another president of the country during 1856–63 over charges of land speculation. Roberts won in the lower court on account of his powers, the Supreme Court overturned the decision.

In August 2007, the Supreme Court allowed proceedings against Gyude Bryant, who was an interim President and allegedly stole $1.3 million (~$1.89 million in 2024) of government property. The Court noted he was not immune to prosecution as a head of the state as he was not elected by the people and was not abiding by the laws of the nation.

== Criticism ==
The Supreme Court, as in other democratic countries, is found to be the weakest among the three arms of democracy. Some experts quote the language in the habeas corpus that implies the judiciary is powerless against both legislature and executive.

In 2005, Liberia acceded to the Second Optional Protocol on the International Covenant on Civil and Political Rights, committing to cease capital punishment. The move was welcomed by United Nations. An amendment was made to the Penal Code in 2008, which indicates "in the event of death occurs during the commission of a crime of armed robbery, terrorism or hijacking, the accused under Section 14.54, 15.32 and 15.33 of the Act shall be sentenced to death by hanging or life imprisonment without possibility of parole". Many human rights activists and organizations see this as the reintroduction of the death penalty. The Chairman of the Law Reform clarified that the accession was during the interim government and could not be deemed valid.
