= 1981 in Liberia =

- Decades: 1960s; 1970s; 1980s; 1990s; 2000s
- See also: Other events of 1981; Timeline of Liberian history

Events in the year 1981 in Liberia.

== Incumbents ==
- Chairman of the People's Redemption Council: Samuel Doe
- Co-Chairman of the People's Redemption Council
  - Thomas Weh Syen (until August 14)
  - Nicholas Podier (after August 14)
- Chief Justice: Emmanuel Gbalazeh

== Events ==
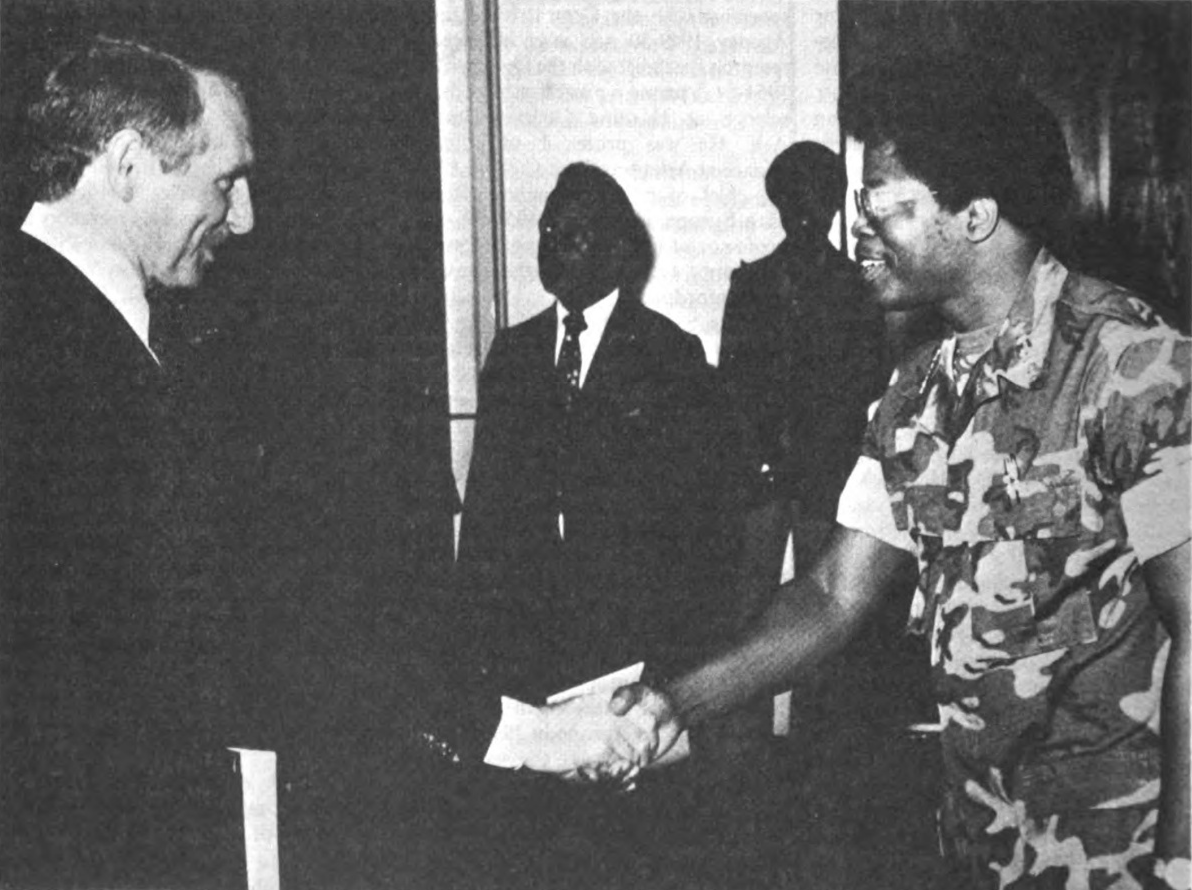
U. S. Ambassador William L. Swing presenting credentials to Chairman Samuel Doe

- April 12
  - The first National Redemption Day is celebrated, with Foreign Minister Henry Boimah Fahnbulleh giving a speech celebrating the anniversary of the 1980 coup.
  - The National Constitution Drafting Commission is formed, chaired by Amos Sawyer, with the goal of producing a new constitution.
- August 11 – United States Ambassador to Liberia William L. Swing presents his credentials to Chairman Doe.
- August 14 – Thomas Weh Syen and four other members of the People's Redemption Council are executed by firing squad for an attempted coup.
- Full date unknown
  - September – Chea Cheapoo is relieved of his position as Minister of Justice.
  - The Daily Observer begins publication.
  - Liberia expels its Libyan diplomats.
  - Liberia's first ambassador to the People's Republic of China, John Daniel Cox, retires.

== Births ==
- February 3 – Raj Panjabi, American physician and government official, in Monrovia
- December 6 – Kimmie Weeks, human rights activist

== Deaths ==
- August 14 – Thomas Weh Syen, Co-Chairman of the People's Redemption Council, executed by firing squad
