= Luvenia Ash-Thompson =

Liberian judge

Luvenia V. Ash-Thompson is a Liberian judge, academic and educator.

== Life ==
Luvenia Ash-Thompson received primary and secondary education at the Lott Carey Mission School in Brewerville, Liberia. She gained her undergraduate degree from Franklin College in Indiana in 1957, and gained a law degree from Drake University Law School in 1962. She became counsel and later probate judge in Montserrado County.

Ash-Thompson returned to Liberia in 1970, and became Assistant Professor at the Louis Arthur Grimes School of Law, University of Liberia. In 1973 she was appointed Assistant Minister of Labour. In 1974 she was one of the 51-member Deshield Commission appointed to review Liberia's national motto, flag, national anthem and constitution.

When supporters of Samuel Doe objected to the Liberian Action Party's registration in April 1985, Ash-Thompson ruled that their objections were "nothing more than a legal mischief which [...] would result in upsetting and delaying the due process of law".

In 1986 she founded a private school, the Ash-Thompson Memorial Academy. The school was destroyed three times in the civil war, and each time Ash-Thompson rebuilt it. In May 1998 she declined a nomination as chief justice of the Liberian Supreme Court in order that she might continue rebuilding the academy.

Ash-Thompson was nominated by President Taylor to serve on the Liberian Human Rights Commission, but the senate rejected her candidacy "for her preoccupation with the Louis Arthur Grimes School of Law at the University of Liberia".

In 1998 she received an honorary doctorate from Franklin College.
