= Jackson Doe =

Liberian politician (1934–1990)

- Born: 2 February 1934; Glolay, Nimba County, Liberia
- Died: c. August 1990 (aged 56)
- Occupation: Politician
- Political party: Liberian Action Party

Jackson Fiah Doe (2 February 1934 – 1990) was a Liberian politician in the late twentieth century.

== Biography ==
Doe was born in Glolay, Nimba County.

Immediately before the 1980 Liberian coup d'état, Doe served as Nimba County's senior senator, but when the government was overthrown, he lost his office, was tried for treason, and imprisoned at the Barclay Training Center. Military leader Samuel Doe (no relation) released him from prison at the end of June 1980 but forbade him to leave the country. In the country's 1985 elections, he ran for president as the candidate of the Liberian Action Party against Samuel Doe, who had been the country's head of state since the coup. According to official results, Samuel received a tiny majority of votes in the election. However, many foreign observers alleged fraud and suggested that Jackson was the true victor; according to organizations such as the BBC, Jackson had won an absolute majority of votes cast nationwide. Jackson's running mate was Emmanuel S. Kroma.

Jackson Doe went into hiding as a result of Thomas Quiwonkpa's attempted coup d'état in November 1985. Samuel Doe's government, led essentially by the People's Redemption Council of which Samuel was the chairman, claimed that the coup had been a project of the LAP, that it had been financed in large part by LAP Senator-elect Ellen Johnson Sirleaf, and that its goal was the placement of Jackson in the presidency. In June of the following year, the government arrested him on an unrelated issue. Along with Edward Kesselly of the Unity Party and Gabriel Kpolleh of the Liberia Unification Party, he was charged with leading his party into a "Grand Coalition" with the UP and the LUP to form a Grand Coalition of parties opposed to Samuel's rule. Elections officials in Samuel's government held that the coalition was not a political party and thus determined that the three party leaders had illegally campaigned on behalf of an organisation that the elections officials had not permitted to compete in the election. President Doe furthermore urged the Senate to attaint the three standard bearers, imprisoning them until 2011 and barring them from future involvement in politics.

Doe died during the First Liberian Civil War; according to some sources, he was killed by NPFL soldiers, apparently in August 1990.

In 2004, Sirleaf – by then the president of the country – credited his death as one of the most prominent events that induced her to abandon her former membership in the National Patriotic Front of Liberia. In 2011, his memory was honored by the government, which named a new Nimba County hospital for him. He is unrelated to Samuel Doe, and thus also unrelated to Samuel's brother Jackson E. Doe, who was once the Minister of Transport in the administration of President Sirleaf.
