= 1980 in Liberia =

- Decades: 1960s; 1970s; 1980s; 1990s; 2000s
- See also: Other events of 1980; Timeline of Liberian history

Events in the year 1980 in Liberia.

== Incumbents ==
- President
  - William Tolbert (until April 12)
  - Samuel Doe (from April 14, as Chairman of the People's Redemption Council)
- Vice President
  - Bennie Dee Warner (until April 12)
  - Thomas Weh Syen (from April 14, as Co-Chairman of the People's Redemption Council)
- Chief Justice
  - James A. A. Pierre (until April 12)
  - Emmanuel Gbalazeh (after April 14)

== Events ==
- January 8 – The Progressive People's Party is registered.
- March 10 – George Boley is arrested on charges of treason and sedition.
- March 28 – The oppositional Progressive People's Party is banned by an act of the Legislature of Liberia.
- March 31 – Liberia establishes diplomatic ties with Ecuador.
- April 12 – 1980 Liberian coup d'état
  - President William Tolbert is assassinated following an attack led by seventeen members of the Armed Forces of Liberia on the Executive Mansion.
  - The Liberian Constitution of 1847 is suspended.
  - George Boley is released from prison.
- April 14 – The People's Redemption Council is established, with Samuel Doe as its chairman and head of state of Liberia.
- April 22 – The Doe regime executes five of President Tolbert's cabinet ministers and eight former Liberian officials by firing squad.
- April 30 – Former Vice President Bennie Dee Warner announces the formation of a government-in-exile in Ivory Coast with the intention of overthrowing the Doe regime.
- August 26 – Doe leaves to visit Addis Ababa, Ethiopia in his first international visit since his taking power.
- Full date unknown
  - Matilda Newport Day is abolished.
  - Liberia establishes formal diplomatic relations with Libya.

== Births ==
- May 22 – Eddie Watson, Liberian-born Ghanaian actor

== Deaths ==
- April 12 – William Tolbert, President of Liberia, in Monrovia (b. 1913)
- April 22 – Thirteen officials executed by the Doe Regime, including:
  - Cyril Bright, former Minister of Planning and Economic Affairs
  - Joseph J. Chesson, Minister of Justice
  - Cecil Dennis, Secretary of State (b. 1931)
  - Richard A. Henries, Speaker of the House of Representatives (b. 1908)
  - Charles T. O. King, Deputy Minister for Agriculture
  - David Franklin Neal, former Minister of Planning and Economic Affairs
  - P. Clarence Parker II, Chairman of the National Investment Council and Treasurer of the True Whig Party
  - James T. Phillips, former Minister of Finance and former Minister of Agriculture
  - James A. A. Pierre, Chief Justice of the Supreme Court (b. 1908)
  - John W. Sherman, Assistant Minister of Commerce and Trade
  - Frank J. Stewart Sr., Director of the Budget
  - Frank E. Tolbert, President Pro-Tempore of the Senate (b. 1910)
  - E. Reginald Townsend, Chairman of the True Whig Party (b. 1917)
- November 10 – Momolu Dukuly, former Secretary of State, in Monrovia (b. 1903)
