= 1985 Liberian general election =

- 15 October 1985
- Presidential election
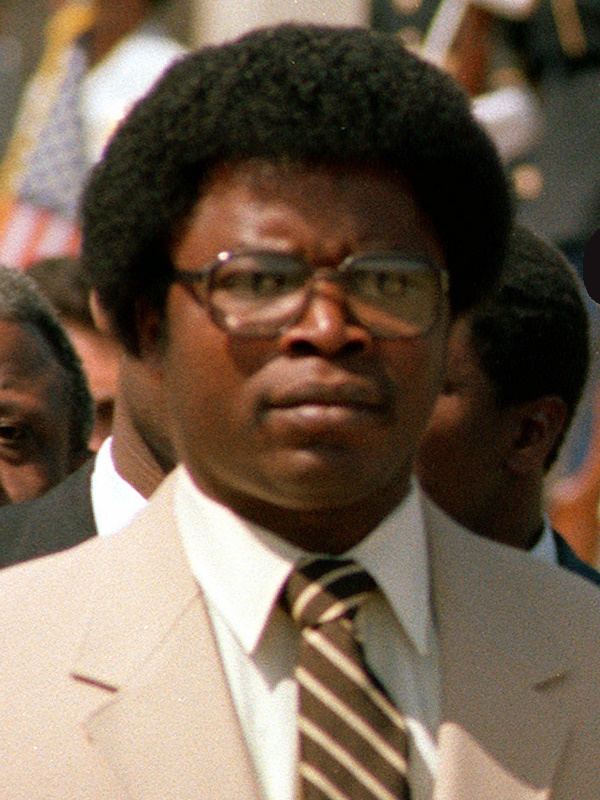

| Nominee | Samuel Doe | Jackson Doe |
| Party | NDPL | LAP |
| Running mate | Harry Moniba | Emmanuel Koroma |
| Popular vote | 264,362 | 137,270 |
| Percentage | 50.95% | 26.46% |
- Results by county
President before election
Samuel Doe
NDPL
Elected President
Samuel Doe
NDPL

General elections were held in Liberia on 15 October 1985. They were the first elections since the 12 April 1980 military coup that brought Samuel Doe to power. During 1984, a new draft constitution was approved in a referendum, which provided for a 58-member civilian and military Interim National Assembly, headed by Samuel Doe as president. After a ban on political parties was lifted, four parties – Doe's National Democratic Party (NDP), the Liberian Action Party, the Unity Party and the Liberia Unification Party – contested the elections.

Polling was marred by allegations of widespread fraud and rigging. Official results showed that Samuel Doe won the presidential election with 50.9% of the vote, just enough to avoid a runoff. His NDP won large majorities in both houses of the Legislature. Many independent observers believed that the Liberian Action Party's Jackson Doe, who officially finished second, was the actual winner. It was later revealed that Samuel Doe had the ballots counted in a secret location by his handpicked staff. The period after the elections saw increased human rights abuses, corruption, and ethnic tensions, ultimately leading to the start of the First Liberian Civil War in 1989 and Doe's overthrow and murder in 1990.

== Background ==
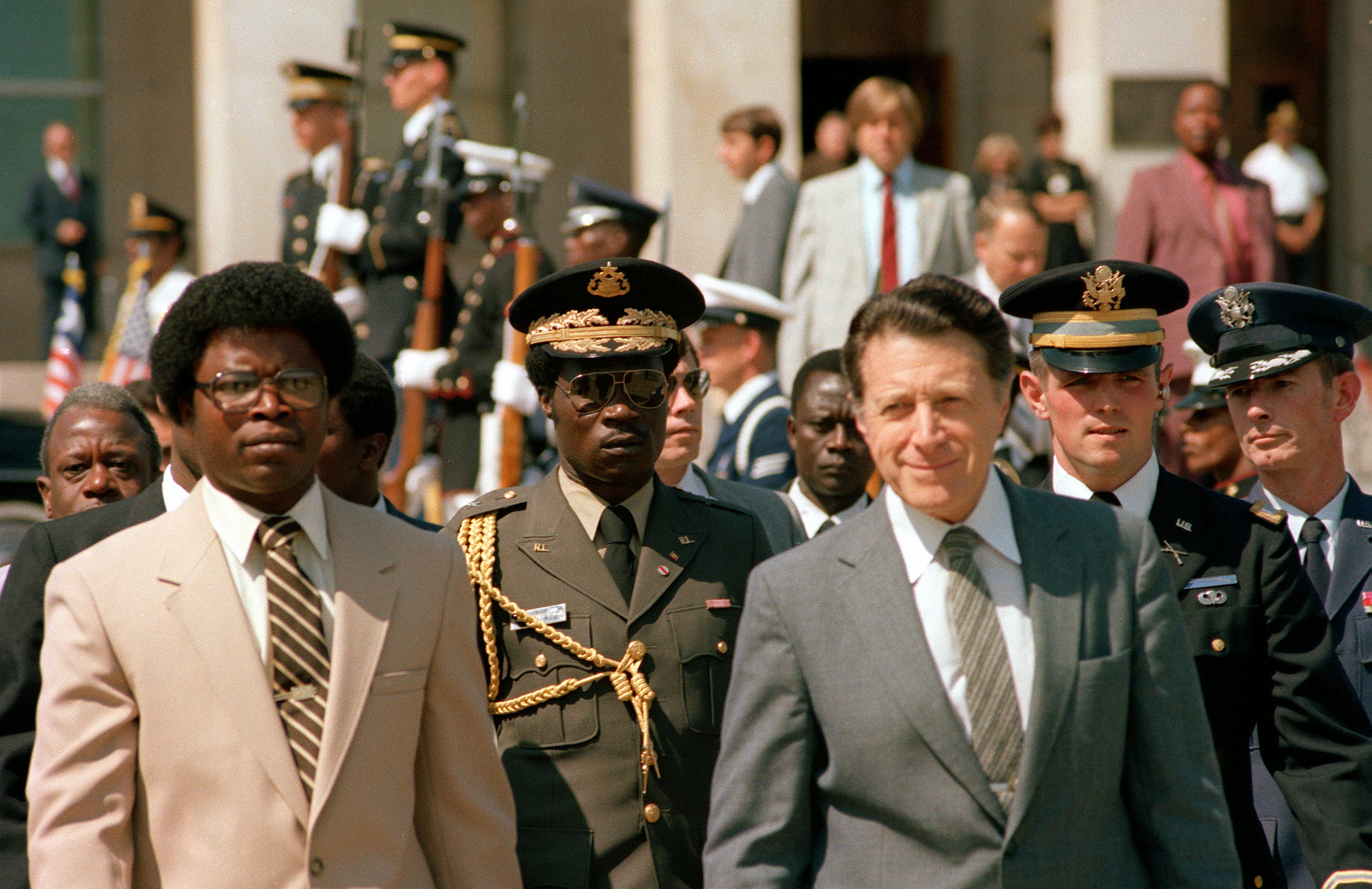
US Secretary of Defense Caspar W. Weinberger with Samuel Doe outside the Pentagon's River entrance.

The True Whig Party, founded in 1869, was one of the oldest political parties in the world and the oldest in Africa. In power from 1877, the party was mostly composed of Americo-Liberians, who constituted less than one per cent of the population in the census of 1962. President William Tubman ruled from 1947 until his death in 1971 and William Tolbert continued afterwards, winning the 1975 elections. However, in 1980 he was overthrown in a coup; Master Sergeant led a group of conspirators and removed Tolbert from office on 12 April 1980. According to his account, the group wanted to arrest Tolbert and when he resisted, he was shot dead. A counter-insurgency operation on 16 April was put down and Samuel Doe gained full control of the government. Doe's military People Redemption Council (PRC) invoked martial law and took control of all legislative and executive powers. This led to numerous executions, rampant corruption, increasing rates of unemployment and decreasing health conditions. At the UN General council, the new government announced that elections would be possibly held by 1983. Samuel Doe also built his image internationally by having border issues fixed with neighbouring countries and also promised a fair trial to the family of Tolbert.

During 1984, a new draft constitutional was approved in a referendum, which provided for a 58-member civilian and military Interim National Assembly, headed by Samuel Doe as president.

== Electoral system ==
The bicameral Legislature consisted of a 26-member Senate and a 64-member House of Representatives. Each of the 13 counties elected two senators and at least two Representatives. Senators served a nine-year term and were elected by first-past-the-post voting. Representatives were elected from single-member districts, also by first-past-the-post voting.

The voting age was 18. Persons of foreign origin, declared insane or and convicted of crimes were not eligible. Candidates for the House of Representatives were required to have been resident in the country for one year before the elections, be a taxpayer and be at least 25 years old. Senate candidates had to be at least 30.

== Campaign ==
After the ban on political parties was lifted, four parties, namely, Doe's National Democratic Party of Liberia, the Liberian Action Party, the Unity Party and the Liberia Unification Party contested the elections.

== Conduct ==
Polling was largely peaceful, but marred by allegations of widespread fraud and rigging. Many independent observers believed that the Liberian Action Party's Jackson Doe, who officially finished second, was the actual winner. It was later revealed that Samuel Doe had the ballots counted in a secret location by his handpicked staff. Though there was no official mission from the United States to validate the fair conduct of the elections, the American Assistant Secretary of State Chester A. Crocker acknowledged that there were widespread irregularities, but pointed out that the narrow margin of victory showed good amount of fair polling and the extended hours of voting proved effective in increasing the voter turnaround. He also pointed out that radio stations and newspapers provided fair coverage to all the four parties that competed.

== Results ==
| Party | Presidential candidate | Votes | % | Seats | |
| Party | Presidential candidate | Votes | % | House | Senate |
|---|---|---|---|---|---|
| National Democratic Party | Samuel Doe | 264,364 | 50.95 | 51 | 22 |
| Liberian Action Party | Jackson Doe | 137,270 | 26.46 | 8 | 2 |
| Liberia Unification Party | Gabriel Kpolleh | 59,965 | 11.56 | 3 | 1 |
| Unity Party | Edward Kesselly | 57,273 | 11.04 | 2 | 1 |
| Total | | 518,872 | 100.00 | 64 | 26 |
| Registered voters/turnout | | 977,862 | – | | |
Source: Nohlen et al.

== Aftermath ==
Samuel Doe was sworn in as the President on 6 January and a civilian cabinet on 15 January. The period after the elections saw increased human rights abuses, corruption, and ethnic tensions, ultimately leading to the start of the First Liberian Civil War in 1989 and Doe's overthrow and murder in 1990.
