= Peter Naigow =

Liberian politician

Peter Lorkulah Naigow (1942–14 November 2011) was a Liberian politician.

He was born in 1942 in Totota, Bong County. He got a journalism degree from the University of Wisconsin–Madison, and worked as a radio broadcaster. He was a member of the special investigative committee on reform at the end of the Tolbert administration. He served as assistant minister of information from 1977 to 1980, minister of labour and in other positions in Samuel Doe's administration.

He was elected as Vice President on 19 April 1991 to the interim administration of Amos Sawyer. He resigned on 15 August 1991, after a falling out with Prince Johnson when the INPFL left the interim government. He was one of vice presidential candidates in the 1997 presidential elections.
