= Momolu Sirleaf =

Liberian politician

Momolu V. Sackor Sirleaf was a Liberian politician. During the First Liberian Civil War, he represented the National Patriotic Front of Liberia internationally. He served as foreign minister of the National Patriotic Reconstruction Assembly Government of Charles Taylor in 1993. He represented the NPFL in the 1993 Geneva talks that followed the Harper massacre.

As warring factions agreed to form a National Transitional Government in 1995, Sirleaf was named foreign minister.

After Charles Taylor was elected President of Liberia in 1997, Sirleaf was again named foreign minister. He was succeeded later the same year by Monie R. Captan.
