= Roland Diggs =

Liberian politician

Roland J. Diggs (1934–2019) was a Liberian Lutheran bishop.

He was born on 11 September 1934. He was elected as Vice President in August 1990 to the interim administration of Amos Sawyer. He stepped down to concentrate on religious issues and was succeeded in April 1991 by Peter Naigow.

He died on 1 March 2019 in Lawrenceville, Georgia, USA.
