= List of ambassadors of Liberia to China =

Coordinates: 39.960856°N 116.433778°E

Ambassador of Liberia to China
- Inaugural holder: Joseph Rudolph Grimes
- Formation: May 18, 1966

The Liberian ambassador in Beijing is the official representative of the Government in Monrovia to the Government of the People's Republic of China.

- The governments in Taipei and Monrovia recognized each other in the periods of 1957 to 1977, 1989 to 1993 and 1997 to 2003.

== List of representatives ==
Diplomatic agrément/Diplomatic accreditation	ambassador	Observations	President of Liberia	Premier of the Republic of China	Term end
May 18, 1966	Joseph Rudolph Grimes		William Tubman	Yen Chia-kan	
September 1, 1974	Ernest Eastman		William R. Tolbert Jr.	Chiang Ching-kuo	October 1, 1975

Diplomatic agrément/Diplomatic accreditation	ambassador	Observations	President of Liberia	Premier of the People's Republic of China	Term end
February 17, 1977		the governments of Beijing and Monrovia took up diplomatic relations	William R. Tolbert Jr.	Hua Guofeng	
May 4, 1978	John Daniel Cox		William R. Tolbert Jr.	Hua Guofeng	1981
1981	George Toe Washington		Samuel Doe	Zhao Ziyang	1983
1984	John Christopher Ricks		Samuel Doe	Zhao Ziyang	April 1, 1988

Diplomatic agrément/Diplomatic accreditation	ambassador	Observations	President of Liberia	Premier of the Republic of China	Term end
October 9, 1989		the governments of Taipei and Monrovia took up diplomatic relations	Samuel Doe	Lee Huan	January 1, 1993
January 1, 1993			Amos Sawyer	Lien Chan	
July 25, 1995			Amos Sawyer	Li Peng	
January 1, 1997		9 September 1997: the government in Beijing severs diplomatic relations with Liberia after the latter recognizes Taiwan.	Ruth Perry	Vincent Siew	
February 1997	John Cummings (Liberian diplomat)	Ruth Perry has stressed that this position remains unchanged, but in early February Charles Taylor (Liberian politician) sent his own envoy, John Cummings, as "ambassador" to Taiwan. During his visit, Mr Taylor pledged to re-establish diplomatic relations with Taipei.	Ruth Perry	Tang Fei	October 2003
January 1, 2003			Charles Taylor (Liberian politician)	Yu Shyi-kun	

Diplomatic agrément/Diplomatic accreditation	ambassador	Observations	President of Liberia	Premier of the People's Republic of China	Term end
July 27, 2005	Neh Rita Sangai Dukuly Tolbert	held ambassadorships to France, UNESCO, Switzerland, Luxembourg and Spain.	Gyude Bryant	Wen Jiabao	November 26, 2010
July 26, 2013	Jarjar Massaquoi Kamara	31.07.2014 - he takes up his new assignment in Beijing. He succeeds His Excellency. Jarjar Kamara, who now serves as Ambassador at-interim in Brussels,	Ellen Johnson Sirleaf	Li Keqiang	June 25, 2014
June 25, 2014	Dudley McKinley Thomas	2001 he was ambassador in Bern, 2009 he was ambassador in Paris.	Ellen Johnson Sirleaf	Li Keqiang	January 2018
