= Greater Liberia =

Territory controlled by the National Patriotic Front of Liberia

- 1989–1997
- Flag and the logo of the NPFL used by the government Coat of arms
- Status: Quasi-state (with a rival government from 1991 until 1994)
- Capital: Gborplay (base of the NPFL; 1989–1990); Gbarnga (1990–1997)
- President
  - 1989–1997: Charles Taylor
- Establishment: First Liberian Civil War
- History
  - Established (First Liberian Civil War begins): 24 December 1989
  - Disestablished (Charles Taylor becomes President of Liberia): 2 August 1997
Preceded by	Succeeded by
Republic of Liberia	Republic of Liberia

Greater Liberia or Taylorland referred to areas controlled by the National Patriotic Front of Liberia, due its state-like structures it was considered to be a quasi-state in Liberia, which existed from 1989 until 1997. They claimed to be the real Republic of Liberia, the government that they later established was called "National Patriotic Reconstruction Assembly Government" "(NPRAG)". During its territorial peak, it controlled 90% of Liberia, in mid 1996, they again controlled almost all of Liberia.

== History ==
The first territory they captured was the border town of Butuo, which they took over on 24 December 1989. Over the course of the First Liberian Civil War, the Liberian central government effectively collapsed, allowing warlords to establish their own fiefs. One of the most powerful rebel leaders in Liberia, Charles Taylor, set up his own domain in a way resembling an actual state: He reorganised his militia into a military-like organisation (split into Army, Marines, Navy, and Executive Mansion Guard), established his de facto capital at, Gbarnga which they captured in May 1990 along Buchanan. In June 1990, besieged Monrovia. Afterwards, Taylor created a civilian government, the NPRAG, alongside a justice system under his control to enforce law and order. The area under his control became relatively stable and peaceful until it largely disintegrated in 1994/5 as a result of attacks by rival militias. In the end, however, Taylor won the civil war and was elected President of Liberia, with his regime becoming the new central government.

== Government ==
The National Patriotic Reconstruction Assembly Government (NPRAG) was a self-declared, alternative administration established in early 1991 in areas held by the rebel National Patriotic Front of Liberia (NPFL) during the country's civil war. It was formed in opposition to the internationally recognized Interim Government of National Unity (IGNU) led by Amos Sawyer. The NPRAG was based in the Bong County town of Gbarnga. NPFL leader Charles Taylor declared himself head of the NPRAG, but this led to a dispute that eventually split the rebel group. Both the NPRAG and IGNU ceased to exist in 1994; however, Greater Liberia didn't cease to exist.

=== Economy ===
Greater Liberia boasted its own currency and banking system, television and radio network, airfields and, until 1993, a deepwater port. Taylor's associates still preside over an export trade in diamonds, timber, gold and agricultural products.

=== Ministers ===
- Minister of Finance:
  Willian E. Donnle Jr
- Minister of Agriculture:
  Dr. Roland C. Massaquoi

== See also ==
- Liberated Zone (Sierra Leone)
- First Liberian Civil War
- Second Liberian Civil War
- National Patriotic Front of Liberia
- Moses Blah
