= Constitution of Liberia =

Supreme law of the Republic of Liberia

The Constitution of Liberia is the supreme law of the Republic of Liberia. The current constitution, which came into force on 6 January 1986, replaced the Liberian Constitution of 1847, which had been in force since the independence of Liberia. Much like the 1847 Constitution, the Constitution creates a system of government heavily modeled on the Federal Government of the United States.

== Drafting process ==
Following the overthrow and execution of President William Tolbert by a small group of soldiers led by Samuel Doe on April 12, 1980, the 1847 Constitution was suspended and governing power was assumed by the People's Redemption Council led by Doe. Doe refused to assume the presidency, instead ruling by decree as the Chairman of the PRC.

On April 12, 1981, Amos Sawyer, a political science professor at the University of Liberia, was appointed Chairman of the National Constitution Committee, a 25-member body tasked with drafting a new constitution. In December 1982, the Committee finished their draft constitution, and submitted it to the People's Redemption Council in March 1983.

The PRC appointed a 59-member Constitutional Advisory Committee to review the draft. On October 19, 1983, the CAA finished its review, having removed or altered several provisions. Among the changes made to the draft included an increase of presidential terms from four to six years, removal of an entrenchment provision that would have prevented amendments altering presidential term lengths and term limits, removal of a prohibition on government participation by military personnel, and deletion of provisions establishing two autonomous agencies charged with approving judicial candidates and investigating corruption.

On July 3, 1984, the revised Constitution was submitted to a national referendum, where it was approved by 78.3% of voters. Following the 1985 general election, the new Constitution came into effect on January 6, 1986, with the inauguration of Doe and the newly elected Legislature of Liberia.

== Constitutional institutions ==
=== Presidency ===
The executive power of the state is vested in the President of Liberia, who is entrusted to faithfully execute the laws of the country. Among the changes made to the presidency from the previous constitution include the introduction of term limits, prohibiting the President from serving more than two terms, and the reduction of presidential terms from eight years to six.

Additionally, the Constitution also requires that candidates for the presidency must own at least $25,000 in real property, an increase in the original $600 requirement in the 1847 Constitution. Furthermore, the President is immune from civil suits arising from actions taken during their tenure in office and arrest on criminal charges while in office, though the President may be prosecuted for criminal acts committed while in office upon vacating the presidency.

The Constitution also includes new provisions allowing for the presidential appointment of a new Vice President, with the consent of both houses of the Legislature, in the event of the vacancy of the office. Furthermore, the Constitution provides that in the event of the assumption of the presidency by the Vice President in the event of the President's death, resignation, incapacity or removal, the Vice President will be not considered to have served a term in office for the purpose of term limits.

=== Legislature ===
The Constitution grants legislative power to the Legislature of Liberia. Few changes were made to the Legislature from the 1847 Constitution, which largely modeled the Liberian Congress on the United States Congress. However, due to the unitary nature of Liberia, the Legislature is not restricted in its power to make laws, so long as those laws do not violate any provision of the Constitution.

=== Judiciary ===
The Constitution largely follows the model set by Article IV of the 1847 Constitution, vesting judicial powers in the Supreme Court of Liberia and any subordinate courts created by the Legislature. However, the Constitution places previously absent requirements on judicial appointees, requiring Supreme Court justices to have been counselors of the Supreme Court Bar for at least five years and requiring all other judges to have been either practicing attorneys for three years or a member of the Supreme Court Bar.

=== Autonomous agencies ===
Article 89 of the Constitution mandates the establishment of three independent agencies:

- Civil Service Commission
- National Election Commission
- General Auditing Commission

== Additional provisions ==
While the 1847 Constitution had provided for political rights similar to those expressed in the United States Bill of Rights, the current constitution expands these rights to include a variety of economic and social rights. For instance, Article 6 provides for equal access to education, while Article 5 protects traditional Liberian culture.

Article 8 establishes workers' rights by prohibiting inhumane or dangerous working conditions, and Article 18 prohibits employment discrimination on the basis of gender, religion or ethnicity, as well as guaranteeing equal pay. Additionally, Article 14 explicitly invokes the separation of church and state and the prohibition of a state religion.

Article 27(b) of the Constitution retains the controversial nationality requirements of Article V, Section 13 of the 1847 Constitution, which limits citizenship to "persons who are Negroes or of Negro descent."

Article 95(a) of the Constitution officially repeals the 1847 Constitution, while certifying that all laws enacted before the repeal remain in effect. Article 95(a), (b) and (c) also certifies the validity of all statutes, treaties, international agreements and financial obligations enacted by the People's Redemption Council. Additionally, Article 97 prohibits any court from questioning the validity of actions taken by the PRC or bringing charges against any PRC member for the overthrow of the Tolbert administration, the repeal of the 1847 Constitution, the establishment of the PRC, the imposition of criminal penalties or the confiscation of property by the PRC during their term in power or the establishment of the new constitution.

== Amendment process ==
Per Article 91, constitutional amendments may be proposed by either a two-thirds vote of both houses of the Legislature, or by a petition signed by at least 10,000 registered voters and approved by a two-thirds vote in the Legislature. A proposed amendment must be ratified by two-thirds of voters in a popular referendum held no sooner than one year after its approval by the Legislature.

Article 93 affirms that while the term limitations set forth in Article 50 may be amended, the term limitations of the President in office at the time of ratification of such an amendment remain in place.

== 2011 amendment referendum ==
On 17 August 2010, the Legislature passed four amendments to the Constitution. The four amendments proposed would have:

- Decreased the residency requirement for presidential and vice presidential candidates in Article 52 from ten to five years;
- Increased the mandated retirement of judges from 70 to 75;
- Changed the date of national elections set in Article 83 from the second Tuesday in October to the second Tuesday in November;
- Allowed House and Senate elections to use first-past-the-post voting, while retaining the two-round system for presidential elections.

In a referendum held on 23 August 2011, all four amendments failed to garner the required two-thirds majority for approval.

== Past constitutions ==
Before the adoption of the current constitution, Liberia was governed by its original constitution, ratified prior to its independence in 1847:

- Liberian Constitution of 1847

Additionally, Liberia was governed by two constitutions during the rule by the American Colonization Society under the Commonwealth of Liberia:

- Liberian Constitution of 1820
- Liberian Constitution of 1838
