= Liberian Action Party =

Political party in Liberia

The Liberian Action Party (LAP) was a political party in Liberia.

In the country's 1985 elections, LAP candidate Jackson Doe was the leading challenger to incumbent Head of State Samuel Doe. Official results showed that Samuel received a narrow majority of votes cast in the election, although outside observers alleged widespread fraud; according to organizations such as the BBC, Jackson had won an absolute majority of votes cast nationwide.

In the 19 July 1997 legislative elections, the party was part of the Alliance of Political Parties, which won 2 out of 64 seats in the House of Representatives. While international observers deemed the polls administratively free and transparent, they noted that it had taken place in an atmosphere of intimidation because most voters believed that former rebel leader and National Patriotic Party (NPP) candidate Charles Taylor would return to war if defeated.

The party fielded candidates in the 11 October 2005 elections as part of the four-party Coalition for the Transformation of Liberia (COTOL).

Ellen Johnson Sirleaf was formerly a prominent party member and Jackson Doe's running mate in 1985, but defected to the Unity Party in the run-up to the 1997 elections. On 1 April 2009, the Liberian Action Party and the Liberia Unification Party merged into the ruling Unity Party.
