= Thomas Weh Syen =

Liberian politician

- Born: 1951/1952; Liberia
- Died: August 15, 1981; Monrovia, Liberia
- Cause of death: Execution by firing squad
- Political party: People's Redemption Council

Thomas Weh Syen (died August 15, 1981) was a Liberian soldier and politician. He was a leading member of the group of enlisted men that overthrew the country's government in an April 1980 military coup d'état, and accordingly, he became one of the leaders of the new military junta, the People's Redemption Council. In the wake of the coup d'état, he took the title of major general in the Armed Forces of Liberia and became the co-chairman of the PRC; as a result, he was the immediate deputy of Commander-in-Chief Samuel Doe and the Vice Head of State.

From the earliest days of the PRC, Doe and Syen clashed; testimony before the Truth and Reconciliation Commission in 2008 revealed that their disagreements began during the coup itself when Weh Syen and Doe forcibly disagreed about the disposal of money that had been stolen from the home of the newly murdered President William R. Tolbert Jr. While a member of the PRC, he was partly responsible for educational affairs, but his time on the Council was short-lived.

Maj. Gen. Thomas Weh-Syen, an outspoken critic of some of Doe's policies, including the closure last spring of Libya's diplomatic mission and the forced reduction of the Soviet Embassy staff from 15 to six. After allegedly attempting to kill Doe in a second coup financed by Muammar Al-Gaddafi. Weh Syen was tried in a court-martial at the Temple of Justice in Monrovia. Weh-Syen and the other imprisoned party members were brought to the yard.

Weh Syen and five were charged with murder and a backlash plot against the Doe government, but no evidence of conspiracy was publicly presented during their hasty three-day military trial. As they were led past crowds gathered outside the Temple of Justice, where the trials were held, the men exhibited confidence that they would be acquitted. Weh-Syen was jeered by the crowds when he declared he had "never plotted to kill Doe." He later told reporters to "tell the world" that "if I die, I die for nothing." They were found guilty and executed by firing squad in what was seen as the climactic end to a power struggle among the 17 soldiers who took control of the government in a bloody coup last year. The men executed were also known to have criticized what they perceived as the Doe government's "errand boy" relationship with the United States. Besides Weh-Syen, 29, they were Lt. Col. Nelson Toe, at 22 the youngest member of the council; Lt. Col. Harry Johnson, 30; Maj. Henry Zuo, 28, and Lt. Col. Robert Sumo. The five formed the core of the left-leaning resistance to many of the pro-Western decisions taken by Liberia's military head of state, Master Sgt. Samuel K. Doe. All were members of the original group of 17 noncommissioned officers and privates who overthrew the government of William R. Tolbert on April 12, 1980, ending a century and a half of dominance in the country by Americo-Liberians—the descendants of American blacks who founded Liberia in the early 19th century.

The speed and secrecy of the trial left fear in Monrovia. Liberians who felt safe openly discussing their disagreements with the Doe administration now do so only privately in secluded places.

He was replaced as Vice Head of State by PRC Speaker J. Nicholas Podier.

He was the father of a son, Thomas Weh Syen Jr., who died soon after his father — on 24 December 1981, the 5½-year-old boy was hit by a car while he was crossing a street near his home.
