= Olmstead Luca =

Composer of the Liberian national anthem (1826–1869)

"All Hail, Liberia, Hail!" (instrumental)
Olmstead Luca's music for "All Hail, Liberia, Hail!" performed by the United States Navy Band

Olmstead Luca (1826 – March 27, 1869), also known as Cleveland Luca, was a pianist and composer who lived in Liberia. Born in the United States, he composed the music for the Liberian national anthem, "All Hail, Liberia, Hail!". Prior to leaving for Liberia around 1860, he was the head of a well-established musical family in the United States known as the "Luca Family Singers."
