= 1975 Liberian presidential term referendum =

A referendum on presidential terms was held in Liberia on 7 October 1975, alongside simultaneous general elections. The change would limit a president to serving for a single term of eight years. Incumbent President William Tolbert promised he would leave office in 1983 even if the change was rejected. It passed with 90% of voters in favour.

== Results ==
Choice	Votes	%
For		90
Against		10
Total		
Registered voters/turnout		88
Source: Direct Democracy
