= George T. Washington (Liberia) =

Liberian politician

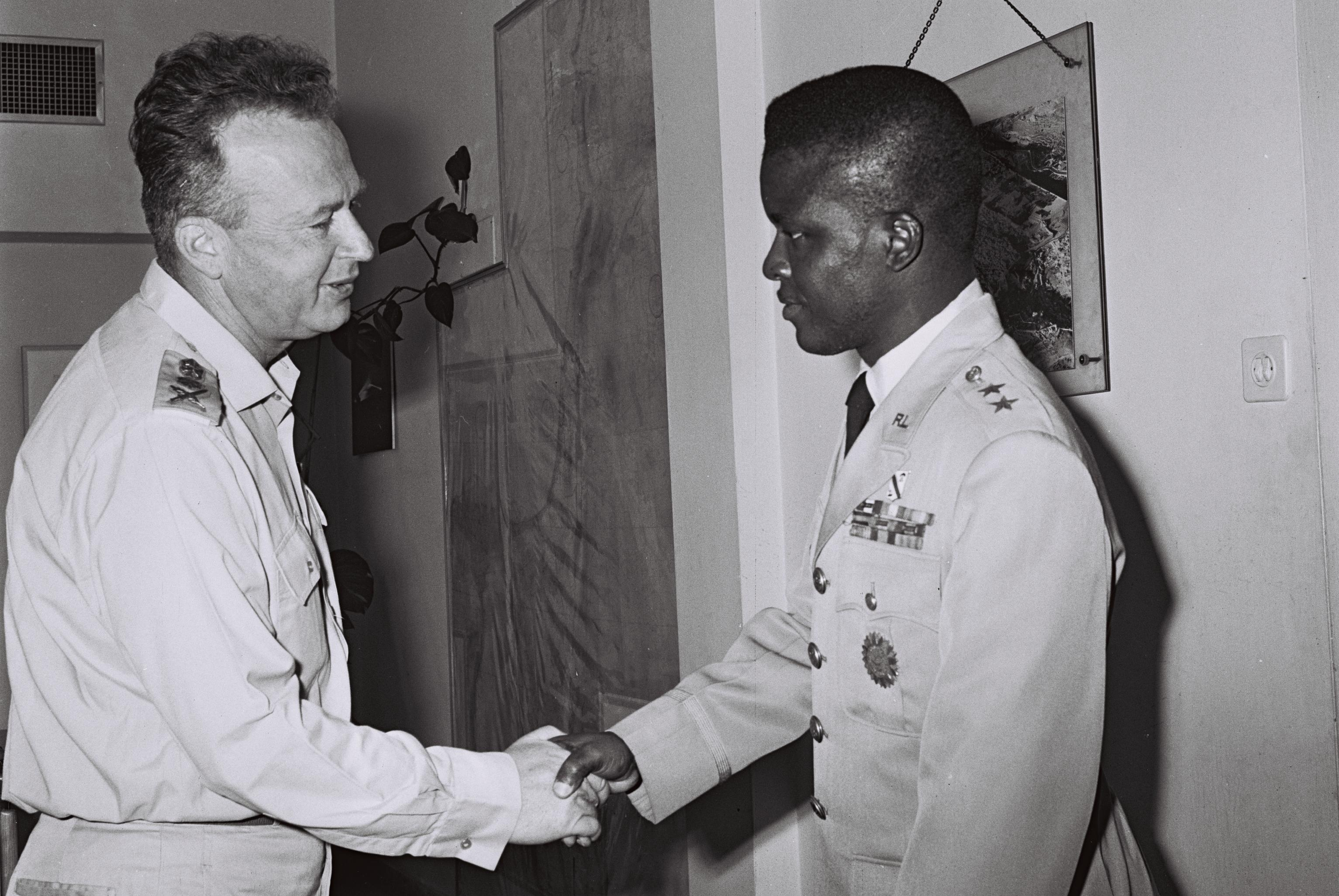
Israel's Chief of the General Staff Yitzhak Rabin with George T. Washington at Rabin's office in Tel Aviv, 1967

George Toe Washington was a Liberian three-star general and political figure. He served as Army Chief of Staff under President William V.S. Tubman. In Liberia's 1997 presidential election, he ran for the PDPL, receiving 0.56% of the popular vote. After the election, allegations were made of corruption, including that the location where Washington had cast a vote for himself reported zero votes for him.

A Liberian diplomat, Washington received many honors in the Decorated Distinguished Service Order, including the Distinguished Service medal. He was a Knight Commander in the Humane Order of African Redemption, Grand Commander of the Order of the Star of Africa, and Knight Great Band of the Humane Order of African Redemption. In 1973, he was named to the Allied Officers Hall of Fame at the United States Army Command and General Staff College.

== Personal life ==
George Toe Washington was born on April 15, 1928, in Barclayville, Liberia. His parents were of Seyon Toe and Janet Tiegbey Doe Washington. He married and later divorced Cora Victoria Garnett after 12 years of marriage. The union produced five children, George Toe Jr., Anna, Wendy, Georgia and Gloria.

== Education ==
Washington gained a Bachelor of Business Administration at the Business College in Kibi, Ghana, in 1948. He graduated from the United States Army Quarter Master School in 1956. In 1960, he graduated from the Foreign Service Institute in Monrovia, Liberia. The next year, back in the United States, he graduated from the United States Army Logistic Management College In Fort Leavenworth, Kansas, he graduated from the United States Army Command and General Staff College in 1964.

He gained a Master of Arts in Public Administration from Century University, Beverly Hills, California, in 1982, and became a Doctor of Philosophy in Public Administration the year later. At Johns Hopkins University School of Advanced International Studies, in 1987, Washington earned a Masters in International Public Policy.

== Career ==
Washington held many titles over his long career. He was Quartermaster General of the Armed Forces of Liberia from 1956 to 1959, Deputy Chief of Staff for Logistics from 1959 to 1964, Deputy Chief of Staff for Personnel, Adjunct General from 1964 to 1965, Chief of Staff from 1965 to 1970, Advisor to the President on Military Affairs Government of Liberia from 1970 to 1971, Special Assistant for Field Operations in the Ministry of Education from 1973 to 1975, Director of the National Force for Eradication of Corruption from 1975 to 1980, Governor of the Kru Coast Territory from 1977 to 1980, Liberian Ambassador to China from 1981 to 1983, and Liberian Ambassador to the United States in Washington, D.C., from 1983 to 1985.

He was Advisor of the World Conference of Mayors from 1984 to 1987, Director of International Programs for the World Congress of Cities & Towns from 1987 to 1988, and Executive Director of the African Social Club in Washington, D.C., in 1989.

Washington was a Visiting Lecturer for the Defense Institute of Security Assistance Management in Dayton, Ohio, a member of the Liberian Delegation to the Organisation of African Unity in 1965 and 1979 a guest of the Federal Republic of Nigeria in 1965, Israel in 1967, Kingdom of Morocco in 1967, and Republic of Ghana in 1968.

== Memberships ==
From 1975-1976, Washington was President of St. Thomas Episcopal Church Men in Monrovia, Liberia, then Chairman of Bishop's Committee St. Thomas Episcopal Chapel, Monrovia, from 1976-1977.

He was Chairman of the Kru Coast Territory Development Association from 1975-1977, and was a member of the American Political Science Association, American Society for Public Administration, American Management Association, and American Consultant League.
