= Allen Yancy =

Liberian politician (1881–1941)

Allen N. Yancy (1881–1941) was the 20th vice president of Liberia from 1928 to 1930 under President Charles D. B. King. He was forced to resign in 1930 following his involvement with forced labor exported to the Spanish-controlled island of Fernando Po (in today's Equatorial Guinea).

== Presidential election of 1927 ==
The 1927 elections had two major issues: the use of foreign capital in Liberia, and the "Open Door Policy". The use of foreign capital in the development of the county had been a controversial issue in Liberia for many years, and continued when negotiations with Harvey Firestone led to the Firestone Concession Agreement in 1926. The United Kingdom, which dominated the world rubber industry following World War I, enacted policies to limit the rubber supply in response to a sharp drop in prices following the war. Called The Stevenson Plan, it went into force on 1 January 1922. The Stevenson Plan was hurtful to the United States economy, as the increase of a penny per pound of rubber would mean a loss of $8 million. Firestone, angered by Britain's policies, was determined to find a way for America to grow its own rubber. Liberia was very suitable for rubber production due to its tropical, humid climate, and Firestone began making a series of agreements with Liberia to acquire land and eliminate Liberia's debts to Great Britain, culminating in the agreement of 1926. The agreement, which Firestone called "the greatest concession of its kind ever made", gave him virtually no tax obligations to Liberia, and exclusive land rights to about 10% of the country's arable land. The Liberian government, on the other hand, obligated themselves to a 5 million dollar loan from Firestone through his wholly owned subsidiary, the Finance Corporation of America. An American financial advisor appointed by the United States controlled Liberia's finances and approved the country's annual budget. These concessions, which practically made Liberia a protectorate of the United States, were opposed both inside and outside the country.

Political offices
Preceded by Henry Too Wesley	Vice President of Liberia; 1928–1930	Succeeded by Clarence Simpson
