= Independent National Patriotic Front of Liberia =

Faction in the First Liberian Civil War

National Patriotic Front of Liberia – Central Revolutionary Council
- Leader: Prince Johnson
- Dates active: 1989-1992
- Active regions: Liberia
- Size: ?
- Wars: the Liberian Civil War

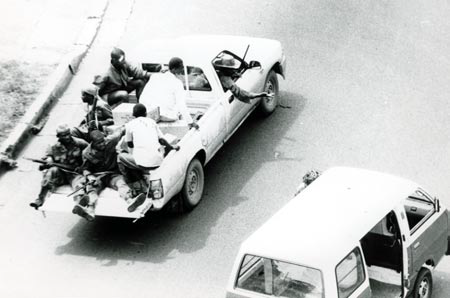
INPLF troops in Monrovia after the town's capture in 1990

The Independent National Patriotic Front of Liberia (INPFL) was a rebel group that participated in the First Liberian Civil War under the leadership of Prince Johnson. It was a breakaway faction of the National Patriotic Front of Liberia (NPFL).

The INPFL was formed by Prince Johnson after a leadership dispute with NPFL leader Charles Taylor over his authority as self-proclaimed head of the National Patriotic Reconstruction Assembly Government (NPRAG), an alternative government that was based in the Bong County town of Gbarnga.

Initially estimated at less than 500 troops, the INPFL was a significant force in the early stages of the war. It controlled a number of strategic points within the capital city of Monrovia and facilitated the deployment of Economic Community of West African States (ECOWAS) cease-fire monitoring group forces, known as ECOMOG.

It was the INPFL which captured and murdered President Samuel Doe in September 1990.

The faction disintegrated in the wake of internal wrangling over its level of co-operation with the interim government, ECOMOG and the NPFL. Through 1991, its role in the conflict substantially declined and the faction formally disbanded in late 1992.
