= 1975 Liberian general election =

- 7 October 1975
- Turnout: 80%
- Presidential election
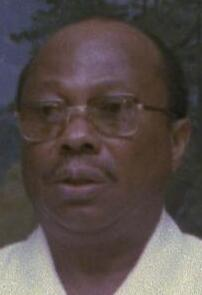
Nominee	William Tolbert
Party	TWP
Running mate	James Edward Greene
Percentage	100%
President before election
William Tolbert
TWP
Elected President
William Tolbert
TWP

General elections were held in Liberia on 7 October 1975, alongside a simultaneous referendum on presidential term limits. In the presidential election, incumbent William Tolbert of the True Whig Party (who had taken office after the death of William Tubman in 1971) was the only candidate, and was re-elected unopposed. In the legislative elections True Whig Party candidates won all 74 seats in the House of Representatives unopposed. Voter turnout was around 80%.

The elections were the first after the eligible age of voters in elections was reduced to 18. It was a combined elections for choosing the President, Representatives of the House and the Senate. Independent observers claim that the elections in 1975 along with that of the earlier elections were rigged by the ruling True Whig Party. This is the last election in which the True Whig Party won a presidential election.

== Electoral system ==
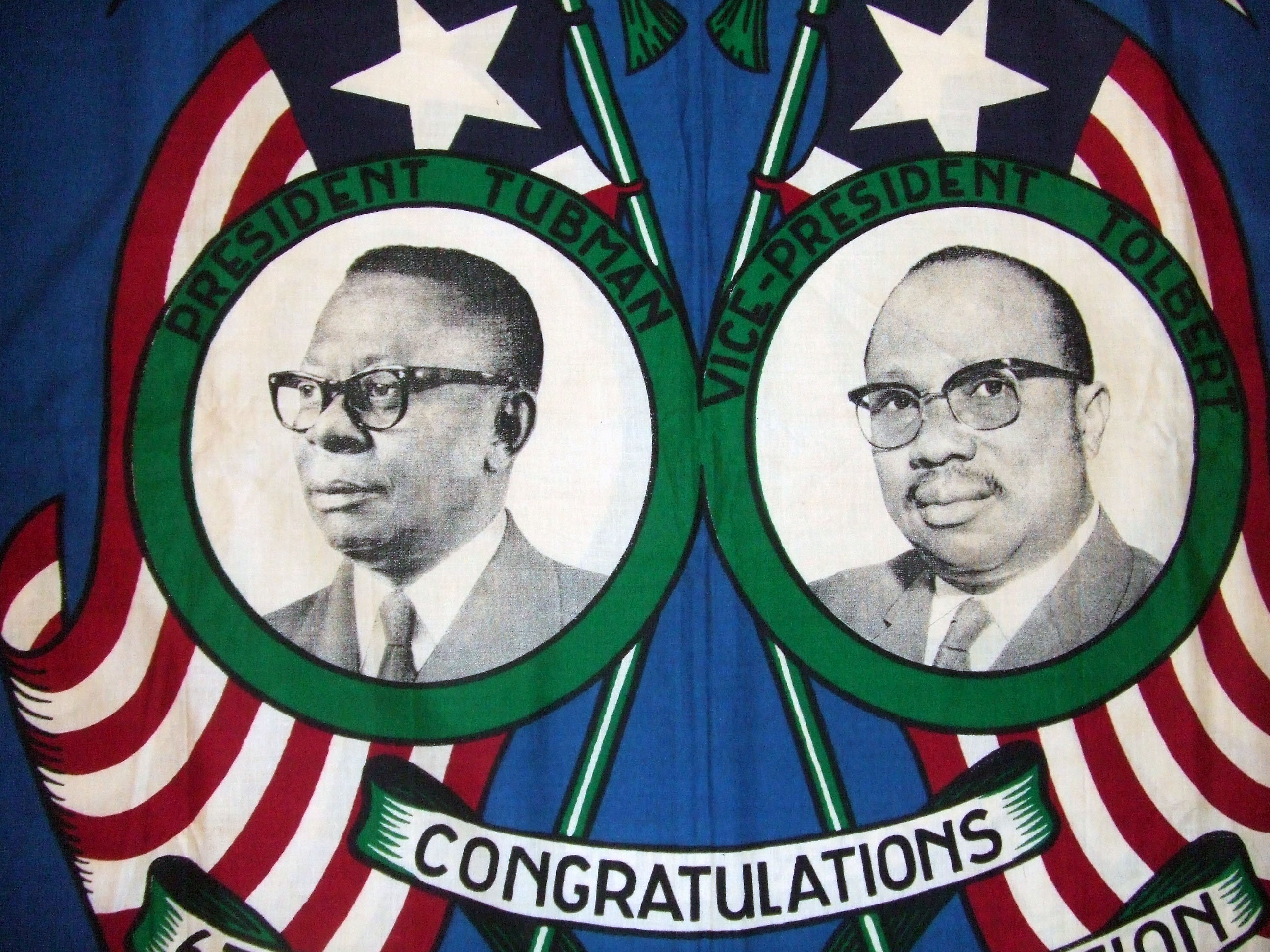
A Commemorative wrap of Presidents Tubman and Tolbert

The Legislature of Liberia was modeled on the Legislature of United States. It is bicameral in nature with a Senate and the House of Representatives. There are 15 counties in the country and based on the population, each county is defined to have at least two members, while the total number of members to the house including the Speaker being 74. Each member represents an electoral district and elected to a four-year term (six years after 2011 elections) based on popular vote. There were 18 senators, two each for the nine counties and they serve a six-year term (30 senators, 15 counties and nine years from 2011). Senators are also elected based on plurality of votes. The vice-president is the head of the Senate and he also acts as president in his absence.

To be eligible as a voter, one had to possess 18 years of age, registered on electoral rolls and own a real estate valued at least L$2,000. Persons who are of foreign origin, insane and convicted in crime were not eligible. The eligibility criteria to be candidate of a political party in the House of Representatives was residence in the country for two years continuously before the elections, ownership of real estate and should be 23 years of age. The eligibility criteria to be candidate of a political party in the Senate was residence in the country for three years continuously before the elections, ownership of real estate and should be 25 years of age.

== Conduct ==
Independent observers claim that the elections in 1975 along with that of the earlier elections were rigged by the ruling True Whig Party. All the candidates of the Party during the elections were unopposed. In spite of no opposition, the number of eligible voters were enhanced by around 200,000, making the number of voters more than the number of eligible voters. There were no voter registries maintained during the elections and people were allowed to vote many number of times. A view has also been placed that the electorate lost confidence in the election system thereby leading to frequent political crisis in the country.

== Results ==
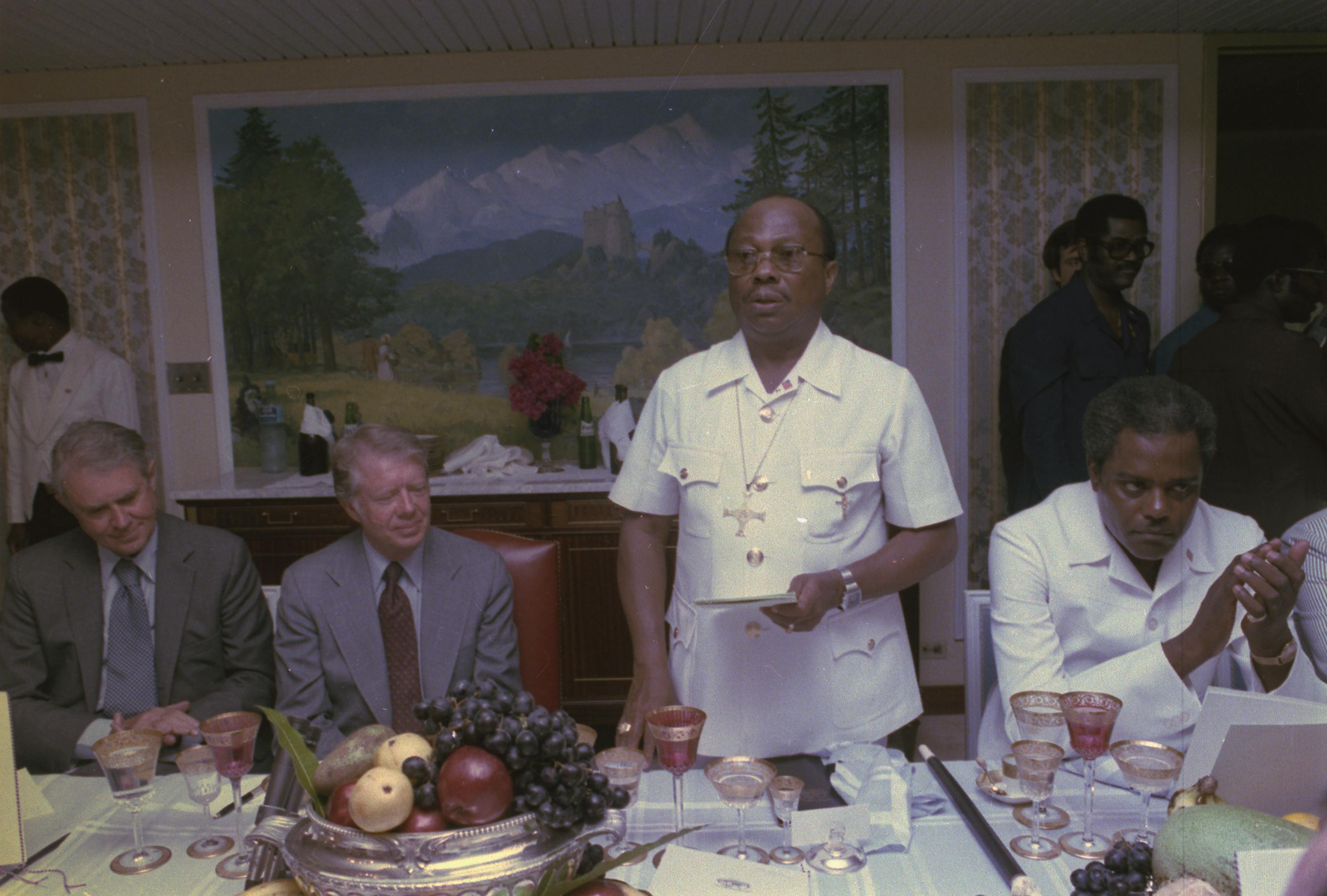
US President Jimmy Carter and Secretary of State Cyrus Vance attend a luncheon hosted by President of Liberia William Tolbert, 3 April 1978.

Incumbent President Tolbert from True Whig Party campaigned that if they were re-elected to power, the government would work towards rural empowerment and the infrastructure development. Tolbert was re-elected as the president of the country along with all the candidates of his party for the House of Representatives and the Senate. During 1975, there was an amendment to the constitution that prevented a single person from continuing as president for more than two four-year terms.

=== House of Representatives ===
Party	Seats
True Whig Party	74
Total	74
Source: IPU
