= National Patriotic Front of Liberia =

Rebel group which initiated the First Liberian Civil War (1989–96)

- Emblem of the NPFL
- Leader: Charles Taylor
- Dates active: 1980s–1996
- Allegiance: Greater Liberia (1989–1997)
- Headquarters: Gborplay (until 1990); Gbarnga (1990–1997)
- Active regions: Liberia and Sierra Leone
- Size: +25,000
- Wars: Liberian Civil War
- Flag

The National Patriotic Front of Liberia (NPFL) was a Liberian rebel group that initiated and participated in the First Liberian Civil War from 24 December 1989 to 2 August 1997. The NPFL emerged out of rising ethnic tensions and civil unrest due to the Liberian government that was characterized by totalitarianism, corruption, and favoritism towards ethnic Krahns. The NPFL invaded Liberia through Ivory Coast's border with Nimba County in Liberia under the direction of Charles Taylor, a former Liberian politician and guerrilla leader who served as the 22nd president of Liberia from 2 August 1997 until his resignation on 11 August 2003.

The NPFL was responsible for a vast array of war crimes and crimes against humanity, including mass murder, rape, sexual slavery, conscription of child soldiers, torture, and political assassinations. Over 60,000 human rights violations committed by the NPFL were formally recorded by the Liberian Truth and Reconciliation Commission.

== Leadership ==
Flag as used by the NPFL

The military aspects of NPFL were led by Charles Taylor, who instructed the NPFL to take up arms against the regime of Samuel Doe on 24 December 1989. Ellen Johnson Sirleaf, who served as the 24th president of Liberia from 16 January 2006 – 22 January 2018, was the International Coordinator of the NPFL and helped raise money for the rebel group. Sirleaf later disavowed Taylor and went on to win a Nobel Peace Prize for supporting the non-violent struggle for the safety of women to participate in peace-building work. Tom Woewiyu served as the Defense Minister and spokesman of the NPLF and worked to justify the rebel group's mission and objectives to high ranking foreign officials. Martina Johnson was one of the NPFL front line commanders and allegedly directly participated in mutilation and mass killing in late 1992 during an NPFL offensive known as Operation Octopus.

== External actors ==
The rise of NPFL was supported by African countries and leaders that extended far beyond Liberian borders. In the early stages of the NPFL, the rebel group was backed notably by Muammar Gaddafi, who served as the de facto leader of Libya from 1969 to 2011. Gaddafi was introduced to Taylor by the 2nd president of Burkina Faso, Blaise Compaoré. Both Libya and Burkina Faso served as training grounds and bases for the initial Liberian insurgents. Gaddafi and Compaoré continued their support for the NPFL by supplying arms and military advisors. Under the orders of Taylor and Compaoré, NPFL troops were actively involved in the 1987 Burkina Faso coup d'état and assassination of the then Burkinabé President Thomas Sankara. Journalist Mark Huband, who was kidnapped by the NPFL while reporting in Liberia, notes in his book The Liberian Civil War that Compaoré's involvement in the war suited his Francophone fellow leaders who were as eager as France to confront the Anglo-Saxon presence in the region by promoting a rebellion that was certain to dilute American influence in West Africa.

In the early 1980s, Liberia was also considered one of America's most important African allies. During the Reagan administration, Liberia played a pivotal role in the United States' efforts to counteract Gaddafi's Libya, which had been identified as a state sponsor of terrorism. Liberia served as a staging ground for a CIA task force against Gaddafi's regime. To facilitate covert aid to the Angolan rebel movement UNITA, the United States upgraded Roberts Field airport and utilized the Kamina and Kinshasa air bases in Zaire as key transit points. In exchange for its cooperation, the Doe regime in Liberia received substantial financial assistance from the United States. From 1980 to 1985, Liberia received nearly $500 million in military and economic aid, which amounted to one-third of its operating budget. At the time, this rendered Liberia the largest recipient of U.S. aid in sub-Saharan Africa on a per capita basis.

== Ethnic divides ==
Flag of the NPFL's "Commando Special Forces"

Following a series of coups d'états attempted by Commanding General Thomas Quiwonkpa of the Armed Forces of Liberia (AFL) and his ally later turned enemy Master Sergeant Samuel Doe, tensions between the Dan, Mano, and Krahn ethnic groups increased. Quiwonkpa was of Dan origin, whereas Doe was a member of the indigenous Krahn ethnic group. While Quiwonkpa and Doe initially joined together to overthrow Liberian President William Tolbert in a military coup on 12 April 1980, it was not long before these two fell out of step. Following the assassination of President William Tolbert, Doe rose to power and assumed office as the 21st president of Liberia from 1980 until his murder in 1990. In 1983, Doe demoted Quiwonkpa from his position as the commanding general of the Liberian armed forces and subsequently charged him with an attempt to overthrow his presidency, forcing him out of the country. Two years later, Quiwonkpa returned, set on launching a retaliatory coup d'état against Doe. With the support of two dozen heavily armed soldiers, Quiwonkpa covertly entered Liberia through Sierra Leone in an attempt to remove Doe from power. However, Quiwonkpa's coup d'état resulted in failure. Quiwonkpa was captured on 15 November 1985 and was killed and mutilated by Krahn soldiers loyal to Doe.

Charles Taylor worked in the government of Samuel Doe, but was later removed following accusations of embezzlement and imprisoned by President Doe. Taylor would escape prison in 1989 and flee to Libya, where he was trained as a guerrilla fighter. He returned to Liberia in 1989 to overthrow the Doe government, now leading a group of Libyan-backed rebels, the NPFL, initiating the First Liberian Civil War (1989–1996). Most NPFL fighters were originally drawn from the Dan and Mano ethnic groups of northern Liberia who were persecuted under Doe's Krahn regime. President Doe was captured in Monrovia on 9 September 1990, by Prince Y. Johnson, one of Liberia's most infamous warlords and former leader of INPFL, a breakaway faction of the National Patriotic Front of Liberia. Prince Y. Johnson took President Doe to his military base where he brutally tortured him until death. Following Doe's execution, Taylor gained control of a large portion of the country and became one of the most prominent warlords in Africa.

== Membership ==
According to estimates, the National Patriotic Front of Liberia boasted a membership of approximately 25,000 combatants, and its actions were associated with a range of human rights violations, including but not limited to massacres, sexual violence, forced recruitment of child soldiers, mutilation, torture, kidnapping, and political assassinations. In addition to the ongoing civil war in Liberia, the rebel group supported the Revolutionary United Front (RUF) in Sierra Leone, fomenting unrest against the military government in order to secure control over the local diamond trade in the region. The Revolutionary United Front (RUF) emerged as a collective of Sierra Leonean nationals who endeavored to emulate Charles Taylor's previous triumph in overthrowing the Liberian government. Alongside founder Foday Sankoh, of Temne background, and allies Abu Kanu and Rashid Mansaray, the RUF received substantial assistance from Charles Taylor in developing the leadership positions of the organization.

== Support ==
The NPFL rapidly expanded from a small force of a few hundred troops to a vast, irregular army that controlled almost 90% of Liberia within a year due to significant domestic support. NPFL efforts to capture the capital city of Monrovia were thwarted by the arrival of the Economic Community of West African States (ECOWAS) cease-fire monitoring group, ECOMOG. In response, the NPFL created an alternative national administration in 1991 called the National Patriotic Reconstruction Assembly Government (NPRAG), based in the Bong County town of Gbarnga. The formation of NPRAG was an opposition response to the leadership of the internationally recognized Interim Government of National Unity (IGNU), headed by interim president Amos Sawyer. Taylor's authority as self-proclaimed head of the NPRAG was, however, challenged by a breakaway faction, known as the Independent National Patriotic Front of Liberia (INPFL), led by Prince Yormie Johnson. The INPFL troops were estimated to number less than 500, yet rapidly gained control of parts of central Monrovia.

== Operation Octopus ==
On 15 October 1992, the NPFL launched "Operation Octopus" in a bid to overrun the capital Monrovia, Charles Taylor ordered the NPFL and the Small Boys Unit (SBU), composed of child soldiers, to attack opponents Economic Community of West African States Monitoring Group (ECOMOG), the Armed Forces of Liberia (AFL), and the United Liberation Movement of Liberia for Democracy (ULIMO) forces. Although the NPFL never maintained long-term control of the capital, the group controlled the neighboring cities and countryside in addition to Liberia's rich natural resource deposits. Only one month after the fighting began, the World Health Organization estimated that up to 3,000 civilians and combatants had been killed. The SBU was composed of children as young as ten and twelve years old who were drugged by Taylor's men and trained how to throw grenades and shoot AK-47s overnight. Intense fighting occurred both within the city and its outskirts, with Gardnersville, Barnersville, New Georgia, and Caldwell suburban regions being particularly hard hit by the rebels. Approximately 200,000 people were displaced due to the conflict.

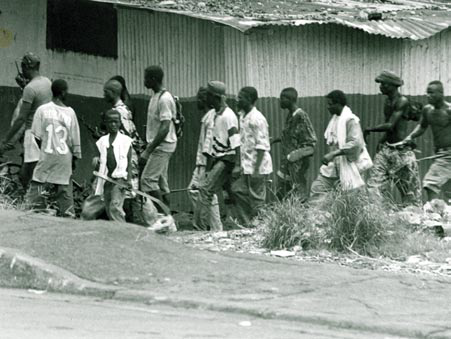
National Patriotic Liberation Front fighters search for ULIMO soldiers in Monrovia.

The urgency of the conflict in Monrovia compelled ECOMOG to adopt a new defense strategy by enlisting the aid of other Liberian factions in combatting the NPFL. However, the human rights record of these factions, namely the United Liberation Movement of Liberia for Democracy (ULIMO) and the Armed Forces of Liberia (AFL), were questionable. The AFL had been discredited due to its heinous abuses during the 1980s and especially during the First Liberian Civil War, where it massacred civilians and wreaked havoc in Monrovia. Similarly, ULIMO, which was an offshoot of the AFL, reportedly conducted attacks on civilians, looting, and executions of suspected NPFL sympathizers in the areas it captured in 1992.

Although the formal connections between the AFL and ULIMO remain unclear, it is worth noting that most of ULIMO's key commanders were former AFL leaders, and many AFL soldiers apparently left their barracks to join ULIMO. Initially, ECOMOG supported the AFL's right to defend itself from NPFL attack and subsequently allowed the AFL to operate alongside multinational troops, although it retained a separate command structure and controlled certain areas independently. While ECOMOG claimed that ULIMO operated autonomously, it was evident that there was some coordination between the groups. Operation Octopus and the greater armed conflict in Liberia had ramifications that extended into the neighboring Sierra Leone and its ongoing civil war. The spill-over prompted the Economic Community of West African States (ECOWAS) to undertake a peacekeeping intervention. Subsequently, a peace agreement was signed in 1996, paving the way for democratic elections on 19 July 1997.

== Political aspirations ==
Liberia's seven-year civil war was brought to an end by the democratic elections of 1997. Preceding the elections, there were several treaties ratified to establish peace in Liberia. These include the Cotonou Accord on 25 July 1993, the Akosombo Agreement on 12 August 1994, and its Accra Clarification. One of the final thirteen peace agreements, the Abuja Agreement, was signed on 19 August 1995 in Nigeria. As part of this agreement, Taylor consented to the dissolution of the NPFL and its subsequent transformation into a civilian political party, which ultimately became the National Patriotic Party (NPP). Charles Taylor and the NPP won the 19 July 1997 election with a substantial majority, winning 49 of 64 seats in the House of Representatives and 21 of 26 in the Senate. While international observers deemed the polls administratively free and transparent, they noted that it had taken place in an atmosphere of intimidation because most voters believed that Taylor would resume the war if defeated. Taylor's electoral victory was met with allegations of unjust practices, such as giving handouts to the destitute and illiterate electorate, yet he claimed victory with 75 percent of the total votes cast.
