= Henry Too Wesley =

Liberian lawyer and politician

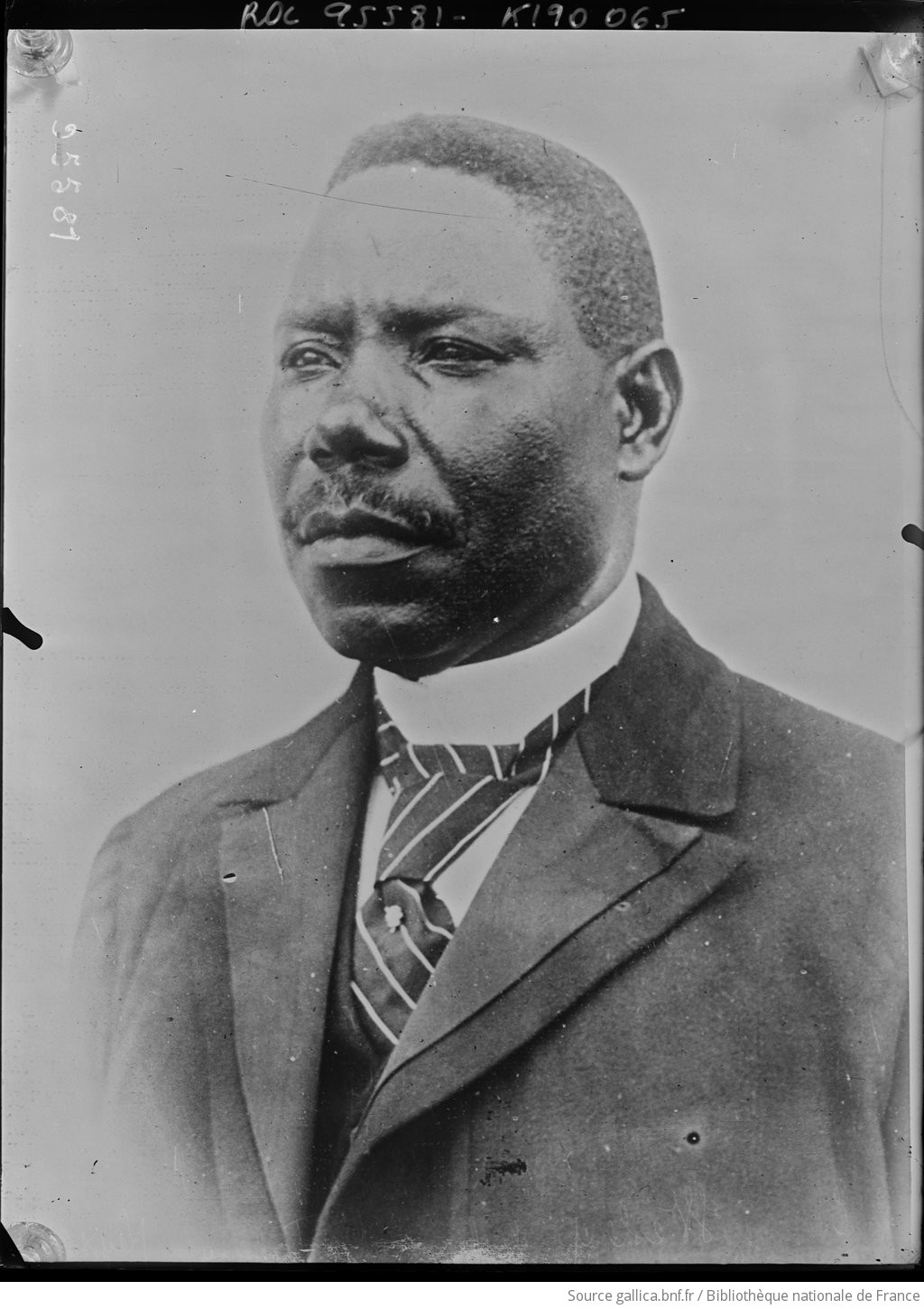
Wesley in 1924

Henry Toö Wesley (5 December 1877 – 18 June 1944) was a Liberian lawyer and politician who served as the country's 19th vice president from 1924 to 1928. A member of the Grebo ethnic group, Wesley was Liberia's first indigenous vice president.

He was born in Maryland County, Liberia, in 1877. He was a member of the Senate prior to being elected to the office of vice president. He was the second of three vice presidents to serve under Charles D. B. King.

Political offices
Preceded by Samuel Alfred Ross	Vice President of Liberia; 1924 – 1928	Succeeded by Allen Yancy
