= Nicholas Podier =

Liberian soldier and government official

Jlatoh Nicholas Podier, Jr.
- Born: Liberia
- Died: 1 July 1988; Monrovia, Liberia
- Political party: People's Redemption Council

Jlatoh Nicholas Podier, Jr. (died 1 July 1988) was a Liberian soldier and government official who played a role in the 1980 coup d'état that overthrew the government of President William R. Tolbert Jr.

Following the coup, the soldiers formed the ruling People's Redemption Council (PRC), of which Podier was a member. He served as co-chairman of the council, effectively making him Vice Head of State during the early period of military rule. In the aftermath of the coup, he was promoted to general officer rank, although sources differ on whether he held the rank of brigadier general or major general.

By the mid-1980s, divisions had emerged within the PRC leadership. Podier was later implicated by the government of President Samuel K. Doe in alleged coup plotting. He died on 1 July 1988 in circumstances described by the government as a gun battle on one of Liberia's borders. However, other accounts disputed this version, suggesting he may have been detained and killed as part of Doe's efforts to consolidate power. Two Americans captured by government forces during the gun battle, James Bush and Curtis Williams, were later freed under pressure from the United States Department of State.
