= Prince Johnson =

Liberian politician (1952–2024)

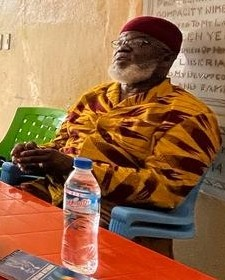
- Johnson in 2023

Member of the Senate of Liberia from Nimba County
- In office 13 January 2006 – 28 November 2024
- Preceded by: NTLA
- Succeeded by: Samuel G. Kogar

Personal details
- Born: Prince Yormie Johnson; 6 July 1952 Tapeta, Nimba, Liberia
- Died: 28 November 2024 (aged 72) Paynesville, Montserrado, Liberia
- Party: MDR (2016–2024)
- Other political affiliations: Independent (until 2010; 2014–2016); NUDP (2010–2014)
- Children: Prince Johnson, Jr.

Military service
- Allegiance: Liberia
- Branch/service: Liberian Army
- Years of service: 1971–1983 (LNG); 1989–1992 (NPFL)
- Rank: Brigadier general
- Battles/wars: First Liberian Civil War

Prince Yormie Johnson (Note: "Prince" is a common given name for men in Liberia, rather than a royal title.) (6 July 1952 – 28 November 2024) was a Liberian warlord and politician, who served as a senator for Nimba County from 2006 to 2024. Once a rebel leader, Johnson played a prominent role in the First Liberian Civil War.

After previously serving as an officer in the Armed Forces of Liberia, Johnson allied himself with Charles Taylor's National Patriotic Front of Liberia (NPFL) rebel group when it launched the First Liberian Civil War in 1989 to overthrow President Samuel Doe. Due to a rift with Taylor, Johnson soon formed an NPFL splinter group, the Independent National Patriotic Front of Liberia (INPFL), which captured, tortured and executed Doe in 1990. Following continued clashes with Taylor and the pro-Doe ULIMO group, the INPFL was disbanded and Johnson was forced into exile in Nigeria in 1992. There he converted to Christianity and reconciled with the Doe family.

Johnson returned to Liberia in 2004 following the end of the Second Liberian Civil War. He was elected to the Senate of Liberia in the 2005 Liberian general election. He founded a political party, the National Union for Democratic Progress (NUDP) in 2010, before being expelled from it in 2014.

He founded a new party, Movement for Democracy and Reconstruction (MDR) in 2016. He was re-elected to the Senate in 2014 and 2023. He was also an unsuccessful candidate for President in 2011 and 2017, respectively finishing in third and fourth place in the first round.

== Early life ==
Johnson was born in Tapeta, Nimba County, in the east-central interior of the country, and was brought up by an uncle in the capital city of Monrovia. In 1971, while living in Monrovia, he joined the Liberian National Guard (LNG), which was transformed into the Armed Forces of Liberia (AFL) in the aftermath of Samuel Doe's 1980 overthrow of President William R. Tolbert.

He rose to the rank of Lieutenant, receiving military training in both Liberia and the United States, where he was instructed in military police duties in South Carolina. A stern, often draconian, disciplinarian, he served as aide-de-camp to Gen. Thomas Quiwonkpa, the Commanding General of the Armed Forces of Liberia, and accompanied him into exile in 1983, after Quiwonkpa was accused of plotting a coup against Doe.

== Liberia's civil war and warlordship ==
Johnson later allied with Charles Taylor as part of the National Patriotic Front of Liberia (NPFL), serving as the NPFL's Chief Training Officer. Taylor's fighters crossed the border from Ivory Coast and began operations in Liberia on Christmas Eve, 1989.

=== Formation of the INPFL ===
An internal power struggle resulted in Johnson breaking off from the Taylor-led NPFL and forming the Independent National Patriotic Front of Liberia (INPFL). Despite intervention in the civil war by the Economic Community of West African States Monitoring Group (ECOMOG), INPFL forces captured most of Monrovia in the late summer of 1990.

During the civil war, Johnson was notorious for killing anyone who opposed or criticised his actions. When Hare Krishna devotees, who were distributing food to starving people in Monrovia in the midst of the chaos of the civil war, sent him a letter begging him to stop killing people, he personally orchestrated the murder of Hladini devi dasi—born Linda Jury—and five of her students on the bank of the Saint Paul River on the night of Thursday, 13 September 1990.

=== Killing of President Doe ===
On 9 September 1990, Johnson's supporters abducted President Samuel Doe from ECOMOG headquarters in the Monrovia port district. Doe was tortured and executed in Johnson's custody on 9 September, with the spectacle videotaped and broadcast around the world. The video showed Johnson sipping a Budweiser beer and being fanned by an assistant as his men cut off Doe's ear.

Johnson later denied killing Doe.

=== Claim to power ===
After Doe's death Johnson briefly claimed the presidency of Liberia. Johnson's claim to power ended following the consolidation of rebel power under Charles Taylor. In an attempt by the weak national government to reconstruct Liberian politics, the INPFL was recognised at a conference held in Guinea, where Amos Sawyer was elected president.

=== Flight to Nigeria ===
Johnson was forced to flee to Nigeria to avoid capture by rebel forces supporting Taylor and was not involved in the Second Liberian Civil War. He lived in Nigeria for 12 years.

While in Nigeria, Johnson became a Christian and reconciled with the Doe family through the intervention of Nigerian pastor TB Joshua.

== Return and public office ==
Johnson returned to Liberia in March 2004, following the resignation of Taylor as president and the installation of a transitional government. He stated his intention to return to politics, though he briefly left Liberia again on 7 April due to death threats he had received from the Liberians United for Reconciliation and Democracy (LURD) rebel group. In the 2005 general elections, Johnson contested and won a Senate seat representing Nimba County. For a period he served as the chair of the Senate's defence committee.

In 2008, Johnson stated that he and Charles Taylor had been solicited to assassinate Thomas Sankara, naming Blaise Compaoré as the instigator, with the surety of Félix Houphouët-Boigny. The investigation conducted since 2015 to clarify the circumstances of this assassination, however, seems to rule out this hypothesis, although doubts persist.

In the June 2009 final report of the Truth and Reconciliation Commission, which was established as part of the 2003 peace deal, the TRC recommended Johnson's inclusion on a list of 50 people who should be "specifically barred from holding public offices; elected or appointed for a period of thirty (30) years" for "being associated with former warring factions." Johnson labelled the recommendation a "joke," noting the absence of several other combatants from the list, and vowed to resist any charges brought as a result of the report.

In January 2011, the Supreme Court ruled in Williams v. Tah, a case brought by another person recommended for disqualification in the TRC report, that the TRC's recommendation was an unconstitutional violation of the listed individuals' right to procedural due process, and that it would be unconstitutional for the government to implement the proposed bans.

Johnson ran in Liberia's 2011 presidential election as the candidate of the newly formed National Union for Democratic Progress party. He placed third, with 11.6% of the vote; the election was won by the country's previous president, Ellen Johnson Sirleaf.

Ahead of the 2014 Senate election, Johnson was expelled from the NUDP. Johnson won re-election to the Senate as an independent.

By 2017, Johnson formed a new party, the Movement for Democracy and Reconstruction (MDR). Johnson contested the presidency with the party in the 2017 election. Johnson supported Coalition for Democratic Change (CDC) candidate George Weah in the subsequent run-off election. Weah was ultimately elected president.

On 9 December 2021, Johnson was sanctioned by the United States Department of Treasury for alleged political corruption, claiming he would sell votes in elections for financial gains.

Towards the ending of 2022, Johnson withdrew his support for President Weah and the CDC. Johnson cited the lack of Nimba County representation in top appointed positions. In December 2022, Johnson resigned as head of the MDR. In an MDR convention on 22 December, Senator Jeremiah Koung was elected standard bearer. As standard bearer, Koung continued Johnson's policy of opposing the CDC.

In the 2023 Senate election, Johnson was re-elected with the MDR.

== Death ==
Johnson died in a hospital in Paynesville, Montserrado on 28 November 2024, at the age of 72. He was granted a five-day state funeral and was buried at the PYJ Polytechnic University named after him in Ganta, Nimba County on 18 January 2025. Current Liberian President Joseph Boakai and former Liberian President George Weah attended his funeral.
