= Edward Kesselly =

Liberian politician

Dr. Edward Binyah Kesselly (1937-1993) was a minister in the Cabinet of William R. Tolbert, Jr. in Liberia. During the late 1970s, he headed the Ministry of Posts and Telecommunications; President Tolbert appointed him to the ministry on February 3, 1978. His predecessor as head of Posts and Telecommunications, J. Jenkins Peel, had resigned that office to become the Minister of Information, Cultural Affairs and Tourism, in which Kesselly had previously served as an administrator for five years. One of the few members of Tolbert's cabinet to survive the military coup d'état that overthrew Tolbert's government in 1980, he founded the Unity Party in 1984. Buried in Monrovia after his 1993 death, he was re-buried eighteen years later at his hometown of Nyama-Kamadu in Quardu Gboni District of Lofa County. Among the speakers at the pomp-filled reburial ceremony were Bureau of Maritime Authority Commissioner Edward Binyah Kesselly, Jr., his eldest son, and Unity Party standard bearer Ellen Johnson Sirleaf, the President of Liberia.
