= All Hail, Liberia, Hail! =

National anthem of Liberia

- National anthem of Liberia
- Lyrics: Daniel Bashiel Warner
- Music: Olmstead Luca
- Adopted: 1847

Audio sample
- U.S. Navy Band instrumental version (one verse): file; help

"All Hail, Liberia, Hail!" is the national anthem of Liberia. The lyrics were written by Daniel Bashiel Warner (1815–1880), who later became the third president of Liberia, and the music was composed by Olmstead Luca (1826–1869). It became the official national anthem upon Liberia's independence in 1847.

== History ==
=== 1974 proposed change to lyrics ===
On 22 July 1974, the Legislature of Liberia passed an act giving authorization to the president to establish a commission to give consideration to possible changes to a number of national symbols, including "All Hail, Liberia, Hail!" and the flag. President William Tolbert appointed 51 members to the Commission on National Unity. The commission was headed by McKinley Alfred Deshield Sr., and was also called the Deshield Commission. The commission sought to reexamine the symbols and remove divisive aspects of them. The commission submitted their report on 24 January 1978. The report recommended changing the word "benighted" in the anthem to the word "undaunted". The proposed change to the anthem was never made.

== Lyrics ==
I
𝄆 All hail, Liberia, hail! (All hail!) 𝄇
This glorious land of liberty
Shall long be ours.

𝄆 Though new her name,
Grand be her fame, (Note: Occasionally written "Great be her fame," especially in newer publications.)
And mighty be her powers, 𝄇
𝄆 And mighty be her powers, 𝄇

In joy and gladness
With our hearts united,
We'll shout the freedom
Of a race benighted,

Long live Liberia, happy land!
𝄆 A home of glorious liberty,
By God's command! 𝄇

II
𝄆 All hail, Liberia, hail! (All hail!) 𝄇
In union strong success is sure
We cannot fail!

𝄆 With God above
Our rights to prove
We will o'er all prevail, 𝄇
𝄆 We will o'er all prevail, 𝄇

With heart and hand
Our country's cause defending
We'll meet the foe
With valor unpretending.

Long live Liberia, happy land!
𝄆 A home of glorious liberty,
By God's command! 𝄇
