= Flag of Liberia =

Republic of Liberia
- Use: National flag and ensign
- Proportion: 10:19
- Adopted: 24 August 1847; 179 years ago
- Design: Eleven horizontal stripes alternating red and white; in the canton, a white star on a blue field
- Designed by: Susannah Elizabeth, Matilda Newport, Rachel Johnson, Mary Hunter, Sarah McGill Russwurm, Colonette Teage Ellis, and Sara Draper
- Use: Naval jack
- Proportion: 1:1

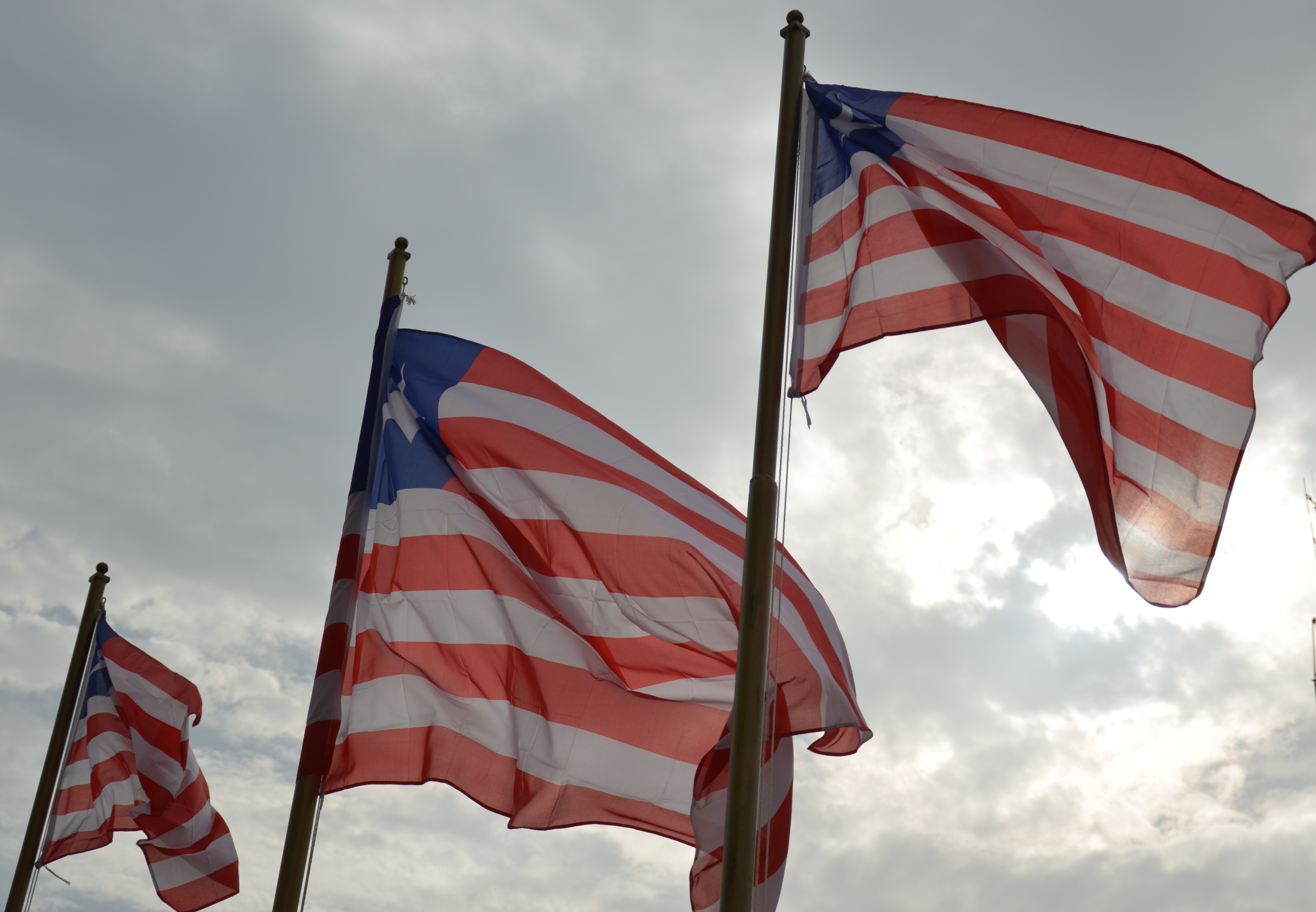
Multiple Liberian flags

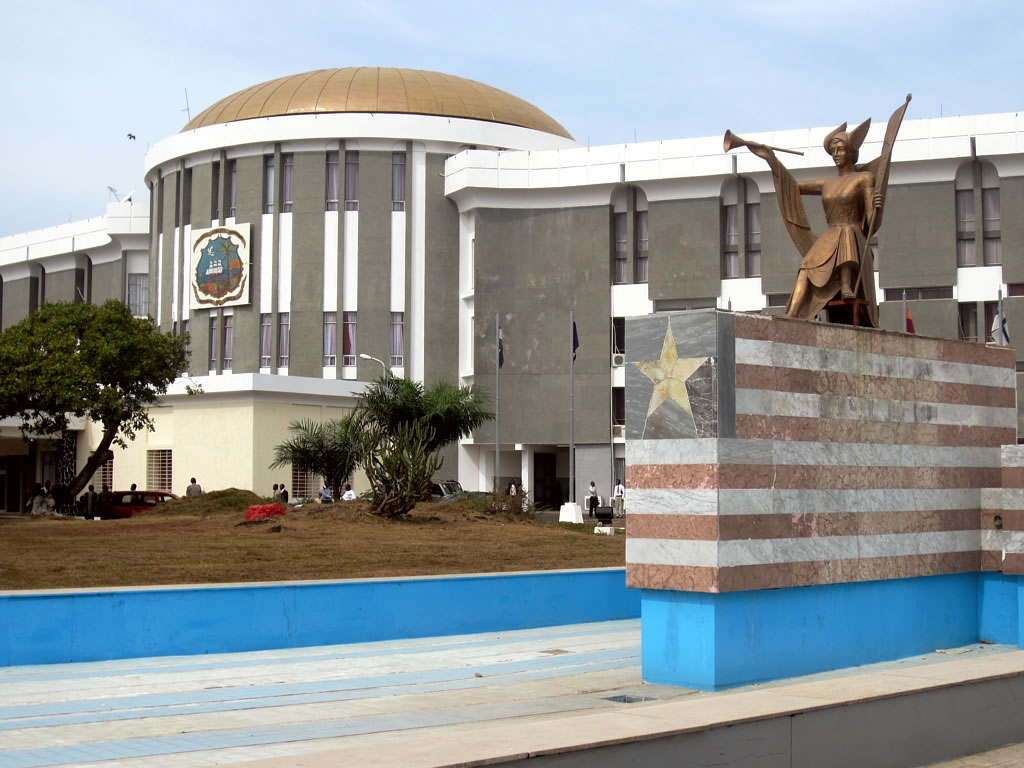
Flag recreated in colored marble at the Capitol building

The flag of Liberia, occasionally referred to as the Lone Star, bears a close resemblance to the flag of the United States, representing Liberia's founding by free people of color and former slaves from the United States and the Caribbean. They are both part of the stars and stripes flag family.

The Liberian flag has similar red and white stripes, as well as a blue square with a white star in the canton. It was adopted on 24 August 1847.

== History ==
On 9 April 1827, a resolution was made establishing the first flag of Liberia, during its time as a colony, which identified the flag the same as the United States, except with a white cross in the place of the canton’s stars. In preparation for independence, the flag of Liberia was redesigned and hand-stitched by a committee of seven women. Governor Joseph Jenkins Roberts, in a letter dated 10 July 1847, asked Susannah Elizabeth Lewis to head the committee. The other members of the committee were Matilda Newport, Rachel Johnson, Mary Hunter, Mrs. Sarah McGill Russwurm (wife of J. B. Russwurm), Colonette Teage Ellis, and Sara Draper. All of the women were born in the United States, and many of them were wives of prominent men in Liberia. Lewis was the daughter of former vice colonial agent Colston Waring, the sister of the first First Lady of the Republic, Jane Roberts, and wife of John N. Lewis, one of the signers of the Liberian Declaration of Independence. The flag they designed was adopted on 24 August 1847, about a month after Liberia had declared independence on 26 July 1847. The day the flag was adopted, the nation held a celebration in Monrovia. There, the flag was unfurled to the public for the first time, and Susannah Lewis gave a patriotic speech. The ceremony also featured speeches by a number of notable Liberian politicians and religious leaders, as well as entertainment in the form of band music.

In the 1850s and 1860s, the Eusibia N. Roye became the first Liberian-owned ship to display the flag in New York City and Liverpool ports. The vessel was owned by Edward James Roye. In 1860, the Liberian flag was featured on the first known stamp to be issued by the Liberian government. On 24 October 1915, President Daniel Edward Howard signed into law an act which proclaimed 24 August as Flag Day, a national holiday.

On 22 July 1974, the Legislature of Liberia passed an act giving authorization to the president to establish a commission to give consideration to possible changes to a number of national symbols, including the flag and national anthem. The commission was headed by McKinley Alfred Deshield Sr. The commission sought to reexamine the symbols, and remove divisive aspects of them. President William Tolbert appointed 51 members to the Commission on National Unity. The commission was also called the Deshield Commission, after the man who headed it. The commission submitted their report on 24 January 1978. The report ultimately recommended no changes to the flag.

In 2022, a new design for the five-hundred-dollar Liberian banknote featured an illustration of the seven-woman committee designing the Liberian flag.

The flag is seen on many ships around the world as Liberia offers registration under its flag. Shipping companies do this to avoid taxes and restrictions that other countries enforce. As the second most popular flag of convenience (after the flag of Panama), it is estimated that 1,700 foreign-owned ships fly the Liberian flag. This brings in much of the country's revenue.

== Symbolism ==
The eleven stripes symbolize the signatories of the Liberian Declaration of Independence, and their red and white colors symbolize courage and moral excellence. The white star represents the first independent republic in Africa, above the blue square representing the African continent. The Liberian flag is modeled after, and resembles, the United States flag, because Liberia was founded, colonized, established, and controlled, by free people of color and formerly enslaved Black people from the United States and the Caribbean with the help and support of both the United States government and the American Colonization Society (ACS); a private organization dedicated to the removal of free people of color from across North America. Some time after the African Americans began arriving in Liberia in 1822, they came to be identified as "Americo-Liberians" in an effort to separate them from native groups and enslaved Africans rescued from illegal slaving ports and ships by the U.S. Navy.

== Construction ==
A law of April 1961 describes the flag thus:

The National Flag of the Republic shall consist of eleven horizontal red and white stripes. The stripes shall alternate and the first and the last shall be red. There shall be a square blue canton extending from the left top corner of the Flag to the bottom of the third red stripe, and a large five-pointed star superimposed in the exact center of the blue canton.

Beyond describing it as "large", the law does not give the size of the five-pointed star.

== Other flags ==
=== County flags ===
Liberia is subdivided into 15 counties, each of which is entitled to its own flag. Each county flag bears the national flag of Liberia in the canton. The county flags are flown at regional offices and together encircling the national flag of Liberia at the Executive Mansion.

The flags of the then nine counties were introduced on 29 November 1965 under President William Tubman for the purpose of promoting the counties as meaningful entities. Their design was inspired by Liberia's quilting tradition.

The flags (particularly River Gee County) have been the subject of widespread ridicule by members of online vexillology communities on social media platforms such as Reddit and Facebook. However, vexillologist Steven A. Knowlton argues that these discussions demonstrate a lack of understanding of the political and cultural context of the flags and of the material construction of flags from textiles as opposed to digital creation.

Flag of Bomi County

Flag of Bong County

Flag of Gbarpolu County

Flag of Grand Bassa County

Flag of Grand Cape Mount County

Flag of Grand Gedeh County

Flag of Grand Kru County

Flag of Lofa County

Flag of Margibi County

Flag of Maryland County

Flag of Montserrado County

Flag of Nimba County

Flag of Rivercess County

Flag of River Gee County

Flag of Sinoe County

=== Military ===
Flag	Duration	Use	Description
		Flag of the Armed Forces of Liberia	A horizontal triband of red, blue, and light blue.
		Flag of the Liberian Customs Service	
		Naval jack of the Liberian National Coast Guard	A white star on a blue field.
		Flag of the Liberian Air Force	

=== Historical ===
Flag	Duration	Use	Description
	1837–1845	Flag of the United States	Used in the first government of the Commonwealth of Liberia until Saturday, 26 April 1845.
	1827–1847	Colony of Liberia	
	1854–1857	Republic of Maryland	

=== Miscellaneous ===
Standard of the president of the Republic of Liberia

Proposed in 1906, never used

== See also ==
- Coat of arms of Liberia
- All Hail, Liberia, Hail!
