= 1984 Liberian constitutional referendum =

Referendum approving a new constitution

3 July 1984

Results
Choice	Votes	%
Yes	540,113	98.58%
No	7,771	1.42%
Valid votes	547,884	96.65%
Invalid or blank votes	19,007	3.35%
Total votes	566,891	100.00%
Registered voters/turnout	689,928	82.17%

A referendum on a new constitution was held in Liberia on 3 July 1984. It was approved by 99% of voters, with a turnout of 82%. The new constitution came into force on 6 January 1986, following the 1985 general elections.

== Results ==
Choice	Votes	%
For	540,113	98.58
Against	7,771	1.42
Total	547,884	100.00
Valid votes	547,884	96.65
Invalid/blank votes	19,007	3.35
Total votes	566,891	100.00
Registered voters/turnout	689,929	82.17
Source: Nohlen et al.
