= Liberia Unification Party =

Political party in Liberia

The Liberia Unification Party was a political party in Liberia.

The party fielded candidates in the 11 October 2005 elections as part of the four-party Coalition for the Transformation of Liberia (COTOL).

In the 19 July 1997 legislative elections, the party was part of the Alliance of Political Parties, which won 2 out of 64 seats in the House of Representatives. While international observers deemed the polls administratively free and transparent, they noted that it had taken place in an atmosphere of intimidation because most voters believed that former rebel leader and National Patriotic Party (NPP) candidate Charles Taylor would return to war if defeated.

On 1 April 2009, it merged into the ruling Unity Party.
