= Samuel Doe =

Leader of Liberia from 1980 to 1990

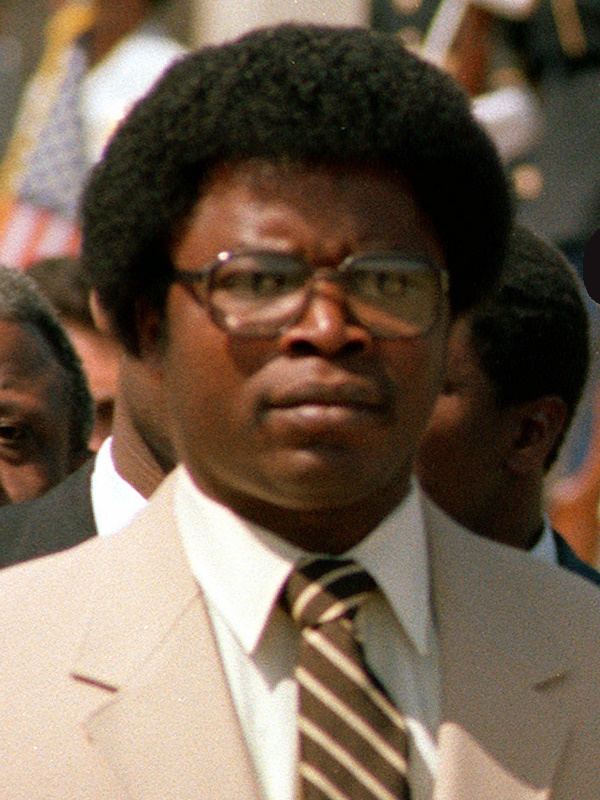
- Doe in 1982

21st President of Liberia
- In office 2 January 1986 – 9 September 1990
- Vice President: Harry Moniba
- Preceded by: Himself (as Chairman of People's Redemption Council)
- Succeeded by: Amos Sawyer (interim)

Chairman of the People's Redemption Council
- In office 12 April 1980 – 6 January 1986
- Deputy: Thomas Weh Syen; Nicholas Podier
- Preceded by: William Tolbert (as President)
- Succeeded by: Himself (as President)

Personal details
- Born: 6 May 1951 Tuzon, Liberia
- Died: 9 September 1990 (aged 39) Monrovia, Liberia
- Cause of death: Assassination
- Party: National Democratic Party
- Spouse: Nancy Doe (m. 1968)
- Children: 5
- Education: University of Liberia
- Occupation: Politician

Military service
- Allegiance: Liberia
- Branch/service: Armed Forces of Liberia
- Years of service: 1969–1985
- Rank: Master Sergeant (pre coup); General (post coup)
- Battles/wars: First Liberian Civil War

Samuel Kanyon Doe (6 May 1951 – 9 September 1990) was a Liberian politician and military officer who served as the 21st President of Liberia from 1986 until his execution in 1990. He ruled Liberia as Chairman of the People's Redemption Council (PRC) from 1980 to 1986 and then as the first native president from 1986 to 1990.

A member of the Krahn ethnic group, Doe was a master sergeant in the Armed Forces of Liberia (AFL) when he staged the violent 1980 coup d'état that overthrew President William Tolbert and the True Whig Party, becoming the first indigenous leader of Liberia and ending 133 years of Americo-Liberian rule. Doe suspended the Constitution of Liberia, assumed the rank of general, and established the PRC as a provisional military government with himself as de facto head of state.

Doe dissolved the PRC in 1984 and attempted to legitimize his regime, with a new democratic constitution and a general election held in 1985. He won with 51% of the votes, but the election had widespread allegations of election fraud. Doe opened Liberian ports to Canadian, Chinese, and European ships, which brought in considerable foreign investment and earned Liberia's reputation as a tax haven. Doe had support from the United States due to his anti-Soviet stance during the Cold War.

Doe's rule was characterized by authoritarianism, corruption, favoritism towards fellow Krahns, and persecution of the Dan and Mano tribes, particularly after surviving a coup attempt in 1985, which led to growing opposition to his regime from the Liberian public and the United States. The First Liberian Civil War began in December 1989 when the anti-Doe National Patriotic Front of Liberia (NPFL) led by Charles Taylor invaded Liberia from the Ivory Coast to overthrow him. The following year, Doe was captured and executed by the Independent National Patriotic Front of Liberia (INPFL), an NPFL splinter group led by Prince Johnson.

== Early life ==
Samuel Kanyon Doe was born on 6 May 1951 in Tuzon, a small inland village in Grand Gedeh County. His family belonged to the Krahn people, an important minority indigenous group in this area. At the age of sixteen, Doe finished elementary school and enrolled at a Baptist junior high school in Zwedru. Two years later, he enlisted in the Armed Forces of Liberia, hoping thereby to obtain a scholarship to a high school in Kakata. Instead, he was assigned to military duties.

Over the next ten years, he was assigned to duty stations, including education at a military school and commanding garrisons and prisons in Monrovia. He finally completed high school by correspondence. on 11 October 1979, Doe was promoted to master sergeant and made an administrator for the Third Battalion in Monrovia, a position he occupied for eleven months.

== 1980 coup d'etat and new government ==
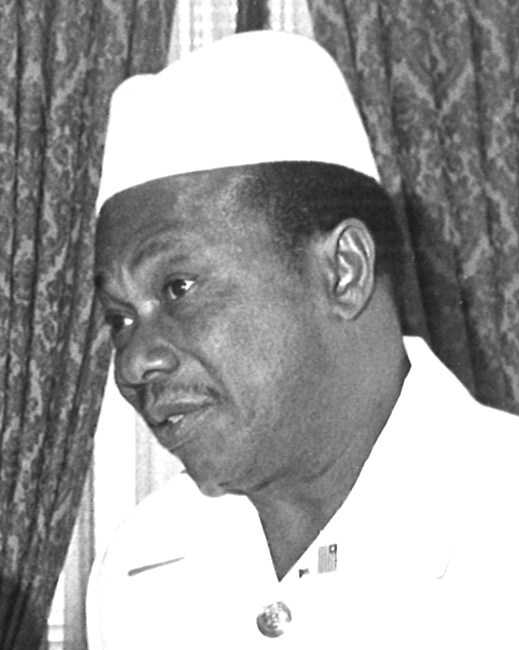
President William Tolbert

On 12 April 1980, commanding a group of Krahn soldiers, Doe led a military coup by attacking the Liberian Executive Mansion and killing President William Tolbert. His forces killed another 26 of Tolbert's supporters in the fighting. Thirteen members of the Cabinet were publicly executed ten days later. Shortly after the coup, government ministers were walked publicly around Monrovia in the nude and then summarily executed by a firing squad on the beach. The convicted were denied the right to a lawyer or any appeal. Hundreds of government workers fled the country, while others were imprisoned.

After the coup, Doe assumed the rank of general and established a People's Redemption Council (PRC), composed of himself and 14 other low-ranking officers, to rule the country. The early days of the regime were marked by mass executions of members of Tolbert's deposed government. Doe ordered the release of about 50 leaders of the opposition Progressive People's Party, who had been jailed by Tolbert during the rice riots of the previous month.

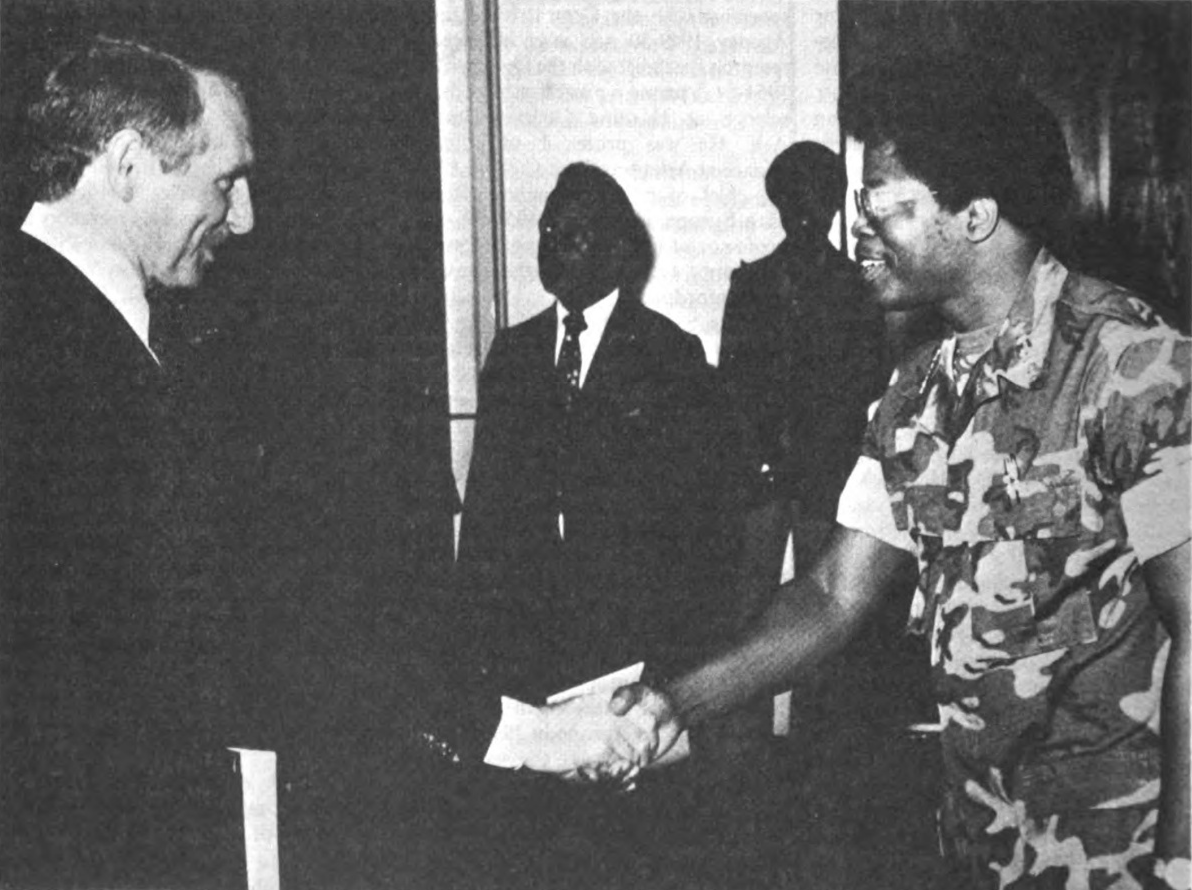
The U.S. Ambassador to Liberia William L. Swing presenting credentials to Doe, 1981

Shortly after that, Doe ordered the arrest of 91 officials of the Tolbert regime. Within days, eleven former members of Tolbert's cabinet, including his brother Frank, were brought to trial to answer charges of "high treason, rampant corruption and gross violation of human rights." Doe suspended the Constitution, allowing these trials to be conducted by a Commission appointed by the state's new military leadership, with defendants being refused both legal representation and trial by jury, virtually ensuring their conviction.

Doe abruptly ended 133 years of Americo-Liberian political domination. Though some hailed the coup as the first time since Liberia's establishment as a country that it was governed by people of native African descent instead of by the Americo-Liberian elite, other persons without Americo-Liberian heritage had held the Vice Presidency (Henry Too Wesley), as well as Ministerial and Legislative positions in years prior. Many people welcomed Doe's takeover as a shift favoring the majority of the population that had largely been excluded from government participation since the country's establishment.

However, the new government, led by the leaders of the coup d'état and calling itself the People's Redemption Council (PRC), lacked governing experience and a coherent ideological program. The PRC was composed largely of noncommissioned officers with limited administrative background and initially relied on civilian technocrats and opposition figures to manage state affairs. Doe became head of state and suspended the constitution, while promising a return to civilian rule by 1985.

In the first alleged plot against his government, nine military personnel arrested two months after the original 1980 coup were reportedly jailed for life.

In June 1981, his government denounced another alleged coup in which thirteen members were executed behind closed doors.

Months later, Thomas Weh Syen, an outspoken critic of some of Doe's policies, including the closure months before of the Libyan diplomatic mission and the forced reduction of staff from fifteen to six at the Soviet embassy, was beaten and arrested on 12 August of that same year, along with four other officers. They were promised a defense attorney, but none was given, and in three days, they were executed, which caused panic among the citizens of the capital.

=== Conjectures on the genesis of the coup ===
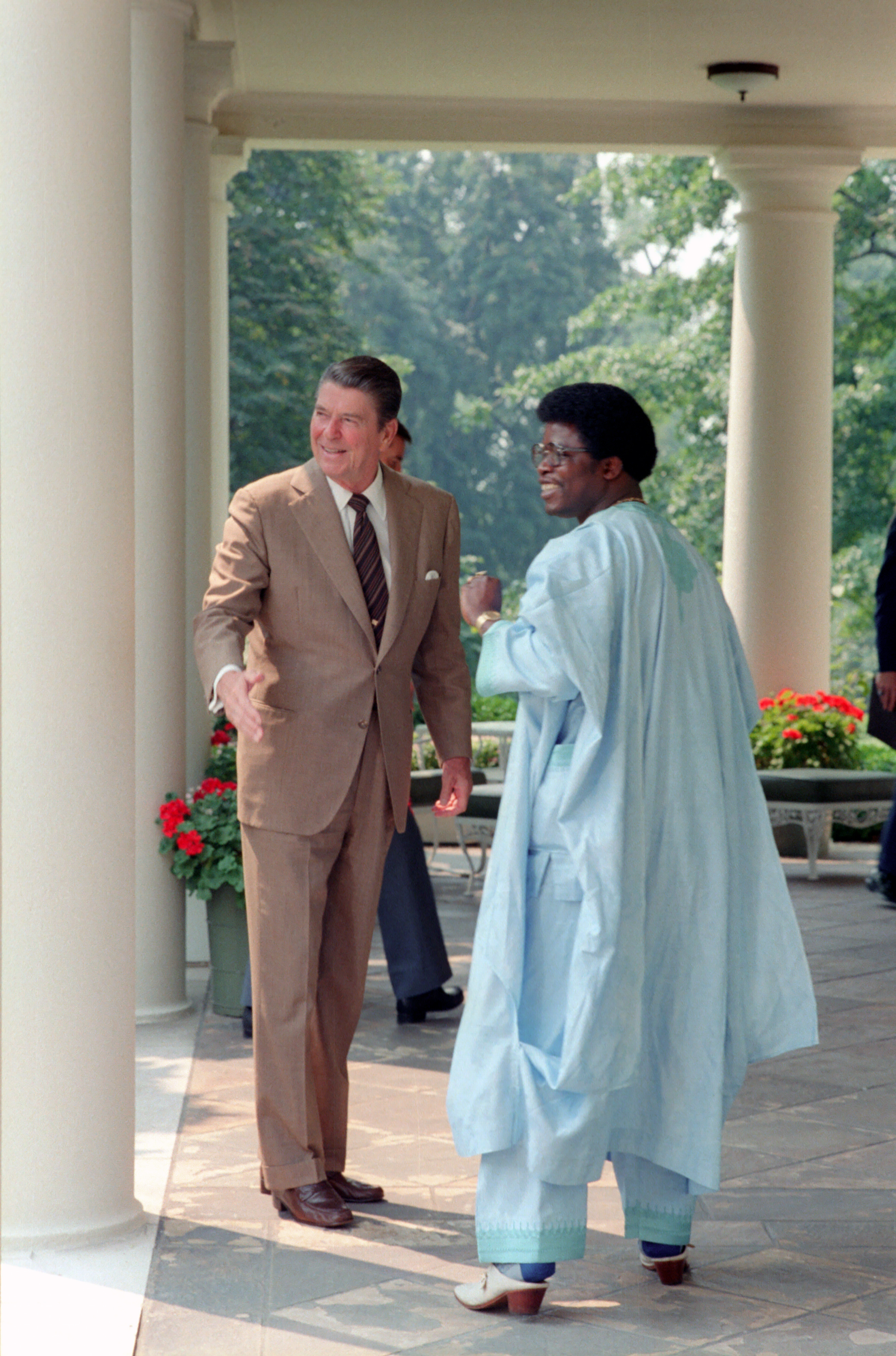
Doe with U.S. President Ronald Reagan in 1982

In August 2008, before a Truth and Reconciliation Commission (TRC) in Monrovia, Doe's former justice minister, Councillor Chea Cheapoo — who contested the 2011 Liberia Presidential elections — alleged the American CIA had provided a map of the Executive Mansion, enabling the rebels to break into it; that it was a white American CIA agent who shot and killed Tolbert; and that the Americans "were responsible for Liberia's nightmare". However, the next day, before the same TRC, another former minister of Samuel Doe, Dr. Boima Fahnbulleh, testified that "the Americans did not support the coup led by Mr. Doe".

Some facts of the 1980 coup are still clouded by reports of an "Unknown Soldier". It is reported that an "unknown soldier" was one of the "white" mercenaries who would have staged the 1980 military takeover of the state. According to the autobiography of Tolbert's wife Victoria, the First Lady witnessed a masked man with a "white" hand stabbing her late husband.

== Presidency ==
In the initial years of military rule, the PRC functioned as both the executive and legislative authority of the Liberian state. Although civilian ministers were appointed to manage government departments, ultimate decision-making power remained concentrated within the PRC, whose members exercised oversight through standing committees that supervised the civil service and cabinet. This governing structure limited the independence of civilian officials and ensured that authority remained firmly in the hands of the military leadership.

During his rule, Doe portrayed himself as an enlightened leader whose actions were intended to bring "relief to many". He styled himself "Dr. Doe" starting in 1982 after making a state visit to Chun Doo-hwan in South Korea and being awarded an honorary doctorate from the Seoul National University. After seven years of calling himself a doctor, Doe announced in 1989 that he had completed a bachelor's degree from the University of Liberia; his claim of holding a bachelor's degree has never been verified.

=== Relations with the United States ===
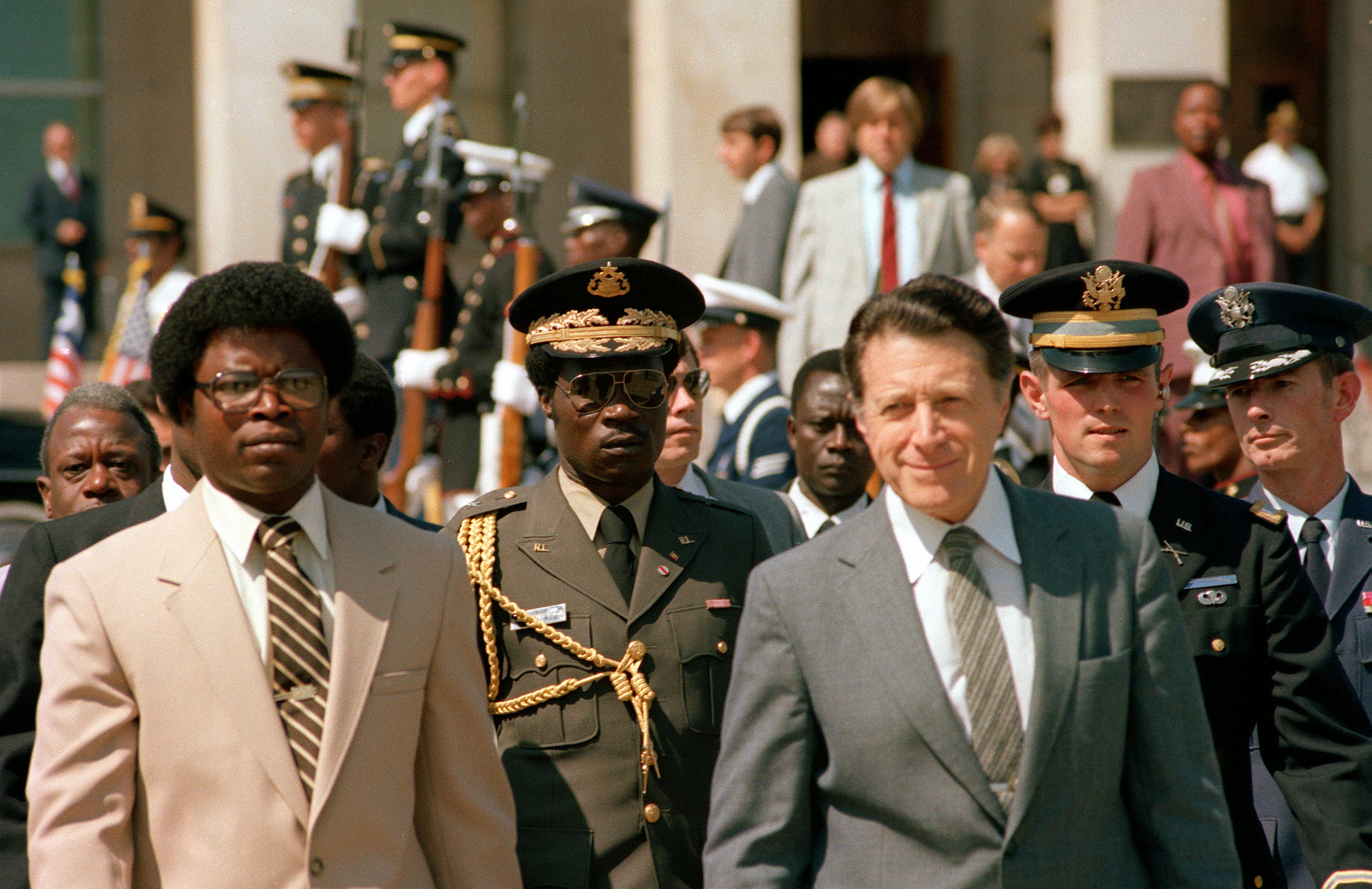
Doe with U.S. Secretary of Defense Caspar Weinberger outside the Pentagon in 1982

During his first years in office, Doe openly supported U.S. Cold War foreign policy in Africa during the 1980s, severing diplomatic relations between Liberia and the Soviet Union.

The United States valued Liberia as an important ally during the Cold War, as it helped to contain the spread of Soviet influence in Africa. As part of the expanding relationship, Doe agreed to a modification of the mutual defense pact granting staging rights on 24-hour notice at Liberia's sea and airports for the U.S. Rapid Deployment Force (RDF), which were established to respond swiftly to security threats around the world.

=== New constitution and 1985 elections ===
A draft constitution providing for a multi-party republic was issued in 1983 and approved by referendum in 1984. On 26 July 1984, Doe was elected President of the Interim National Assembly. He had a new constitution approved by referendum in 1984 and went on to stage a presidential election on 15 October 1985. According to official figures, Doe won 51% of the vote—just enough to avoid a runoff. The NDPL won 21 of the 26 Senate seats and 51 of the 64 seats in the House of Representatives. However, most of the elected opposition candidates refused to take their seats.

The election was heavily rigged. Doe had the ballots taken to a secret location, and 50 of his own handpicked staff counted them. Foreign observers declared the elections fraudulent and suggested that runner-up Jackson Doe (not related) of the Liberian Action Party had won. Before the election, Doe had more than 50 of his political opponents murdered. It is also alleged that he changed his official birth date from 1951 to 1950 to meet the new constitution's requirement that the president be at least 35 years old.

Doe was formally sworn in on 6 January 1986. His inauguration was accompanied by a celebration in the Barclay Training Center, which featured a mass gymnastic demonstration performed by local schoolchildren and a military parade.

Doe publicly declared that if he lost the elections, he would not hand over power, and the army would carry out another coup in less than two weeks. This position was harshly criticized by the international community and the political parties participating in the elections. Official results showed that Doe received a narrow majority of the votes in the elections, although the US State Department alleged widespread fraud.

=== Increased repression ===
Student activism was also subjected to increased pressure during the early years of military rule. Students at the University of Liberia, particularly leaders of the Liberian National Students Union, were among the earliest civilian groups to criticize the PRC and were met with arrests, intimidation, and restrictions on political activity in the period following the 1980 coup. The government also expanded the use of military tribunals and preventive detention, further restricting political activity in the period leading up to the 1985 elections.

General Thomas Quiwonkpa, who had been a leader of the 1980 coup along with Doe, attempted to seize power on 12 November 1985. The attempt failed after fighting in Monrovia, in which Quiwonkpa was killed. Doe announced in a radio and television broadcast that anyone found on the streets after a 6 p.m. curfew would be considered a rebel and executed immediately.

Doe's government became even more repressive after the attempted coup, shutting down newspapers and banning political activity. The government's mistreatment of certain ethnic groups, particularly the Dan and the Mano in the north (Quiwonkpa was an ethnic Dan), resulted in divisions and violence among indigenous populations who until then had coexisted peacefully.

== Civil war ==
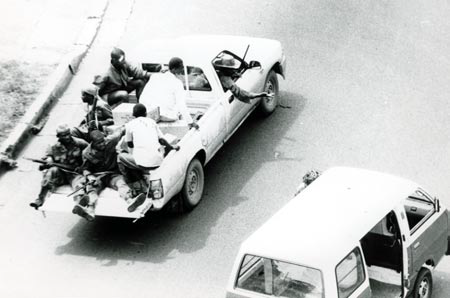
Insurgent forces in 1990 in Mamba Station

By the late 1980s, Doe’s government faced mounting internal weaknesses stemming from political repression, economic collapse, and deep divisions within the armed forces. Repeated purges and the politicization of the military eroded cohesion and effectiveness, while the marginalization of rival ethnic groups reduced the regime’s ability to mobilize national support. These conditions left the government poorly equipped to respond when insurgent forces launched an armed challenge in late 1989.

Charles Taylor, a former ally of Doe, crossed into Liberia from Ivory Coast on 24 December 1989 to wage a guerrilla war against Doe. Taylor had broken out of a jail in the United States, where he was awaiting extradition to Liberia on charges of embezzlement. The conflict quickly flared into full-fledged civil war. By June 1990, most of Liberia was controlled by rebel factions.

=== Monrovia Church massacre ===
Approximately 600 civilians were killed at the church in the Sinkor section of Monrovia on 29 July 1990. The massacre was carried out by approximately 30 government soldiers loyal to Doe. The perpetrators were of Doe's Krahn tribe, while most of the victims were from the Dan and Mano tribes, which were in support of the rebels.

== Capture and murder ==
Doe was captured in Monrovia on 9 September 1990 by Prince Johnson, leader of the Independent National Patriotic Front of Liberia (INPFL), a breakaway faction of Taylor's National Patriotic Front of Liberia (NPFL). General Arnold Quainoo, the head of ECOMOG, had invited Doe to the ECOMOG headquarters for a meeting and assured him of his safety from the rebels. On the morning of 9 September 1990, Doe arrived at a precarious time during an ongoing change in guard duty from the well-armed and better equipped Nigerian team of peacekeepers to the weaker Gambian contingent.

The Nigerian team had just withdrawn from the scene when Doe's convoy of lightly armed personnel arrived. Doe was escorted to General Quainoo's office, where he was formally welcomed while most of his team of aides and guards waited outside. Johnson's rebels surprised everyone by suddenly arriving on the scene uninvited and heavily armed, overwhelming and disarming all of Doe's team while encountering no resistance.

They then started shooting Doe's team individually and later in groups. Upon hearing the gunshots from outside, Doe expressed concern to Quainoo, who assured him everything was fine. Quainoo later excused himself to check on what was happening outside and was followed by his aide, Captain Coker of the Gambian contingent. Both men took cover upon assessing the situation. Johnson's men moved indoors, finished off Doe's remaining team, shot Doe in the leg, and took him captive.

Doe was taken to Johnson's military base. To prove that he was not protected by black magic, Johnson ordered Doe's ears be cut off in his presence. Shackles were placed around Doe's legs and something unknown was tied around his glans, visible in a recording. At the end of it, Doe can be seen forced to get up. Some of his fingers and toes were amputated, and there were attempts to mutilate his middle finger. After 12 hours of torture at Johnson's hands, Doe was murdered.

His corpse had its head shaved and was exhibited naked in the streets of Monrovia with cigarette burns. Doe's body was later exhumed and reburied. The spectacle of his torture was video-taped and seen on news reports around the country. The video shows Johnson sitting back in his chair at his desk calm and collected while sipping a can of beer and speaking at times while looking upon the torture of Doe.

== Personal life ==
Doe was a Baptist. At one time, he was a member of the First Baptist Church in the town of Zwedru in Grand Gedeh County, where he maintained a large farm until he assumed the presidency. He changed his church membership to the Providence Baptist Church of Monrovia on 1 December 1985. Doe was a passionate football fan, and the Samuel Kanyon Doe Sports Complex bears his name.

== Posterity ==
In November 2000, at a religious rally representing the Doe family, Doe's son Samuel Kanyon Doe Jr., accompanied by his mother Nancy, Doe's widow, told a conference that he had feelings of hatred and resentment against "a certain person in particular", and thoughts of revenge against his father's murderer for the past ten years and that he intended to cleanse his sins and feelings of hatred and revenge against his father's executioner. Both parties were reconciled at the hand of the Nigerian pastor TB Joshua.

Military offices
New creation	Chairman of the People's Redemption Council; 12 April 1980 – 6 January 1986	Office abolished
Government offices
Preceded by William Tolbert	President of Liberia; 6 January 1986 – 9 September 1990	Succeeded by Amos Sawyer as President of the Interim Government
