= Amos Sawyer =

Interim president of Liberia from 1990 to 1994

Amos Claudius Sawyer
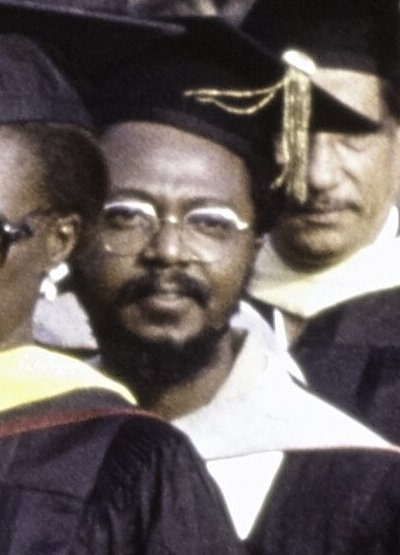
- Sawyer in 1978

Interim President of Liberia
- In office 22 November 1990 – 7 March 1994
- Vice President: Roland Diggs (1990–1991); Peter Naigow (1991); Vacant (1991–1994)
- Preceded by: Samuel Doe
- Succeeded by: David D. Kpormakpor

Personal details
- Born: 15 June 1945 Sinoe County, Liberia
- Died: 16 February 2022 (aged 76) Baltimore, Maryland, U.S.
- Party: Liberian People's Party

Amos Claudius Sawyer (15 June 1945 – 16 February 2022) was a Liberian politician and academic who served as interim president of Liberia from 22 November 1990 to 7 March 1994. He was voted into office by 35 leaders representing seven political parties and eleven interest groups.

== Biography ==
Amos Claudius Sawyer was born in 1945 to Abel and Sarah Sawyer; his siblings include Joe Sawyer. The Sawyers were a prominent family in Sinoe County, with free African-American ancestors who came as colonists to what was called "Maryland in Africa", founded by the Maryland Colonization Society. The colony became independent as the Republic of Maryland before joining Liberia in 1857.

Sawyer was educated in local schools and was a 1966 graduate of Liberia College (now the University of Liberia). He traveled to the United States for graduate work, earning M.A. and Ph.D. degrees in political science from Northwestern University in metropolitan Chicago, Illinois.

After his return, Dr. Sawyer worked as an academic, but also became an activist and politician. He ran for the position of Mayor of Monrovia, the capital, as an independent rather than within the True Whig Party. The latter had dominated the country for more than 100 years.

After the 1980 coup d'état, Sawyer returned to academia for a time, taking a position as a professor of political science at the University of Liberia. In December 1980, he was appointed dean of the College of Social Sciences and acting director of the university.

He was a founding member of the Movement for Justice in Africa (MOJA) and in 1983 founded the Liberian People's Party. In the period after the abduction (and eventual murder) of president Samuel Doe, from 9 September 1990 until 22 November 1990, principal mutineer Prince Johnson and co-conspirator Charles Taylor both made claims on the presidency. In late August an emergency conference was held in the Gambia by a delegation of 35 Liberians representing seven political parties and eleven interest groups. They voted Sawyer as interim president and Bishop Roland Diggs as vice-president, to establish a government.

In 1992, Sawyer wrote The Emergence of Autocracy in Liberia: Tragedy and Challenge, in this book, he depicts how dictatorial control rose up out of a custom of patrimonial power, with the privileges of administration tirelessly brought together and amassed in the possession of progressive presidents. This example of absolutism, which was not in itself oppressive, finished in the military tyranny.

Such leaders extended Sawyer's one-year appointment for four years during the civil war fought against rebels led largely by Taylor, Johnson, and David Nimley. In 1994, Sawyer was forced to step down as a part of the peace process, and subsequently the role of official leader of Liberia was held not by the president, but by the chairmen of the Council of State. Fighting sparked again in 1996, and continued during Charles Taylor's presidency from 1997 to 2003.

Sawyer returned to the US for a period, invited to serve as associate director and research scholar at the Workshop in Political Theory and Policy Analysis in the Department of Political Science at Indiana University in Bloomington, Indiana.

Sawyer was chairman of the Governance Reform Commission in Liberia, which has recently become the Governance Commission. His book, Beyond Plunder: Toward Democratic Governance in Liberia (2005), explored the development of multi-party democracy in the country. He supported Ellen Johnson Sirleaf in the October 2005 and 2011 elections.

== Personal life and death ==
Sawyer died at the Johns Hopkins Hospital in Baltimore, Maryland, on 16 February 2022, at the age of 76.

== Legacy and honors ==
- Sawyer was awarded the Gusi Peace Prize in 2011.

Preceded by Samuel Doe	President of the Interim Government of National Unity; 1990–1994	Succeeded by David D. Kpormakor
