= People's Redemption Council =

1980–1984 military government of Liberia

Republic of Liberia
- 1980–1990
- Flag Coat of arms
- Motto: "The Love of Liberty Brought Us Here"
- Anthem: "All Hail, Liberia, Hail!"
- Location of People's Redemption Council (dark green)
- Capital: Monrovia
- Government: Military junta (1980-1984); Unitary presidential republic under an authoritarian (Note: Has been described as totalitarian or authoritarian by multiple sources.) dictatorship (1984-1990)
- President
  - 1980–1990: Samuel Doe
- History
  - Coup d'Etat: 12 April 1980
  - Referendum: 3 July 1984
  - Doe's death: 9 September 1990
- ISO 3166 code: LR

The People's Redemption Council (PRC) was a military junta that ruled Liberia from 1980 to 1984. It was established after the 1980 Liberian coup d'état wherein Samuel Doe seized power on 12 April 1980. The Council, with Doe as its chairman, promised a complete overhaul of Liberia's society, economy, and political system and the replacement of the corruption of previous regimes with respect for the rights of the Liberian people. The PRC had 17 founding members and was later expanded to 28. The PRC initially functioned as the executive and legislative body in Doe's government. However, over time Doe consolidated power as a central executive. In 1984, the PRC was dissolved and replaced by the Interim National Assembly.

== History ==
=== Context ===
Since 1847, Liberia operated as an independent nation with a constitutional system modeled on that of the United States. For a long portion of its history, its government was dominated by Americo-Liberians, a group of free people of color and freed slaves from the United States and their descendants who first established Liberia in 1822 as a colony of the American Colonization Society, a private philanthropic organization based in Washington, D.C. and led by a number of leading American statesmen. From Liberia's independence until the coup that gave rise to the PRC, the Americo-Liberians controlled nearly every aspect of Liberian political and social life, eventually creating a strict one-party system organized around the True Whig Party. After the death of long-serving President William Tubman in 1971, William Tolbert, Jr., became president. Tolbert's administration, like his predecessor's, was characterized by political suppression, a government dominated by the executive, and a continuation of the True Whig Party's unquestioned control of the Liberian political sphere. In 1979, civil discord rose to an all-time high due to a 50% increase in rice prices, resulting in the deaths of dozens of Liberians in what became known as the Rice Riots of 1979. Public disaffection continued with Tolbert's decision to host the 1979 Organization of African Unity annual summit in Monrovia, building a state-of-the-art conference center and hotel specifically for the event at a cost of more than USD$25 million. In addition to an overall lack of development and a stagnant economy, this unrest precipitated the 1980 Liberian coup d'état that would lead to the creation of the PRC.

=== Inception and operation ===
On 12 April 1980, Samuel K. Doe led a group of 17 soldiers in a coup d'état that overthrew and killed then-president William Tolbert. By 16 April 1980, Doe's forces were able to begin consolidating power. The group formed the People's Redemption Council as the supreme legislative and executive power with Doe as its chairman. In the wake of the coup, the PRC emphasized a goal of creating a new system of governance and societal organization rooted in support of the country's commoners. Doe, as a native Liberian, claimed to be seeking equality of rights and status among all Liberians.

Shortly after its formation, the PRC authorized the arrest of over 100 former government officials from the Tolbert administration. Several of them were brutally beaten and executed in the weeks following the coup.

In its first fiscal year, the PRC increased military spending by 150%, which critics used to question the body's commitment to a transition towards democracy. By early 1981, Liberian debt had nearly reached $800 million. Under the PRC, Liberia's economy remained dependent on income from abroad. In mid-1981, the PRC created the National Constitutional Commission (NCC), the Constitutional Advisory Assembly (CAA), and Special Elections Commission (SEC) to, respectively, write a new constitution, revise the newly drafted constitution, and run democratic elections.

Shortly after its founding, Doe and the PRC increased the size of the body. Three of these new members were former officials from the Tolbert administration. Over time, conflict between military and civilian members led to division between progressives and conservatives, especially along ethnic lines. Some PRC members criticized their fellow councilmen for engaging in the very corruption that they publicly disavowed. In 1982, Doe and military PRC members executed several civilian PRC members who opposed them, which effectively ended the intra-council conflict.

=== International response ===
After the coup, the United States, the Organisation of African Unity, and the West African Economic Community criticized Doe and the PRC. Additionally, the International Monetary Fund and the World Bank restricted loan terms offered to Liberia under the PRC.

=== Transition and disbandment ===
By December 1982, the NCC had completed its task of drafting a constitution. Despite disagreements between the PRC and the NCC concerning the timeline of a transition, the NCC's draft was submitted to the CAA for revision. After their revisions were completed in late 1983, a referendum took place on 3 July 1984, that ratified the constitution.

With the ratification of the new constitution in 1984, the PRC was dissolved and replaced with the Interim National Assembly (INA) on 22 July 1984.

== Composition ==
At its inception, the PRC consisted of 17 soldiers. The PRC quickly grew to include a handful of civilians and several high-ranking members of the previous administration, bringing the PRC's total membership to 28. The PRC was mainly made up of native Liberians and the majority of PRC members were Krahn, similarly to Doe, with a large number of members hailing from the same county as Doe.

== Powers ==
Immediately after the coup, the PRC prohibited organized opposition, dissolved the Legislature of Liberia, and suspended the Constitution, leaving the PRC as the sole executive and legislative body in the national government.

However, despite this consolidation of authority, Doe quickly consolidated executive and legislative power, effectively making the PRC a de facto cabinet rather than a body with powers of its own. Doe preserved his power through clientelism involving the army and by threat/use of force towards his opposition, including within the PRC itself.

== Legacy ==
Immediately after the PRC was disbanded, many of its members pursued positions of authority in the new government. Doe would win election as president in a highly contested and controversial election as the nominee of the National Democratic Party of Liberia. Many former PRC members then became members of Doe's presidential cabinet.

While the PRC ruled formally by decree, its decisions and amendments to Liberian law would continue in effect unless and until a successor body rescinded them. Under the new constitution, Article 97, referred to by some as "transitional provisions", provided no action taken by the PRC "shall be questioned in any proceedings whatsoever" and prevented any court or tribunal from hearing any case pertaining to the 1980 coup, the suspension of the prior constitution, the establishment and actions of the PRC, or any legal decisions made or penalties imposed by the PRC.

Colonist-native ethnic tension in Liberia had been prevalent since the arrival of the Americo-Liberians in the early 1800s. Doe's favoritism towards the Krahn people increased tensions by encouraging boundaries and status differences among native Liberian ethnic groups. These differences led to sometimes violent relationships with the Gio and Mano peoples.

Under Doe and the PRC, poor nutrition, lack of access to drinking water, unemployment, and rising violent crime rates characterized life in Liberia. In the political sphere, political imprisonment was high and political discourse was suppressed.

== See also ==
- History of Liberia
