= List of elections in 1927 =

The following elections occurred in the year 1927.

- 1927 Bolivian legislative election
- 1927 Chilean presidential election
- 1927 Dominican Republic Constitutional Assembly election
- 1927 Finnish parliamentary election
- 1927 Guatemalan Constitutional Convention election
- 1927 Lebanese general election
- 1927 Liberian general election
- 1927 Liberian constitutional referendum
- 1927 Nicaraguan parliamentary election
- 1927 Norwegian parliamentary election
- 1927 Salvadoran presidential election

== Asia ==
- Dutch East Indies Volksraad election
- Soviet Union legislative election
- Turkish general election
- Turkish presidential election

== Europe ==
- Austrian legislative election
- Czechoslovak presidential election
- Free City of Danzig parliamentary election
- Germany:
  - Brunswick Landtag election
  - Hamburg state election
- Bulgarian parliamentary election
- Finnish parliamentary election
- Icelandic parliamentary election
- Ireland:
  - June 1927 Irish general election
  - September 1927 Irish general election
  - 1927 Dublin County by-election
  - 1927 Dublin South by-election
- Kingdom of Serbs, Croats and Slovenes parliamentary election
- Latvian presidential election
- Liechtenstein:
  - 1927 Liechtenstein local elections
  - 1927 Liechtenstein referendums
- Maltese general election
- Norwegian parliamentary election
- Romanian general election
- Soviet Union legislative election
- 1927 Swiss referendum
- Turkish general election
- Turkish presidential election
- Zagreb local elections

=== United Kingdom ===
- 1927 Bosworth by-election
- Brixton by-election
- Canterbury by-election
- 1927 Combined Scottish Universities by-election
- 1927 Leith by-election
- 1927 Southend by-election
- 1927 Southwark North by-election
- 1927 Stourbridge by-election
- 1927 Westbury by-election

== North America ==
=== Canada ===
- 1927 Edmonton municipal election
- 1927 Manitoba general election
- 1927 Prince Edward Island general election
- 1927 Quebec general election
- 1927 Toronto municipal election

=== United States ===
- 1927 New York state election

==== United States gubernatorial ====
- 1927 Kentucky gubernatorial election
- 1927 Mississippi gubernatorial election
- 1927 United States gubernatorial elections

==== United States House of Representatives ====
- 1927 United States House of Representatives elections
- 1927 New York's 35th congressional district special election

==== United States mayoral elections ====
- 1927 Baltimore mayoral election
- 1927 Chicago mayoral election
- 1927 Manchester, New Hampshire mayoral election
- 1927 Philadelphia mayoral election
- 1927 San Diego mayoral election
- 1927 San Francisco mayoral election

== Oceania ==
=== Australia ===
- 1927 Dalley by-election
- 1927 New South Wales state election
- 1927 South Australian state election
- 1927 Victorian state election
- 1927 Warringah by-election
- 1927 Western Australian state election

=== New Zealand ===
- 1927 Raglan by-election

== See also ==
- Category:1927 elections
