= 2007 in Liberia =

- Decades: 1980s; 1990s; 2000s; 2010s; 2020s
- See also: Other events of 2007; Timeline of Liberian history

Events in the year 2007 in Liberia.

== Incumbents ==
- President: Ellen Johnson Sirleaf
- Vice President: Joseph Boakai
- Chief Justice: Johnnie Lewis

== Events ==
- January 18 – Edwin Snowe, the speaker of the House of Representatives, is sacked following vote of no confidence.
- February 26 – President Sirleaf announces the resignation of acting minister of state for presidential affairs Willis Knuckles due to a sex scandal.
- June 4 – The trial of former President Charles McArthur Ghankay Taylor, begins at The Hague.
- July 12 – The government submits a bill to the legislature to allow the seizure of the assets of Charles G. Taylor, his relatives and associates.
- July 24 – A run-off by-election is held in Grand Bassa County's 3rd House district, which would be won by Liberty Party nominee Jeh Byron Browne.
- December 18 – A run-off Senate by-election is held in Gbarpolu County, which would be won by Unity Party nominee J. S. B. Theodore Momo.

== Deaths ==
- April 3 – Margaret Tor-Thompson, 44, politician.
- September 7 –
  - Joseph Rudolph Grimes, 84, foreign minister (1960–1972).
  - Gabriel Baccus Matthews, 59, foreign minister (1980–1981, 1990–1993).
- September 9 – Angie Brooks, 78, diplomat and jurist.
