= 2020 in Liberia =

- Decades: 2000s; 2010s; 2020s
- See also: Other events of 2020; Timeline of Liberian history

Events in the year 2020 in Liberia.

== Incumbents ==
- President: George Weah
- Vice President: Jewel Taylor
- Chief Justice: Francis S. Korkpor, Sr.

== Events ==
- March 16 – The first case of COVID-19 in the country was confirmed. The person, a government official, had traveled from Switzerland.
- April 4 – The first COVID-19 death in the country is reported.
- April 8 – President George Weah declared lock-down measures to take effect on April 10 and last for 3 weeks, including suspension of all non-essential travel and curfews. Schools were closed across the country, and churches, mosques, bars, and beaches in parts of the country.
- December 8
  - 2020 Liberian constitutional referendum: Voters must decide on two Constitutional amendments: one to shorten the President's term in office, and the other to reverse the ban on dual nationality.
  - 2020 Liberian Senate election
- December 28
  - The Collaborating Political Parties (CPP) calls for a rerun of the election in the Nimba County Senatorial Election.
  - The United States extends the Liberian Refugee Immigration Fairness program (LRIF) until December 20, 2021.

== Deaths ==
- June 21
  - Bill Horace, former warlord, shot in London, Ontario, Canada
  - Joseph Korto, Minister of Education (2006-2010), in Delaware, United States
- July 1 – J. Nagbe Sloh, member of the House of Representatives of Liberia, in Monrovia
- July 8 – Munah Pelham-Youngblood, member of the House of Representatives of Liberia, in Accra, Ghana (b. 1983)
- August 5 – Lahai Gbabye Lansanah, former Bomi County senator (b. 1968)
- September 16 – Chea Cheapoo, Chief Justice (1987), in New Georgia (b. 1942)
- April 4 – George Dweh, politician and warlord, Speaker of the National Transitional Legislative Assembly of Liberia (2003–2005) (b. 1961)

== See also ==
- COVID-19 pandemic in Africa
- COVID-19 pandemic in Liberia
