= 2022 in Liberia =

- Decades: 2000s; 2010s; 2020s
- See also: Other events of 2022; Timeline of Liberian history

Events in the year 2022 in Liberia.

== Incumbents ==
- President: George Weah
- Vice President: Jewel Taylor
- Chief Justice: Francis S. Korkpor, Sr. (until September 27), Sie-A-Nyene Yuoh

== Events ==
- January 20 – Twenty-nine people are killed during a stampede at an open-air Pentecostal church in Monrovia. The stampede was triggered by panic after gangsters entered the prayer ground after a collection.
- February 14 – The Executive Mansion is reopened after burning down on July 26, 2006, and President Weah moves into it.
- March 9 – Officials from Air France inform Transport Minister Samuel A. Wlue that the company plans to cease operations in Liberia effective April 2022, in an attempt to restore profitability.
- March 14 – Facia Boyenoh Harris, along with eleven other women, is awarded the 2022 International Women of Courage Award.
- June 8 – Liberia announces its intention to open a trade mission in Jerusalem, that is to become an Israeli embassy over time.
- July 22 – President George Weah signs an amendment to the 1973 Alien and Nationality Act which allows for dual citizenship.
- July 25 – Health Minister Wilhelmina Jallah announces the first confirmed case of monkeypox in the country since 2018.
- July 26 – Commerce Minister Mawine G. Diggs serves as national Independence Day orator.
- August 15 – Three Liberian officials, Minister of State Nathaniel McGill, Solicitor General Sayma Cyrennius Cephus, and National Port Authority head Bill Twehway, have sanctions imposed on them by the United States Department of Treasury for involvement in corruption.
- August 23 – Associate Justice Sie-A-Nyene Yuoh is nominated by President Weah to replace Francis Korkpor as chief justice upon his resignation in September.
- September 22 – Liberia establishes diplomatic relations with Jamaica.
- September 27 – Chief Justice Francis Korkpor announces his retirement.
- October 6 – United States Ambassador-at-Large for Global Criminal Justice Beth Van Schaack arrives in Liberia.

== Deaths ==
- January 18 – G. V. Kromah, former warlord and leader of the ULIMO (b. 1953)
- February 16 – Amos Sawyer, Interim President of Liberia, in Baltimore, Maryland, U. S. (b. 1945)
- April 22 – Walter Gwenigale, politician, minister of health and social welfare (b. 1935)
- August 12 – Lewis Jerome Zeigler, Roman Catholic prelate, in Monrovia (b. 1944)
- October 18 – Charles A. Clarke, politician (b. 1941)
- December 25 – Daniel E. Cassell, psychologist and politician

== See also ==
- COVID-19 pandemic in Africa
- Foreign relations of Liberia
