= 2020 Liberian by-elections =

The 2020 Liberian by-elections were held on December 8 in the following House districts: Montserrado-9 and Sinoe-2. The by-elections were held concurrently with the 2020 Senate election as well as a constitutional referendum. The by-elections were triggered by the deaths of two members of the House of Representatives. The by-elections were delayed beyond what is permitted by the Liberian Constitution. The elected House members were Frank Saah Foko Jr. (Montserrado-9) and Samson Wiah (Sinoe-2).

== Background ==
Sinoe-2 Representative J. Nagbe Sloh, a member of the ruling Coalition for Democratic Change (CDC), died on June 30, 2020. Munah Pelham-Youngblood, who represented Montserrado-9 and was also a member of the CDC, died on July 8. The Legislature of Liberia sent a notification of the vacancies in the House to the National Elections Commission (NEC) on September 10. By late September, the NEC had submitted a budget for the by-elections and the election date had been scheduled for December 8, to be held alongside the Senate election. The nomination period for the by-election was between October 5 and October 16.

For the CDC primary in Montserrado-9, eight candidates competed, with the winner being Frank Saah Foko Jr., special aide to the late Representative Pelham-Youngblood. He won with 882 votes, 48.82% of the total. The other candidates in Montserrado County were Fubbi Franklin Armah Henries of the Collaborating Political Parties (CPP), Saah Roberts of the Rainbow Alliance (RA), and Rahaile M. Foday of the Movement for One Liberia (MOL), as well as independent candidates former Paynesville Mayor Cyvette Gibson, B. Miller Catakaw, Edmond K. P. P. Lloyd, and James Salinsa Debbah.

There was conflict in the Sinoe-2 CDC primary election, with Primary Chairman Otis Seton accusing County Superintendent Lee Nagbe Chea of attempting to violate the primary process. Superintendent Chea denied Seton's allegations. The dispute was resolved on October 7, and Samson Wiah was declared winner of the primary. Wiah was supported by the late Representative Sloh's family. The other candidates in Sinoe County were Othello Doe Nagbe of the RA, Frederick Kpennie Call Jr. of the Liberia National Union (LINU), Jeremiah W. N. McCauley of the National Democratic Coalition (NDC), S. N. Sunny Doe of the People's Unification Party (PUP), S. Nagbe Jarteh II of the Liberia Transformation Party (LTP), Thomas Togba Koon of the MOL, and independent candidate Abraham Sarkpa Dennis.

By October 11, the CPP, the major opposition party, filed a writ of mandamus to Associate Justice Sie-A-Nyene Yuoh, summoning the NEC, the House of Representatives, and the Ministry of Justice to appear before Justice Youh on October 15. The writ was in regard to the conduct of the by-elections. The CPP claimed that the entities had violated the Constitution. This is because legislative by-elections in Liberia are constitutionally required to be held within a maximum 120 days after a vacancy is created. The House had sent its notification of vacancy to the NEC 72 days after the death of Sloh and 64 days after the death of Pelham-Youngblood. The Constitution states the House is to send a vacancy notification within 30 days of a vacancy's creation. The NEC, which has a duty to run by-elections within 90 days of being notified of a legislative vacancy, then set the date to December 8 to coincide with the Senate election, building off the House's illegal delay, argued the CPP. The CPP noted a history of illegally late by-elections ran by the NEC in 2018 and 2019. The CPP ultimately argued the by-elections must be held by October 28 in Sinoe County and November 5 in Montserrado County to fall within the constitutional time frame.

On October 28, the Supreme Court ruled that the NEC was in the right to set the by-election within 90 days of receiving the vacancy notification from the House, regardless of whether or not it was late. While the Court agreed that the House had violated the law by sending the notification late, the fact that it had already been sent before the CPP's filing meant the Court had nothing to compel the House to do. The House had already performed its duty in the by-election process. The Court ultimately allowed the by-elections to be held on December 8.

== Aftermath ==
The by-elections were held on December 8. By December 16, the winners had been declared: Foko in Montserrado and Wiah in Sinoe. Foko was certificated by the NEC on March 8, 2021, on the same day as senators James Biney and Numene Bartekwa. Wiah was certificated on April 6, 2021.

== Results ==
The following are the results for the 2020 by-elections from the NEC.

2020 Montserrado County 9th House District By-election
Candidate	Party	Votes	%
Frank Saah Foko Jr.	Coalition for Democratic Change	8,650	33.92
Fubbi Franklin Armah Henries	Collaborating Political Parties	8,542	33.50
Cyvette Gibson	Independent	3,211	12.59
B. Miller Catakaw	Independent	2,557	10.03
Edmond K. P. P. Lloyd	Independent	904	3.54
James Salinsa Debbah	Independent	753	2.95
Saah Roberts	Rainbow Alliance	597	2.34
Rahaile M. Foday	Movement for One Liberia	287	1.13
Total		25,501	100.00
Valid votes		25,501	96.79
Invalid/blank votes		845	3.21
Total votes		26,346	100.00
CDC hold			

2020 Sinoe County 2nd House District By-election
Candidate	Party	Votes	%
Samson Quejue Wiah	Coalition for Democratic Change	1,789	23.80
Othello Doe Nagbe	Rainbow Alliance	1,760	23.41
Frederick Kpennie Call Jr.	Liberia National Union	1,401	18.64
Abraham Sarkpa Dennis	Independent	1,361	18.11
Jeremiah W. N. McCauley	National Democratic Coalition	845	11.24
S. N. Sunny Doe	People's Unification Party	176	2.34
S. Nagbe Jarteh II	Liberia Transformation Party	160	2.13
Thomas Togba Koon	Movement for One Liberia	25	0.33
Total		7,517	100.00
Valid votes		7,517	93.56
Invalid/blank votes		517	6.44
Total votes		8,034	100.00
CDC hold			
