= 2008 in Liberia =

- Decades: 1980s; 1990s; 2000s; 2010s; 2020s
- See also: Other events of 2008; Timeline of Liberian history

Events in the year 2008 in Liberia.

== Incumbents ==
- President: Ellen Johnson Sirleaf
- Vice President: Joseph Boakai
- Chief Justice: Johnnie Lewis

== Events ==
- January 7 – The war crimes trial of the former President Charles Taylor resumes at The Hague.
- January 21 – The former warlord, Joshua Milton Blahyi, confesses to being responsible to at least 20,000 deaths during the First Liberian Civil War.
- February 26 – A run-off by-election is held in Margibi County's 4th House district, which would be won by Unity Party nominee Ballah Zayzay.
- June 1 – During a 2010 World Cup qualification match between Liberia and Gambia, at the Samuel K. Doe stadium, 8 people were suffocated.

== Deaths ==
- September 20 – Francis A. Dennis, diplomat (b. 1926).
