= Sinoe-2 =

Electoral district in Liberia

- Constituency for the House of Representatives of Liberia
- Electorate: 18,439 (2023)

Current constituency
- Representative: Samson Quejue Wiah

Sinoe-2 is an electoral district for the elections to the House of Representatives of Liberia. It is located in an eastern portion of Sinoe County, bordering Grand Gedeh, River Gee, and Grand Kru counties.

== Elected representatives ==
Year	Representative elected	Party	Notes
2005	James Timothy Davies	APD	
2011	Jeremiah W. N. McCauley Sr.	NDC	
2017	Jay Nagbe Sloh	UP	Died in office.
2020	Samson Quejue Wiah	CDC	
2023	Samson Quejue Wiah	CDC	
