= 2026 in Liberia =

- Decades: 2000s; 2010s; 2020s
- See also: Other events of 2026; Timeline of Liberian history

Events in the year 2026 in Liberia.

== Incumbents ==
- President: Joseph Boakai
- Vice President: Jeremiah Koung
- Chief Justice: Sie-A-Nyene Yuoh

== Events ==
=== January ===
- 2 January – Liberia assumes a two-year non-permanent seat at the United Nations Security Council, for the first time since 1961.

=== July ===
- 21 July – Authorities seize 3,971 kg (8,755 lb) of cocaine valued at US$317 million in Duazon as part of one of the country's largest reported drug seizures, with the shipment believed to have been destined for Europe. Two foreign nationals are arrested.

=== August ===
- 20 August –
  - The first 20 US deportees arrive in Monrovia under a new agreement with the US government that will send up to 1,200 migrants to the country, alongside US$124 million in assistance.
  - Former vice-president Jewel Taylor is detained at Roberts International Airport in Monrovia and charged with drug trafficking and money laundering in connection with a transnational cocaine-trafficking network.
- 31 August – Sweden officially ends its bilateral development aid programme to Liberia after 18 years; the embassy in Monrovia is scheduled to be fully wound down by 31 October.

== Holidays ==
- 1 January – New Year's Day
- 11 February – Armed Forces Day
- 12 March – Decoration Day
- 15 March – J.J. Roberts' Birthday
- 11 April – Fast and Prayer Day
- 14 May – National Unification Day
- 26 July – Independence Day
- 24–25 August – Flag Day
- 6 November – Thanksgiving
- 29 November – William V. S. Tubman's Birthday
- 25 December – Christmas Day

== Deaths ==
- 18 March – Nyan Dokpa, musician
- 6 September – Guus Kouwenhoven, 84, Dutch-born arms dealer (Second Liberian Civil War)

== See also ==
- Foreign relations of Liberia
