= Grand Bassa-1 =

Electoral district in Liberia

- Constituency for the House of Representatives of Liberia
- Electorate: 27,962 (2023)

Current constituency
- Representative: Isaac G. Bannie

Grand Bassa-1 is an electoral district for the elections to the House of Representatives of Liberia. It is located in an eastern portion of Grand Bassa County, bordering Margibi County.

== Elected representatives ==
Year	Representative elected	Party	Notes
2005	Samuel Dornaworlo Page, Sr.	LP	
2011	Hans Barchue	IND	
2017	Hans Barchue	IND	
2023	Isaac G. Bannie	MPC	

== Election results ==
2005 Grand Bassa County's 1st House District Election
Candidate	Party	Votes	%
Samuel Dornaworlo Page Sr.	Liberty Party	3,621	23.97
Austine Wreemongar Spiller	Coalition for the Transformation of Liberia	3,295	21.81
Trokon Hill	Independent	2,771	18.34
Jackie Clipton Smith	Progressive Democratic Party	1,935	12.81
Solomon Saynbarn Gray Sr.	Freedom Alliance Party of Liberia	1,338	8.86
Jerry Fineboy Zehyoue	National Reformation Party	897	5.94
Al William Greene	Congress for Democratic Change	806	5.34
Agathon Buelue Passawe	Unity Party	444	2.94
Total		15,107	100.00
Valid votes		15,107	95.43
Invalid/blank votes		724	4.57
Total votes		15,831	100.00

2011 Grand Bassa County's 1st House District Election
Candidate	Party	Votes	%
Hans Barchue	Independent	4,799	33.14
Austin Wreemongar Spiller	Unity Party	2,223	15.35
Samuel Dornaworlo Page Sr. (Incumbent)	Liberty Party	2,077	14.34
Wesley B. Robinson Sr.	Liberia Transformation Party	1,735	11.98
Joseph D. S. Boldar	Congress for Democratic Change	1,574	10.87
Summar Sarah Miller	Movement for Progressive Change	944	6.52
Joshua S. K. Washington	Grassroot Democratic Party of Liberia	402	2.78
Isaac Boy Narkinwhe	National Patriotic Party	363	2.51
Abraham Nyonyen Weeks	National Union for Democratic Progress	207	1.43
John Weayongar Weh	National Democratic Coalition	158	1.09
Total		14,482	100.00
Valid votes		14,482	92.00
Invalid/blank votes		1,260	8.00
Total votes		15,742	100.00

2017 Grand Bassa County's 1st House District Election
Candidate	Party	Votes	%
Hans Barchue (Incumbent)	Independent	8,922	47.80
Henrietta F. Martor	Unity Party	2,000	10.71
Isaac O. Ross	All Liberian Party	1,869	10.01
Tryphena G. M. Lloyd-Teah	Alternative National Congress	1,562	8.37
Samuel Dornaworlo Page Sr.	Movement for Progressive Change	764	4.09
Reuben T. Barnie	Redemption Democratic Congress	726	3.89
Augustus B. F. Swah Sr.	Vision for Liberia Transformation	512	2.74
Joseph Shavy Duo	People's Unification Party	382	2.05
Sheriff Ballah Massaquoi	Coalition for Democratic Change	346	1.85
Harris S. K. Darkpeh	Liberian People's Party	342	1.83
Solomon Grimes Davies	Liberia Transformation Party	306	1.64
Sarah Summar Miller	Coalition for Liberia's Progress	286	1.53
Etweda Ambavi Cooper	True Whig Party	273	1.46
Sophie N. K. Cleon	United People's Party	202	1.08
Charles Thayee Dueh	Liberians for Prosperity	105	0.56
Richard Momo Fahn	Movement for Economic Empowerment	69	0.37
Total		18,666	100.00
Valid votes		18,666	92.77
Invalid/blank votes		1,455	7.23
Total votes		20,121	100.00
