= 2021 in Liberia =

- Decades: 2000s; 2010s; 2020s
- See also: Other events of 2021; Timeline of Liberian history

Events in the year 2021 in Liberia.

== Incumbents ==
- President: George Weah
- Vice President: Jewel Taylor
- Chief Justice: Francis S. Korkpor, Sr.

== Events ==
- January 1 – The Faith Community Lutheran Church in the United States of America has selected Gbarnga, Bong County to host the second Lutheran University in Africa.
- January 7 – President George Weah attends the second inauguration of Ghanaian President Nana Akufo-Addo.
- January 20 – President Joe Biden sends a memorandum to the United States Department of State reinstating Deferred Enforced Departure (DED) to Liberians.
- January 22 – United States Ambassador Michael A. McCarthy presents his credentials to President Weah.
- April 1 – The results of the 2020 Liberian constitutional referendum are released. Voters reject efforts to shorten the president′s term and to allow dual citizenship.
- July 26 – University of Liberia President Dr. Julius S. Nelson Jr. serves as national Independence Day orator.
- December 9 – Senator Prince Johnson is sanctioned by the United States Department of the Treasury for alleged political corruption.

== Scheduled events ==
- March 10 – Decoration Day.
- March 15 – Joseph Jenkins Roberts Birthday.
- July 26 – Independence Day.

== Deaths ==
- May 28 – Emma Shannon Walser, first female circuit judge in Liberia (b. 1929)
- July 9 – Wesley Momo Johnson, Vice-Chairman of the National Transitional Government of Liberia (2003–2006), ambassador, and Olympian, in Montserrado County (b. 1944)
- November 8 – Willis Forko, Liberian professional footballer (b. 1983)

== See also ==
- COVID-19 pandemic in Africa
- Foreign relations of Liberia
