= 2017 in Liberia =

- Decades: 1990s; 2000s; 2010s; 2020s
- See also: Other events of 2017; Timeline of Liberian history

Events in the year 2017 in Liberia.

== Incumbents ==
- President: Ellen Johnson Sirleaf
- Vice President: Joseph Boakai
- Chief Justice: Francis S. Korkpor Sr.

== Events ==
In 2017, Liberia was ranked 28/40 in Political Rights and 34/60 in Civil Liberties.

- With presidential and legislative elections scheduled for October 2017, Liberia's political landscape saw jockeying among parties and politicians, amid a peaceful environment. By year's end, a number of credible contenders for the presidency had emerged.
- 26 June – Four political parties, the Liberia For Prosperity Party, the Redemption Democratic Congress, the Democratic Justice Party, and the Liberia Restoration Party, are certified by the National Elections Commission.
- 22 September – Liberia establishes diplomatic relations with Armenia.
- 10 October – scheduled date for the Liberian general election, 2017

== Deaths ==
- 8 January – Ruth Perry, politician (b. 1939).
- 21 February – Salome Karwah, nurse (born c.1988)
