= 1861 in Liberia =

- Decades: 1840s; 1850s; 1860s; 1870s; 1880s
- See also: Other events of 1861; Timeline of Liberian history

The following lists events that happened during 1861 in Liberia.

== Incumbents ==
- President: Stephen Allen Benson
- Vice President: Daniel Bashiel Warner
- Chief Justice: Boston Jenkins Drayton

== Events ==
=== May ===
- May 7 – Liberian constitutional referendum, 1861

== Births ==
- August 4 – Daniel Edward Howard, President of Liberia (1912–1920), in Buchanan (d. 1935)
