= 1927 in Liberia =

- Decades: 1900s; 1910s; 1920s; 1930s; 1940s
- See also: Other events of 1927; Timeline of Liberian history

The following lists events that happened during 1927 in Liberia.

== Incumbents ==
- President: Charles D. B. King
- Vice President: Henry Too Wesley
- Chief Justice: F. E. R. Johnson

== Events ==
- Harvey Firestone secured a 99-year lease on 1,000,000 acres (4,000 km^{2}) of Liberian land for rubber production.
- May 3 - A general election and constitutional referendum were held.
