= 2011 in Liberia =

- Decades: 1990s; 2000s; 2010s; 2020s
- See also: Other events of 2011; Timeline of Liberian history

Events in the year 2011 in Liberia.

== Incumbents ==
- President: Ellen Johnson Sirleaf
- Vice President: Joseph Boakai
- Chief Justice: Johnnie Lewis

== Events ==
- July 26 — Voinjama businesswoman Garmai Estella Korboi serves the national Independence Day orator.
- August 23 — The constitutional referendum is held, where proposed amendments seeking to change details about elections ultimately fail to be adopted.
- October 7 — President Sirleaf and activist Leymah Gbowee are awarded the Nobel Peace Prize.
- October 11 — The Liberian general election is held.
- November 7 — Police fire upon a march by the opposition party, the Congress for Democratic Change, with the United Nations reporting two deaths.
- November 8 — The presidential run-off election is held.
- November 15 — President Sirleaf is declared the winner of the 2011 presidential election by the National Elections Commission.

== Deaths ==
- February 28 – Ernest Eastman, former Minister of Foreign Affairs, (b. 1927)
- March 22 – Patrick Doeplah, football striker, in Monrovia (b. 1990)
- May 18 – Antoinette Tubman, former First Lady (1948–1971), (b. 1914)
- September 17 – George MacDonald Sacko, football striker, in Newark, New Jersey, U. S. (b. 1936)
- November 14 – Peter Naigow, Vice President of Liberia (1991), in Guinea
