= 2016 in Liberia =

- Decades: 1990s; 2000s; 2010s; 2020s
- See also: Other events of 2016; Timeline of Liberian history

Events in the year 2016 in Liberia.

== Incumbents ==
- President: Ellen Johnson Sirleaf
- Vice President: Joseph Boakai
- Chief Justice: Francis S. Korkpor, Sr.

== Events ==
- January 14 – Liberia is declared by the World Health Organization to be Ebola-free, and as such, the epidemic in Liberia is declared to be over.
- January 31 – The body of former managing director of the Liberia Petroleum Refining Company Harry Greaves is found on the beach near the Ministry of Foreign Affairs in Monrovia without an apparent cause of death. By August, American investigators would conclude that Greaves' death was caused by accidental drowning.
- March 31 – A woman dies in Monrovia of Ebola after the WHO's January declaration of Liberia being Ebola-free.
- April 28 – George Weah announces his candidacy for the 2017 Liberian presidential election at a rally in Monrovia.
- June 4 – The 49th ECOWAS heads of state meeting opens in Dakar, Senegal, which appoints President Sirleaf as the first female ECOWAS Chair.
- June 6 – President Sirleaf visits Israeli President Reuven Rivlin while visiting the country to receive an honorary degree from the University of Haifa.
- June 9 – The WHO announces the end of the Ebola outbreak in Liberia.
- June 23 – United States Ambassador Christine A. Elder presents her letter of credence to President Sirleaf.
- June 27 – President Sirleaf receives United States First Lady Michelle Obama at the Roberts International Airport.
- June 28 – Liberia establishes bilateral relations with Vietnam.
- July 24 – Madam Klayonoh Bleaorplue, who was allegedly born in 1863, is decorated with honours by President Sirleaf.
- July 26 – Dr. Dougbeh Chris Nyan serves as national Independence Day orator.
- August 12 – Liberia establishes diplomatic relations with Laos.
- November 21 – Former First Lady Nancy Doe files suit against the Liberian government in the ECOWAS Court for alleged violation of her property rights.
- December 29 – The Coalition for Democratic Change is certified by the National Elections Commission, initially consisting of the Congress for Democratic Change, the Liberia People's Democratic Party, and the National Patriotic Party.

== Deaths ==
- January 30 – Clarence Lorenzo Simpson Jr., former Minister of Justice and Associate Justice of Supreme Court, in Brewerville (b. 1933)
- July 23 – Edward B. McClain Jr., Minister of State for Presidential Affairs, in Pretoria, South Africa
- August 9 – Nathaniel Williams, former River Gee County Senator, in Monrovia
