= 2012 in Liberia =

- Decades: 1990s; 2000s; 2010s; 2020s
- See also: Other events of 2012; Timeline of Liberian history

Events in the year 2012 in Liberia.

== Incumbents ==
- President: Ellen Johnson Sirleaf
- Vice President: Joseph Boakai
- Chief Justice: Johnnie Lewis (until September 10), then Francis S. Korkpor, Sr. (as Chief Justice Ad Interim)

== Events ==
- January 16 – President Sirleaf takes her second oath of office after being re-elected in 2011.
- March 30 – Former warlord George Boley is deported from the United States back to Liberia.
- April 26 – Former President Charles Taylor is found guilty on 11 counts of aiding and abetting war crimes and crimes against humanity during the Sierra Leone Civil War.
- May 2 – Ambassador Jeremiah Sulunteh presents his letters of credence to United States President Barack Obama.
- May 30 – Former President Charles Taylor is sentenced to 50 years in prison by the Special Court for Sierra Leone.
- June 28 – Vice President Joseph Boakai launches the 2012 Comprehensive Food Security And Nutrition Survey in Paynesville.
- July 20 – A bill sponsored by Bong County Senator Jewel Taylor seeking to felonize same-sex marriage is passed unanimously through the Senate.
- July 26 – Historian Dr. D. Elwood Dunn serves as the national Independence Day orator.
- September 10 – Chief Justice Johnnie Lewis resigns due to poor health.
- September 13 – Mae Azango, along with three other journalists, is awarded the 2012 CPJ International Press Freedom Award.
- September 14 – At the Summer Paralympics in London, James Siaffa becomes the first Paralympian to represent Liberia in any sport, in the men's 82.5 kg powerlifting event.

== Deaths ==
- May 14 – Burgess Carr, Liberian-born religious leader, in Lawrenceville, Georgia, U. S. (b. 1935)
- June 8 – Tom Kamara, journalist, in Brussels, Belgium (b. 1949)
