= 1907 in Liberia =

- Decades: 1880s; 1890s; 1900s; 1910s; 1920s
- See also: Other events of 1907; Timeline of Liberian history

The following lists events that happened during 1907 in Liberia.

== Incumbents ==
- President: Arthur Barclay
- Vice President: James Jenkins Dossen
- Chief Justice: Zacharia B. Roberts

== Events ==
=== January ===
- January 2 – The Liberian National Bar Association is officially launched.

=== May ===
- May 7 – Liberian constitutional referendum, 1907
