= 2014 in Liberia =

- Decades: 1990s; 2000s; 2010s; 2020s
- See also: Other events of 2014; Timeline of Liberian history

Events in the year 2014 in Liberia.

== Incumbents ==
- President: Ellen Johnson Sirleaf
- Vice President: Joseph Boakai
- Chief Justice: Francis S. Korkpor, Sr.

== Events ==
- March 30 – Liberia confirms its first two cases of Ebola in the Foya District in Lofa County.
- June 25 – Dudley McKinley Thomas is accredited as the Liberian ambassador to the People's Republic of China.
- July 26 – Tubman University President Dr. Elizabeth Davis Russell served as national Independence Day orator.
- August 6 – President Sirleaf declares a state of emergency due to the Ebola epidemic.
- November 13 – President Sirleaf lifts the state of emergency caused by the Ebola epidemic.
- December 10 – Ebola fighters are declared Time Person of the Year, with Liberian Ebola health care worker Salome Karwah appearing on the cover of the magazine.
- December 20
  - The Liberian Senate election takes place after being delayed twice due to the Ebola epidemic.
  - George Weah is first elected to the Senate, where he represents Montserrado County.
- Full Date Unknown
  - The People's Unification Party is founded.

== Deaths ==
- April 16 – Gyude Bryant, Chairman of the Transitional Government of Liberia (2003–2006), in Monrovia (b. 1949)
- July 28 – Willis Knuckles, government minister (2007–2009), in Accra, Ghana (b. 1946)

== See also ==
- Ebola virus epidemic in Liberia
