= 2023 in Liberia =

- Decades: 2000s; 2010s; 2020s
- See also: Other events of 2023; Timeline of Liberian history

Zanzan Karwor

Events in the year 2023 in Liberia.

== Incumbents ==
- President: George Weah
- Vice President: Jewel Taylor
- Chief Justice: Sie-A-Nyene Yuoh

== Events ==
- April 28 – Unity Party presidential candidate Joseph Boakai announces Jeremiah Koung as his running mate.
- July 26 – National Traditional Council Chairman Chief Zanzan Karwor serves as National Independence Day orator.
- October 10 – 2023 Liberian general election
- November 14 – Liberians elect their president in a run-off. Incumbent president George Weah runs for re-election.
- November 17 – President Weah concedes the 2023 presidential election.
- December 21 – Former Chief Justice Gloria Musu-Scott is convicted of murder.

== Sports ==
- 2023 Africa Cup of Nations qualification

== Deaths ==
- 26 June – Florence Chenoweth, former minister of agriculture, in Monrovia (b. 1945)
- 18 July – Hans Barchue, member of the Liberian House of Representatives, in Monrovia
- 8 August – Daniel Naatehn, member of the Liberian Senate, in India
- 24 August – Henry Reed Cooper, former Chief Justice of Liberia, in Monrovia (b. 1940)
- 4 December – Erol Madison Gwion, member of the Liberian House of Representatives (b. 1964)

== See also ==
- COVID-19 pandemic in Africa
- Foreign relations of Liberia
