= 1927 Baltimore mayoral election =

Baltimore mayoral election, 1927
- May 3, 1927
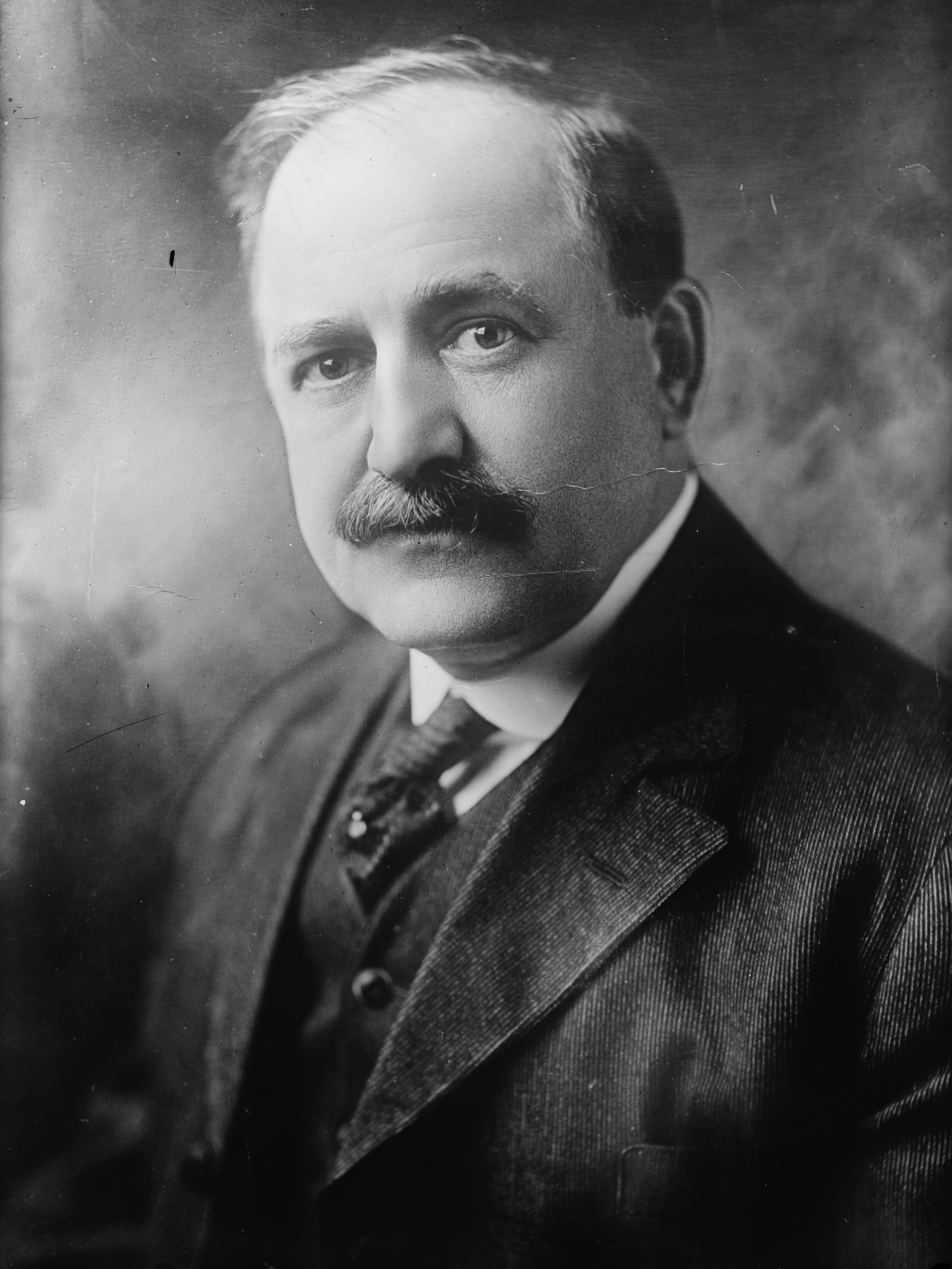

Candidate	William Frederick Broening	William Cullen
Party	Republican	Democratic
Popular vote	85,695	68,299
Percentage	55.65%	44.35%
Mayor before election
William Frederick Broening
Republican
Elected mayor
Howard W. Jackson
Democratic

The 1927 Baltimore mayoral election saw the return of William Frederick Broening to the mayoralty for a second nonconsecutive term.

== General election ==
The general election was held May 3.

Baltimore mayoral general election, 1927
Party	Candidate	Votes	%
Republican	William Frederick Broening (incumbent)	85,695	55.65%
Democratic	William Cullen	68,299	44.35%
Total votes		153,994	
