= 2013 in Liberia =

- Decades: 1990s; 2000s; 2010s; 2020s
- See also: Other events of 2013; Timeline of Liberian history

Events in the year 2013 in Liberia.

== Incumbents ==
- President: Ellen Johnson Sirleaf
- Vice President: Joseph Boakai
- Chief Justice: Francis S. Korkpor, Sr.

== Events ==
- February 11 – A Guinean plane crashes near Monrovia, killing 11 people, including Guineain army officer Lt. General Souleymane Kelefa Diallo. President Sirleaf declares a national day of mourning the next day, February 12.
- February 28 – Acting Monrovia Mayor Mary Broh resigns amidst controversy.
- April 18 – Senior Associate Justice Francis Korkpor is appointed Chief Justice of the Supreme Court of Liberia. Korkpor had been serving as Interim Chief Justice ever since Johnnie Lewis' resignation in September 2012.
- June 17 – Liberia makes its first appearance at a G8 summit, due to an invitation from British Prime Minister David Cameron to President Sirleaf.
- June 20 – Liberia sends its first deployment of 50 troops to Mali to join the United Nations peacekeeping mission.
- July 8 – President Sirleaf nominates 15 city mayors, including the renomination of Mary Broh as mayor of Monrovia, following her resignation in February.
- July 26 – Unity Party Chairman Varney Sherman serves as the national Independence Day orator, delivering his speech in Tubmanburg.
- August 17 – The Alternative National Congress launches after being certified with the National Elections Commission.
- August 21 – Rodney Sieh, publisher and editor-in-chief of the newspaper FrontPage Africa, is arrested. Sieh was arrested following a conviction of libel against Agricultural Minister Chris Toe by the Supreme Court, and subsequently being unable to pay the $1.5 million dollars dictated by the ruling.
- September 12 – President Sirleaf is awarded the Indira Gandhi Prize for Peace, Disarmament and Development by Indian President Pranab Mukherjee.
- September 29 – President Sirleaf makes a state visit to Costa Rica at the invitation of Costa Rican President Laura Chinchilla which lasts until October 1.
- November 8 – Rodney Sieh is released from prison.
- Full Date Unknown
  - Joshua Milton Blahyi, better known as General Butt Naked, publishes his memoir The Redemption of an African Warlord.

== Deaths ==
- April 1 – Moses Blah, former President of Liberia (2003), in Monrovia (b. 1947)
- May 19 – Michael Kpakala Francis, Catholic prelate, in Monrovia (b. 1936)
- November 25 – Musue Noha Haddad, journalist, in Monrovia (b. 1968)
