= Cyvette Gibson =

Liberian politician

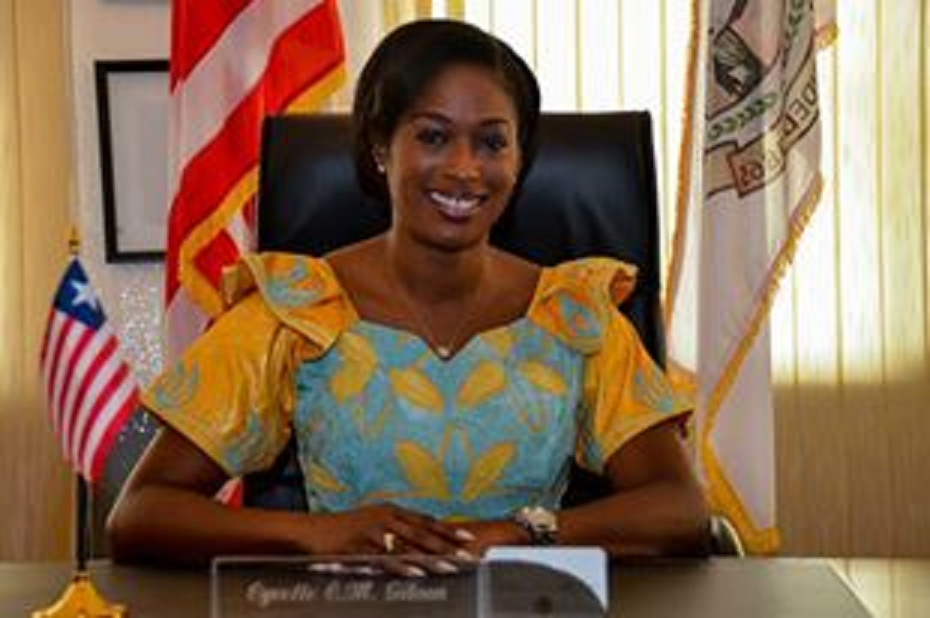
Mayor Gibson in office at the Paynesville City Hall

Cyvette M. Gibson is the tenth Mayor of Paynesville, Liberia. Gibson has been a community advocate for years, working over the past 17 years in women's empowerment, legal, and city administration in Liberia and the United States. She was appointed as acting Mayor on November 14, 2012; the youngest mayor in the country. Gibson has focused on providing infrastructure, education, access to employment and entreprenuriship, and basic services such as water, energy, sanitation, housing, health, and safety. Her administration faced an Ebola epidemic, persistent waste management issues, and human rights concerns.

== Early life and education ==
C. Cyvette M. Gibson was born in Dakar, Senegal on December 2, 1974. She is the first daughter of Liberian natives Yvette Chesson-Wureh and Chauncy M. Gibson. Her grandfather was Attorney General Joseph J. F. Chesson, who was executed by firing squad during the 1980 Liberian coup d'état. While residing on the Old Road in Sinkor, Monrovia, Liberia, she pursued her early education at Bright Functional on Benson Street, Monrovia; the School of Prime Systems near the Coca-Cola Factory in Paynesville; and the Joseph Jenkins Roberts Memorial Institute on 12th Street, Sinkor, Monrovia. However, due to the events surrounding the 1980 coup d'état, she and her mother were forced into exile.

While living on Old Road in Sinkor, Monrovia, Liberia, she received her early education at Bright Functional on Benson Street, the School of Prime Systems near the Coca-Cola factory in Paynesville, and the Joseph Jenkins Roberts Memorial Institute on 12th Street in Sinkor. However, following the events of the 1980 coup d'état, she and her mother were forced into exile.

Mayor Gibson attended the College of North West London, where she majored in Social Science in 1995. Between 1994 and 1995, she also earned certificates in Public Speaking, Critical Reading and Writing, International Studies, and Literacy and Information Technology. She later completed her studies at the Catholic University of America and also underwent Paralegal training at West Law Paralegal.

== Political career ==
Cyvette Gibson served as chief of office at the Monrovia City Corporation under the administration of then Mayor Mary Broh. During this time, it was reported that Gibson insulted journalists reporting on claims of human rights abuses by the mayor.

Gibson was appointed as acting Mayor of the city of Paynesville, Liberia on November 14, 2012. She was the youngest mayor in the country when appointed by President Ellen Johnson Sirleaf to the position.

Waste issues have dominated much of her tenure as Mayor of the city. While she has pushed many different trash initiatives, some of these have been criticized by citizen groups for not addressing the problem. Much of the focus has been on the commercial center of the Monrovia region, known as Red Light Market. As Mayor, she implemented city ordinances and beautification projects, including the ELWA Junction Beautification Project, which reduced pollution and littering. In April 2014, she called for greater attention to waste issues from the Liberia Marketing Association. With limited funding, she was able to enlist the support of many residents of the city (including drug addicts and the homeless) to clean up Red Light. While she focused significant attention on health during the West African Ebola virus epidemic, she turned again to waste issues afterward with a significant grant from the World Bank.

Gibson organized efforts throughout the city to deal with the Ebola outbreak in the country. She used community leaders throughout the city to educate and identify potential Ebola victims. These efforts were assisted by UNICEF. At the height of the outbreak, she was one of seven officials who were excluded from a blanket dismissal of officials by President Johnson-Sirleaf.

Since the outbreak, she has continued the focus on waste, sanitation, and education in the city. In addition, major efforts have been undertaken on development of the Dupont Road area of the city. A 2016 editorial in FrontPage Africa singled her efforts out as "transforming a once failed city."

=== Paynesville's partnerships ===
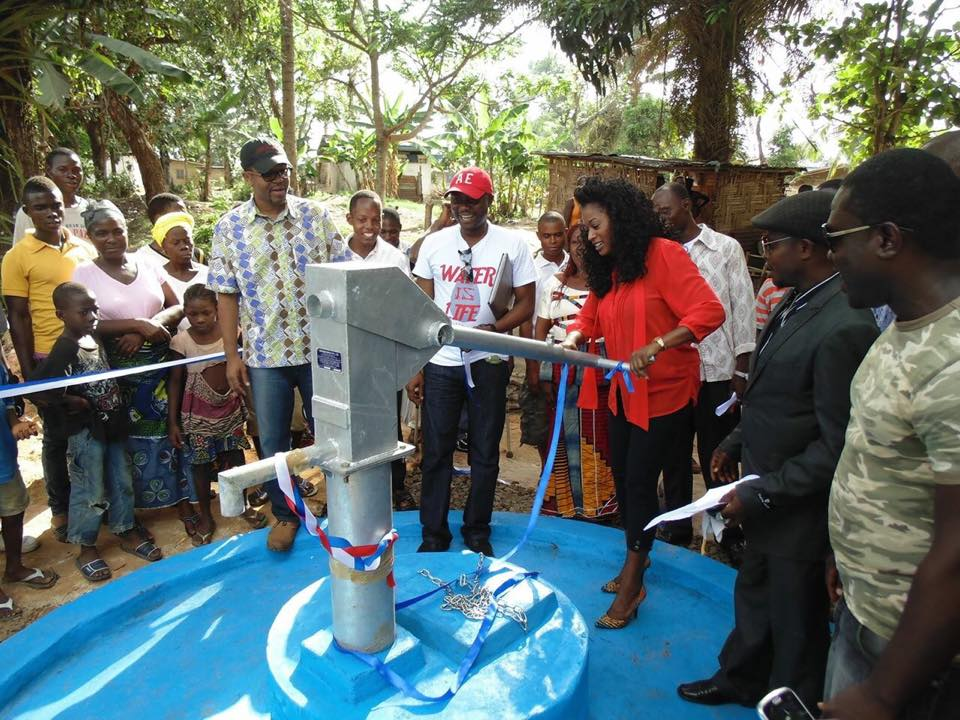
A well being opened by Mayor Gibson in Paynesville

The City of Paynesville in its efforts towards a clean and developed city, has joined the 100 Resilient Cities network.

Paynesville under the leadership of Mayor Gibson also established sister city relationship with the City of Paynesville, Minnesota (USA) and the City of Bagcilar, Istanbul (Turkey).

=== Achievements ===
- Operation Stop Ebola was a community base awareness campaign in collaboration with UNICEF to fight the deadly Ebola Virus Disease (EVD). The campaign utilized over four hundred (400) community leaders to collect EVD data, promote sensitization awareness about the EVD and how to stop it. The campaigns also provided hygiene materials and implemented permanent hand-washing stations in communities.
- The PCC held its first annual Science Fair November 24, 2016, challenging students to expand their interest in innovative discoveries in the sciences.

== Awards ==
- Mayor Gibson received 2014 Awards from the Paynesville Youth for Education and Development for Financial and Moral support given to the Young people of Paynesville.
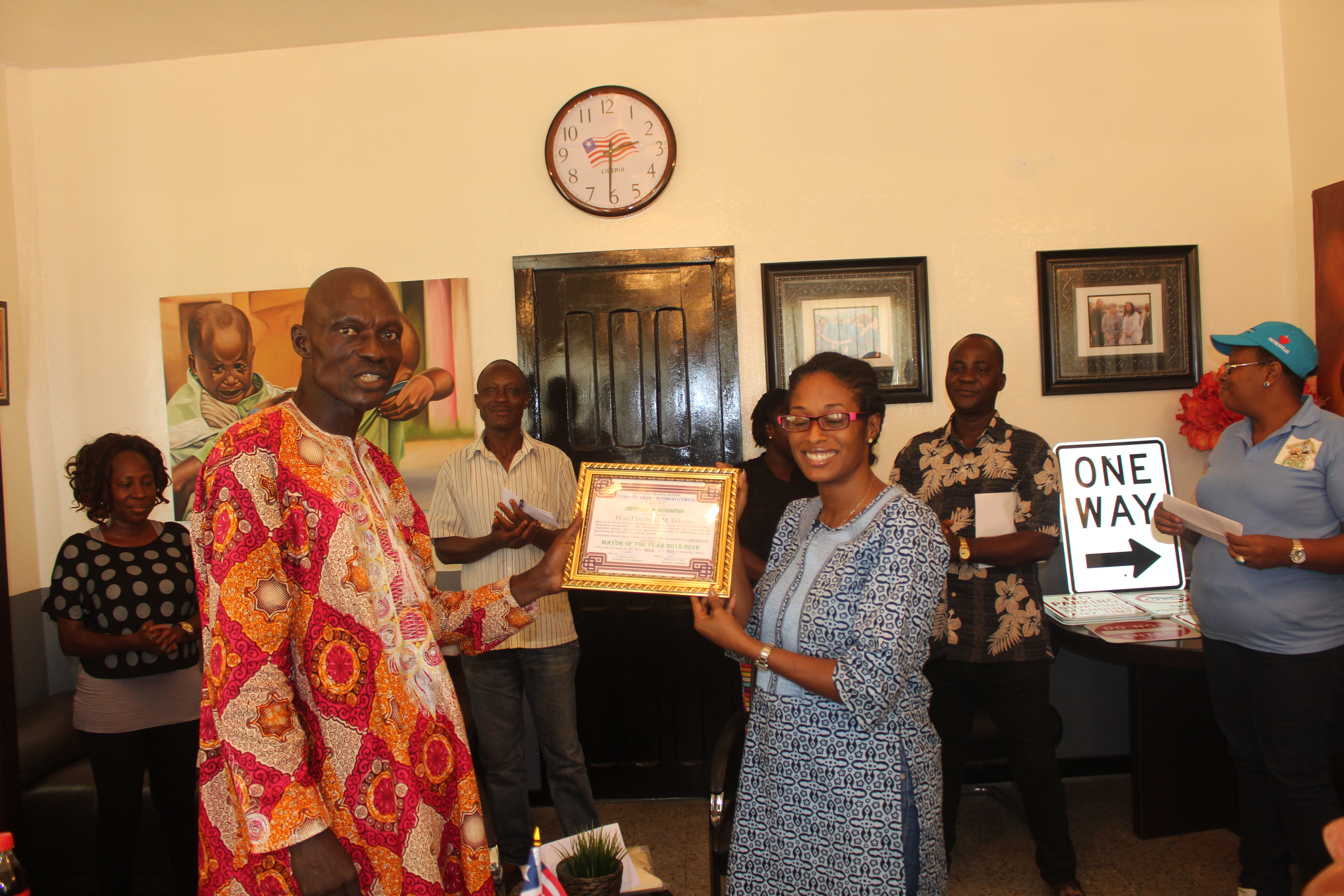
  Mayor Gibson receives Mayor of the year Award.
- She became the President of the Association of Mayors and Local Government Authorities of Liberia in 2017.
