= Facia Boyenoh Harris =

Liberian activist

- Born: c.1983
- Education: African Methodist Episcopal University
- Occupation: lawyer
- Known for: Women's rights activist

Facia Boyenoh Harris is a Liberian lawyer and a women’s rights activist against gender-based violence in Liberia in particular against pervasive sexual assault and harassment of school-aged girls.

== Life ==
Harris was born in about 1983. When she was studying in Monrovia at the African Methodist Episcopal University she became a co founder of Paramount Young Women Initiative which raised money to subsidise other students to study.

She is an attorney and the Director for Outreach and Sensitization of Liberia’s Freedom of Information Act-enforcing Independent Information Commission. She was awarded the International Women of Courage Award in 2022.

In 2024 she was elected to be the Secretary General of the Bong County Bar Association in Liberia.
