= 1927 Liechtenstein referendums =

Building industry liberalisation initiative
For	45.1%
Against	54.9%

Landtag counterproposal to the building industry liberalisation initiative
For	5.4%
Against	94.6%

Amending the law on salaries and compensation
For	35.21%
Against	64.79%

Three referendums were held in Liechtenstein during 1927. The first two were held on 30 January and consisted of an initiative to liberalise the building industry and a counterproposal from the Landtag. Both were rejected by a majority of voters. The third was held on 1 May on the subject of amending the law on salaries and compensation. It was also rejected.

== Results ==
=== Building industry liberalisation initiative ===
Choice	Votes	%
For	804	45.1
Against	979	54.9
Invalid/blank votes	59	–
Total	1,877	100
Registered voters/turnout	2,253	83.3
Source: Nohlen & Stöver

=== Building industry liberalisation counterproposal ===
Choice	Votes	%
For	88	5.4
Against	1,550	94.6
Invalid/blank votes	59	–
Total	1,877	100
Registered voters/turnout	2,253	83.3
Source: Nohlen & Stöver

=== Amendment of the law on salaries and compensation ===
Choice	Votes	%
For	658	35.2
Against	1,211	64.8
Invalid/blank votes	69	–
Total	1,938	100
Registered voters/turnout	2,255	86.1
Source: Nohlen & Stöver
