= 1927 Swiss referendum =

A double referendum was held in Switzerland on 15 May 1927. Voters were asked whether they approved of amending article 30 of the constitution and a federal law on car and bicycle traffic. The constitutional amendment was approved by voters, whilst the traffic law was rejected.

== Background ==
The constitutional question was a mandatory referendum, which required a double majority; a majority of the popular vote and majority of the cantons. The decision of each canton was based on the vote in that canton. Full cantons counted as one vote, whilst half cantons counted as half. The traffic law question was an optional referendum, and required only a majority of voters.

== Results ==
=== Constitutional amendment ===
Choice	Popular vote		Cantons		
Choice	Votes	%	Full	Half	Total
For	334,206	62.6	18	6	21
Against	199,305	37.4	1	0	0
Blank votes	39,566	–	–	–	–
Invalid votes	1,137	–	–	–	–
Total	574,214	100	19	6	22
Registered voters/turnout	1,038,136	55.3	–	–	–
Source: Nohlen & Stöver

=== Traffic law ===
Choice	Votes	%
For	230,287	40.1
Against	343,387	59.9
Blank votes	25,652	–
Invalid votes	1,275	–
Total	600,601	100
Registered voters/turnout	1,038,136	59.9
Source: Nohlen & Stöver
