= 1907 Liberian constitutional referendum =

- 7 May 1907

Results
Choice	Votes	%
Yes	5,112	77.70%
No	1,467	22.30%
Valid votes	6,579	100.00%
Invalid or blank votes	0	0.00%
Total votes	6,579	100.00%

A referendum on extending the term length for the President, Senators and members of the House of Representatives was held in Liberia on 7 May 1907. It lengthened the terms of all such officials: the President (two years to four), House of Representatives (two years to four), and the Senate (four years to six).

== Results ==
Choice	Votes	%
For	5,112	77.70
Against	1,467	22.30
Total	6,579	100.00
Source: African Elections Database
