= Mawine G. Diggs =

Liberian administrator and minister

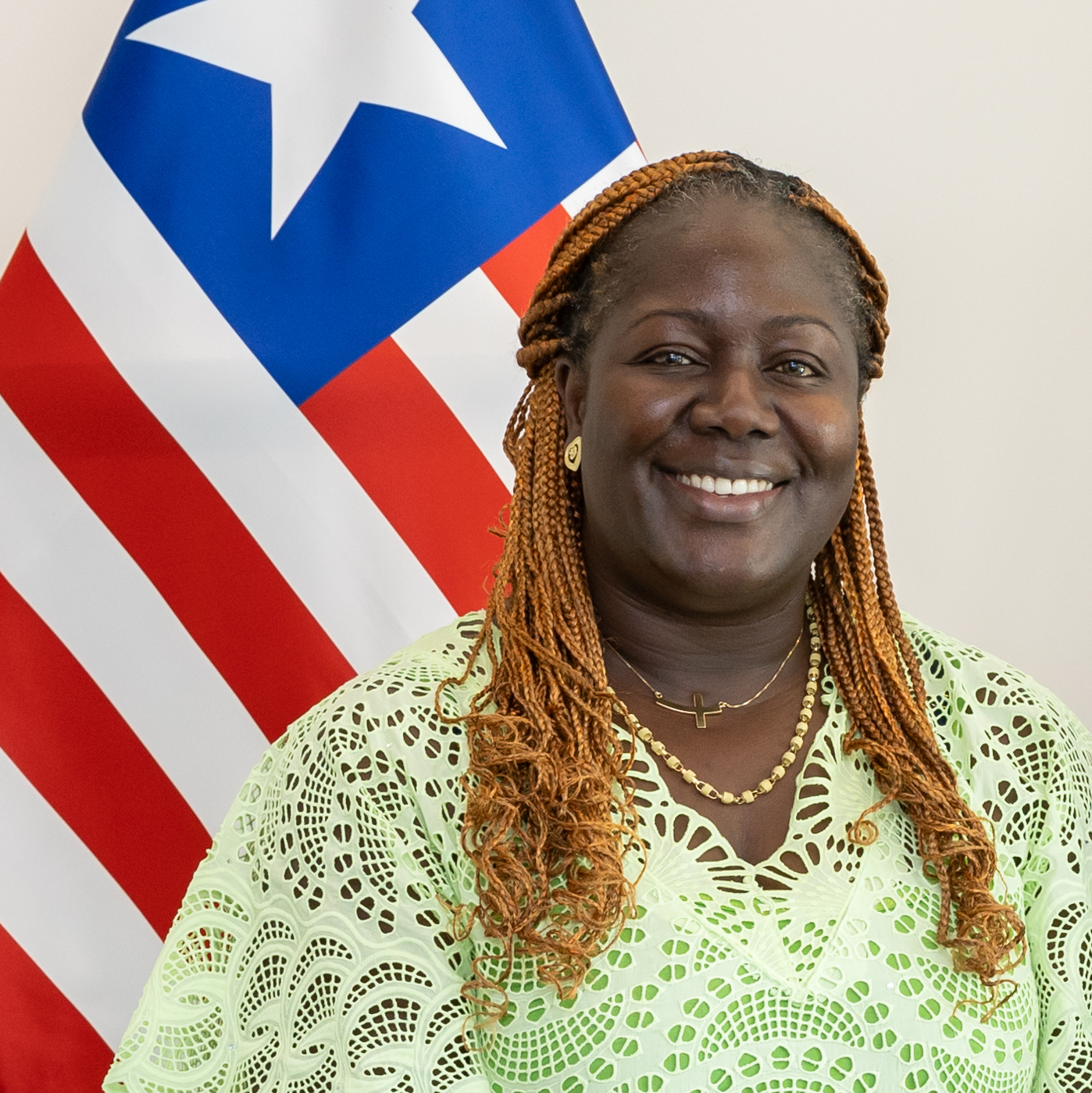
- Born: c. 1982; Liberia
- Education: Roanoke College, Clemson University

Mawine G. Diggs (born c. 1982) is a Liberian administrator and minister. In 2020 she was appointed to be Liberia's minister of Commerce and Industry. On 26 July 2022 she made her country's 175th National Independence Day Oration.

== Life ==
Diggs was born in about 1982. When she was about seven she moved to America. Her father died in the Liberian Civil War. She attended high school in Libera but she returned to the United States for her tertiary education. Her first degree was in Environmental Policy which she obtained from Roanoke College in Virginia. Her master's degree was in Education from South Carolina's Clemson University.

In 2018 she was working for Wayne County Community College District in Michigan leading their eastern campus. She was responsible for 750 employees and a budget of $15m, when the new Liberian President George Weah appointed her to lead Liberia's National Commission on Higher Education as its director-general. She was the first woman to lead the commission since it was founded in 1989. The commission oversees the country's institutions that award degrees and they publish guidelines for these bodies.

She was appointed Acting and Deputy Minister and a Special Presidential Envoy until she was promoted to be a government minister in 2020. She was appointed by the President to lead Liberia's ministry of Commerce and Industry.

On 26 July 2022 she made the 175th National Independence Day Oration taking the theme of fostering unity. She encouraged critics to support the current administration. Liberia relies on doner funding and she encouraged those make these funds available to reduce the number of restrictions that are attached to such gifts.
