= Emma Shannon Walser =

Liberian lawyer and jurist (1929–2021)

Judge
- In office 1971–1979

Personal details
- Born: 24 July 1929 Maryland County, Liberia
- Died: 28 May 2021 (aged 91)
- Education: University of Liberia

Emma Shannon Walser (24 July 1929 – May 28, 2021) was a Liberian lawyer and jurist who became the country's first female judge in 1971.

== Early life and education ==
Walser was born in Maryland County on 24 July 1929 to Eugene Himie Shannon and Edith E. Harris. Her father was Chief Justice of the Supreme Court. She went to school at St Theresa's convent in Monrovia and then to Secretarial College. She worked as private secretary to the Manager of the Bank of Monrovia for a number of years. She later returned to study at the University of Liberia, graduating with an LLB in 1969.

== Career ==
Walser was appointed a judge to the Montserrado County judicial circuit in 1971 by President William R. Tolbert Jr., making her the country's first female judge. She was seen as a progressive and liberal judge. "While it was customary for judges to decide cases based on instructions from the president, Walser gained a reputation for deciding cases strictly on merit and the law."

Walser publicly refused to sentence an indigenous man to a death sentence because she argued he had been poorly represented by a state lawyer, leading to a Supreme Court of Liberia finding in Republic of Liberia v. Emma Shannon-Walser, 27 LLR 274 (1978) that the constitutional right to counsel includes the right to competent counsel. In 1975, she was the head of a special committee appointed to study all laws affecting women's rights.

In April 1979, Walser challenged the government's detention of opposition leaders alleged to have instigated the rice riots, a precursor to the 1980 Coup d'état. She was removed from the bench in 1979 by a joint resolution of the conservative Legislature. Five hundred Liberian women, including Olubanke King Akerele, petitioned and protested the action, to no avail. In 2007, Walser was named by the Liberian People's Party as one of those whose "only crime was the advocacy of participatory democracy."

Walser later worked for Amnesty International and moved to Switzerland.

== Honours ==
In October 1975, Walser was one of six women presented with the Pax Orbis ex Jure award by the World Peace through Law Center in Washington D.C.

In 2006, Walser was invited by President Ellen Johnson Sirleaf to be the National Orator on Independence Day. In 2014, she was honoured by the Liberian National Bar Association for her services to the Liberian state.

== Death ==
Walser died on 28 May 2021. A memorial service was held on 9 June 2021 at the Lady of Lebanon Catholic Church in Monrovia. Upon her death, former Foreign Minister, Olubanke King Akerele called upon the legislature to repeal the resolution that removed her as a Judge and reinstate her.
