= 1861 Liberian constitutional referendum =

A referendum on additional representation in the House of Representatives for Maryland County was held in Liberia on 7 May 1861. The proposal to increase the number of representatives from one to three was approved by the requisite two-thirds majority, and was passed.
