= 1870 in Liberia =

- Decades: 1850s; 1860s; 1870s; 1880s; 1890s
- See also: Other events of 1870; Timeline of Liberian history

The following lists events that happened during 1870 in Liberia.

== Incumbents ==
- President: James Spriggs Payne (until January 3), Edward James Roye (starting January 3)
- Vice President: Joseph Gibson (until January 3), James Skivring Smith (starting January 3)
- Chief Justice: C. L. Parsons

== Events ==
=== May ===
- May 3 – Liberian constitutional referendum, 1870

== Births ==
- January 30 – Theophilus Momolu Gardiner, Liberian religious leader, in Dearlah, Grand Cape Mount County, (d. 1941)
- October 29 – Samuel Alfred Ross, Vice President of Liberia (1920–1924), in Greenville (d. 1929)
