= 2019 in Liberia =

- Decades: 1990s; 2000s; 2010s; 2020s
- See also: Other events of 2019; Timeline of Liberian history

Events in the year 2019 in Liberia.

== Incumbents ==
- President: George Weah
- Vice President: Jewel Taylor
- Chief Justice: Francis S. Korkpor, Sr.

== Events ==
- February 15 – Bong County Superintendent Esther Walker is suspended by President Weah.
- February 18 – President Weah, on February 15, declared this day a national day of mourning due to the deaths of over 40 people in a mudslide at an illegal mining operation in Gbanipea in Nimba County.
- May 20 – Former President Ellen Johnson Sirleaf is appointed by World Health Organization Director General Tedros Adhanom Ghebreyesus as Goodwill Ambassador for the health workforce.
- June 7 – The Weah administration blocks a number of social media websites in response to anti-government protests against high inflation rates and corruption.
- June 20
  - The National Peace Hut Women of Liberia win the 2019 United Nations Population Award.
  - First Lady Clar Weah launches the 'She's You' movement.
- July 26 – Nobel Peace Laureate Leymah Gbowee serves as the national Independence Day orator.
- July 29 – The Montserrado County senatorial by-election is conducted. Abraham Darius Dillon, backed by four opposition parties, defeats ruling party candidate Paulita C. C. Wie.
- August 30 – President Weah and Japanese Prime Minister Shinzo Abe hold a summit meeting.
- September 18 – At least 27 people, mostly children, killed by a fire in an Islamic boarding school in Paynesville.
- November 16 – Bucky Raw wins Artist of the Year at the 2019 MTN Liberia Music Awards.

== Deaths ==
- March 25 – Adolph Lawrence, Member of the House of Representatives (2012–2019), in motor accident (b. 1969)
- July 4 – Christopher Minikon, ambassador and politician, in Rockville, Maryland, U. S. (b. 1933)
- November 10 – Charles Brumskine, President Pro Tempore of the Senate (1997–1999), (b. 1951)
