= 1927 Turkish general election =

- 20 July 1927

All 335 seats on the Grand National Assembly 168 seats needed for a majority
- Turnout: 20%
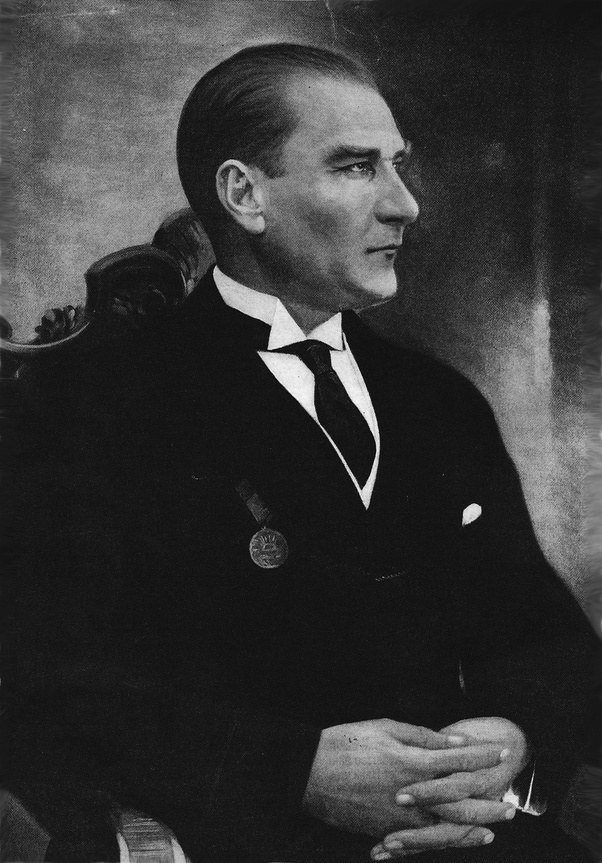
	First party
Leader	Mustafa Kemal Pasha
Party	CHP
Last election	332
Seats won	335
Seat change	▲3
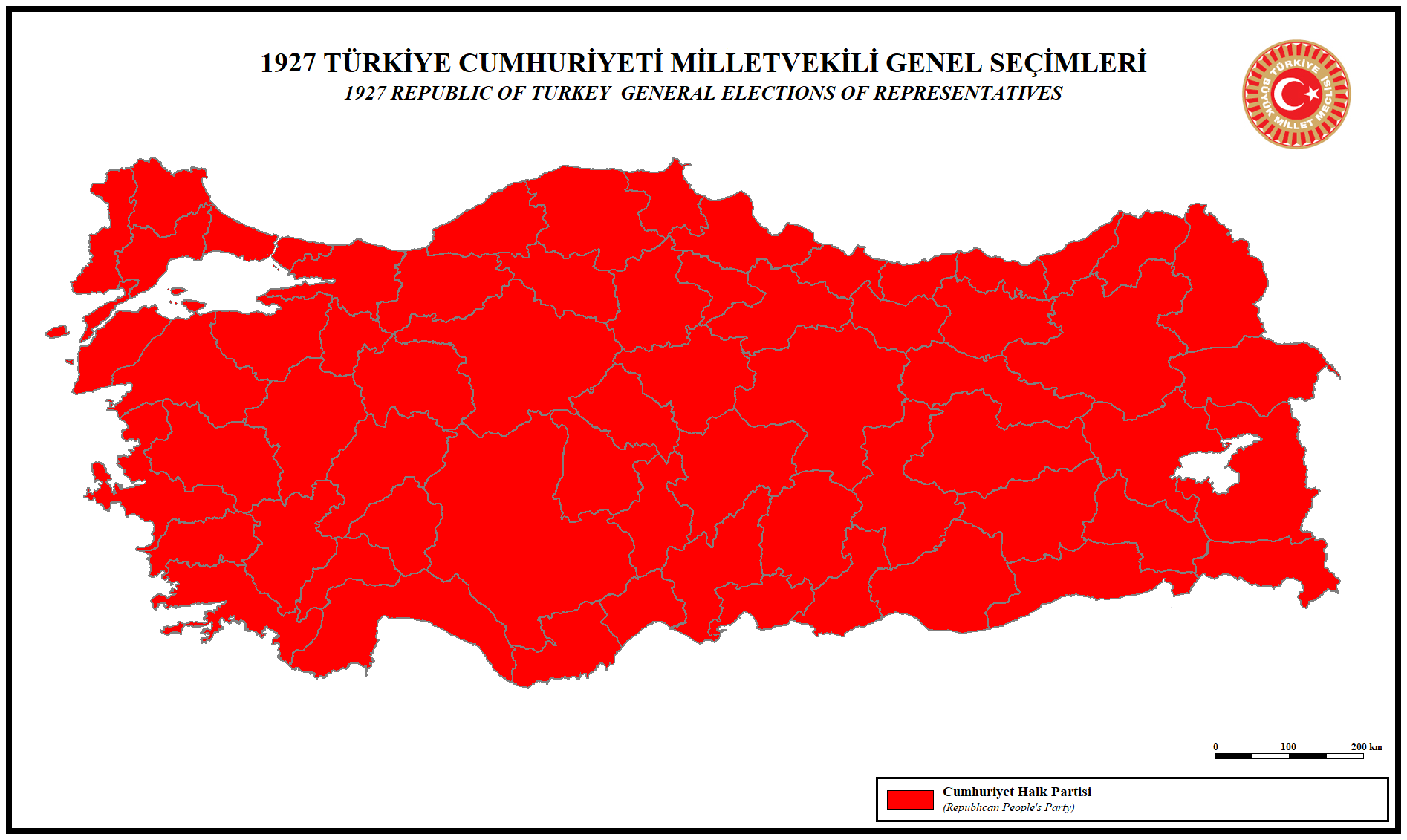
Prime Minister before election
İsmet İnönü
CHP
Elected Prime Minister
İsmet İnönü
CHP

General elections were held in Turkey in 1927. The Republican People's Party ("Association for the Defense of the Rights of Anatolia and Rumelia" until 9 September 1923) was the only party in the country at the time, as the Progressive Republican Party that had been set up in 1924 was dissolved the following year.

== Electoral system ==
The elections were held under the Ottoman electoral law passed in 1908, which provided for a two-stage process. In the first stage, voters elected secondary electors (one for the first 750 voters in a constituency, then one for every additional 500 voters). In the second stage the secondary electors elected the members of the Turkish Grand National Assembly.
