= 1927 San Francisco mayoral election =

- November 8, 1927
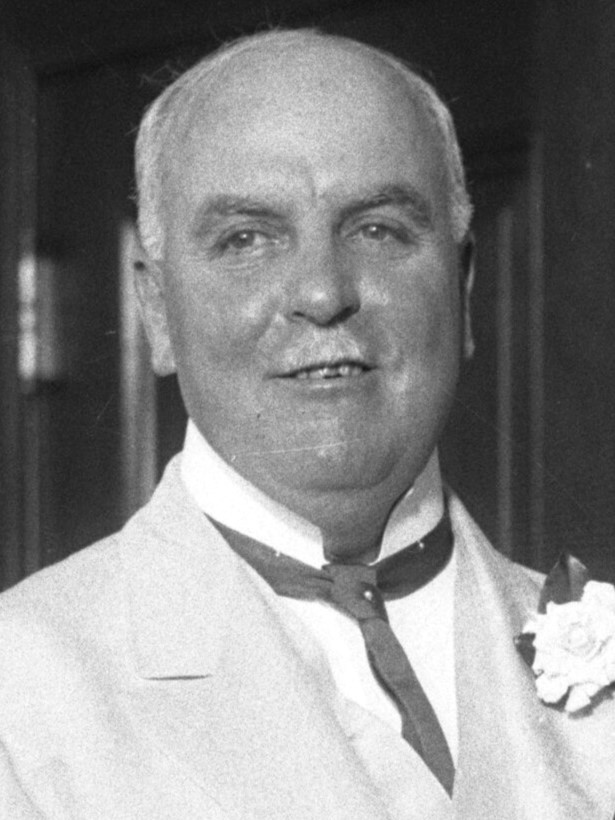

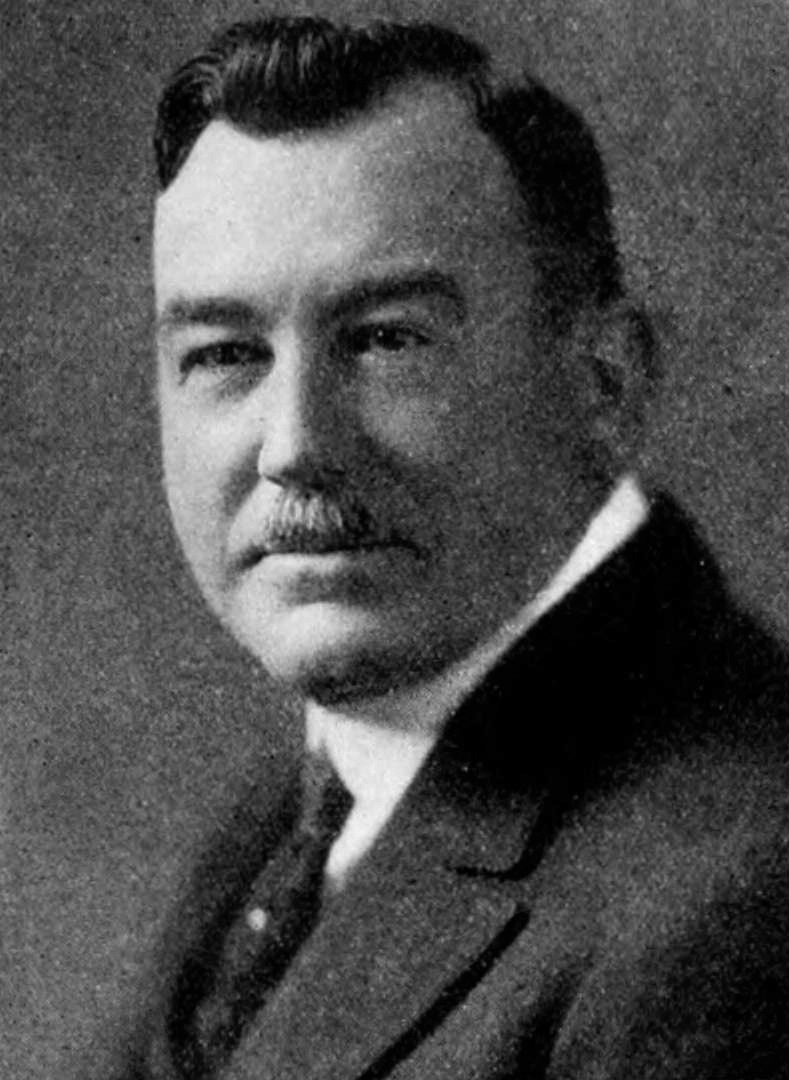

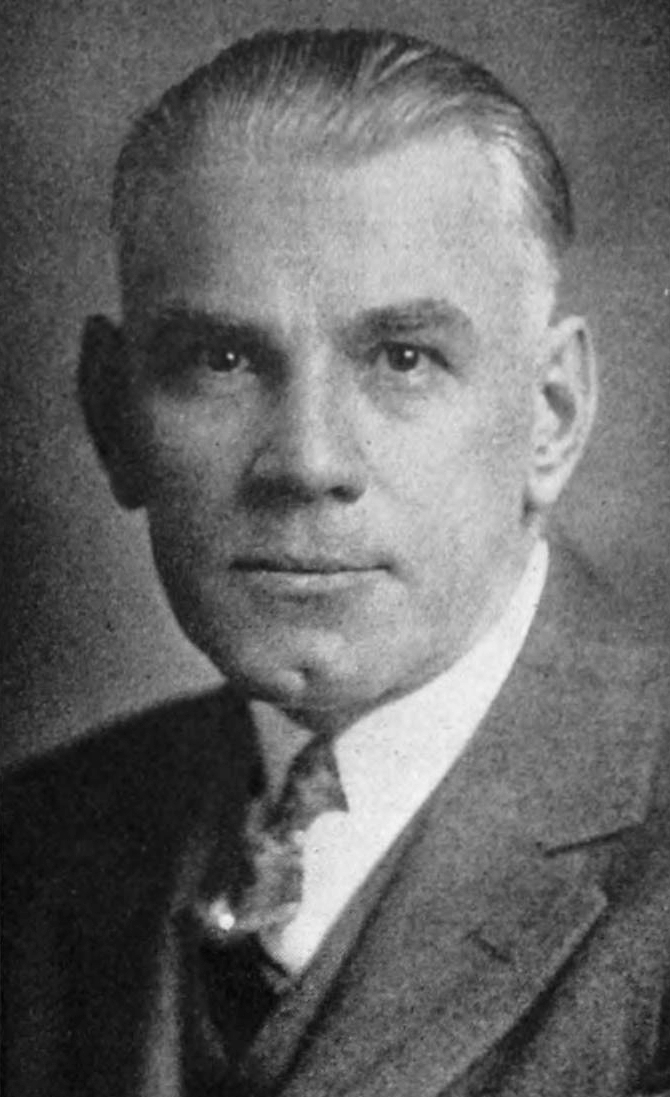
Candidate	James Rolph Jr.	James E. Power	Adolph Uhl
Party	Nonpartisan	Republican	Nonpartisan
Alliance		Union Labor
Popular vote	90,359	59,335	11,365
Percentage	56.01%	36.78%	7.05%
Mayor before election
James Rolph Jr.
Republican
Elected Mayor
James Rolph Jr.
Republican

The 1927 San Francisco mayoral election was held on November 8, 1927. Incumbent James Rolph Jr. was re-elected with 56% of the vote.

== Results ==
1927 San Francisco mayoral election
Party	Candidate	Votes	%
Nonpartisan	James Rolph Jr.	90,359	56.01%
Republican	James E. Power	59,335	36.78%
Nonpartisan	Adolph Uhl	11,365	7.05%
Nonpartisan	John E. Hines	269	0.17%
Total votes		161,328	100.00
