= 1927 Bolivian legislative election =

Parliamentary elections were held in Bolivia in May 1927 to elect members of the National Congress.

== Results ==
Party	Seats	
Party	Chamber	Senate
Liberal Party	15	15
Nationalist Party	22	6
Genuine Republican Party	17	5
Republican Party	15	2
Socialist Party	2	0
Workers' Party	1	0
Total	72	28
Source: Political Handbook of the World
