= 1927 Soviet Union legislative election =

Legislative elections were held in the Soviet Union in April 1927 to elect members of the Congress of Soviets, having originally been scheduled for 1 January. H. N. Brailsford, in his book, How the Soviets Work, he described how the elections work:

A General Election was going on in Russia during my stay this year. Save for the reports in the news-papers, one would hardly have suspected it ... There is no organization which could compile any alternative list of candidates, and if by mischance this were to happen in one electoral area, there could be no arrangement ... No large issues of policy are ever settled at a Soviet election ... The business of an election is rather to choose persons who will carry out the day to day work of administration. The entire structure of the Soviet system lends itself naturally to this limitation ... The town and village Soviets, which are directly elected, are municipal authorities whose range of action and methods of work do not greatly differ from those of municipal bodies elsewhere ... The atmosphere of a Soviet Election in Moscow is, accordingly, rather nearer to that of an English municipal election than to that of a Parliamentary General Election ... The atmosphere of the election and, indeed, of debates in the Soviets themselves, is strangely remote from "politics" as Western democracies conceive them. A big family, animated by a single purpose, sits down on these occasions to administer its common property ... The final stage in a Russian Election is the general meeting which adopts the candidates and gives them their mandates ... I think that in any event unanimity would have been attained, which, indeed, is the purpose of elections in Russia.

The elections were noteworthy for a number of reasons. In the aftermath, peasants were moving closer to the government, accepting more of its policies as beneficial, the Jewish population gained more representation, and party purges were on the horizon.

== Campaign ==
The elections were held under a one-party state, as "any party except the Communist party [was] illegal within the country" but campaigns still included unpleasantness, as the Trotskyists complained that the Communist Party of the Soviet Union (CPSU) was losing "control of the legislative bodies," which Stalin's dictatorship fervently denied, and there was "the disfranchising of 142,000 citizens...who were permitted to vote last year," some of whom were peasants. Around this time, some of the citizenry were engaging in anti-communist actions and voted against CPSU candidates, worrying the Soviet government deeply.

Some in rural areas tried to rouse public sentiment against the CPSU but this was unsuccessful as religious members, like priests and deacons, gained rights to vote in the elections, whilst certain individuals were disenfranchised for opposing the goals of Soviet ideology.
