= George MacDonald Sacko =

Liberian footballer

George MacDonald Sacko, Sr.
Personal information
- Date of birth: 19 May 1936
- Place of birth: Liberia, West Africa
- Date of death: 17 September 2011 (aged 75)
- Place of death: Newark, New Jersey, United States
- Position: Striker

George MacDonald Sacko (19 May 1936 – 17 September 2011) was a Liberian football striker.
