= 1869 in Liberia =

- Decades: 1840s; 1850s; 1860s; 1870s; 1880s
- See also: Other events of 1869; Timeline of Liberian history

The following lists events that happened during 1869 in Liberia.

== Incumbents ==
- President: James Spriggs Payne
- Vice President: Joseph Gibson
- Chief Justice: C. L. Parsons

== Events ==
=== May ===
- May 4 – Liberian term of office referendum, 1869

=== Full date unknown ===
- Arthington is settled.
- The True Whig Party is founded in Clay-Ashland.

== Births ==
- December 6 – Momulu Massaquoi, Vai monarch and Liberian diplomat, in Jabacca, Grand Cape Mount County (d. 1938)
