= Eugenia A. Wordsworth-Stevenson =

Liberian diplomat

Eugenia A. Wordsworth-Stevenson (died October 30, 2009) was a Liberian diplomat. She was ambassador to the United States.

She was a sponsor of Transafrica.
