= 1885 in Liberia =

- Decades: 1860s; 1870s; 1880s; 1890s; 1900s
- See also: Other events of 1885; Timeline of Liberian history

The following lists events that happened during 1885 in Liberia.

== Incumbents ==
- President: Hilary R. W. Johnson
- Vice President: James Thompson
- Chief Justice: C. L. Parsons

== Events ==
=== March ===
- Full Date Unknown – Great Britain seizes Liberian territory west of the Mano River, and it becomes part of the Colony of Sierra Leone.

=== May ===
- May 5 - Liberian general election, 1885
