= 2018 in Liberia =

- Decades: 1990s; 2000s; 2010s; 2020s
- See also: Other events of 2018; Timeline of Liberian history

Events in the year 2018 in Liberia.

== Incumbents ==
- President: Ellen Johnson Sirleaf (until 22 January); George Weah, taking over from 22 January.
- Vice President: Joseph Boakai (until 22 January); Jewel Taylor, taking over from 22 January.
- Chief Justice: Francis S. Korkpor, Sr.

== Events ==
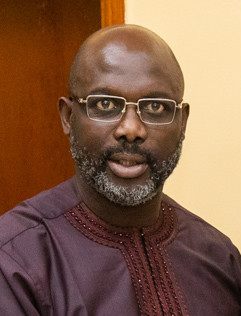
George Weah

=== January ===
- January 22 – George Weah takes the oath of office, having won the second round of the presidential election in December.

=== March ===
- March 23 – The House of Representatives holds a political peace and reconciliation dialogue at the Capitol with support from UNMIL and the Foundation For International Dignity (FIND) to foster national reconciliation among the 54th Legislature.
- March 26 – President George Weah tours Balli Island with plans to transform it into a modern city, including a proposed International Conference Center.
- March 27 –
  - UNESCO releases a curriculum handbook for Liberia’s TVET sector to guide vocational instructors in standardized teaching.
  - US President Trump announces the end of special legal status for Liberian immigrants, starting a 12-month period before potential deportations.
- March 30 – The mandate of the United Nations Mission in Liberia ends.

=== June ===
- June 22 – Amnesty International, Human Rights Watch, and Global Witness call for reforms to the Kimberley Process, citing Liberia’s history with diamond-fueled conflict.

=== July ===
- July 9 – During a session before the United Nations Human Rights Committee in Geneva, the Liberian government pledges for the first time to issue a public statement on accountability for crimes committed during the country’s civil wars.
- July 26 – Minister of Finance and Development Planning Samuel Tweah serves as national Independence Day orator.

=== August ===
- The House of Representatives votes to impeach Associate Justice Kabineh Ja’neh, creating a conflict with the Supreme Court over judicial authority.

=== September ===
- September 20 – Eighty Liberian, regional, and international NGOs release a letter calling on President George Weah to support justice and reparations for victims of civil war crimes ahead of his scheduled UN General Assembly address.

=== October ===
- October 15 – Katie Meyler steps down as CEO of More Than Me; the Liberian charity and Liberian government announce investigations and pledge support for the sexual abuse victims.
