= Daniel E. Cassell =

Liberian psychologist, business consultant, and politician (1966–2022)

- Born: 8 January 1966; Monrovia, Liberia
- Died: 25 December 2022 (aged 56); United States
- Education: Temple University; A.T. Still University; Northcentral University
- Occupations: Psychologist, business consultant and politician
- Political party: People's Liberation Party
- Criminal charges: Fraud
- Children: 5

Daniel E. Cassell (8 January 1966 – 25 December 2022) was a Liberian psychologist, business consultant, and politician. He was the founding member of Liberia's People's Liberation Party.

== Business career ==
Cassell founded Kwenyan Professional Health Services, a mental health/behavioral and substance abuse agency. He likewise worked as a Behavioral Specialist Consultant in the Philadelphia and Bucks County areas in the United States. In 2008, he became licensed as a professional counselor in Pennsylvania and became a licensed clinical drugs and alcohol counselor in New Jersey in 2009. This enabled him to begin his career in private practice. After a year in private practice, his agency was approved by the New Jersey Division of Child Behavioral Health as an intensive in-home and community provider.

== Politics ==
The People's Liberation Party (PLP) was certificated by the National Elections Commission on 21 December 2020. Its founder, Cassell served as the party's first political leader and standard bearer. In 2022, Cassell announced his intention to run for president of Liberia in the 2023 election with the PLP.

== Arrest ==
Cassell worked as a behavior specialist consultant in the United States, where he established Kwenyan Professional Health Services, a mental health, behavioral and substance abuse agency. His agency on many occasions billed insurance companies multiple times, including times when services were not performed. Cassell's company allegedly created fake vouchers for clients to the insurance company multiple times resulting in US$3.7 million. Cassell was arrested in Georgia on 17 March 2022 as a fugitive and was detained at the Essex County prison in New Jersey.
