= 1943 in Liberia =

- Decades: 1920s; 1930s; 1940s; 1950s; 1960s
- See also: Other events of 1943; Timeline of Liberian history

The following lists events that happened during 1943 in Liberia.

== Incumbents ==
- President: Edwin Barclay
- Vice President: James Skivring Smith, Jr.
- Chief Justice: F. E. R. Johnson

== Events ==
=== May ===
- May 4 - A general election and constitutional referendum were held. William Tubman was elected president and Charles L. Simpson was elected vice-president.

=== June ===
- June 8 - Liberia signs a lend-lease agreement with the United States for mutual assistance during and after World War II.

=== December ===
- December 31 - Liberia and the United States sign an agreement to build the Free Port of Monrovia as the primary port of Liberia.
