= Charles A. Clarke =

Liberia politician (1941–2022)

Charles Amstard Clarke (15 December 1941 – 18 October 2022) was a Liberian politician.

Clarke was born on 15 December 1941 in Greenville, Sinoe County. Studying in the United States, he completed a B.A. degree at Ohio State University in 1966 and a M.A. degree at Ohio University in 1970. He worked as assistant professor in Public Administration at the Federal City College 1972–1974. In 1974 he completed a PhD in Public University at the American University.

In 1974 he was named Deputy Minister for Presidential Affairs in the William R. Tolbert, Jr. government. In 1976 he was promoted to Minister of State without Portfolio, a post he held until the 1980 coup d'etat.

In the 1980s he was active as a businessman. In the 1990s he became involved in Unity Party. As of the 2000s, Clarke was the chairman of the Unity Party. He served as the senior warden of St. Thomas Episcopal Church in Monrovia. He contested the Senate seat election in 2005 from Sinoe County, obtaining 3,598 votes (11.7%).

Clarke died in Rockville, Maryland, United States on 18 October 2022.
