= Dougbeh Chris Nyan =

Liberian physician

Dougbeh Chris Nyan is a Liberian medical doctor, a biomedical research scientist, social activist and inventor. He specializes in infectious disease research.

== Education ==
Nyan studied chemistry and zoology at the College of Science and Technology of the University of Liberia. He holds a degree in human-medicine (infectious diseases) from Humboldt-University Berlin, Germany. Nyan did his post-doctoral fellowship as a biomedical scientist at the National Institutes of Health (NIH), USA and the University of Pennsylvania, USA.

Nyan is an activist for democracy and social justice. He was imprisoned by the Liberian military government of General Samuel Doe and afterwards, in 1988, exiled.

In 2014, Nyan was head of the Diaspora Liberian Emergency Response Task Force on the Ebola Crisis. The team of Liberian professionals and diaspora organizations was fighting the Ebola outbreak in Liberia and surrounding areas.

== US Food and Drug Administration ==
Until 2014, Nyan was a scientist at the Laboratory of Emerging Pathogens of the Division of Emerging and Transfusion Transmitted Diseases at the US Food and Drug Administration (FDA).

In September 2014 Nyan gave a congressional testimony on the Ebola outbreak. After testifying before United States House Foreign Affairs Subcommittee on Africa, Global Health, Global Human Rights and International Organizations, his fellowship was terminated. In an interview Nyan mentioned he was never told what raised the FDA's disapproval. When the FDA removed his name from a scientific research paper and the development of a medical test he filed a complaint against FDA.

Congressman Lamar Smith, Chairman of the US Oversight Committee on Science, Space, and Technology, initiated an inquiry process. After two years, in October 2016, the FDA returned the patent documents to Nyan. Nyan invented a rapid diagnostic test that detects Ebola, HIV, Zika, Plasmodium (Malaria), Yellow Fever virus, Dengue virus, Hepatitis B, C, and E, and West Nile virus. The test can detect three to seven infections simultaneously in 10 to 40 minutes.

== Awards ==
- July 26, 2016, Nyan received the Humane Order of African Redemption from Liberian President Ellen Johnson-Sirleaf
- July 2017 Innovation Prize for Africa for Social Impact

== Private life ==
Nyan has four children.
