= 2015 in Liberia =

- Decades: 1990s; 2000s; 2010s; 2020s
- See also: Other events of 2015; Timeline of Liberian history

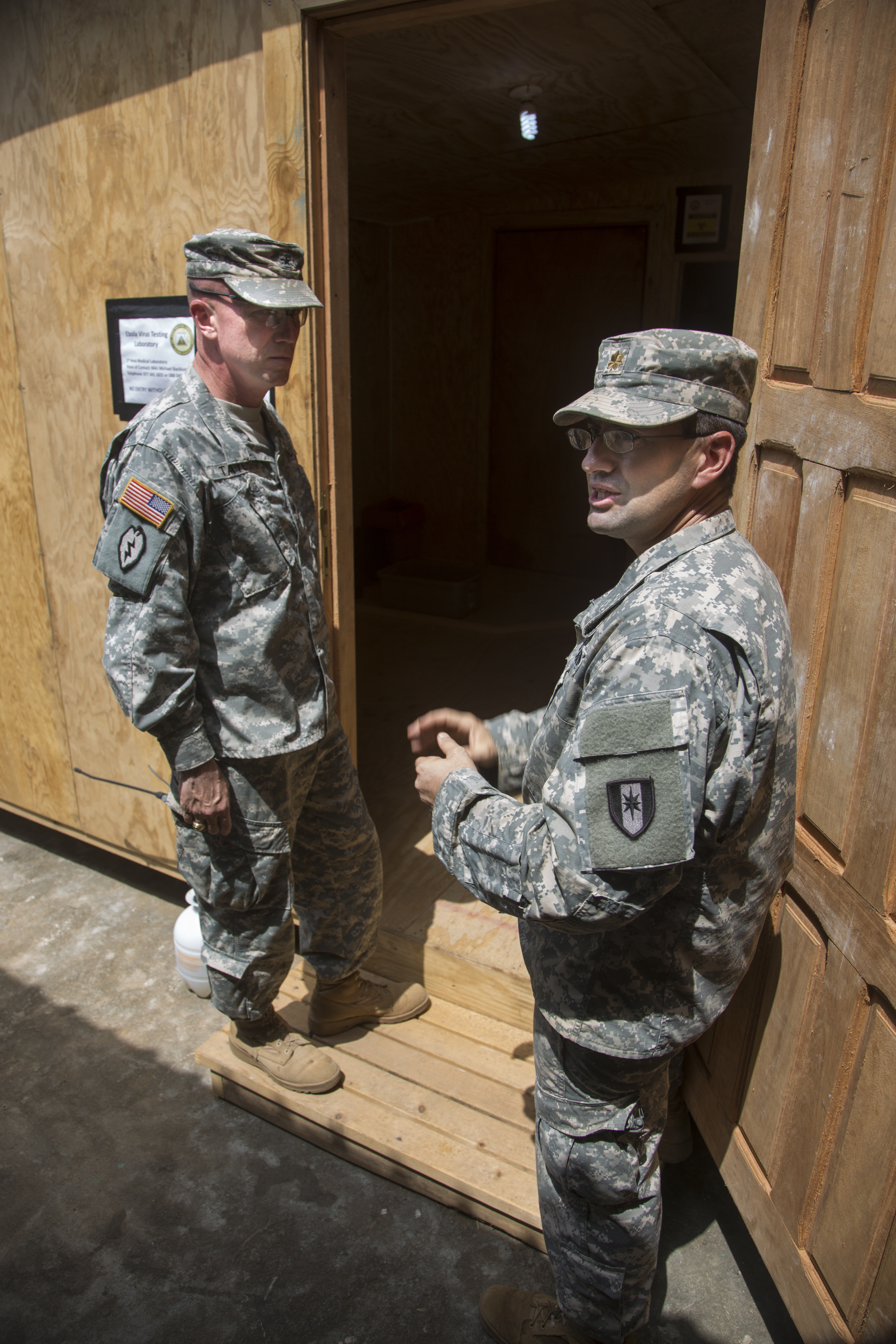
U. S. army personnel touring the U.S. Army Ebola testing lab in Greenville, Liberia.

The following lists events that happened during 2015 in Liberia.

== Incumbents ==
- President: Ellen Johnson Sirleaf
- Vice President: Joseph Boakai
- Chief Justice: Francis S. Korkpor, Sr.

== Events ==
=== February ===
- February 20 - Liberia lifts curfews and reopens borders from Sunday as the Ebola epidemic begins to end.

=== March ===
- March 5 - Liberia's last known ebola patient is discharged from a treatment center in Monrovia.

=== May ===
- May 9 - The World Health Organization declares that the outbreak of the Ebola virus has ceased in Liberia after weeks of no cases.

== Deaths ==
- January 21 - Johnnie Lewis, Liberian lawyer and politician; 18th Chief Justice of Liberia (b. 1946)
- July 20 - Kafumba Konneh, Liberian Muslim cleric and member of the Truth and Reconciliation Commission of Liberia
