= Bill Horace =

Liberian fighter (c. 1976–2020)

Bill Horace (c. 1976 – June 21, 2020) was a Liberian fighter, a former member of the National Patriotic Front of Liberia (NPFL) and alleged war criminal.

He fled to Canada in 2002 and was killed in his home in London, Ontario in 2020.

== Early life ==
Horace was born around 1976 in Buchanan, Liberia. At the age of 12 he fled Buchanan as the NPFL took over the area, he later joined the NPFL.

== Liberian civil war ==
In the early 1990s, during the First Liberian Civil War, Horace was a General in Charles Taylor's NPFL and was reported to have participated in or ordered massacres, executions, crucifixions, and the recruitment of child soldiers, primarily in Maryland County. Many of these activities were documented in Liberia's Truth and Reconciliation Commission and the Commission's final report recommended that he face justice, but the recommendations of the Commission's report were never implemented. In 1993-1994 word of Horace's activities in Maryland County eventually reached Taylor, who sent a team to remove Horace, who then fled to the Ivory Coast.

== Move to Canada ==
Horace moved to Canada in 2002 and applied for refugee status, which was rejected in 2005, and also applied for permanent residency. Through the 2010s he was investigated by the Canadian government for war crimes, stalling his immigration proceedings. He lived in Toronto and then in London, Ontario until his death.

== Death ==
In the early hours of 21 June 2020, Horace was fatally shot in his home in a planned attack. In July, 23-year-old Keiron Gregory was identified as one of the four men who had broken into Horace's home, and was arrested and charged. Though speculated that his killing was linked to activities in Liberia, Canadian authorities stated his death was presumed linked to a network of criminal fraudsters in Canada. Gregory was initially charged with second-degree murder but pled guilty in 2022 to a lesser manslaughter charge and was sentenced to ten years' imprisonment.

== Family ==
Horace was married and lived with his two children, who were 4 and 9 years old when he was killed.
