= 1927 Dominican Republic Constitutional Assembly election =

Election in the Dominican Republic

Constitutional Assembly elections were held in the Dominican Republic on 1 June 1927. The role of the Assembly was to review and amend certain articles of the constitution. This assembly amended the constitution so president and vice president's terms would extend six years. This assembly, however, was elected by Congress, not the general population, and thus had invalided Constitutional procedures.

The election had been boycotted by supporters of Vice President Federico Velásquez as he objected to the term length being increased. Following the amendments, the Vice President would be considered as having resigned if they did not take a new oath of office. This meant Velásquez lost office as he did not take the oath.
