= Tom Kamara =

Liberian journalist (1949–2012)

- Born: Thomas Saah Kamara; 1949; Sodu, Lofa County, Liberia
- Died: June 8, 2012 (aged 62–63); Brussels, Belgium
- Education: University of Liberia: University of Texas
- Occupation: Journalist
- Spouse: Rachael Kamara
- Awards: One man can make a difference Award; Titus Brandsma Award (2001)

Thomas Saah Kamara (1949 in Sodu, Lofa County, Liberia – June 8, 2012, in Brussels, Belgium) was a Liberian journalist. He was best known for advocating freedom of press and openly criticizing the regimes of Samuel Doe and Charles Taylor. Kamara founded the independent Liberian newspaper the New Democrat. Due to political persecution in his home country, he spent eight years in exile in the Netherlands.

== Early life and education ==
Kamara was a Kissi from the village Sodu, located in Lofa County in northwestern Liberia. He attended primary school in Lofa County and then went to William V.S. Tubman high school in Monrovia, where he was the first editor of the school's newspaper. He began his professional career as a reporter for the Liberian Star. He studied at the University of Liberia and later went to the United States to study journalism at the University of Texas.

== Life ==
Kamara returned to Liberia in 1981 and became the editor of the New Liberia, the official newspaper of the People's Redemption Council. In 1984, he was imprisoned by the National Security Agency for allegedly organizing the distribution of regime-critical leaflets. Without formal charge, he was supposed to be moved to the high-security prison Belle Yella, presumably to be killed en route. However, the officer in charge of flying the plane refused on the basis that there were no legal papers on his case. Kamara managed to escape and attempted to flee to his brother in the United States using a false passport. He was arrested by Dutch authorities at Schiphol Airport. Jacques Keiren and Catholic priest Geert Bles were able to prove Kamara’s identity using an article of The New African. He was granted political asylum and lived in the Netherlands during the following years.

After Samuel Doe’s assassination in 1990, Kamara returned to Liberia. He continued to be targeted by the Independent National Patriotic Front of Liberia (INPFL). In 1990, Kamara encountered INPFL leader Prince Johnson at Bushrod Island, who questioned him and wanted to kill him. While escaping, Kamara was shot in the leg and badly wounded. His injuries were not immediately attended to and the Red Cross flew him to the Netherlands for treatment.

In 1993, during the First Liberian Civil War, Kamara founded the newspaper the New Democrat. The editorial office was burned down by rebels under Charles Taylor in 1996. The newspaper was shut down in 2000 and Kamara received death threats. He went into exile to Ghana and then to the Netherlands. After all other editors of the New Democrat fled to Ghana, the New Democrat was published exclusively online. In 2005, Kamara and his wife Rachael returned to Liberia. Supported by Dutch organizations Free Voice and OneMen, the New Democrat could be printed again.

In 2010, the New Democrat published a story where they accused the Consolidated Group, a company of former president Charles Taylor, of purchasing "useless" road equipment for the government. Following these accusations of corruption, the New Democrat was found guilty of libeling and fined US$900,000. The World Association of Newspapers and News Publishers and the World Editors Forum protested the fine and urged President Ellen Johnson Sirleaf to consider a punishment proportionate to the damages. In February 2012, Kamara was appointed as member of the board of directors of National Port Authority by President Sirleaf. He refused the offer citing other responsibilities.

== Death and aftermath ==
On June 8, 2012, Kamara collapsed at Brussels International Airport while on his way to the Netherlands to receive medical treatment. He fell into a coma and died later that day at St. Luc hospital. On June 10, a memorial service was held for him at St. Andrew’s Cathedral in Heerlen. The Tom Kamara Foundation was founded in his memory in June 2013. In 2021, the foundation published a selection of Kamara's articles titled “This, Too, Is Liberia”.
