= Munah Pelham-Youngblood =

Liberian politician (1983–2020)

Rep. Munah E. Pelham-Youngblood

Member of the House of Representatives of Liberia
- In office 2012–2020
- Preceded by: Moses Saah Tandanpolie Sr.
- Succeeded by: Frank Saah Foko Jr.
- Constituency: Montserrado-9

Personal details
- Born: Munah Evangeline Pelham; 22 September 1983 Liberia
- Died: 8 July 2020 (aged 36) Accra, Ghana
- Party: Congress for Democratic Change
- Spouse(s): Dr. Raymond Youngblood, Jr.
- Children: Sarafina Munah Youngblood
- Education: University Of Liberia
- Committees: Women Legislative Caucus of Liberia | Contracts, Monopolies, Public Procurement & Concession | Gender, Child Protection & Social Welfare | Youth & Sports | Foreign Affairs | Oil & Gas, Banking & Currency | Rules Order & Administration | Secretary General Montserrado County Legislative Caucus | Financial Secretary Women Legislative Caucus of Liberia/Congress For Democratic Change/Legislative Caucus | St. Philomena Lady Auxiliary #306 Knights of St John International
- Nickname: The King Maker

Munah Evangeline Pelham-Youngblood (22 September 1983 – 8 July 2020) was a Liberian politician. She was elected twice to the Liberian House of Representatives. She was the youngest person ever elected to the Liberian parliament. A partisan of the Congress for Democratic Change, she belonged to the inner circle of President George Weah.

== Early life and family ==
Munah Evangeline Pelham was born on 22 September 1983. Her parents were Col. Walter Maxwell Pelham Sr., a senior Liberian National Police officer and head coach of the Liberia national football team, and Elizabeth Pelham, Comptroller of the House of Representatives. She was married to international gold miner Dr. Raymond Youngblood, Jr. in 2013. Hon. Pelham-Youngblood and her husband have one daughter Sarafina Munah Youngblood. Munah Pelham-Youngblood earned a B.Sc. degree in mass communications and a master's degree in international relations from the University of Liberia.

Before being introduced into politics by her husband Pelham-Youngblood worked as a fashion and runway model. She was a beauty queen, and represented Liberia in Miss Malaika International 2004 and Miss Silverbird International in 2005. She was the first runner-up in the Miss Liberia contest of 2005.

== Parliamentarian ==
Pelham-Youngblood was elected to the House of Representatives from the 9th District of Montserrado County in the 2011 Liberian general election, at the age of 27, she defeated 20 candidates in the 2011 elections, and as the incumbent in the 2017 Liberian general election, standing as a Congress for Democratic Change candidate she defeated 13 candidates.

In the House of the Representatives, she chaired the committee on the Executive. After the election of George Weah as President of Liberia, she organized the 2018 and 2019 State of the Nation addresses of President Weah. She co-chaired the Women's Legislative Caucus (and later served as the financial secretary of the Women's Legislative Caucus) and the Committee on Contracts, Monopolies, Public Procurement & Concession, and was a member of the Committees on Gender, Child Protection & Social Welfare, Youth & Sports, Foreign Affairs, Oil & Gas, Banking & Currency, Rules Order & Administration. She served as the secretary general of the Montserrado County Legislative Caucus. She chaired the Liberian chapter of the World Bank/IMF Parliamentary Network.

== Illness and death ==
Pelham-Youngblood reportedly fell ill in mid-April 2018 and travelled out of Liberia for medical treatment, visiting Ghana and Ivory Coast before going to India. While receiving treatment in India, rumours spread on Liberian social media of her death, provoking a rebuttal from her family.

Pelham-Youngblood returned to Liberia on 18 July 2018. A thanksgiving service was held at Lakpazee Community Church in Lakpazee, Sinkor, Monrovia to celebrate her return. In 2019, she was out of Liberia for ten months for medical treatment. She died in Accra, Ghana, on 8 July 2020, aged 36.
