= 2009 in Liberia =

- Decades: 1980s; 1990s; 2000s; 2010s; 2020s
- See also: Other events of 2009; Timeline of Liberian history

Events in the year 2009 in Liberia.

== Incumbents ==
- President: Ellen Johnson Sirleaf
- Vice President: Joseph Boakai
- Chief Justice: Johnnie Lewis

== Events ==
- January 20 – The microfinance bank AccessBank Liberia is established.
- June 30 – The final, consolidated report of the Truth and Reconciliation Commission of Liberia is made public.
- July 26 – Bong County Paramount Chief Flomo Togbah Barworor becomes the first traditional leader to serve as national independence day orator, delivering his speech in the Kpelle language.
- April 30 – Former interim President Gyude Bryant is acquitted of embezzling $1.4 million from the transitional government.
- September 15 – United Nations Security Council Resolution 1885 is unanimously adopted, which extends the mandate of the United Nations Mission in Liberia until September 30, 2010.
- November 10 – A senatorial by-election is held in Monsterrado County, and after a run-off election on November 24, Congress for Democratic Change nominee Geraldine Doe-Sheriff is elected.
- December 17 – United Nations Security Council Resolution 1903 is unanimously adopted, which adjusts the Liberian arms embargo and renews the travel ban on persons determined to be a threat to the peace process.

== Deaths ==
- February 21 – Wilton Sankawulo, former National Transitional Chairman (1995–1996), in Monrovia (b. 1937)
- June 30 – Dorothy Musuleng-Cooper, former Minister of Foreign Affairs, in Monrovia (b. 1930)
- August 3 – Hannah G. Brent, member of the Liberian Senate
- October 30 – Eugenia A. Wordsworth-Stevenson, former diplomat, in Olney, Maryland, U. S.
