= Hans Barchue =

Liberian politician (died 2023)

Hans M. Barchue (died 18 July 2023) was a Liberian politician.

== Biography ==
Barchue was first elected to the Liberian House of Representatives in 2011, where he won the Grand Bassa County #1 seat. He ran as an independent. Barchue was made Deputy Speaker in January 2012. From August to September in 2016, Barchue served as acting Speaker of the House after the resignation of Speaker Alex J. Tyler. He was re-elected in 2017, again as an independent.

On 1 June 2020, Barchue joined the Liberty Party. For the 2023 election, Barchue registered again as an independent. Before the 2023 election in October, Barchue died on 18 July 2023 in Europe Care Hospital in Monrovia, after long illness. At the time of his death, he was serving as Chairman of the Legislative Caucus of Grand Bassa County.
