= Salome Karwah =

Liberian nurse

Time magazine's 2014 "Person of the Year" with Karwah on the cover.

Salomé Karwah (c. 1988 – 21 February 2017) was a Liberian nurse who was named co-Person of the Year by Time magazine in 2014 for her efforts to combat the West African Ebola virus epidemic. She appeared on the cover of Time in December 2014 with other health care workers and colleagues working to end the epidemic. Karwah survived ebola herself, before returning to work with Médecins Sans Frontières (Doctors Without Borders) to help other patients afflicted with the disease. The actions of Karwah and other health care professionals are believed to have saved lives of thousands. However, two years later, Karwah died from complications of childbirth; her widower suggested that this might have been due to the widespread, mistaken belief that ebola survivors can still transmit the virus. Even before the ebola outbreak, Liberia had one of the highest rates of maternal mortality in the world.

== Biography ==
Karwah's father was a doctor. She met her future husband, James Harris, at a mutual friend's in 2013 after both had recently ended previous relationships. They began dating shortly afterwards.

=== Ebola work ===
One year after Karwah and Harris began dating, the West African Ebola virus epidemic struck Liberia, as well as neighboring Guinea and Sierra Leone, in 2014. Her family was among the first to become ill with ebola during the summer of 2014. Her father was the first to die from ebola, which ultimately killed both her parents and seven other relatives. Karwah, her sister, Josephine, her mother, and Harris were all soon stricken with ebola as well. Salome, Harris and Josephine Karwah were all placed in a Doctors Without Borders medical unit in Monrovia with other ebola patients to be treated. Salome Karwah's priority was to care for her sister, Josephine Manly, who was pregnant at the time she contracted ebola. Salome cared for Josephine, who nearly died, by changing her clothes and cleaning fluids that contained ebola. She withheld the news of their mother's death from Josephine, fearing that it would have a detrimental effect on her health.

By September 2014, both the Karwah sisters had recovered, determined free of the disease, and discharged from the hospital. Salome Karwah was released from the ebola unit on 28 August 2014. Karwah's boyfriend, James Harris, also recovered and was released from the medical unit a few days later. The staff at Doctors Without Borders (MSF) had noticed that Karwah and Harris had both shown an ability to care for other ebola victims, regardless of the risk to their own health, while they had been patients. Shortly after their discharge from the hospital, MSF hired them to serve as mental health counselors in their ebola units. Salome Karwah returned to the unit, this time as a counselor and nurse, one month after her release. As survivors, she and Harris had developed a natural immunity to that particular strain of ebola.

Karwah, who was interviewed on her work by NPR in 2014, recalled that "It was not hard to come back [to the Ebola treatment center]. Of course I lost my two parents here...but if I can help someone survive, I will be very happy." She remained at the unit until the end of the ebola epidemic. In October 2014, Karwah wrote a guest piece in The Guardian noting that helping others with ebola brought meaning to her life. In the same essay, Karwah reiterated that "if someone has Ebola, it isn’t good to stigmatize them, because you don’t know who is next in line to contract the virus."Time magazine named Salome Karwah as its co-Person of the Year, alongside several other "ebola fighters". She appeared on the worldwide cover of Time in December 2014 just months after being released from the hospital.

Harris and Karwah became engaged. They were married to January 2016 while Karwah was pregnant with their third child, who was born a few months later. In the summer of 2016, Karwah became pregnant with their fourth child, which they agreed would be their last. The couple, who were religious but already had three small children, thought of having an abortion, but chose to keep the baby.

=== Death from complications of childbirth ===
Salome Karwah went through a difficult pregnancy. In February 2017, Karwah underwent a caesarean section though she was suffering from high blood pressure at the time. Although she had high blood pressure, Karwah was discharged from Eternal Love Winning Africa Hospital (ELWA) on the outskirts of Monrovia several days after undergoing the caesarean. She and Harris returned to their home to care for their new infant son, Jeremiah Solomon Karwah, and their other children. Karwah continued to feel unwell, exhibit spikes in blood pressure, and confided to family members that staff at ELWA hospital had neglected her complications. Just hours after arriving home, Karwah collapsed and began foaming at the mouth.

Her husband rushed her back to ELWA hospital on the night of 19 February 2017. However, the doctor who specialized in treating ebola survivors was not on duty. Another doctor refused to treat Karwah, who remained in the car for three hours while suffering from convulsions and seizures. Harris eventually went to the emergency room himself and brought out a wheelchair to bring his wife into the hospital. According to Harris, the doctor and nurses on duty still refused to see or touch Karwah, telling him that he would have to take her to another hospital. Harris gave his account to NPR, saying ""[The doctor] was checking Facebook...I had to rush into the emergency room myself to get a wheelchair, but I was struggling to take her from the car to put her in it. Other nurses came to help me, but the doctor told me that she would not touch her, and that if [Salome] stayed [at the hospital] she would die."

He managed to contact an epidemiologist named Dr. Mosoka Fallah, who arrived at ELWA three hours later and finally admitted Karwah to the hospital. Despite his efforts, Salome Karwah, who had survived ebola, died from complications of childbirth on 21 February 2017 at the age of 28, just four days after giving birth.

Harris and Karwah's sister, Josephine, accused the ELWA staff of malpractice due to her status as a former ebola patient. They accuse the medical staff of providing inadequate care because they were afraid to touch her. Josephine Manly, Karwah's sister who also survived ebola, reiterated Harris's claims of poor treatment by hospital staff, saying "They said she was an Ebola survivor. They didn't want contact with her fluids. They all gave her distance. No one would give her an injection." Manly believes that Karwah would have survived the child birth complications if she had received proper, timely emergency medical treatment.

The mistaken belief that ebola survivors can still transmit the disease remains widespread across the country, including among medical staff, which may have contributed to Karwah's death. According to the Associated Press, the country's chief medical officer, Dr. Francis Kateh, echoed this falsehood when he told reporters that "the hospital knew she had Ebola and they operated on her, which put them at more risk."

Tributes came in from around the world, including her former employer, Médecins Sans Frontières, who wrote, "Salome's own experience of Ebola gave her incredible empathy for the patients that she worked so hard to care for...Our many staff who remember working with her speak of her strength and compassion, but also of her smile...She made a huge contribution to MSF's work at the height of the outbreak in Monrovia." Ella Watson-Stryker, a MDF health promoter and colleague of Karwah, told Time magazine of the shock of her death, "To survive Ebola and then die in the larger yet silent epidemic of health system failure … I have no words." Karwah's life was remembered on BBC Radio 4's obituary programme Last Word by Time magazine's Africa correspondent, Aryn Baker.
