= 1927 Liberian constitutional referendum =

A referendum on requirements for elections and the composition of the Supreme Court was held in Liberia on 3 May 1927. It proposed to alter the requirements to stand for election, and to expand the Supreme Court from one Chief Justice and two associates to one Chief and four associates. It was approved by the requisite two-thirds majority, and was passed.
