= 2024 in Liberia =

- Decades: 2000s; 2010s; 2020s
- See also: Other events of 2024; Timeline of Liberian history

Events in the year 2024 in Liberia.

== Incumbents ==
- President: George Weah (until 22 January); Joseph Boakai onwards
- Vice President: Jewel Taylor (until 22 January); Jeremiah Koung onwards
- Chief Justice: Sie-A-Nyene Yuoh

== Events ==
- 22 January – Joseph Boakai is inaugurated President of Liberia, succeeding outgoing President George Weah, whom he defeated in the 2023 runoff election.
- 27 March – A court in France sentences the former leader of the United Liberation Movement of Liberia for Democracy Kunti Kamara to 30 years in prison on charges of committing "crimes against humanity."
- 27 March – President Boakai signs an executive order establishing the country's first court dedicated to trying war crimes committed during the Second Liberian Civil War.
- 23 April – By-elections are held in Nimba and Grand Gedeh counties, resulting in the election of the Unity Party's Nya D. Twayen to the Senate and independent Jeremiah Garwo Sokan to the House.
- 28 August – Former Chief Justice Gloria Musu-Scott is acquitted for murder.
- 9 September – Forty-seven inmates escape from a maximum security prison in Kakata.
- 17 September – Claude Pivi, a Guinean military officer who escaped in the 2023 Conakry prison raid and is wanted for his role in the suppression of the 2009 Guinean protests, is arrested in Liberia. He is later extradited to Guinea on 19 September.
- 18 December – The building housing the Legislature of Liberia in Monrovia catches fire amid protests caused by plans to remove House of Representatives speaker Jonathan F. Koffa on corruption charges.

== Holidays ==
- 1 January - New Year's Day
- 11 February – Armed Forces Day
- 13 March – Decoration Day
- 15 March – J.J. Roberts' Birthday
- 12 April - Fast and Prayer Day
- 14 May - National Unification Day
- 26 July - Independence Day
- 24 August - Flag Day
- 7 November - Thanksgiving
- 29 November - William V. S. Tubman's Birthday
- 25 December - Christmas Day

== Deaths ==
- 19 February – Johnson Gwaikolo, member of the House of Representatives of Liberia (2018–2024), in Monrovia (b. 1955)
- 27 October – Bennie Dee Warner, vice president (1977–1980)
- 28 November – Prince Johnson, warlord and politician, senator (since 2006), in Montserrado (b. 1952)

== See also ==
- Foreign relations of Liberia
