= 2020 Liberian constitutional referendum =

A constitutional referendum was held in Liberia on 8 December 2020 alongside Senate elections and two by-elections to the House of Representatives. It had been planned for 13 October, but was postponed due to the COVID-19 pandemic. Voters were asked whether they approved of eight amendments to the constitution, voting separately on each one. Although a majority of valid votes were in favour of each proposal, the two-thirds quorum was not met for any proposal.

== Background ==
The government had planned to bundle the eight amendments into three questions, with one question on amending article 28 (citizenship), one on amending articles 45, 47, 48, 49 and 50 on the terms of office of the President, Senate and House of Representatives, and one on amending article 83 to change the date of general elections and decrease the time the Elections Commission has to investigate complaints. However, this was ruled unconstitutional by the Supreme Court, as article 92 requires amendments to be voted on separately. This was taken by many to mean the referendum was cancelled. However, Solicitor-General Syrenius Cephus claimed the ruling meant that if the questions were unbundled, the referendum could go ahead. The National Elections Commission subsequently began printing new ballot papers with the amendments separated out.

The opposition Collaborating Political Parties attempted to appeal to the Supreme Court, but were unsuccessful. Despite reports that the changes would lead to George Weah's third presidential term like in other Western African neighbors, Weah denied the move.

== Proposed amendments ==
- Article 28: Amend the constitutional rights of citizenship. Citizenship is granted automatically if both parents were Liberian citizens at the time of their birth; the amendments proposed require only one parent to be a Liberian citizen, remove the ability of the government to legislate to remove citizenship of natural born citizens and prohibit citizens with dual citizenship from holding senior positions, including justices of the Supreme Court, ministerial positions, heads of government agencies, ambassadorships and the chief of staff and deputy chief of staff of the military.
- Article 45: Reducing Senators' terms from nine to seven years
- Article 47: Reducing the term of the President of the Senate from six to five years
- Article 48: Reducing the term of the House of Representatives from six to five years.
- Article 49: Reducing the term of the Speaker of the House of Representatives from six to five years
- Article 50: Reducing the term of the President from six to five years
- Article 83: Change the date of general elections from the second Tuesday in October to the second Tuesday in November to avoid the rainy season
- Article 83: Decrease the time the Elections Commission has to investigate complaints from thirty to fifteen days

== Results ==
Partial results from a third of country's regions showed that the amendments on reducing the term of presidency and allowing dual citizenship won a majority of votes. According to the National Election Commission, voters said yes to all eight questions asked on the referendum in five of fifteen counties in the country. Final results were released on 1 April 2021, with a narrow majority in favour of all eight proposals, but none meeting the two-thirds quorum required, resulting in all proposals being rejected.

Question	For		Against		Invalid/ blank	Total votes	Registered voters	Turnout	Result
Question	Votes	%	Votes	%	Invalid/ blank	Total votes	Registered voters	Turnout	Result
Citizenship	202,017	51.43	190,814	48.57	437,170	830,001	2,476,536	33.51	Rejected (two-thirds in favour not met)
Reducing Senators' terms	227,884	54.99	186,557	45.01	415,694	830,135	2,476,536	33.51	Rejected (two-thirds in favour not met)
Reducing the term of the President of the Senate	221,236	54.80	182,515	45.20	426,399	830,150	2,476,536	33.52	Rejected (two-thirds in favour not met)
Reducing the term of the House of Representatives	220,143	55.03	179,903	44.97	430,188	830,234	2,476,536	33.52	Rejected (two-thirds in favour not met)
Reducing the term of the Speaker of the House of Representatives	217,325	54.39	182,245	45.61	430,683	830,253	2,476,536	33.52	Rejected (two-thirds in favour not met)
Reducing the term of the President	237,501	54.24	200,359	45.76	391,951	829,811	2,476,536	33.51	Rejected (two-thirds in favour not met)
Changing the date of general elections	212,016	56.75	161,590	43.25	456,785	830,391	2,476,536	33.53	Rejected (two-thirds in favour not met)
Decreasing the time the Elections Commission has to investigate complaints	176,789	50.20	175,347	49.80	478,265	830,401	2,476,536	33.53	Rejected (two-thirds in favour not met)
Source: NEC
