= 2025 in Liberia =

- Decades: 2000s; 2010s; 2020s
- See also: Other events of 2025; Timeline of Liberian history

Events in the year 2025 in Liberia.

== Incumbents ==
- President: Joseph Boakai
- Vice President: Jeremiah Koung
- Chief Justice: Sie-A-Nyene Yuoh

== Events ==
=== March ===
- 24 March – Liberia launches a digital public infrastructure project with $30 million in World Bank funding
- 25 March – The Armed Forces of Liberia launches ‘Operation True Guardian’.

=== April ===
- 3 April – Lofa County announces plans to build a stadium.
- 22 April – A by-election was held in Nimba County to replace Senator Prince Johnson. It was won by Samuel Kogar.

=== May ===
- 29 May – A private jet carrying President Joseph Boakai from Nigeria makes a rough landing at Roberts International Airport in Monrovia after its tires burst upon landing, prompting the cancellation of all overnight flights. No injuries are reported.

=== June ===
- 3 June – Liberia is elected to a rotating seat at the United Nations Security Council for the first time since 1961.

=== July ===
- 1 July – Former president William Tolbert and 13 other officials killed during the 1980 Liberian coup d'état are given a symbolic state funeral.
- 5 July – President Boakai issues an official apology to victims of the First and Second Liberian Civil Wars.

=== August ===
- 12 August – A by-election is held in Nimba County's 5th House district and is won by Kortor Kwagrue.
- 22 August – The government bans tramadol and hookahs.

=== October ===
- 24 October – Liberia agrees to accept migrant Kilmar Abrego on a temporary humanitarian basis after a U.S. request.

== Holidays ==
- 1 January – New Year's Day
- 11 February – Armed Forces Day
- 12 March – Decoration Day
- 15 March – J.J. Roberts' Birthday
- 11 April – Fast and Prayer Day
- 14 May – National Unification Day
- 26 July – Independence Day
- 24–25 August – Flag Day
- 6 November – Thanksgiving
- 29 November – William V. S. Tubman's Birthday
- 25 December – Christmas Day

== Deaths ==
- 21 May – Nancy Doe, 76, first lady (1980–1990).
- 9 August – Sylvester Grigsby, 74, acting minister of foreign affairs (2010).

== See also ==
- Foreign relations of Liberia
