= J. Nagbe Sloh =

Liberian politician (1964–2020)

Jaybloh Nagbe Sloh Sr. (9 September 1964 – 30 June 2020) was a renowned Liberian veteran political journalist later turned politician who served as a member of the House of Representatives from 2017 until his death in 2020.

Sloh was born on 9 September 1964 in Saybliah, Sinoe County, Liberia. He was educated in Montserrado County and later finished his education at Strayer University in the United States, where he moved in 1997. He later returned to serve the people of Liberia and was promoted to director of Liberia News Agency (LINA), which was where he established his career in journalism in the early 1990s.

Sloh had a passion for journalism and started his career as a young journalist in 1981. He had a natural tendency to speak the truth and educate the public and sometimes even if it meant going against the status quo or offending the masses. Sloh nicknamed himself "Town Chief," which derived from his natural ability as an orator. Sloh became an ambitious journalist once he started at LINA and represented Liberia's press and covered stories around the world.

Sloh switched to politics and was elected as representative of Sinoe County (District 2) in 2017.

A man of complex personality, he tended to speak his mind, and it sometimes offended others. He was later known as a "controversial lawmaker" because sometimes he spoke against his own very political party, and sometimes his "loose talk" and larger than life persona shadowed his political career and lifetime achievements.

Sloh married to Ruth Sloh on 8 May 1993. They had eight children—six currently living in the United States and two living in Liberia.
