= 2005 in Liberia =

- Decades: 1980s; 1990s; 2000s; 2010s; 2020s
- See also: Other events of 2005; Timeline of Liberian history

The following lists events that happened during 2005 in Liberia.

== Events ==
=== October ===
- October 2 — The Supreme Court of Liberia rules that the National Elections Commission (NEC) had erred by rejecting three candidates on grounds that their registration documents were incomplete. The court says that NEC must provide the disqualified contenders with sufficient time to correct the deficiencies that barred them from being on the ballot.
- October 11 — Liberians head for the poll today to select a new president, 30 senators and 64 representatives for the lower house of parliament.
- October 31 — Campaigning in the run-off Liberian election has begun.

=== November ===
- November 23 — Ellen Johnson Sirleaf is officially declared as the winner of the Liberian presidential runoff, after she took 59.4 percent of the vote, making her Africa's first elected female head of state.

== Deaths ==
- April 15 — George Arthur Padmore, Liberian Ambassador to the United States (1956–1961), in Silver Spring, Maryland, U. S. (b. 1915)
