= 2006 in Liberia =

- Decades: 1980s; 1990s; 2000s; 2010s; 2020s
- See also: Other events of 2006; Timeline of Liberian history

The following lists events that happened during 2006 in Liberia.

== Incumbents ==
- President: vacant (until January 16), Ellen Sirleaf Johnson (starting January 16)
- Vice President: vacant (until January 16), Joseph Boakai (starting January 16)
- Chief Justice: Henry Reed Cooper then Johnnie N. Lewis

== Events ==
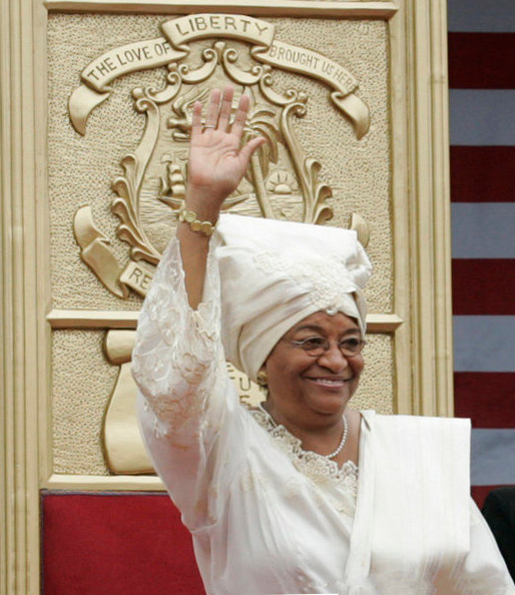
Ellen Johnson Sirleaf in 2006

=== March ===
- March 28 - Former Liberian President Charles Taylor disappears after Nigeria agrees to extradite him to face war crime charges in Sierra Leone.
- March 29 - Charles Taylor is captured after disappearing in Nigeria and is extradited to Sierra Leone.

=== June ===
- June 15 - The United Kingdom agrees to jail Charles Taylor if he is convicted, removing a key obstacle to a proposed trial to be held at The Hague under the auspices of the Special Court for Sierra Leone.
