= 2010 in Liberia =

- Decades: 1990s; 2000s; 2010s; 2020s
- See also: Other events of 2010; Timeline of Liberian history

Events in the year 2010 in Liberia.

== Incumbents ==
- President: Ellen Johnson Sirleaf
- Vice President: Joseph Boakai
- Chief Justice: Johnnie Lewis

== Events ==
- February 26 – Clashes in Voinjama between Christian and Muslim communities result in the death of four people, eighteen people being injured, and the imposition of a curfew in Lofa County by the Liberian government.
- March 18 – United States President Barack Obama extends Deferred Enforcement Departure to Liberian nationals through September 2011.
- May 27 – The Gender Equity in Politics Act, which sought increase women's involvement in politics by mandating 30% of the elected officials to be women is proposed in the Legislature of Liberia.
- May 28 – Alleged Russian drug smuggler, Konstantin Yaroshenko, is arrested by Liberian authorities.
- June 29 – Liberia receives $4.6 billion of debt relief from the International Monetary Fund and the World Bank.
- July 26 – Catholic Prelate Robert Tikpor serves as the national Independence Day orator.
- September 15 – The United Nations Security Council extends the mandate of the United Nations Mission in Liberia by one year.
- September 16 – The Paris Club pardons $1.2 billion dollars of Liberia's debt.
- November 3 – President Sirleaf dismisses her cabinet.
- December 17 – The United Nations Security Council unanimously adopts resolution 1961, renewing its arms embargo on Liberia for a year.

== Deaths ==
- August 19 – David D. Kpormakpor, former chairman of the Interim Council of State and Supreme Court justice, in New York City, U. S. (b. 1935)
