= List of wars involving Liberia =

This is a list of wars involving the Republic of Liberia.

Conflict	Combatant 1	Combatant 2	Result
Liberian–Grebo War (1875–1876)	Liberia Supported by: United States	Grebo people	Victory
Kru Coast Revolt (1915–1916)	Liberia Supported by: United States	Kru people	Victory
World War I (1914–1918)	Allied Powers; France; Britain: United Kingdom; Canada; Australia; New Zealand; India; South Africa; Russia (1914–17); Japan; Italy (1915–18); United States (1917–18); Serbia; Montenegro; Belgium; Romania (1916–18); Portugal (1916–18); Brazil (1917–18); Hejaz (1916–18); China (1917–18); Greece (1917–18) (Thailand) Siam (1917–18); Liberia (1917–18)	Central Powers; German Empire; Austria-Hungary; Ottoman Empire; Bulgaria (1915–18)	Victory
World War II (1939–45)	Allied Powers; Soviet Union (from June 1941); United States (from December 1941); United Kingdom; China; France (1939–40, 1944–45) In exile for part of the war Poland; Norway; Netherlands; Belgium; Free France (1940–44); Luxembourg; Greece; Czechoslovakia Other important belligerents Canada; India; Australia; New Zealand; South Africa; Yugoslavia; Liberia; Ethiopia; Brazil; Mexico; Colombia; Cuba; Philippines; Mongolia Co-belligerents Italy (1943–1945); Romania (1944–1945); Finland (1944–1945); Bulgaria (1944–1945)	Axis powers Germany; Italy (1940–43); Japan Affiliate states Romania (1941–44); Hungary (from 1941); Bulgaria (1941–44); Thailand (1942–45) Client states Slovakia; Croatia; Manchukuo; Mengjiang; Albania Co-belligerents Finland (1941–44) Iraq (1941) Vichy France (1940–44) Active neutrality Soviet Union (1939–41) Spain (1941–44)	Victory
1980 Liberian coup d'état (1980)	Liberia	Faction of the Armed Forces of Liberia	Coup attempt succeeds
First Liberian Civil War (1989–1997)	(Liberia) Liberian government: (Liberia) Loyalist Armed Forces elements; (Liberia) ULIMO (1991–1994): (Liberia) ULIMO-K (1994–1996); (Liberia) ULIMO-J (1994–1996); (Liberia) LPC (1993–1996) (Liberia) LUDF (later becoming ULIMO) (Liberia) LDF (1993–1996); Supported by: ECOMOG: Nigeria (from 1990); Ghana (from 1990); Guinea (from 1990); The Gambia (from 1990); Sierra Leone (1990–1991); (United Nations) UNOMIL (September 22, 1993 – September 12, 1997)	Anti-Doe Armed Forces elements (Liberia) NPFL (Liberia) INPFL (1989–1992) (Liberia) NPFL-CRC (1994–1996); Supported by: Libya; Burkina Faso; RUF	NPFL Victory: Overthrow of the Doe government in 1990; Charles Taylor elected President of Liberia in 1997
Sierra Leone Civil War (1991–2002)	RUF; (Sierra Leone) AFRC (1997–2002); West Side Boys (1998–2000); Liberia (1997–2002); NPFL (1991–2002); Foreign mercenaries; Supported by: Libya; Burkina Faso	Sierra Leone; SLA (before and after the AFRC); CDF (Kamajors, Tamaboros, Kapras, etc.); Foreign mercenaries; United Kingdom (2000–2002); Guinea; ECOMOG forces (1998–2000); Executive Outcomes (1995–1996); Supported by: United States; Belarus; (United Nations) UNAMSIL; Bangladesh; India; Pakistan (2001–2005); Kenya; Russia (1999–2005); Ukraine (1999–2005); Nigeria; Norway; New Zealand; Ghana; Jordan; Germany	Defeat: Commonwealth victory
1998 Monrovia clashes (1998)	(Liberia) Liberian government (Taylor loyalists)	(Liberia) Johnson's forces (ex-ULIMO-J); Limited involvement: Nigeria; United States	Partial victory of Charles Taylor: Monrovia purged of Roosevelt Johnson's followers; Mass killings of Krahn, which contribute to the Second Liberian Civil War's outbreak
Second Liberian Civil War (1999–2003)	(Liberia) Liberian government: Loyalist Armed Forces elements; ATU; SOD; SSS; NPFL/NPP militias; RUF; RDFG	(Liberia) Rebel groups: Anti-Taylor Armed Forces elements; LURD; MODEL; Guinea; Sierra Leone; Supported by: Ivory Coast; United Kingdom; United States	Rebel victory: Resignation of Charles Taylor and subsequent exile; Transitional Government of Liberia installed; Accra Peace Agreement signed; United Nations Mission in Liberia deployed

== See also ==
- Ivory Coast expedition
