= History of Liberia =

Liberia is a country in West Africa founded by free people of color from the United States. The emigration of African Americans, both freeborn and recently emancipated, was funded and organized by the American Colonization Society (ACS). The mortality rate of these settlers was the highest among settlements reported with modern recordkeeping. Of the 4,571 emigrants who arrived in Liberia between 1820 and 1843, only 1,819 survived (39.8%).

In 1846, the first black governor of Liberia, Joseph Jenkins Roberts, requested the Liberian legislature to declare independence, but in a manner that would allow them to maintain contacts with the ACS. The legislature called for a referendum, in which Liberians chose independence. On July 26, 1847, a group of eleven signatories declared Liberia an independent nation. The ACS as well as several northern state governments and local colonization chapters continued to provide money and emigrants as late as the 1870s. The United States government declined to act upon requests from the ACS to make Liberia an American colony or to establish a formal protectorate over Liberia, but it did exercise a "moral protectorate" over Liberia, intervening when threats manifested towards Liberian territorial expansion or sovereignty. Upon Liberian independence, Roberts was elected as the first president of Liberia.

Liberia retained its independence throughout the Scramble for Africa by European colonial powers during the late 19th century, while remaining in the American sphere of influence. President William Howard Taft made American support to Liberia a priority of his foreign policy. From the 1920s, the economy focused on exploitation of natural resources. The rubber industry, specifically the Firestone Company, dominated the economy. Until 1980, Liberia was controlled politically by descendants of the original African-American settlers, known collectively as Americo-Liberians, who made up a small minority of the population. The violent overthrow of the Americo-Liberian regime that year led to two civil wars that devastated the country, the first from 1989 to 1997 and the second from 1999 to 2003.

== Early history (pre-1821) ==
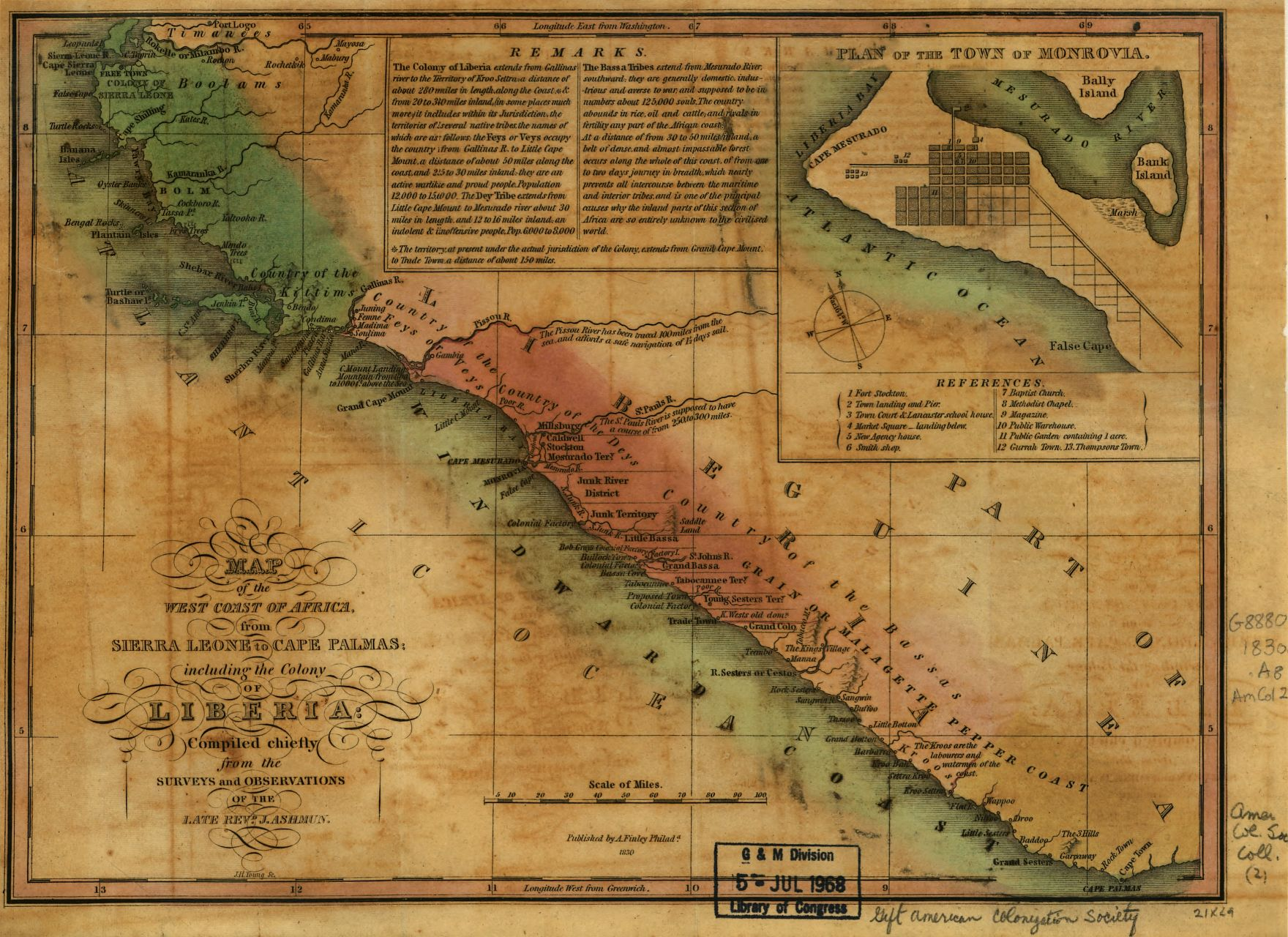
Map of Liberia circa 1830

Historians believe that many of the indigenous peoples of Liberia migrated there from the north and east between the 12th and 16th centuries AD. Portuguese explorers established contacts with people of the land later known as "Liberia" as early as 1462. They named the area Costa da Pimenta (Pepper Coast), or Grain Coast, because of the abundance of melegueta pepper, which became desired in European cooking.

In 1602, the Dutch established a trading post at Grand Cape Mount but destroyed it a year later. In 1663, the English established a few trading posts on the Pepper Coast. No further known settlements by Europeans occurred until the arrival in 1821 of free blacks from the United States.

== Colonization (1821–1847) ==
From around 1800, in the United States, people opposed to slavery were planning ways to liberate more slaves and, ultimately, to abolish the practice. At the same time, slaveholders in the South opposed having free blacks in their states, as they believed the free people threatened the stability of their slave societies. Slaves were gradually freed in the North, although more slowly than generally realized; there were hundreds of slaves in Northern states in the 1840 census, and in New Jersey, in the 1860 census. The former slaves and other free blacks suffered considerable social and legal discrimination; they were not citizens and were seen by many as unwanted foreigners who were taking jobs away from white people by working for less. Like Southern states, some Northern states and territories severely restricted or prohibited altogether entry by free blacks. This was, for example, the case in Illinois, and was proposed for Kansas under the Lecompton Constitution.

Some abolitionists, including distinguished blacks such as ship builder Paul Cuffe (or Cuffee), believed that blacks should return to "the African homeland", as if it were one ethnicity and country, despite many having generations of ancestors living in the United States. Cuffe's dream was that free African Americans and freed slaves "could establish a prosperous colony in Africa," one based on emigration and trade. In 1811, Cuffe founded the Friendly Society of Sierra Leone, a cooperative black group intended to encourage “the Black Settlers of Sierra Leone, and the Natives of Africa generally, in the Cultivation of their Soil, by the Sale of their Produce.” As historian Donald R. Wright put it, "Cuffee hoped to send at least one vessel each year to Sierra Leone, transporting African-American settlers and goods to the colony and returning with marketable African products." However, Cuffe died in 1817, and with him his project.

The first ship of the American Colonization Society, the Elizabeth, departed New York on February 6, 1820, for West Africa carrying 86 settlers. Between 1821 and 1838, the American Colonization Society developed the first settlement, which would be known as Liberia. On July 26, 1847, Liberia declared itself a (free) sovereign nation.

=== First ideas of colonization ===
As early as the period of the American Revolution, many white members of American society thought that African Americans could not succeed in living in their society as free people. Many considered blacks physically and mentally inferior to whites, and others believed that the racism and societal polarization resulting from slavery were insurmountable obstacles for integration of the races. Thomas Jefferson was among those who proposed colonization in Africa: relocating free blacks outside the new nation.

=== Colonies in Africa ===
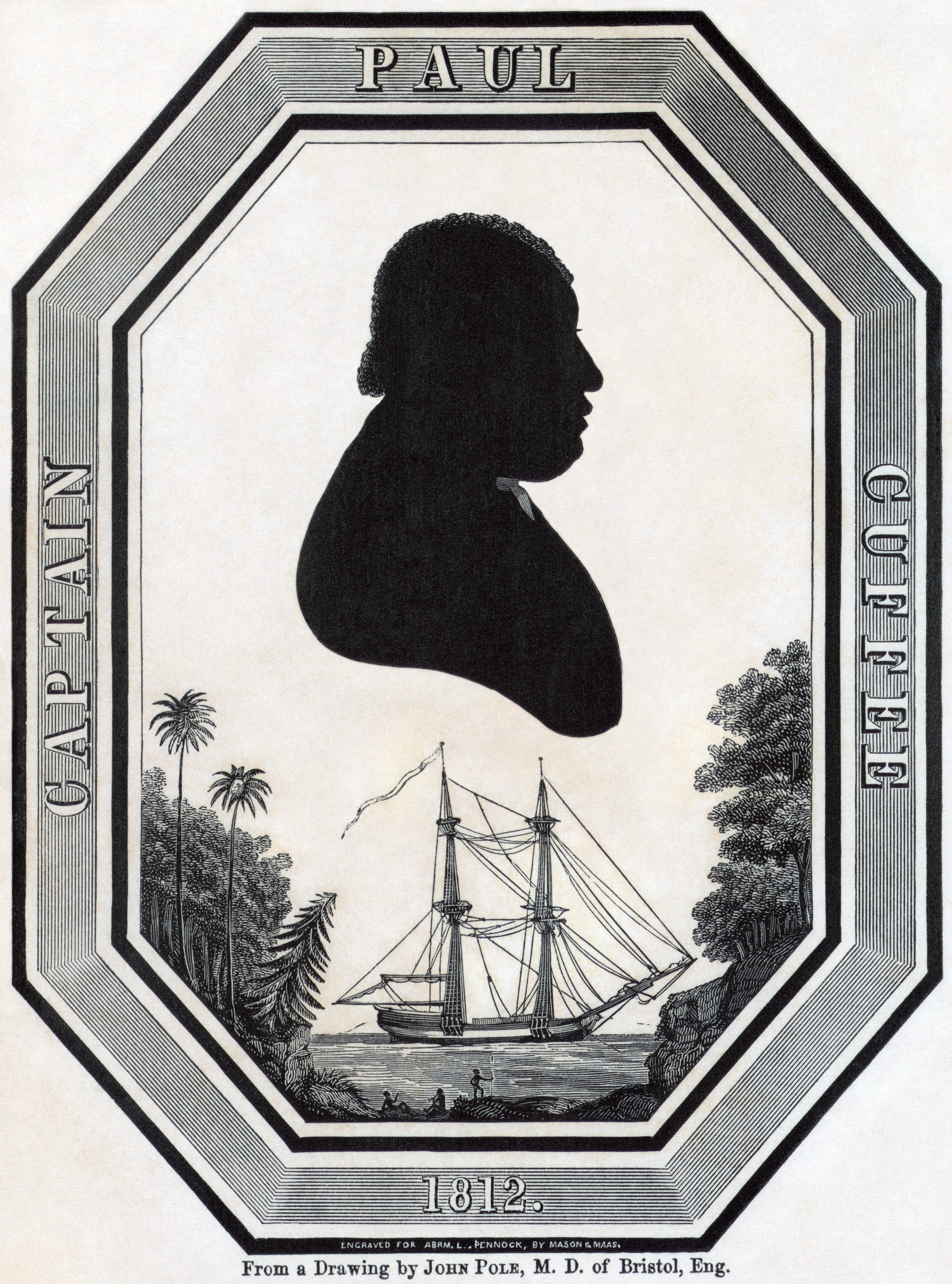
Paul Cuffee in 1812.

In 1787, Britain had started to resettle the "black poor" of London in the colony of Freetown in Sierra Leone. Many were Black Loyalists, former American slaves who had been freed in exchange for their services during the American Revolutionary War. The Crown also offered resettlement to former slaves whom they had first resettled in Nova Scotia. The Black Loyalists there found both the discrimination by white Nova Scotians and climate hard to bear. (See Black Nova Scotians.) Wealthy African-American shipowner Paul Cuffe thought that colonization was worth supporting. Aided by support from certain members of Congress and British officials, he transported 38 American blacks to Freetown in 1816 at his own expense. He died in 1817, but his private initiative helped arouse public interest in the idea of colonization.

=== Colonization societies ===
The American Colonization Society (ACS) was founded in 1816 by Virginia politician Charles F. Mercer and Presbyterian minister Robert Finley of New Jersey. The goal of the ACS was to settle free blacks outside of the United States; its method was to help them relocate to Africa.

Starting in January 1820, the ACS sent ships from New York to West Africa. The first had 88 free black emigrants and three white ACS agents on board. The agents were to find an appropriate area for a settlement. Additional ACS representatives arrived in the second ACS ship, the Nautilus. In December 1821, they acquired Cape Mesurado, a 36-mile-long (58 km) strip of land near present-day Monrovia, from the indigenous ruler King Peter (perhaps with some threat of force).

From the beginning, the colonists were attacked by indigenous peoples whose territory this was, such as the Malinké tribes. In addition, they suffered from disease, the harsh climate, lack of food and medicine, and poor housing conditions.

Until 1835, five more colonies were created by the colonization societies of five different states in the U.S., which were the Republic of Maryland, Kentucky-in-Africa, Mississippi in Africa, one by the Louisiana Colonization Society, and one set up by the Pennsylvania state colonization society. Another one was planned by the New Jersey colonization society but never came to fruition. The first colony on Cape Mesurado was extended along the coast as well as inland, sometimes by use of force against the native tribes. In 1838 the former four settlements came together to create the Commonwealth of Liberia. Monrovia was named the capital. By 1842, four out of the aforementioned five colonies were incorporated into Liberia, and the fifth settlement by the Pennsylvania society, Port Cresson, was destroyed by indigenous people. The colonists of African-American descent became known as Americo-Liberians. Many were of mixed race, including European ancestry. They remained African Americans in their education, religion, and culture, and they treated the natives as White Americans had treated them: as savages from the jungle, unwanted as citizens and not deserving the vote.

=== Rejection of colonization in the United States ===
Free people of color in the United States, with a few notable exceptions, overwhelmingly rejected the idea of moving to Liberia, or anywhere else in Africa, from the very beginning of the movement. Most of them had lived in the United States for generations, and while they wanted better treatment, they did not want to leave. (Note: As soon as they heard about it, 3,000 blacks packed a church in Philadelphia, "the bellwether city for free blacks", and "bitterly and unanimously" denounced it.) In response to the proposal for blacks to move to Africa, Frederick Douglass said "Shame upon the guilty wretches that dare propose, and all that countenance such a proposition. We live here—have lived here—have a right to live here, and mean to live here."

Starting in 1831 with William Lloyd Garrison's new newspaper, The Liberator, and followed by his Thoughts on African Colonization in 1832, support for colonization dropped, particularly in Northern free states. Garrison and his followers supported the idea of "immediatism," calling for immediate emancipation of all slaves and the legal prohibition of slavery throughout the United States. The ACS, Garrison declared, was "a creature without heart, without brains, eyeless, unnatural, hypocritical, relentless and unjust." It was not, in his view, a plan to eliminate slavery; rather, it was a way to protect it.

The ACS was made up of a combination of abolitionists who wanted to end slavery—it was easier to get slaves freed if they agreed to go to Liberia—and slaveholders who wanted to get rid of free people of color. Henry Clay, one of the founders of the group, had inherited slaves as a young child, but adopted antislavery views in the 1790s under the influence of his mentor, George Wythe. Garrison pointed out that the number of free people of color who actually resettled in Liberia was minute in comparison to the number of slaves in the United States. As put by one of his supporters: "As a remedy for slavery, it must be placed amongst the grossest of all delusions. In fifteen years it has transported less than three thousand persons to the African coast; while the increase on their numbers, in the same period, is about seven hundred thousand!"

=== High mortality ===
Emigrants to Liberia suffered the highest mortality rate of any country since modern record-keeping began. Of the 4,571 emigrants who arrived in Liberia from 1820 to 1842, only 1,819 survived until 1843. The ACS knew of the high death rate, but continued to send more people to the colony. Professor Shick writes:

[T]he organization continued to send people to Liberia while very much aware of the chances for survival. The organizers of the A.C.S. considered themselves to be humanitarians performing the work of God. This attitude prevented them from accepting certain realities of their crusade. Any problems, including those of disease and deaths, were viewed as the trials and tribulations that God provides as a means of testing the fortitude of man. After every report of disaster in Liberia the managers simply renewed their efforts. Once the organization was formed and the auxiliaries established, a new force developed which also prevented the Society from admitting the seriousness of the mortality problem. The desire to perpetuate the existence of the corporate body became a factor. To have admitted that the mortality rate made the price of emigration far too high to be continued would have meant the end of the organization. The managers were seemingly unprepared to advise the termination of their project and by extension, their own jobs.

=== Handing over command to Americo-Liberians ===
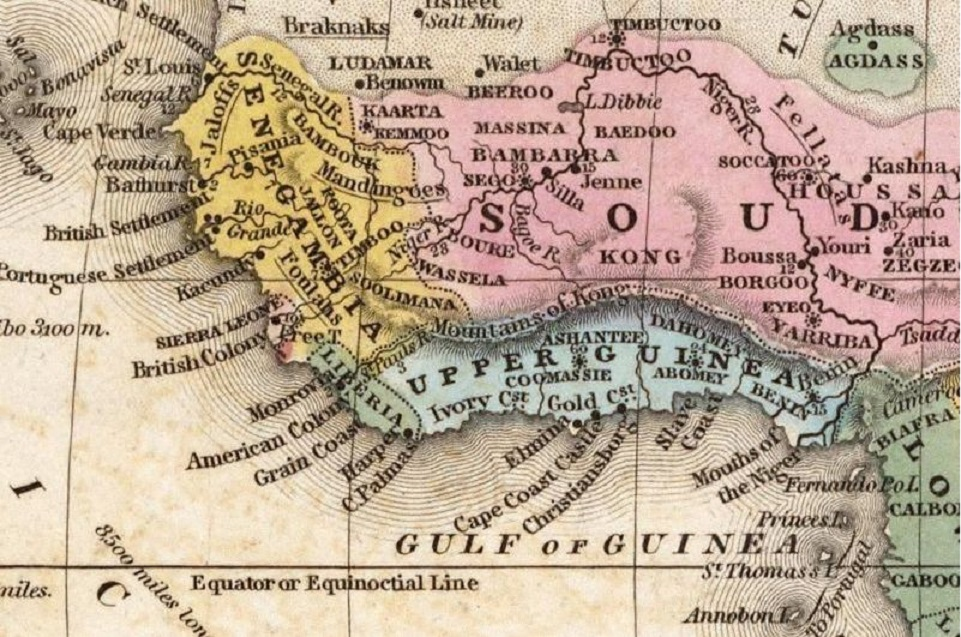
Liberia on a 1839 map of West Africa

The ACS administrators gradually gave the burgeoning colony more self-governance. In 1839, it was reorganized into the Commonwealth of Liberia. In 1841, the Commonwealth's first non-white governor, Joseph Jenkins Roberts, was appointed by ACS's governing board. In early 1847, the ACS directed Liberian leadership to declare independence. On July 26, 1847, eleven signatories to the Liberian Declaration of Independence established the free and independent Republic of Liberia. It took several years for other nations to recognize Liberia's independence, most notably Britain in 1848 and France in 1852. In the United States, the Southern bloc in Congress refused to recognize Liberian sovereignty. In 1862, however, following the departure of most Southern congressmen due to the American Civil War and the secession of the Southern states, the United States finally established diplomatic relations and welcomed a Liberian delegation to Washington.

== Americo-Liberian rule (1847–1980) ==
Between 1847 and 1980, the state of Liberia was dominated by the small minority of African-American colonists and their descendants, known collectively as Americo-Liberians. The Americo-Liberian minority, many of whom were mixed-race African Americans, viewed the native majority as "racially" inferior to themselves and treated them much the same as white Americans had treated them. To avoid "racial" contamination, the Americo-Liberians practiced endogamous marriage. For over a century the indigenous population of the country was denied the right to vote or participate significantly in the running of the country. The Americo-Liberians consolidated power amongst themselves. They, but not the natives, received financial support from supporters in the United States. They established plantations and businesses, and were generally richer than the indigenous people of Liberia, exercising overwhelming political power.

=== Politics ===
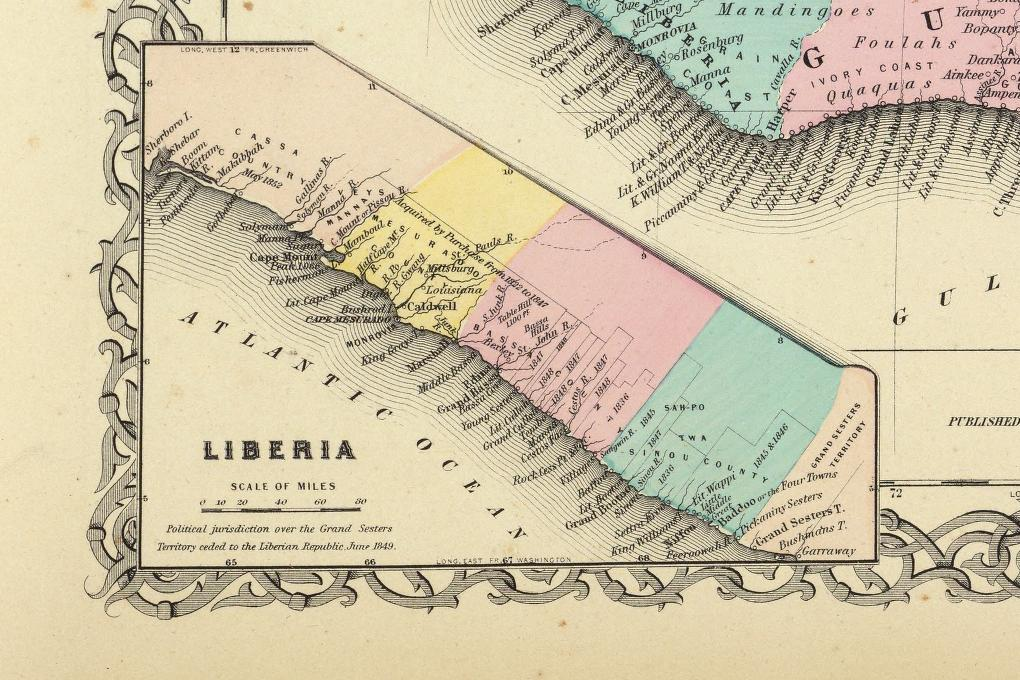
Map of Liberia c.1856

Politically, Liberia was dominated by two political parties. The Americo-Liberians had limited the franchise to prevent indigenous Liberians from voting in elections. The Liberian Party (later the Republican Party), was supported primarily by mixed-race African Americans from poorer backgrounds, while the True Whig Party received much of its following from richer blacks. From the first presidential election in 1847, the Liberian Party held political dominance. It used its position of power to attempt to cripple its opposition.

In 1869, however, the Whigs won the presidential election under Edward James Roye. Although Roye was deposed after two years and the Republicans returned to government, the Whigs regained power in 1878 and maintained power constantly thereafter for over a century.

A series of rebellions among the indigenous Liberian population took place between the 1850s and 1920s. In 1854, a newly independent African-American state in the region, the Republic of Maryland, was forced by an insurgency of the Grebo and the Kru people to join Liberia. Liberia's expansion brought the colony into border disputes with the French and British in French Guinea and Sierra Leone, respectively. The presence and protection of the U.S. Navy in West Africa until 1916 ensured that Liberia's territorial acquisitions or independence were never under threat.

=== Society ===
==== Americo-Liberian and indigenous segregation (1847–1940) ====
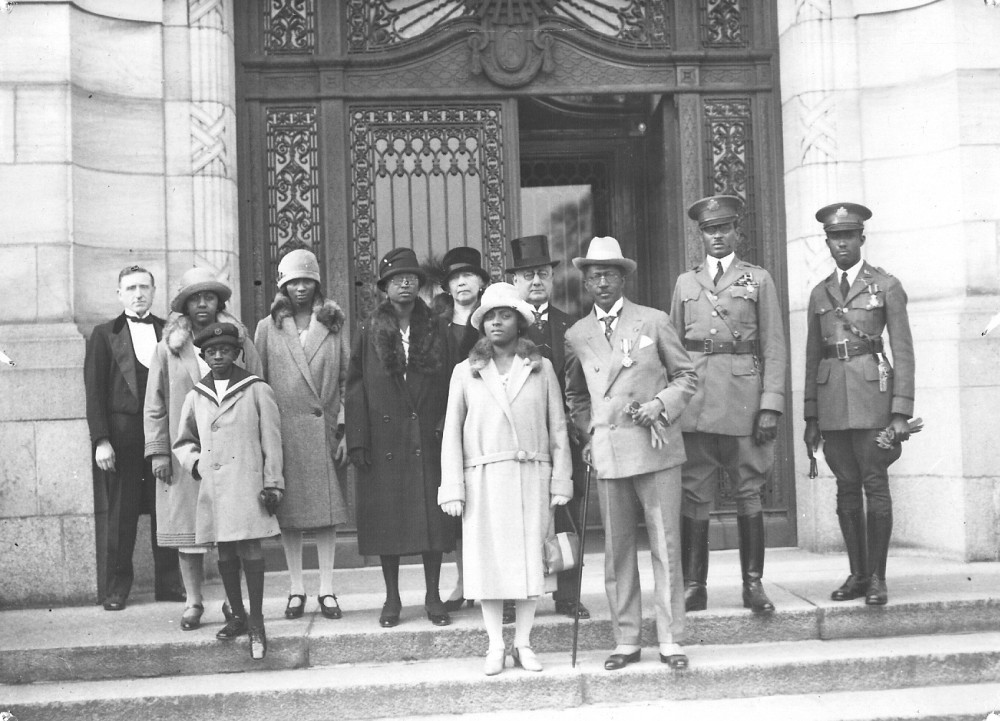
Charles D. B. King, 17th President of Liberia (1920–1930), with his entourage on the steps of the Peace Palace, The Hague (the Netherlands), 1927.

The social order in Liberia was dominated by Americo-Liberians. Although descended primarily from peoples of African origin, often with some white ancestry as slave owners commonly impregnated their female slaves (see Children of the plantation), the ancestors of most Americo-Liberians had been born in the United States for generations before emigrating to Africa. As a result, they held American cultural, religious, and social values. Like most Americans of the period, the Americo-Liberians held a firm belief in the religious superiority of Christianity, and indigenous animism and culture became systematically oppressed.

The Americo-Liberians created communities and a society that reflected closely the American society they had known. They spoke English, and built churches and houses in styles resembling those found in the Southern United States. The Americo-Liberians controlled the native peoples' access to the ocean, modern technology and skills, literacy, higher levels of education, and valuable relationships with many of the United States' institutions—including the American government.

Reflecting the system of segregation in the United States, the Americo-Liberians created a cultural and racial caste system, with themselves at the top and indigenous Liberians at the bottom. They believed in a form of "racial equality," which meant that all residents of Liberia had the potential to become "civilized" through western-style education and conversion to Christianity.

==== Social change (1940–1980) ====
During World War II, thousands of indigenous Liberians migrated from the nation's rural interior to the coastal regions in search of jobs. The Liberian Government had long opposed this kind of migration, but was no longer able to restrain it. In the decades after 1945, the Liberian government received hundreds of millions of dollars of unrestricted foreign investment, which destabilized the Liberian economy. Government revenue rose enormously, but was being grossly embezzled by government officials. Growing economic disparities caused increased hostility between indigenous groups and Americo-Liberians.

The social tensions led President William Tubman to enfranchise the indigenous Liberians in 1951. Tubman and his True Whig Party continued to repress political opposition and rig elections.

=== Economics ===
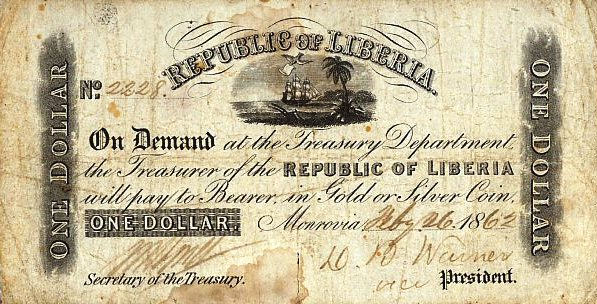
A one Liberian Dollar banknote from 1862

The suppression of the transatlantic slave trade in West Africa by the American and British navies after 1808 also produced new settlers, as these two navies would settle liberated slaves in Liberia or Sierra Leone. In the later 19th century, Liberia had to economically compete with European colonies in Africa. The economy of Liberia was always based on the production of agricultural products for export. In particular, Liberia's important coffee industry was destroyed in the 1870s by the emergence of production in Brazil.

New technology that became available in Europe increasingly drove Liberian shipping companies out of business. Although Roye's government attempted to procure funding for a railway in 1871, the plan never materialized. The first railway in Liberia was not constructed until 1945. From the late 19th century, European powers, such as the United Kingdom and Germany, invested in infrastructure in their African colonies, making them more competitive in terms of getting products to market, improving communications, etc.

The national currency, the Liberian dollar, collapsed in 1907. The country was later forced to adopt the United States dollar. The Liberian government was constantly dependent on foreign loans at high rates of exchange, which endangered the country's independence.

In 1926, Firestone, an American rubber company, started the world's largest rubber plantation in Liberia. This industry created 25,000 jobs, and rubber quickly became the backbone of the Liberian economy; in the 1950s, rubber accounted for 40% of the national budget. During the 1930s, Liberia signed concession agreements with Dutch, Danish, German, and Polish investors in what has been described as an "open door" economic policy.

Between 1946 and 1960, exports of natural resources such as iron, timber and rubber rose significantly. In 1971, Liberia had the world's largest rubber industry, and was the third largest exporter of iron ore. Since 1948, ship registration was another important source of state revenue.

From 1962 until 1980, the U.S. donated $280 million in aid to Liberia, in exchange for which Liberia offered its land rent-free for American government facilities. Throughout the 1970s, the price of rubber in the world commodities market was depressed, which put pressure on Liberian state finances.

=== International relations ===
After 1927, the League of Nations investigated accusations that the Liberian government had forcibly recruited and sold indigenous people as contract laborers or slaves. In its 1930 report, the league admonished the Liberian government for "systematically and for years fostering and encouraging a policy of gross intimidation and suppression" by "[suppressing] the native, prevent him from realizing his powers and limitations and prevent him from asserting himself in any way whatever, for the benefit of the dominant and colonizing race, although originally the same African stock as themselves." President Charles D. B. King hastily resigned.

==== Relations with the United States ====
The United States had a long history of intervening in Liberia's internal affairs, and had repeatedly sent naval vessels to help suppress insurrections by indigenous tribes before and after independence (in 1821, 1843, 1876, 1910, and 1915). However, the United States had lost interest in Liberia after 1876 (the end of Reconstruction), and the country instead became closely tied to British capital. Starting in 1909, the U.S. once again became heavily involved in Liberia. By 1909, Liberia faced serious external threats to its sovereignty over unpaid foreign loans and border disputes.

In 1912, the U.S. arranged a 40-year international loan of $1.7 million, against which Liberia had to agree to four Western powers (United States, Britain, France, and Germany) controlling Liberian Government revenues until 1926. The American administration of the border police stabilized the frontier with Sierra Leone (then part of the British Empire), and checked French ambitions to annex more Liberian territory. The United States Navy established a coaling station in Liberia.

Ensuring American support for Liberian independence, prosperity, and reform was among the high priorities of United States President, William Howard Taft. The United States played a significant role in training the Liberian army, known as the Liberian Frontier Force, with the assistance of African-American officers from the United States Army. The American presence warded off European powers, defeated a series of local rebellions, and helped bring in American technology to develop the resource-rich interior. Democracy was not a high priority, as the 15,000 Americo-Liberians had full control over the approximately 750,000 locals. The Krus and Greboe tribes remained highly reluctant to accept control from Monrovia, but were not powerful enough to overcome a regime strongly supported by the U.S. Army and Navy. The American officers, including Charles Young and Benjamin Davis among others, were skilled at training recruits, helped the government minimize corruption, and advocated for loans from American corporations (while monitoring the resulting flow of fund).

=== World War I ===
Liberia remained neutral for most of World War I. It joined the war on the Allied side on 4 August 1917. After its declaration of war, the resident German merchants were expelled from Liberia. As they constituted the country's largest investors and trading partners, Liberia suffered economically as a result.

=== Firestone concession ===
In 1926, the Liberian government granted a concession to Firestone, an American rubber company, that allowed the company to establish the world's largest rubber plantation at Harbel, Liberia. Concurrently, Firestone had arranged a $5 million private loan to Liberia. By the 1930s, Liberia became virtually bankrupt once again. After receiving pressure from the United States, the Liberian government agreed to an assistance plan from the League of Nations. As stipulated by the plan, two key officials of the league were placed in positions to "advise" the Liberian government.

=== World War II ===
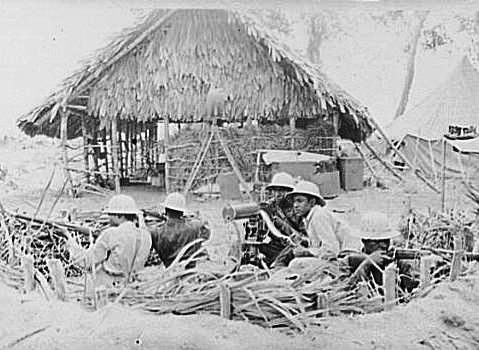
American troops in Liberia during World War II.

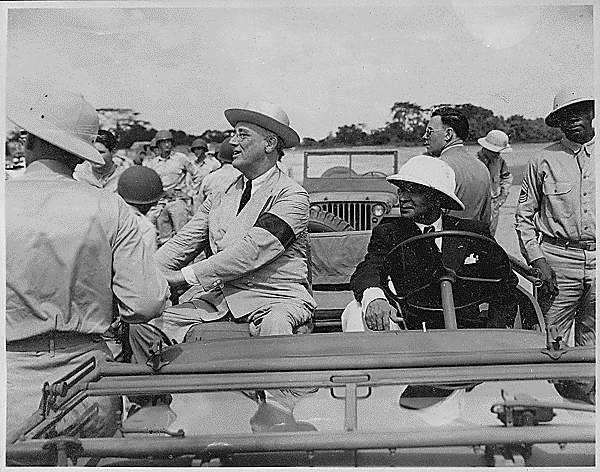
President Edwin Barclay and U.S. President Franklin D. Roosevelt (in car, left) during World War II, 1943

In 1942, Liberia signed a defense pact with the United States. Rubber was a strategically important commodity, and Liberia assured the U.S. and its allies that a sufficient supply of natural rubber would be provided. Furthermore, Liberia allowed the U.S. to use its territory as a bridgehead for transports of soldiers and war supplies, in addition to the construction of military bases, airports, the Freeport of Monrovia, roads to the interior, etc. Many of the American personnel who passed through Liberia were black soldiers (who, at the time, were in racially segregated army divisions), and were deployed into military service in Europe. The American military presence boosted the Liberian economy; thousands of laborers descended from the interior to the coastal region. The country's huge iron ore deposits were made accessible to commerce.

The Defense Areas Agreement between the U.S. and Liberia entailed the US-financed construction of Roberts Field airport, the Freeport of Monrovia, and roads into the interior of Liberia. By the end of World War II, approximately 5,000 American troops had been stationed in Liberia. Americo-Liberians disproportionately controlled and benefited from Liberia's growing economy and increase in foreign investment.

=== Cold War ===
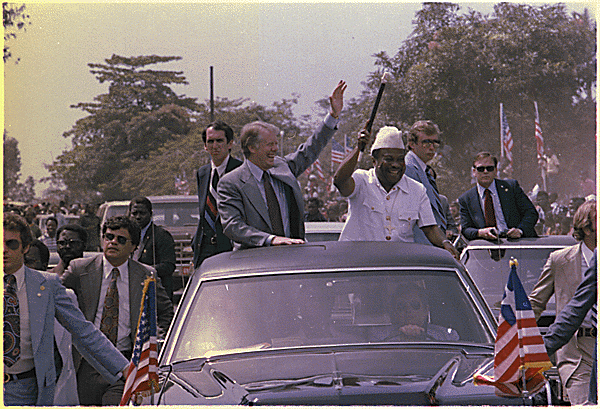
President Tolbert and U.S. President Jimmy Carter (in car, left) in Monrovia, 1978

After World War II, the U.S. pressured Liberia to resist the expansion of Soviet influence in Africa during the Cold War. Liberian president William Tubman was agreeable to this policy. Between 1946 and 1960 Liberia received some $500 million in unrestricted foreign investment, mainly from the U.S. From 1962 to 1980, the U.S. donated $280 million in aid to Liberia. In the 1970s under president Tolbert, Liberia strove for a more non-aligned and independent posture, and established diplomatic relations with the Soviet Union, China, Cuba and Eastern bloc countries. It also severed ties with Israel during the Yom Kippur War in 1973, but announced it supported American involvement in the Vietnam War.

President William Tolbert pursued a policy of suppressing opposition. Dissatisfaction over governmental plans to raise the price of rice in 1979 led to protest demonstrations in the streets of Monrovia. Tolbert ordered his troops to fire on the demonstrators, and seventy people were killed.

== Samuel Doe and the People's Redemption Council (1980–1989) ==
After a bloody overthrow of the Americo-Liberian régime by indigenous Liberians in 1980, a 'Redemption Council' took control of Liberia. Internal unrest, opposition to the new military regime, and governmental repression steadily grew, until in 1989 Liberia sank into outright tribal and civil war.

=== Coup d’état; relations with U.S. ===
Samuel Kanyon Doe (1951–1990) was a member of the Krahn, a small ethnic group. He was a master sergeant in the Liberian army, and had trained with the U.S. Army Special Forces. On April 12, 1980, Doe led a bloody coup d'état against president Tolbert, in which Tolbert and twenty-six of his supporters were murdered. Ten days later, thirteen of Tolbert's Cabinet members were executed publicly. This ended the 133 years of Americo-Liberian political domination. Doe formed a military regime known as the People's Redemption Council (PRC). Many welcomed Doe's takeover, since the majority of the population had always been excluded from power. The PRC also for the time being tolerated a relatively free press.

Doe quickly established good relations with the United States, especially after 1981, when U.S. President Ronald Reagan took office. Reagan more than tripled Liberia's financial aid, from $20 million in 1979 to $75 million per year. This soon rose to $95 million per annum. Liberia again became an important Cold War ally of the United States. Liberia protected important U.S. facilities and investments in Africa, and countered the threatened spread of Soviet influence in the continent. Doe closed the Libyan mission in Monrovia and severed diplomatic relations with the Soviet Union. He agreed to modify the mutual defense pact with the U.S., allowing the U.S. staging rights at 24 hours notice to use Liberia's harbors and airports for the U.S. Rapid Deployment Forces. Under Doe, Liberian ports were opened to American, Canadian, and European merchant ships, which brought in considerable foreign investment from shipping firms and earned Liberia a reputation as a tax haven.

=== Fear of counter-coup; repression ===
Doe put down seven coup attempts between 1981 and 1985. In August 1981, he had Thomas Weh Syen and four other PRC members arrested and executed for allegedly conspiring against him. Doe's government then declared amnesty for all political prisoners and exiles, and released sixty political prisoners. However, there soon were more internal rifts in the PRC. Doe became paranoid about the possibility of a counter-coup, and his government grew increasingly corrupt and repressive, banning all political parties, shutting down newspapers, and jailing reporters. He began to systematically eliminate PRC members who challenged his authority, and to place people of his own ethnic Krahn background in key positions, which intensified popular anger. Meanwhile, the economy deteriorated precipitously. Popular support for Doe's government evaporated.

=== 1985 presidential election ===
A draft constitution providing for a multiparty republic had been issued in 1983 and was approved by referendum in 1984. After the referendum, Doe staged a presidential election on October 15, 1985. Nine political parties sought to challenge Doe's National Democratic Party of Liberia (NDPL), but only three were allowed to take part. Prior to the election, more than fifty of Doe's opponents were murdered. Doe was ‘elected’ with 51% of the vote, but the election was heavily rigged. Foreign observers declared the elections fraudulent, and most of the elected opposition candidates refused to take their seats. U.S. Assistant Secretary of State for Africa Chester Crocker testified before Congress that the election was imperfect but that at least it was a step toward democracy. He further justified his support for the election results with the claim that, in any case, all African elections were known to be rigged at that time.

=== Descent into war ===
In November 1985, Doe's former second-in-command Thomas Quiwonkpa led an estimated 500 to 600 people in a failed attempt to seize power; all were killed. Doe was sworn in as president on January 6, 1986. Doe then initiated crackdowns against certain tribes, such as the Gio (or Dan) and Mano, in the north, where most of the coup plotters came from. This government's mistreatment of certain ethnic groups resulted in divisions and violence among indigenous peoples, who until then had coexisted relatively peacefully. In the late 1980s, as fiscal austerity took hold in the United States and the perceived threat of Communism declined with the waning of the Cold War, the U.S. became disenchanted with Doe's government and began cutting off critical foreign aid to Liberia. This, together with the popular opposition, made Doe's position precarious.

== First Liberian Civil War (1989–1996) ==
In the late 1980s opposition from abroad to Doe's regime led to economic collapse. Doe had already been repressing and crushing internal opposition for some time, when in November 1985 another coup attempt against him failed. Doe retaliated against tribes such as the Gio (or Dan) and Mano in the north, where most of the coup plotters had come from. Doe's Krahn tribe began attacking other tribes, particularly in Nimba County in the northeast of Liberia, bordering on Ivory Coast and on Guinea. Some Liberian northerners fled brutal treatment from the Liberian army into the Ivory Coast.

=== Charles Taylor and the NPFL (1980–1989) ===
Charles Taylor, born 1948 in Arthington, Liberia, is son of a Gola mother and either an Americo-Liberian or an Afro-Trinidadian father. Taylor was a student at Bentley University in Waltham, Massachusetts, U.S.A., from 1972 to 1977, earning a degree in economics. After the 1980 coup d’état he served some time in Doe's government until he was fired in 1983 on accusation of embezzling government funds. He fled Liberia, was arrested in 1984 in Massachusetts on a Liberian warrant for extradition, and jailed in Massachusetts. He escaped from jail the following year and probably fled to Libya. In 1989, while in the Ivory Coast, Taylor assembled a group of rebels into the National Patriotic Front of Liberia (NPFL), mostly from the Gio and Mano tribes.

=== War ===
December 1989, the NPFL invaded Nimba County in Liberia. Thousands of Gio and Mano, along with Liberians of other ethnic background, joined them. The Liberian army (AFL) counterattacked, and retaliated against the whole population of the region. Mid-1990, a war was raging between Krahn on one side, and Gio and Mano on the other. Thousands of civilians from both sides were massacred.

By the middle of 1990, Taylor controlled much of the country, and by June laid siege to Monrovia. In July, Yormie Johnson split off from NPFL and formed the Independent National Patriotic Front of Liberia (INPFL), based around the Gio tribe. Both NPFL and INPFL continued their siege of Monrovia.

In August 1990, the Economic Community of West African States (ECOWAS), an organisation of West African states, created a military intervention force called the Economic Community of West African States Monitoring Group (ECOMOG) composed of 4,000 troops, to restore order. President Doe and Yormie Johnson (INPFL) agreed to this intervention, while Taylor did not.

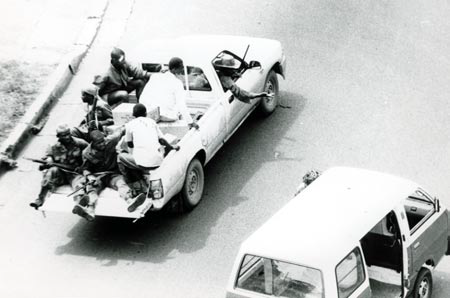
INPFL militiamen in 1990 after taking control of much of Monrovia.

On September 9, President Doe paid a visit to the barely established headquarters of ECOMOG in the Free Port of Monrovia. While he was at the ECOMOG headquarters, he was attacked by INPFL, taken to the INPFL's Caldwell base, tortured, and killed.

In November 1990, ECOWAS agreed with some principal Liberian players, but without Charles Taylor, on an Interim Government of National Unity (IGNU) under President Amos Sawyer. Sawyer established his authority over most of Monrovia, with the help of a paramilitary police force, the 'Black Berets', under Brownie Samukai, while the rest of the country was in the hands of the various warring factions.

In June 1991, former Liberian army fighters formed a rebel group, the United Liberation Movement of Liberia for Democracy (ULIMO). They entered western Liberia in September 1991 and gained territories from the NPFL.

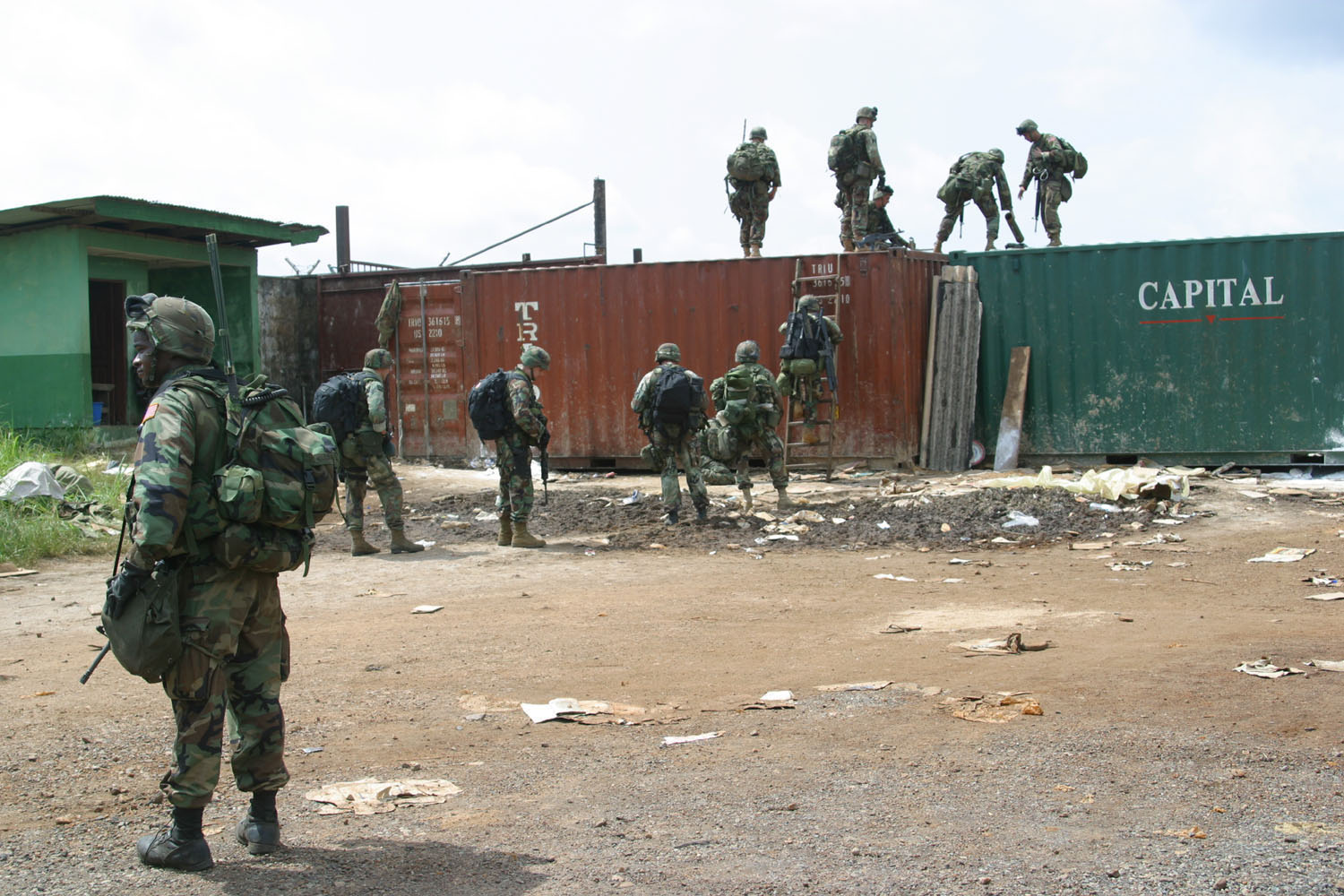
American troops secure Freeport of Monrovia, 2003

In 1993, ECOWAS brokered a peace agreement in Cotonou, Benin. On 22 September 1993, the United Nations established the United Nations Observer Mission in Liberia (UNOMIL) to support ECOMOG in implementing the Cotonou agreement. In March 1994, the Interim Government of Amos Sawyer was succeeded by a Council of State of six members headed by David D. Kpormakpor.

Renewed armed hostilities broke out in 1994 and persisted. During the course of the year, ULIMO split into two militias: ULIMO-J, a Krahn faction led by Roosevelt Johnson, and ULIMO-K, a Mandigo-based faction under Alhaji G.V. Kromah. Faction leaders agreed to the Akosombo peace agreement in Ghana but with little consequence. In October 1994, the UN reduced its number of UNOMIL observers to about 90 because of the lack of will among combatants to honor peace agreements. In December 1994, the factions and parties signed the Accra agreement, but fighting continued. In August 1995, the factions signed an agreement largely brokered by Jerry Rawlings, Ghanaian President; Charles Taylor agreed.

In September 1995, Kpormakpor’s Council of State was succeeded by one under the civilian Wilton G. S. Sankawulo and with the factional heads Taylor, Alhaji Kromah, and George Boley in it. In April 1996, followers of Taylor and Kromah assaulted the headquarters of Johnson in Monrovia, and the peace accord collapsed. In August 1996, a new ceasefire was reached in Abuja, Nigeria. On September 3, 1996, Ruth Perry followed Sankawulo as chairwoman of the Council of State, with the same three militia leaders in it.

== Second Liberian Civil War (1997–2003) ==
=== Elections 1997 ===
Charles Taylor won the 1997 presidential elections with 75.33 percent of the vote, while the runner-up, Unity Party leader Ellen Johnson Sirleaf, received a mere 9.58 percent of the vote. Accordingly, Taylor's National Patriotic Party gained 21 of a possible 26 seats in the Senate, and 49 of a possible 64 seats in the House of Representatives. The election was judged free and fair by some observers although it was charged that Taylor had employed widespread intimidation to achieve victory at the polls.

=== 1997–1999 ===
Bloodshed in Liberia did slow considerably, but it did not end. Violence kept flaring up. During his entire reign, Taylor had to fight insurgencies against his government. Suspicions were rife that Taylor continued to assist rebel forces in neighbouring countries like Sierra Leone, trading weapons for diamonds.

Taylor had fortified his power over Liberia mostly by purging the security forces of opponents, killing opposition figures, and raising new paramilitary units that were loyal only to him or his most trusted officers. Nevertheless, he still faced a few remaining opponents in the country, mostly former warlords of the First Liberian Civil War who had kept part of their forces to protect themselves from Taylor. His most important domestic rival by early 1998 was Roosevelt Johnson, a Krahn leader and former commander of the ULIMO. After some minor armed altercations, almost all of Johnson's followers were finally killed by Taylor's security forces during a major firefight in September 1998, though Johnson himself managed to flee into the United States embassy. After one last attempt by Taylor's paramilitaries to kill him there, causing a major diplomatic incident, Johnson was evacuated to Ghana.

=== 1999–2003 ===
Some ULIMO forces reformed themselves as the Liberians United for Reconciliation and Democracy (LURD), backed by the government of neighbouring Guinea. In 1999, they emerged in northern Liberia, and in April 2000 they started fighting in Lofa County in northernmost Liberia. By the spring of 2001, they were posing a major threat to the Taylor government. Liberia was now engaged in a complex three-way conflict with Sierra Leone and the Republic of Guinea.

Meanwhile, the United Nations Security Council in March 2001 (Resolution 1343) concluded that Liberia and Taylor played roles in the civil war in Sierra Leone, and therefore:

- banned all arms sales to, and diamonds sales from Liberia; and
- banned high Liberian Government members from travel to UN-states.

By the beginning of 2002, Sierra Leone and Guinea were supporting the LURD, while Taylor was supporting opposition factions in both countries. By supporting Sierra Leonean rebels, Taylor also drew the hostility of the British and American governments.

In 2003, other elements of the former ULIMO-factions formed another new small rebel group in the Republic of Ivory Coast, the Movement for Democracy in Liberia (MODEL), headed by Yayah Nimley, and they emerged in the south of Liberia.

=== Women of Liberia ===
Women of Liberia Mass Action for Peace.

In 2002, the women in Liberia were tired of seeing their country torn apart. Organized by social worker Leymah Gbowee, women started gathering and praying in a fish market to protest the violence. They organized the Women in Peacebuilding Network (WIPNET), and issued a statement of intent:

"In the past we were silent, but after being killed, raped, dehumanized, and infected with diseases, and watching our children and families destroyed, war has taught us that the future lies in saying NO to violence and YES to peace! We will not relent until peace prevails."

Joined by the Liberian Muslim Women's Organization, Christian women and their allies created Women of Liberia Mass Action for Peace. They wore white to symbolize peace, staged silent nonviolence protests and forced a meeting with Taylor and extracted a promise from him to attend peace talks in Ghana.

In 2003, a delegation of Liberian women went to Ghana to continue to apply pressure on the warring factions during the peace process. They staged a sit-in outside of the Presidential Palace, blocking all the doors and windows and preventing anyone from leaving the peace talks without a resolution. Women of Liberia Mass Action for Peace became a political force against violence and against their government. Their actions brought about an agreement during the stalled peace talks. As a result, the women were able to achieve peace in Liberia after a 14-year civil war and later helped bring to power the country's first female head of state, Johnson Sirleaf.

=== UN timber embargo and arrest warrant against Taylor ===
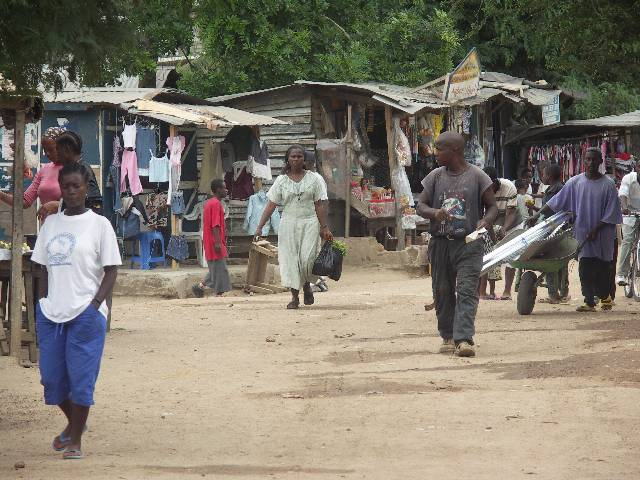
The Buduburam refugee camp west of Accra, Ghana, home in 2005 to more than 40,000 refugees from Liberia

On March 7, 2003, the war tribunal Special Court for Sierra Leone (SCSL) decided to summon Taylor and charge him with war crimes and crimes against humanity, but they kept this decision and this charge secret until June that year.

Due to concerns over the lack of social, humanitarian and development use of industry revenue by the Liberian government, the UN Security Council enacted a 10-month embargo on timber imports from Liberia on July 7, 2003 (passed in Resolution 1478).

By mid-2003, LURD controlled the northern third of the country and was threatening the capital, MODEL was active in the south, and Taylor's government controlled only a third of the country: Monrovia and central Liberia.

On June 4, 2003, ECOWAS organized peace talks in Accra, Ghana, among the Government of Liberia, civil society, and the rebel groups LURD and MODEL. On the opening ceremony, in Taylor's presence, the SCSL revealed their charge against Taylor, which they had kept secret since March, and also issued an international arrest warrant for Taylor. The SCSL indicted Taylor for “bearing the greatest responsibility” for atrocities in Sierra Leone since November 1996. The Ghanaian authorities did not attempt to arrest Taylor, declaring they could not round up a president they themselves had invited as a guest for peace talks. The same day, Taylor returned to Liberia.

=== Pressure of rebels, Presidents, and UN: Taylor resigns ===
June 2003, LURD began a siege of Monrovia. July 9, the Nigerian President offered Taylor safe exile in his country, if Taylor stayed out of Liberian politics. Also in July, American President Bush stated twice that Taylor “must leave Liberia”. Taylor insisted that he would resign only if American peacekeeping troops were deployed to Liberia.

August 1, 2003, the Security Council, (Resolution 1497) decided on a multinational force in Liberia, to be followed-on by a United Nations stabilization force. ECOWAS sent troops under the banner of 'ECOMIL' to Liberia. These troops started to arrive in Liberia probably as of August 15. The U.S. provided logistical support. President Taylor resigned, and flew into exile in Nigeria. Vice-president Moses Blah replaced Taylor as interim-President.

An ECOWAS-ECOMIL force of 1000 Nigerian troops was airlifted into Liberia on August 15, to halt the occupation of Monrovia by rebel forces. Meanwhile, U.S. stationed a Marine Expeditionary Unit with 2300 Marines offshore Liberia.

== Peace agreement and transitional government (2003–2005) ==
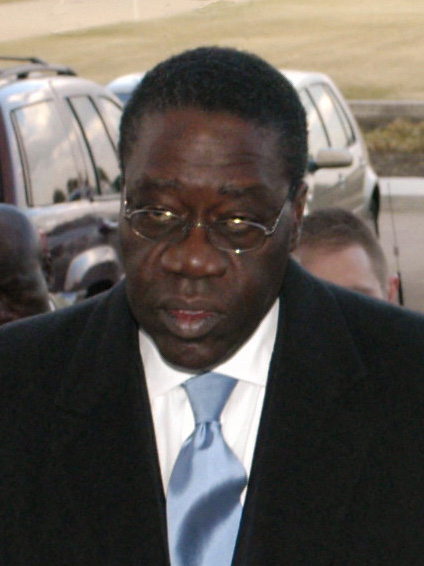
Gyude Bryant

On August 18, 2003, the Liberian Government, the rebels, political parties, and leaders from civil society signed the Accra Comprehensive Peace Agreement that laid the framework for a two-year National Transitional Government of Liberia. August 21, they selected businessman Charles Gyude Bryant as chair of the National Transitional Government of Liberia (NTGL), effective on October 14. These changes paved the way for the ECOWAS peacekeeping mission to expand into a 3,600-strong force, constituted by Benin, Gambia, Ghana, Guinea-Bissau, Mali, Nigeria, Senegal and Togo.

On October 1, 2003, UNMIL took over the peacekeeping duties from ECOWAS. Some 3,500 West African troops were provisionally ‘re-hatted’ as United Nations peacekeepers. The UN Secretary-General commended the African Governments who have contributed to UNMIL, as well as the United States for its support to the regional force. October 14, 2003, Blah handed power to Gyude Bryant.

Fighting initially continued in parts of the country, and tensions between the factions did not immediately vanish. But fighters were being disarmed; in June 2004, a program to reintegrate the fighters into society began; the economy recovered somewhat in 2004; by year's end, the funds for the re-integration program proved inadequate; also by the end of 2004, more than 100,000 Liberian fighters had been disarmed, and the disarmament program was ended.

In light of the progress made, President Bryant requested an end to the UN embargo on Liberian diamonds (since March 2001) and timber (since May 2003), but the Security Council postponed such a move until the peace was more secure. Because of a supposed ‘fundamentally broken system of governance that contributed to 23 years of conflict in Liberia’, and failures of the Transitional Government in curbing corruption, the Liberian government and the International Contact Group on Liberia signed onto the anti-corruption program GEMAP, starting September 2005.

== Ellen Johnson Sirleaf elected president (2005) ==
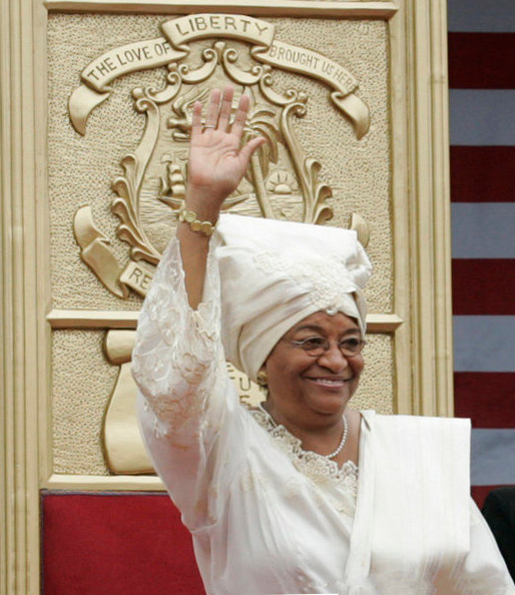
Ellen Johnson Sirleaf.

The transitional government prepared for fair and peaceful democratic elections on October 11, 2005, with UNMIL troops safeguarding the peace. Twenty three candidates stood for the presidential election, with George Weah, international footballer, UNICEF Goodwill Ambassador and member of the Kru ethnic group, and Ellen Johnson Sirleaf, a former World Bank economist and finance minister, Harvard-trained economist and of mixed Americo-Liberian and indigenous descent.

In the first round, no candidate took the required majority; Weah received 28% of the vote. A run-off between the top two vote getters, Weah and Ellen Johnson Sirleaf, was necessary.

The second round of elections took place on November 8, 2005. Johnson Sirleaf won this runoff decisively. Both the general election and runoff were marked by peace and order, with thousands of Liberians waiting patiently in the Liberian heat to cast their ballots.

Sirleaf claimed victory of this round, winning 59 percent of the vote. However, Weah alleged electoral fraud, despite international observers declaring the election to be free and fair. Although Weah was still threatening to take his claims to the Supreme Court if no evidence of fraud was found, Johnson Sirleaf was declared winner on November 23, 2005, and took office on January 16, 2006; becoming the first African woman to do so.

== Recent events (2006–present) ==
=== Allegations of labor rights abuses by Firestone ===
In November 2005, the International Labor Rights Fund filed an Alien Tort Claims Act (ATCA) case against Bridgestone, the parent company of Firestone, alleging “forced labor", the modern equivalent of slavery, on the Firestone Plantation in Harbel. In May 2006, the United Nations Mission in Liberia (UNMIL) released a report: “Human Rights in Liberia’s Rubber Plantations: Tapping into the Future”, which detailed the results of its investigation into the conditions on the Firestone plantation in Liberia.

=== Extradition and trial of Charles Taylor, arrest of Bryant ===
Under international pressure, President Sirleaf requested in March 2006 that Nigeria extradite Taylor, who was then brought before an international tribunal in Sierra Leone to face charges of crimes against humanity, arising from events during the Sierra Leone civil war (his trial was later transferred to The Hague for security purposes). In June 2006, the United Nations ended its embargo on Liberian timber (effective since May 2003), but continued its diamond embargo (effective since March 2001) until an effective certificate of origin program was established, a decision that was reaffirmed in October 2006.

In March 2007, former Interim President Bryant was arrested and charged with having embezzled government funds while in office. In August 2007, the Supreme Court of Liberia allowed the criminal prosecution for this to proceed in the lower courts. The court ruled that Bryant was not entitled to immunity as the head of state under the Constitution as he was not elected to the position and he was not acting in accordance with law when he allegedly stole US$1.3 million in property from the government.

=== Ebola epidemic ===
In 2014 an Ebola virus disease epidemic struck West Africa and spread to Liberia in early 2014. A few initial cases grew into an Ebola virus epidemic in Liberia.

The World Health Organization (WHO) declared Liberia free of Ebola virus transmission on May 9, 2015, after 42 days passed since the last confirmed case was buried.

=== Free and democratic elections 2011, 2017, and 2023 ===
In November 2011, President Ellen Johnson-Sirleaf was re-elected for a second six-year term.

Following the 2017 Liberian general election, former professional football striker George Weah, considered one of the greatest African players of all time, was sworn in as president on January 22, 2018, becoming the fourth-youngest president in Africa. The inauguration marked Liberia's first fully democratic transition in 74 years. Weah cited fighting corruption, reforming the economy, combating illiteracy, and improving life conditions as the main targets of his presidency.

Opposition leader Joseph Boakai defeated George Weah in the tightly contested 2023 presidential election. On 22 January 2024, Boakai was sworn in as Liberia's new president.

== See also ==
- History of Africa
- History of West Africa
- President of Liberia
- Politics of Liberia
- Lott Carey, of Richmond, Virginia, the first American missionary to Liberia
- Pray the Devil Back to Hell
- Monrovia history and timeline
- History of Sierra Leone
