= Nudity in combat =

Fictional and actual practice of wearing little or no clothing in battle

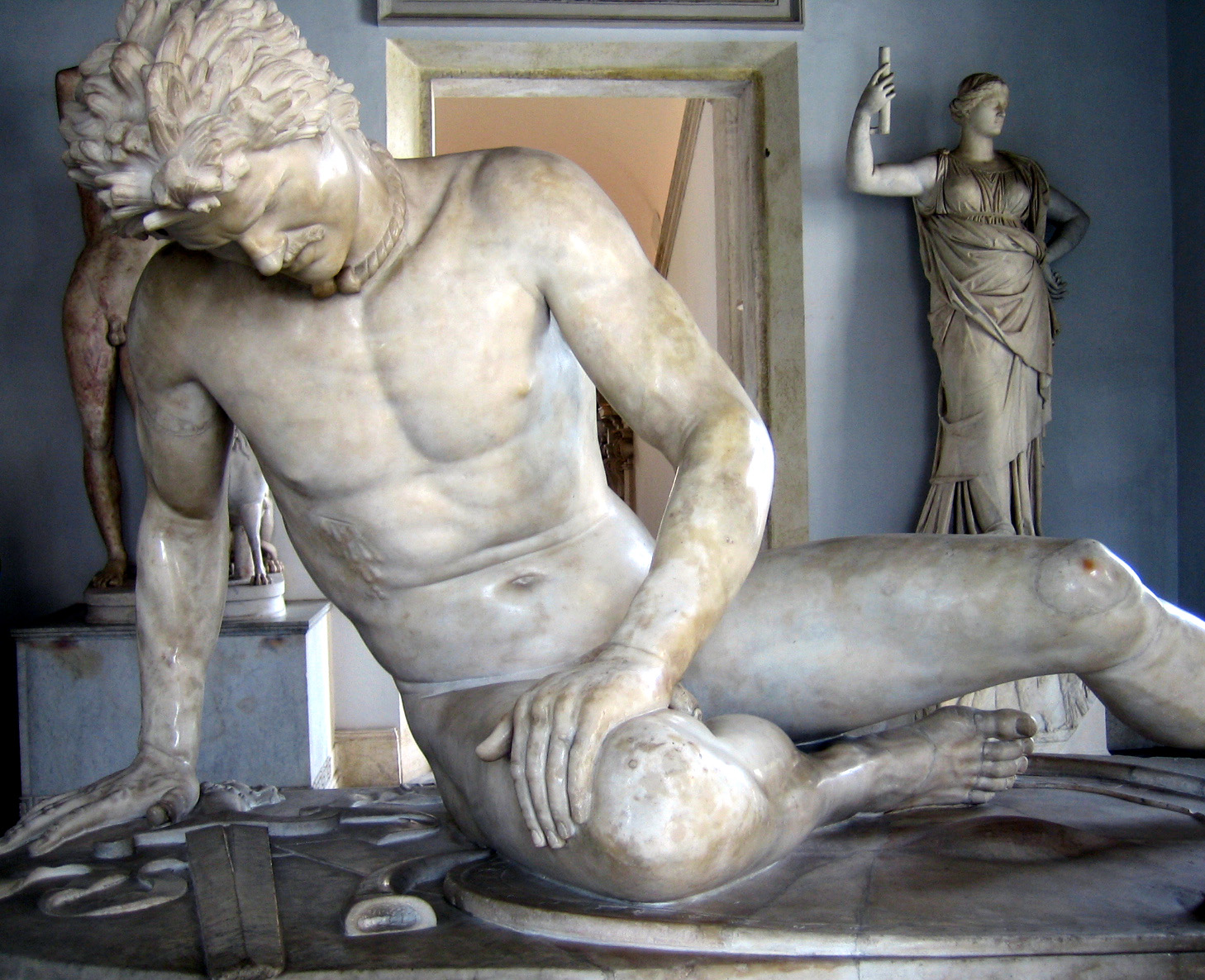
Dying Gaul, anonymous Roman sculpture

The practice of entering combat without the use of clothing and armor has been documented on several occasions in history. The artistic convention of heroic nudity was established in the art of ancient Greece by the Archaic period.

== Historical instances of nudity in combat ==
Polybius' Histories describe how the Gaesatae, hired by other Celtic peoples, the Boii and Insubres, as mercenaries to fight the Romans, stood naked at the head of their army at the Battle of Telamon in 225BC. The Boii and Insubres at this very battle are described fighting barechested, retaining only their trousers, shoes and cloaks.

Diodorus Siculus reported other instances of such combat: "Some use iron breast-plates in battle, while others fight naked, trusting only in the protection which nature gives."

Livy tells of how the Tolistobogii of Galatia fought naked, being proud of their spilt blood and even widening gashes they received themselves.

At the Battle of Cannae, Hannibal employed masses of Insubres and Boii warriors. Polybius describes them as fighting naked, armed only with their oval shields and long swords, although Livy has them only nude from waist up.

Strabo described Balearic slingers as fighting naked, protecting themselves only with a goatskin shield.

== Modern instances of nudity in combat ==
In some martial arts that are designed to be used for military fighting, full or partial nudity still occurs. The traditional donga style of stick fighting practiced by the young warriors, now bearing firearms, of the Omo Valley Suri tribe of South Sudan and western Ethiopia, is often practiced entirely naked. Serious injury is not uncommon, and wounds incurred during stick fighting are occasionally fatal. In the Vietnam War, Viet Cong sappers used to slip through barbed wire naked or almost naked. During the First Liberian Civil War, warlord General Butt Naked and his fighters fought naked under the belief it would make them immune to bullets.

== See also ==
- Nudity in sport
