= General Butt Naked =

Liberian preacher and warlord (born 1971)

Joshua Milton Blahyi
- Born: 30 September 1971 (age 55); Monrovia, Liberia
- Occupation: Preacher
- Military career
- Allegiance: United Liberation Movement of Liberia for Democracy
- Service years: c. 1993–1996
- Nickname: General Butt Naked
- Unit: Naked Base Commandos
- Conflicts: First Liberian Civil War

Joshua Milton Blahyi (born 30 September 1971), better known by his nom de guerre General Butt Naked, is a Liberian preacher and philanthropist best known for being a warlord during the First Liberian Civil War. Born in Monrovia into a Krahn family, Blahyi claims that at the age of seven he was inducted as a high priest into a secret society and participated in child sacrifices along with assisting the regime of President Samuel Doe. Such claims have been disputed by Blahyi's relatives, who instead claim he dropped out of school after the third grade and worked at a local market in Monrovia before turning to crime. In 1989, the National Patriotic Front of Liberia (NPFL) sparked the civil war when they invaded Liberia to topple Doe, who was murdered in 1990.

In c. 1993, Blahyi joined the United Liberation Movement of Liberia for Democracy (ULIMO), which had been formed in 1991 and fought against the NPFL. He raised his own militia of mostly child fighters known as the "Naked Base Commandos", and became known for going into combat wearing no clothing, which led to him adopting his nom de guerre. In c. 1994, ULIMO split into the rival ULIMO-K and ULIMO-J, and Blahyi backed the latter faction, resisting an attempt by the NPFL and ULIMO-K to arrest its leader Roosevelt Johnson in April 1996. Blahyi claimed to have experienced a vision of Jesus in July 1996 and abandoned his fighters, instead turning to street preaching. The war ended in 1997, and the NPFL's leader, Charles Taylor, was elected as president.

Blahyi, who was subject to political persecution by Taylor's administration, fled to a refugee camp in Ghana in 1999. There, Blahyi learned to read and write and began delivering sermons, founding a ministry and rehabilitation programme. In January 2008, he returned to Liberia and testified before the country's Truth and Reconciliation Commission, becoming the first former Liberian warlord to do so. Although his testimony was met with a mixed reaction among the Liberian public, it resulted in Blahyi achieving global fame, being featured in several documentaries and inspiring a character in the 2011 musical comedy The Book of Mormon. Many of Blahyi's claims about his life and philanthropic efforts have come under scrutiny, in particular the number of deaths his unit was responsible for during the war and the post-war rehabilitation programmes run by him.

== Early life ==
Monrovia in 1975

Joshua Milton Blahyi was born on 30 September 1971 in Liberia's capital of Monrovia into a Krahn family. In his 2013 autobiography, Blahyi wrote that he was handed over by his father at the age of seven to a group of Krahn elders, who anointed him as a high priest in their secret society. He alleged that as a priest he would receive visions informing him of children who were to be sacrificed; once he gave the victim's surname to the elders, they would abduct the child and sacrifice them on an altar. However, his half-brother Harrison Challar has disputed this account, asserting Blahyi never served as a priest but instead sold Kool-Aid and chicken soup at a market once he left school after the third grade, before becoming involved in drug trafficking and robberies.

On 12 April 1980, Samuel K. Doe, a master sergeant in the Armed Forces of Liberia (AFL), staged a coup d'état which overthrew and murdered President William R. Tolbert. In the aftermath of Tolbert's murder, Doe quickly became the de facto ruler of Liberia, heading a military junta known as the People's Redemption Council. Blahyi claimed in his autobiography that he served as a spiritual advisor to Doe and performed black magic rituals for him at the Executive Mansion, the official presidential residence in Monrovia, to influence the 1985 Liberian general election in Doe's favour. In a 2008 interview with BBC News, Blahyi stated that his alleged affinity and support for Doe was borne out a sense of tribal loyalty, as both men were born into Krahn families.

== Wartime actions ==
The First Liberian Civil War began on 24 December 1989 when Charles Taylor, a former government official and commander of the National Patriotic Front of Liberia (NPFL) rebel group, invaded Nimba County from the Ivory Coast to depose Doe. After intense fighting and atrocities committed by all sides, the Independent National Patriotic Front of Liberia, a breakaway rebel group led by Prince Yormie Johnson, captured and murdered Doe on 9 September 1990. In May 1991, a group of Liberian politicians and AFL veterans who had fled to Sierra Leone, mostly Krahn or Mandinka, founded the United Liberation Movement of Liberia for Democracy (ULIMO) rebel group to retake control of Liberia from the NPFL. By c. 1993, Blahyi had joined the ULIMO, which at the time was engaged in an offensive to capture Monrovia from NPFL forces. In January 1993, ULIMO fighters in Sierra Leone took advantage of fighting between the NPFL and ECOMOG peacekeepers to begin attacking the former.

As a ULIMO warlord, Blahyi formed his own militia of several dozen fighters known as the "Naked Base Commandos" or "Butt Naked Brigade", most of whom were children as young as nine. Operating around the Monrovia area with his unit, Blahyi became known for wearing only shoes and magic charms, and eventually adopted the nom de guerre "General Butt Naked". His fighters also followed his patterns of dress, which Blahyi, in line with his "distorted emulation of animist tradition", believed could make one immune to bullets. To fund his wartime activities and secure a steady supply of drugs for his fighters, Blahyi allegedly traded locally mined diamonds and gold to Mexican drug cartels in exchange for guns and cocaine. He conscripted many of his fighters, and according to some accounts laced the food he fed them with cocaine along with showing them Jean-Claude Van Damme films and "[explaining] to them that killing people was a game" in an effort to "uproot the fear of death".

During the conflict, Blahyi and his fighters perpetrated numerous atrocities, although the exact extent of the crimes they committed have been the subject of dispute. He has frequently discussed the alleged atrocities he perpetrated, which according to Blahyi included murders, cannibalism and human sacrifice. Blahyi has repeatedly estimated that the Naked Base Commandos were ultimately responsible for 20,000 deaths, a claim which has come under criticism; Mohammed Toure, a fellow Liberian warlord who personally witnessed him in combat, acknowledged that Blahyi was a "notorious killer" but argued that he "couldn't even reach one thousand [deaths]—it's not possible." Nicholai Lidow, an independent scholar who wrote his doctoral dissertation at Stanford University on Liberian rebel groups, stated in an interview with The New Yorker that as Blahyi commanded at most 40 fighters for roughly three years, it was unlikely that he was responsible for 10% of the war's death toll.

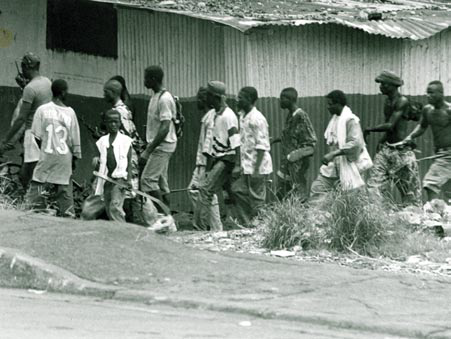
The NPFL searching for ULIMO fighters in Monrovia, 1996

In late 1993 or 1994, ULIMO, partly due to ethnic tensions, split into two rival factions: ULIMO-J, which was led by Roosevelt Johnson, and ULIMO-K, which was under the command of G. V. Kromah. Blahyi supported ULIMO-J, which funded him and his fighters. On 6 April 1996, the NPFL and ULIMO-K, which had both allied with each other, launched an operation to arrest Johnson in his Monrovia residence, "leading to one of the most ferocious battles of the war". Blahyi and other ULIMO-J warlords resisted the operation, and one bystander witnessed him standing atop a truck during the battle, holding an assault rifle with one hand and the severed genitals of a man in his other hand. A ceasefire ended the fighting after hundreds of people were killed.

Blahyi claimed to have received a vision of Jesus in July 1996, which he credited with ending his involvement in armed conflict. In his autobiography, he wrote that the incident occurred after he had murdered a three-year-old girl and cut out her heart: "When I looked back, I saw a man standing there... who told [me] 'Repent and live, or refuse and die.'" He left his unit, leaving his fighters to fend for themselves, and started sleeping in one of the pews of a local church. The church's pastor summoned his congregation, and together they prayed to God, requesting him to cure Blahyi of his "demonic powers". Blahyi subsequently went to see his superiors in ULIMO-J, handing over his weapons and charms and stating that "My new Commander is Jesus Christ."

== Religious activities and fame ==
After abandoning his unit, Blahyi began working as a bodyguard for a local bank official before becoming an evangelical street preacher, selling cassettes of his sermons on Monrovia's streets with the message of "If God can save me, He can save you, too". In 1997, the war ended, and Taylor won that year's presidential election, with one of his campaign slogans being "He killed my Ma, he killed my Pa, but I will vote for him." Once in office, Taylor used the Liberian military to persecute his former wartime enemies, including Blahyi, who fled to Ghana in 1999 and settled in a refugee camp. In the camp, he learnt to read and write English, studying the Bible and delivering sermons. In 1999, he founded the "End Time Train Evangelistic Ministries". In August 2003, Taylor stepped down as president; his administration had been collapsing due to the Second Liberian Civil War that various anti-government rebel groups had waged since 1999, and Taylor's decision ended the conflict.

In 2007, Blahyi founded "Journeys Against Violence" (JAV), a non-governmental programme intended to rehabilitate veterans of the Naked Base Commandos and other Liberian militia units. As noted by The New Yorker, JAV was marked by nepotism; Blahyi's half-brother was employed as the programme's supervisor, his mother was employed as its cook and one of JAV's official drivers was Blahyi's cousin. At some point, JAV began renting a house in the Monrovia suburb of Chocolate City as a residence for those who had joined its programme, and a series of "Ten Commandments" were drawn up for them; these included abstaining from drugs, alcohol, sex and fighting along with participating in daily prayers. As of 2016, the official JAV residence consisted of three small bedrooms "crammed with bunk beds". Activities for the programme's enrollees have included driving lessons, farming and bricklaying. The number of enrollees was stated to be 18 in 2016, rising to 48 in 2017.

In January 2008, Blahyi returned to Monrovia and became the first former Liberian warlord to testify before the Truth and Reconciliation Commission (TRC), which had been established by the Liberian government in May 2005 to investigate atrocities committed during both Liberian civil wars. Most of the former warlords who had been called on to testify by the commission, including Taylor and Prince Johnson, had refused to do so as the TRC lacked the authority to force any of them to testify. During Blahyi's testimony, which was broadcast live across Liberia on both television and radio, he recounted his alleged wartime actions and atrocities to the "enthralled" commission, which challenged few of his claims. A 2009 report published by the TRC recommended 38 people for prosecutorial amnesty, including Blahyi. As of 2016, most of the report's recommendations have not been implemented, and The New Yorker noted that such a decision is unpopular among the Liberian public.

The testimony, which quickly became front-page news in Liberia, resulted in Blahyi achieving global fame. The Liberian public's reaction to his testimony was mixed: while many condemned his actions and perceived his turn to street preaching and founding of JAV as a cynical attempt to avoid government prosecution, others forgave him either due to their Christian beliefs or because they thought that forgiveness was "the only way forward for the country". As the only warlord to speak openly about his wartime actions, Blahyi's public contrition "satisfied a deep need" and launched his career as a showman. In the aftermath of his testimony, he was interviewed by journalists around the world and featured in a 2010 Vice News travel documentary titled "The Vice Guide to Liberia", which has been viewed millions of times on YouTube. Several American evangelicals who viewed the documentary later contacted Blahyi and supplied funds to JAV, along with helping to publish his autobiography.

== Later life ==
In 2016, Blahyi claimed in an interview with Reuters that JAV had helped train roughly 1,000 veterans of the Liberian civil wars and street children in activities such as farming and bricklaying since it was founded, but had been hamstrung by a lack of funds. His request for a donation of 500,000 dollars was met with criticism by segments of the Liberian public, though the head official of Liberia's National Human Rights Commission informed Reuters that as JAV was "intended to help young people", the government "should encourage him to continue". In the same year, the journalist Damon Tabor investigated JAV for The New Yorker, and was told by an enrollee that Blahyi was embezzling the programme's funds, mistreated JAV's enrollees and used them as props for Western reporters. Blahyi denied the allegations, though he did admit to reneging on some of the promises made to enrollees, but justified it by stating: "The [enrollees] are very young... I know what is good for them."

Blahyi has repeatedly advocated for the establishment of a war crimes trial to try former combatants such as himself. In May 2024, President Joseph Boakai passed an executive order to establish a war crimes court for such a purpose, though as of April 2025 no such court has been actually established. In February 2025, Blahyi, who had been undergoing treatment at the John F. Kennedy Medical Center due to complications with his kidneys, was transferred to Kenya for advanced care. Liberian newspaper The New Dawn noted that Blahyi's medical complications mirrored similar issues faced by other former Liberian warlords, including Prince Johnson, who died on 28 November 2024 at a hospital in Paynesville. These developments have sparked concerns among the Liberian public, some of whom have claimed that Blahyi's reported health issues and move to Kenya are intended to help him evade justice if the Boakai administration actually establishes a war crimes court.

== In popular culture ==
Blahyi has been featured in several documentaries. In addition to the 2010 Vice documentary, Blahyi was also featured in a 2011 documentary titled "The Redemption of General Butt Naked", created by the filmmakers Eric Strauss and Daniele Anastasion and screened at the 2011 Sundance Film Festival. The documentary received mostly positive reviews; a review for The Hollywood Reporter praised the documentary for foregoing "any personal judgments to let audiences draw their own conclusions". Another review for Screen International was also positive, praising the documentary's depiction of the impact of Liberia's civil wars as "staggeringly cinematic" and calling it "one of the best titles since John Waters's Pecker" with "bravura visual flourishes". However, a mixed review for Indiewire argued that in spite the documentary's "skillful navigation of Blahyi's controversial freedom", it "lacks enough voices of dissent... it takes little scrutiny to realize his fate is not that simple."

The Book of Mormon, a 2011 satirical musical comedy written by Trey Parker, Robert Lopez and Matt Stone, features a character named "General Butt Fucking Naked". The character is depicted in the musical as a Ugandan warlord, as he was originally modelled after Joseph Kony, the infamous commander of the Lord's Resistance Army, a Ugandan militant group which rose to fame as a result of the Invisible Children, Inc. short documentary Kony 2012. Butt Fucking Naked, who serves as the plot's main antagonist, is shown ordering female genital mutilation and summarily executing protestors; he is also the subject of a conversion attempt by a Mormon missionary. Stone noted in an interview with ComingSoon.net that "warlords in Liberia have such colorful names and we were reading about the one named General Butt Naked. We just ripped off his joke, basically." Parker added in the same interview: "We were like, "What's better than Butt Naked? Butt F–ing Naked!"

== See also ==
- List of incidents of cannibalism
