= 1998 Monrovia clashes =

Clashes after the First Liberian Civil War

Monrovia clashes
- Part of the aftermath of the First Liberian Civil War
- The bodies of Krahn civilians that were massacred by government forces during or after the clashes in Monrovia.
Date	February–September 1998
Location	Monrovia, Liberia
Result	Partial victory of Charles Taylor: Monrovia purged of Roosevelt Johnson's followers; Mass killings of Krahn, which contribute to the Second Liberian Civil War's outbreak

Belligerents
(Liberia) Liberian government (Taylor loyalists)	(Liberia) Johnson's forces (ex-ULIMO-J); Limited involvement: Nigeria; United States

Commanders and leaders
(Liberia) Charles Taylor (Liberia) Benjamin Yeaten (Liberia) Chucky Taylor	(Liberia) Roosevelt Johnson

Units involved
Special Security Service (SSS); Executive Mansion Special Security Unit (EMSSU); Liberian National Police; Special Operation Division (SOD)	(Liberia) Krahn fighters (Nigeria) Nigerian ECOMOG peacekeepers (United States) U.S. embassy guards

Strength
Hundreds	Johnson's forces: Hundreds

Casualties and losses
Unknown, several killed	(Liberia) c. 300 killed (United States) 2 WIA
- Dozens of civilians killed during the clashes, hundreds massacred afterwards

The Monrovia clashes in 1998 were the result of Liberian President Charles Taylor's attempts to violently eliminate one of his last domestic political opponents, Roosevelt Johnson, a former warlord. At the time, Johnson still lived with a small loyal militia in Monrovia, the capital of Liberia. After some minor armed altercations, almost all of Johnson's followers were finally killed by Taylor's security forces during a major firefight in September 1998, though Johnson himself managed to flee into the United States embassy. After one last attempt by Taylor's paramilitaries to kill him there, causing a major diplomatic incident, Johnson was evacuated to Ghana. Although the clashes were effectively a political victory for Taylor as he had removed Johnson from Liberia, the mass killings of ethnic Krahn after the clashes contributed to the outbreak of the Second Liberian Civil War which saw the president being toppled.

== Background ==
After being elected in 1997, President Charles Taylor had fortified his power over Liberia, mostly by purging the security forces of opponents, killing opposition figures, and raising new paramilitary units that were loyal only to him or his most trusted officers. Nevertheless, he still faced a few remaining opponents in the country, mostly former warlords of the First Liberian Civil War who had kept part of their forces to protect themselves from Taylor. His most important domestic rival by early 1998 was Roosevelt Johnson, a Krahn leader and former commander of the ULIMO. Although Taylor had appointed him rural development minister, Johnson remained a threat because he still had hundreds of armed followers who remained in Monrovia. Protected by Nigerian ECOMOG peacekeepers, Johnson, his men and their families (mostly ethnic Krahn) lived in a fortified one-block-long apartment compound in the capital's downtown which was nicknamed "Camp Johnson Road".

== History ==
=== Clashes ===
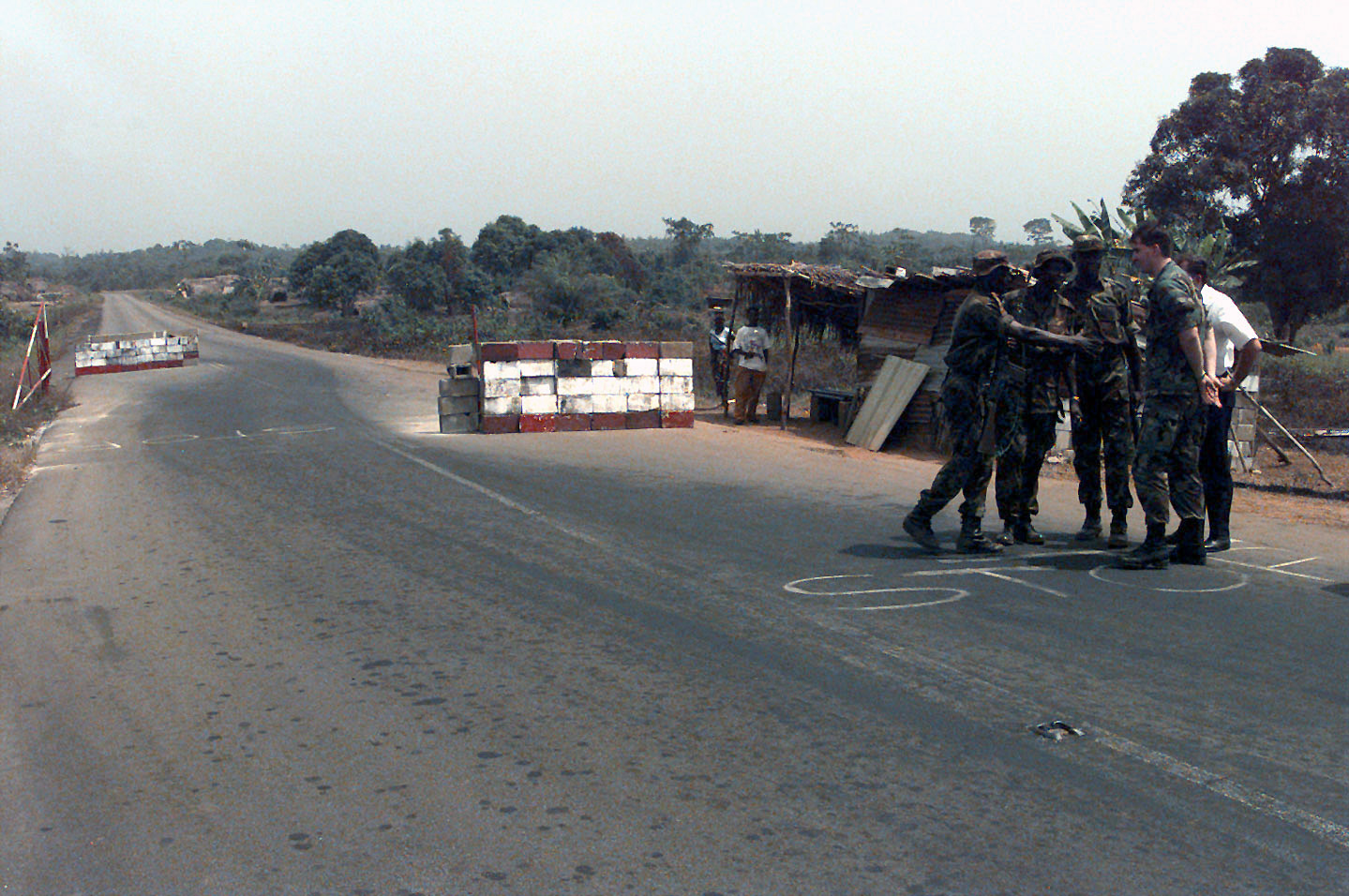
A checkpoint of Nigerian ECOMOG peacekeepers on the road between Monrovia and Roberts International Airport. The Nigerians were crucial for Roosevelt Johnson's protection; after they withdrew, his followers in the Liberian capital were purged.

The first clashes between Taylor's and Johnson's followers took place in February 1998 after Johnson had travelled to Nigeria and met with President Sani Abacha. Taylor, who was generally extremely hostile toward Nigeria and resented its influence over West Africa, believed that Johnson's trip indicated that his rival and the Nigerian government plotted to overthrow him. Thus, when Johnson returned later that month, Benjamin Yeaten's feared Special Security Service (SSS) arrived at Roberts International Airport to apprehend him. The former warlord's guards fought back, however, and eventually Johnson had to be transported back to Monrovia protected by heavily armed Nigerian peacekeepers. The SSS again attacked Johnson's followers in March, as he travelled to the United States for medical treatment. Taylor once again believed that his rival's trip was in reality an attempt to plot against his government. The United States' government, however, had little interest in getting involved in the disputes between the two Liberian politicians as it mistrusted both. On 6 June, six members of Johnson's faction were apprehended by security forces at Roberts International Airport and "disappeared".

Eventually, however, the Nigerian peacekeepers were withdrawn from Liberia, leaving Johnson without his international protection. On 18 September 1998 Taylor's followers finally made their move to completely purge the capital of Johnson and his loyalists, though officially they were only supposed to "disarm" them. More than one hundred Special Operation Division and Executive Mansion Special Security Unit paramilitaries attacked Camp Johnson Road from two sides. The two units, commanded by Yeaten and Charles Taylor's son Chucky respectively, were aiming at completely destroying any opposition and fired at the compound with automatic weapons and RPGs, taking no heed of the civilians that lived at Camp Johnson Road. Though the defenders fought back, they "were no match for Taylor's well-trained and fiercely loyal" forces. Johnson's men called the U.S. embassy, pleading them to send aid in form of the remaining peacekeepers in the city, but these requests were ignored. Fighting lasted throughout the night, and by early 19 September the compound was cleared of Johnson's followers; nearly all of the defenders, about three hundred, were dead along with dozens of civilians.

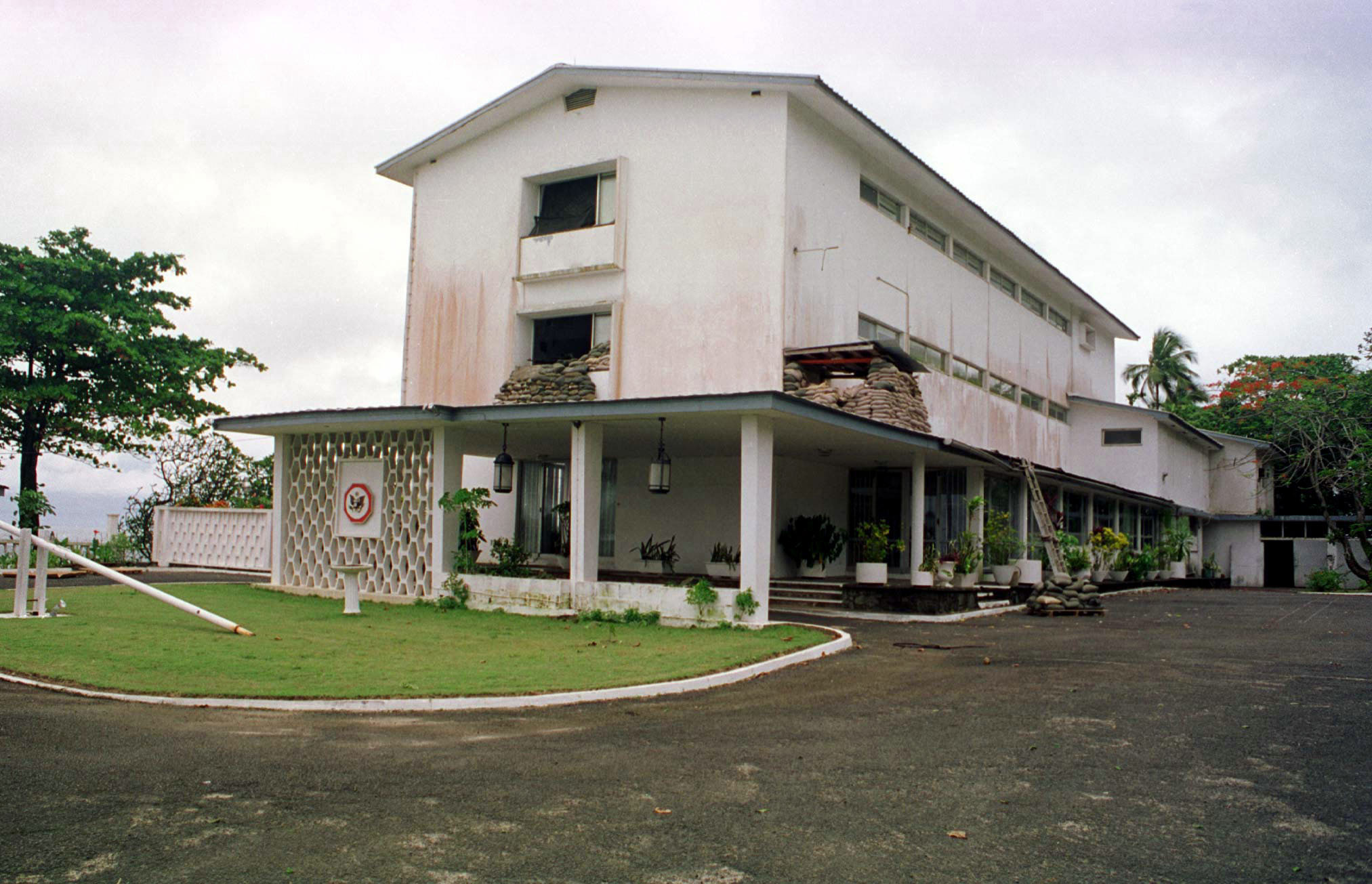
United States embassy in Monrovia

Roosevelt Johnson, however, had managed to slip through the attackers' lines during the chaos of the battle. With a few surviving followers he made his way to the U.S. embassy in hopes to gain protection there. When the small group arrived at the embassy's gates, their pursuers had caught up with them and a firefight ensued. Initially, the U.S. guards present refused to allow Johnson's men inside, but as it became clear that they were about to be killed, the U.S. security officers allowed them at least to seek shelter behind a wall that protected the embassy's entry. At first, Taylor's men hesitated to attack the embassy, but eventually Taylor's police chief ordered the paramilitaries to "go get them". Taylor's followers opened fire, killing four of Johnson's followers while the rest managed to escape onto the embassy compound. The Liberian government fighters then tried to storm the embassy's main gate security screening area, indiscriminately firing their weapons in an attempt to kill the fleeing Johnson. Two Americans were wounded in the firefight, one Department of State official and one contractor, causing the U.S. guards to respond by returning fire, killing two of the attackers. This prompted one of Taylor's fighters to fire a RPG at the embassy, but it missed and fell into the ocean. As it became clear to the Liberian security forces that they could not force Johnson out of the embassy, the assault ceased.

=== Riots and massacres ===
After the defeat of Johnson's armed faction, the Liberian security forces went on a killing spree, murdering at least hundreds, possibly even more than one thousand Krahn civilians in Monrovia. According to purported eyewitnesses, government soldiers committed massacres at the St. Thomas Church near Camp Johnson Road and the refugees centres at the Old Public Works Ministry Building as well as the Old Internal Affairs Ministry Building, where they "shot, and bayoneted hundreds of people". The Matadi Housing Estate, mostly occupied by Krahn, was looted, with the women being raped and the men abducted and later shot. Eleven Kran military officers were also reportedly executed. Sometimes the government militias killed their victims on broad daylight in view of the U.S. embassy.

== Aftermath ==
The United States subsequently evacuated half of the embassy's staff, and deployed a small group of Navy SEALs as additional protection force. The U.S. government refused to turn Johnson over to Taylor, knowing that he would not receive a fair trial. A standoff ensued that lasted about one week until Johnson and his surviving loyalists were evacuated by the United States to Ghana. The U.S. government then demanded an apology from the Liberian government for the attack on the embassy and also sought a United Nations investigation. Taylor reluctantly apologized for the incident in November 1998.

The mass killings after the clashes drove hundreds of Krahn to flee the country; some of these exiles, namely ex-ULIMO fighters, eventually began an insurgency against Taylor that would escalate into the Second Liberian Civil War.

The clashes in Monrovia also marked the first military action of Chucky Taylor's unit, then known as the Executive Mansion Special Security Unit. Later transformed into the Anti-Terrorist Unit, it would become one of the most brutal and feared government militias during the second civil war.

== Bibliography ==
- Dwyer, Johnny (2015). American Warlord. A true story. New York City: Vintage Books.
- Lidow, Nicholai Hart (2016). Violent Order. Understanding Rebel Governance through Liberia's Civil War. Cambridge: Cambridge University Press.
- Corsun, Andrew (1998). Political Violence against Americans. Washington, D.C.: Bureau of Diplomatic Security.
