= Roosevelt Johnson =

Liberian rebel leader (died 2004)

- Birth name: David Roosevelt Johnson
- Born: Liberia
- Died: October 23, 2004 Nigeria
- Allegiance: Liberia
- Branch: Liberian Armed Forces

David Roosevelt Johnson (died October 23, 2004) was a Liberian military officer and warlord who led the ULIMO rebel group during the First Liberian Civil War. He was not a member of the Krahn ethnic group that he fought for; however, his wife was of that ethnic group.

== Biography ==
A former teacher, Johnson joined the rebel group United Liberation Movement of Liberia for Democracy (ULIMO) soon after the war began. ULIMO split into two factions in 1994: United Liberation Movement of Liberia for Democracy-Kromah faction (ULIMO-K) led by Alhaji G.V. Kromah and the United Liberation Movement of Liberia for Democracy-Johnson faction (ULIMO-J), which was led by Johnson.

Johnson had 6 sons in Liberia. Jotham, his eldest, would take care of the rest of his brothers while Johnson had been on rebel missions. Nigel, Justin, Rob, Hye and Igor had lived without knowing much about their father, as Johnson had hardly been home to care for them.

Fighters loyal to Johnson triggered the first major violation of the Abuja Accord in December 1995, resisting ECOMOG deployment around the diamond mines near Tubmanburg. He was dismissed from the ULIMO-J leadership in early 1996.

Like many involved in the Liberian civil war, Johnson was known to use mercenary fighters to further his causes. One notable example was his funding of Joshua Milton Blahyi, commonly known as General Butt Naked. The General commanded a brigade of drunken or otherwise intoxicated young teenage boys who would fight naked or in women's clothing because of a belief that it would protect them from bullets.

In September 1998, Taylor's government accused Johnson of plotting a coup d'état. Johnson's faction in Monrovia was attacked by President Charles Taylor's security forces, resulting in brutal clashes that saw most of his followers being killed. He managed to flee to the American embassy and Taylor demanded that the Americans turn him over for what he guarantees will be a fair trial. But Washington said the assault at the embassy gate made that promise unreliable. Another shootout occurred as Taylor's fighters attempted to prevent him from finding sanctuary on the embassy grounds. Johnson, his son, and his few surviving followers were allowed into the embassy, however, where they were protected by U.S. guards until being evacuated to Ghana.

He eventually relocated to Nigeria. He was charged with treason and convicted in absentia, in April 1999. He died in 2004 in Nigeria, following a protracted period of illness.

== Bibliography ==
- Dwyer, Johnny (2015). American Warlord. A true story. New York City: Vintage Books.
