= Krahn people =

Ethnic group in West Africa

Krahn
Total population
- 214,000

Regions with significant populations
- Ivory Coast: 116,000
- Liberia: 98,000

Languages
- Krahn (Western, Eastern, Southern)

Religion
- Primarily: Ethnic religions • Ivory Coast: Christianity (<5%); Evangelical (3%) • Liberia: Christianity (>5%); Evangelical (3.5%)

Related ethnic groups
- Wee peoples; Guéré peoples; Sapo peoples; Wobe peoples; Ngere peoples, Bassa, Grebo, Kru, Jabo

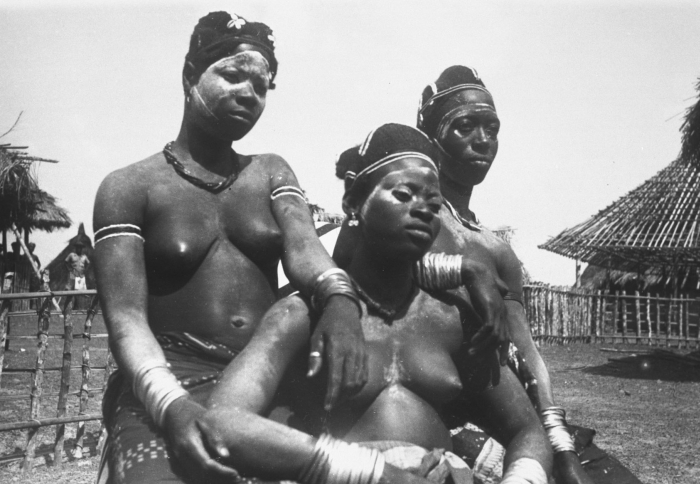

The Krahn are an ethnic group of Liberia and Ivory Coast. This group belongs to the Kru language family and its people are sometimes referred to as the Wee, Guéré, Sapo, or Wobe. It is likely that Western contact with the Kru language is the primary reason for the development of these different names.

== History ==
The Krahn arrived in an area of Liberia previously known as the "Grain Coast" as part of early 16th-century migrations from the northeast and what is now Ivory Coast. This migration occurred due to pressure on local populations resulting from the emigration of ethnic groups from western Sudan after the decline of medieval empires, as well as an increase in regional wars.

At the time, the African slave trade was becoming more prominent within Liberia. Some Kru subgroups were sold into slavery by their neighbours, but it was more common for the Krahn and other coastal peoples in Liberia to serve as local traders, brokering deals within the Western slave market. Many Kru committed suicide rather than face enslavement.

=== Liberian Civil Wars ===
During the late 1970s, Liberia faced heated civil unrest in which opposition to the Americo-Liberian and Tolbert government led to a military coup, organized in part by indigenous tribal members. The tension culminated in coup on April 12, 1980, in which Master Sergeant Samuel Kanyon Doe, a member of the Krahn ethnic group and leader of the group involved in the coup, seized power, becoming Liberia's first native leader and head of state. With a Krahn leader serving as a key political figure, the once disparaged Krahn were now more prominently included in Liberia's governing body.

This rise in status led many Krahn speakers to move to the capital, Monrovia. Doe began showing favoritism to the Krahn, particularly to those from his own tribal group. These measures included appointing members of the Krahn's ethnic kin from Ivory Coast, known more commonly as the Wee, to the Executive Mansion Guard, as well as taking steps to prevent people of other ethnicities from reaching key government positions.

By 1985, Doe's response to his opposition created a large "anti-Doe" contingent. In December 1989, exiles and local recruits began organizing military groups and eventually invaded Liberia from Ivory Coast, resulting in a full-scale civil war against Doe and his Krahn supporters. As this war progressed, the National Patriotic Front of Liberia (NPFL) began attacking Krahn civilians in Nimba and Grand Gedeh counties, destroying entire communities as they moved through the country.

By mid-1990 the war had escalated, prompting foreign intervention. Doe was kidnapped and executed by opposition forces. Following the removal of the Doe regime and the continuation of the civil war, Krahn refugees began fleeing from Liberia to Ivory Coast, some taking the Krahn language with them.

Although Doe was removed from power in 1990, the civil war did not officially end until 1997, at which time the NPFL's leader Charles Taylor ran for the presidency, winning the 1997 general election amid much controversy. Because of their opposition to Taylor and their affiliation with the previous regime and with rebel groups like ULIMO, Taylor initiated a crackdown against the Krahn. In 1998, Taylor attempted to murder one of his political opponents, the former warlord Roosevelt Johnson, causing clashes in Monrovia, during and after which hundreds of Krahn were massacred and hundreds more fled Liberia. This event was one of the factors that led to the outbreak of the Second Liberian Civil War.

In 2003, members of the Krahn tribe founded a rebel group, the Movement for Democracy in Liberia (MODEL), opposing Taylor. The group disbanded as part of the peace agreement at the end of the second civil war.

=== Recent history ===
The stability that followed the civil war has allowed the Krahn to resettle throughout the country. As of 2022, Krahn are typically found in Nimba, Grand Gedeh, and Sinoe counties, as well as Ivory Coast.

== Culture ==
Liberia's Krahn were originally hunters, fishermen and farmers, traditionally focusing on rice and cassava production. Slow or failing development of regions with many Krahn settlers led many of the younger Krahn generations to migrate to areas such as Monrovia. The Wee in Ivory Coast were hunters, fishermen and farmers as well, though they tended to focus more heavily on crops such as "rice, yams, taro, manioc, maize, and bananas." Like the Krahn in Liberia, the Wee traditions of hunting and farming have become unsustainable, and in more recent years many have taken work in diamond camps and on rubber plantations.

=== Early political structures ===
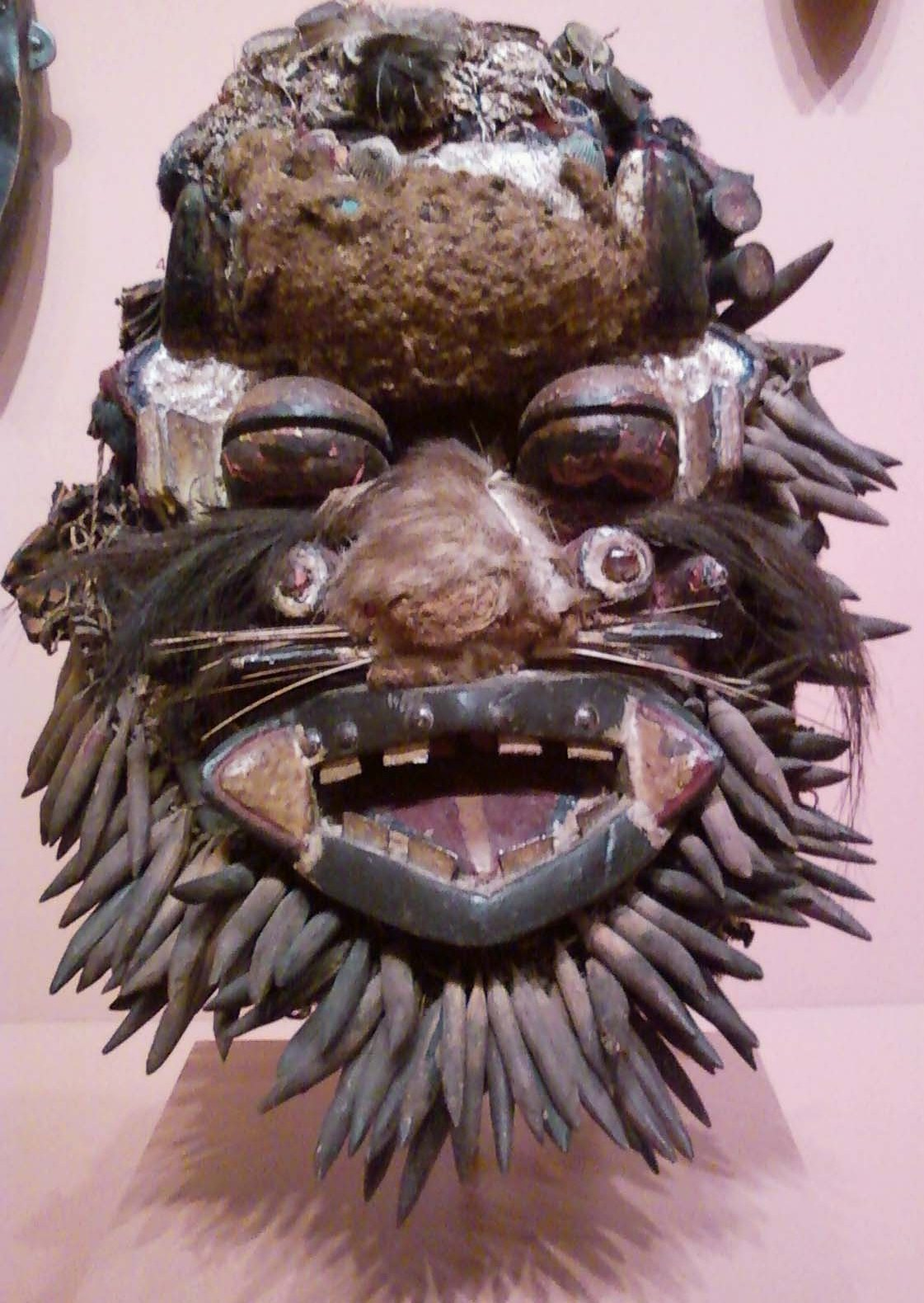
Wee Face mask on exhibit at the Indianapolis Museum of Art

Early Krahn political organizations were traditionally decentralized in both Liberia and Ivory Coast. Often, tribes did not have a central governing power, instead turning to a village "headman" who rose to a position of social esteem through skill, hard work, and luck in hunting and farming. These individuals often formed councils consisting of young warriors for protection and village elders to serve as consultants in village affairs. This governing group would broker trades with neighboring tribes, as well as make important decisions for the tribe members.

Within these tribal groups, it was not uncommon for ceremonial face masks to serve dual roles in rituals and politics. These masks were often modeled after animals and were utilized in community mediations. They may also have been a means of implementing social control in the years prior to adoption of Western laws during the colonial period.

=== Religion ===
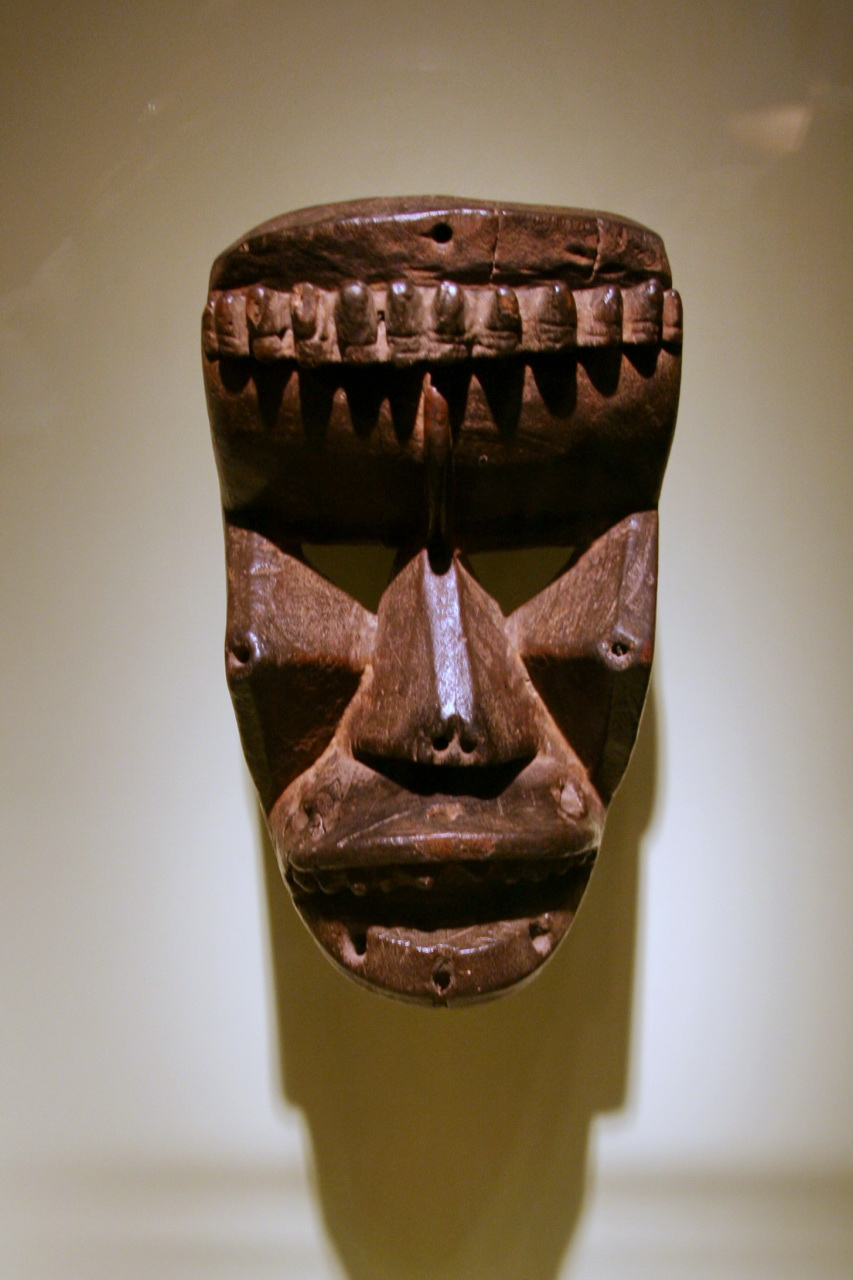
A Krahn mask on exhibit at the National Museum of African Art in Washington, D.C.

Many Krahn people believe that objects have spirits or souls (animism). The Wee of Ivory Coast also believe that the natural world is made up of "bush spirits." These spirits are part of the world untouched by man, and the Wee believe that keeping these spirits appeased is vital to the health of the tribe. Whenever new land requires cultivating for fields or expansion, or when tribesmen needed to venture outside the village, it becomes necessary to make offerings to the spirits. It is further believed that the bush spirits take corporeal form in order to interact with the villagers and participate in ceremonies. The Wee believe that the bush spirits can communicate with humans through dreams, often demanding ceremonial masks be created in their honor in either male or female form. These masks then serve a variety of functions, ranging from ritual ceremonies, entertainment, and focal points in moral stories to judicial and political controls. Typically, female masks are viewed as less imposing and more beautiful than male masks and are in turn used more for ritual and entertainment purposes, while the male masks are often more ferocious-looking and used in sociopolitical contexts. All Wee masks are believed to deflect sorcery, and many undergo shifts in their primary function during their lifetime.

== Language ==
The Krahn language is one of the Kru languages in the Niger–Congo language family. Although many Kru-speaking tribes have adopted English as their second language, recent studies have shown that Kru is still spoken by many Liberians. Within the Kru languages there are several subcategories, with Eastern and Western Kru offering the first significant division of tribal language breakdowns. Krahn falls under the Western Kru, Wee subgroup.

Some scholars further denote a difference between Eastern and Western Krahn, with Eastern variations typically spoken in northeast Liberia and Western Krahn spoken throughout Grand Gedeh County and Ivory Coast. As of 2020, there were approximately 99,000 Eastern Krahn speakers within Liberia, with an additional 100,000 Western Krahn speakers in Liberia and, according to a 1993 estimate, 12,000 in Ivory Coast.

== See also ==
- Ethnic groups in Africa

== Bibliography ==
- Dwyer, Johnny (2015). American Warlord. A true story. New York City: Vintage Books.
- Lidow, Nicholai Hart (2016). Violent Order. Understanding Rebel Governance through Liberia's Civil War. Cambridge: Cambridge University Press.
