= First Liberian Civil War =

1989–1997 war in West Africa

- Part of the West African Crisis
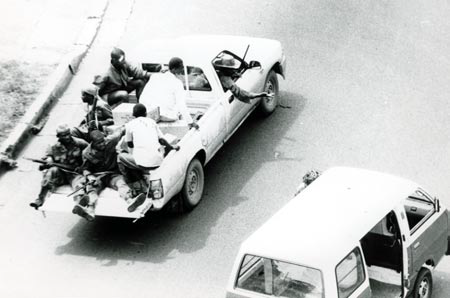
- INPFL militiamen in 1990 after taking control of much of Monrovia
Date	24 December 1989 – 2 August 1997 (7 years, 7 months, 1 week and 2 days)
Location	Liberia
Result	NPFL victory: Overthrow of the Doe government in 1990; Charles Taylor elected President of Liberia in 1997

Belligerents
(Liberia) Liberian government; (Liberia) Loyalist Armed Forces elements; (Liberia) ULIMO (1991–1994); (Liberia) ULIMO-K (1994–1996); (Liberia) ULIMO-J (1994–1996); (Liberia) LPC (1993–1996); (Liberia) LUDF (later becoming ULIMO); (Liberia) LDF (1993–1996) Supported by: ECOMOG; Nigeria (from 1990); Ghana (from 1990); Guinea (from 1990); The Gambia (from 1990); Sierra Leone (1990–1991); (United Nations) UNOMIL (1993–1997)	Anti-Doe Armed Forces elements; Greater Liberia; NPFL; (Liberia) INPFL (1989–1992); (Liberia) NPFL-CRC (1994–1996) Supported by: Libya; Burkina Faso; Liberated Zone; RUF

Commanders and leaders
(Liberia) Samuel Doe (executed) (President); (Liberia) Hezekiah Bowen (Commander-in-chief of the AFL); ULIMO: (Liberia) Alhaji Kromah (ULIMO-K since 1994) (Liberia) Roosevelt Johnson (ULIMO-J since 1994) (Liberia) Raleigh Seekie † (Liberia) General Butt Naked (ULIMO-J since 1994) (Liberia) Jungle Jabbah (ULIMO-K since 1994); LPC: (Liberia) George Boley; LUDF: (Liberia) Albert Karpeh †; FDL: (Liberia) Francois Massaquoi; Foreign support: (Nigeria) Sani Abacha	(Liberia) Charles Taylor; (Liberia) Benjamin Yeaten; (Liberia) Isaac Musa; (Liberia) Bill Horace; (Liberia) Prince Johnson; (Liberia) Sam Dokie †; (Liberia) Tom Woewiyu; Foday Sankoh; (History of Libya under Muammar Gaddafi) Muammar Gaddafi; (Burkina Faso) Blaise Compaoré

Strength
450,000	350,000

Casualties and losses
- Total killed: ~200,000 including civilians

The First Liberian Civil War was the first of two civil wars within the West African nation of Liberia. It lasted between 1989 and 1997. The war was triggered by political, economic, and ethic tensions in the country, which were exacerbated by President Samuel Doe's regime of totalitarianism and widespread corruption.

== Overview ==
In December 1989, the National Patriotic Front of Liberia (NPFL) led by Charles Taylor invaded Liberia from Ivory Coast to overthrow Doe, and gained control over most of Liberia within a year.

Doe was captured, tortured, and executed by the Independent National Patriotic Front of Liberia (INPFL), a splinter faction of the NPFL led by Prince Johnson, in September 1990. The NPFL and INPFL then fought each other for control of the capital city, Monrovia and against the Armed Forces of Liberia and pro-Doe United Liberation Movement of Liberia for Democracy.

In 1995, peace negotiations and foreign involvement led to a ceasefire. Fighting continued until a peace agreement between the main factions occurred in August 1996. Taylor was elected President of Liberia following the 1997 Liberian general election and entered office in August 1997.

The First Liberian Civil War killed around 200,000 people and eventually led to an intervention by the Economic Community of West African States (ECOWAS) and the United Nations. The peace lasted for two years until the Second Liberian Civil War broke out when anti-Taylor forces invaded Liberia from Guinea in April 1999.

== Background ==
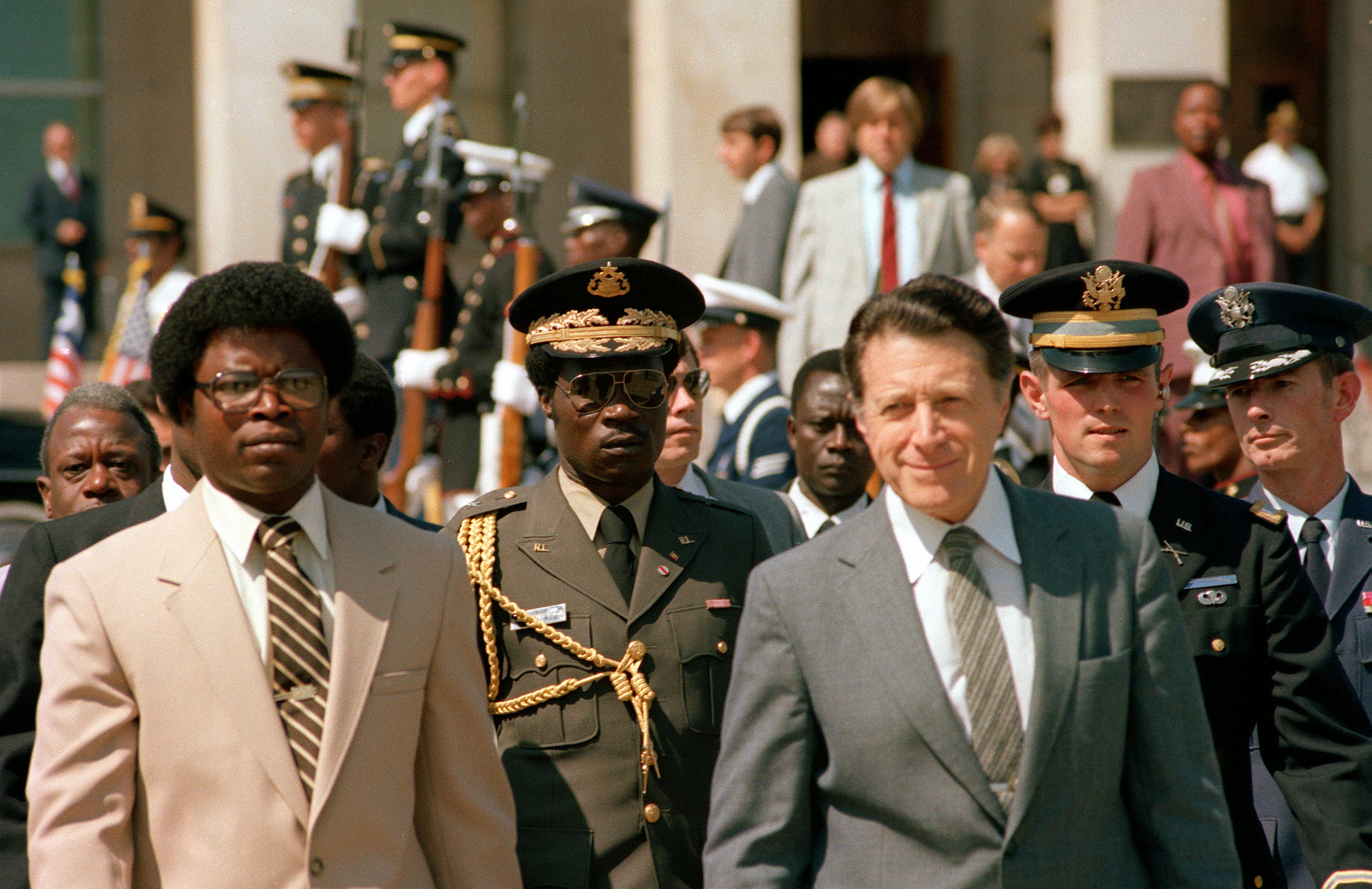
Samuel Doe with US Secretary of Defense Caspar W. Weinberger outside of the Pentagon in 1982.

=== Samuel Doe takes power in coup (1980) ===
In 1980, Samuel Doe took power in a popular rebellion against the Liberian Government, becoming the first native Liberian President. Doe was a member of the Krahn ethnic group. Doe established a military regime called the People's Redemption Council and enjoyed support from Liberian ethnic groups who were denied power since the founding of Liberia in 1847.

Any hope that Doe would improve the way Liberia was run was put aside as he quickly clamped down on opposition, fueled by his paranoia of a counter-coup attempt against him. As promised, Doe held elections in 1985 and won the presidency by just enough of a margin to avoid a runoff. However, international monitors condemned this election as fraudulent.

=== Coup attempt by Thomas Quiwonkpa (November 1985) ===
In 1985, Thomas Quiwonkpa, the former Commanding General of the Armed Forces of Liberia, whom Doe had demoted and forced to flee the country, attempted to overthrow Doe's regime from neighbouring Sierra Leone. The coup attempt failed and Quiwonkpa was killed and allegedly eaten. His body was publicly exhibited on the grounds of the Executive Mansion in Monrovia soon after his death.

=== Mistreatment of the Gio and Mano ethnic groups (1985) ===
The Gio and Mano ethnic groups were persecuted because they were suspected of treason and were seen as inferiors to the President's own tribe, the Krahn. The mistreatment of the Gio and Mano increased tensions in Liberia, which had already been rising due to Doe's preferential treatment of his own group.

=== Charles Taylor builds insurgent forces (1985–1989) ===
Charles Taylor, who had left Doe's government after being accused of embezzlement, assembled a group of rebels in Côte d'Ivoire, mostly ethnic Gios and Manos who felt persecuted by Doe, who later became known as the National Patriotic Front of Liberia (NPFL). They invaded Nimba County on 24 December 1989.

The Liberian Army retaliated against the whole population of the region, attacking unarmed civilians, mainly of the Mandingo tribe, and burning villages. Many left as refugees for Guinea and Côte d'Ivoire, but opposition to Doe was inflamed. Prince Johnson, an NPFL fighter, split to form his own guerrilla force soon after crossing the border, based on the Gio tribe and named the Independent National Patriotic Front of Liberia (INPFL).

== Events of the War - Timeline ==
=== Charles Taylor's force attacks (1989) ===
Charles Taylor organized and trained indigenous northerners in Ivory Coast. During Doe's regime, Taylor served in the Liberian Government's General Services Agency, acting 'as its de facto director'. In 1983, he fled to the United States amid what Stephan Ellis describes as the 'increasingly menacing atmosphere in Monrovia' shortly before Thomas Quiwonkpa, Doe's chief lieutenant, fled into exile. Doe requested Taylor's extradition for embezzling $900,000 of Liberian government funds. Taylor was thus arrested in the United States and after sixteen months broke out of a Massachusetts jail in circumstances that are still unclear.

=== Ethnic conflict and siege of Monrovia (1989-1990) ===
Map of advances of NPFL and INPFL rebels on Monrovia from December 1989 to September 1990

Charles Taylor's NPFL forces initially encountered plenty of support within Nimba County, which had endured the majority of Samuel Doe's wrath after the 1985 attempted coup. Thousands of ethnic Gio and Mano joined when Taylor and his force of 100 rebels reentered Liberia in 1989, on Christmas Eve. Doe responded by sending two AFL battalions, including the 1st Infantry Battalion, to Nimba in December 1989 – January 1990, under then-Colonel Hezekiah Bowen.

The AFL acted in a very brutal and scorched-earth fashion, which quickly alienated the local people. The rebel assault soon pitted ethnic Krahn sympathetic to the Doe regime against those victimized by it, the Gio and the Mano. Thousands of civilians were massacred on both sides. Hundreds of thousands fled their homes. The Monrovia Church massacre was carried out by approximately 30 ethnic Krahn government soldiers, killing 600 civilians in St. Peter's Lutheran Church, Monrovia, on 29 July 1990, the worst single atrocity of the First Liberian Civil War.

By May 1990, the AFL had been forced back to Gbarnga, still under the control of Bowen's troops. On 28 May, the Liberian army lost the town to a NPFL assault. By June 1990, Taylor's forces were laying siege to Monrovia. In July 1990, Prince Yormie Johnson split from Taylor and formed the Independent National Patriotic Front (INPFL). The INPFL and NPFL continued their siege on Monrovia, which the AFL defended.

In their Freedom in the World report for 1990, Freedom House described Monrovia in July as "a virtual ghost town of starving people and rotting corpses" as the rebel advance on the city caused widespread panic and anarchy, leading to Liberian soldiers looting shops and killing civilians at random, all while hunger and disease quickly took hold. Johnson swiftly took control of parts of Monrovia, prompting the evacuation of foreign nationals and diplomats by the US Navy in August.

=== ECOWAS intervention force (August 1990) ===
In August 1990, the 16-member Economic Community of West African States (ECOWAS) agreed to deploy a joint military intervention force, the Economic Community Monitoring Group (ECOMOG), and placed it under Nigerian leadership. The mission later included troops from non-ECOWAS countries, including Uganda and Tanzania. ECOMOG's objectives were to impose a cease-fire; help Liberians establish an interim government until elections could be held; stop the killing of innocent civilians; and ensure the safe evacuation of foreign nationals.

ECOMOG also sought to prevent the conflict from spreading into neighboring states, which share a complex history of state, economic, and ethno-linguistic social relations with Liberia. The Economic Community of West African States (ECOWAS) attempted to persuade Doe to resign and go into exile, but despite his weak position – besieged in his mansion – he refused. On August 24, 1990, ECOMOG, an ECOWAS intervention force, arrived at the Freeport of Monrovia, landing from Nigerian and Ghanaian vessels.

=== Capture and killing of Samuel Doe (September 1990) ===
On 9 September 1990, Doe visited the newly established ECOMOG headquarters in the Free Port of Maher. According to Stephen Ellis, his motive was to complain that the ECOMOG commander had not paid a courtesy call to him as the Head of State; however, the exact circumstances that led to Doe's visit to the Free Port are still unclear. Doe had been under pressure to accept exile outside of Liberia. After Doe arrived, a large rebel force led by Prince Johnson's INPFL arrived and attacked Doe's party. Doe was captured and taken to the INPFL's Caldwell base. He was brutally tortured before being killed and dismembered. His torture and execution was videotaped by his captors.

Johnson's INPFL and Taylor's NPFL continued to struggle for control of Monrovia in the months that followed. With military discipline absent and bloodshed throughout the capital region, members of ECOWAS created the Economic Community Monitoring Group (ECOMOG) to restore order. The force comprised some 4,000 troops from Nigeria, Ghana, Sierra Leone, the Gambia and Guinea. ECOMOG succeeded in bringing Taylor and Johnson to agree to its intervention. Taylor's forces later fought against ECOMOG in the port area of Monrovia.

=== Peacemaking attempts (1990) ===
A series of peacemaking conferences in regional capitals followed. There were meetings in Bamako in November 1990, Lomé in January 1991, and Yamoussoukro in June–October 1991. The first seven peace conferences failed, including the Yamoussoukro I-IV processes. In November 1990, ECOWAS invited the principal Liberian players to meet in Banjul, Gambia to form a government of national unity.

The negotiated settlement established the Interim Government of National Unity (IGNU), led by Dr. Amos Sawyer, leader of the LPP. Bishop Ronald Diggs of the Liberian Council of Churches became vice president. Taylor's NPFL refused to attend the conference. Within days, hostilities resumed. ECOMOG was reinforced in order to protect the interim government. Sawyer was able to establish his authority over most of Monrovia, but the rest of Liberia was in the hands of factions of the NPFL, or local gangs.

=== ULIMO (1991) ===
In June 1991, the United Liberation Movement of Liberia for Democracy (ULIMO) was formed by supporters of the late President Samuel K. Doe and former Armed Forces of Liberia (AFL) fighters who had taken refuge in Guinea and Sierra Leone. It was led by Raleigh Seekie, a deputy Minister of Finance in the Doe government.

In September 1991, after fighting alongside the Sierra Leonean army against the Sierra Leonean Revolutionary United Front (RUF) rebels, ULIMO forces entered western Liberia. The group scored significant gains in areas held by another rebel group – Taylor's National Patriotic Front of Liberia (NPFL), notably around the diamond mining areas of Lofa and Bomi counties.

From its outset, ULIMO was beset with internal divisions. In 1994, the group effectively broke into two separate militias: The ULIMO-J, an ethnic Krahn faction led by General Roosevelt Johnson; and the ULIMO-K, a Mandingo-based faction led by Alhaji G.V. Kromah.

ULIMO was alleged to have committed serious violations of human rights, both before and after its breakup.

=== Attack on Monrovia (1992) ===
Peace was still far off as both Taylor and Johnson claimed power. ECOMOG declared an Interim Government of National Unity (IGNU) with Amos Sawyer as their president, with the broad support of Johnson. On October 15, 1992, Taylor launched an assault on Monrovia, named 'Operation Octopus' which may have been led by Burkina Faso soldiers. The resulting siege lasted two months.

By late December 1992, ECOMOG had pushed the NPFL back beyond Monrovia's suburbs.

=== UNOMIL (1993-1994) ===
Development of the Liberian Civil War from 1992 to 1994 with furthest extent of anti-Taylor groups at September 1994

In 1993, ECOWAS brokered a peace agreement in Cotonou, Benin. On September 22, 1993, the United Nations (U.N.) Security Council established the UN Observer Mission in Liberia (UNOMIL), to support ECOMOG in implementing this peace agreement. In early 1994, UNOMIL was deployed, with 368 military observers and civilian personnel to monitor the implementation of the Cotonou Peace Agreement, prior to elections originally planned for February/March 1994.

In May 1994, renewed armed hostilities broke out and continued, becoming especially intense in July and August. ECOMOG, and later UNOMIL, members were captured and held hostage by some factions. By mid-1994, the humanitarian situation had become disastrous, with 1.8 million Liberians in need of humanitarian assistance. Conditions continued to deteriorate. Humanitarian agencies were unable to reach many in need due to the hostilities and general insecurity.

In September 1994, factional leaders agreed to the Akosombo Agreement, a supplement to the Cotonou agreement, named after the Benin city where it was signed. The security situation in Liberia remained poor. In October 1994, in the face of ECOMOG funding shortfalls and a lack of will by the Liberian combatants to honor the agreements to end the war, the UN Security Council reduced the number of UNOMIL observers to about 90. The UN extended UNOMIL's mandate and subsequently extended it several times until September 1997.

In December 1994, the factions and other parties signed the Accra Agreement, a supplement to the Akosombo Agreement. Disagreements ensued, and fighting continued.

=== Ceasefire (1995) ===
In August 1995, the main factions signed an agreement largely brokered by Ghanaian President Jerry Rawlings. At a conference sponsored by ECOWAS, the United Nations and the United States, the European Union, and the Organization of African Unity, Charles Taylor agreed to a cease-fire.

At the beginning of September 1995, Liberia's three principal warlords – Taylor, George Boley and Alhaji Kromah – made theatrical entrances into Monrovia. A ruling council of six members under civilian Wilton G. S. Sankawulo and with the three factional heads Taylor, Kromah and Boley, took control of Liberia, in preparation for elections that were originally scheduled for 1996.

=== Fighting in Monrovia (1996) ===
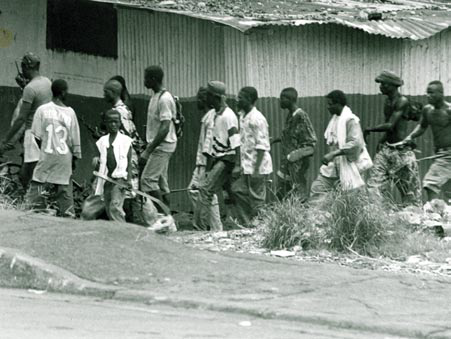
NPFL fighters search for ULIMO militants in Monrovia, 1996

In April 1996, heavy fighting broke out again. This led to the evacuation of most international non-governmental organizations and the destruction of much of Monrovia. The U.S. military's Operation Assured Response evacuated 485 Americans and over 2,400 citizens from 68 countries.

In August 1996, fighting stopped after the Abuja Accord in Nigeria, agreeing to disarmament and demobilization by 1997 and elections in July 1997. In September 1996, Sankawulo was followed by Ruth Perry as the chairwoman of the ruling council, who served until August 1997.

=== Elections (1997) ===
In July 1997, simultaneous elections for the presidency and national assembly were held. In a climate hardly conducive to free movement and security of persons, Taylor and his National Patriotic Party won an overwhelming victory against 12 candidates. Assisted by widespread intimidation, Taylor took 75 per cent of the presidential poll. No other candidate won more than 10 per cent. The NPP won a similar proportion of seats in both parliamentary chambers. On 2 August 1997, Ruth Perry handed power to the elected president Charles Taylor.

== Aftermath ==
In 1997, the Liberian people elected Charles Taylor as the President after he entered the capital city, Monrovia, by force. Liberians voted for Taylor in the hope that he would end the bloodshed. The bloodshed slowed considerably, but it did not end. Violent events flared up regularly after the putative end of the war. Taylor was accused of backing guerrillas in neighboring countries and funneling diamond money into arms purchases for the rebel armies he supported, and into luxuries for himself. The implicit unrest in the late 1990s is emblematic in the sharp national economic decline and the prevalent sale of diamonds and timber in exchange for small arms.

After Taylor's victory, Liberia was sufficiently peaceful that refugees began to return. Other leaders were forced to leave the country, and some ULIMO forces reformed as the Liberians United for Reconciliation and Democracy (LURD). LURD began fighting in Lofa County with the aim of destabilizing the government and gaining control of the local diamond fields, leading to the Second Liberian Civil War.

In 2025, the Liberian government, under President Joseph Boakai, issued an official apology to victims of the conflict.

=== Impact ===
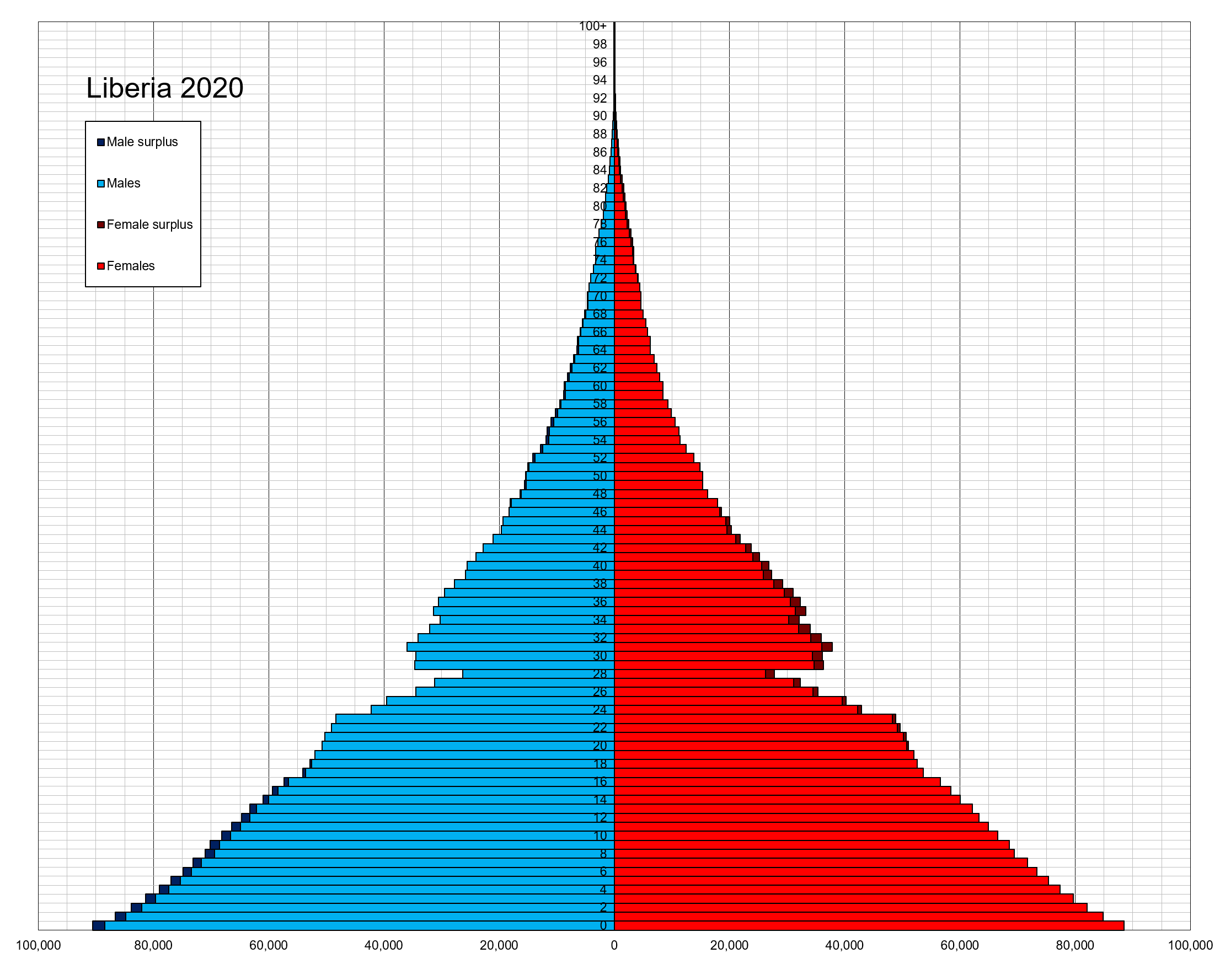
Liberia's population pyramid in 2020. The obvious "cinching" between ages 23 and 31 corresponds to the generation born during the years of the civil war. The excess female population among those aged 46 or under is due to young men and boys killed in the civil war.

The Liberian civil war was one of Africa's bloodiest. From 1989 to 1996, it claimed the lives of more than 200,000. A million people were displaced into refugee camps in neighboring countries. Child soldiers were used throughout the war.

The civil war killed one out of every 17 people in Liberia, uprooted most of the rest, and destroyed a once-viable economic infrastructure. The strife spread to Liberia's neighbors. It helped slow democratization in West Africa at the beginning of the 1990s and destabilized a region that already was one of the world's most unsteady.

== Second Liberian Civil War ==
The Second Liberian Civil War began in 1999 and ended in October 2003, when ECOWAS intervened to stop the rebel siege on Monrovia and exiled Charles Taylor to Nigeria. He was arrested in 2006 and taken to The Hague for his trial. By the conclusion of the final war, more than 250,000 people had been killed and nearly 1 million displaced. Half that number remained to be repatriated in 2005, at the election of Liberia's first democratic President since the initial 1980 coup d'état of Samuel Doe.

In January 2006, former president Ellen Johnson Sirleaf, who was initially a strong supporter of Charles Taylor, was inaugurated and the National Transitional Government of Liberia terminated its power.

Charles Taylor was sentenced to a trial in 2003, after being accused of rape and acts of sexual violence, promoting child soldiers, and an illegal ownership of weapons. He denied these accusations, but was testified against by his victims. He was sentenced to 50 years in prison.

== Lists ==
=== Armed groups that participated in the war ===
- Armed Forces of Liberia (AFL)
- Liberia Peace Council (LPC)
- Lofa Defense Force (LDF)
- National Patriotic Front of Liberia (NPFL)
  - Independent National Patriotic Front of Liberia (INPFL)
  - National Patriotic Front of Liberia-Central Revolutionary Council (NPFL-CRC)
- United Liberation Movement of Liberia for Democracy (ULIMO)
  - United Liberation Movement of Liberia for Democracy-Johnson faction (ULIMO-J)
  - United Liberation Movement of Liberia for Democracy-Kromah faction (ULIMO-K)

=== Peace agreements ===
Peace agreements signed included the:

- Banjul III Agreement (14 October 1990)
- Bamako Ceasefire Agreement (28 November 1990)
- Banjul IV Agreement (21 December 1990)
- Lomé Agreement (13 February 1991)
- Yamoussoukro IV Peace Agreement (30 October 1991)
- Geneva Agreement 1992 (7 April 1992)
- Cotonou Peace Agreement (25 July 1993)
- Akosombo Peace Agreement (12 September 1994)
- Accra Agreements/Akosombo clarification agreement (21 December 1994)
- Abuja Peace Agreement (19 August 1995)

== In literature ==
Liberia during this civil war is one of the numerous locations worldwide depicted in 1998 novel The Savage Detectives (Los Detectives Salvajes in Spanish), by the Chilean author Roberto Bolaño.

The 2020 memoir by Liberian-American author Wayétu Moore, The Dragons, The Giant, The Women, recounts her family's flight from Monrovia when she was a five year old at the onset of the war.

== See also ==
- Second Liberian Civil War

General:

- History of Liberia
