= United Liberation Movement of Liberia for Democracy =

1991–1994 pro-government militia in Liberia

- Leaders: G. V. Kromah; Raleigh F. Seekie; Roosevelt Johnson
- Dates active: 1991–1994
- Active regions: Throughout Liberia and in some parts of Sierra Leone
- Size: 18,000–25,000?
- Wars: First Liberian Civil War

The United Liberation Movement of Liberia for Democracy (ULIMO) was a pro-government militia that participated in the First Liberian Civil War (1989–1996).

ULIMO was formed in May 1991 by Krahn and Mandingo refugees and soldiers who had fought in the Armed Forces of Liberia (AFL) fighters. It was led by Alhadji Kromah and Raleigh Seekie, a deputy Minister of Finance in the Doe government. After fighting alongside the Sierra Leonean army against the Revolutionary United Front (RUF), ULIMO forces entered western Liberia in September 1991. The group scored significant gains in areas held by another rebel group – the National Patriotic Front of Liberia (NPFL), notably around the diamond mining areas of Lofa and Bomi counties.

From its outset, ULIMO was beset with internal divisions and the group effectively broke into two separate militias in 1994: ULIMO-J, an ethnic Krahn faction led by General Roosevelt Johnson, and ULIMO-K, a Mandingo-based faction led by Alhaji G. V. Kromah.

ULIMO-J was poorly ruled, which led to leadership struggles and general discontent among its fighters. It had approximately 8,000 combatants. ULIMO-K was relatively united under Kromah, in contrast to the fractious nature of the ULIMO-J. It had approximately 12,000 combatants.

The group, both before and after its breakup, committed serious violations of human rights.

== List of ULIMO Commanders ==
- Mohammed Jabbateh aka "Jungle Jabbah" (ULIMO-K since 1994)
- Roosevelt Johnson (ULIMO-J since 1994)
- Kunti Kamara
- Alieu Kosiah
- Alhadji Kromah (ULIMO-K since 1994)
- General Butt Naked (ULIMO-J since 1994)
- Raleigh Seekie
- Armah Youlo
