= List of wars involving Guinea =

This is a list of wars involving the Republic of Guinea.

Conflict	Combatant 1	Combatant 2	Results
Operation Green Sea (1970)	Guinea; PAIGC	Portugal (Guinea) Guinean dissidents	See aftermath
First Liberian Civil War (1990–1997)	(Liberia) Liberian government: (Liberia) Loyalist Armed Forces elements; (Liberia) ULIMO (1991–1994): (Liberia) ULIMO-K (1994–1996); (Liberia) ULIMO-J (1994–1996); (Liberia) LPC (1993–1996) (Liberia) LUDF (later becoming ULIMO) (Liberia) LDF (1993–1996); Supported by: ECOMOG: Nigeria (from 1990); Ghana (from 1990); Guinea (from 1990); The Gambia (from 1990); Sierra Leone (1990–1991); (United Nations) UNOMIL (1993–1997)	Anti-Doe Armed Forces elements (Liberia) NPFL (Liberia) INPFL (until 1992) (Liberia) NPFL-CRC (1994–1996); Supported by: Libya; Burkina Faso; RUF	NPFL victory: Overthrow of the Doe government in 1990; Charles Taylor elected President of Liberia in 1997
Sierra Leone Civil War (1991–2002)	Sierra Leone; SLA (before and after the AFRC); CDF (Kamajors, Tamaboros, Kapras, etc.); Foreign mercenaries; United Kingdom (2000–2002); Guinea; ECOMOG forces (1998–2000); Executive Outcomes (1995–1996); Supported by: United States; Belarus; (United Nations) UNAMSIL; Bangladesh; India; Pakistan (2001–2005); Kenya; Russia (1999–2005); Ukraine (1999–2005); Nigeria; Norway; New Zealand; Ghana; Jordan; Germany	RUF; (Sierra Leone) AFRC (1997–2002); West Side Boys (1998–2000); Liberia (1997–2002); NPFL (1991–2002); Foreign mercenaries; Supported by: Libya; Burkina Faso; Senegal	Commonwealth victory
Guinea-Bissau Civil War (1998–1999)	Guinea-Bissau; Senegal; Guinea	Military rebels MFDC	Ousting of President João Bernardo Vieira
Second Liberian Civil War (1999–2003)	(Liberia) Rebel groups: Anti-Taylor Armed Forces elements; LURD; MODEL; Guinea; Sierra Leone; Supported by: Ivory Coast; United Kingdom; United States	(Liberia) Liberian government: Loyalist Armed Forces elements; ATU; SOD; SSS; NPFL/NPP militias; RUF; RDFG	Rebel victory: Resignation of Charles Taylor and subsequent exile; Transitional Government of Liberia installed; Accra Peace Agreement signed; United Nations Mission in Liberia deployed
RFDG Insurgency (2000–2001)	Guinea: Young Volunteers; LURD	RFDG; Liberia; RUF; Supported by Burkina Faso	Victory: Insurgents defeated
