= Accra Comprehensive Peace Agreement =

2003 peace treaty ending the Second Liberian Civil War

Accra Peace Agreement
Accra Comprehensive Peace Agreement
- Signed: 18 August 2003
- Location: Accra
- Signatories: Government of the Republic of Liberia, the Liberians United for Reconciliation and Democracy (LURD) and the Movement for Democracy in Liberia (MODEL). In addition, a number of political parties signed: National Patriotic Party, Unity Party, Liberian People's Party, National Reformation Party, Labor Party, Liberia Unification Party, Liberian Action Party, People's Democratic Party, National democratic Party, Free Democratic Party, Reformation Alliance Party, All-Liberian Coalition Party, True Whig Party, United People's Party, Liberia National Union, Equal Rights Party, Progressive Peoples Party, and the New Deal Movement.
- Language: English

The Accra Comprehensive Peace Agreement or Accra Peace Agreement was the final peace agreement in the Second Liberian Civil War. It was signed on 18 August 2003 in Accra, Ghana. It was created following the signing of a ceasefire agreement on 17 June 2003 and "intensive back-door negotiations" beginning on 4 June in Akosombo, Ghana.

The Agreement called for the establishment of a post-war two-year transitional government (National Transitional Government of Liberia) which would consist of 76 members: 12 each from the three warring parties; 18 from political parties; seven from civil society and special interest groups; and one from each of Liberia's 15 counties. The warring parties, the opposition parties and civil society groups agreed to share ministerial portfolios and employment opportunities in the cabinet and parliament and elections were to be held no later than 2005.

The peace agreement covered a broad range of intended reforms; committing to a human rights inquiry through a truth commission, and vetting of the security forces on human rights grounds. Former Nigerian Head of State General Abdulsalami Abubakar facilitated the negotiations that led to the agreement. However, civil society played a strong role in the talks as well. Individuals representing inter-religious, human rights, pro-democracy, women's rights, and legal organisations were included as official delegates, and many others attended unofficially as observers. Women were especially vocal in these peace discussions. Everyday between 150 and 200 refugee women activists arrived at the hotel where the talks were taking place to advocate to stop the shelling of Monrovia and the violence in their country. These women were organized by the 'Women of Liberia Mass Action for Peace'.

== Timeline before signing of Agreement ==
- 4 August 2003 - 198 Nigerian commandos arrived in Monrovia aboard United Nations helicopters.
- 11 August 2003- Charles Taylor resigned and flew to Nigeria.
- 15 August 2003- 200 American Marines under Joint Task Force Liberia landed in Monrovia joining a marine platoon that had been protecting the U.S. Embassy over the previous month.
- 18 August 2003- Accra Comprehensive Peace Agreement is signed in Accra.

== Aftermath ==
Some fighting still continued following the signing of the Peace Agreement. In October. 2003 the UN Security Council authorized a Chapter VII mandate (allowing for intervention) and established the United Nations Mission in Liberia (UNMIL), which included the deployment of 15,000 peacekeepers.

On 14 October 2003 an interim government under Gyude Bryant was sworn into power and ruled until the 2005 national elections.

The Liberian general election of 2005 took place on 11 October 2005; a runoff election was held on 8 November 2005 which resulted in Ellen Johnson Sirleaf winning the presidency.
