= Maher Massacre =

Massacre of the Second Liberian Civil war

The Maher Massacre took place during the Second Liberian Civil War in Maher, Bomi County, on July 18, 2002.

== Incident ==
Details on the massacre differ across sources, but between 150 and "several hundred" people were killed and their bodies thrown into the Maher river.

Amnesty International reports that 175 people were killed in what they call the "Maher Bridge incident". According to this report the perpetrators were government troops suspected to be LURD (Liberians United for Reconciliation and Democracy, a rebel group active between 1999 and 2003) supporters

. The frightened population of Tubmanburg was lured onto pick-up trucks which ought to bring them to Monrovia, 100 km away, into safety and where food was available. Instead, the trucks stopped along the road after just 10 km, killed them and threw them into the river.

I just want the truth to come out – I want people to know what happened. I want them to know what happened on 18 July 2002. People need to know the truth because of the huge numbers of people who were killed at the Maher bridge. We are not talking about two or three people. People from the different parts of Liberia may not know about this but may have relatives who have died and they just don't know. Because in the war – people are scattered everywhere and those that are living in different areas won't know about this.

— M, survivor of the Maher Bridge

A number of witnesses to the massacre gave testimonies to the Liberian Truth and Reconciliation Commission (TRC). The TRC reacted with a recommendation for compensating the survivors but nothing was paid out as of October 2018.

During the trial of Liberian warlord Gibril Massaquoi, an anonymous soldier testified that Massaquoi was behind the killings, recalling:

After we captured Bomi, we put the civilians in a vehicle to carry them to a refugee camp, and when we reached to the Maher Bridge, Yeaten and his death squad soldiers including “Zigzer Massa”, and “Superman”, put all of the civilians down from the truck and they started killing the civilians and throwing their bodies into the water.

== Aftermath ==
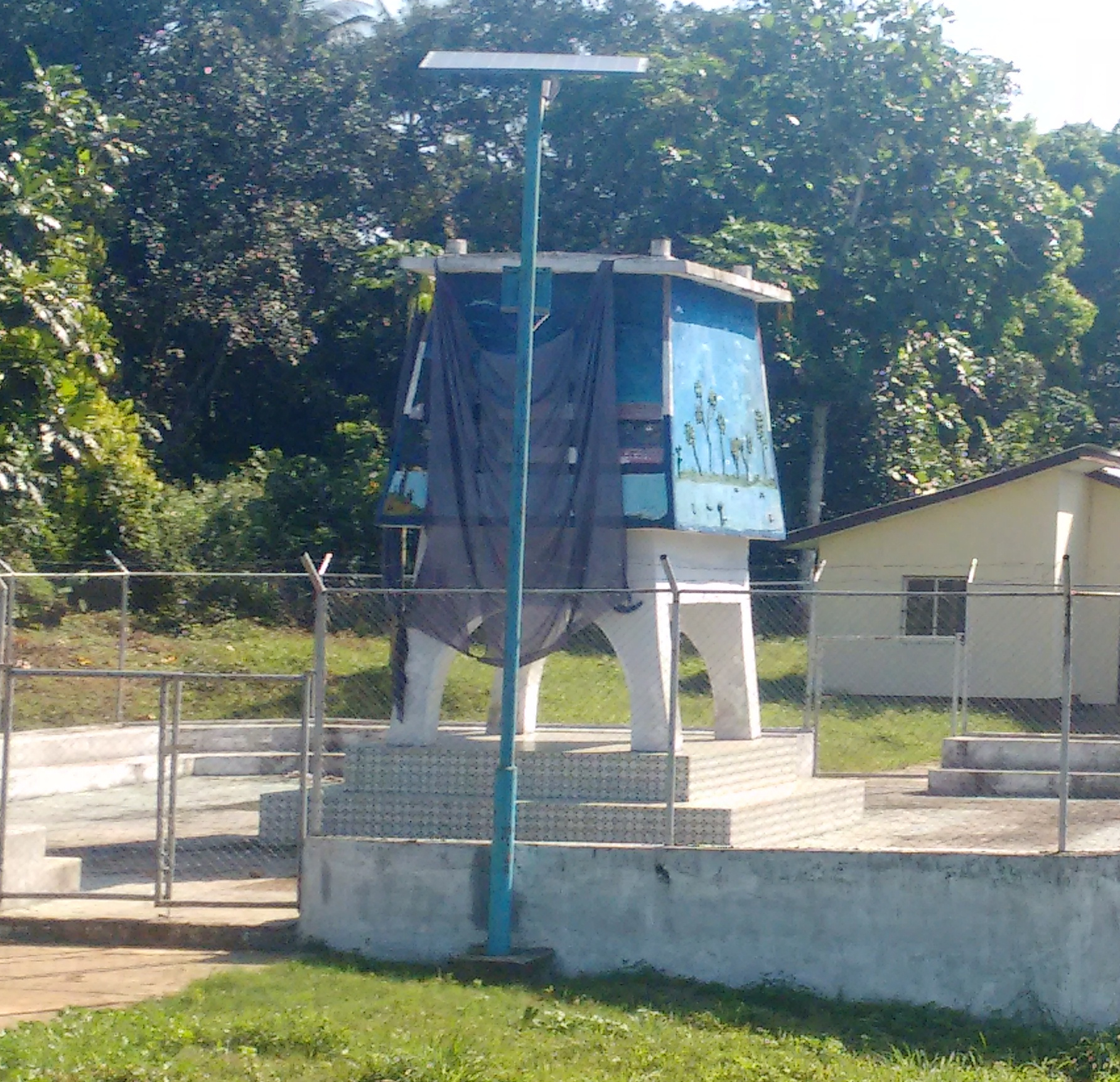
Maher Massacre Monument, photo from November 2019

A memorial next to the town North of the river reminds of the atrocities. Three sides of the monument depict the course of the events. The first scene shows a village of a few huts with an insinuated forest in the back- and a road in the foreground. On the road a camouflaged pickup is carrying many people; four perpetrators are attacking the villagers, two with machine guns, one with a machete. The second scene shows the Maher bridge where the attackers shoot at fleeing people and others are throwing them into the waters below. The third scene shows the river with five victims floating downstream.

This is one of 155 massacre and mass grave sites identified by the Independent National Commission on Human Rights (INCHR).

== In popular culture ==
The movie "Maher - Black Rain in Bomi" is based on the events.
