= Roddy Scott =

English combat photojournalist

- Born: 23 February 1971; Huntingdon, Cambridgeshire, England
- Died: 26 September 2002 (aged 31); Galashki, Ingushetia, Russia
- Occupation: Photojournalism
- Relatives: His great-great-great-uncle was C. P. Scott, editor and proprietor of The Manchester Guardian, while his grandfather Claude Scott wrote a farming column for The Daily Telegraph for 25 years.

Roddy Scott (23 February 1971 – 26 September 2002) was an English freelance photojournalist who documented neglected conflicts in such places as Sierra Leone, Yemen, Iraq, Afghanistan and Ethiopia. He derived the bulk of his income from updating The World's Most Dangerous Places and traveled widely in his freelance journalism career, usually without sponsors or payment.

He died in Russia while working for Britain's Frontline Television News.

== Career ==
Scott was a contributor to the annual guide, The World's Most Dangerous Places.

== Death ==
On 26 September 2002 Scott was killed in the Russian republic of Ingushetia. Russian soldiers found his body in Ingushetia's Galashki region, near the border with the war-torn republic of Chechnya, following a fierce battle between Russian forces and a group of Chechen rebel fighters in which at least 17 were killed and a Russian helicopter was shot down. Scott had accompanied the Chechens from Ruslan Gelayev's unit as they crossed from Georgia into Russia and was apparently killed by a bullet in the viewfinder of his camera while filming the firefight, United Press International reported. According to the Kavkaz Center, however, he was killed alone while trying to surrender. At first, the Kremlin officials said Scott might still be alive.

Scott was instrumental in updating Robert Young Pelton's The World's Most Dangerous Places' fourth edition and his primary source of income came from assisting Pelton in covering areas such as Kurdistan and Albania. Pelton investigated the circumstances of his friend's death and determined that Scott indeed tried to surrender but was shot in the face by a Russian sniper while waving an improvised white flag borrowed from a local. According to Pelton, the Russian government later tried to extort Scott's family, branding him as a "terrorist" and refusing to return the body or issue a death certificate unless money was paid. Pelton arranged with CNN's Moscow bureau Jill Dougherty to run a lengthy profile on Scott's career as a journalist to counter the Russian propaganda. Meanwhile, Scott's family solved the body extortion by simply demanding that in the British tradition, he should be buried where he fell.

Scott's father, Robin, writing to The Times, said his son had chosen to travel with the Chechens in order to remedy the sparse media reporting of a conflict: "Whether it was Kurds, Chechens, Afghans or Palestinians, he was committed to ensuring that issues were not sidelined and received the international attention that they deserved."

The Roddy Scott Foundation was named after him.
