= Lenzini =

Lenzini is a surname. Notable people with the surname include:

- John J. Lenzini Jr. (1947–1996), American horse trainer
- Luigi Lenzini (1881–1945), Italian Roman Catholic priest
- Martina Lenzini (born 1998), Italian footballer

== See also ==
- Lanzini
