= Maher: Black Rain in Bomi =

Maher: Black Rain in Bomi is a 2016 Liberian film based on the testimonies of survivors of a 2002 massacre in Bomi County. Directed by the video journalist Derick Snyder, it was shown at the Fighting Stigma Through Film festival in London in 2018.

The Maher massacre, one of the last massacres of the Second Liberian Civil War, took place in Tubmanburg on July 18, 2002. According to a 2004 investigation by the Catholic Justice and Peace Commission (JPC), pro-government militiamen under the command of Benjamin Yeaten and Roland Duo killed about 150 people on a bridge over the Maher River, about 60 km from Monrovia.

Snyder, a 2014 winner of the Mohamed Amin Africa Media Award for a documentary about Ebola, first heard about the Maher massacre in 2007. He self-funded Maher using money from the Mohamed Amin award. The film received a 2017 Award of Recognition from Indie Fest.
