= RFDG Insurgency =

Insurgency in Guinea

- Part of the spillover of the Second Liberian Civil War and the Sierra Leone Civil War
Date	2 September 2000 – 9 March 2001 (6 months, 2 weeks and 6 days)
Location	Guinea

Belligerents
Guinea: Young Volunteers; LURD	RFDG; Liberia; RUF; Supported by Burkina Faso

Commanders and leaders
	(Liberia) Charles Taylor (Liberia) Benjamin Yeaten (Liberia) Chucky Taylor; Sam Bockarie Unknown RFDG Commanders

Strength
Young Volunteers: 7,000–30,000	RFDG: 1,800–5,000

Casualties and losses
- 649 – 1,500 killed 100,000 – 350,000 displaced

The RFDG Insurgency was an insurgency in Guinea by the RFDG, a rebel group supported by Liberia and the Sierra Leonean rebel group RUF. The fighting was closely connected to the Second Liberian Civil War and the Sierra Leone Civil War and primarily occurred on Guinea's borders with Liberia and Sierra Leone. Beginning in September 2000, some of the most intense fighting took place around the city of Guéckédou in December, before the level of violence decreased in 2001.

== Background ==
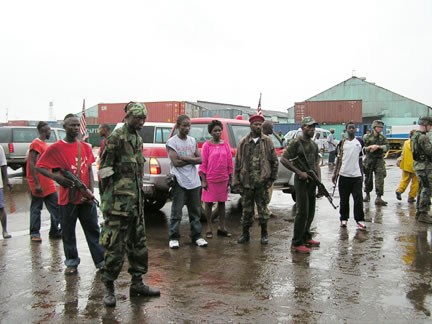
Guinea's support for LURD rebels (pictured) led to tense relations with Liberia

In 1999, Guinea had 450,000 refugees from the First Liberian Civil War and the Sierra Leone Civil War, the highest number in Africa at the time. Most of these refugees lived near the borders with Sierra Leone and Liberia. While this border region was initially peaceful, in the late 1990s the Sierra Leonean rebel group RUF began to conduct cross border raids into Guinea. The start of the Second Liberian Civil War in 1999 lead to an influx of more refugees and cross border raids from Liberian forces.

During the First Liberian Civil War, Guinea had supported the government of Samuel Doe, and had sent troops as part of an ECOMOG force, which clashed with the forces of the rebel leader Charles Taylor. When Taylor became the president of Liberia, Guinea supported the LURD rebel group, which it allowed to launch attacks on Liberia from Guinea. Thus, relations between the two countries were tense.

Guinea experienced two failed coup attempts in 1996 and 1998. With Liberian and RUF support and alleged weapons deliveries from Burkina Faso, Guinean officers who fled the country after the 1996 coup attempt formed the Rassemblement des Forces Démocratiques de Guinée (RFDG) in order to overthrow president Lansana Conté.

== Insurgency ==
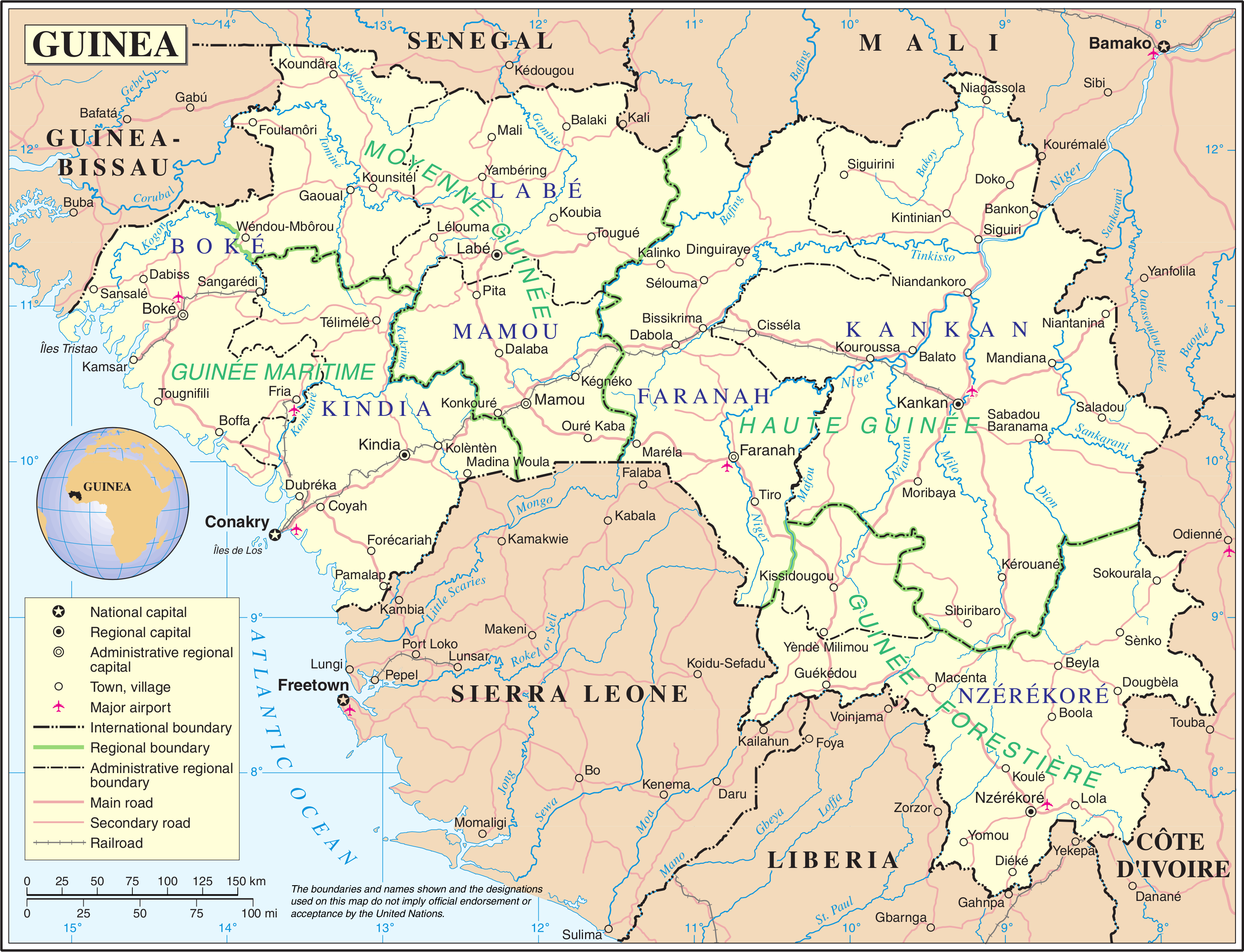
A map of Guinea. The fighting primarily took place near the borders with Liberia and Sierra Leone

The first attack was on September 2, 2000, at Massadou, on the border with Liberia. At least 40 people, including civilians, were killed. On September 4, Madina Woula, on the border with Sierra Leone, was attacked, causing the deaths of at least 40 people. On September 6, the RUF was allegedly involved in the temporary capture of Pamelap, the closest attack at the time to the capital, Conakry.

In response to the attacks, on September 9, president Lansana Conté gave a speech in which he said that there were rebels among the refugees and that the refugees should go home. In addition to the Guinean Army, LURD forces were mobilized to defend Macenta and Guéckédou. Young Guineans from the border areas were recruited into local militias called Young Volunteers.

On September 17, Macenta was attacked, and the head of the UNHCR office in the town was killed, along with other civilians. Macenta and Forécariah were attacked multiple times in September. In October and November the fighting was primarily in the Languette region, an area near Guéckédou that borders both Sierra Leone and Liberia.

At the start of the insurgency it was mostly unknown who was causing the attacks, but in mid-October the RFDG claimed responsibility. While there were also reports of rebels called the Union des Forces pour une Guinée Nouvelle (UFGN) and Union de Forces Démocratique de Guinée (UFDG), these were mostly like part of the RFDG.

On November 30, the rebels took control of towns near the city of Kissidougou which they managed to hold for about a week. Fighting also took place in the refugee camps around Kissidougou. On December 6, RUF fighters attacked Guéckédou from the south and east while RFDG and Liberian troops attacked from the west. The fighting in the town lasted for weeks and displaced 100,000 people. On March 9, 2001, rebels attacked the Nongoa area in the last significant attack in the insurgency, although isolated fighting was reported until 2002.

== Aftermath ==
The fighting greatly affected Guinea's large refugee population. Refugees were harassed, attacked, forcibly recruited, and displaced by the fighting. In addition, after the killing of the head of the UNHCR office in Macenta, UNHCR activities outside Conakry were suspended for months, leaving refugees without assistance. The fighting also displaced many Guineans. However, the insurgency did not manage to turn into a civil war that would have caused much more damage. In February 2002, a meeting between the presidents of Guinea, Liberia, and Sierra Leone in Rabat lead to a commitment to security along the countries' borders and to repatriate refugees.
