= United People's Party (Liberia) =

Political party in Liberia

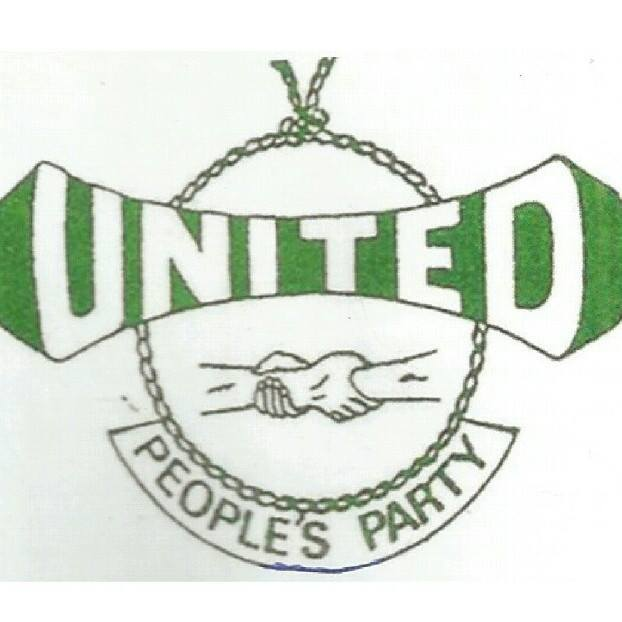
- Leader: MacDonald A. Wento
- Founded: 1980s
- Preceded by: PAL; PPP
- Ideology: African socialism
- Political position: Left-wing
- National affiliation: Coalition for Democratic Change

Website
- https://www.facebook.com/uppliberia/

The United People's Party (UPP) is a political party in Liberia. It formed in the 1980s as a successor to the Progressive Alliance of Liberia (PAL) and the Progressive People's Party (PPP), but was initially banned under President Samuel Doe because of its "socialist leanings".

PAL and UPP leader Gabriel Baccus Matthews was the main opposition politician in Liberia under Doe, and after Doe's death in 1990 he became Foreign Minister until 1993.

In the elections held on 19 July 1997, the UPP presidential candidate Gabriel Baccus Matthews won 2.51% of the vote. The party won 2 out of 64 seats in the House of Representatives and none in the Senate. While international observers deemed the polls administratively free and transparent, they noted that it had taken place in an atmosphere of intimidation because most voters believed that former rebel leader and National Patriotic Party (NPP) candidate Charles Taylor would return to war if defeated. Matthews retired as leader of the party in 1999.

Former senior PPP and UPP member Sekou Conneh became leader of the Liberians United for Reconciliation and Democracy (LURD) rebel group in 1999, which also included some former Doe supporters, and fought a civil war against Taylor until 2003. Conneh then ran as the 2005 presidential candidate of the Progressive Democratic Party (PRODEM).

In the 11 October 2005 elections, the United People's Party and the Liberian People's Party participated as part of the Alliance for Peace and Democracy (APD).

Both parties campaigned as part of the National Democratic Coalition in the 2011 presidential and legislative elections.

The party joined the Coalition for Democratic Change for the 2023 general election, running joint candidates for the parliament and supporting George Weah for the presidency.
