= Temple Fielding =

American travel writer (1913–1983)

Temple Hornaday Fielding (October 8, 1913 – May 18, 1983) was an American travel writer. His Fielding's Travel Guide to Europe, first published in 1948 and revised in regular editions thereafter, was the leading American guidebook to Europe in the decades after World War II and sold more than three million copies. The guides emphasized practical advice on hotels, restaurants, and shopping over sightseeing, an approach Fielding traced to a guidebook he had written for army recruits at Fort Bragg in 1941. From 1951 until his death he lived on Mallorca, where he ran the guide business with his wife, Nancy, and used the book's influence to press hotels, airlines, and tourist offices over their treatment of American visitors. Competitors such as Arthur Frommer criticized the guides' orientation toward costly hotels and restaurants.

== Early life and education ==
Fielding was born on October 8, 1913, (Note: The UPI obituary gives his date of birth as October 7, 1913;) in the Bronx, New York City. His father, George Fielding, was an electrical engineer. His maternal grandfather, William Temple Hornaday, director of the Bronx Zoo, lived with the family. Both Time and McPhee reported that he was descended, on his father's side, from the novelist Henry Fielding. The family later moved to Stamford, Connecticut. Fielding was the middle of three children. His younger brother, George T. Fielding III, known as Dodge, was a field artillery captain in the 43rd Infantry Division and was killed in action on Luzon in 1945.

Fielding left preparatory school in 1930 after failing his courses and worked as a salesman for several years before completing a year at Stamford High School and entering Princeton University, from which he graduated in 1939. After briefly selling mutual funds, he became a freelance writer, and sold his first article to Reader's Digest in 1940.

== Military service ==
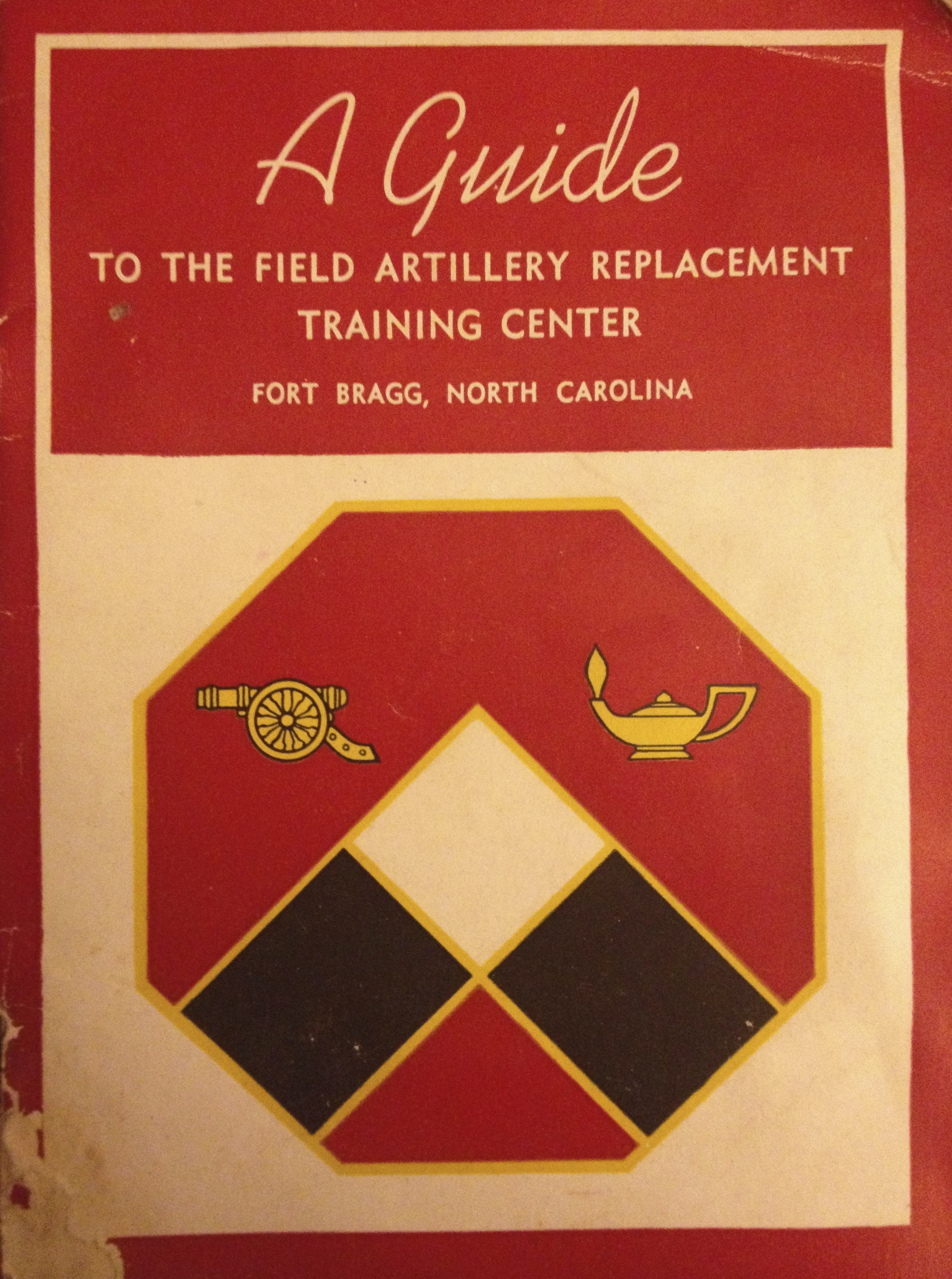
Fielding's guide to the Field Artillery Replacement Training Center at Fort Bragg (1941)

Fielding was called to active duty as a second lieutenant in early 1941 and posted to the Field Artillery Replacement Training Center at Fort Bragg, North Carolina, where his commanding officer assigned him to write a guidebook to the post. The resulting Guide to the Field Artillery Replacement Training Center, Fort Bragg, North Carolina was published in April 1941. Its informal, practical approach was later identified as the model for his European travel guides.

In early 1944, by then an artillery captain, Fielding transferred to the Office of Strategic Services (OSS), where he was trained in black propaganda and assigned to the Morale Operations Branch. He was based at the OSS field headquarters in Bari and carried out propaganda work in Italy, Algeria, and Yugoslavia, including clandestine trips to the Yugoslav mainland. In November 1944 he narrowly escaped capture on the Dalmatian coast. He was discharged as a major, with a citation crediting him with "more than 30,000 voluntary enemy surrenders".

== Fielding's Travel Guide to Europe ==
=== Origins ===
In 1946 Fielding traveled through Europe on magazine assignments and a commission to produce advertisements for Canadian Club whisky, and used the trip to collect material for a guidebook, having found existing guides impractical. He wrote the book over the following nine months, and his wife, Nancy, who was also his literary agent, sold it to William Sloane Associates. It was published in 1948 as Fielding's New Travel Guide to Europe. Time later described it as an instant success. Publishers Weekly has characterized its arrival as ending roughly a decade in which Fodor's guides had dominated the American market.

=== Approach and style ===
The guide was addressed to ordinary American tourists, whom Fielding personified as "Mr. and Mrs. John Smith", (Note: The name varied between editions. The 1955–56 edition described the Fieldings themselves as researching incognito as "Mr. and Mrs. Joe Smith, routine American tourists (which we are!)", wording repeated in the preface to the 1959–60 edition.) and whom he called "Guidesters", and concentrated on practical matters such as hotels, restaurants, shopping, nightlife, tipping, and avoiding being overcharged, with comparatively little coverage of culture or sightseeing. Fielding said he lacked the space to treat cultural attractions in detail, and that they mattered more to his critics than to his readers. The guide's brief passages on museums were generally written by Nancy Fielding.

Restaurants and nightclubs were inspected incognito where possible, with Fielding booking tables under assumed names. At hotels he identified himself to the management and asked to be shown rooms. The Fieldings spent several months of each year traveling. From the early 1960s they were assisted by Joseph and Judith Raff, who shared the inspection trips and much of the drafting. The guide also drew on a network of informants in each country and on letters from readers. It was written in the first person plural, in a punning, informal prose that Fielding called "Fielding-ese" and said he had modeled on the house style of Time. By 1969 the annual edition ran to 1,485 pages.

=== Popularity and influence ===
Two accounts describe the guide's reach among American visitors to Denmark in its early years. According to Time, a Danish government survey found that between one-third and one-half of Americans visiting between 1948 and 1950 had come on Fielding's recommendation, while McPhee reported that a poll commissioned by the Danish tourist chief found more than half of arriving American tourists carrying the guide. (Note: The two accounts differ in detail and may describe the same poll; neither cites a published survey, and McPhee's version is given in the course of Fielding's own recollections.) In 1950 the Danish government gave Fielding an award of honor. By 1958 Time was calling Fielding "the U.S. tourist's No. 1 travel guide", a standing that the historian Christopher Endy says he kept into the 1970s; Endy describes him as the figure most emblematic of the postwar boom in middle-class American travel to Europe. Time estimated in 1969 that each new edition sold more than 100,000 copies, and more than three million copies had been sold by the time of Fielding's death. The guide faced little competition until the 1960s, when budget guides aimed at younger travelers became competitive. Fielding's own budget title, Fielding's Super-Economy Guide to Europe (1967), sold 100,000 copies in its first month, but Arthur Frommer's Europe on $5 a Day outsold it by about two to one. Fielding was the subject of a Time cover story on June 6, 1969. The original cover portrait, by Birney Lettick, is now in the collection of the National Portrait Gallery. By 1969 Fielding had been sued repeatedly for libel and had settled out of court the single case he did not win, brought by a Brussels taxi company that he had described as crooks. (Note: Time gives 39 suits and a payment of $3,800; McPhee gives "nearly forty" and an out-of-court settlement of $3,500 plus legal fees. The two sources also quote the offending passage differently.) He was decorated by many governments—24, according to UPI—for his contribution to their tourist industries. Time listed three Spanish decorations, a Swedish royal order, and an Italian order of merit, and noted that he was an honorary citizen of Amsterdam.

McPhee wrote that tourist booms in Zermatt and Portugal's Algarve were traceable to Fielding's coverage. In 1964 the guide accused Zermatt of concealing a typhoid outbreak the previous year, a charge McPhee reported Fielding had spent $2,500 on Dutch investigators to verify before printing. The guide later restored its recommendation of the village.

Fielding used the guide to press complaints against businesses that he judged had mistreated its readers, and pursued them by letter and in person. McPhee reported that he had at his own expense hired private detectives to investigate suspected malpractice. His targets included hotel chains, tourist offices, shipping lines, and airlines. For several years the guide attacked Air France over its safety record and its crews' drinking. In 1964 the airline barred alcohol for flight and ground crews and wrote to Fielding acknowledging his campaign, and the 1967 edition restored its full recommendation. Time described a similar episode at Dublin's Gresham Hotel, which Fielding downgraded in 1962 after reader complaints and restored after the hotel had spent $850,000 on renovation.

That reputation could itself become an issue. In 1964 Paris Match, at a time when France was losing American visitors to Spain, ran a profile that called Fielding "a sort of supreme court judge with unlimited power" and singled out his warnings about French prices and road deaths, omitting the guide's generally favorable view of the country. The piece provoked heavy correspondence from readers on both sides and was raised in the French Senate, where a minister answered by reading out the guide's praise of France. Endy calls the episode the "Fielding Affair".

=== Politics and Spain ===
Although Fielding maintained that politics had no place in the book, the historian Neal Rosendorf has described the guide as "laced with political polemics", chiefly a strong anticommunism: the 1950 edition advised readers to wait before visiting Yugoslavia and treated Romania as all but closed. Franco's Spain was treated differently. In 1950 Fielding called the country "a political paradox", a rigid dictatorship over a people who did as they pleased, but by 1952 he was urging readers to go "without qualification or reservation" and promising that an ordinary American visitor would not be followed or questioned. The 1954–55 edition went further, defending the 1953 Madrid Pact and dismissing American opponents of Franco as naive. Fielding sent that chapter to the Spanish Ministry of Information and Tourism. Rosendorf found in the ministry's files that its tourism directorate thereafter went out of its way to help him on his annual visits, supplying an official as his driver, and that Fielding wrote to thank it for its cooperation. The Spanish chapter grew less political in later editions. Rosendorf counts Fielding, alongside American Express, TWA and Hilton, among the American commercial interests whose work made Spain a major destination for American tourists by the mid-1960s.

=== Critical reception ===
As early as 1958, Horace Sutton, the travel writer of the Saturday Review and himself a guidebook author, called Fielding "autocratic" in his advice to readers and by turns "savage" or "over-benevolent" in describing foreign places, preferring the essay-laden guides of earlier writers such as Sydney Clark and Clara Laughlin. Time described the Super-Economy Guide's attitude toward budget travel as patronizing, and Frommer criticized the Fielding guides' emphasis on expensive hotels and restaurants. Publishers Weekly later characterized the guide as somewhat more high-toned than Fodor's. Fielding acknowledged that the most frequent criticism of the guide was that it was aimed at snobbish readers, saying "possibly there is a great deal of justice in it". Endy writes that Fielding's aversion to cultural commentary and his fondness for stereotyped national portraits made him appear to some critics a symptom of the "unthinking oppressiveness of mass culture", while noting that similar charges had been leveled at guidebook writers since Karl Baedeker in the 1840s. Time's 1969 profile identified several factual errors and outdated entries in that year's edition, which it attributed in part to Fielding's reliance on local informants for cities his staff had been unable to revisit. Time also noted that shops listed in the companion shopping guide paid to be included, payments Fielding described as "production subsidies" too small to influence its content.

=== Fielding Publications and later history ===
By the late 1960s Fielding was his own publisher, and editions appeared under the Fielding Publications and William Morrow imprints. Later editions were titled simply Fielding's Europe. The imprint's other titles included a shopping guide, credited on early editions jointly to Temple and Nancy Fielding and on later ones to Nancy alone, for which she did the research, as well as a Caribbean guide and pocket currency and time converters, and, later, guides by his son, Dodge. Fielding also ran the Temple Fielding Epicure Club, whose members paid $15.50 for a set of cards that introduced them to about thirty leading European restaurants and entitled them to a preferential welcome and complimentary cocktails. (Note: Time gives 29 restaurants and describes the fee as annual. McPhee gives thirty cards for $15.50; Endy, "several dozen".) McPhee described the club as "selling prefabricated prestige". After a heart attack in August 1982, Fielding retired, and in early 1983 the Fieldings sold the rights to the guides to Morrow, remaining as consultants. The Raffs became co-directors of the series.

In 1993 Robert Young Pelton bought the Fielding's name from Morrow; his company, Fielding Worldwide, used it for a line of guides aimed at younger, independent travelers, including The World's Most Dangerous Places. The company was still operating in 1997, but by 2006 few Fielding titles remained in print.

== Personal life and death ==
While stationed at Fort Bragg, Fielding became a client of the Manhattan literary agent Nancy Parker, and they married two months later, in 1942. From 1950 she worked with him on the guides, doing much of the research. Their only child, Dodge Temple Fielding, also became a travel writer.

The Fieldings moved from New York to Denmark in 1951, to a house provided by the Danish government as part of its award, and four months later settled in Formentor, on Mallorca. Their estate there, Villa Fielding, also served as the headquarters of the guide business. Although he lived in Spain year-round from 1951, Fielding spoke only English. He told McPhee that he deliberately kept himself in the position of an American tourist unable to speak the local language. In 1982 they moved from Formentor to a penthouse in Palma de Mallorca. The Mallorcan town of Pollença made Fielding an adopted son.

Fielding had a heart attack in August 1982 and underwent two operations. He died of a heart attack at his home in Palma on May 18, 1983, at the age of 69. Because Spanish law did not permit the cremation he had wanted, he was buried in the town cemetery at Pollença.

== Selected works ==
- A Guide to the Field Artillery Replacement Training Center, Fort Bragg, North Carolina (1941)
- Fielding's Travel Guide to Europe (New York: William Sloane Associates, 1948–; later Fielding Publications and William Morrow), first published as Fielding's New Travel Guide to Europe and revised in regular editions – 1956 edition (registration required) via Internet Archive
- The Temple Fieldings' Selective Shopping Guide to Europe (with Nancy Fielding; 1961 and later editions; later editions credited to Nancy Fielding alone as Fielding's Selective Shopping Guide to Europe)
- Fielding's Super-Economy Guide to Europe (1967)
