= Sekou Conneh =

Liberian politician (born 1960)

Sekou Damate Conneh, Jr. (born 1960) is a Liberian politician and former rebel leader.

== Biography ==
Born in 1960 in the town of Gbarnga, Liberia (Bong County) to an ethnic Mandingo Muslim family, Conneh attended St. Martin's Cathedral School from 1966 to 1973. He attended William Tubman Methodist High School where he received his diploma in 1979.

He first became active in politics in 1980 when he joined the opposition Progressive People's Party; this was formed as one of the first legally recognized opposition parties in Liberia in more than 100 years. Ethnic indigenous groups in Liberia, who comprise some 95% of the population in the 21st century, had grown impatient with restrictions and lack of power under governments dominated by the True Whig Party, whose leaders were primarily Americo-Liberians, an ethnic group descended from African-American colonists of the early and mid-19th century.

Conneh had been a member of the Progressive Alliance of Liberia (PAL), the PPP's mother organization. He served as a senior party coordinator for the Kokoyah district in Bong County before fleeing to Uganda when the administration of President William Tolbert banned the PPP and arrested some of its leaders.

In 1985, after the Tolbert government was overthrown by Samuel Doe, Conneh returned to Liberia in a bid to contest the upcoming legislative election on the ticket of the United People's Party (UPP). The party was later banned by Doe's increasingly autocratic government, allegedly for possessing a 'foreign ideology'. In 1986, Conneh found employment in the Ministry of Finance, working as a revenue agent in Rivercess County. In 1988, he was transferred to Montserrado County, where he remained until the collapse of President Samuel Doe's regime in 1990 after a decade of rule.

During the period of civil war in the country, Conneh moved to Guinea. There he founded and served as the managing director of the Damate Corporation, an export and import business entity based in Conakry. The corporation's main activity involved the trading of second-hand cars imported from Europe. In his testimony to the Truth and Reconciliation Commission of Liberia he claims that he does not know French, the official language of Guinea.

After the civil war ended and elections were held, Conneh returned to Liberia to resume his former job as a revenue agent for the Ministry of Finance. Soon after, he quit and returned to car trading in Conakry. This time, Conneh began exporting second-hand cars purchased in Guinea to Liberia. Liberian intelligence officers accused him of smuggling, and he was arrested and moved to a prison cell in Monrovia. His wife, Aisha, appealed to Guinean president Lansana Conté to intervene and ask for Conneh's release. She was the daughter of Conte's soothsayer. With his release obtained, Conneh returned to Guinea.

In April 1999, several veteran opponents of President Charles Taylor formed a rebel movement known as Liberians United for Reconciliation and Democracy (LURD). LURD was to some extent a successor to United Liberation Movement of Liberia for Democracy (ULIMO). Based on a power sharing agreement between Krahn and Mandingo united around a single maxim: Taylor must go. Conneh was appointed chairman of LURD, because of his wife's high-level contacts with the Guinean government. Civil war resumed in Liberia in 1999 after clashes between LURD rebels and government forces.

Following the departure of Charles Taylor under international pressure and the setting up of a broad-based transitional government, which represented multiple ethnic groups and political parties, LURD and other rebel groups finally disbanded.

Conneh's supporters founded the Progressive Democratic Party (PRODEM) in preparation for upcoming elections, scheduled for 11 October 2005. Conneh was nominated as the party's presidential candidate, but received only 0.56% of the vote in the election that brought Ellen Sirleaf to power as president.

Testifying before the Truth and Reconciliation Commission on August 28, 2008, Conneh said that, during the war, Sierra Leone and Guinea had allowed the LURD rebels free passage "through their borders with our arms without any questions from them".
