= Progressive Alliance of Liberia =

Political party in Liberia

The Progressive Alliance of Liberia (PAL) was an opposition political movement formed in 1975 in Liberia led by group of Liberians from the United States and local students. The Political Education Team of the organization was organized, prepared, and awarded certificates by and under the signature of the founding Chairman of PAL, Gabriel Baccus Matthews. Members of the Political Education Team of six young Liberian students were:

- Nathaniel O. Beh
- Thomas Z. Deyagbo
- Michael C.G. George
- Saywalah Kesselly
- Jesus Swaray

The sixth member has never been identified.

This Monrovia-based organization, PAL, at the time was responsible for the door-to-door campaign, and organizing opened meetings in the nation on the voluntary basis, for the organization’s political awareness programs in boroughs including, New Kru Towns, Bozy’s Quarter, Slipway, Westpoints, Airfield, Lakpahsu Sinkor and as well as other areas within the entire Monrovia metropolitans. The organization also had a general coordinator in the metro areas, D. Kahn Carlor. The Progressive Alliance Of Liberia was not a political party as mentioned in some quarters; rather, it was the founding organization of the Progressive People’s Party (PPP) that gave birth to the fierce and aggressive opposition movement in Liberia against the dangerous grand old True Whig Party, in Liberian politics. Prior to PAL and, subsequently, the PPP the True Whig Party had eliminated many members of the opposition members through false accusations of sedition that in most cases, gradually led to their deaths or imprisonment with regular torture.

The PAL was not a Marxist organization, and had no desire to be one. The organization used provisions and articles in the Constitution of the Republic of Liberia in all of its activities of formulation of local branches in other parts of the country. It had its Secretary General, Mr.Oscar J. Quah, in Nimba County, organizing similarly as were done in the boroughs of Monrovia. Mr. Quah frequently visited the Central Monrovia Office even while he believed the processes of mobilization for PAL would be more secured from the hinterland of the Republic. Unlike Chairman Matthews, who believed Monrovia would be a better and aggressive starting point for the initiative, Secretary General Quah’s point was well understood since indeed, the GOP (the True Whig Party) at the time, would not tolerate opposition members, had not done so in the past, and was not indicating that it would.

Opposition parties that did not agree with the True Whigs or its philosophies and practices (especially those that did not believe in the "so says one, so say all" concepts and the massive corruption in governance to add, were considered enemies of the Republic, falsely accused of sedition, arrested and imprisoned.

== Rice Riots ==
In early April 1979, the Liberian Minister of Agriculture, Florence Chenoweth, proposed an increase in the subsidized price of rice from $22 per 100-pound bag to $26. Chenoweth asserted that the increase would serve as an added inducement for rice farmers to stay on the land and produce rice as both a subsistence crop and a cash crop, instead of abandoning their farms for jobs in the cities or on the rubber plantations. However, political opponents criticized the proposal as self-aggrandizement, pointing out that Chenoweth and the family of President William Tolbert operated large rice farms and would therefore realize a tidy profit from the proposed price increase.

The Progressive Alliance of Liberia called for a peaceful demonstration in Monrovia to protest the proposed price increase. On April 14, 1979, about 2,000 activists began what was planned as a peaceful march on the Executive Mansion. The protest march swelled dramatically when the protesters were joined en route by more than 10,000 "back street boys," causing the march to quickly degenerate into a disorderly mob of riot and destruction. Widespread looting of retail stores and rice warehouses ensued with damage to private property estimated to have exceeded $40 million. The government called in troops to reinforce police units in the capital, who were overwhelmed by the sheer numbers of the rioters. In 12 hours of violence in the city's streets, at least 40 civilians were killed, and more than 500 were injured. In 2008, former General Coordinator of the People's Redemption Council, D. Kaine Carlo testified before the Liberian Truth and Reconciliation Commission that the around 300 members of the PAL alone were killed in the crackdown. Hundreds more were arrested.

== Aftermath ==
Tolbert's credibility was severely damaged by the Rice Riots. In January 1980, Tolbert permitted the Progressive Alliance of Liberia to become the officially registered Progressive People's Party (PPP). Tolbert was assassinated and his government overthrown on April 12, 1980 in a military coup led by Master Sergeant Samuel Doe, almost a year to the day after the rioting. Sergeant Doe ordered the release of about 50 leaders of the PPP who had been jailed. He appointed Gabriel Baccus Matthews as Minister of Foreign Affairs and Chea Cheapoo as Attorney General. By 1981, however, the PPP had fallen out of favour with Doe, who became increasingly dictatorial. The banned PPP was reorganised as the United People's Party (UPP). During the 1980s, Baccus Matthews had the role as the main opposition politician in Liberia. In 1990 under Amos Sawyer as Interim President after Doe's death, he was again appointed as Foreign Minister.

Both Matthews (for the United People's Party) and Cheapoo (for a reconstituted Progressive People's Party) contested the 1997 presidential election. Former PAL/PPP and UPP member Sekou Conneh became leader of the Liberians United for Reconciliation and Democracy (LURD) rebel group in 1999, which also included some former Doe supporters, and fought a civil war against Taylor until 2003. Conneh ran as the candidate of the Progressive Democratic Party (PRODEM) in the 2005 presidential election.
