= Benjamin Yeaten =

Liberian militia leader (born 1969)

- Born: 28 February 1969 (age 57); Tiaplay, Nimba County, Liberia
- Military career
- Allegiance: NPFL (1987–2003); Liberia (1997–2003)
- Branch: Armed Forces of Liberia (1997–2003)
- Service years: 1987–present
- Rank: Lieutenant general
- Nickname: "50"
- Commands: Special Security Service (SSS); Special Operations Division; Anti-Terrorist Unit (ATU); Armed Forces of Liberia
- Conflicts: First Liberian Civil War; Sierra Leone Civil War; 1998 Monrovia clashes Second Liberian Civil War; First Ivorian Civil War; Second Ivorian Civil War; 2016–2017 Gambian constitutional crisis

Benjamin Yeaten (born 28 February 1969), widely known by his old radio call sign "50", is a Liberian mercenary and former military officer, who served as the Armed Forces of Liberia's deputy commander and director of the Special Security Service (SSS) during the presidency of Charles Taylor. Notorious for committing several war crimes, Yeaten was one of Taylor's most trusted and loyal followers. He rose to the de facto leader of all of Taylor's armed forces and the second most powerful figure in the government during the Second Liberian Civil War. After the fall of Taylor's regime, he managed to flee his home country, and since then operates covertly in West Africa as commander, recruiter, and military adviser for hire.

== Biography ==
=== Service under Charles Taylor ===
==== Early life and rise in ranks ====
While Chucky was Taylor's blood and flesh, Yeaten had known Taylor longer - he was a child of the NPFL, coming of age at Tajura and following the revolution into adulthood.

— Johnny Dwyer about Benjamin Yeaten's early life and relationship with Charles Taylor.

Benjamin Yeaten was born on 28 February 1969 in Tiaplay, Nimba County, Liberia, which was one of the areas in Liberia that suffered the most under Samuel Doe's regime. As result, Yeaten joined the rebel army that Charles Taylor was building in exile in Tajura, Libya. At the time of his enlistment, he was 14 or 15 and one of the youngest recruits in the new force. Displaying determination, bravery and loyalty during the guerilla training at Tajura, Yeaten impressed Taylor himself.

With his rebel force officially consolidated as the National Patriotic Front of Liberia (NPFL), Taylor launched his insurgency against Doe's government in 1989, starting the First Liberian Civil War. Yeaten also took part in the civil war, and quickly rose through the ranks in the NPFL. Yeaten became close to his leader, viewing him as "father figure". In turn, Taylor trusted him, and Yeaten was described as "Taylor's surrogate son in the rebel hierarchy" at the time. In course of the first civil war, Yeaten also earned his feared and brutal reputation. The men under his command committed numerous massacres, such as the one at Carter Camp in 1993, where over 600 civilians were murdered.

==== Peacetime 1997–99 ====
When Taylor won the civil war and became President of Liberia in 1997, Yeaten came to hold the most important security positions in the new government. He was appointed head of the Special Security Service (SSS, also known as "ninjas"), which served as presidential guard, and the Special Operations Division. Under his command, the SSS quickly became infamous for its brutality and abuses, while Yeaten came to serve as Taylor's hitman. He carried out numerous political murders, with one of the most notorious cases occurring shortly after the Liberian general election, 1997: On 3 December 1997, Samuel Dokie, one of Taylor's political rivals, was detained alongside his family in Nimba County. On the following day, Yeaten and his men arrived, took them into custody, and transported them to an undisclosed location. The whole family was subsequently brutally murdered, and when their corpses were found, the bodies were so extremely mutilated that only Samuel Dokie's head was still identifiable. Although Dokie's death was a scandal with much publicity, which prompted President Taylor to deny any involvement in the killings and order an investigation, Yeaten was never prosecuted and kept his job. The U.S. embassy at the time simply noted that Yeaten was one of the "known human rights abusers" in Liberia. Despite his power in the government, Yeaten still faced a rival in the form of Taylor's son Charles McArther Emmanuel, better known as "Chuckie". Chuckie led the Anti-Terrorist Unit (ATU) which was effectively in competition for resources with Yeaten's units. Though the two vied for influence and President Taylor's attention, Yeaten was generally more powerful and much more feared than Chuckie.

When President Taylor began to support the Revolutionary United Front (RUF) during the Sierra Leone Civil War, Yeaten became involved in supplying arms and ammunition to these rebels. Independently from Taylor, Yeaten developed a close friendship with RUF commander Sam Bockarie in 1998, and consequently often communicated with him without authorization.

==== Second Liberian Civil War ====
After the outbreak of the Second Liberian Civil War in 1999, Yeaten further rose in prominence, and he was appointed lieutenant general, becoming both the most senior general as well as deputy commander of the armed forces. In the war's first year, he commanded a mixed force of Liberian soldiers and Sierran Leonean RUF fighters at Voinjama and Foya, battling local insurgents. When the latter managed to capture Voinjama, Yeaten launched a number of counter-attacks, eventually retaking the town. To his annoyance, the RUF fighters then started to loot the area and harass civilians. Yeaten ordered them to leave Voinjama, telling them that "here you are not rebels. You’re fighting for the government. You’re not rebels here."

By early 2000, Yeaten had triumphed in his rivalry with Chuckie, who had proven to be completely incapable as ATU commander. As result, President Taylor made Yeaten the de facto leader of the ATU, filling its ranks with Yeaten's followers. Along with the ATU, Yeaten became involved in the First Ivorian Civil War while the fighting in Liberia was still ongoing. His troops supported the Ivorian New Forces in western Ivory Coast, and were responsible for widespread looting and many civilian deaths in Danané. By 2002, however, the situation of the Liberian government was deteriorating. Taylor responded by putting Yeaten effectively in charge of the whole war effort. While he was considered a capable commander, who inspired both fear as well as respect among his troops, Yeaten could not stop the collapse of Taylor's regime. A major and successful government counter-offensive in northern Liberia that recaptured Tubmanburg proved inconsequential, while the rebels were gaining strength.

Lieutenant General Yeaten's conduct of war was however noted for its ruthlessness, brutality, and numerous war crimes: He mass recruited child soldiers, raped women, ordered the massacre of civilians, tortured presumed enemies, and forced captured rebels to fight each other to the death. As defeat became increasingly likely, Taylor began to distrust the Sierran Leoneans among his forces (including the RUF) and fear them as political liabilities. Eventually, the president decided to have them killed - a task he entrusted to Yeaten. The lieutenant general thus became involved in a plot to murder the RUF leader Sam Bockarie despite his past friendship with the Sierra Leonean rebel. Yeaten lured Bockarie into the jungle of Nimba County under the guise of a "special mission". Although Bockarie already suspected that something was amiss at the time, he went along with Yeaten. In course of the trip into the jungle, their convoy repeatedly stopped, and one after another Bockarie's bodyguards were ordered to leave their cars, taken away, and executed. As the group reached the place where Bockarie himself was supposed to be executed, the rebel leader managed to escape. In the end, however, Yeaten and his men tricked Bockarie into revealing himself, whereupon they beat him to death. They then raped and killed Bockarie's wife and executed his son and mother. Yeaten and the SSS were also responsible for the murder of John W. Yormie, Deputy Minister of National Security, and Isaac Vaye, Deputy Minister for Technical Service at the Public Works, in June 2003.

In July 2003, the war finally turned decisively against the government loyalists. Yeaten's forces were overrun by LURD rebels, who proceeded to lay siege to Monrovia. The lieutenant general consequently personally commanded the government forces during the siege. By this time, he had become the second most powerful individual in the government, more so than Vice President Moses Blah. When Taylor travelled to Ghana in order to take part in peace talks with the rebels, it seemed possible that Taylor might be arrested by Ghanaian authorities. This came not to pass, however, mostly due to Yeaten threatening to execute Ghanaians who resided in Liberia in the case of Taylor's detention.

As it became clear to Taylor that he had lost the war and agreed to resign from office in August 2003, Yeaten still commanded the remaining government forces in Monravia. Despite the implementation of a ceasefire, Yeaten personally threatened to renew hostilities in the case that the rebels failed to withdraw from the city's port. In the end, however, the government forces laid down arms. Yeaten consequently decided to go into exile, fearing possible reprisals. Shortly before fleeing the country, he murdered his fiancée, who was only known as "Babygirl", and disposed of her body.

=== In exile ===
After escaping from Liberia, Yeaten went into hiding somewhere in West Africa, hunted by the US Federal Bureau of Investigation for war crimes and crimes against humanity. He subsequently became active as mercenary. Expert Robert Tynes commented that Yeaten's choice of work was not surprising, as "armed conflict is his world", and fighting is "what he was taught to do since boyhood". He went on to work for Faure Gnassingbé, President of Togo, and Yahya Jammeh, President of the Gambia, from whom he hope to gain protection in return for training their elite forces. He is supposed to have trained the Togolese presidential bodyguards "on guerrilla tactics and other warfare maneuvers". According to the Special Court for Sierra Leone's chief investigator, Yeaten eventually agreed to cooperate with the court, but was barred from leaving his exile in Togo by local officials. In January 2009, Liberia's Ministry of Justice officially ordered Yeaten's arrest on charges of murder, and asked Interpol to assist them in searching for him. Interpol consequently issued a red notice for Yeaten. Otherwise, however, the Liberian government did little to actually arrest and prosecute him.

In course of the Second Ivorian Civil War in 2010/11, Yeaten reportedly fought alongside the New Forces rebels, with whom he had already cooperated almost ten years earlier. He was responsible for recruiting Liberian fighters to bolster their ranks. Conversely, other sources claimed that he was in southeastern Ivory Coast by January 2011, and intended to join President Laurent Gbagbo's forces against the New Forces. Following the Second Ivorian Civil War, Yeaten was rumored to have a small private army under his command stationed at the Liberian-Ivorian border. Some Monrovian newspapers even claimed in 2015 that he was secretly building a guerrilla army in the forests, while planning an uprising against the new Liberian government.

In 2016, Yeaten lived in Lomé, Togo, and although he allegedly was still protected by Gnassingbé, the Togolese President came under increasing international pressure to extradite Yeaten so that he could be prosecuted in Liberia. Meanwhile, Yeaten began to covertly form a unit of over 200 mercenaries in Liberia, recruited from NPFL and ULIMO ex-fighters. With this unit he resurfaced in December 2016 in the Gambia, reportedly hired by President Jammeh to protect him in case of an invasion of ECOWAS to depose him. In the end, the crisis ended peacefully; it is assumed that Yeaten consequently returned to Togo.
