= Gabriel Baccus Matthews =

Liberian politician (1948 – 2007)

Gabriel Bacchus Matthews (1948 – September 7, 2007) was a Liberian politician. He is considered one of the leaders in developing a multi-party system in Liberia, long dominated by the True Whig Party. He founded the Progressive Alliance of Liberia (PAL) in 1975, the first active opposition party since the demise of the Republican Party in the 1870s.

It was succeeded by the Progressive People Party (PPP) and later the United People's Party. Matthews twice served as Minister of Foreign Affairs of Liberia, under Samuel K. Doe (1980–1981) and later under Amos Sawyer (1990–93).

== Biography ==
As a young man, Matthews joined the dissident movement against President William R. Tolbert. He worked to create an opposition party, as the True Whig Party had been in power for more than 100 years. In 1975 he and many among the Liberian diaspora formed the Progressive Alliance of Liberia (PAL), the first legal opposition party to be recognized in decades.

After the April 1980 coup in which Tolbert was overthrown and Samuel K. Doe came to power, Matthews was appointed Minister of Foreign Affairs for the first time. Matthews served as Foreign Minister until 1981. He later fell out of favor with Doe, he had his own personal desires to become Head of State and felt superior to Doe and the other PRC members.

Matthews achieved reorganization of the party as the Progressive People's Party (PPP) and legal recognition.

It reorganized again as United People's Party (UPP). During the 1980s, Matthews was the main opposition politician in Liberia. Roland Trobeh described him as the father of multi-party democracy in the nation.

After Doe's death, in 1990, Matthews again was appointed Foreign Minister, serving under President Amos Sawyer. He was instrumental in bringing the ECOMOG Peacekeeping force to Liberia. He remained foreign minister until 1993, when he was replaced in a cabinet reshuffle.

At the end of the civil war, Matthews stood unsuccessfully as the candidate of the United People's Party in the 1997 presidential election.

In 2005, Matthews announced his support for George Weah in the 2005 presidential election.

He taught many youths how to stage non-political advocacy using his practical experience generated from social, political engagement of social institutions. Some of his students were: Frank Awode, Liberia's Child Rights advocate, Trokon Monghah, and the list goes on.

Knowing that he was ill, and rejected by some politicians, Matthews told his wife, then in the United States, to ask Monsignor Father Robert Tikpor of the Catholic Church to give his eulogy. Matthews had been barred from his home Providence Baptist Church since opposing President Tolbert. He died on September 7, 2007, after a brief illness.
