= Edward Porta =

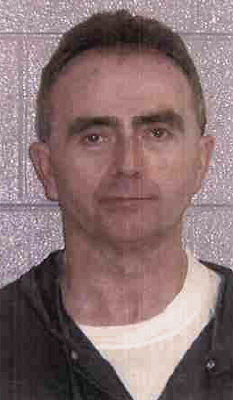
- Porta's mug shot from federal arrest warrant.
- Born: November 13, 1954 (age 71); Argentina
- Occupation: Textile trader
- Height: 6 ft 0 in (1.83 m)
- Criminal charges: Conspiracy to defraud, escape
- Criminal penalty: 38 months at the U.S. Penitentiary in Lee County, Virginia
- Criminal status: Released
- Children: 2

Edward Porta (born November 13, 1954) is an Argentinian former textile trader who was based in the area of Spartanburg, South Carolina. He pleaded guilty to a federal charge of conspiracy to defraud the U.S. Department of Agriculture of more than $400,000. In February 2008, Porta escaped from the minimum security camp at the U.S. Penitentiary in Lee County, Virginia and was profiled on America's Most Wanted.

== Background ==
Porta was married and divorced four times, and has two children. He has five siblings who he claims he did not have contact with for 40 years, according to police.

=== Textile business ===
Porta began his career working for his father's textile business. Police stated that he plotted to take advantage of federal programs such as the Export Credit Guarantee Program, intended by the U.S. Department of Agriculture to assist small U.S. and foreign exporters of cotton to compete against large corporations. As president of Porta Textiles and Porta Technologies, he acted as both the importer and the exporter, according to the police. Along with money he defrauded from the government, police said that Porta also swindled banks and other businesses of over $2 million. After his arrest, Porta said that he moved around various parts of the United States and Latin America during his life.

== Incarceration, escape and recapture ==
Porta pleaded guilty on December 20, 2005 to the charge of conspiracy to defraud the U.S. Department of Agriculture in the U.S. District Court for the Western District of North Carolina. On May 2, 2007, the court in Asheville, North Carolina sentenced Porta to 38 months at the U.S. Penitentiary in Lee County, Virginia. He was ordered to pay $2.9 million restitution.

Porta was assigned federal inmate register number 18862-058. Authorities believe Porta had walked away from the minimum security camp at the penitentiary when he turned up missing during a 4 p.m. count on February 25, 2008. He had been placed in the low security area and was given a significant amount of freedom because he had been convicted of a business-related white-collar crime. He was scheduled to have been released on April 15, 2010. Porta was profiled on America's Most Wanted.

Porta was captured on May 28, 2016 at a motel near Seattle Tacoma International Airport after being featured on 'Washington's Most Wanted'.

Porta served the remainder of his sentence at a corrections facility in Russell County, Virginia. He was released on October 1, 2019.
