= Siege of Monrovia =

2003 battle during the Second Liberian Civil War

- Part of the Second Liberian Civil War
Date	July 18 – August 14, 2003
Location	Monrovia
Result	Rebel victory: Charles G. Taylor resigns, peacekeepers arrive and rebels lift the siege

Belligerents
(Liberia) Loyalist Armed Forces elements	Anti-Taylor Armed Forces elements (Liberia) LURD rebels

Commanders and leaders
(Liberia) Charles G. Taylor (Liberia) Benjamin Yeaten	(Liberia) Gyude Bryant

Casualties and losses
1,500 killed	2,500 killed
- 1,000 civilians killed

The siege of Monrovia or Fourth Battle of Monrovia, which occurred in Monrovia, Liberia between July 18 and August 14, 2003, was a major military confrontation between the Armed Forces of Liberia and Liberians United for Reconciliation and Democracy (LURD) rebels during the Second Liberian Civil War. The shelling of the city resulted in the deaths of around 1,000 civilians.

Thousands of people were displaced from their homes as a result of the conflict. By mid-August, after a two-month siege, Liberian president Charles Taylor went into exile and peacekeepers arrived as a result of the siege.

== Background ==
In early 2003 the Movement for Democracy in Liberia (MODEL) rebel group emerged in southern Liberia. By the summer of 2003, Taylor's government controlled only a third of the country. Despite some setbacks, LURD rebels controlled the northern third of the country and was threatening the capital by mid-2003.

== The siege ==
The LURD military assault against Monrovia began July 19, 2003, shelling the city heavily during its advance. Some shells struck the American embassy to Liberia, killing over 30 refugees residing there and injuring many embassy staff. Initial assaults came from the north, and then the east, of Monrovia. By July 21, the rebels were known to have been in control of the seaport, while the government held the airport. On August 14, 2003, rebel forces lifted their siege of Monrovia and 200 United States Marines landed in the country to support a West African peace force.

== Women of Liberia Mass Action for Peace ==
During the siege, the Christian and Muslim women of Monrovia joined forces to create a peace movement called the Women of Liberia Mass Action for Peace. Thousands of women mobilized their efforts, staged silent nonviolence protests and forced a meeting with President Charles Taylor and extracted a promise from him to attend peace talks in Ghana. The women of Liberia became a political force against violence and against the government.

Their actions brought about an agreement during the stalled peace talks. As a result, the women were able to achieve peace in Liberia after a 14-year civil war and later helped bring to power the country's first female head of state, Ellen Johnson Sirleaf. The story is told in the 2008 documentary film Pray the Devil Back to Hell.

== See also ==
- Pray the Devil Back to Hell
