= United States Penitentiary, Lee =

US high-security federal prison in Virginia

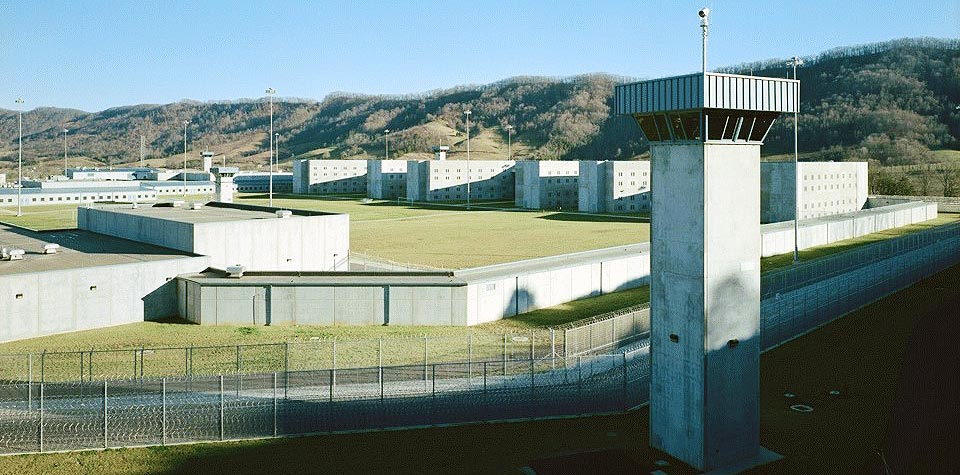
- Interactive map of United States Penitentiary, Lee
- Location: Lee County, near Pennington Gap, Virginia; 36°42′10.7″N 83°0′5.8″W
- Status: Operational
- Security class: High security (with satellite minimum-security prison camp)
- Population: 1,528 [1,482 at the USP, 46 in prison camp] (September 2023)
- Opened: 2002
- Managed by: Federal Bureau of Prisons

The United States Penitentiary, Lee (USP Lee) is a high-security United States federal prison for male inmates in Virginia. It is operated by the Federal Bureau of Prisons, a division of the United States Department of Justice. The facility also has an adjacent satellite prison camp which houses minimum-security male offenders.

USP Lee is located in the Lee County Industrial Park, an unincorporated area in Lee County, Virginia, in the southwestern part of the state. The prison is located off of U.S. Route 58 at the intersection of Route 638, near Pennington Gap and 8 miles (13 km) east of Jonesville.

== History ==
The annual per capita income of Lee County was $12,917 in the early 1990s, making the Virginia area a prime candidate to host a federal prison and bring money into the community.

Architectural and construction work of the 635,097-square-foot (59,000 m^{2}) facility was administered by Hayes, Seay, Mattern & Mattern, now known as AECOM. Computer modeling was utilized to identify and minimize blindspots of prison watchtowers. Construction began in the summer of 1998 on a budget of $102 million. The penitentiary was completed in August 2001 and began receiving inmates in 2002. According to project manager Gary Carsten of the Federal Bureau of Prisons, the main recurring problem of the facility is the excessive strain on Lee County's sewage system.

Archaeological discoveries on the prison property include arrowheads and pottery from a Native American gravesite believed to be associated with an ancient hospital dating as far back as 10,000 years.

== Notable incidents ==
On February 25, 2008, inmate Edward Porta was noted to be missing during a 4 p.m. count after apparently walking away from the minimum security camp. Porta defrauded the U.S. Department of Agriculture of more than $400,000. He remained a fugitive for over eight years until he was recaptured in May 2016, and was profiled on the television program America's Most Wanted.

There have been incidents of violence at USP Lee and several homicides. Inmate Quinten Corniel was killed on September 30, 2008, and inmate Ernest Bennett died on January 22, 2010, both during altercations with other inmates. On April 29, 2010, Filikisi Hafoka, a member of the Tongan Crip Gang, was taken off life support after being stabbed on the previous weekend. As is procedure, USP Lee went into lockdown after these incidents and investigations were conducted. The killers of Corniel and Bennett were subsequently convicted of murder and sentenced to life in prison.

== Notable inmates (current and former) ==
=== Organized crime ===
Inmate Name	Register Number	Status	Details
Genaro García Luna	59745-177	Now at ADX Florence serving a 38-year sentence. Scheduled for release in 2052.	Former Mexican Secretary of Public Security under the presidency of Felipe Calderon; arrested in 2019 and convicted in 2023 for accepting millions of dollars' worth of bribes from the Sinaloa Cartel in exchange for protecting drug shipments coming into the United States. He is the highest-ranking official Mexican official ever to be convicted in the United States.
Dandeny Muñoz Mosquera	37459-053	Serving a life sentence and is now at USP Atwater.	Assassin for the now-defunct Medellin Drug Cartel in Colombia; convicted in 1994 of blowing up an Avianca jetliner over Bogota in 1989, killing all 107 people aboard, including two US citizens, in one of the deadliest acts of drug-trade terrorism in history.
Wilson Pagan	88356-054	Serving a life sentence at USP Hazelton.	Former leader of the Latin Kings.
Anthony “Harv” Ellison	86282-054	Serving a 24-year sentence, scheduled for release in 2042. Now at USP Canaan.	Member of the Nine Trey Gangsters, orchestrated the kidnapping and robbery of rapper 6ix9ine in 2018.
Gerardo Castillo-Chavez	65736-279	Now at USP Atwater serving a life sentence.	Hitman for Los Zetas, the armed wing of the Gulf Cartel in Mexico; convicted in 2012 of racketeering, drug trafficking conspiracy and weapons charges for committing crimes on the cartel's behalf including kidnapping, assault and murder.
Benjamin Arellano Felix	00678-748	Transferred to FCI Atlanta Serving a 25-year sentence; scheduled for release 28 April 2032.	Former leader of the Tijuana Cartel in Mexico, pleaded guilty in 2013 to conspiracy and money laundering for directing the importation of thousands of tons of cocaine into the US; the cartel killed over 1,000 civilians and police officers over a 16-year period.

=== Other crimes ===
Inmate Name	Register Number	Status	Details
Brian Patrick Regan	41051-083	Now at FCI Terre Haute serving a life sentence.	Former intelligence analyst for the US Air Force charged with attempted espionage and gathering secret information for attempting to sell satellite technology and other classified material to Iraq and China for $13 million.
Jose Ramirez-Dorantes	23196-298	Serving a 55-year sentence; scheduled for release in 2057.	Pleaded guilty in 2013 to murdering a federal official in connection with the robbery and fatal shooting of U.S. Border Patrol Agent Robert W. Rosas, Jr. on July 23, 2009; his accomplices are also serving long sentences.
Mohammed Modin Hasan	75673-083	Serving a life sentence. Currently at USP Yazoo City.	Somali pirate leader; convicted in November 2010 connection with an April 2010 attack on the American warship Nicholas, during which Hasan fired a rocket propelled grenade at what he believed was a merchant ship he and his co-defendants aimed to commandeer.
Charles McArther Emmanuel	76556-004	Serving a 97 year sentence, scheduled for release on June 18, 2090	Son of former president of Liberia Charles Taylor who was convicted on torture charges.
Ken Jenne	77434-004	Released from custody in 2008; served 1 year.	Former Broward County Sheriff; pleaded guilty in 2007 to mail fraud and tax evasion for illegally accepting over $150,000 in improper payments, income and other benefits from Sheriff's Office contractors.
Francisco Martin Duran	19588-016	Scheduled for release in 2029.	Attempted to assassinate President Bill Clinton on October 29, 1994, when he fired 29 rounds from an SKS rifle at the White House.
Eyad Ismoil	37802-054	Serving a 210-year prison sentence; scheduled for release in 2174. Moved to USP Victorville.	One of the men who planned and carried out the 1993 World Trade Center bombing.
Neftaly Platero	17666-035	Serving a life sentence without parole.	Murdered two of his fellow soldiers in 2010 in Fallujah, Iraq.

== See also ==
- List of United States federal prisons
- Federal Bureau of Prisons
- Incarceration in the United States
