= Robert Young Pelton =

Canadian-American author (born 1955)

- Born: July 25, 1955 (age 71); Edmonton, Alberta, Canada
- Occupations: Journalist, author, film director
- Children: Twin daughters
- Writing career
- Subject: Guides/Survival/Conflict
- Website: robertyoungpelton.com

Robert Young Pelton is a Canadian-American author, journalist, and documentary film director. Pelton's work usually consists of conflict reporting and interviews with military and political figures in war zones.

Pelton has been present at several struggles, such as the Battle of Qala-i-Jangi in Afghanistan, the Battle of Grozny (1999–2000) in Chechnya, the rebel siege to control Monrovia in Liberia, and the siege on Villa Somalia in Mogadishu. He spent time with the Taliban, the Northern Alliance (pre-9/11), the CIA during the hunt for Osama bin Laden and with both insurgents and Blackwater security contractors during the war in Iraq. Robert has been with ground forces on ~40 occasions.

Pelton's survival and political guide The World's Most Dangerous Places, provides information for people who work and travel in high-risk zones, and is a New York Times bestseller. He was also the host of the Discovery Travel Channel series entitled Robert Young Pelton's The World's Most Dangerous Places from 1998 to 2003. Currently residing in Los Angeles, Pelton writes books and produces documentaries on war-related subjects.

== Early life ==
Pelton was born July 25, 1955, in Edmonton, Alberta, Canada. At age 10, he began attending Grade 6 at Saint John's Cathedral Boys' School in Selkirk, Manitoba. The school is acclaimed for a wilderness curriculum featuring one thousand mile canoe trips, snowshoe marathons, raising animals, and advanced study of Latin, history, and religion. Later, an offshoot/affiliate school (St John's Ontario) became known for the deaths of a number of students in what became known as the Lake Timiskaming tragedy.

== Career ==
At age 17, Pelton began in the Toronto mailroom of the ad agency BBDO before being promoted to copywriter. He then worked for various multimedia companies that did product launches, which led to him working for Apple Inc., where he worked on the Lisa and later the Macintosh launch. His first break as a writer came in 1991, when he reported on the Camel Trophy, an annual competition by Land Rover across difficult terrain in Africa. Pelton competed for the U.S. team and published his account in Soldier of Fortune.

In 1993, Pelton purchased the name of the Fielding's Travel Guide from William Morrow and Company and published a couple of traditional guides that were focused toward younger, independent travelers.

Pelton licensed data-based travel content to companies such as Microsoft and IBM, selling his businesses to turn full-time to conflict coverage in the mid-1990s. He began with a two-book deal from Random House (The Adventurist and Come Back Alive), a television series from Discovery (The World's Most Dangerous Places), and a major web event with ABC News called Dangerous Places. Pelton created the concept of "solo" or "solo journalist". defined as a person who provides text, video, photos, and audio from remote regions without support. He founded the website Dangerous Magazine at which he published his own and other writers' articles about adventure travel.

In January 2003, Pelton was on assignment for National Geographic Adventure in the Darién Gap when he and two 22-year-old travelers were abducted by the United Self-Defense Forces of Colombia. The trio was held in the jungle for 10 days before being released.

Pelton contributed to National Geographic Adventure as both a contributing editor and a columnist from January 2001 to 2007. In December 2007, he released an article on Blackwater Worldwide. He was involved in negotiations with the President of Equatorial Guinea regarding the early release of coup plotters Simon Mann and Nick du Toit, who had worked for Executive Outcomes in the mid-1990s. The story was documented in the May 2008 Men's Journal article "How to Stage a Coup".

In 2006, Pelton teamed up with Eason Jordan, former head of international news for CNN, and several others to launch Iraq Slogger, a clearinghouse of news and information coming out of Iraq during the Iraq War. The site was intended to aggregate articles by both foreign correspondents and Iraqi journalists, as well as nonprofessionals. According to Pelton, the site had insufficient income and ceased operations in 2009.

In December 2008, Pelton travelled the Horn of Africa with both pirates and an anti-piracy crew researching the industry. Pelton resumed immersion-style coverage in January 2009 by going inside the U.S. Army's controversial Human Terrain System. Around that time, he also spent a year as an advisor to NATO's Afghanistan commander.

In 2008, Pelton and Jordan founded AfPax Insider, a newsgathering and research service in Afghanistan and Pakistan modeled on Iraq Slogger. The venture provided free content on its website and was partially funded by the U.S. military. Controversy arose when a Defense Department official who was operating an unauthorized spy ring allegedly diverted funds that were intended to pay the open-source project. According to Jordan, the venture never had a "full-fledged launch" into offering a premium subscription service to private clients, and due to insufficient funding, remained a free website until it became inactive in August 2009.

In 2011, Pelton created Somalia Report. With assistance from around 140 locals and western editors, Pelton provided ground coverage of al-Shabaab, pirates, governments, contractors, intelligence groups, and regular people on a 24/7 information website.

In June 2015, Pelton started publishing the Migrant Report to track the movement of refugees and migrants. The venture was sponsored by a non-profit organization in Malta. and provided in-depth coverage from Libya, Myanmar, and Bangladesh.

=== Books ===
The World's Most Dangerous Places

Pelton's first major writing project was his self-published guide to conflict, The World's Most Dangerous Places. The New York Times described it as "One of the oddest and most fascinating travel books to appear in a long time". CNN called the book a "compendium of the world's frightful places."

The first edition was written in 1993; it currently is in its fifth edition from Harper Resource.

The Adventurist

The Adventurist is Pelton's autobiography that covers his childhood and an assortment of later travel experiences around the world up until 1999.

Come Back Alive

A real-world survival guide, written in a humorous style.

Hunter, Hammer and Heaven, Three Worlds Gone Mad

A 2002 book on Pelton's journey into three wars in three tiny countries Chechnya, Sierra Leone, and Bougainville, which were examples of a jihad against the Russians, a mercenary war for resources, and an eco war to preserve a native lifestyle.

Licensed to Kill, Hired Guns in the War on Terror

Pelton has written about contemporary private military contractors, as well as his experiences with US Special Forces in the opening weeks in the war on terror. Of Licensed to Kill, one reviewer summarized: "He is a journalistic story-quilt of characters engaged as private security contractors and mercenaries in a variety of settings from Afghanistan to Equatorial Guinea... The pages turn... because Pelton's stories are intrinsically interesting." The book was reviewed by author and filmmaker Sebastian Junger ("An incredible look into the murky and virtually impenetrable world of private military contractors . . . Pelton may well have seen the future.") and terrorism expert Peter Bergen ("A rollicking read that takes the reader inside the murky world of military contractors—from the craggy passes of the Afghan-Pakistan border to the extreme danger of Baghdad's airport road, to the diamond fields of Africa. Licensed to Kill is not only a great travelogue, [but] it also has some important things to say about the brave new world of privatized violence").

Raven

Raven, Pelton's only novel, is a fictionalized account of his early life interwoven with experiences in the Pacific Northwest.

Civilian Warriors

In July 2013, Pelton stated in an interview with Spy Talk's Jeff Stein that Erik Prince had come to him to fix a ghostwritten autobiography that Prince had been unsuccessfully trying to publish since February 2008 with Regnery and again in 2010 with Simon & Schuster. According to the interview, Pelton rewrote Prince's book, hired a fact-checker to remove numerous plagiarized passages from the previous writers, and dissuaded Prince from self-publishing, getting Prince a US$1 million advance from Adrian Zackheim at Penguin Publishing.

=== Magazines ===
In late 2001, Pelton began writing feature stories for National Geographic Adventure and then continued writing a column until 2009 entitled, "Pelton's World" for National Geographic Adventure. His feature stories for National Geographic covered his journeys into Afghanistan, Iraq, and Colombia.

Pelton has written for and been profiled in numerous magazines including The World's Most Dangerous Friend by Tim Cahill in Men's Journal and Outside magazine covering topics such as Blackwater, the U.S. military Human Terrain System, South African mercenaries, and American military volunteers in rebel-held Burma. He also has written about his time with Somali pirates and maritime anti-piracy security teams for Bloomberg Businessweek and security contractors in Iraq for Popular Mechanics.

In May 2014, Vice magazine released a multimedia event which featured Pelton traveling with photographer Tim Freccia and with a former Lost Boy, Machot Lap Thiep, to South Sudan at the height of the fighting. It was the first time in Vice's 21-year history that a single author and single photographer created an entire issue on one topic. The 130-page, 50,000-word article was also released online In conjunction, a three-parter 40-minute documentary film entitled Saving South Sudan accompanied the article.

=== Graphic novels ===
Artist Billy Tucci illustrated and wrote a 64-page illustrated novel entitled Roll Hard based on one of Pelton's chapters in Licensed to Kill. The book documents the true story of a team of Blackwater misfits who must travel up and down the most dangerous road in Iraq. Pelton rode every mission with the team for a month, which routinely came under attack. After Pelton left the team, they were hit by an IED with one fatality and a number wounded. Wired magazine described it as "At a time when comics are still dominated by busty babes, zombies, and superheroes wearing tights, Pelton and Tucci's gritty, journalistic portrayal of America's fighters-for-hire is a profound departure."

Publishers Weekly described the book: "While that's a prime setup for endless scenes of action-movie carnage, the narrative instead focuses on the men as professionals and what makes them put their lives on the line for a daily payout around $600. It's that spotlight on the humanity of the contractors that make this an engaging read, and artist Tucci (Sgt. Rock: The Lost Battalion) turns in understated, realistic artwork that is among the finest of his career. While the role of contractors in the Iraq conflict is controversial, this gives it a human face."

=== Rebel, Jihadi, and insurgent groups ===
In order to gain access, Pelton has spent an unusual amount of time living with, traveling with, and documenting some of the world's well-known insurgent groups. Some of the groups Pelton has lived with and interviewed include: the Northern Alliance in Afghanistan, the LURD in Liberia, MILF in the Southern Philippines, Bougainville Revolutionary Army, the Sudan People's Liberation Army in Southern Sudan, the Taliban in Afghanistan, the FARC, and AUC in Colombia, the Chechen rebels and the Karen National Liberation Army, the Karen National Union and the Free Burma Rangers in Burma His access and interviews initially were to create The World's Most Dangerous Places. His unusual and death-defying efforts to get this access soon then morphed into his TV series and then into a series of other books and film projects.

Pelton has described and shown how he gets access and world exclusive interviews in his TV series The World's Most Dangerous Places for the Discovery Channel, investigating and reporting from the inside the drug business in Colombia and Peru, the mafia in Georgia and Turkey, and bounty hunting in Mexico.

=== Television series ===
Pelton executive produced and hosted seven one-hour specials for Discovery from 1998 until 2003. Pelton travels to meet rebel leaders in Afghanistan, Chechnya, the Philippines, Colombia, West Africa, and even militias in the United States. His list of interviews includes Afghan leaders like Massoud and General Dostum, African child soldiers and rebels in Liberia, Sierra Leone, and Sudan, Colombian rebels included the FARC's Mono Jojoy, Alphonso Cano, and Marulando, along with many other wanted leaders. One of his most well-known interviews is his exclusive interview of "American Taliban" John Walker Lindh. His interview was featured on CNN and became the first time an American al Qaeda member had been interviewed after 9/11.

=== Documentaries ===
After the publication of his book The World's Most Dangerous Places by Fielding Worldwide and then Harper Collins Pelton was a popular talk show guest. His solo efforts to "Dangerous Places" were featured by ABC News in a multi-part series on ABCNews.com. This idea was then developed into a long-term contract and documentary series with Discovery Communications He then began to make an eponymous series of documentaries, first in partnership with 44 Blue and then with Academy Award nominee Jonathan Stack. Pelton would also partner or assist other investigative filmmakers.

The Crescent and the Cross: Pelton's first documentary for Discovery takes viewers to the Philippines where he tracks down the country's most wanted terrorist, visits a crucifixion, stays with the MILF/BIAF in Mindanao, and becomes the first to film a Marxist rebel group on the island of Negros.

The Lion of Panjshir: Pelton spends three years trying to get to Massoud but is blocked by border guards, avalanches, and the Taliban. He documents his time with the Taliban during their occupation of Kabul and on the front lines. Later after teaming up with legendary cameraman Peter Jouvenal he finally interviews Massoud. The film is archived on the Massoud Foundation site.

Inside Liberia: Pelton journeys to the civil war in Liberia where he lives with a group of rebels who are surrounded by Charles Taylor's forces. Pelton befriends the Small Boys Unit who after a battle rewards him with a severed head. As conditions worsen the film lays out the horror of starvation and war with the help of James Brabazon, who had journeyed with the rebels a year earlier. Brabazon gathers evidence of smuggled weapons and Pelton would later journey to Equatorial Guinea to negotiate the release of their security detail who were caught up in the failed coup attempt in Equatorial Guinea.

Inside Colombia: An intense journey into a three-sided war with right-wing death squads, leftist guerrillas, and the government forces. Pelton is plunged into violence as he witnesses the murder of civilians, interviews the leaders of the FARC, and goes deep inside the cocaine business. Pelton was accompanied by writer Tim Cahill who later wrote "The Most Dangerous Friend" for Men's Journal and featured in his book "Hold the Enlightenment" and Men's Journals "Wild Stories" compendium.

The Legend of Heavy D and the Boys: General Dostum invites Pelton to cover his battle against the Taliban where Pelton documents ODA 595 later known as the "horse soldiers' a group of 12 men fighting on horseback. Pelton documents the Battle of Qali Jangi and its horrific aftermath and gives the world his exclusive interview with John Walker Lindh and an inside look at how secret special operations teams work.

Kidnapped: While his film crew waits in Texas to do an anniversary show on 9/11, Pelton is delayed. He has been kidnapped by the AUC-BEC death squads and is marched through the jungle at gunpoint. His captors release him when the leader of the AUC Carlos Castano remembers Pelton from the first interview Pelton had set up. Pelton also recounts his time in Chechnya and his motivations. This event was also recreated by actors as part of the National Geographic's Locked Up Abroad series.

House of War: Pelton produced "House of War" with documentary director Paul Yule to document the largest and most bloody battle in Operation Enduring Freedom, the Battle of Qala-i-Jangi.

Pelton went to Iraq to cover the war for ABC Investigative and then led a search for a find of chemical-tipped rockets for CBS's 60 Minutes. Pelton eventually chose to stay along the Syrian border with insurgents and later document evidence of mass graves around the country, traveling in a red Bentley previously owned by Uday Hussein.

Pelton would return to Iraq in late 2004 to live and work with a Blackwater USA security team running Route Irish in Baghdad while researching his book Licensed to Kill, Hired Guns in the War on Terror.

Iraq Guns for Hire: National Geographic hired Pelton to go inside the world of private security contractors for the film Iraq: Guns For Hire. as part of their Explorer series. Pelton provides unique access to several companies like Blackwater, Reed, Triple Canopy, and others in this human look at the dangerous job of protecting people and cargo in Iraq.

Iraq for Sale: The War Profiteers – a documentary by Robert Greenwald with footage and interviews of Pelton discussing mercenaries and contractors

Shadow Company – A feature-length documentary by Nick Bicanic with assistance from Pelton. The documentary voiced by Gerald Butler also features Pelton's exclusive footage and interviews discussing his time with mercenaries and private security contractors in Sierra Leone, Equatorial Guinea, Afghanistan, and Iraq.

Weapons of Mass Deception: Danny Schechter's documentary is about how the media was manipulated during the Iraq War. Pelton provides footage and commentary on his time in Iraq working for CBS 60 Minutes and ABC News Investigative Unit.

Saving South Sudan: Pelton's documentary for Vice was the first time the White Army had been filmed in combat and the first interview with Riek Machar and his wife after they fled to the bush. The film was part of a web event that was released along with Pelton authoring an entire issue of Vice magazine on South Sudan and Pelton's trip published by Vice.

Soldiers of Fortune: Pelton helped Dylan Welch produce an investigative piece about a plot to overthrow the government of Libya by a group of mercenaries backing Khalifa Haftar in ABC Australia Four Corners "Soldiers of Fortune" documentary.

=== Joseph Kony expedition ===
In 2013, Pelton launched a crowd funded campaign to locate Ugandan warlord Joseph Kony.

=== Migrant Offshore Aid Station ===
As of 2014, Pelton was a strategic advisor to the founders of the Search and Rescue NGO Migrant Offshore Aid Station or MOAS. In addition to advising the charity, Pelton arranged feature profile articles in the New York Times, Outside, BBC, ITV, and other media. Pelton also provided on-the-ground research on migrant conditions in camps and prisons in Libya, Myanmar, Bangladesh, Thailand, and Europe.

== Bibliography ==
- Robert Young Pelton (2007). Licensed to Kill, Hired Guns in the War on Terror (Reprint edition (2007) ed.). Three Rivers. p. 368. ISBN 978-1-4000-9782-1.
- Robert Young Pelton (2007). DP Professional Strength (2007 ed.). Collins. p. 304. ISBN 978-0-06-112021-3.
- Robert Young Pelton (2003). The World's Most Dangerous Places (2003 ed.). Collins. p. 1088. ISBN 0-06-001160-2.
- Robert Young Pelton (2001). The Adventurist, My Life in Dangerous Places (2001 ed.). Broadway. p. 268. ISBN 0-7679-0576-8.
- Robert Young Pelton (2002). Hunter Hammer and Heaven, Journeys to Three World's Gone Mad (2002 ed.). The Lyons. p. 320. ISBN 1-58574-416-6.
- Robert Young Pelton (1999). Come Back Alive (1999 ed.). Main Street. p. 304. ISBN 0-385-49566-8.
- Robert Young Pelton. Hired Guns (2007 ed.). Constable and Robinson. p. 320. ISBN 1-84529-590-0.
- The Best American Travel Writing
- Best Adventure and Travel Stories
- Robert Young Pelton; Mark Bowden; Tracy Kidder; Philip Taubman (2002). Nate Hardcastle; Clint Willis (eds.). American Soldier: Stories of Special Forces from Iraq to Afghanistan (First Edition (2002) ed.). Da Capo. p. 364. ISBN 1-56025-438-6.
- Boots on the Ground
- Robert Young Pelton (1997). Fielding's Hot Spots, Travel in Harm's Way (1997 ed.). Fielding Worldwide. p. 256. ISBN 1-56952-166-2.
- Robert Young Pelton (1995). Fielding's Borneo: The Adventurous Guide to the Island of Borneo Covering Brunei, Kalimantan, Sabah and Sarawak/1995 (Fielding's Borneo) (1995 ed.). Fielding Worldwide. p. 704. ISBN 1-56952-026-7.
- Robert Young Pelton (2003). Three Worlds Gone Mad: Dangerous Journeys through the War Zones of Africa, Asia, and the South Pacific (First edition (2003) ed.). The Lyons. p. 320. ISBN 1-59228-100-1.
