= Tim Freccia =

American photojournalist (born 1964)

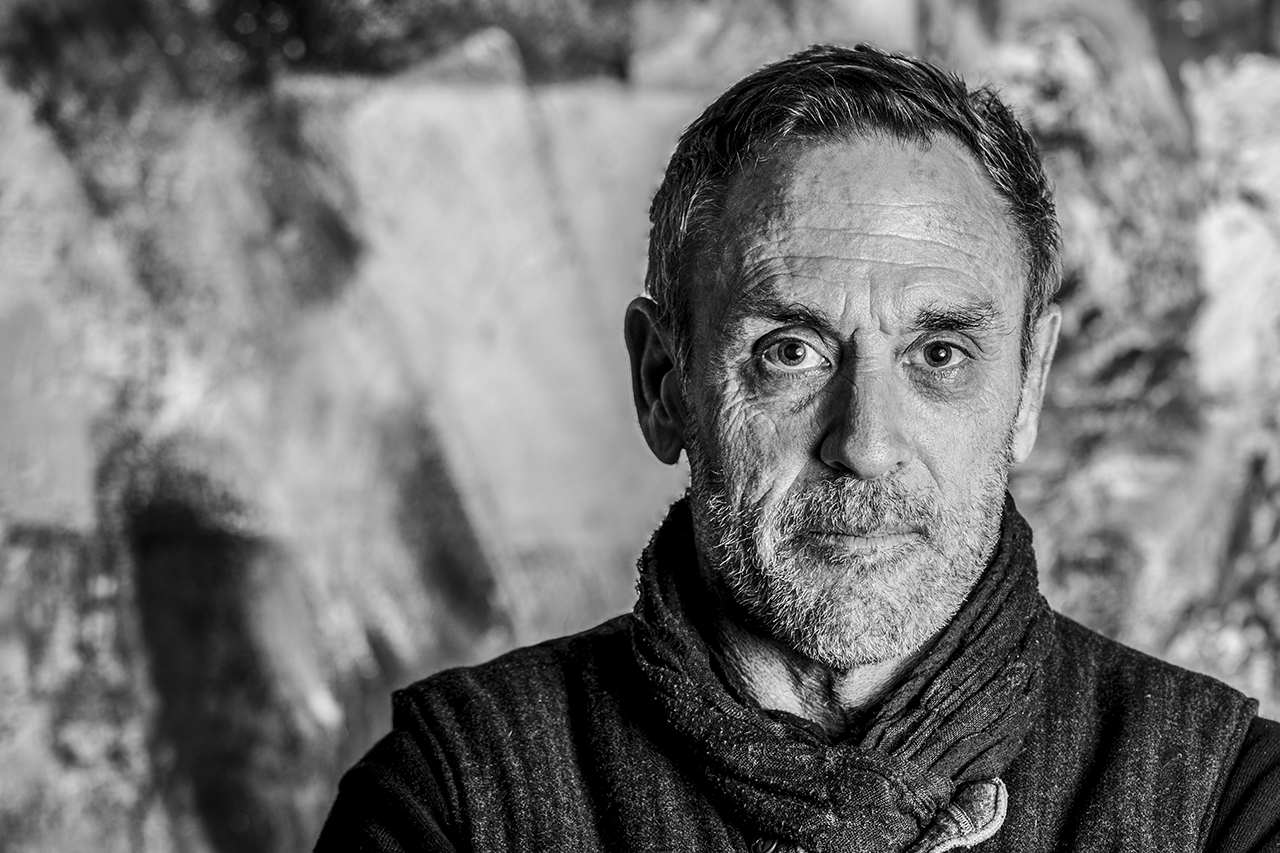
Tim Freccia in 2017

Tim Freccia (born 1964) is an American photojournalist and filmmaker.

Freccia started his career after finishing art school in 1989. He has covered topics including the Tuareg rebellions in Mali and Niger, the Indian Ocean tsunami, civil war in South Sudan, the earthquake in Haiti in 2010, the West African Ebola outbreak, and conflicts in Eastern Congo, Somalia, and Libya.

In the mid-1990s, Freccia co-founded and served as creative director for four full-service advertising and communications agencies in Berlin and Hamburg, Germany. In 2007, Freccia was creative director for startup software development company Xailabs.

Freccia was cinematographer for VICE Media's 2011 documentary Front Lines of the Libyan Revolution, which covered the ongoing Libyan civil war. He was writer, director, producer, and cinematographer for VICE's Africa's Cowboy Capitalists. Freccia was also the sole photographer for Vice Magazine's April 2014 issue titled "Saving South Sudan". He created a film of the same title with Robert Young Pelton.

His work has been featured in BBC, Al Jazeera, NBC, Der Spiegel, VICE, and Time.
