= Liberian Civil War =

The Liberian Civil War may refer to one of the following conflicts:

- First Liberian Civil War, 1989–1997
- Second Liberian Civil War, 1999–2003
