= Second Liberian Civil War =

1999–2003 war in West Africa

- Part of the Liberian Civil Wars and spillover of the Sierra Leone Civil War
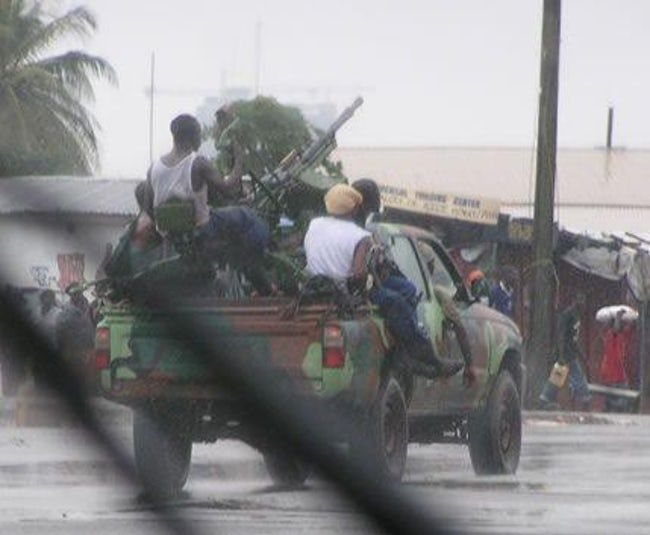
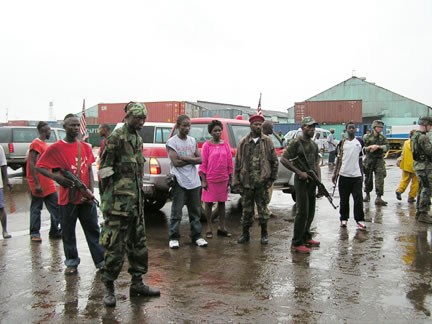
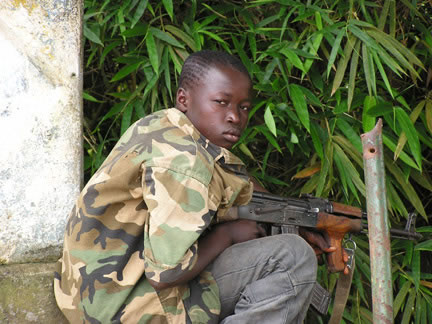
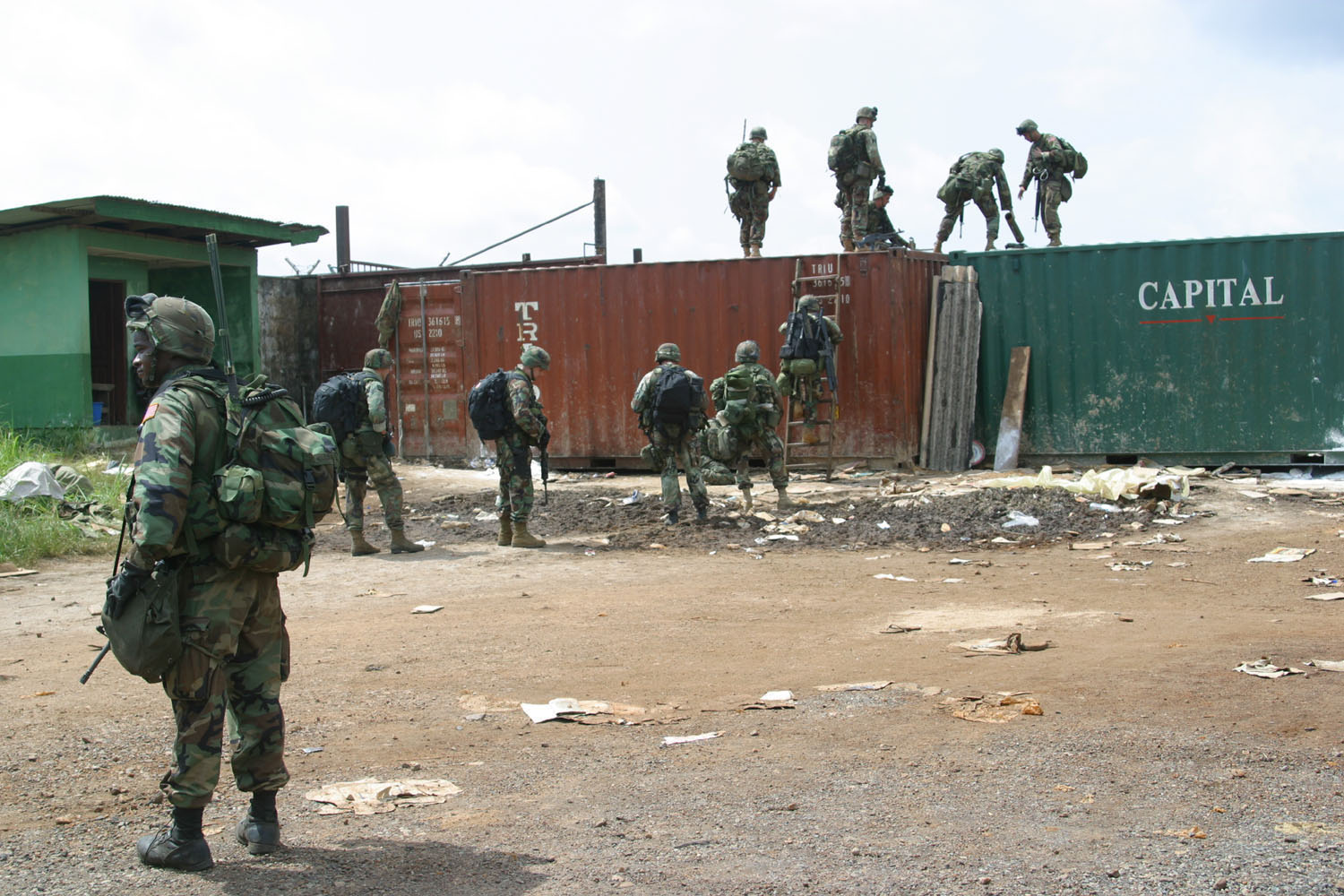
- Clockwise from top left: A technical belonging to Liberian rebel forces in Monrovia; A LURD commander soldiers in Monrovia; A child soldier of to LURD in the Po Valley; U.S Marines in Monrovia, 2003
Date	21 April 1999 – 18 August 2003 (4 years, 3 months and 4 weeks)
Location	Liberia, with spillovers in Guinea, Sierra Leone and Ivory Coast
Result	Rebel victory: Resignation of Charles Taylor and subsequent exile; Transitional Government of Liberia installed; Accra Peace Agreement signed; United Nations Mission in Liberia deployed

Belligerents
(Liberia) Liberian government: Loyalist Armed Forces elements; ATU; SOD; SSS; NPFL/NPP militias; RUF; RDFG	(Liberia) Rebel groups: Anti-Taylor Armed Forces elements; LURD; MODEL; Guinea; Sierra Leone

Commanders and leaders
(Liberia) Charles Taylor (Liberia) Benjamin Yeaten (Liberia) Chucky Taylor; Sam Bockarie (executed)	(Liberia) Gyude Bryant (Liberia) Sekou Conneh (Liberia) Thomas Nimely (Guinea) Lansana Conté

Strength
1,250–1,500 (2002) (Liberia) FAL: 11,000– 14,000 (2002); 12,000 (2003) (Liberia) Militias: 16,000 (2003)	(2003): (Liberia) 35,000 LURD (Liberia) 14,000 MODEL

Casualties and losses
~50,000 killed	

The Second Liberian Civil War was a civil war in the West African nation of Liberia that lasted from 1999 to 2003. The war was mainly caused by transition failures after the First Civil War, especially the peace-building process which would result from re-integration, disarmament, rehabilitation and demobilization.

President Charles Taylor came to power in 1997 after victory in the First Liberian Civil War which led to two years of peace. The Liberians United for Reconciliation and Democracy (LURD), an anti-Taylor rebel group backed by the government of Guinea, invaded northern Liberia in mid-2000, seizing the city of Voinjama. LURD made gradual gains against Taylor in the north and began approaching the capital Monrovia by early 2002. The Movement for Democracy in Liberia (MODEL), a second anti-Taylor rebel group, invaded southern Liberia in early 2003 and quickly conquered most of the south. Taylor, reduced to controlling only a third of Liberia and under pressure from the Siege of Monrovia, resigned in August 2003 and fled to Nigeria. The Accra Comprehensive Peace Agreement was signed by the warring parties a week later, marking the political end of the conflict and beginning Liberia's transition to democracy. The National Transitional Government led by interim President Gyude Bryant governed the country until the 2005 general election.

The Second Liberian Civil War resulted in the deaths of over 50,000 people and the internal displacement of thousands more. The conflict saw the widespread use of child soldiers by both Taylor and LURD. The United Nations Mission in Liberia was deployed in the country until it was officially withdrawn in 2018.

== Overview ==
=== Background ===
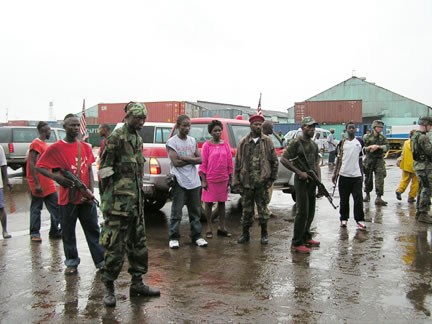
LURD commander "Gen. Cobra" with his guards

The First Liberian Civil War ended in August 1997 when Charles Taylor took power as the President of Liberia. Taylor had initiated the war when he and his militia, the National Patriotic Front of Liberia (NPFL), invaded the country from the Ivory Coast to overthrow President Samuel Doe in December 1989. The NPFL rapidly conquered most of Liberia except for the capital Monrovia, which came under the control of the Independent National Patriotic Front of Liberia (INPFL), a splinter group led by Prince Johnson. The INPFL captured and executed Doe in September 1990 and resisted attempts by the NPFL to take Monrovia, denying Taylor an outright victory and prolonging the war for years. A peace agreement was signed in 1996 between the major factions and resulted in the 1997 Liberian general election.

Taylor won a landslide victory with 75% of the vote for the presidency, while his National Patriotic Party dominated the Legislature of Liberia. His success was mainly due to his control over the media, fear that the war would restart if he lost, and a general unfamiliarity with democratic processes among the Liberian public. Taylor quickly established a totalitarian and corrupt regime, with many dissidents fleeing to neighboring countries. Taylor's ambition of establishing Liberia as a regional power led to him supporting rebel groups such as the Rally of Democratic Forces of Guinea in the RFDG Insurgency and the Revolutionary United Front in the Sierra Leone Civil War. This brought him into conflict with the governments of Guinea and Sierra Leone who, in retaliation, began supporting the anti-Taylor dissidents that had fled to their countries.

=== LURD invasion ===
The second civil war began in April 1999, when Liberian dissidents under the banner of the Organization of Displaced Liberians invaded Liberia from Guinea. Guinea became LURD's main source of military and financial support. By July 2000, the various dissident groups had coalesced as the LURD led by Sekou Conneh. The dissidents were thought to be mostly Mandinka and Krahn fighters of the former ULIMO-J and ULIMO-K.

Also important in forming LURD was an alliance, brokered by ECOMOG-SL Nigerian chief General Maxwell Khobe, between Liberian dissidents and the Sierra Leonean Kamajors hunter militia, including chiefs Samuel Hinga Norman and Eddie Massally. Against the dissidents Taylor deployed irregular ex-National Patriotic Front of Liberia fighters with his more privileged units, such as the Anti-Terrorist Unit, positioned to ensure the irregulars did fight.

Simultaneous September 2000 counter-attacks on Guinea from Liberia and Sierra Leone by RUF – still loyal to Taylor and Guinean dissidents – achieved initial success. By January 2001, however, Taylor's forces were pushed back inside Sierra Leone and Liberia. The insurgents were posing a major threat to the Taylor government. Liberia was now engaged in a complex three-way conflict with Sierra Leone and the Guinea Republic.

By the beginning of 2002, both of these countries were supporting LURD, while Taylor was supporting various opposition factions in both countries. By supporting — practically creating — the SL rebels, the Revolutionary United Front (RUF), Taylor also drew the enmity of the British and Americans. British and U.S. pressure on Taylor increased with rising financial support for Guinea and U.S./U.K.-proposed sanctions, a weaker version of which were imposed by U.N. Security Council May 2001.

=== Rebels approach Monrovia ===
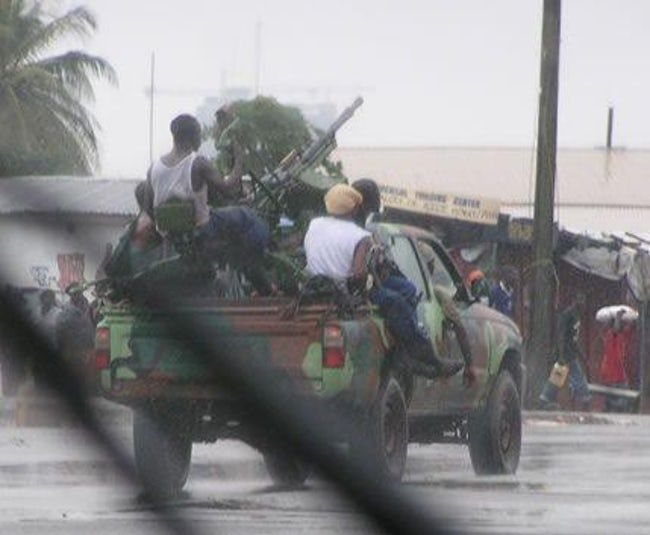
A technical with a mounted machine gun, Monrovia.

By mid-February 2002 LURD troops were just 44 kilometres from Monrovia, at Klay Junction, and Taylor was forced to declare a state of emergency. The February 2002 ICG report says that this attack was made by pursuing ‘a strategy of infiltration of south-western Liberia through the thick bush of Southern Lofa, looping around government strongholds and disrupting supply lines... while LURD claims between 300 and 500 men were assigned to that mission, ... the number that actually attacked was likely closer to twenty.’ Any image of a large force gradually pushing toward Monrovia is mistaken; ‘hit and run’ raids, rather than a continuous advance, seem to have been the pattern.

Through the first half of 2002 LURD mounted raids in Bomi, Bong, and Montserrado counties, hitting, in addition to Klay Junction, Gbarnga and Tubmanburg, each time temporarily seizing control from government fighters. In May, an attack on Arthington, less than 20 kilometres from the capital, apparently prompted panic in Monrovia. The state of emergency was lifted in September 2002, after, the government claimed, the township of Bopolu had been retaken.

In early 2003, a second rebel group, the Ivoirian-backed Movement for Democracy in Liberia (MODEL), emerged in the south, and by the summer of 2003, Taylor's government controlled only a third of the country. Despite some setbacks, by mid-2003 LURD controlled the northern third of the country and was threatening the capital. The capital Monrovia was besieged by LURD, and that group's shelling of the city resulted in the deaths of many civilians. Thousands of people were displaced from their homes as a result of the conflict.

A new bout of fighting began in March 2003 after a relative lull and by early May, LURD and MODEL had gained control of nearly two-thirds of the country, and were threatening Monrovia. Regional and wider pressure led to the convening of a conference in Accra by the then Chair of the Economic Community of West African States (ECOWAS), President John Kufuor of Ghana, on 4 June 2003.

=== Siege of Monrovia (July–August 2003) ===
By July 2003 Monrovia appeared to be in danger of being occupied and devastated despite ongoing peace talks. The U.S. established Joint Task Force Liberia, built around a U.S. navy amphibious group with the 26th Marine Expeditionary Unit aboard, positioned off the West African coast.

In July 2003 the United States (US) sent a small number of troops to bolster security around the US embassy in Monrovia, which had come under attack during Operation Shining Express. On 25 July 2003, the Southern Europe Task Force at Vicenza, Italy was designated the lead U.S. Army command for the operation.

On 29 July 2003, LURD declared a ceasefire. ECOWAS sent two battalions of Nigerian peacekeepers to Liberia. The first Nigerian battalion detached from the United Nations Mission in Sierra Leone, and the second came from Nigeria itself.

=== President Taylor resigns (August 2003) ===
President Taylor resigned on 11 August 2003, ahead of the Accra Comprehensive Peace Agreement (CPA) which formed the negotiated end to the war, and was flown into exile in Nigeria. An arrest warrant for Taylor for war crimes committed by his RUF rebel allies in Sierra Leone was later issued by Interpol but Nigeria refused to deport him for a time unless they receive a specific request from Liberia. Vice-President Moses Blah replaced Taylor.

On 14 August, rebels lifted their siege of Monrovia and 200 United States Marines landed to support a West African peace force. Thousands of people danced and sang as American troops and ECOMIL, the Nigerian-led West African forces, took over the port and bridges which had split the capital into government and rebel-held zones. An estimated 1,000 people had been killed in Monrovia between 18 July and 14 August.

Moses Blah handed over power to the National Transitional Government of Liberia on 14 October 2003. However, the transitional government exercised no real authority in the country, 80% of which was controlled by the rebel groups. Riots in Monrovia left approximately 16 people dead, with sources claiming that former combatants were behind the violence.

== Child soldiers ==
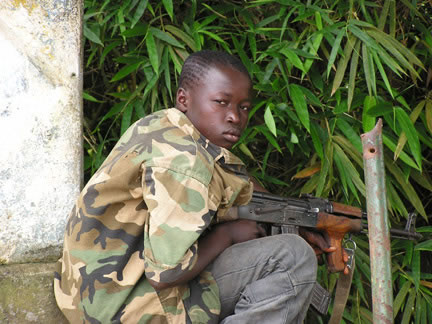
LURD child soldier

Both LURD and Charles Taylor made extensive use of children press ganged into military service as soldiers or ammunition porters. The use of child soldiers was prolific by both sides, regardless of prohibitions of the practice in the Geneva Convention. Observers from Human Rights Watch described a deadly and chaotic siege of Monrovia, with many very young fighters shooting "shiny toys" they had not been trained to use.

Drugs made up an integral part of Liberian wartime culture. Child soldiers and other combatants were routinely addicted to cocaine, khat, and other drugs as a means of control. Several warlords felt that cocaine made soldiers more effective in battle.

== United Nations peacekeeping ==
In November 1997, following the completion of the mandate of the United Nations Observer Mission in Liberia UNOMIL on 30 September, the United Nations established the United Nations Peace-building Support Office in Liberia (UNOL), headed by a representative of the Secretary-General. That first United Nations post-conflict peace-building support office was tasked primarily with assisting the government in consolidating peace following the July 1997 multiparty elections.

On 11 September 2003, UN Secretary General Kofi Annan recommended deployment of the peacekeeping mission, the United Nations Mission in Liberia (UNMIL), to maintain the peace agreement. The UN Security Council approved the mission on 19 September in Resolution 1509. Nigeria sent in peacekeepers as part of the interim ECOWAS force. UNMIL was made up of over 15,000 personnel, including both military and civilian troops.

The bulk of the personnel were armed military troops, but there were also civilian policemen, as well as political advisers and humanitarian aid workers. On 1 October, the first peacekeepers changed their berets and became a UN force, with many more troops earmarked. During three days of riots in Monrovia in October 2004, nearly 400 people were wounded and 15 killed. The UN slowly built up its forces in the country, with 5,500 projected to be in place by November 2003, and worked to disarm the various factions. However, instability in neighbouring countries, an incomplete disarmament process, and general discontent threatened Liberia's fragile peace.

== Women of Liberia ==
A group of Liberian women headed by Leymah Gbowee formed an organization called "Women of Liberia Mass Action for Peace" and forced a meeting with President Charles Taylor, extracting a promise from him to attend peace talks in Ghana. A delegation of women organized nonviolence protests and continued to apply pressure on the warring factions during the peace process. They staged a silent protest outside of the Presidential Palace, bringing about an agreement during the stalled peace talks. Their creative non-violent protest allowed them to use the power within women and mothers of Liberia; tactics included a sex strike until their men chose to set aside weapons, and threatening to undress during a sit in outside the peace talks in Ghana.

Working together, over 3,000 Christian and Muslim women mobilized their efforts, and as a result, the women were able to achieve peace in Liberia after a 14-year civil war and helped bring to power the country's first female president. The story is told in the 2008 documentary film Pray the Devil Back to Hell.

Among the women leaders who helped end the civil war was Ellen Johnson Sirleaf, who would become the first modern elected female head of state in Africa when she was elected in 2005. Her election was inspired by the powerful commitment of women who had seen the war perpetuated by men in their country and were unwilling to put a man back into that powerful role. This was despite the fact that Ellen Johnson-Sirleaf's role in triggering the war in the 1980s had hampered her presidential prospects in the 1990s. While the Truth and Reconciliation Commission had recommended that she be banned from participating in politics for 30 years, she was re-elected for a second term in 2011.

== Aftermath ==
In 2025, the Liberian government, under President Joseph Boakai, issued an official apology to victims of the conflict.

== See also ==
- Living in Emergency: Stories of Doctors Without Borders (documentary film about Médecins Sans Frontières's work in Liberia after the war)

General:

- History of Liberia
