= Luigi Lenzini =

Italian Roman Catholic priest

Blessed Luigi Lenzini

Martyr
- Born: 28 May 1881; Fiumalbo, Modena, Kingdom of Italy
- Died: 21 July 1945 (aged 64); Crocette di Parvullo nel Frignano, Modena, Kingdom of Italy
- Venerated in: Roman Catholic Church
- Beatified: 28 May 2022, Piazza Grande, Modena by Cardinal Marcello Semeraro
- Feast: 21 July

Luigi Lenzini (28 May 1881 – 21 July 1945) was an Italian Roman Catholic priest that served as a pastor in the Archdiocese of Modena-Nonatola. Communist partisans killed him at his parish.

Lenzini started his studies for the priesthood in 1897 before his sacerdotal ordination in 1904. He served in several parishes around the area before he moved to Rome for several months in the hopes of becoming a Redemptorist. This effort fell through due to the fact that he discerned his path was to remain as a diocesan priest rather than a religious one. He opposed fascism and communism during World War II but tried to befriend some of the partisans in his parish to get to know and understand them better. This caused some to grow frustrated with him due to his repeated condemnations of their ideologies, leading them to confront Lenzini before killing him in an abandoned field not far from his parish.

The process for his beatification opened in Modena some decades after his death. Pope Francis confirmed in 2020 that he had died due to hatred for the Christian faith that enabled for Lenzini to be beatified in Modena on 28 May 2022.

== Life ==
Luigi Lenzini was born in Fiumalbo on 28 May 1881 to the devout and wealthy Angelo and Silvia Lenzini. He decided in his youth to become a priest.

He commenced his studies at the seminary for the priesthood in 1897 (taking the clerical cassock in 1898 at Christmas) before moving to Modena in 1901 to continue with his studies. Here, he studied philosophy and theology. He received his sacerdotal ordination on 19 March 1904 from the Archbishop of Modena Natale Bruni before celebrating his first Mass in his hometown before his family and friends. He began as a chaplain in Casinalbo and then, his first parish was at Finale Emilia where the new mayor, a socialist, prohibited the religious courses. He began pastoral work in both Roncosaglia (1912–21) and Montecuccolo (1921–37). He decided to go to Rome in late 1937 in the hopes of becoming a Redemptorist priest, but this plan fell through in 1939, and his bishop recalled him to work in Gaiato. On 26 January 1941, he became the parish priest for Crocette, where he encountered some partisans. He made an effort to get to know the partisans and their motivations, despite his staunch opposition to communism, angering some of them with his public denunciations of the ideology. Lenzini staunchly opposed fascism during World War II, describing it as a set of principles that were inherently opposed to the Christian faith.

During the early hours of 21 July 1945, at roughly 2 am, several masked disgruntled communist partisans visited the parish looking for him hoping to trap him by luring him to visit a dying man. However, unbeknownst to them, Lenzini had already met that man earlier that day, so fearing a trap, he ran to the bell tower to ring it for help. However, no one came to the church to help, and the partisans forcibly took him about a kilometer away from the parish to an open vineyard where they attacked him. His remains were found the next day showing signs of torture.

== Beatification ==
The process for his beatification opened in the Archdiocese of Modena-Nonatola on 27 October 2009. The diocesan investigation of collecting documentation to support the case spanned from 8 June 2011 until 24 November 2012. Pope Francis confirmed that Lenzini had died "in hatred of faith" (In odium fidei) in a decree issued on 27 October 2020; this recognition enabled for Lenzini to be beatified in Modena on 28 May 2022. The postulator for this cause is Francesca Consolini.
