= Rally of Democratic Forces of Guinea =

- Leader: Mohamed Lamine Fofana (alleged)
- Dates active: 1996–2001
- Active regions: Guinea and Liberia
- Size: 1,800–5,000
- Wars: RFDG Insurgency and Second Liberian Civil War

The Rally of Democratic Forces of Guinea (French: Rassemblement des forces démocratiques de Guinée) was a minor Guinean rebel group. This group was represented in the media by a man identifying as Mohamed Lamine Fofana, but whose identity was questionable.

The RFDG launched a series of attacks against Guinean government forces from its base located in Liberia on September 11, 2000. The Guinean state forces launched a counteroffensive against the RFDG and Liberian forces on September 22. Heavy fighting lasted through March 2001. An ECOWAS meeting in April 2001 was able to prevent this conflict from escalating into a full-scale war between Guinea and Liberia, and was able to end the civil war between RFDG and the Guinean state.
