= Lanzini =

Lanzini is an Italian surname. Notable people with the surname include:

- Ennio Zelioli-Lanzini (1899–1976), Italian politician
- Manuel Lanzini (born 1993), Argentine football attacking midfielder
- Tomás Lanzini (born 1991), Argentine footballer
