= Anti-Terrorist Unit (Liberia) =

Paramilitary force of the government of Liberia (1998–2003)

- Active: 1998–2003
- Country: Liberia
- Role: Infantry
- Size: 1,200~
- Engagements: Second Liberian Civil War; First Ivorian Civil War

Commanders
- Notable commanders: Chuckie Taylor; Benjamin Yeaten

The Anti-Terrorist Unit (ATU), also known as the Anti-Terrorist Brigade, was a paramilitary force of the government of Liberia, established by then-President Charles Taylor in 1997–98. Chuckie Taylor, Charles Taylor's son, served as commander of the force for a period. The ATU was initially organized ostensibly to protect government buildings, the executive mansion, the international airport, and to provide security for some foreign embassies. It was a special forces group consisting predominantly of foreign nationals from Burkina Faso and The Gambia, as well as former Revolutionary United Front (RUF) combatants from Sierra Leone.

The ATU had no legal basis for its existence, and was not under the command of the Ministry of Defense. The ATU absorbed Taylor's most experienced NPFL civil war fighters, including undisciplined and untrained loyalists. Sam Bockarie (alias Mosquito), and Brig. Gen. Abu were named as being among the ATU's senior personnel in a report issued in October 2001. According to a report from the UN Panel of Experts on Diamonds and Arms in Sierra Leone, issued in December 2000, a former South African Defence Force (SADF) officer, Fred Rindel, trained up to 1,200 ATU personnel between September 1998 and August 2000, when Rindel cancelled his contract following negative media attention.

During 2002 ATU members increasingly were involved in criminal activities such as theft, looting, and murder in Monrovia. More than in the past, the perpetrators were apprehended; however, cases against them remained unresolved at year's end. Two ATU members arrested in November 2001 after looting a private residence in Monrovia were released during 2002.

There were many unlawful killings by security forces during 2002. For example, on June 19, an ATU officer and presidential guards opened fire on a taxicab in Monrovia and killed a 6-year-old child and critically injured his mother and the driver. President Taylor ordered an investigation of the incident, which was ongoing at year's end. In September Lt. Isaac Gono, a driver attached to ATU chief Charles Taylor Jr.'s command, was beaten to death by his colleagues as a disciplinary measure for denting a vehicle. Two soldiers were arrested and held for court martial. The trial was opened; however, it later was suspended for unknown reasons, and the case was pending at year's end.

Former Deputy Minister of Labor Bedell Fahn and four members of the ATU arrested for torturing two Nigerian men to death in October 2001 were tried during 2002. Fahn was sentenced to 10 months in prison; however, in September he was released. Two ATU members were acquitted and the other two were sentenced to life imprisonment.

The National Transitional Government of Liberia disbanded the ATU, as part of Liberia's larger post-war demobilisation process.

== See also ==
- Iraqi Republican Guard
- United States Secret Service
