= Tubmanburg =

Tubmanburg Bomi
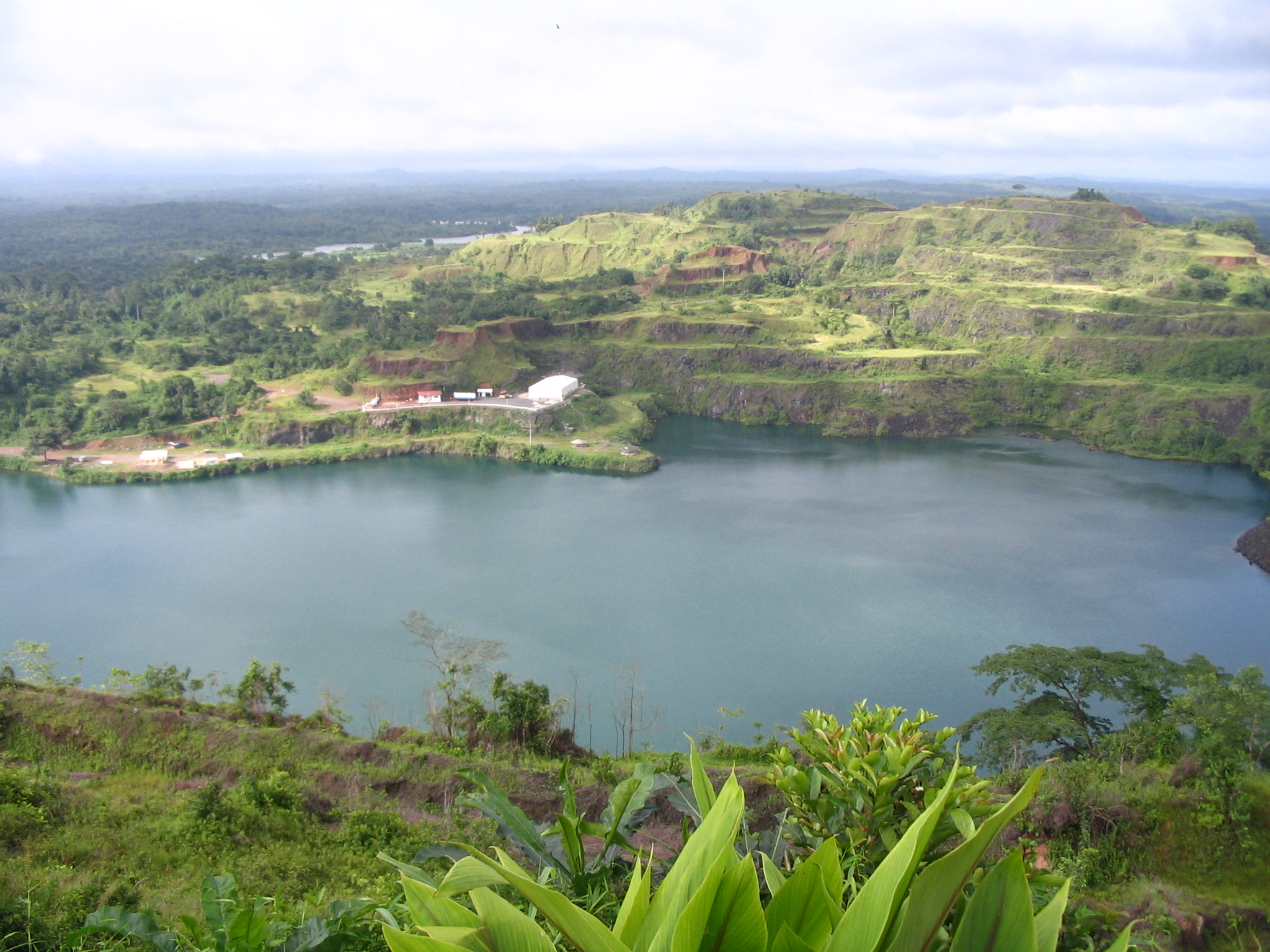
- Lake at Tubmanburg

- Location in Liberia
- Coordinates: 6°52′N 10°49′W
- Country: Liberia
- County: Bomi County

Government
  - Superintendent: James Karpeh
  - Deputy Superintendent: Clyde Gargar
  - City Mayor: Daniel Tokpa
  - Deputy City Mayor: Bruce Saydee
  - City Manager: Terrence Gbor
- Elevation: 114 m (374 ft)

Population (2008)
  - Total: 13,114
- Climate: Am

Tubmanburg, also known as Bomi and formerly Vaitown, is the capital of Bomi County in Liberia. It lies in the Bomi Hills northwest of Monrovia and was an iron ore and diamond mining centre until it was largely destroyed in the First Liberian Civil War. During the Second Liberian Civil War, it was the headquarters of the Liberians United for Reconciliation and Democracy rebel group. Most residents are members of the Vai tribe.

A key attraction is Blue Lake, also known as Bomi Lake. Blue Lake is about 300 feet (about 100 m) deep. It is suspended midway between the peaks of the surrounding mountains which, with the sun’s reflection, give the lake its blue hue. The waters spring from a huge pit dug by the Liberia Mining Company, an American-owned company that ceased operations in the country because of the presumed depletion of iron ore in the area.

As of the 2008 census, Tubmanburg has an estimated population of 13,144. Of this, 6,555 were male and 6,559 female.

The town is populated predominantly by the Gola ethnic group, which hails from Bomi County. The town also has a significant Mandingo and Vai population.

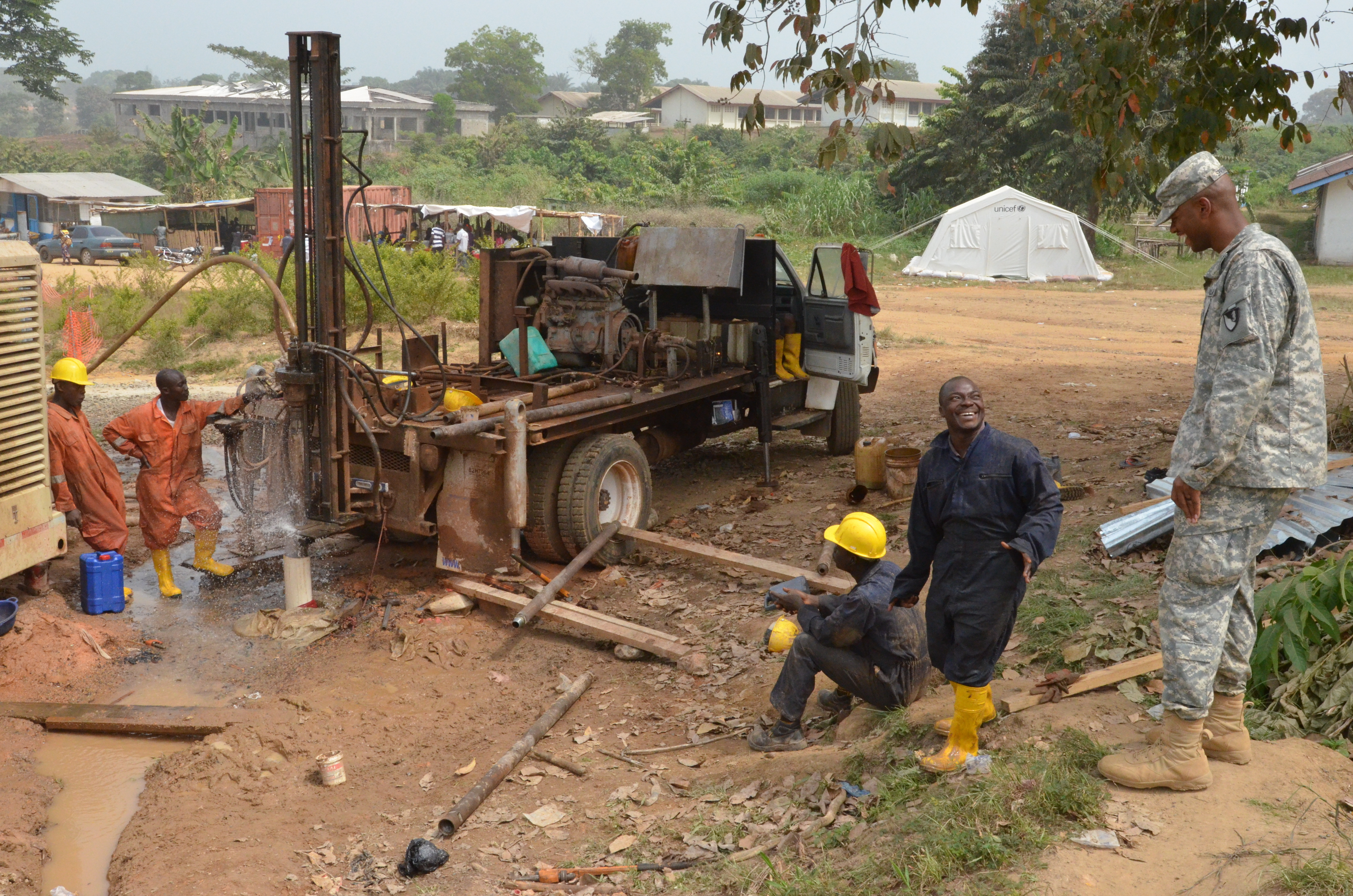
Liberians build a well at an Ebola treatment facility in Tubmanburg during the West African Ebola virus epidemic of 2014–15.

During the Ebola virus epidemic in West Africa a treatment center was opened in the town with the assistance of the United States.

== History ==
Long associated with the Liberian Mining Company (LMC; a subsidiary of Republic Steel Corporation), which closed down mining operations in the late 1970s. LMC built a hospital, schools, housing, and an electric generating plant. The city was renamed Tubmanburg after former Liberian president William Tubman.
