= Progressive People's Party (Liberia) =

Political party in Liberia

The Progressive People's Party (PPP) is a political party in Liberia.

In the 1997 elections, PPP presidential candidate Chea Cheapoo won 0.34% of the vote while the party failed to win any seats in the bicameral Legislature. Cheapoo was formerly a leading member of the Progressive Alliance of Liberia (PAL) opposition party during the 1970s and its successor, the Progressive People's Party, during the early 1980s.

It did not file candidates in the 11 October 2005 elections, but Cheapoo was once again the party's candidate for president in 2011, winning 0.3% of the vote and no seats in the legislature. Its current status is unclear.
