= Charles McArther Emmanuel =

American-Liberian war criminal (born 1978)

- Emmanuel during his time in Liberia
- Born: February 12, 1978 (age 48); Boston, Massachusetts, U.S.
- Other name: Roy M. Belfast Jr.
- Parents: Charles Taylor; Bernice Emmanuel
- Status: Incarcerated
- Convictions: Torture (5 counts); Conspiracy to commit torture resulting in death Use of a firearm during a crime of violence Conspiracy to use a firearm during a crime of violence Passport fraud
- Penalty: 97 years imprisonment

Details
- Span of crimes: 1999–2002
- Date apprehended: March 30, 2006
- Imprisoned at: USP Lee

Charles McArther Emmanuel (born February 12, 1978), also known as Chuckie Taylor, is an American-Liberian former soldier and war criminal. He is the son of Charles Taylor, the former President of Liberia.

Raised by his mother in the U.S. until he was 16, Taylor Jr. traveled to Liberia in 1994 to live with his father. During his father's presidency, he became the commander of the infamously violent Anti-Terrorist Unit (ATU), commonly known in Liberia as the "Demon Forces". After returning to the United States, he was arrested by the government for human rights violations committed by the ATU. He is currently serving a 97-year sentence.

== Early life ==
Born on February 12, 1978, in Boston, Emmanuel lived much of his life in Orlando, Florida, with his mother, Bernice Emmanuel, a college girlfriend of Taylor. Fearful of Taylor's attempting to claim custody of Emmanuel, his mother had his name legally changed to Roy Belfast Jr., the name of her husband. His house, in a neighborhood described as "middle class", was 9 miles (14 km) away from Universal Orlando Resort.

He attended Maynard Evans High School. In 1994, when he was a teenager he was involved in an altercation with deputies of Orange County, Florida. Afterward, Emmanuel moved to Liberia to live with his father, who in turn enrolled him in the Accra Academy, an elite boarding school in Ghana. Emmanuel was expelled, and according to Johnny Dwyer of The Guardian, possession of alcohol and illegal drugs was reportedly the reason.

He later attended the College of West Africa in Monrovia, and the principal of that school also expelled him. He had exposure to the First Liberian Civil War, spending time with Bill Horace whose military unit was known for crucifixions and executions.

== Career ==
Initially, Emmanuel pursued a career in the timber trade. He then established and commanded the Anti-Terrorist Unit (ATU) to serve as his father's security force. According to U.S. prosecutors, when in Liberia, Emmanuel headed the "Demon Forces", a paramilitary, anti-terrorism security unit for Charles Taylor.

Between 1999 and 2002, Emmanuel murdered at least four men, three of whom he shot, and another whom he ordered killed, and committed gruesome acts of torture in Liberia. The acts of torture he committed or was complicit in include beating, burning, jabbing, electrocution, and mutilation, especially of the genitals, shoveling stinging ants into people's bodies, forcing people to rape each other as he watched and laughed, forcing them to eat cigarette butts, and forcing them to drink urine.

== Arrest and trial ==
In 2006, Emmanuel was placed under arrest at Miami International Airport after flying from Trinidad to Miami. He carried a passport that he received after falsifying his father's name on the application. The Domestic Security Section of the United States Department of Justice accused Emmanuel of passport fraud. That December, he pleaded guilty and was sentenced to 11 months in prison. Around the same time, he was then charged for participating in torture in Liberia. Emmanuel's trial was the first case where a U.S. citizen was prosecuted under a 1994 law that prohibits American citizens from participating in torture outside of the United States. Emmanuel was incarcerated at FDC Miami. Emmanuel rejected an offer to plead guilty in exchange for leniency.

Elise Keppler, a counsel for the International Justice Program of Human Rights Watch, said that the "Demon Forces" "did things like beating people to death, burying them alive, rape – the most horrible kind of war crimes." U.S. prosecutors also charged that the "Demon Forces" engaged in torture and attempted to silence critics of Charles Taylor. At Emmanuel's trial, Rufus Kpadeh, a former prisoner in Liberia, testified that Emmanuel's forces coerced prisoners into engaging in sexual acts while Emmanuel laughed.

In October 2008, a jury convicted Emmanuel of 8 counts, including for torture, conspiracy to commit torture, and possession of a firearm while committing a violent crime. In January 2009, Judge Cecilia Altonaga sentenced Taylor to 97 years in prison. He planned to appeal his conviction. According to the Department of Justice, Taylor tortured victims with various means, including "burning victims with molten plastic, lit cigarettes, scalding water, candle wax and an iron; severely beating victims with firearms; cutting and stabbing victims; and shocking victims with an electric device."

That same day, the World Organization for Human Rights USA filed a civil suit in the United States District Court for the Southern District of Florida on behalf of five of Taylor Jr.'s victims pursuant to the Alien Tort Statute and the Torture Victims Protection Act. The plaintiffs won by a default judgment on all counts. The civil trial to determine damages took place in late December 2009 and January 2010.

As of 2009, Emmanuel was incarcerated in a federal prison in Florida. As of 2019 he, under the name Roy M Belfast Jr. (Bureau of Prisons (BOP)#76556-004), is serving his sentence at the United States Penitentiary in Lee County, Virginia. His release date is June 18, 2090.
