= The World's Most Dangerous Places =

Book by Robert Young Pelton

Robert Young Pelton's The World's Most Dangerous Places
- First edition
- Author: Robert Young Pelton
- Language: English
- Genre: Guide book, War tourism
- Publisher: HarperResource
- Publication date: 1st edition (1994); 4th edition (May 30, 2000); 5th edition (April 1, 2003)
- Publication place: United States
- Media type: Print
- Pages: 1088
- ISBN: 0-06-001160-2
- Followed by: DP Professional Strength

The World's Most Dangerous Places is handbook of survival tactics for high-risk regions first published in 1994, written by National Geographic Adventure columnist Robert Young Pelton and his contributors. The fifth edition was published in 2003.

== Summary ==
The book is divided into three parts.

The first is a primer on the basics of staying safe in war zones and high-crime areas. This includes safety advice regarding transportation, crime, terrorism, assault, bribery, disease, drugs, weapons, kidnappings, land mines, mercenaries, and more.

The second is essentially a chapter-by-chapter list of dangerous locales. Each nation or autonomous administrative division is assigned a rating depending on the level and type of danger.

The third section contains the authors' first-hand stories of traveling through the listed places.

== Bibliography ==
- Robert Young Pelton. The World's Most Dangerous Places (April 1, 2003 ed.). Collins. p. 1088. ISBN 0-06-001160-2.
- The Best American Travel Writing
- Best Adventure and Travel Stories
- Boots on the Ground
