= Movement for Democracy in Liberia =

Former Liberian rebel group

Map of areas under MODEL control in September 2003

The Movement for Democracy in Liberia (MODEL) was a rebel group in Liberia that became active in March 2003, launching attacks from Ivory Coast. MODEL was based on the Force Spéciale pour la Libération du Monde Africain (LIMA) militia formed in September 2002 to defend Laurent Gbagbo's government against insurgents backed by Liberia's president Charles Taylor. After fighting off the imminent threat, parts of LIMA crossed the border to Liberia to continue the war there. With Taylor's forces already pressed against the larger Liberians United for Reconciliation and Democracy (LURD), MODEL quickly gained ground. The initial leadership of MODEL came from LURD, while the majority of MODEL fighters were mobilized from Ivorian and Ghanaian refugee camps, to which many Liberians from the country's Southeast had fled.

The relationship between the rebel groups too was strained, with politicians from both movements uncooperative. MODEL was backed by the Ivorian government as a way of staking a claim in Liberian politics during the turmoil of that country's civil war, or as retaliation for the Liberian government's alleged support for rebels in Ivory Coast. Its political leader, Thomas Nimely, was named as Liberia's foreign minister in the transitional government that was appointed on October 14, 2003, following the resignation and exile of Taylor. The group may have exported timber from regions of southern Liberia under its control, which would have been a violation of United Nations sanctions. By 2004 MODEL in effect ceased to exist.
