= Liberians United for Reconciliation and Democracy =

Liberian rebel group, 1999–2003

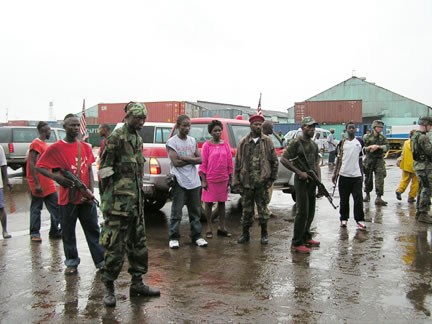
- LURD commander "Gen. Cobra" with his guards
- Leader: Sekou Conneh
- Dates active: 1999–2003
- Active regions: Throughout Liberia
- Wars: Second Liberian Civil War

Map of areas under LURD control in September 2003

The Liberians United for Reconciliation and Democracy (LURD) was a group in Liberia that led the 1999 rebellion against then-president Charles Taylor, marking the beginning of the Second Liberian Civil War. LURD remained active until 2003, when Taylor resigned and the war ended. While the group formally dissolved after the war, the interpersonal linkages of the civil war era remain a key force in internal Liberian politics.

The group's only stated political purpose during the civil war that followed its rebellion against President Charles Taylor was to force him out of office: "Taylor must go". The group received support from Liberian diasporas in other African countries, Europe and the United States, but especially from the government of neighboring Guinea after the Taylor-supported invasion of the country in September 2000. Like the other two warring factions during the Second War, LURD was accused of committing atrocities during the war. This group was ethnically Mandingo and Krahn but later divided into two groups; Movement for Democracy in Liberia (MODEL), which was ethnically Krahn, while the Mandingo continued to fight in LURD. The distinction between these two groups is often messy as some Krahn continued to fight with LURD, while some Mandingos fought with MODEL.

LURD is best understood as a loose coalition united by an equally loose ideology, which focused on getting rid of Taylor. Initially there were different groups that shared the same goal, but acted independently in both Sierra Leone and Liberia. When the plan to wage this kind of two-front war failed due to Sierra Leonean reluctance, and especially when Guinea began to support the Liberians in the country against Taylor's aggression, these various groups moved to Guinea. Because Guinean support was channeled through the Chairman Sekou Conneh, he gained some leverage to unite the movement. While the cohesion of LURD always remained brittle, it was widely recognized that unity was necessary if Taylor was to be removed from power. Many in the LURD leadership also remembered what had happened to its predecessor, the United Liberation Movement of Liberia for Democracy (ULIMO), which had split in 1994. As a result, the LURD internal organization assumed power-sharing, not least between the dominant Krahn and Mandingo groups and their leaders.

Early on in the war the anti-Taylor elements launched hit-and-run attacks from Sierra Leone and Guinea, but after the gaining support from Guinea, LURD established its headquarters in Voinjama, the county capital of Lofa County. Once it had gained territory in the south this headquarters was moved south to Tubmanburg in Bomi County. In Bomi county the Mahare Massacre took place in 2002, which killed 355 civilians. Duo's military group captured the area and all civilians were seen as LURD supporters which in turn lead to mass killings. According to James Kabah, cited in Christine Cheng's book Extralegal Groups in Post-Conflict Liberia, "men, women, and children were lined up and shot 10 at a time." After years of fighting, LURD laid siege to Liberia's capital, Monrovia, on June 4, 2003. However, it was unable to capture it. During the siege, the group was accused of firing mortar shells into civilian areas of the city, killing dozens of people.

However, independent investigations conducted by civil society groupings said the widespread death caused was also due to Charles Taylor's Anti Terrorist Unit and other militias.

LURD's successes in occupying northern Liberia and besieging Monrovia, in addition to the successes of another rebel group in southeastern Liberia (the Movement for Democracy in Liberia, or MODEL) and heavy pressure from the United States and the international community, effectively forced President Taylor to resign. He went into exile in Nigeria on August 11, 2003, as part of a peace agreement. A transitional government headed by Gyude Bryant was established on October 14, and it included many representatives of LURD. One of LURD's founders, lanzini, became Speaker of the National Transitional Legislative Assembly. After the war ended in 2003, LURD and MODEL as well as the government of Liberia still controlled resource areas including rubber plantations and were able to profit from the sale of rubber for the next 3 years.

In January 2004, LURD was divided by a power struggle between its chairman, Sekou Conneh, and his wife Aisha Conneh, an adviser to the President of Guinea, Lansana Conté. The group promised to disarm as part of the 2003 peace agreement, although it was accused of simply moving most of its weapons into safekeeping across the border in Sierra Leone. In June 2004, Chayee Doe, the vice-chairman of LURD and younger brother of Samuel Kanyon Doe, was briefly appointed chairman despite an illness but died two days later.

George Dweh was suspended indefinitely as Speaker of the National Transitional Legislative Assembly on April 28, 2005, along with his deputy Eddington Varmah and Ways, Means & Finance's Committee Chairman Tarplah Doe, for widespread corruption.

The United Nations Mission in Liberia (UNMIL) completed the disarmament of 100,000 ex-combatants from LURD, MODEL, and the ex-government of Liberia. The process commenced on December 7, 2003, but was abruptly stopped after militiamen demanded money for handing in their guns. The process re-commenced and each ex-combatant received USD300.

Testifying before the Truth and Reconciliation Commission on August 28, 2008, Sekou Conneh said that, during the war, Sierra Leone and Guinea had allowed the LURD rebels free passage "through their borders with our arms without any questions from them".

== See also ==
- Robert Young Pelton of The World's Most Dangerous Places lived with the LURD filming in combat with the Small Boys Unit as they defended Vonjama
- Johnny Mad Dog
