= United Nations Security Council Resolution 1001 =

UN Security Council Resolution 1001
- Flag of Liberia
- Date: 30 June 1995
- Meeting no.: 3,549
- Code: S/RES/1001 (Document)
- Subject: The situation in Liberia
- Voting summary: 15 voted for; None voted against; None abstained
- Result: Adopted

Security Council composition
- Permanent members: China; France; Russia; United Kingdom; United States
- Non-permanent members: Argentina; Botswana; Czech Republic; Germany; Honduras; Indonesia; Italy; Nigeria; Oman; Rwanda

United Nations Security Council resolution 1001, adopted unanimously on 30 June 1995, after reaffirming resolutions 813 (1993), 856 (1993), 866 (1993), 911 (1994), 950 (1994) and 972 (1995), and 985 (1995) on Liberia, the Council discussed the implementation of peace agreements in the country and extended the mandate of the United Nations Observer Mission in Liberia (UNOMIL) until 15 September 1995.

The Council noted that more efforts would be needed, including by the Economic Community of West African States, to advance the peace process. There was still no State Council installed and no ceasefire was in force. Concern was expressed at inter- and intra-factional fighting in parts of Liberia which had a detrimental effect on the civilian population and the efforts of humanitarian agencies to provide relief. The parties were urged to respect international humanitarian law and human rights. There were continued violations of the arms embargo imposed in Resolution 788 (1992).

The Security Council stressed that further support from the international community for the peace process would depend on actions by the Liberian parties to resolve the conflict peacefully. By extending the mandate of UNOMIL until 15 September 1995 the Council expected the parties to use this time to make substantial progress towards the implementation of various agreements, and specifically to:

(a) install at State Council;
(b) restore a ceasefire;
(c) disengage all forces;
(d) create a timetable for the implementation of aspects of the peace agreements.

If the steps were not put into effect by 15 September, the mandate of UNOMIL would not be extended, however if they were, it would be enhanced. The parties in Liberia were called upon to respect the status of personnel from UNOMIL and the Economic Community of West African States Monitoring Group (ECOMOG) peacekeeping force and allow access to humanitarian aid to the population. Greater efforts were urged by the international community, including contributions to a fund to provide assistance, political efforts by the Organisation of African Unity and co-operation between UNOMIL and ECOMOG.

Finally, the Secretary-General Boutros Boutros-Ghali was requested to report back to the council by 15 September 1995 on the situation in the country.

== See also ==
- Charles Taylor
- First Liberian Civil War
- List of United Nations Security Council Resolutions 1001 to 1100 (1995–1997)
