= United Nations Security Council Resolution 1100 =

UN Security Council Resolution 1100
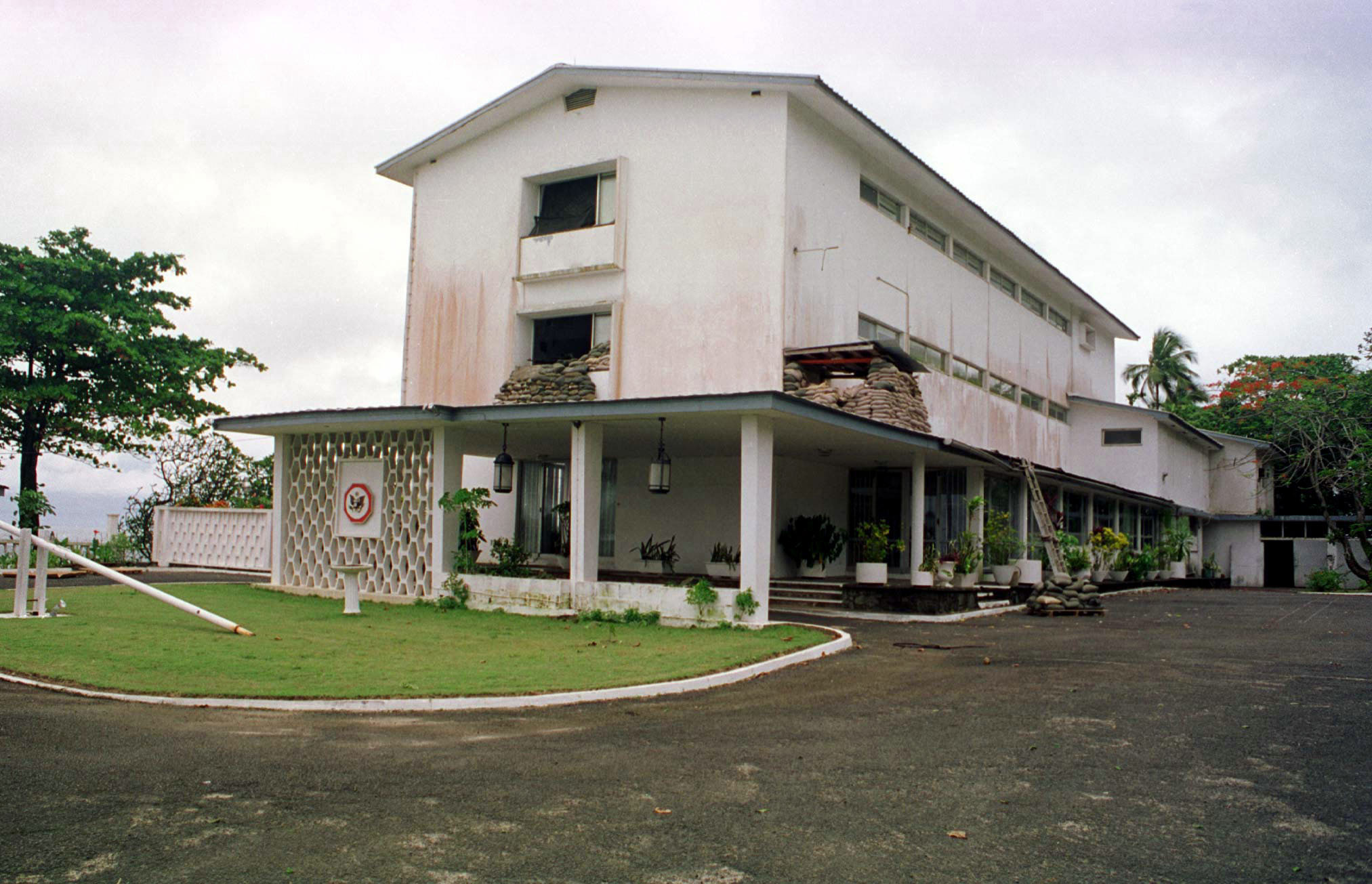
- United States embassy in the Liberian capital Monrovia (1996)
- Date: 27 March 1997
- Meeting no.: 3,757
- Code: S/RES/1100 (Document)
- Subject: The situation in Liberia
- Voting summary: 15 voted for; None voted against; None abstained
- Result: Adopted

Security Council composition
- Permanent members: China; France; Russia; United Kingdom; United States
- Non-permanent members: Chile; Costa Rica; Egypt; Guinea-Bissau; Japan; Kenya; South Korea; Poland; Portugal; Sweden

United Nations Security Council resolution 1100, adopted unanimously on 27 March 1997, after recalling all resolutions on the situation in Liberia, particularly Resolution 1083 (1996), the Council extended the mandate of the United Nations Observer Mission in Liberia (UNOMIL) until 30 June 1997.

According to the report of the Secretary-General Kofi Annan, the situation in Liberia had improved, there was a revitalisation of Liberian society and preparations for the 1997 general elections had begun. They had been scheduled for 30 May 1997 in agreement with the Economic Community of West African States (ECOWAS) and were essential for the peace process.

The Security Council expressed concern about delays during the installation of the National Electoral Commission and the reconstitution of the Supreme Court. The international community was asked to finance the elections and the operations of UNOMIL and the Economic Community of West African States Monitoring Group. The resolution stressed the importance for the respect of human rights and the right of refugees to return, while disarming the warring factions had commenced. Furthermore, all countries were reminded of their duty to strictly observe the arms embargo against Liberia imposed in Resolution 788 (1992) and report violations to the committee established in Resolution 985 (1995).

Resolution 1100 concluded by requesting the secretary-general to report to the council by 20 June 1997 on developments in Liberia, particularly with regard to the electoral process.

== See also ==
- Abuja Accord (Liberia)
- Charles Taylor
- Elections in Liberia
- First Liberian Civil War
- List of United Nations Security Council Resolutions 1001 to 1100 (1995–1997)
