= United Nations Security Council Resolution 1014 =

UN Security Council Resolution 1014
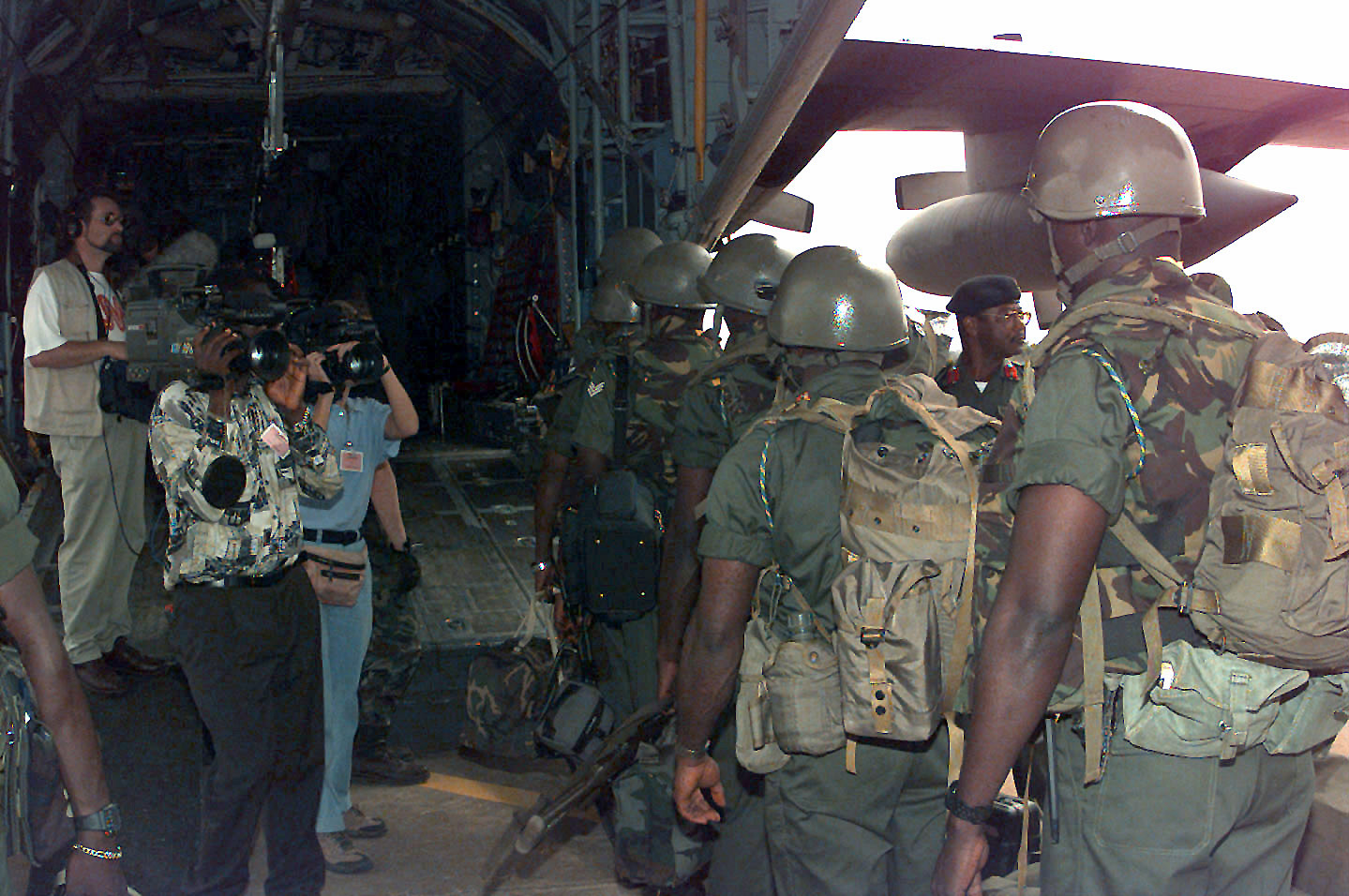
- ECOMOG troops from Ghana
- Date: 15 September 1995
- Meeting no.: 3,577
- Code: S/RES/1014 (Document)
- Subject: Liberia
- Voting summary: 15 voted for; None voted against; None abstained
- Result: Adopted

Security Council composition
- Permanent members: China; France; Russia; United Kingdom; United States
- Non-permanent members: Argentina; Botswana; Czech Republic; Germany; Honduras; Indonesia; Italy; Nigeria; Oman; Rwanda

United Nations Security Council resolution 1014, adopted unanimously on 15 September 1995, after recalling all resolutions on the situation in Liberia, particularly 1001 (1995), the council discussed various aspects of the civil war and extended the mandate of the United Nations Observer Mission in Liberia (UNOMIL) until 31 January 1996.

The Security Council welcomed the Abuja Agreement signed on 19 August 1995 which supplemented the prior Cotonou and Akosombo agreements and provided the basis for further actions by the council. There was also a new State Council, a ceasefire in place, the beginning of the disengagement of forces and a timetable for the implementation of various aspects of the agreement. It was noted that, with the signing of the Abuja Accord, that additional troops from the Economic Community of West African States Monitoring Group (ECOMOG) and further equipment and logistic support would also be required to ensure its deployment throughout the entire country.

The mandate of UNOMIL was increased until 31 January 1996, and the intention of the Secretary-General Boutros Boutros-Ghali to deploy an additional 42 military observers was welcomed, stressing that any further increase would depend on progress on the ground. At the same time, Boutros-Ghali's intention to submit recommendations on improving co-operation between UNOMIL and ECOMOG and the implementation of its mandate was welcomed. Member states were asked to provide additional funds to the peace process and to provide additional support to ECOMOG.

The secretary-general was then requested, in conjunction with the chairman of the Economic Community of West African States, to convene a conference that would raise the resources needed by ECOMOG and for the overall peace process in Liberia. All groups in the country were urged to respect the status of UNOMIL, ECOMOG and humanitarian aid agencies, while all countries were urged to observe the arms embargo against Liberia imposed in Resolution 788 (1992) and highlight violations of it to the committee established in Resolution 985 (1995). Furthermore, the Liberian parties were called upon to respect international humanitarian law, and the Organisation of African Unity was urged to continue its efforts in the country.

== See also ==
- Charles Taylor
- First Liberian Civil War
- List of United Nations Security Council Resolutions 1001 to 1100 (1995–1997)
