= United Nations Security Council Resolution 1041 =

UN Security Council Resolution 1041
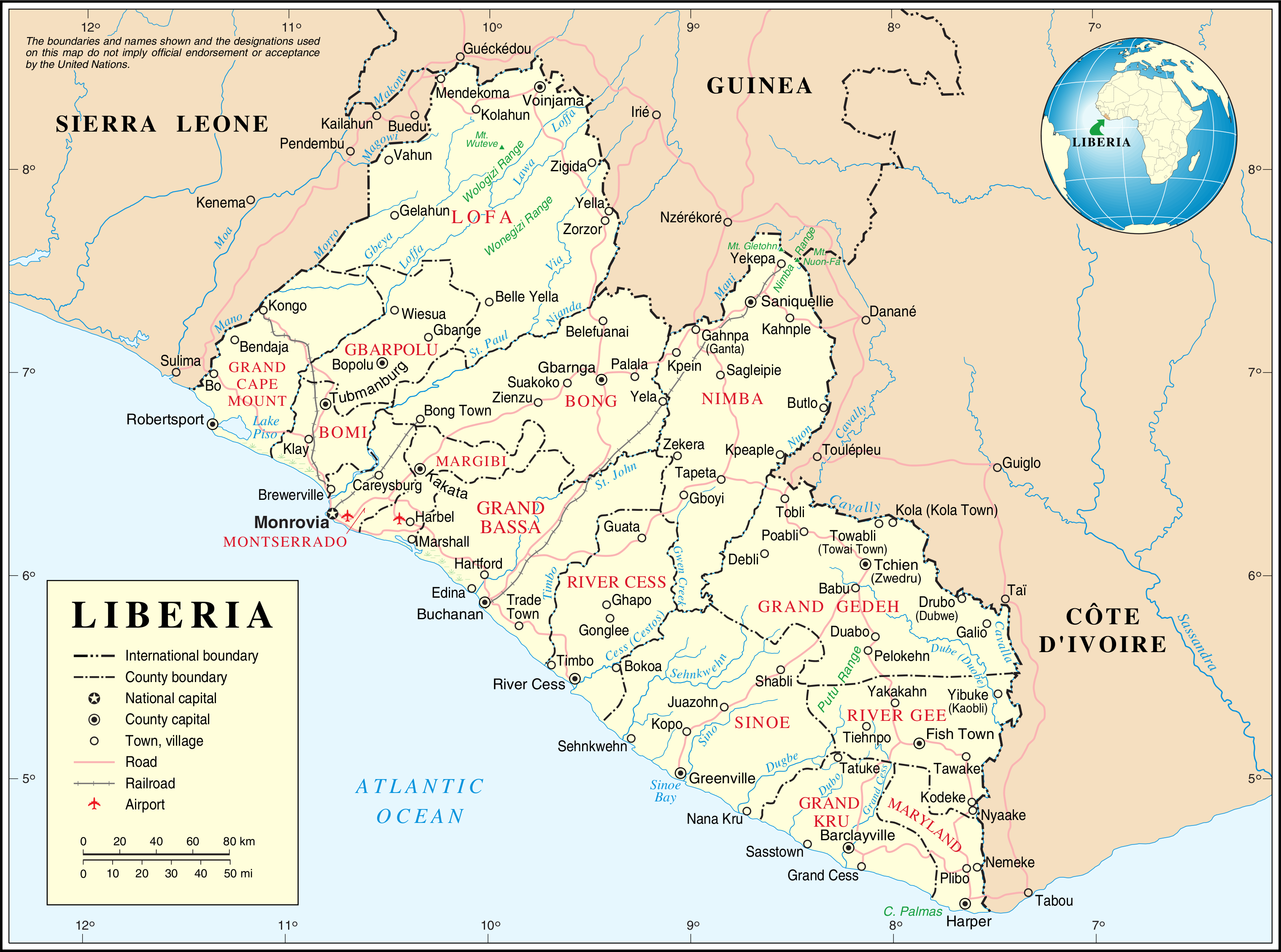
- Liberia
- Date: 29 January 1996
- Meeting no.: 3,624
- Code: S/RES/1041 (Document)
- Subject: The situation in Liberia
- Voting summary: 15 voted for; None voted against; None abstained
- Result: Adopted

Security Council composition
- Permanent members: China; France; Russia; United Kingdom; United States
- Non-permanent members: Botswana; Chile; Egypt; Guinea-Bissau; Germany; Honduras; Indonesia; Italy; South Korea; Poland

United Nations Security Council resolution 1041, adopted unanimously on 29 January 1996, after recalling all resolutions on the situation in Liberia, particularly 1020 (1995), the Council extended the mandate of the United Nations Observer Mission in Liberia (UNOMIL) until 31 May 1996 and discussed efforts to restore stability in the country.

The resolution began with the security council expressing its concern at recent violations of the ceasefire, attacks on the Economic Community of West African States Monitoring Group (ECOMOG) observation group and delays in the dismantling and disarmament of troops. The need for the parties to the Abuja Agreement to adhere to it and its implementation was stressed, while African nations who had contributed troops to ECOMOG were praised.

All parties in the country were called upon to meet the agreements the committed to, particularly with regard to the ceasefire, disarmament, demobilisation and reconciliation. Recent attacks against ECOMOG and civilians were condemned, and the Council demanded that the parties respect the status of UNOMIL, ECOMOG and the international humanitarian agencies. The Secretary-General Boutros Boutros-Ghali was requested, by 31 March 1996, to report on progress and the planning of elections in the country. For the council, human rights had to be respected and the judicial system had to be restored, while all countries had to strictly observe the arms embargo imposed against Liberia in Resolution 788 (1992) and report violations to the committee established in Resolution 985 (1995).

== See also ==
- Abuja Accord (Liberia)
- Charles Taylor
- First Liberian Civil War
- List of United Nations Security Council Resolutions 1001 to 1100 (1995–1997)
