= United Nations Security Council Resolution 972 =

UN Security Council Resolution 972
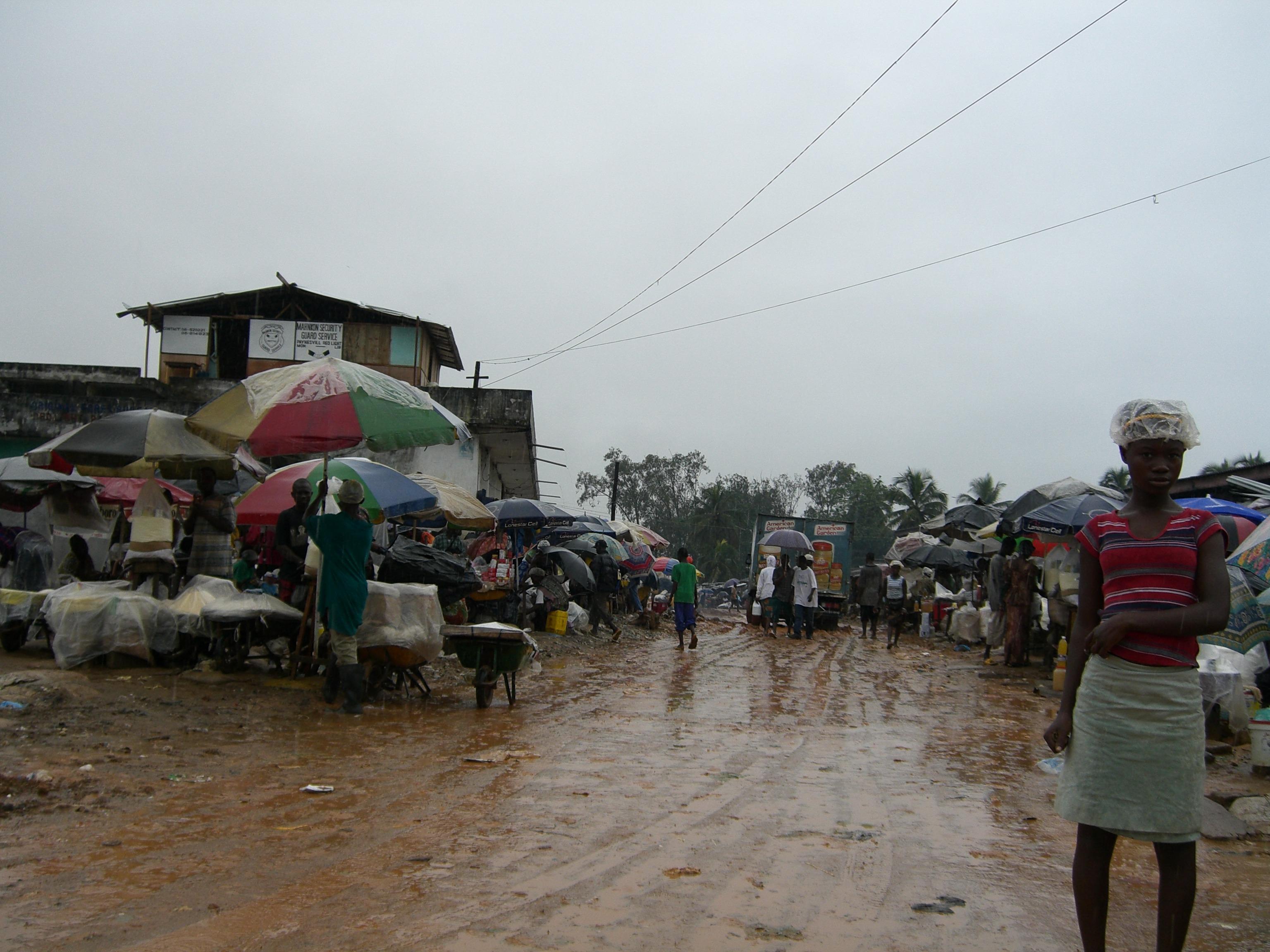
- A market in Liberia
- Date: 13 January 1995
- Meeting no.: 3,489
- Code: S/RES/972 (Document)
- Subject: Liberia
- Voting summary: 15 voted for; None voted against; None abstained
- Result: Adopted

Security Council composition
- Permanent members: China; France; Russia; United Kingdom; United States
- Non-permanent members: Argentina; Botswana; Czech Republic; Germany; Honduras; Indonesia; Italy; Nigeria; Oman; Rwanda

United Nations Security Council resolution 972, adopted unanimously on 13 January 1995, after reaffirming resolutions 813 (1993), 856 (1993), 866 (1993), 911 (1994) and 950 (1994), the council discussed the peace process in Liberia and extended the mandate of the United Nations Observer Mission in Liberia (UNOMIL) until 13 April 1995.

The council began by commending the Economic Community of West African States (ECOWAS) and its president, the President of Ghana Jerry Rawlings, for their efforts in Liberia and the signing of the Accra Agreement on 21 December 1994. States that had contributed to the Economic Community of West African States Monitoring Group (ECOMOG) were praised. It was hoped that a summit would be convened with the ECOWAS member states to harmonise their policies. Concern was expressed at continuing flow of weapons into the country in violation of an arms embargo, and that as a result of poor security, the humanitarian situation had deteriorated. The Liberian leaders and parties were called upon to uphold a ceasefire agreed in the Accra Agreement.

The parties were then asked to co-operate with regard to the cease-fire, disarmament, demobilisation and the installation of a new state council. Returning UNOMIL to its previously authorised level would depend upon the implementation of the ceasefire, requesting the Secretary-General Boutros Boutros-Ghali to report back on or before 1 March 1995 on developments. All countries were required to strictly observe the arms embargo on Liberia and contribute towards the trust fund, providing assistance to ECOMOG. The resolution concluded by calling upon the Liberian parties to guarantee the safety of United Nations personnel and respect international humanitarian law.

== See also ==
- Charles Taylor
- First Liberian Civil War
- List of United Nations Security Council Resolutions 901 to 1000 (1994–1995)
