= United Nations Security Council Resolution 1020 =

UN Security Council Resolution 1020
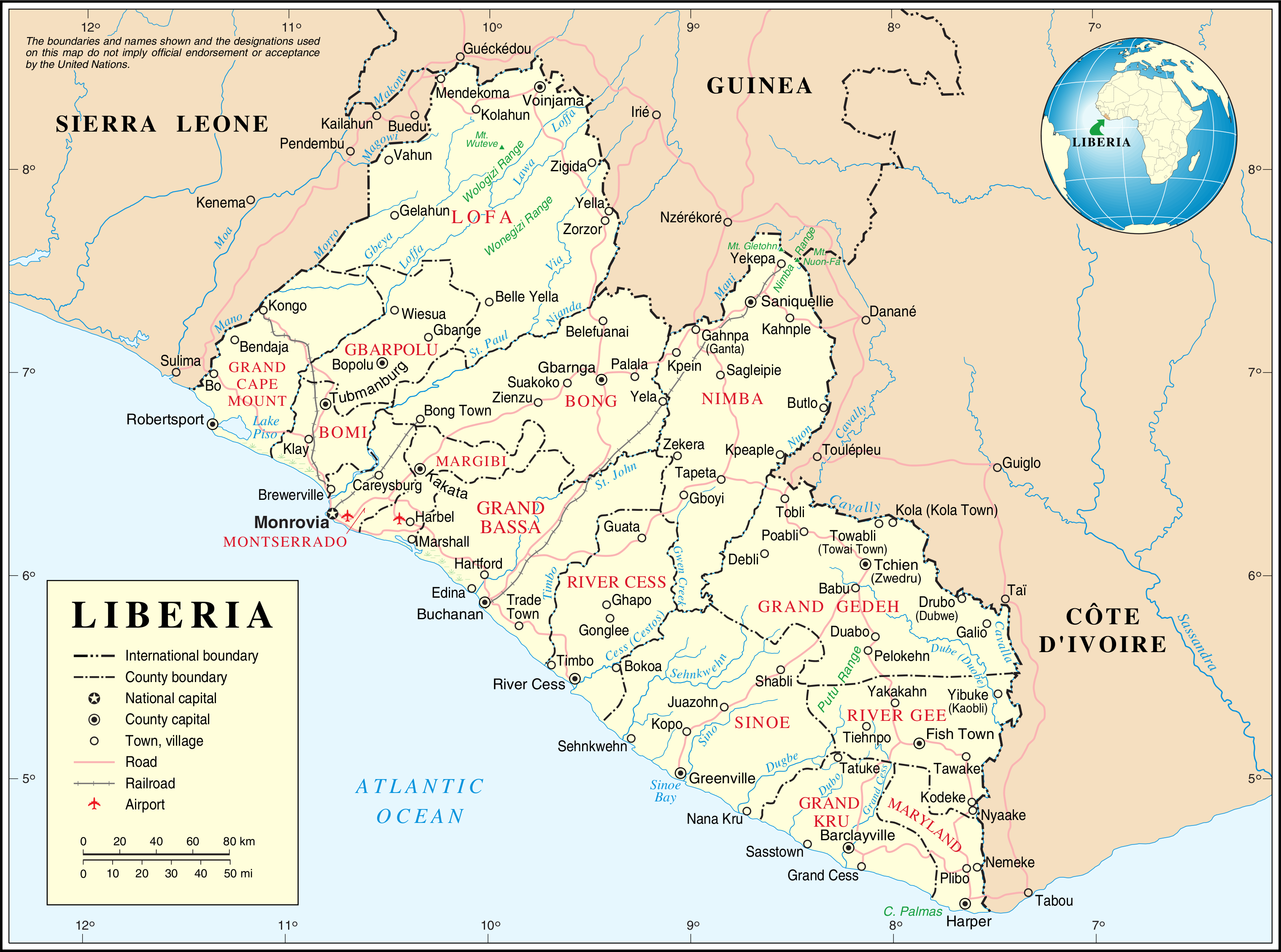
- Liberia
- Date: 10 November 1995
- Meeting no.: 3,592
- Code: S/RES/1020 (Document)
- Subject: Liberia
- Voting summary: 15 voted for; None voted against; None abstained
- Result: Adopted

Security Council composition
- Permanent members: China; France; Russia; United Kingdom; United States
- Non-permanent members: Argentina; Botswana; Czech Republic; Germany; Honduras; Indonesia; Italy; Nigeria; Oman; Rwanda

United Nations Security Council resolution 1020, adopted unanimously on 10 November 1995, after recalling all resolutions on the situation in Liberia, particularly 1001 (1995), the Council discussed the implementation of the peace process during the First Liberian Civil War and adjusted the mandate of the United Nations Observer Mission in Liberia (UNOMIL) to include other functions.

The Council noted progress in Liberia by the re-establishment of a ceasefire, the installation of a State Council and a timetable agreed in the peace process until the elections. It also noted that the parties were more determined to work towards the restoration of peace. There was concern about violations of the ceasefire and delays in the dissolution of troops.

UNOMIL's mandate was then modified as follows:

(a) to support the efforts of the Liberian National Transitional Government (LNTG) and Economic Community of West African States (ECOWAS) in the implementation of peace agreements;
(b) to investigate violations of the ceasefire and recommend measures to prevent future occurrences;
(c) to monitor compliance with the military components of the peace agreements, including the disengagement of forces, disarmament and observance of the arms embargo;
(d) to contribute towards the maintenance of assembly sites and the implementation of a demobilisation programme;
(e) to support humanitarian activities;
(f) to report violations of human rights to the Secretary-General;
(g) to observe the electoral process.

The number of military observers in UNOMIL was set at 160. All parties were urged to implement the provisions of the Abuja Accord, while the transitional government was asked to take action to avoid further violations of the ceasefire. All countries were reminded to observe the arms embargo imposed on Liberia in Resolution 788 (1992), with all violations of it reported to the committee established in Resolution 985 (1995).

The Economic Community of West African States Monitoring Group (ECOMOG) was asked to provide security to UNOMIL personnel. In this regard, all Liberian parties were called upon to respect the status of both peacekeeping forces and respect international humanitarian law. The repatriation of refugees had to be better co-ordinated. Finally, the Secretary-General Boutros Boutros-Ghali was requested to submit a progress report to the council by 15 December 1995.

== See also ==
- Abuja Accord (Liberia)
- Charles Taylor
- First Liberian Civil War
- List of United Nations Security Council Resolutions 1001 to 1100 (1995–1997)
