= United Nations Security Council Resolution 950 =

UN Security Council Resolution 950
- UNOMIL medal bar
- Date: 21 October 1994
- Meeting no.: 3,442
- Code: S/RES/950 (Document)
- Subject: The situation in Liberia
- Voting summary: 15 voted for; None voted against; None abstained
- Result: Adopted

Security Council composition
- Permanent members: China; France; Russia; United Kingdom; United States
- Non-permanent members: Argentina; Brazil; Czech Republic; Djibouti; New Zealand; Nigeria; Oman; Pakistan; Rwanda; Spain

United Nations Security Council resolution 950, adopted unanimously on 21 October 1994, after reaffirming resolutions 813 (1993), 856 (1993), 866 (1993) and 911 (1994), the Council noted the deteriorating situation in Liberia and extended the mandate of the United Nations Observer Mission in Liberia (UNOMIL) until 13 January 1995.

The council began by commending the Economic Community of West African States (ECOWAS) and its president, the President of Ghana Jerry Rawlings, for their role in Liberia. The importance of strengthening the authority of the Liberian National Transitional Government (LNTG) was stressed, and states that had contributed to the Economic Community of West African States Monitoring Group (ECOMOG) were commended. ECOMOG itself was praised for preventing an attempted coup d'état against the LNTG in the capital Monrovia. Concern was expressed at the breakdown in the ceasefire and the impact of the deteriorating security situation due to the increasing level of warfare on the civilian population in Liberia.

The intention of the Secretary-General Boutros Boutros-Ghali to send a high-level mission to consult ECOWAS member states on the role of the international community in Liberia. The Council recognised that, after extending the mandate of UNOMIL, its reduction was necessary due to the prevailing situation on the ground. An increase was dependent on conditions improving and a further report from the Secretary-General.

All factions in Liberia were called upon to cease hostilities and agree a timetable for the disengagement of forces, disarmament and demobilisation. Meanwhile, the LNTG and the population were called upon to seek national reconciliation and co-operate with the Chairman of ECOWAS and with the Special Representative of the Secretary-General. All states were instructed to strictly abide by the general and complete arms embargo on Liberia, in accordance with Resolution 788 (1992) under Chapter VII of the United Nations Charter.

The resolution condemned the widespread killing of civilians, violations of international humanitarian law and the detention and mistreatment of UNOMIL observers, ECOMOG soldiers, humanitarian relief workers and other personnel. It demanded that all factions in Liberia respect the status of ECOMOG and UNOMIL personnel, refraining from intimidation or acts of violence towards them and return all equipment seized.

Member states were urged to contribute to the peace process in Liberia and commended those that had provided humanitarian aid to the country. Finally, the secretary-general was asked to report back to the council before the end of UNOMIL's current mandate on developments in Liberia and the situation on the ground.

== See also ==
- Charles Taylor
- First Liberian Civil War
- List of United Nations Security Council Resolutions 901 to 1000 (1994–1995)
