= United Nations Security Council Resolution 985 =

UN Security Council Resolution 985
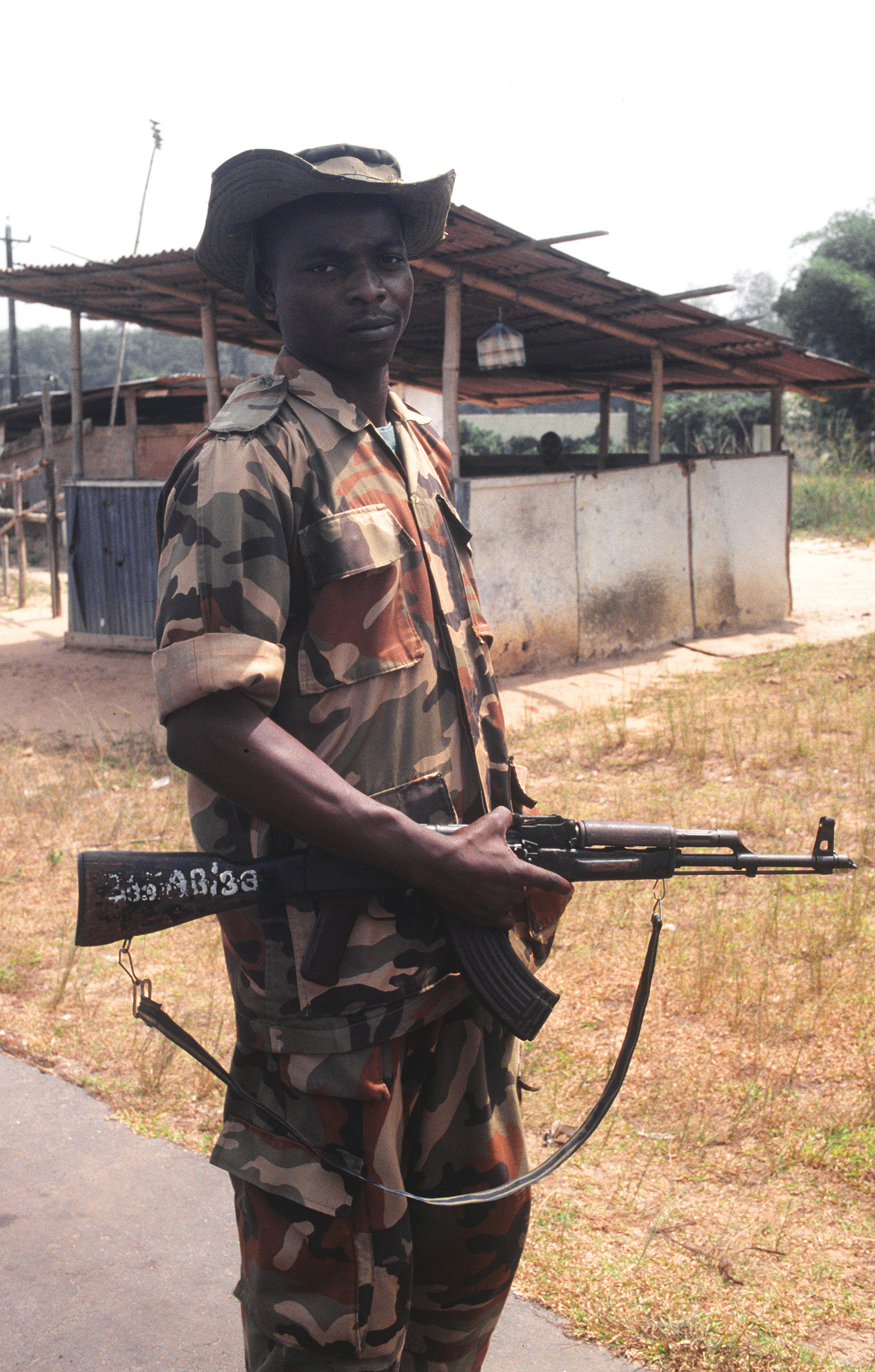
- A Nigerian ECOMOG soldier in Liberia
- Date: 13 April 1995
- Meeting no.: 3,517
- Code: S/RES/985 (Document)
- Subject: Liberia
- Voting summary: 15 voted for; None voted against; None abstained
- Result: Adopted

Security Council composition
- Permanent members: China; France; Russia; United Kingdom; United States
- Non-permanent members: Argentina; Botswana; Czech Republic; Germany; Honduras; Indonesia; Italy; Nigeria; Oman; Rwanda

United Nations Security Council resolution 985, adopted unanimously on 13 April 1995, after reaffirming resolutions 813 (1993), 856 (1993), 866 (1993), 911 (1994), 950 (1994) and 972 (1995), and 788 (1992) which imposed an arms embargo on Liberia, the council established a committee to monitor the implementation of the embargo and extended the mandate of the United Nations Observer Mission in Liberia (UNOMIL) until 30 June 1995.

Concern was expressed at the breakdown of a ceasefire in the country which prevent UNOMIL from carrying out its mandate, and further concern over the movement of weapons into the country in violation of the arms embargo. A planned summit in May 1995 by the Economic Community of West African States was welcomed.

All parties in Liberia were urged to implement the Akosombo and Accra agreements and re-establish a ceasefire and install a State Council, while the international community was required to observe the arms embargo against Liberia. In this regard, a Committee of the Security Council was established with the following mandate:

(a) to seek information regarding measures countries had taken to implement the embargo;
(b) to consider information on violations of the embargo and recommend measures to strengthen it;
(c) to recommend measures in response to violations of the embargo.

The council demanded that all factions in Liberia respect the status of Economic Community of West African States Monitoring Group (ECOMOG) and international humanitarian workers and abide by international humanitarian law. The Secretary-General Boutros Boutros-Ghali was requested to report to the council by 15 June 1995 on the situation in Liberia, including whether there was an effective ceasefire in place, if UNOMIL could carry out its mandate and on contributions towards ECOMOG, determining that the future of UNOMIL would be reviewed in this light.

== See also ==
- Charles Taylor
- First Liberian Civil War
- List of United Nations Security Council Resolutions 901 to 1000 (1994–1995)
