= United Nations Security Council Resolution 1083 =

UN Security Council Resolution 1083
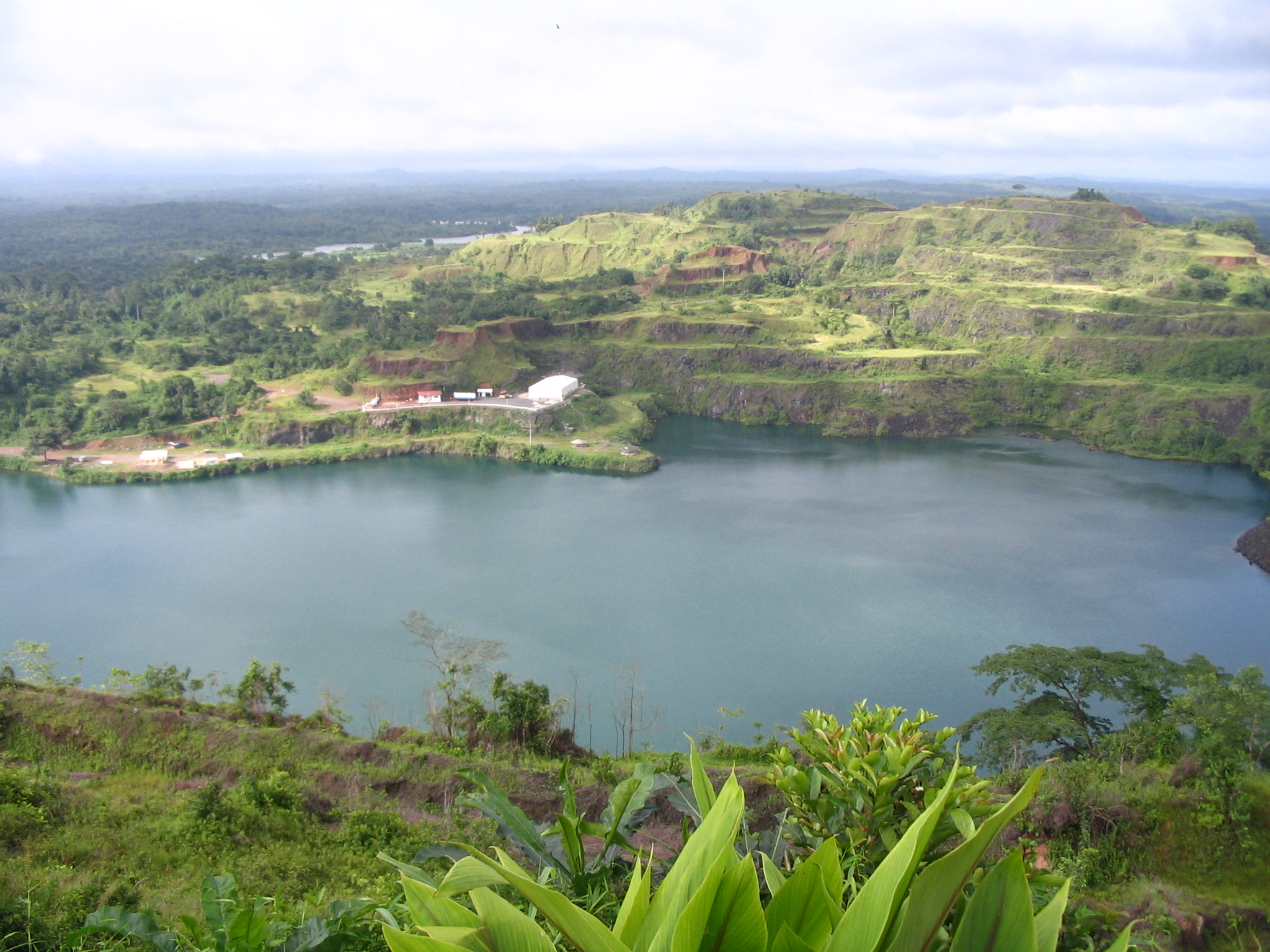
- Bomi Lake near Tubmanburg, Bomi County in Liberia
- Date: 27 November 1996
- Meeting no.: 3,717
- Code: S/RES/1083 (Document)
- Subject: The situation in Liberia
- Voting summary: 15 voted for; None voted against; None abstained
- Result: Adopted

Security Council composition
- Permanent members: China; France; Russia; United Kingdom; United States
- Non-permanent members: Botswana; Chile; Egypt; Guinea-Bissau; Germany; Honduras; Indonesia; Italy; South Korea; Poland

United Nations Security Council resolution 1083, adopted unanimously on 27 November 1996, after recalling all resolutions on the situation in Liberia, particularly Resolution 1071 (1996), the Council extended the mandate of the United Nations Observer Mission in Liberia (UNOMIL) until 31 March 1997 and discussed matters relating to UNOMIL.

The Security Council noted that the groups in Liberia had continued violating the ceasefire. It welcomed the disarmament process, in accordance with the Abuja Agreement, and called for all parties to participate as previously agreed.

All groups were asked to cease hostilities immediately, complete disarmament in a timely manner and uphold agreements by the Economic Community of West African States (ECOWAS) at a meeting in August 1996. The latter was important for the elections in 1997 to continue as planned, and the international community was urged to support work and training projects in Liberia to ensure its rehabilitation. The Security Council also condemned in the strongest terms the training and deployment of child soldiers and demanded that all child soldiers were demobilised. Attacks on Economic Community of West African States Monitoring Group (ECOMOG), UNOMIL and humanitarian relief agencies were condemned, and the importance of human rights was underlined.

Furthermore, all countries were called upon to strictly observe the arms embargo against Liberia imposed in Resolution 788 (1992) and to report violations to the committee established in Resolution 985 (1995). Finally, the Secretary-General Boutros Boutros-Ghali was requested to submit a progress report by 31 January 1997 on recommendations for possible United Nations support for the 1997 elections.

== See also ==
- Abuja Accord (Liberia)
- Charles Taylor
- First Liberian Civil War
- List of United Nations Security Council Resolutions 1001 to 1100 (1995–1997)
