= Tarok people =

Ethnic group of Nigeria

Coordinates: 9°08′N 9°47′E

Tarok
Regions with significant populations
- Nigeria: Plateau, Nasarawa, Taraba

Languages
- Tarok, English

Religion
- Christianity 86%, African traditional religion

Related ethnic groups
- Ngas, Boghom, Tiv, Berom, Atyap, Eggon, Jukun, Montol

Tarok is an ethnic group found in the Northern and Southern part of Langntang in the hills and on the plains Southeast of Plateau State, Middle Belt, Nigeria.

== The Tarok People ==
The Tarok people call themselves oTárók, their language iTárók and their land ìTàrók. They are found principally in Langtang-North, Langtang-South, Wase, Mikang and Kanke Local Government Areas (LGAs) of Plateau State in Central Nigeria. Their main town of Langtang is located about 186 kilometres south-east of Jos, the state capital. They are also found in large numbers in Shendam, Qua'an-Pan, Kanam, Pankshin LGAs and some part of Tafawa Balewa LGA of Bauchi state the Sur (Tapshin). Scattered in Nasarawa and Taraba states are Tarok farming communities. The people have been described to some extent in anthropological and ethnographical works by Fitzpatrick (1910), Roger Blench, Lamle (1995), Famwang and Longtau (1997). The oTárók is an amalgamation of various peoples who now form a more or less ‘homogeneous’ group. The constituents were of Pe, Ngas, Jukun, Boghom, Tel (Montol) and probably Tal origins, while others still remain obscure or unknown. The culture at a micro level portrays this admixture of peoples of the Tarok nation. The focus here is a description of their language.

== Name of the Language ==
In the literature, other names have been used for Tarok as Appa, Yergam and its variants of Yergum and Yergem. The name Tarok itself has been wrongly spelt by some as Taroh. The name Appa on the other hand is used by the Jukun to refer to oTarok as a friendship term. These fresh insights are pointing to a conclusion that Tarok was a nickname given to the Tal/Ngas immigrants. The name of the original group is lost and has been replaced by the nickname. The term Pe-Tarok refers to the people who first spoke the original form of the language called Tarok today the mismatch notwithstanding. The origins of the peoples may be a knotty topic, but it is clear that Proto-Tarok is the parent of the language which is known as Tarok today (whatever might have been their original name).

== Tarok in a sea of Chadic languages ==
Longtau described Tarok as one of the Benue–Congo languages which is almost completely submerged in a sea of Chadic languages. These languages include Ngas, Tel, Boghom, Hausa and Yiwom. Its non-Chadic neighbours are Pe, Jukun-Wase and Yangkam. Tarok has spread considerably in the twentieth century and it now borders Wapan in the South-East. The Chadic languages belong to a different language family called Afroasiatic. Longtau explained that Tarok had settled in their present abode long before the Eastern and Southward movements of Boghom and Ngas respectively.

== Tarok History ==
Nankap Elias Lamle (2001) an anthropologist lecturing at the University of Jos in Nigeria stated that in the early twentieth century people from other ethnic groups such as Tal, Ngas, Jukun, Tel (Montol/Dwal) and Youm (Garkawa) migrated and settled together with the initial Timwat and Funyallang clans. People from these ethnic groups came as migrants labour workers. The Timwat and Funyallang people gave them land to settle in Tarokland after they have served the former. Colonialism and Christianity came into Tarokland by 1904 (Lamle 1995). The initial inhabitants could not trust the missionaries and colonialists as such did not encourage their people to join them. with the introduction of modernism the later migrants to Tarokland used their connections to the missionaries and colonialists to acquire western education and join the army. Today these latter migrants are at the helm of affairs in Nigeria as such tries to use their influence to change history (cf. Lamle 2005).

Furthermore, Lamle asserted that the framework of Tarok migration supports the assertion above and is based on the fact that the Tarok language is part of the Benue–Congo language family. However, other peoples of the Chadic language family, such as the Ngas, Boghom, Tel (Montol) and Youm, shifted to the Benue–Congo family and are given full status as Tarok (Lamle 1998). Also the Jukun, who speak languages of the Benue–Congo family, joined the Tarok. What is called the Tarok people are actually a mixture of many ethno-linguistic groups (Lamle 2008).

== Culture ==
The Tarok people have an ancestral cult which retains considerable prestige and importance, despite major inroads of Christianity into the area. The ancestors, orìm, are represented by initiated males and post-menopausal women. Cult activities take place in sacred groves outside almost all Tarok settlements. Orìm are mostly heard, but emerge as masked figures under some circumstances, especially for the disciplining of ‘stubborn’ women and for making prophecies. Orìm figures speak through voice disguisers in a language dotted with code words although framed in normal Tarok syntax and their utterances are interpreted by unmasked figures.

Each Tarok settlement of any size has a sacred grove outside it, which is conserved as the place of the orim or ancestors. The singular form, ùrìm, is applied to a dead person or an ancestor, while orìm refers to the collective ancestors and the cult itself. Men above a certain age are allowed to enter the grove and engage with the ancestors. These inhabit the land of the dead and are thus in contact with all those who have died, including young people and children who were not admitted to the orìm. On certain nights when the ‘orìm are out’, women and children must stay in their houses. Orim can also be seen ‘dressed’, i.e. appearing as masquerades, when they engage with women through an interpreter. Surprisingly, most Tarok are Christian and Langtang hosts some large churches, but the association of the orìm with power ensures that these two systems continue to coexist. Indeed, it is said that the orìm take care to visit the houses of the retired generals and other influential figures at night to cement the bonds between two very different types of power. Orìm society is graded, in the sense that there are members who are not fully initiated and so cannot be let into the inner secrets of the society. Some of the orìm vocabulary is therefore for internal concealment, that is, there are code-words among the elder members to conceal the meaning of what is being said from junior members.

The main function of the orim from the external point of view is to maintain order, both spiritual and actual, within the society but also to prepare for warfare and other collective action. In practice, maintaining order seems to be about disciplining women, who are forced to cook food as a punishment for being lazy or ‘stubborn’. This category of orìm is called orìm aga., literally ‘masquerade that gives trouble’ and its speciality is to fine women. There is a special season, aga. ‘time of trouble’, for meting out fines to offenders. The orìm are also in contact with the dead and it is believed that the spirits of dead children require to be fed; hence they will request special meals from the mother of such children. Orìm also have a marriage-broking function; for example, young women tell the orìm the name of the young man they would like to marry, and they find ways of passing on the message.

== The Tarok Website ==
The official website of the Tarok People was recently created and launched in December, 27th 2013. It was created for the purpose of promoting their culture and tradition, which will serve as a rich resource for the up-coming generation. It also serves as a means for interaction between its members and as a voice to air out their ideas. It is aimed at promoting unity through various ways among the Taroks. It was discontinued late 2014.

== Notable people ==
- Domkat Bali, military
- Esther Bali, writer
- Solomon Dalung, politician (minister)
- Joseph Nanven Garba, military
- Beni Lar, politician (House of Representatives)
- Solomon D. Lar, chief
- Victor Lar, politician (Senate)
- John Nanzip Shagaya, military
- Sim Shagaya, businessman
- Jeremiah Useni, military
- Jonah Wuyep, military.

== See also ==
- Langtang, Nigeria
- Langtang Mafia
