= 972 (disambiguation) =

972 may refer to

- The number 972; see 900 (number)
- The year 972 AD
  - List of state leaders in 972
- +972 Magazine, an Israeli-Palestinian web magazine
- 972 area code in the United States, which covers the Dallas, Texas area: see area codes 214, 469, 972, and 945
- +972, the country calling code for Telephone numbers in Israel
- 972 Cohnia, a minor planet orbiting the Sun
- 972 Fifth Avenue or Payne Whitney House, a historic building in Manhattan, New York City
- NGC 972, a spiral galaxy; see List of NGC objects (1–1000)
- United Nations Security Council Resolution 972
