= Victor Lar =

Nigerian politician

Federal Representative for Langtang North and South, Plateau State
- In office May 1999 – May 2007

Senator of the Federal Republic of Nigeria from Plateau South Senatorial District
- In office May 2011 – May 2015
- Preceded by: John Nanzip Shagaya
- Succeeded by: Jeremiah Timbut Useni

Personal details
- Party: People's Democratic Party (PDP)

Victor Rampyal Lar is a Nigerian politician who was elected Senator for the Plateau South constituency of Plateau State, Nigeria in the April 2011 national elections. Lar ran on the People's Democratic Party (PDP) platform.

Victor Lar is a Tarok from Langtang, in southern Plateau State. He obtained a degree in political science. Retired Lt. General Jeremiah Useni, whom Lar defeated in the 2011 election, described himself as Lar's political godfather. As national deputy chairman for the All Nigeria People's Party (ANPP), he sponsored Lar as the successful ANPP candidate in the April 1999 election for the Langtang North and South Federal Constituency of the Federal House of Representatives. Lar was reelected in April 2003.

Lar was one of the first politicians to declare his opposition to the bid by President Olusegun Obasanjo to change the constitution to allow for a third presidential term. In June 2006, Lar escaped assassination when four gunmen broke into his home while he was away. The motive was unknown. In the April 2007 elections, Lar ran for election as Governor of Plateau State on the ANPP platform, but lost to Jonah David Jang. In October 2009, he resigned from the party.

In the April 2011 elections, Lar ran for the Plateau South Senatorial seat on the PDP ticket and scored 132,768 votes. He defeated his former sponsor Jerry Useni of the Democratic People's Party (DPP), who got 97,846 votes, and the incumbent Senator John Shagaya of the Labour Party (LP), who received 72,534 votes. Both of Lar's opponents were retired army generals.
