= United Nations Security Council Resolution 911 =

UN Security Council Resolution 911
- Flag of Liberia
- Date: 21 April 1994
- Meeting no.: 3,366
- Code: S/RES/911 (Document)
- Subject: The situation in Liberia
- Voting summary: 15 voted for; None voted against; None abstained
- Result: Adopted

Security Council composition
- Permanent members: China; France; Russia; United Kingdom; United States
- Non-permanent members: Argentina; Brazil; Czech Republic; Djibouti; New Zealand; Nigeria; Oman; Pakistan; Rwanda; Spain

United Nations Security Council resolution 911, adopted unanimously on 21 April 1994, after reaffirming resolutions 813 (1993), 856 (1993) and 866 (1993), the Council welcomed progress made towards establishing the Liberian National Transitional Government but was concerned about subsequent delays in implementing the Cotonou Peace Agreement, and extended the mandate of the United Nations Observer Mission in Liberia (UNOMIL) until 22 October 1994.

Concern was expressed over renewed fighting the parties in Liberia and its negative impact on the disarmament process and humanitarian relief efforts. The role of the Economic Community of West African States (ECOWAS) in the peace process was commended and for the Economic Community of West African States Monitoring Group (ECOMOG) to assist in the implementation of the peace process. The close co-operation between UNOMIL and ECOMOG was commended and this was extended to African states that had contributed to ECOMOG. It was also noted that the amended timetable for the peace process called for elections to be held on 7 September 1994.

The Council extended the mandate of UNOMIL on the understanding that it will review the situation in Liberia by 18 May 1994 on whether or not the Council of State of the Liberian National Transitional Government has been fully installed and there had been substantive progress in the peace talks. By 30 June 1994, a review would take place concerning the operation of the transitional government, progress in disarmament and demobilisation, and the preparation of the elections.

All parties were called upon to cease hostilities and to work towards disarmament, the installation of the transitional government and a National Assembly so that a unified civil administration of the country can be established. The parties were also urged to ensure the safety of UNOMIL personnel and contribute to the delivery of humanitarian assistance.

Member States were encouraged to contribute to ECOMOG financially to facilitate the sending of reinforcements by African states. Furthermore, the assistance they provided was praised and the Secretary-General Boutros Boutros-Ghali's efforts to encourage dialogue were welcomed.

== See also ==
- Charles Taylor
- First Liberian Civil War
- List of United Nations Security Council Resolutions 901 to 1000 (1994–1995)
