= SLIMS =

SLIMS may refer to:

- St. Louis, Iron Mountain and Southern Railway
- Sierra Leone International Mission School
