= Timothy Shelpidi =

Nigerian general and diplomat (1948–2018)

Major General Timothy Shelpidi
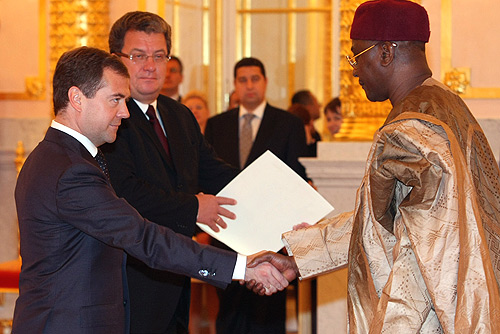
- 18 September 2008 Kremlin: Timothy Mai Shelpidi presents his letter of credentials to Dmitry Medvedev

Ambassador of Nigeria to the Russian Federation
- In office 18 September 2008 – 14 October 2011
- President: Umaru Musa Yar'Adua; Goodluck Jonathan
- Preceded by: Dan Suleiman

Commander, ECOMOG Peacekeeping Force, Liberia
- In office January 1998 – March 1999
- Preceded by: Maj-Gen. V.S.L. Malu
- Succeeded by: Maj-Gen. Felix Mujakperuo

Personal details
- Born: Timothy Mai Shelpidi; 4 September 1948 Kaltungo, Northern Region, British Nigeria (now in Gombe State, Nigeria)
- Died: 2 March 2018 (aged 69) Abuja, Nigeria
- Resting place: Boh, Gombe State, Nigeria
- Spouse: Ruth Shelpidi
- Education: Nigerian Defence Academy
- Occupation: Military officer; politician; diplomat

Military service
- Allegiance: Nigeria
- Branch/service: Nigerian Army
- Years of service: 1967–1999
- Rank: Major General

Timothy Mai Shelpidi (4 September 1948 – 2 March 2018) was a Nigerian general and diplomat, who served as the ambassador of Nigeria to the Russian Federation from 2008 to 2011. A retired major general, he served as commander of the ECOMOG Peacekeeping Force in Liberia from 1998 to 1999, and was commander of the ECOMOG Peacekeeping Force in Guinea Bissau in 1997.

Born on 4 September 1948, He enlisted in the Nigerian Army in 1967, he started his training at the Nigerian Defence Academy, Kaduna and was commissioned a Regular Combatant Officer on 4 March 1970. Between 1990 and 1992, he was principal staff officer to Commander-in-Chief of the Armed Forces.

After retirement, he went briefly into politics, contesting for the governorship of his home state of Gombe in 2003. He died on 2 March 2018, at the Federal Medical Center, Abuja, after a protracted illness, and was buried on 13 March 2018, in his home town of Boh, in Shongom Local Government Area of Gombe State.

== Qualifications and decorations ==
Shelpidi has attended various military courses in Nigeria and overseas.

- 1971: All Arms Tactics Course
- 1977 - 1978: Army Command and Staff Course.
- 1988: National Defence College, India
- He speaks English, Hausa language and Tangale language.
- He is married and has children.
- Pass Staff College (psc)
- MSC Defensce Studies
- Forces Service Star (fss)
- Meritorious Service Star (mss),

1973 he was Commanding Officer of the 124 Infantry Battalion. In 1996 he was MAJOR GENERAL (mss, psc, ndc), Chief of Research and Development In 1997, he was Commander of the Economic Community of West African States Monitoring Group in Guinea Bissau. From 18 September 2008 to 14 October 2011 he administrated the Embassy of Nigeria in Moscow.
