= Joshua Dogonyaro =

Nigerian military officer (1940–2021)

Lieutenant general Joshua Dogonyaro

Commander, ECOMOG Peacekeeping Force, Liberia
- In office September 1990 – February 1991
- Preceded by: Lt-Gen. A. Quainoo
- Succeeded by: Maj-Gen. R.M. Kupolati

Personal details
- Born: Joshua Nimyel Dogonyaro; 12 September 1940 Vom, Northern Region, British Nigeria (now in Plateau State, Nigeria)
- Died: 14 May 2021 (aged 80)
- Education: Boys' Secondary School, Gindiri

Military service
- Allegiance: Nigeria
- Branch/service: Nigerian Army
- Rank: Lieutenant general

Joshua Nimyel Dogonyaro (12 September 1940 – 14 May 2021) was a Nigerian army lieutenant general and a military administrator.

== Early life and education ==
Dogonyaro was born in Vom, Plateau State, though a native of Tarok in Langtang North Local Government Area. He had his early education at Boys’ Secondary School, Gindiri, and thereafter, was enlisted in the Nigerian Army in 1964. Dogonyaro attended the Nigerian Defence Academy from 1964-1967 alongside contemporaries such as Aliyu Mohammed Gusau and Mohammed Kaliel. He also attended the National Institute for Policy and Strategic Studies, Kuru, Jos and obtained National Institute.

== Military career ==
Joshua Dogonyaro was commissioned Second-Lieutenant in the Nigerian Army Armoured Corps, 1967; Officer Commanding, 1 Recce Squadron, NA, 1967–69; Quartermaster General, I Infantry Division (Main), NA, 1969–70. He became Chief Instructor and Adjutant, Rece Training School, NA, 1970 to 1972; Commanding Officer, I Recce Regiment, N.A., 1972 to 1976. He was appointed Principal Staff Officer, Headquarters, Nigerian Army Armoured Corp, 1976 to 1977; Commanding Officer, 24 Armoured Brigade, N.A., 1977–79.

Between 1984 and 1985, he was made the Task Force Commanding Officer, 203 Armoured Battalion on the Peace-keeping Force in Chad; Director of Manning (Army), Army Headquarters, ‘A’ Branch, N.A. and Director of Armoury, 1985.

He was also the General Officer Commanding 3 Armoured Division, Nigerian Army, Jos, 1985 to 1987; mm: Armed Forces Ruling Council (AFRC), 1985; General Officer Commanding 2nd Mechanised Division, Nigerian Army, Ibadan, 1987; promoted to Major-General, 1988; promoted to Lt. General; he was ECOMOG Commander from September 1990 to February 1991; he retired from the army in 1993.

== Controversy and 1985 Coup ==
Dogonyaro was said to be a member of the dreaded Langtang Mafia in Nigeria's military circle, a rumoured clique of military men from Langtang in Plateau State who were in powerful positions in government. During the 1985 coup, which deposed Major-General Muhammadu Buhari's regime, Joshua Nimyel Dogonyaro, then a Colonel, announced the deposing of the regime saying:

'A small group of individuals in the Supreme Military Council had abused their power and failed to listen to the advice of their colleagues or the public, about tackling the country's economic problems.'

Lieutenant General Joshua Dogonyaro was reported to be among the top military high-ranking officers who were Anti-June 12, who supported the annulment of the 12 June 1993 election which denied the acclaimed winner, Chief MKO Abiola after overwhelming support to win the presidential election.

== Death ==
Suffered a stroke, died early 14 May 2021 at the age of 80 at the Jos University Teaching Hospital. Remains deposited at Air Force Hospital in Jos.
