= Sierra Leone International Mission School =

School in Freetown, Sierra Leone

Coordinates: 8°26′49.92″N 13°9′36.88″W

Information
- Established: 1992
- Grades: Grade 1 - Grade 12

The Sierra Leone International Mission School commonly called SLIMS or Mission runs a primary (grades 1-6), junior secondary (grades 7-9) and senior secondary (grades 10-12) school. The school was established by missionaries from the Atlanta International Fellowship (AIF) in October 1992 as a school for orphan children in Sierra Leone.

== History ==
The school was started by the AIF as a school for orphan children in 1992, following the visit of Chris Ramsahai, founder of AIF. The school began as a medical clinic with 40 orphan children and by then occupied the building at 195 Bai Bureh Road. The area later became known as Mission, named after the school. In 1994, the school moved to Wellington and by then had 150 students and 18 staff. After securing a lease for 10 acres of land in the same neighbourhood, the school erected its own building. In 1996, the school transferred to its newly built L-shaped structure. A year later, the school constructed and opened a community medical clinic which currently delivers 10 to 15 babies monthly.

The fast progress of the school was deterred in 1999, when rebels took over part of Freetown. The school was vandalized and 900 students and teachers fled for safety. The rebels took control of the site for 9 months until they were finally driven out by ECOMOG forces. The rebels burned down the school as they retreated.

Later in 2000, the school reopened and classes were held under mango trees with the students sitting on the bricks from the burned school building. Seven hundred students returned to the school. A new structure made of zinc was erected while the school building was being rebuilt.

Until 2004, the school was a primary (grades 1-6) school only. A junior secondary (grades 7-9) school was added in 2004 in response to plea from parents, and a senior secondary school (grades 10-12) was added in 2006. Two full-sized basketball courts were constructed that same year. The school’s first graduating senior class was in 2009. In 2008, another school was started in Grafton, in the rural areas of Freetown. Both schools currently have approximately 3, 700 students and 130 workers.
