= 2011 Nigerian Senate elections in Plateau State =

2011 Nigerian Senate election in Plateau State

The 2011 Nigerian Senate election in Plateau State was held on April 9, 2011, to elect members of the Nigerian Senate to represent Plateau State. Victor Lar representing Plateau South and Gyang Dalyop Datong representing Plateau North won on the platform of Peoples Democratic Party, while Joshua Dariye representing Plateau Central won on the platform of Labour Party.

== Overview ==
Affiliation	Party		Total
Affiliation	PDP	LP	Total
Before Election			3
After Election	2	1	3

== Summary ==
District	Incumbent	Party	Elected Senator	Party
Plateau South			Victor Lar	PDP
Plateau North			Gyang Dalyop Datong	PDP
Plateau Central			Joshua Dariye	LP

== Results ==
=== Plateau South ===
Peoples Democratic Party candidate Victor Lar won the election, defeating other party candidates.

2011 Nigerian Senate election in Plateau State
Party	Candidate	Votes	%
PDP	Victor Lar		
Total votes			
PDP hold			

=== Plateau North ===
Peoples Democratic Party candidate Gyang Dalyop Datong won the election, defeating other party candidates.

2011 Nigerian Senate election in Plateau State
Party	Candidate	Votes	%
PDP	Gyang Dalyop Datong		
Total votes			
PDP hold			

=== Plateau Central ===
Labour Party candidate Joshua Dariye won the election, defeating other party candidates.

2011 Nigerian Senate election in Plateau State
Party	Candidate	Votes	%
LP	Joshua Dariye		
Total votes			
LP hold			
