= Langtang Mafia =

The "Langtang Mafia" is a rumored clique of military men from Langtang, Plateau State who held important positions or had influence in the Nigerian government. The term is often used in reference to the 1985 – 1993 Babangida junta. Purported members have included Gen Domkat Bali (retired, deceased), Lt Gen Jeremiah Useni (retired, deceased), Lt Gen Joshua Dogonyaro (retired, deceased), Air Commodore Benard Banfa (retired, deceased), Brig Gen John Nanzip Shagaya (retired and former Senator, deceased), Brig Gen Jonathan Temlong (retired) as well.

== See also ==
- Yakubu Gowon, another Nigerian leader accused of being involved with the Langtang Mafia
