= Nigeria–Russia relations =

- Nigeria: Russia

Diplomatic mission
- Nigerian Embassy, Moscow: Russian Embassy, Abuja

Nigeria–Russia relations are the bilateral foreign relations between Nigeria and Russia. Russia has an embassy in Abuja, and Nigeria has an embassy in Moscow.

The current Ambassador of Russia to Nigeria is Alexey Shebarshin.

== Early years ==
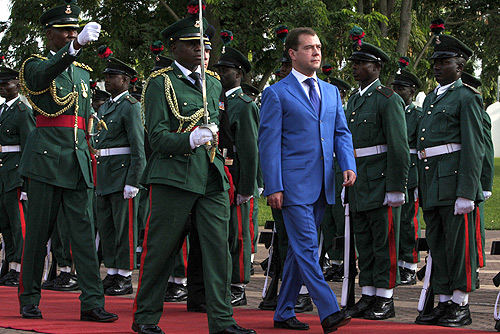
Dmitry Medvedev in Nigeria in 2009.

Diplomatic relations between Nigeria and the Soviet Union were established on 25 November 1960.

The Prime Minister of Nigeria at the time, Sir Abubakar Tafawa Balewa had a pro-West orientation in his foreign policy, which represented for abhorrence to USSR and other Eastern Bloc states. As a result, the circulation of communist literature in Nigeria was banned and students were discouraged from taking Soviet scholarships. Balewa had personally assured the British government "we shall use every means in our power to prevent the infiltration of communism and communist ideas into Nigeria." At one point, the Soviets were implicated in a plot to overthrow Balewa's government.

At the same time, the Communist Party of the Soviet Union did not have close links with the Communist Party of Nigeria, which adopted a more pro-Chinese stance.

== Military governance ==
After the 1966 Nigerian counter-coup, the Soviet Union welcomed General Yakubu Gowon as the new Nigerian leader, especially with the release from prison of Chief Obafemi Awolowo, who had been sympathetic to closer ties with the Soviet Union. Gowon sent a special envoy to Kremlin to further ties.

=== Civil War ===
During the Nigerian Civil War between 1967 and 1970, the USSR provided the Nigerian government with political and military assistance. In January 1970, Nigerian Ambassador George Kurubo praised the Soviet military aid, saying that it "more than any other single thing—more than all other things together" contributed to the government victory. Furthermore, he noted “something commendable, something great and something honorable in this attitude.”

=== Later years ===
A Soviet-owned Ajaokuta Steel Mill and a college and technical school were established in 1975 in Warri. In 1979, Nigeria ordered the Soviet Union to cut its contingent of military advisers in the country from 40 to 5 staff members, in response to inefficient performance and “condescending attitudes” on the part of the Soviet advisers, who train Nigerians to fly Soviet MIG‐21 fighters. In 1984, General Tunde Idiagbon, the Chief of Staff, Supreme Headquarters and second in command to Muhammadu Buhari, led a delegation to the Soviet Union to meet with Soviet leader Konstantin Chernenko.

== Since 1991 ==
Nigeria and the newly formed Russian Federation established diplomatic relations in 1991. In March 2001, the President of Nigeria Olusegun Obasanjo visited Moscow. During that visit, Vladimir Putin and Olusegun Obasanjo signed the declaration “On the Principles of Friendly Relations and Partnership Between the Russian Federation and the Federal Republic of Nigeria”, as well as a program of cooperation in bilateral and international formats between Russia and Nigeria. On June 24, 2009, Russian President Dmitry Medvedev made an official visit to Nigeria as part of a 3 nation tour of Africa. It was the first visit by any Russian leader to Nigeria.

Previously the Nigerian embassy was in Lagos instead of Abuja. The embassy was in Victoria Island.

== Military cooperation ==
In 2017, Russia and Nigeria signed an agreement on military cooperation. Nigeria is interested in buying Russian military equipment. Nigeria has already signed a contract for the purchase of Mi-35 helicopters, six of which have already been delivered. In August 2021, Nigeria and Russia signed an agreement for the Russian Armed Forces to train and supply the Nigerian Armed Forces. It was signed in Moscow by Nigerian Minister of Defence Bashir Salihi Magashi and Russian FSVTS Director Dmitry Shugaev.

== Ambassadors ==
=== Nigeria to Russia ===
- George T. Kurubo (12 August 1967 – 1973)
- Hamzat Ahmadu (1975–1978)
- Abdullahi Sarki Mukhtar (January 23, 2002 – May 30, 2003)
- Dan Suleiman (2006-September 18, 2008)
- Timothy Shelpidi (September 18, 2008 – October 14, 2011)
- Asam Ekanem Asam (2012–2015)
- Steve Davies Ugbah (2018–2021)
- Abdullahi Yibaikwal (2021–present)
