= NGC 972 =

Spiral galaxy in the constellation Aries

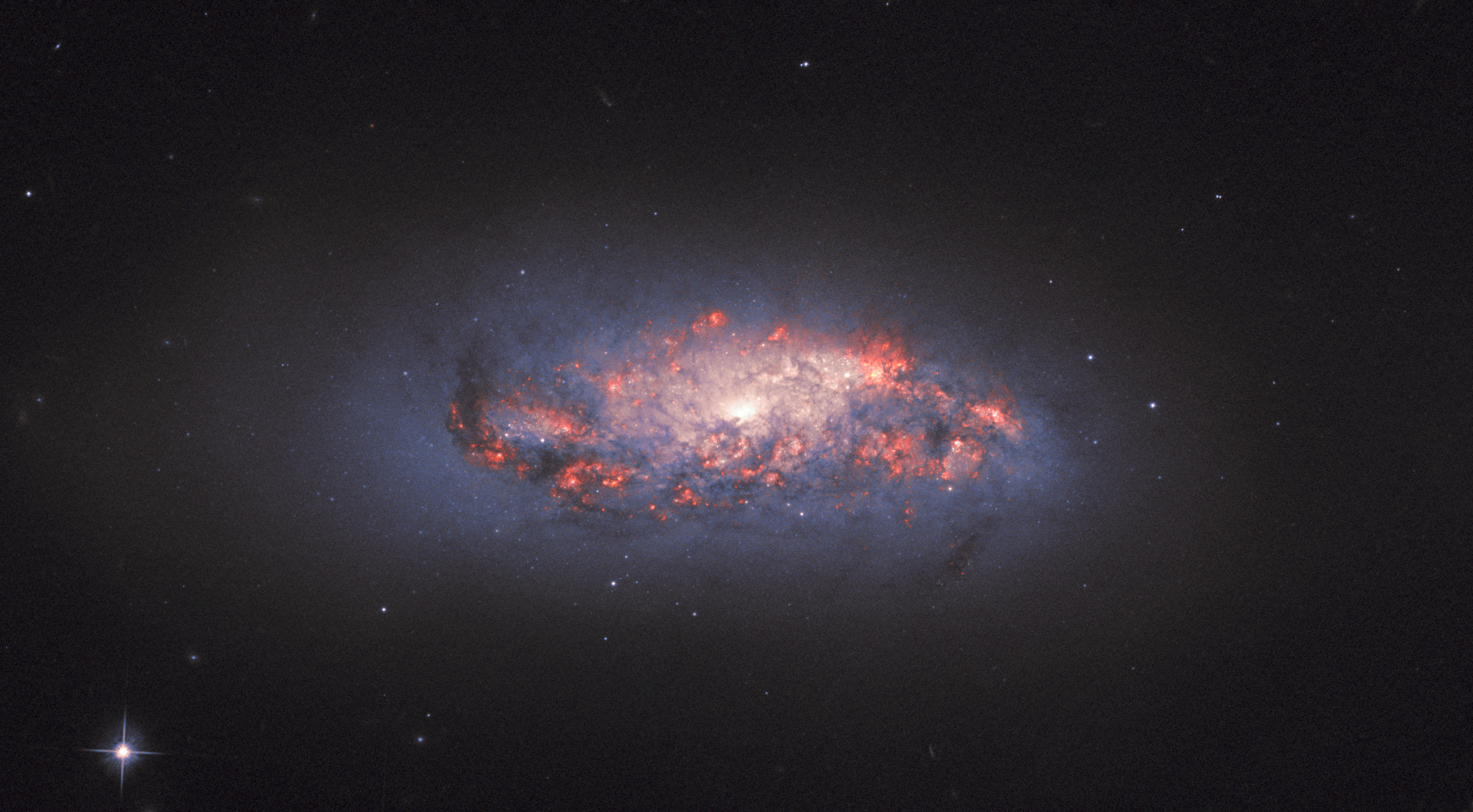
- NGC 972 taken by Hubble Space Telescope.

Observation data (J2000 epoch)
- Constellation: Aries
- Right ascension: 02^{h} 34^{m} 13.385^{s}
- Declination: +29° 18′ 40.47″
- Redshift: 0.005147
- Heliocentric radial velocity: 1,541 km/s
- Distance: 49.8 Mly (15.28 Mpc)
- Apparent magnitude (B): 12.1

Characteristics
- Type: Sb or Sd
- Mass: 1.2×10^{10} M_{☉} M_{☉}
- Apparent size (V): 10 arcmin

Other designations
- LEDA 9788, MCG+05-07-010, UGC 2045

NGC 972 is a dusty spiral galaxy in the northern constellation of Aries, located at an approximate distance of 49.8 Mly from the Milky Way. It was discovered in 1784 by William Herschel. The galactic features suggest it may have undergone a merger with a gas-rich companion, giving it asymmetrical arms, plus starburst activity in the nucleus and an off-planar nuclear ring. The inner 3.6 kpc of the galaxy is undergoing star formation at the rate of 2.1–2.7 M_{☉}·yr^{−1}, but it lacks a nuclear bulge.

On October 16, 2008, a possible supernova event was observed about 16.2″ west and 19.5″ north of the Galactic Center. It reached magnitude 14.7 in the infrared K' band, but only a possible very faint transient event was observed in the visual frequency range, most likely as a result of strong extinction.

The group of galaxies around NGC 972 is sometimes referred to as the "NGC 972 group," which includes NGC 1012, NGC 1056, UGC 1958, UGC 2017, UGC 2053, and UGC 2221.
