= Langtang, Nigeria =

Langtang
- Town
- Nickname: langtang
- Location within Nigeria Location within Africa
- Coordinates: 9°08′30″N 9°47′28″E
- Country: Nigeria
- LGA: Langtang North

Government
  - Local Government Chairman and the Head of the Local Government Council: Hon. Pirfa Jingfa Tyem
- Time zone: UTC+1 (WAT)

Langtang is a town and local government headquarters in Plateau State, Middle Belt region of Nigeria. The town is located in the Plateau South Senetarial District connected to Shendam, Kanam and Wase, through paved roads.

It has the local government secretariat and the Ponzhi Tarok palace situated at the heart of the town. It is the home to Prominent Nigeria Military Generals, who include Generals Domkat Bali (deceased), Joseph Nanven Garba (deceased), Jeremiah Useni, Joshua Dogonyaro (deceased), John Shagaya, Jonathan Temlong, Musa Gambo, Yakubu Rimdam, and Ishaku Pennap. Others are Air Marshal Jonah Wuyep, Air Vice Marshal Napoleon B. Bali, General Samuel Nankpak Abashe, Air Commodore Bernard Banfa and General Muhammad A. Najib as well. It is also hometown to elder statesmen; Chief Solomon Lar (the first Civilian Governor of Plateau State) (deceased), Chief Ezekiel S. Yusuf (deceased) (the first Executive Chairman of Langtang Local Government) and Reverend Canon Selcan Miner (the first Commissioner of Education for then Benue-Plateau state, the first Chairman of the Middle-belt forum, the former Secretary to Plateau State Government and current chief elder of the taroh nation).

Langtang has a General Hospital owned by the state government and branch of the Jos University teaching Hospital [JUTH] at Zamco, and schools spread across the Local Government amongst which are Federal Government Girls College, Langtang, Government Secondary School Langtang. The town has two dams and a water treatment plant that caters for its populace. The major tribe is Tarok, their language is Tarok, and their major religions are Christianity and ATR. They produce farm produce like groundnuts, millet, guinea corn, etc. langtang North local government is the first local government to owned and operate a licensed commercial radio station [Nggapak 93.1 Unity Fm] in Nigeria.

== See also ==
- Langtang Mafia
- Tarok people
- reuben sarki chief information officer
