= Embassy of Nigeria, Moscow =

Coordinates: 55.7661°N 37.5978°E

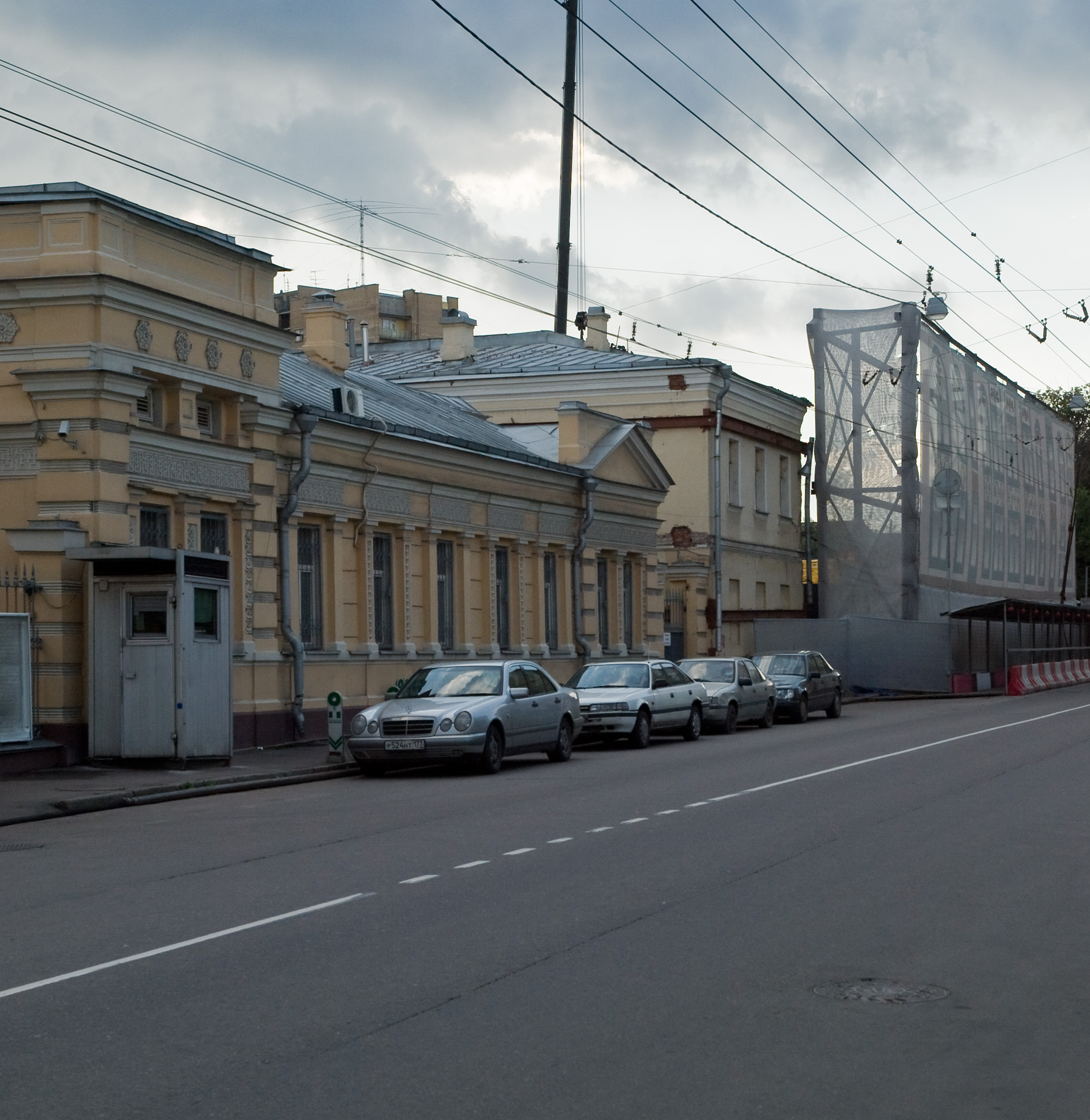

The Embassy of the Federal Republic of Nigeria in Moscow is the diplomatic mission of Nigeria in the Russian Federation. The embassy is also accredited to Belarus. It is located at No.5 Malaya Mamonovsky Pereulok (Russian: Мамоновский пер., д.5) in the Central Administrative District of Moscow. The current ambassador is Abdullahi Yibaikwal Shehu.

== See also ==
- Nigeria–Russia relations
- Diplomatic missions in Russia
