= John Nanzip Shagaya =

Nigerian military officer and politician (1942–2018)

Brigadier General John Nanzip Shagaya

Nigerian Senator from Plateau South
- In office May 2007 – May 2011
- Preceded by: Cosmos Niagwan
- Succeeded by: Victor Lar

Commander of the ECOMOG Peacekeeping Force, Liberia
- In office October 1993 – December 1993
- Preceded by: Brig-Gen. T. Olurin
- Succeeded by: Maj-Gen. J.M. Inienger

Federal Minister of Internal Affairs
- In office 1985–1990
- Preceded by: Mohammed Magoro
- Succeeded by: Lambert Gwom

Personal details
- Born: 2 September 1942 Langtang, Northern Region, British Nigeria (now in Plateau State, Nigeria)
- Died: 11 February 2018 (aged 75) Amper, Kanke, Plateau State, Nigeria
- Party: People's Democratic Party (PDP)
- Children: Late Nanpon, Nansak, Chalya, Simdul, Hussaina Nandir, Nanzip jnr. (Sign P.A.W)
- Education: Nigerian Military School
- Profession: Soldier, Politician

Military service
- Allegiance: Nigeria
- Branch/service: Nigerian Army
- Years of service: 1964–1993
- Rank: Brigadier General
- Commands: Field Commander, ECOMOG Peacekeeping Force in Liberia (1993)

John Nanzip Shagaya (Danburam Langtang II) (2 September 1942 – 11 February 2018) was a Nigerian senator and former military officer who was in April 2007 elected to represent the People's Democratic Party (PDP) in Plateau State as member of the Nigerian Senate for Plateau South. He ran for reelection in April 2011 on the Labour Party (LP) platform, but was defeated by Victor Lar of the People's Democratic Party (PDP). As a non commissioned officer (NCO) with the 2nd Reconnaissance Squadron in Abeokuta, he participated in the Nigerian counter-coup of 1966.

== Background ==
John Shagaya was born on September 2, 1942, to Mallam Sikji Miri Wazhi (alias SHAGAYA) and Mrs. Maryamu Zwancit. He attended Junior Primary School at Nyer, and Sudan United Mission Primary School, Langtang (1952–1959). He studied at the Nigerian Military School Zaria 1960–1964.

== Military career ==
After graduation, Shagaya was posted to the Nigerian Army Corps, then posted to 3 Marine Commando when he gained his commission as Second Lieutenant. He participated with the Marine Commando in the Nigeria Civil War (1967–1970). Later appointments included Grade Three staff officer Nigeria Army School of Infantry, Jaji, Director of Cadets, Nigerian Defence Academy, Director of the Armed Forces Command and Staff College, Jaji, Brigade Commander, 9 Mechanised Infantry Brigade, Military Secretary, Army Headquarters, and General Officer Commanding;1st Mechanised Infantry Division

Under the Military government of General Ibrahim Babangida, Shagaya was Federal Minister of Internal Affairs, a member of the Armed Forces Ruling Council and a member of the Police Council. He also served as chairman of the committee set up in 1987 to decide on Nigeria's membership of the Organisation of the Islamic Conference. Shagaya was involved in drafting the main protocols for the Economic Community of West African States. As a member of the National Boundary Commission, he helped resolve disputes with Benin and Chad.

Shagaya was appointed Field Commander in the ECOMOG Peacekeeping Force in Liberia in September 1993, relieving Major General Tunji Olurin. On November 17, 1993, General Sani Abacha became head of state after a military coup. Abacha distrusted Brigadier John Shagaya and other "IBB boys" loyal to Babangida. Within a few days, Shagaya was recalled from Liberia, demoted from Major General to Brigadier General and then retired from the army.

== Participation in the Nigerian Counter Coup of July 1966 ==
Shagaya, then a Corporal with the 2nd Reconnaissance Squadron in Abeokuta, was one of the many soldiers of northern Nigerian origin (including 2nd Lieutenant Sani Abacha, Lieutenant Muhammadu Buhari, Lieutenant Ibrahim Bako, Major Theophilus Danjuma, Lieutenant Colonel Murtala Muhammed, and Lieutenant Ibrahim Babangida among others), who staged what became known as the Nigerian counter-coup of 1966 because of grievances they felt towards the administration of General Aguiyi Ironsi's government which quelled the January 15, 1966, coup.

== Civilian activities ==
John Shagaya was Director of Lion Bank (Nigeria) between 1998 and 2003. Shagaya was a founding member of the United Nigeria People's Party (UNPP), running unsuccessfully for the Senatorial seat of Plateau South in 1999 elections. Before the 2003 elections he joined the All Nigeria People's Party (ANPP), but was defeated again.

== Senate career ==
Shagaya had converted from a military officer to a politician, earned the title of a moderate, and was elected as Senator for Plateau South in April 2007, running on the platform of PDP. His election was challenged, and nullified by the elections petition tribunal, but in December 2008 a Court of Appeal in Jos overthrew this decision and ordered the Independent National Electoral Commission (INEC) to immediately issue a Certificate of Return to Shagaya.

In June 2009, Shagaya warned that offering an amnesty to the Niger Delta militants might not end the violence. The militants might hide their best weapons, and return only disused and damaged ones. In an interview in October 2009 he defended the various military interventions since Nigeria gained independence, and stated that the influence of generals in politics since 1999 simply reflected their training and discipline.

== Death ==
John Nanzip Shagaya was involved in a car accident on 11 February 2018 while returning to Jos from Langtang, at a time when he was involved in reconciling the quarrelling North of Nigeria.

BIBLIOGRAPHY

- John Nanzip Shagaya (1990). The Internal Affairs Ministry: an overview. Alfa Communications. ISBN 978-30993-0-2.
- John Nanzip Shagaya (2003). Governance in Nigeria: the IBB era, an insider's view. Viewpoint Communications Ltd. ISBN 978-33747-5-3.
