= United Nations Security Council Resolution 866 =

UN Security Council Resolution 866
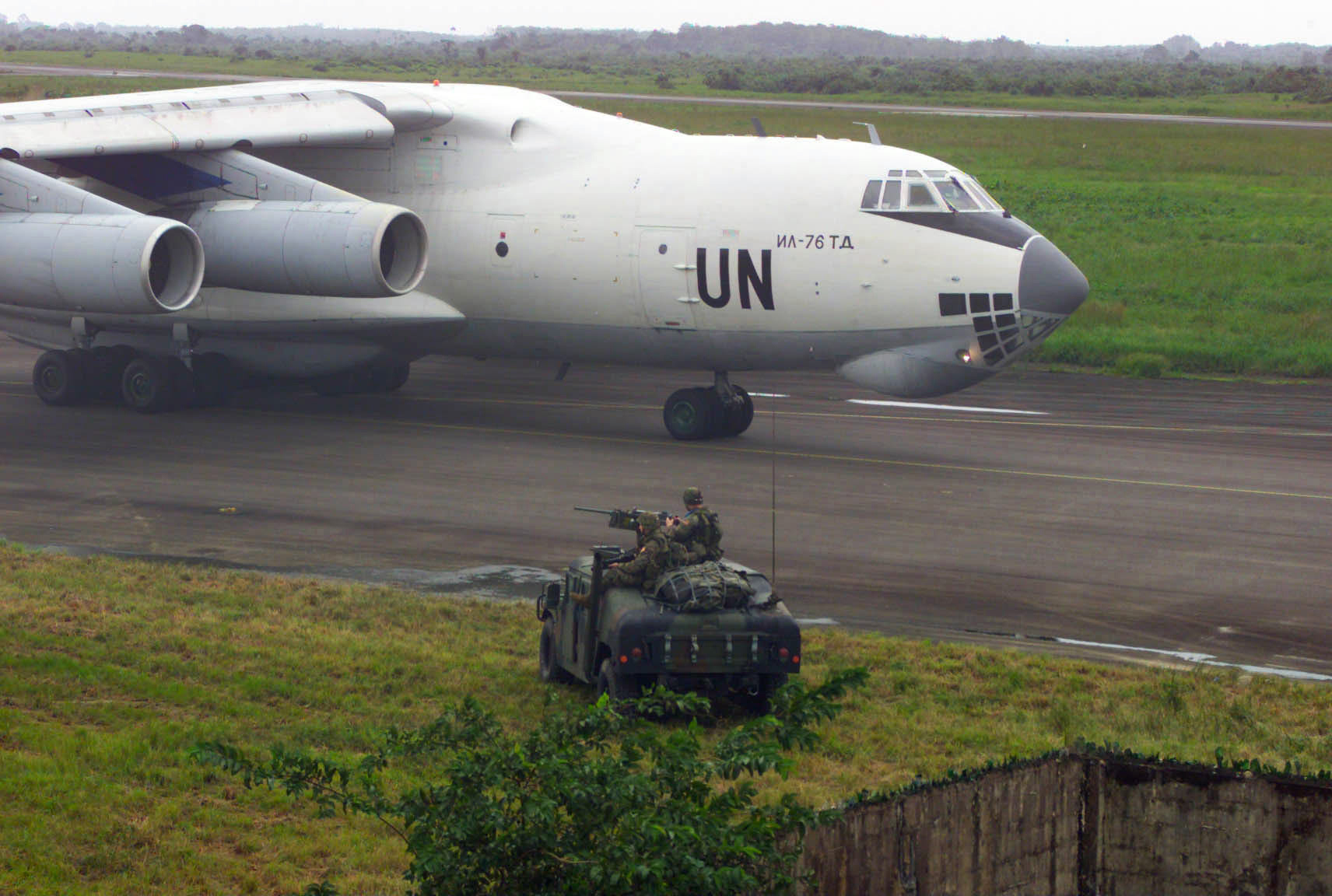
- United Nations plane at Roberts International Airport in Liberia
- Date: 22 September 1993
- Meeting no.: 3,281
- Code: S/RES/866 (Document)
- Subject: The situation in Liberia
- Voting summary: 15 voted for; None voted against; None abstained
- Result: Adopted

Security Council composition
- Permanent members: China; France; Russia; United Kingdom; United States
- Non-permanent members: Brazil; Cape Verde; Djibouti; Hungary; Japan; Morocco; New Zealand; Pakistan; Spain; Venezuela

United Nations Security Council resolution 866, adopted unanimously on 22 September 1993, after reaffirming resolutions 813 (1993) and 856 (1993), the council noted that United Nations involvement would contribute significantly to the effective implementation of the peace agreement in Liberia and went on to establish the United Nations Observer Mission in Liberia (UNOMIL).

The council noted the Peace Agreement signed on 25 July 1993 and to the Economic Community of West African States Monitoring Group (ECOMOG) for help in implementing it. Economic Community of West African States (ECOWAS) would be responsible for the implementation of the military terms of the agreement while the United Nations would supervise, very much in the background. It would be the first time that a United Nations peacekeeping mission would cooperate alongside an already existing peacekeeping mission of another organisation. The importance of close cooperation between UNOMIL, ECOMOG and the Organisation of African Unity (OAU) was stressed. At the same time, the council welcomed the establishment of the Joint Cease-Fire Monitoring Committee (JCMC) composed of three Liberian parties, ECOMOG and the United Nations, and that the peace agreement called for elections to take place within seven months.

UNOMIL was then established under the direction of the secretary-general through his special representative for a period of seven months, subject to the provision that it will continue beyond 16 December 1993 only upon a review by the council on whether progress had been made in implementing the agreement. The mission would include military observers and medical, engineering, communications, transportation, electoral and support personnel in accordance with the secretary-general's report, and would have the following mandate:

(a) investigate violations of the ceasefire;
(b) ensure compliance with the peace agreement;
(c) monitor the electoral process;
(d) assist in the coordination of humanitarian assistance;
(e) develop a plan and assess financial requirements for the demobilisation of combatants;
(f) report violations of international humanitarian law;
(g) train ECOMOG personnel in the demining process;
(h) cooperate with ECOMOG in its duties.

The intention of Boutros-Ghali to define the roles and responsibilities of UNOMIL and ECOWAS in the implementation of the Peace Agreement was welcomed, requesting African states to provide troops when required to ECOMOG. The Secretary-General had established a fund through which Member States could contribute to the mission.

The resolution called upon the parties in Liberia to disarm and demobilise. Their decision to form a provisional government was welcomed by Council and was urged to sign a status of mission agreement within sixty days of UNOMIL's installation. Preparations for the Election Commission were told to be finalised so that organisation of the elections by March 1994 could begin, to be held as envisaged in the peace agreement. Finally, they were called together to work on the safe distribution of relief supplies and protect UNOMIL and humanitarian personnel, requesting the Secretary-General to report back on 16 December 1993 and 16 February 1994 on the implementation of the current resolution.

== See also ==
- Charles Taylor
- First Liberian Civil War
- List of United Nations Security Council Resolutions 801 to 900 (1993–1994)
