= United Nations Security Council Resolution 856 =

1993 UN Security Council resolution on Liberia

UN Security Council Resolution 856
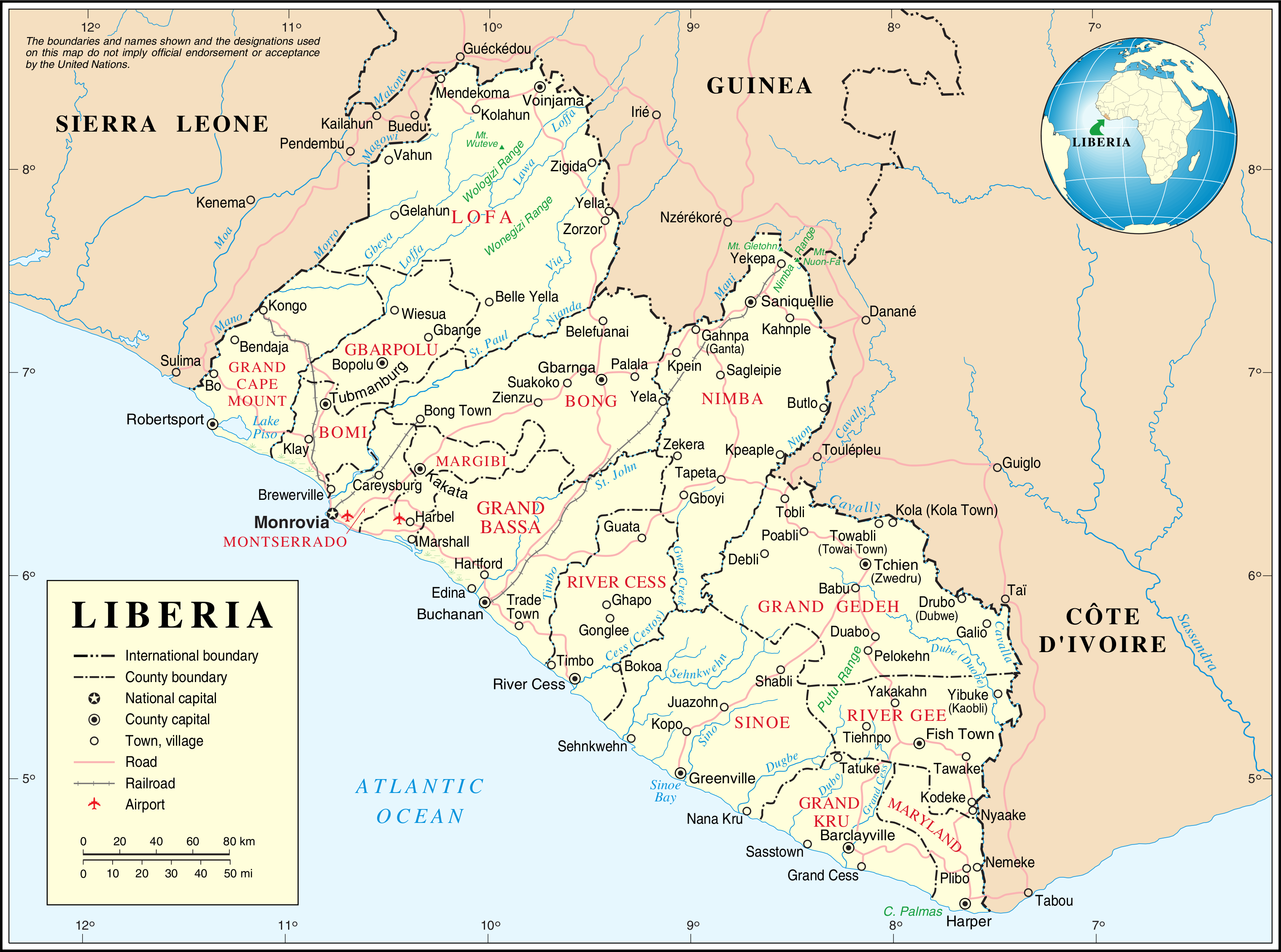
- Liberia
- Date: 10 August 1993
- Meeting no.: 3,263
- Code: S/RES/856 (Document)
- Subject: The situation in Liberia
- Voting summary: 15 voted for; None voted against; None abstained
- Result: Adopted

Security Council composition
- Permanent members: China; France; Russia; United Kingdom; United States
- Non-permanent members: Brazil; Cape Verde; Djibouti; Hungary; Japan; Morocco; New Zealand; Pakistan; Spain; Venezuela

United Nations Security Council resolution 856, adopted unanimously on 10 August 1993, after reaffirming Resolution 813 (1993) and welcoming a peace agreement signed, under the auspices of the Economic Community of West African States (ECOWAS), between the Interim Government of National Unity of Liberia (IGNU), the National Patriotic Front of Liberia (NPFL), and the United Liberation Movement for Democracy (ULIMO), the Council approved a dispatch of 30 military observers to Liberia.

The Council discussed the proposed establishment of the United Nations Observer Mission in Liberia (UNOMIL), further announcing that the military observers would participate in the work of the Joint Cease-fire Monitoring Committee, including in particular to monitor, investigate and report ceasefire violations for a period of three months. A report of the Secretary-General Boutros Boutros-Ghali was anticipated concerning the proposed establishment of UNOMIL and its financial costs, a time-frame and projected conclusion of the operation and co-operation with the ECOWAS peacekeeping force already in Liberia.

All parties to the conflict were urged to respect and implement the ceasefire and ensure the safety of all United Nations and other peacekeeping and humanitarian personnel in the country. It also called for the conclusion of a Status of Forces Agreement. Finally, the efforts of the Organisation of African Unity and the Economic Community of West African States Monitoring Group in Liberia were praised.

== See also ==
- Charles Taylor
- First Liberian Civil War
- List of United Nations Security Council Resolutions 801 to 900 (1993–1994)
