= United Nations Security Council Resolution 813 =

UN Security Council Resolution 813
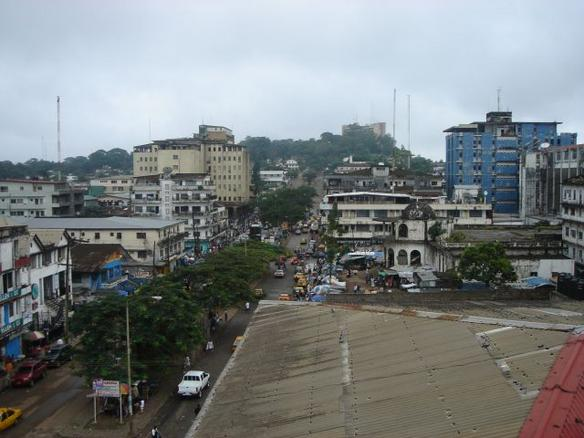
- Liberian capital Monrovia
- Date: 26 March 1993
- Meeting no.: 3,187
- Code: S/RES/813 (Document)
- Subject: Liberia
- Voting summary: 15 voted for; None voted against; None abstained
- Result: Adopted

Security Council composition
- Permanent members: China; France; Russia; United Kingdom; United States
- Non-permanent members: Brazil; Cape Verde; Djibouti; Hungary; Japan; Morocco; New Zealand; Pakistan; Spain; Venezuela

United Nations Security Council Resolution 813, adopted unanimously on 26 March 1993, after reaffirming Resolution 788 (1992) and determining that the situation in Liberia constituted a threat to international peace and security, the Council condemned the failure of the parties in the country – the Armed Forces of Liberia, ULIMO, National Patriotic Front of Liberia and Independent National Patriotic Front of Liberia among others, to implement the Yamoussoukro IV Accord.

The Council welcomed the report of the Secretary-General Boutros Boutros-Ghali and his appointment of Trevor Gordon-Somers as Special Representative for Liberia, and commended the efforts of the Organisation of African Unity and Economic Community of West African States (ECOWAS) to help restore stability in Liberia, reaffirming the belief that the Yamoussoukro IV Accord offers the best possible framework for a peaceful resolution of the Liberian civil war. It also condemned attacks on the peacekeeping forces and the violation of the ceasefire, calling on all parties to implement the Accord.

The resolution called upon all Member States to abide by the arms embargo on the country imposed under Chapter VII of the United Nations Charter, demanding that all parties co-operate with United Nations and ECOWAS personnel, proposing to consider against parties that are unwilling to co-operate. It also commended the efforts of Member States and international organisations for their humanitarian efforts in Liberia.

Resolution 813 concluded by requesting the Secretary-General to:

(a) consider the possibility of convening a meeting of the President of the Interim Government of National Unity and the warring factions;
(b) discuss with ECOWAS and the parties concerned the contribution which the United Nations could make in support of the implementation of the Yamoussoukro IV Accord and possible deployment of observers;
(c) report back to the Security Council on the implementation of the current resolution as soon as possible.

== See also ==
- Charles Taylor
- First Liberian Civil War
- List of United Nations Security Council Resolutions 801 to 900 (1993–1994)
