= United Nations Security Council Resolution 788 =

UN Security Council Resolution 788
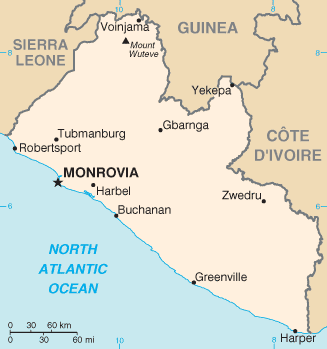
- Liberia
- Date: 19 November 1992
- Meeting no.: 3,138
- Code: S/RES/788 (Document)
- Subject: Liberia
- Voting summary: 15 voted for; None voted against; None abstained
- Result: Adopted

Security Council composition
- Permanent members: China; France; Russia; United Kingdom; United States
- Non-permanent members: Austria; Belgium; Cape Verde; Ecuador; Hungary; India; Japan; Morocco; Venezuela; Zimbabwe

United Nations Security Council resolution 788, adopted unanimously on 19 November 1992, after determining that the deterioration of the situation in Liberia constituted a threat to international peace and security, the council imposed an arms embargo on the country for the purposes of establishing peace and stability.

The council began by commending the efforts of the Economic Community of West African States (ECOWAS) and reaffirmed the Yamoussoukro IV Accord, signed on 30 October 1991 as the best possible framework for a peaceful resolution of the Liberian conflict. The Accord provided for a Transitional Government with legislative, executive and judicial branches as well as allowing presidential elections to take place within seven months of the agreement being signed.

The resolution then condemned a violation of the ceasefire on 28 November 1990 and attacks on the ECOWAS Monitoring Group in Liberia, calling upon all parties to respect international law and implement the relevant agreements. It also requested the Secretary-General Boutros Boutros-Ghali to send a special representative to Liberia to assess the situation, reporting to the council with any recommendations.

Then, acting under Chapter VII of the United Nations Charter, the council decided that all states should immediately implement a general and complete embargo on all deliveries of weapons and military equipment to Liberia until the security council decided otherwise. The embargo however, would not apply to weapons and military equipment destined for the ECOWAS peacekeeping forces, and subsequently it was violated and exacerbated the conflict. Finally, the council commended the work of international humanitarian organisations and Member States in providing humanitarian aid to the population.

== See also ==
- Charles Taylor
- First Liberian Civil War
- List of United Nations Security Council Resolutions 701 to 800 (1991–1993)
