= United Nations Observer Mission in Liberia =

1993–97 peacekeeping mission in West Africa

- UNOMIL medal bar
- Abbreviation: UNOMIL
- Formation: 22 September 1993
- Type: Peacekeeping Mission
- Legal status: Ended 12 September 1997
- Parent organization: United Nations Security Council
- Website: https://www.un.org/en/peacekeeping/missions/past/unomil.htm

The United Nations Observer Mission in Liberia (UNOMIL) was a United Nations peacekeeping mission in Liberia. It was established in Resolution 866 (1993) and headquartered in the capital Monrovia.

UNOMIL was created as part of the Cotonou Agreement to support the efforts of the Economic Community of West African States (ECOWAS) in Liberia during the First Liberian Civil War (1989–1996). Its initial mandate was to monitor the implementation of peace agreements between the Liberian parties, investigate ceasefire violations, assist in maintenance of assembly sites and demobilisation of combatants, facilitate humanitarian assistance, investigate violations of human rights and to monitor the electoral process. During its mandate, UNOMIL carried out logistical work while the Economic Community of West African States Monitoring Group provided security, and undertook public information campaigns with the aim of educating voters.

It was superseded by the United Nations Mission in Liberia, established in September 2003.

== See also ==
- List of United Nations peacekeeping missions
