= Economic Community of West African States Monitoring Group =

West African multilateral armed force

Map of ECOMOG members as of 2024

The Economic Community of West African States Monitoring Group (ECOMOG) was a West African multilateral armed force established by the Economic Community of West African States (ECOWAS). ECOMOG was a formal arrangement for separate armies to work together. It was largely supported by personnel and resources of the Nigerian Armed Forces, with sub-battalion strength units contributed by other ECOWAS members — Ghana, Guinea, Sierra Leone, The Gambia, Liberia, and others. While Mali, Niger, and Burkina Faso being former members of ECOWAS and ECOMOG.

== History ==
Nigeria and other ECOWAS members agreed to a Protocol on Mutual Defence Assistance, in Freetown, Sierra Leone, on 29 May 1981. Among other organs such as a Defence Committee and Council, it provided for the establishment of an Allied Armed Force of the Community (AAFC) as needed.

Anglophone ECOWAS members established ECOMOG in 1990 to intervene in the civil war in Liberia (1989–97). Nigerian scholar Adekeye Adebajo wrote in 2002 that "there was merit...in the argument that the establishment of ECOMOG did not conform to the constitutional legal requirements of ECOWAS". The Standing Mediation Committee, the body that established ECOMOG at its meeting in Banjul, Gambia on 6–7 August 1990, was 'on shaky legal foundations.' Adebajo concludes that the arguments used to establish ECOMOG had more solid grounds in politics than in law. The Defence Protocol's guidelines were not followed, and ECOMOG was justified largely on humanitarian grounds.

Within Africa, ECOMOG represented the first credible attempt at a regional security initiative since the Organisation of African Unity (OAU) tried to establish an 'Inter-African Force' to intervene in Chad in 1981.

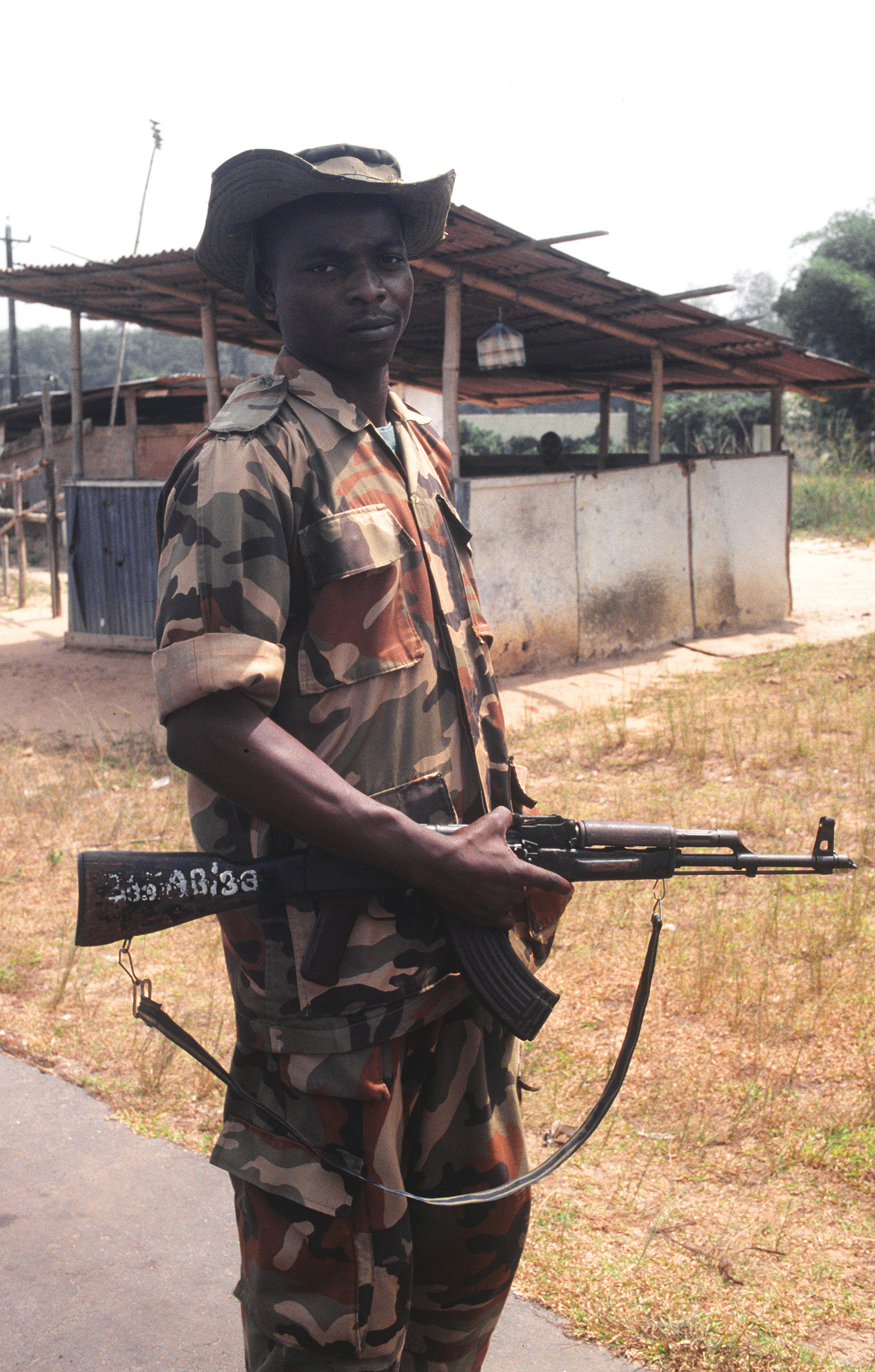
A Nigerian ECOMOG soldier outside Monrovia, Liberia (1997)

Anglophone members of ECOMOG acted because several Francophone ECOWAS members strongly opposed the deployment. The leaders of Burkina Faso and Côte d'Ivoire supported Charles Taylor in his attempt to depose Samuel Doe. Unlike the typical UN mission of its day, ECOMOG's first deployment entailed fighting its way into a many-sided civil war, in an attempt to forcibly hold the warring factions apart.

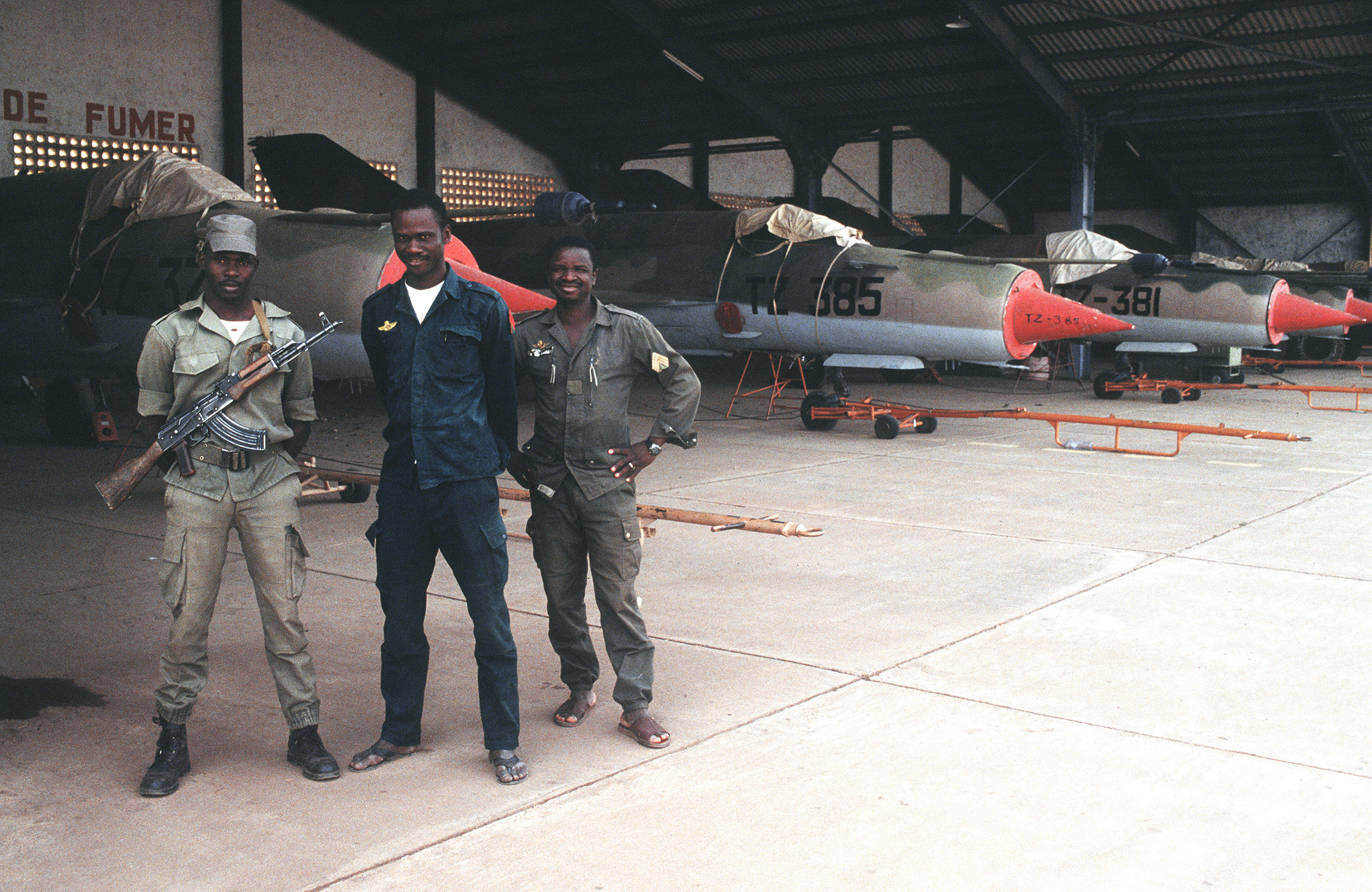
Malian ECOMOG troops in front of Mali Air Force's MiG 21bis fighter aircraft at Bamako–Sénou Airport in Mali (1997)

The first Force Commander was Ghanaian Lieutenant General Arnold Quainoo, but he was succeeded by an unbroken line of Nigerian officers. Major General Joshua Dogonyaro took over from Quainoo after Quainoo had left Monrovia for consultations with senior ECOWAS officials soon after the death of Samuel Doe at the hands of Prince Johnson's Independent National Patriotic Front of Liberia on 9 September 1990.

After some prompting from Taylor that the anglophone Nigerians were opposed to him, Senegalese troops were brought in with some financial support from the United States. Their service was, however, short-lived, after a major confrontation with Taylor forces in Vahun, Lofa County on 28 May 1992, when six were killed when a crowd of NPFL supporters surrounded their vehicle and demanded they surrender their jeep and weapons. All of Senegal's 1,500 soldiers were withdrawn by mid January 1993.

Throughout the mission, corruption and organized looting by ECOMOG troops led some Liberians to re-coin the acronym ECOMOG as "Every Car or Movable Object Gone." Stephen Ellis reports one of the most egregious examples as being the total removal of iron ore processing machinery for onward sale while the Buchanan compound was under ECOMOG control.

The United States State Department provided some logistics support to the force via the U.S. company Pacific Architects & Engineers, which provided trucks and drivers. Five Air Force C-130 Hercules also moved African troops and supplies during Operation Assured Lift in February–March 1997.

Following Charles Taylor's election as President of Liberia on 19 July 1997, the final Field Commander, General Timothy Shelpidi, withdrew the force fully by the end of 1998.

ECOWAS deployed ECOMOG forces later on to control conflict in other cases:

- 1997 — Sierra Leone, to stop the RUF rebellion.
- 1999 — Guinea-Bissau, to end the Guinea-Bissau Civil War

In 2001, ECOWAS planned to deploy 1,700 men along the Guinea–Liberia border to stop guerrilla infiltration by fighters opposed to the new post-1998 election government. However, fighting between Charles Taylor's new government and the new LURD rebel movement, plus a lack of funding, meant no force was actually ever deployed.

In 2003 ECOWAS, under pressure from the United States, launched a similar mission named ECOMIL to halt the occupation of Monrovia by rebel forces as peace efforts were ongoing, during the Second Liberian Civil War. Always intended as an interim force, it was quickly succeeded by the United Nations mission UNMIL.

== ECOMOG Commanders ==
Below is a chronological list of ECOMOG commanders:

=== Liberia ===
Commander	Country	Title	Dates
Lt-Gen. Arnold Quainoo	Ghana	Force Commander	July 1990 - September 1990
Maj-Gen. Joshua Dogonyaro	Nigeria	Field Commander	September 1990 - February 1991
Maj-Gen. Rufus Kupolati	Nigeria	Field Commander	February 1991 - September 1991
Maj-Gen. Ishaya Bakut	Nigeria	Field Commander	September 1991- October 1992
Brig-Gen. Tunji Olurin	Nigeria	Field Commander	October 1992 - October 1993
Maj-Gen. John Shagaya	Nigeria	Field Commander	October 1993 - December 1993
Maj-Gen. John Mark Inienger	Nigeria	Field Commander	December 1993 - August 1996
Maj-Gen. Victor Malu	Nigeria	Force Commander	August 1996 - January 1998
Maj-Gen. Timothy Shelpidi	Nigeria	Force Commander	January 1998 - March 1999
Maj-Gen. Felix Mujakperuo	Nigeria	Force Commander	1999

=== Sierra Leone ===
Commander	Year(s)
Major-Gen. Gabriel Kpamber	2000
Brig-Gen. Abu Ahmadu	2000
Brig-Gen. Maxwell Khobe	1999
Major-Gen. Felix Mujakperuo	1999
Major-Gen. Abdul One Mohammed	1998

== See also ==
- ECOWAS Standby Force
