= Hassan Bility =

Liberian journalist

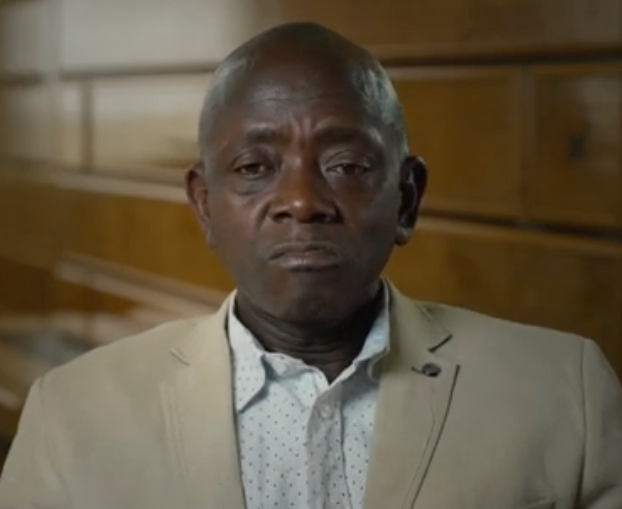
- In a UNOHCHR video in 2018
- Born: 20 June 1969 (age 57); Yekepa, Nimba County, Liberia
- Education: University of Liberia
- Occupation: Journalist

Hassan Bility (born 20 June 1969) is a Liberian journalist, and the founder and Director of the Global Justice and Research Project (GJRP), a non-governmental organization dedicated to the documentation of war time atrocities in Liberia and to assisting victims in their pursuit of justice for these crimes.

During Liberia's First and Second Civil Wars, Bility was one of the country's most prominent journalists and human rights activists. While serving as editor-in-chief of The Analyst newspaper under the regime of Charles Taylor, he was arrested multiple times. During the last of his arrests, he was accused of being an "unlawful combatant", and was brutally tortured on Taylor's orders. He later testified in several trials, including the so-called "RUF trial" of three former members of the Revolutionary United Front, as well as the trial of Charles Taylor, at the Special Court for Sierra Leone (SCSL); the trial of Charles McArthur Emmanuel, commonly known as Chuckie Taylor, in the US; and the trial of Guus Kouwenhoven in the Netherlands.

== Early life and education ==
Hassan Bility was born in Yekepa on 20 June 1969.

He earned a bachelor's degree in mass communication with a minor in political science at the University of Liberia in 1998.

== Career ==
=== Journalism ===
Bility worked as managing editor of The National newspaper in Monrovia, Liberia from 1997 to 2000. In the latter year, he became editor-in-chief of The Analyst and the training officer of the Press Union of Liberia. At the same time, he was engaged as coordinator of the London-based International Alert peace-building program, through the Press Union of Liberia, and served as press officer of the European Union (EU) Liberian office in Monrovia under Ambassador Brian O'Neal.

Bility was a contracted writer with Amnesty International from 2003 to 2004. In 2004, he became Director of Communication at the International Institute for Justice and Development (IIJD), based in Boston, Massachusetts, United States. He toured the US speaking and raising awareness about the atrocities committed in Liberia.

=== Documentation work ===
Since 2006, Bility has been working on the documentation of war-time crimes in Liberia in order assist in multiple investigations against alleged war criminals.

=== Global Justice and Research Project (GJRP) ===
Bility founded the GJRP in 2012. Since then, under his leadership, the GJRP's documentation work has contributed to the investigation and arrest of multiple alleged Liberian war criminals throughout Europe and the US, including the arrests of:

- Alieu Kosiah, a former commander of the ULIMO rebel group (2014, Switzerland);
- Martina Johnson, a former commander of Charles Taylor's rebel group, the National Patriotic Front of Liberia (NFPL), for her implication in mutilations and mass killing committed in Liberia during the First Liberian Civil War (2014, Belgium);
- Mohammed Jabbateh, a former commander of the ULIMO rebel group (2016, the US);
- Agnes Reeves Taylor, Charles Taylor's ex-wife, for her suspected involvement with the NFPL during the First Liberian Civil War (2017, the UK);
- Kunti K., a former commander of the ULIMO rebel group, for his alleged involvement in crimes against humanity committed during the First Liberian Civil War (2018, France);
- Thomas Woewiyu, co-founder and former spokesperson of the NPFL, and for several years Charles Taylor's Defence Minister (2018, the US); Woewiyu's sentencing hearing was postponed several times during 2018 and 2019. After the last postponement in April 2019, a new date for the hearing was not set, but was expected in 2020. Woewiyu was not in custody awaiting sentencing. On April 12, he died of COVID-19 after a week of treatment at the Bryn Mawr Hospital in Philadelphia, U.S.
- Gibril Massaquoi, a former Revolutionary United Front (RUF) war lord of Sierra Leone, for war crimes and crimes against humanity allegedly committed in Liberia during the Second Liberian Civil War (2020, Finland)

== Awards ==
- 2002 – Press Union of Liberia, Best Journalist of the Year Award, Monrovia, Liberia
- 2003 – Amnesty International, International UK Media Award under the category "Human Rights Journalism under Threat", London, UK
- 2003 – The Hassan Bility Courageous Journalism Award initiated by Liberians, US
- 2004 – Freedom and Human Rights Courage Award, Philadelphia, PA, US
- 2018 – Judith Lee Stronach Human Rights award for his courage, and his singular pursuit of justice for Liberia.
