= Civitas Maxima =

Non-governmental organisation

Civitas Maxima is a non-governmental organisation that documents mass crimes, such as crimes against humanity, genocide, and war crimes, and pursues justice on behalf of the victims, particularly in West Africa.

== Concept and operation ==
Founded in September 2012 by human rights lawyer and activist Alain Werner, Civitas Maxima is an organisation that focuses on the meticulous documentation of mass crimes, and pursue of justice on behalf of the victims.

Since its establishment in 2012, Civitas Maxima, working with its partners (Global Justice and Research Project in Liberia and Center for Accountability and the Rule of Law in Sierra Leone) has built cases and contributed to the arrest of several individuals suspected of involvement in war crimes and crimes against humanity, collaborating with several different war crimes units, agents and/or prosecutors in Europe and the United States.

== Public cases ==
=== Martina Johnson ===
Martina Johnson, a former commander of the National Patriotic Front of Liberia (NFPL, group headed by Charles Taylor), was arrested and indicted in 2014 for her implication in mutilations and mass killing committed in Liberia during the First Liberian Civil War.

=== Alieu Kosiah ===
In 2014, Alieu Kosiah was arrested for suspected involvement in war crimes committed by the United Liberation Movement of Liberia for Democracy (ULIMO) while fighting the NPFL between 1993 and 1995. In November 2019, the Swiss Federal Criminal Court listed the criminal case against Alieu Kosiah for trial in Bellinzona for April 2020 (14 to 30).

The trial was repeatedly postponed because the COVID-19 pandemic made it impossible for seven Liberian victims who are formal parties to the proceeding called "private plaintiffs" and for witnesses to travel from Liberia for the proceeding. The Swiss Federal Criminal Court said that efforts to arrange for their testimony via video link from Monrovia, Liberia's capital, were unsuccessful.

The Court has decided to only proceed with the preliminary questions and the hearing of the defendant from 3–11 December 2020. The rest of the trial – the hearing of the plaintiffs and the witnesses, and the final pleadings took place from 15 February to 5 March 2021. a maximum possible sentence of 20 years. The Swiss Federal Prosecutor's Office (MPC) requested for Kosiah the maximum sentence of deprivation of liberty – 20 years – and deportation from Switzerland for 15 years, given the "extreme severity" of the crimes he is accused of committing.

A verdict is expected in a few weeks’ time.

=== Michel Desaedeleer ===
In 2015, Michel Desaedeleer, an American and Belgian citizen, was arrested indicted for enslavement, and pillage of blood diamonds in Sierra Leone. Desaedeleer's arrest was the first case ever on international crimes connected to suspected participation in the blood diamond trade. No trial ultimately took place as, shortly before it was due to start, Desaedeleer committed suicide in prison in Brussels.

=== Mohammed Jabbateh ===
In 2016, Mohammed Jabbateh (aka Jungle Jabbah) was arrested, indicted and charged by the US Attorney's Office for the Eastern District of Pennsylvania with two counts of fraud in immigration documents in violation of the 18 U.S.C. § 1546 and two counts of perjury in violation of 18 U.S.C. § 1621. Jabbateh pleaded "not guilty" on all counts. Jabbateh denied his involvement during the First Liberian Civil War when he sought asylum in the late 1990s. Jabbateh was sentenced to 30 years in prison on 19 April.

=== Agnes Reeves Taylor ===
In 2017, Agnes Reeves Taylor, ex-wife of Charles Taylor, was arrested by the Metropolitan Police and charged with torture on grounds of her suspected involvement with the NFPL during the First Liberian Civil War. On 6 December 2019, the Central Criminal Court in London decided that Agnes Taylor will not face trial in the UK. "The supreme court refined the interpretation of the law and in light of their judgement, the trial judge granted Agnes Taylor's application to dismiss the case against her. We will give careful consideration to that ruling," a CPS spokesperson commented.

=== Kunti K ===
In 2018, responding to an alert from Civitas Maxima, former Liberian warlord Kunti Kamara (aka "Kunti K.") was arrested for his alleged involvement in crimes against humanity committed during the First Liberian Civil War (1989–1996) while acting as a commander for the United Liberation Movement of Liberia for Democracy (ULIMO). He had been in pre-trial detention in Paris, but was released in September 2018 due to a procedural error. Kunti K. was subject to conditions of release, including being prohibited from leaving France. The French and Liberian authorities have continued carrying out investigations on the ground in Liberia. In January 2020, Kunti K. was rearrested by French authorities, after he violated the conditions placed on his release.

Kamara was indicted for crimes against humanity and acts of barbarity, and put on trial in the Paris courts, October 10 – November 2, 2022. He was convicted on all charges, and was sentenced to life in prison, with an additional symbolic award of 1 euro in "moral damages" awarded to the civil parties to the case.

=== Jucontee Thomas Woewiyu ===
In 2018, the trial of Jucontee Thomas Woewiyu took place at the United States District Court for the Eastern District of Pennsylvania at the James A. Byrne United States Courthouse. Woewiyu—co-founder, and for several years defense minister of Charles Taylor's National Patriotic Front of Liberia—became one of the few Liberian leaders to be arrested in the United States and charged with multiple counts of immigration fraud and perjury. After a trial in June 2018, featuring testimony from Liberian victims about the NPFL's crimes, he was convicted and found guilty on eleven counts of immigration-related perjury and fraud related to lying about his violent past. The sentencing hearing was scheduled for 15 October 2018 but has been postponed multiple times. Woewiyu was not in custody awaiting sentencing. He died on 12 April 2020 of COVID-19 after a week of treatment at the Bryn Mawr Hospital in Philadelphia, U.S.

=== Gibril Massaquoi ===
In 2020, Gibril Massaquoi, a former Revolutionary United Front (RUF) combatant of Sierra Leone, was arrested in Finland for war crimes and crimes against humanity allegedly committed in Liberia during the Second Liberian Civil War. On 1 February 2021 the Massaquoi's trial began, hardly two years after the opening of an investigation into this former Sierra Leonean warlord. The trial is expected to last until May, 2021. In a historic first, the Court is also travelling to Liberia and neighbouring Sierra Leone in mid-February 2021 to hear testimony from up to 80 witnesses and visit sites where the atrocities are alleged to have been carried out under Massaquoi's orders. Massaquoi was acquitted and awarded 390,000 euros in damages.
