= List of Amnesty International UK Media Awards winners =

Amnesty International
- Founded: July 1961 by Peter Benenson in Britain
- Type: Non-profit; NGO
- Location(s): Global; General secretariat in London
- Services: Protecting human rights
- Fields: Media attention, direct-appeal campaigns, research, lobbying
- Members: More than 3 million members and supporters
- Key people: Salil Shetty (Secretary-General)
- Website: www.amnesty.org
- Remarks: It is better to light a candle than to curse the darkness.

This is a list of the winners of the Amnesty International UK Media Awards for each year since 2002. These awards are given by the UK section of Amnesty International to journalists who have made a significant contribution to the UK public's greater awareness and understanding of human rights issues.

Earlier recipients of the Special Award for Human Rights Journalism under Threat included Ignacio Gomez of Colombia, special investigations editor of the newspaper El Espectador and director of the Colombian Press Freedom Foundation, who won the award in 2000; Najam Sethi of Pakistan, editor of the national newspaper, The Friday Times; and editor Nosa Igiebor and the staff of Nigeria's Tell Magazine.

== Award winners ==
Category	Title	Journalist	Organisation
2002
National newspaper	10-year-old Qwadrat takes his final painful breath	Anton Antonowicz	Daily Mirror
Periodical	The school of assassins that the US army has tried to hide	Christine Toomey	The Sunday Times Magazine
Photojournalism	War crimes in Kosovo	Gary Knight	Newsweek International
Radio	Crossing Continents - Israel/Palestine	Lucy Ash	BBC Radio 4
Television documentary	Kids behind bars	Kate Blewett / Brian Woods	True Vision Productions for the BBC
Television news	Slobodan Milosevic War Crimes Trial	Gaby Rado	ITN / Channel 4 News
2003
National newspaper	Inside the world of the Palestinian suicide bomber; The informer who could not escape; On patrol with the killer Israel dreads	Tallat Hussain	Dawn News
Periodical	Land of the damned	Ann McFerran	The Sunday Times Magazine
Photojournalism	Looking Aids in the face	Gideon Mendel	Corbis / Guardian Weekend
Radio	Today - Sale of illegal landmines	Andrew Gilligan	BBC Radio 4
Television documentary	Panorama - A licence to murder	John Ware	BBC
Television news	Guinea: sex for food	Sorious Samura	Insight News Television / Channel 4 News / CNN
Global human rights journalism	Invisible casualties of war	Belma Becirbasic / Dzenana Secic	Start magazine, Bosnia-Herzegovina
Human rights journalism under threat		Hassan Bility	Analyst newspaper, Liberia
Regional media	Series of articles on refugees and asylum seekers	Alexander Robertson / Sam Bartlett / Liam McDougall	The Big Issue, Scotland
2004
National newspaper	The People The Law Forgot	Tallat Hussain	Dawn News
Periodical	The Bitterest Betrayal	Vikram Dodd / Tania Branigan	Guardian Weekend Magazine
Photojournalism	Ghosts of the Apocalypse	Philip Blenkinsop	The Sunday Times Magazine
Radio	Crossing Continents - India	Lucy Ash	BBC Radio 4
Television documentary	This World - Access To Evil	Olenka Frenkiel	BBC
Television news	Equatorial Guinea	Lindsey Hilsum	Channel 4 News
Global human rights journalism	Slaves of the 21st Century	Raphael Gomide	O Dia, Brazil
Human rights journalism under threat		Kifle Mulat	Lissane Hizeb (Voice of the People), Ethiopia
Regional media	Asylum Seeking Children	Lorna Martin	The Herald, Scotland
Gaby Rado award	Reports from Democratic Republic of Congo	James Astill	The Guardian / The Observer / Newsnight
2005
National newspaper	London - the world in one city	Leo Benedictus	The Guardian
Periodical	America's Gulag	Stephen Grey	New Statesman
Photojournalism	Flames of Desperation	Nicola Kurtz	The Sunday Times Magazine
Radio	Bhopal	Susan Roberts	BBC Radio 4
Television documentary	Panorama - The New Killing Fields	Darren Kemp / Hilary Andersson	BBC
Television news	Falluja Forensics	Tara Sutton	Channel 4 News Independents' Fund / Guardian Films
Human rights journalism under threat		Marielos Monzón	Guatemala
Regional media	Fascism in Russia	Billy Briggs	The Herald Magazine on Saturday, Scotland
Gaby Rado award		Ali A Fadhil	Channel 4 News Independents' Fund / Guardian Films
2006
National newspaper	Iraq special report	Peter Beaumont	The Observer
Periodical	Beasts of prey	Christine Toomey	The Sunday Times Magazine
Photojournalism	Rwanda - facing the virus	Stuart Freedman	Positive Lives / Panos
Radio	Reports from rural China	Rupert Wingfield Hayes / Alistair Burnett	BBC Radio 4
Television documentary	Asylum	Amanda Richardson / Peter Gordon / Edwina Vardey / Nicola Clemens	BBC
Television news	Conflict - tin: Congo's tin soldiers	Elizabeth C Jones / Jonathan Miller / Mike Radford	Channel 4 News / ITN
Human rights journalism under threat		Stanislav Dmitrievskiy / Oksana Chelysheva	Russia
Regional media	Tales from the edge, the Glasgow girls	Lindsey Hill / Simon Parsons / Rhiannon Brady / Emma Green McInnes	BBC Scotland
Gaby Rado award	Human rights in the Former Soviet Union	Nick Paton Walsh	The Guardian
2007
National newspaper	Congo's Tragedy	Johann Hari	The Independent
Periodical	The Big Steal	Jonathan Watts	Guardian Weekend Magazine
Photojournalism	Acid attacks in Bangladesh	Andrew Testa	Foto 8 Magazine
Radio	Dispatches from Gaza	Alan Johnston	BBC News Gaza Bureau
Television documentary	Execution of a Teenage Girl	Paul Hamann / Monica Garnsey / Lucy Hetherington	BBC / Wild Pictures
Television news	China Organ Transplants	Rupert Wingfield-Hayes / Bessie Du / Al Go	BBC Ten O'Clock News
Human rights journalism under threat		Dina Meza	Revistazo, Honduras
Regional media	Haunted	Lucy Adams	The Herald Magazine, Scotland
Gaby Rado award	Tea and Kidnapping; You go a bit crazy when you see little body after little body coming up out of the ground; The Jihad now is against the Shias not the Americans	Ghaith Abdul-Ahad	The Guardian
2008
National newspaper	Iraqi interpreters series	Deborah Haynes	The Times
Periodical	Newspaper supplement: Selling soccer into slavery	Jonathan Green	Live (Mail on Sunday magazine)
Periodical	Consumer magazine: Russian media freedom	Fatima Tlisova / Sergei Bachinin / Alexei Simonov	Index on Censorship
Photojournalism	Congo unrest	Cédric Gerbehaye	Newsweek / Agence Vu
Radio	Today - Where there's muck: Mike Thomson in the Congo	Pascale Harter / Ceri Thomas / Mike Thompson	BBC Radio 4
Television documentary	Storyville - The Devil Came on Horseback	Gretchen Steidle Wallace / Jane Wells / Annie Sundberg / Ricki Stern / Nick Fraser / Brian Steidle	BBC Four / Break Thru Films / Global Grassroots
Television news	Too young to die - Children of the frontline	Chris Rogers / Deborah Turness / Tony Hemmings	ITV News / ITN
Human rights journalism under threat		Abdel Karim al-Khaiwani	Al-Shora, Yemen
Regional media	Congo to Motherwell	Fiona Walker / Dorothy Parker / Matt Pinder / Hilary McCusker-Thompson	BBC Scotland
Gaby Rado award	Africa's secret - the men, women and children 'vanished' in the war on terror	Xan Rice	The Guardian
International television and radio	The lost tribe - Secret army of the CIA	Eunice Lau / Stephanie Scawen / Tricia Tan / Tony Birtley	Al Jazeera English
New media	"Honour killing" sparks fears of new Iraqi conflict	Sahar Al-Haideri	Institute for War and Peace Reporting
2009
Gaby Rado memorial award		Aleem Maqbool	BBC News
International Television & Radio	World's Untold Stories: The Forgotten People	Dan Rivers, Kit Swartz, Sheri England, Anthony Whaley	CNN
Nations & Regions	The Fight for Justice	Lucy Adams	The Herald Magazine
National Newspapers	MI5 and the Torture Chambers of Pakistan	Ian Cobain	The Guardian
New Media	Kenya: The Cry of Blood - Extra Judicial Killings and Disappearances	Julian Assange	WikiLeaks
Periodicals - Consumer Magazines	The 'No Place for Children' campaign	Sir Al Aynsley Green, Gillian Slovo, Alice O'Keefe	New Statesman
Periodicals - Newspaper Supplements	Why do the Italians Hate Us?	Dan McDougall, Robin Hammond	The Observer Magazine
Photojournalism	No One Much Cares	Eugene Richards	Newsweek
Radio	Forgotten: The Central African Republic	Edward Main, Ceri Thomas, Mike Thomson	BBC Radio 4 - Today Programme
Television Documentary & Docudrama	Dispatches: Saving Africa's Witch Children	Mags Gavan, Joost Van der Valk, Alice Keens-Soper, Paul Woolwich	Channel 4 / Red Rebel Films / Southern Star Factual
Television News	Kiwanja Massacre: Congo	Ben De Pear, Jonathan Miller, Stuart Webb, Robert Chamwami	Channel 4 News / ITN
2010
Special Award 2010		All the independent media workers of Burma	
Gaby Rado Memorial Award		Jamal Osman	Channel 4 News
International Television & Radio	People and Power: Ingushetia - A Second Chechnya?	Antony Butts, Dom Rotheroe, Mike Chamberlain	Al Jazeera
Nations & Regions	Discrimination: Migrant Workers Rental Block	Guy Lynn, Mark Hayman, David Weller	BBC Look North
National Newspapers	The Dark Side of Dubai	Johann Hari	The Independent
Digital Media	Chinese Petitioners	Jamil Anderlini, Edward Cheng	Financial Times
Periodicals - Consumer Magazines	Congo: The Horror	Ed Caesar, Susan Schulman	GQ
Periodicals - Newspaper Supplements	The Return of the Bloody Diamonds	Dan McDougall, Robin Hammond	Live Magazine
Photojournalism	Toxic Jeans	Robin Hammond	Sunday Times
Radio	Zimbabwe: What Mugabe Didn't Tell Us	Mike Thomson, Edward Prendeville, Ceri Thomas	BBC Radio 4 - Today Programme
Television Documentary & Docudrama	Burma VJ (JOINT WINNER); Dispatches: Afghanistan's Dirty War (JOINT WINNER)	Lise-Lense Moller, Anders Ostergaard; Tom Roberts, Peter Lindley, Najibullah Razaq	More 4 / Magic Hour Films; Channel 4 / October Films
Television News	The End of Sri Lanka's War	Jonathan Miller, Nick Paton Walsh, Nevine Mabro, Bessie Du, Matt Jasper, Ben de Pear	Channel 4 News / ITN
