= Kunti Kamara =

Former Liberian rebel militia commander

Kunti Kamara, a.k.a. Kunti Kumara, Kunti K., Colonel Kamara, CO Kamara ("Commanding Officer Kamara") or Co Kamara, whose real name may be Awaliho Soumaworo, is a former Liberian rebel militia commander who participated in the First Liberian Civil War as a leader in the United Liberation Movement of Liberia for Democracy (ULIMO).

In 2018, he was arrested in France—under the doctrine of universal jurisdiction for crimes against humanity—and charged in a French court for acts of barbarity including torture, cannibalism, forced labour and complicity in crimes against humanity during that Liberian war, and put on trial starting October 10, 2022, in a Paris court. The trial was the first of its kind in France against an alleged Liberian war criminal.

In November 2022, Kunti Kamara was found guilty of complicity in crimes against humanity, and acts of barbarity, during 1993 and 1994, and sentenced to life imprisonment by the Paris court in France. The trial began on March 6, 2024.

== Biography ==
=== Origin and nationality ===
Kamara was born in December 1974 in Liberia. He is a Liberian with Dutch nationality through citizenship acquired in the early 2000s. He is reportedly of the Mandingo ethnic group.

=== First Liberian Civil War ===
==== Background ====
The First Liberian Civil War (1989–1996) was, in combination with the immediately following Second Liberian Civil War, one of the bloodiest conflicts in modern African history, with an estimated 250,000 people—mostly civilians—killed, many in massacres. Many more were maimed, raped, tortured or exploited as forced labor. Many children were forced into combat. Allegedly, the wide range of atrocities were committed by all sides in the conflict.

==== Kamara's involvement ====
During the War, Kamara was (by his own admission) a local commander of the United Liberation Movement of Liberia for Democracy (ULIMO) – one of the three rebel militias fighting against the National Patriotic Front of Liberia (NPFL) of Charles Taylor. Kamara has admitted to being a battlefield commander, of about 80 soldiers, during that war – saying that he did so to defend himself against the NPFL.

In 1993–1994, while not yet 20 years old, Kamara allegedly commanded a ULIMO unit in the northwestern Liberian region of Lofa County where he was allegedly complicit "in massive and systematic torture [along with] inhumane acts" – including allowing and abetting, with his authority, rapes and sexual torture, and also compelling people into forced labor in inhumane conditions (including keeping women as sex slaves).

In one specific incident – later cited as evidence of his involvement in cannibalism – he allegedly was involved in cutting open a victim's chest with an axe, so the victim's heart could be extracted and eaten.

Kamara has denied all the charges.

In 1994, ULIMO split into two factions: the ethnic-Krahn ULIMO-J, and the ethnic-Mandingo ULIMO-K (headed by Alhaji G.V. Kromah). Kamara was a commander in ULIMO-K.

==== Wars' end and aftermath ====
The war was followed shortly by the Second Liberian Civil War (1999–2003), ended by the 2003 flight of Liberian President Charles Taylor to Nigeria, and the 2003 Accra Comprehensive Peace Agreement (CPA) enforced by the United Nations Mission in Liberia and United States Marines.

A national Truth and Reconciliation Commission (TRC), and Liberian courts, failed to bring any of the guilty responsible to trial, so the international community began to consider trying alleged Liberian war criminals in foreign countries, under the doctrine of universal jurisdiction, which asserts that crimes against humanity, wherever they are perpetrated, can be prosecuted and punished in any other country in the world, regardless of the accused's nationality or their country of residence. Charles Taylor was convicted in a court in Sierra Leone—the first head of state convicted of war crimes since the Nuremberg War Crimes Trials after World War II. Others were tried and convicted in the United States, France and Switzerland.

=== Postwar life ===
In 1997, Kamara traveled to the Netherlands, living there for 12 years. He worked as an electrician and acquired Dutch citizenship. He then moved to Belgium, and then France in 2016. At that time, Dutch investigators were looking into suspects in Liberia's civil war.

=== Arrest, indictment and trial ===
==== Arrest and indictment ====
France's Code of Criminal Procedure, Sec. 689-11, says that any citizen, or non-citizen, can be tried [in French courts] for international crimes against humanity, if those crimes were illegal in the country where they happened and the accused is a resident of France.

Civitas Maxima, a swiss NGO which documents international crimes and provides the victims with juridic support in their quest for justice, alerted French authorities about Kamara's case in 2018. The Liberian government – although it has declined to prosecute any Liberian war criminals since the end of the country's civil wars – cooperated with the investigation.

Kamara was arrested in the suburbs of Paris, France, September 4, 2018. He was released due to a procedural error, but put under investigation, and rearrested in 2020 while reportedly attempting to leave the country.

He was indicted in a French court, November 2020, for war crimes and crimes against humanity during the Liberian war. The indictment specifically accused Kamara of complicity in...

"...massive and systematic practice of torture or inhumane acts, inspired by political, philosophical, racial or religious motives and organized as part of a concerted plan against a civilian population group".

These acts are reportedly qualified as "crimes against humanity."

Rapes which had happened in 1993 – before French law, in 1994, explicitly recognized them as "crimes against humanity" – were among the charges, but were labeled in the indictment as acts of torture, rather than as rapes, to get around the date limitations of the law. Karmara's defense lawyer denounced the scheme as "legal acrobatics," though the prosecutor insisted it was reality.

==== Trial ====
Kamara's trial – in the crimes against humanity division of the Paris court (variously reported as the Paris Assize Court or the Paris Appeals Court) – was set to begin November 8, 2022, but began October 10, 2022. It was expected to last until November 4, 2022. A 10-member jury was empaneled to judge the case.

Kamara denied all the charges – particularly the charge of cannibalism.

The four-week trial was to include testimony of more than 36 witnesses and experts, some brought from Liberia by the French prosecutors. Among the witnesses at the trial were three men and a woman reportedly in Lofa County when the crimes allegedly took place. Kamara has denied knowing the witnesses.

Also testifying was former ULIMO senior officer Alieu Kosiah, who had been convicted in June 2021 of similar Liberian war crimes in a Swiss court, largely due to testimony by Kamara. Kosiah, whose appeal in the Swiss courts is still pending, spent most of his time testifying to his own innocence – mentioning little about Kamara, but noting that Kamara had been involved in the capture of the Lofa County town of Foya, in the summer of 1993 (which Kamara deines) and that Kamara had probably been based there for months afterward.

While testifying, Kosiah protested the French court's relevance, questioning a European court's capacity to judge the events in Liberia, complaining that the prosecution does not understand those events, adding "I think this case is too complicated to be judged by white people."

Kamara's legal defense team questioned the credibility of the evidence against him, none of which was physical evidence, and which almost solely consisted of various witnesses' testimony, some of which was contradictory.

On October 31, the state prosecutor asked the court to sentence Kamara to life in prison.

On November 2, Kamara was allowed to make his final remarks, and only said "I have nothing to say except that I am innocent today, I will be innocent tomorrow. I was a simple soldier."

=== Conviction and sentence ===
On November 2, 2022, the Paris court concluded the case, having convicted Kunti Kamara as guilty of all charges against him, including crimes against civilians, committed between 1993 and 1994 – including complicity in crimes against humanity and acts of barbarity. The crimes for which Kamara were convicted included torture; cannibalism (eating the heart of a teacher), executing a sick woman for witchcraft; rape and sexual slavery, of particularly vulnerable people, committed by his subordinates; not preventing his soldiers from raping two teenage girls repeatedly; and forced labour under inhumane conditions.

The court sentenced Kamara to life in prison. It also awarded 1 euro in moral damages, as a symbolic gesture, at the request of the civil parties. French law prohibits larger such awards to foreigners. The trial began on March 6, 2024. On March 27, 2024, the court sentenced Kunti Kamara to 30 years in prison for “crimes against humanity”.

=== Precedent ===
According to multiple sources, Kamara's arrest was the first in France in which a ULIMO member was charged with international crimes allegedly committed during Liberia's civil wars, and his trial is France's first extra-territorial trial for international crimes.

However, the Associated Press reported that "the Paris trial... is [France's] fifth [about] crimes against humanity and torture... Previous cases [were about] the 1994 genocide in Rwanda." The Guardian and France 24 report that the trial "is the first [in France] of a non-Rwandan suspect [charged with] wartime atrocities since [France set up its] special crimes against humanity tribunal... in Paris in 2012."

Human rights lawyer Alain Werner, director of the civic group Civitas Maxima (which had been a party to the prosecution), said the trial indicated that there is legal recourse possible for victims of atrocities – even if committed in conflicts long-forgotten, noting the relevance of the case to the ongoing Russian invasion of Ukraine at the time of the trial.

In a joint statement released immediately following Kamara's conviction, Human Rights Watch, Amnesty International France, and International Federation for Human Rights (FIDH) declared:

"The conviction of a former Liberian rebel commander for wartime atrocities in Liberia by a French court is a milestone in delivering justice for victims, and for France’s efforts to hold those responsible for grave crimes to account."

The statement further emphasized the international significance of the event for its...

- Application of the doctrine of "universal jurisdiction over certain serious [violations of] international law, [permitting] prosecution of these crimes [regardless of] where they were committed [or] the nationality of... suspects or victims"; and
- "Rare" role in "convictions for war crimes, [or] crimes against humanity, or torture [that happened] during Liberia’s civil war era."
