= Toomey =

Toomey is a surname, and may refer to:

== People ==
- Bill Toomey (born 1939), American Olympic track and field athlete
- George Toomey (1873–c.1932), American college football coach
- Harold D. Toomey (1898–1953), New York politician
- Jenny Toomey (born 1968), American rock musician and arts activist
- Jim Toomey (born 1960), American syndicated cartoonist (Sherman's Lagoon)
- Marie Toomey (fl. 1946–1950), Australian tennis player
- Nicole Toomey (born 2002), New Zealand international lawn bowler
- Pat Toomey (born 1961), Republican politician from Pennsylvania; U.S. representative 1999–2005 and U.S. senator 2011–2023
- Paul Toomey (born 1956) American professional soccer player
- Regis Toomey (1898–1991), American film and television actor
- Brother Cleve (born Robert Toomey; 1955–2002), American musician and mixologist
- Robyn Toomey (born 1964), New Zealand field hockey player
- Sean Toomey (born 1979), American professional ice hockey player
- Timothy J. Toomey, Jr. (born 1953), American politician from Massachusetts; state legislator since 1992
- Tia-Clair Toomey (born 1993) Australian weightlifter and CrossFit athlete
- Christine Toomey, British journalist

== Fictional characters ==
- Claire Toomey, character in the British soap opera Family Affairs
- Craig Toomey, character in the American sci-fi miniseries The Langoliers
