= National Patriotic Front =

National Patriotic Front may refer to:

- Front of Patriotic and National Parties (Syria)
- Independent National Patriotic Front of Liberia
- National Patriotic Front of Liberia
- National Patriotic Front of Liberia – Central Revolutionary Council
- National Patriotic Front (Moldova)
- National Patriotic Front (Namibia)
- Patriotic and Democratic Front of the Great National Union of Kampuchea (Cambodia)
- National Patriotic Front (Zimbabwe)
- National Patriotic Front (Wales)
