= K5 Plan =

Vast defensive belt along the Cambodian-Thai border

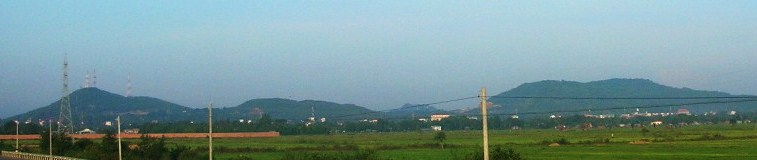
Mountains along the Cambodia–Thailand border north of the road between Sisophon and Aranyaprathet. One of the areas where Khmer Rouge insurgents hid at the time of the PRK/SOC.

The K5 Plan (Khmer: ផែនការក៥), K5 Belt or K5 Project, also known as the Bamboo Curtain, was an attempt between 1985 and 1989 by the government of the People's Republic of Kampuchea to seal Khmer Rouge guerrilla infiltration routes into Cambodia by means of trenches, wire fences, and minefields along virtually the entire Cambodia–Thailand border.

== Background ==
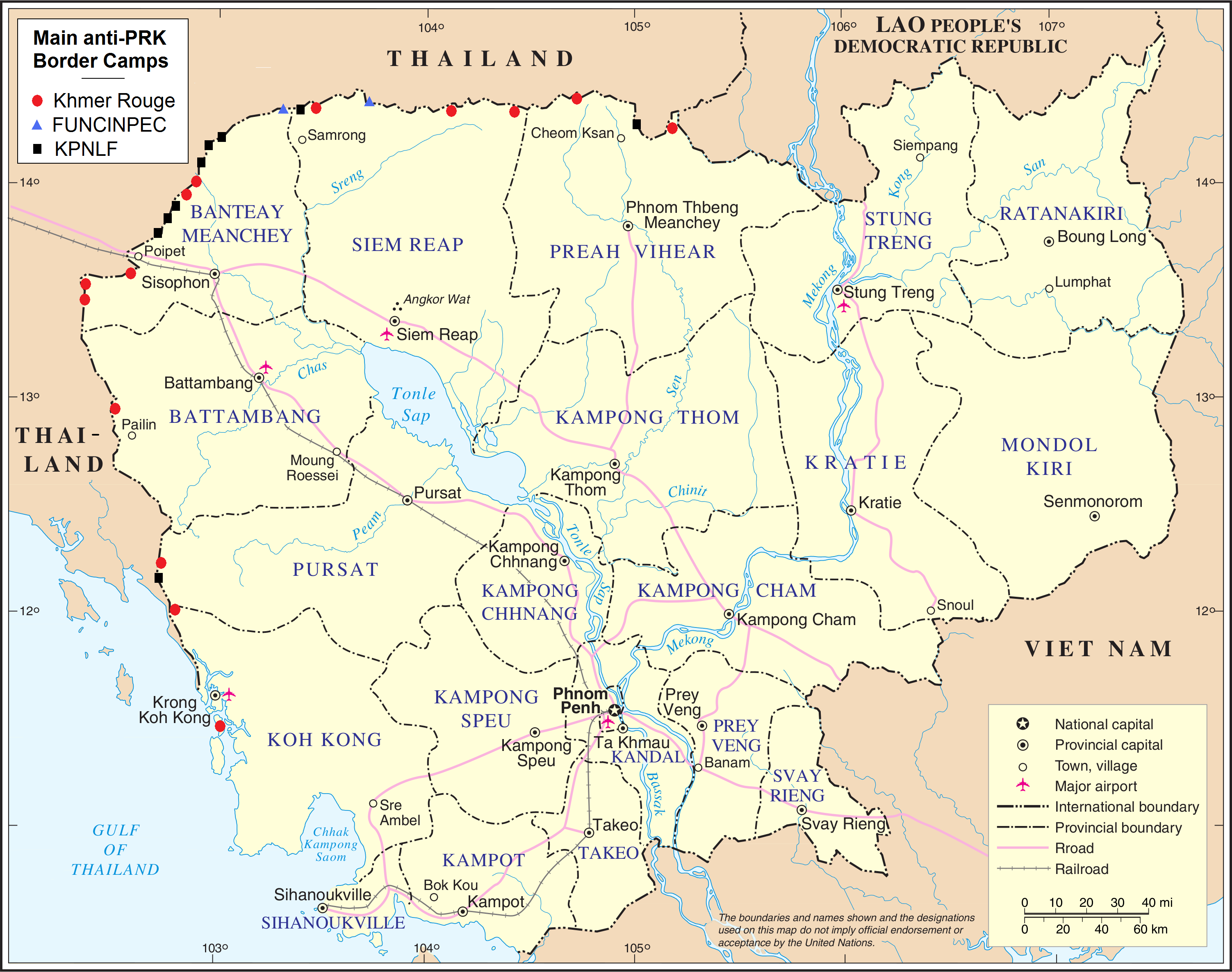
Border camps hostile to the PRK; 1979-1984

After the defeat of Democratic Kampuchea in 1979, the Khmer Rouge fled Cambodia quickly. Protected by the Thai state, and with powerful foreign connections, Pol Pot's virtually intact militia of about 30,000 to 35,000 troops regrouped and reorganized in forested and mountainous zones behind the Thai-Cambodian border. During the early 1980s Khmer Rouge forces showed their strength in Thailand, inside the refugee camps near the border, and were able to receive a steady and abundant supply of military equipment. The weapons came mainly from China and the US and were channeled across Thailand with the cooperation of the Royal Thai Armed Forces.

From their position of security in hidden military outposts along the Thai border, the Khmer Rouge militias launched a relentless military campaign against the newly established People's Republic of Kampuchea state. Even though the Khmer Rouge was dominant, it fought against the Kampuchean People's Revolutionary Armed Forces (KPRAF) and Vietnam People's Army along with minor non-communist armed factions which had formerly been fighting against the Khmer Rouge between 1975 and 1979.

The border war followed a wet season / dry season rhythm. Generally, the heavily armed Vietnamese forces conducted offensive operations during the dry seasons, and the Chinese-backed Khmer Rouge held the initiative during the rainy seasons. In 1982, Vietnam launched a largely unsuccessful offensive against the main Khmer Rouge base at Phnom Malai in the Cardamom Mountains.

The major consequence of the border civil war was that the PRK was hampered in its efforts to rebuild the much-damaged nation and consolidate its administration. The new republic's rule was tenuous in the border areas owing to persistent sabotage by the Khmer Rouge of the provincial administrative system through constant guerrilla warfare.

== Implementation ==
The architect of the K5 plan was Vietnamese general Lê Đức Anh, commander of the PAVN forces in Cambodia. He formulated five key points for the defence of Cambodia against Khmer Rouge re-infiltration. Letter "K", the first letter of the Khmer alphabet, came from kar karpier, meaning 'defence' in the Khmer language, and number "5" referred to Le Duc Anh's five points in his plan of defence, of which the sealing of the border with Thailand was the second point. Many workers on the project, however, did not know what "K5" stood for.

The K5 Plan began on 19 July 1984. It became a gigantic effort that included clearing long patches of tropical forest by felling a great number of trees, as well as slashing and uprooting tall vegetation. The purpose was to leave a continuous broad open space all along the Thai border that would be watched and mined.

In practice the K5 fence consisted of a roughly 700 km-long, 500 m-wide swath of land along the border with Thailand, where antitank and antipersonnel mines were buried to a density of about 3,000 mines per kilometre of frontage.

== Consequences ==
From the environmental viewpoint the massive felling of trees was an ecological disaster, contributing to acute deforestation, the endangerment of species, and leaving behind a vast degraded area. The more remote places, like the Cardamom Mountains had been relatively untouched by man until they became a stronghold of the Khmer Rouge in the 1980s. Presently these mountains are an endangered ecoregion.

Unforeseen by the planners of the project, from the military point of view the K5 Plan was also disastrous for the PRK. It did not deter the Khmer Rouge fighters who found ways to cross it, for it was impossible to effectively police the long border. Besides, maintenance was difficult, as the razed jungle left a scruffy undergrowth that, in the tropical climate, would grow again yearly to about a man's height.

The K5 Plan was counterproductive for the image of the PRK, as a republic bent on reconstructing what the rule of Pol Pot and his Communist Party of Kampuchea had destroyed in Cambodia. Despite the magnitude of the effort, the whole project was ultimately unsuccessful and ended up playing into the hands of the enemies of the new pro-Hanoi republic. Thousands of Cambodian peasants, who despite the Vietnamese invasion had welcomed their release from the Khmer Rouge's interference in traditional farming and the absence of taxes under the PRK government, became disgruntled.

They were angry at having to abandon their farms in order to dedicate time to clear the jungle, heavy toil they perceived as useless and unfruitful. Their resentment grew in time as they perceived the forced labor to be, albeit without the killings, very similar to what they had experienced under the Khmer Rouge. Owing to unsanitary conditions and the abundance of mosquitoes in areas of difficult access, badly fed and badly lodged workers on the K5 project fell victim to malaria and exhaustion.

Many of the mines remain to this day, making the vast area dangerous. The K5 zone became part of the great landmine problem in Cambodia after the end of the civil war. In 1990 alone, the number of Cambodians that had a leg or foot amputated as a result of an injury caused by a land mine reached around 6,000.

== See also ==
- People's Republic of Kampuchea
- Kampuchean People's Revolutionary Armed Forces
- Vietnamese border raids in Thailand
