= Nick Paton Walsh =

British journalist (born 1977)

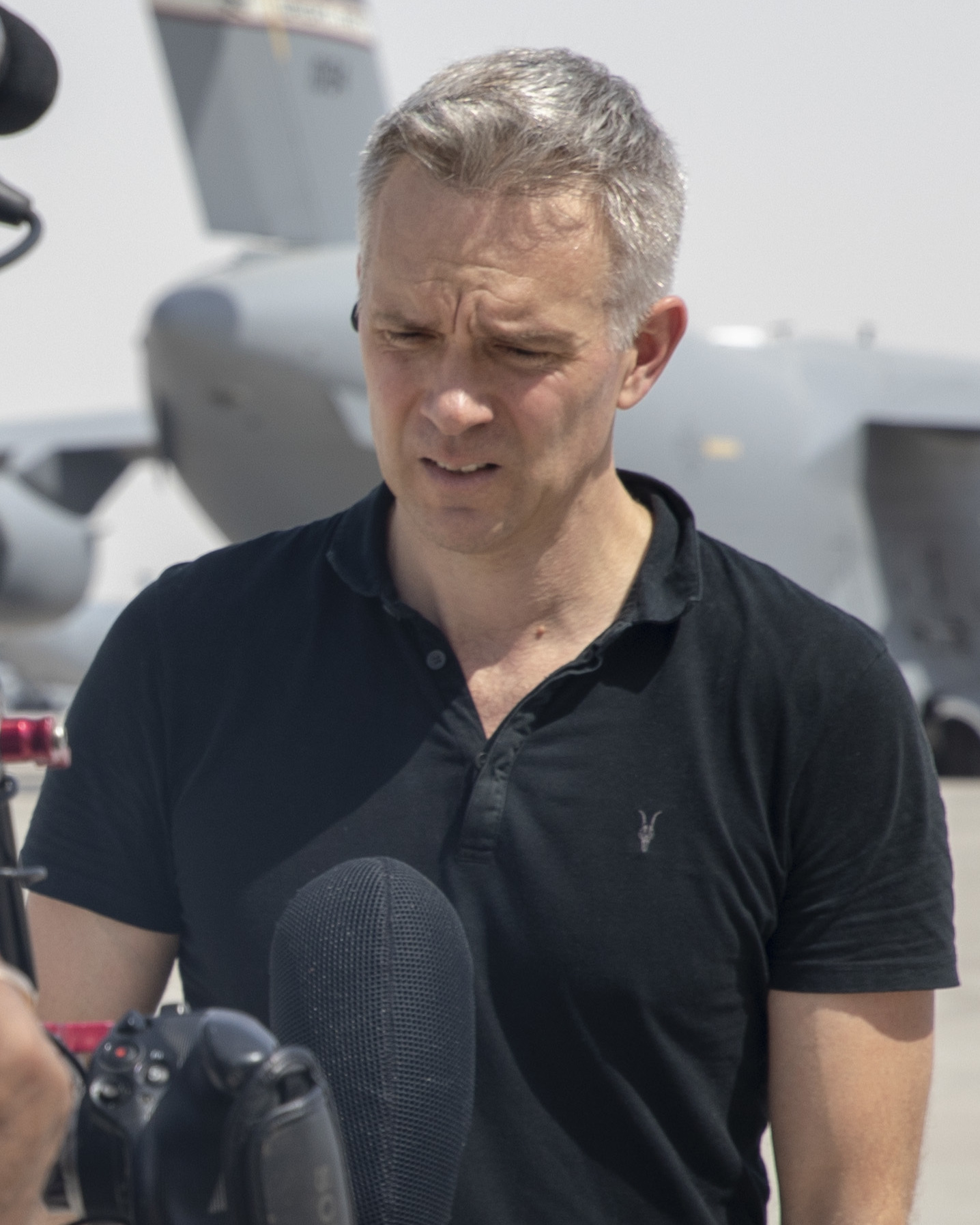
- Walsh in 2021
- Born: 1977 (age 48–49)
- Occupation: Journalist
- Employer: CNN

Nick Paton Walsh (born 1977) is a British journalist who is CNN's International Security Editor. He has been CNN's Kabul Correspondent, an Asia and foreign affairs correspondent for the UK's Channel 4 News, and Moscow correspondent for The Guardian newspaper.

== Education ==
Paton Walsh was born in Guildford, Surrey. and educated at Epsom College, a boarding independent school in the town of Epsom, also in Surrey, followed by University College London.

== Professional background ==
=== Television career ===
Paton Walsh began working for CNN in March 2011 in Pakistan. He covered the death of Osama bin Laden as their first reporter in country to the story, entering the fugitive's former compound and breaking the news that cellphone signals had led the Central Intelligence Agency (CIA) to the al-Qaeda leader.

Paton Walsh covered American President Barack Obama's speech about the withdrawal of America's troops from Afghanistan, detailing a Taliban resurgence in Nuristan Province, a booming opium culture in Badakhshan Province, together with insurgent violence and a resurgent al-Qaeda in Kunar. He also reported from Benghazi on Libya's declaration of liberty after Gaddafi was deposed. In September he became CNN's full-time correspondent in Kabul.

He moved to Beirut in August 2012, from where Paton Walsh began covering the civil war in Syria. He reported from inside Aleppo on the fate of a 4-year-old girl hit by a sniper, the aftermath of an airstrike on a family home, Aleppo airstrikes, and the protracted battle for 100 yards of a street in the Old City. The reports helped win CNN a Peabody, two Edward R Murrow Awards, and a News and Documentary Emmy Award for Individual Achievement in a Craft – Writing.

Paton Walsh reported from Dagestan on the family of the alleged Boston Bombers, and from Turkey during weeks of unrest over the planned demolition of Gezi Park. He joined Channel Four News at ITN as a foreign affairs correspondent from the Guardian newspaper in September 2006. He covered the Iraq surge both from Washington and Baghdad, and reported from Mosul and Basra. He interviewed Russian murder suspect Andrey Lugovoy, on the day the Russian businessman was charged by British police with the murder of Alexander Litvinenko; worked in Chechnya and Ingushetia; covered child soldiers in the Central African Republic; and climate change in Tajikistan.

While based in London, Paton Walsh uncovered a series of exclusives for the programme, including the British use of incendiary bombs in Afghanistan; a covert British programme to train the special forces of regimes considered to have questionable human rights records; and Sebastian Coe's controversial description of the Chinese policemen who guided the Olympic torch through London as "thugs".

Paton Walsh was the programme's undercover correspondent in Zimbabwe, during the 2008 elections. He was one of a handful of western reporters inside the country during the violent crackdown on the MDC. He also reported the war between Georgia and Russia in July 2008 from both sides of the front line.

In September 2008, Paton Walsh moved to Bangkok, to become the programme's Asia correspondent. During the Mumbai hotel sieges that November, he got the first interview with the Australian barman held in the Taj Hotel.

Channel Four News ran the first interview in seven years in March 2009 with alleged Russian arms dealer Viktor Bout. The product of six months of negotiations by Paton Walsh, the interview took place in his remand centre and at the courthouse, where he was facing extradition to the United States. Bout professed his innocence, but also admitted his planes could have run weapons without his knowledge; that he ran guns for the Afghan government in the 1990s; and said he was close personal friends with Jean Pierre Bemba, an alleged warlord on trial in the Hague for crimes against humanity.

Along with his colleagues in a Channel Four News team in Sri Lanka during April 2009, Paton Walsh was deported for their reporting on allegations from the United Nations about sexual abuse in camps of those internally displaced there. The other members of the team, including producers Nevine Mabro and Bessie Du, along with cameraman Matt Jasper, had been one of a handful to report the end of the 25-year war when the military closed in on a tiny strip of land, filled with civilians, in the country's north east, called the No Fire Zone. After three weeks of coverage, the team ran footage secretly filmed inside the camps, into which Tamil civilians fleeing the fighting had been held. The report so enraged the country's defence minister, Gotabaya Rajapaksa, that he personally rang Paton Walsh to inform him he and his team would be deported. They were held by police and then taken to the airport, causing the allegations in his report to gain international attention.

While serving as an Asia correspondent, Paton Walsh worked extensively in Afghanistan, including the presidential election crisis of 2009. Embedded across the country in Orūzgān, Helmand, Paktika, Khost, Nurestan, Kunar, and Kandahar, he gained rare access to COP Keating in Nurestan, a tiny American outpost isolated near the Pakistani border, which was overrun by insurgents in October 2009. Paton Walsh interviewed General Stanley McChrystal, the NATO commander removed for injudicious comments about his civilian superiors. Perhaps presciently, McCrystal told Walsh, when referring to President Hamid Karzai's recent outbursts, "war is high stress stuff" that often causes people to say rash things.

In a series of exclusives about the British army's conduct in Afghanistan, Paton Walsh revealed the dissatisfaction felt by Afghans who had worked for the UK military as translators in Helmand – men who had been injured on duty but who felt abandoned. He revealed a trebling in compensation payouts to civilians in Helmand over deaths or injuries mistakenly caused by British forces.

Paton Walsh spent many months in Pakistan, where he reported on the Taliban's infiltration of Karachi, and on the military's campaign to take Bajaur. His team broadcast the first mobile phone footage of a woman being flogged publicly by the Taliban in the Swat Valley, which caused popular outcry in Pakistan.

Paton Walsh has also organised and reported interviews with Taliban leaders Mansoor Dadullah and Mullah Nasir.

Paton Walsh has also worked on vigilante murders and economic booms in China; on mud volcanoes in Indonesia; migrant workers in Dubai; food exportation from Cambodia; Naxalite rebels in Chhattisgarh, India; and he watched and reported as his office and flat were surrounded by the protests that shook Bangkok in May 2010.

In April 2023, he covered the migrant trek through the Darien Gap in the premiere of the CNN primetime series The Whole Story with Anderson Cooper.

In August 2024, Russia’s Federal Security Service initiated a criminal case against Paton Walsh for illegally crossing Russia’s border. He was accused of unlawfully crossing the Russia–Ukraine border and filming reports in the Sudzha area of the Kursk Oblast where he was escorted by the Ukrainian military to report on Ukraine’s cross-border incursion and occupation, at the invitation of the Ukrainian government. In October 2024, a Russian court after a trial in absentia, ordered that "Paton Walsh be arrested while on Russian territory or upon extradition" for reporting from Ukrainian-held territory.

=== Newspaper career ===
Paton Walsh joined The Observer newspaper in 1999, after studying English at University College London, where he has run the Guardian's "Me and My Motor" column, in which celebrities spoke each week about their car.

Paton Walsh began at the Observer as a researcher on the travel and film sections, before winning the Young Journalist of the Year award from the British Press Gazette. The winning articles included one on nuclear testing in Kazakhstan, another on male anorexia, and one on getting malaria in Gambia. The award secured him a place on the home news desk where he worked for 18 months before accepting voluntary redundancy to go and work as the newspaper's stringer in Moscow. He quickly became the Guardian and Observer Moscow correspondent, which position he held for four years. During that time he was one of two journalists to get inside the grounds of the Nord Ost theatre at the close of the Dubrovka theatre siege in October 2002.

Paton Walsh covered the popular revolutions in Georgia, Ukraine, and Kyrgyzstan, and their failure in Azerbaijan and Belarus. He was also the Guardian's only correspondent in Beslan for the brutal hostage crisis at Middle School Number One there. He worked repeatedly inside the North Caucasus, travelling to Chechnya over twenty times and winning various awards for his reporting there.

Paton Walsh helped break this story of the disciplining of Craig Murray, the then British Ambassador to Uzbekistan, who spoke out against the British invasion of Iraq. He also secured the ambassador's first interview for the Guardian and Channel Four News.

Paton Walsh has won a series of awards since joining the staff of The Observer newspaper, aged 21. In 2000 he was the British Press Gazette's Young Journalist of the Year, and four years later was nominated for their Foreign Correspondent award for the Guardian's coverage of the Beslan school hostage crisis.

Paton Walsh won Amnesty International's Gaby Rado Award for a reporter at the start of their career in 2006 for his work in the former Soviet Union, and their television award for his work in Sri Lanka in 2010. He won the Lorenzo Natali Prize for human rights reporting in 2006.

In February 2011, Paton Walsh's work in Kandahar, Afghanistan was part of a body of reports that won Channel Four News the prestigious Broadcast television award for news and current affairs coverage.
