= Abdel Karim al-Khaiwani =

Yemeni politician, humans rights activist and journalist

- عبدالكريم الخيواني
- Born: 1965; Taiz, Taiz Governorate, Yemen
- Died: 18 March 2015 (aged 49–50); Hayal Street, Sana'a, Yemen
- Cause of death: Drive-by shooting
- Other name: Abdul Karim Muhammed Al-Khaiwani
- Education: Sana'a University
- Occupations: Journalist, columnist, editor, Goodwill Ambassador of the International Council for Human Rights in Yemen
- Years active: unknown-2015
- Employer(s): formerly editor of Al-Umma and Al Shoura
- Known for: criticism on the Yemeni government and it's wars on Sa'ada
- Relatives: Mohammed al-Khewani (son)
- Awards: Amnesty International's 2008 Special Award for Human Rights Journalism under Threat

Abdel Karim al-Khaiwani (Arabic: عبدالكريم الخيواني), also known as Abdul Karim Muhammed al-Khaiwani, (1965 – 18 March 2015) was a Yemeni politician, human rights activist, and journalist, columnist and editor, who was known for his critical articles pertaining to the civil rights abuses and government corruption of the Yemeni government. He was assassinated in his hometown of Sana'a, Yemen because, according to Freedom Foundation Yemen, he was politically outspoken.

== Personal ==
Abdul Karim al-Khaiwani was born in Taiz, Taiz Governorate, Yemen in 1965. As a student at Sana'a University, he studied political science and economics. He was a member of the Al-Haq Party that was known as one of the opposition political parties of Yemen. He was a member of a National Dialogue Conference. He became a goodwill ambassador of the International Council for Human Rights in Yemen.

== Career ==
He was a former editor-in-chief for both Al-Umma, the Al-Haq party newspaper, and Al Shoura, a pro-democracy newspaper. In his journalism, al-Khaiwani was a harsh critic on the President Ali Abdullah Saleh's response to the conflict between the north and the central government in the Saada Governorate. For that he was harassed for years; he was abducted and beaten, received death threats, and imprisoned. In 2004, al-Khaiwani was sentenced to one year in jail on charges of incitement, insulting the president, publishing false news, and causing disruptive tribal and sectarian sentiments. In 2007, in response to an article he had written concerning human rights violations in Yemen, al-Khaiwani was abducted, beaten, and threatened with death by gunmen if he continued to publish. Also that year, the journalist's home was raided after a counter-terrorist team gained access to his home by posing as electricians. While making the arrests, they struck his 7-year-old daughter and knocked her unconscious, as well as beat al-Khaiwani with the butts of their guns before taking him to prison. Police found materials that were widely available about the government's fight against rebels in Saada along with an unpublished article he had written criticizing the president. This resulted in his arrest and he was accused of conspiring with anti-government rebels. He was on trial for sedition in 2008, found guilty, and sentenced to 6 years. President Saleh pardoned him 3 months later, but a special court that hears terrorism cases sentenced him back to 6 years, which resulted in another presidential pardon 14 March 2009.

== Assassination ==
Abdel Karim al-Khaiwani was born in Taiz. Sana'a, is the capital city of Yemen and the site of his murder.

On 18 March 2015, Abdulkarim al-Khaiwani was gunned down in front of his house by three armed men on motor bikes. There was a witness, but she was unable to identify the men. Reports say al-Khaiwani was hit with seven bullets. He was also gunned down by unidentified men who fled on motor vehicles. Al-Qaeda later claimed responsibility for the attack through an online Twitter account saying that two mujahideen riding motorcycles opened fire on Abdul Karim al-Khaiwani and the gunmen had fled the scene successfully. Al-Khaiwani was rushed to the Science and Technology Hospital on Al-Siteen Street, where he was later pronounced dead. The details of the shooting strikingly resemble the assassination of political activist Muhamed Abd al-Malik al-Mutawakel in November 2014.

== Context ==
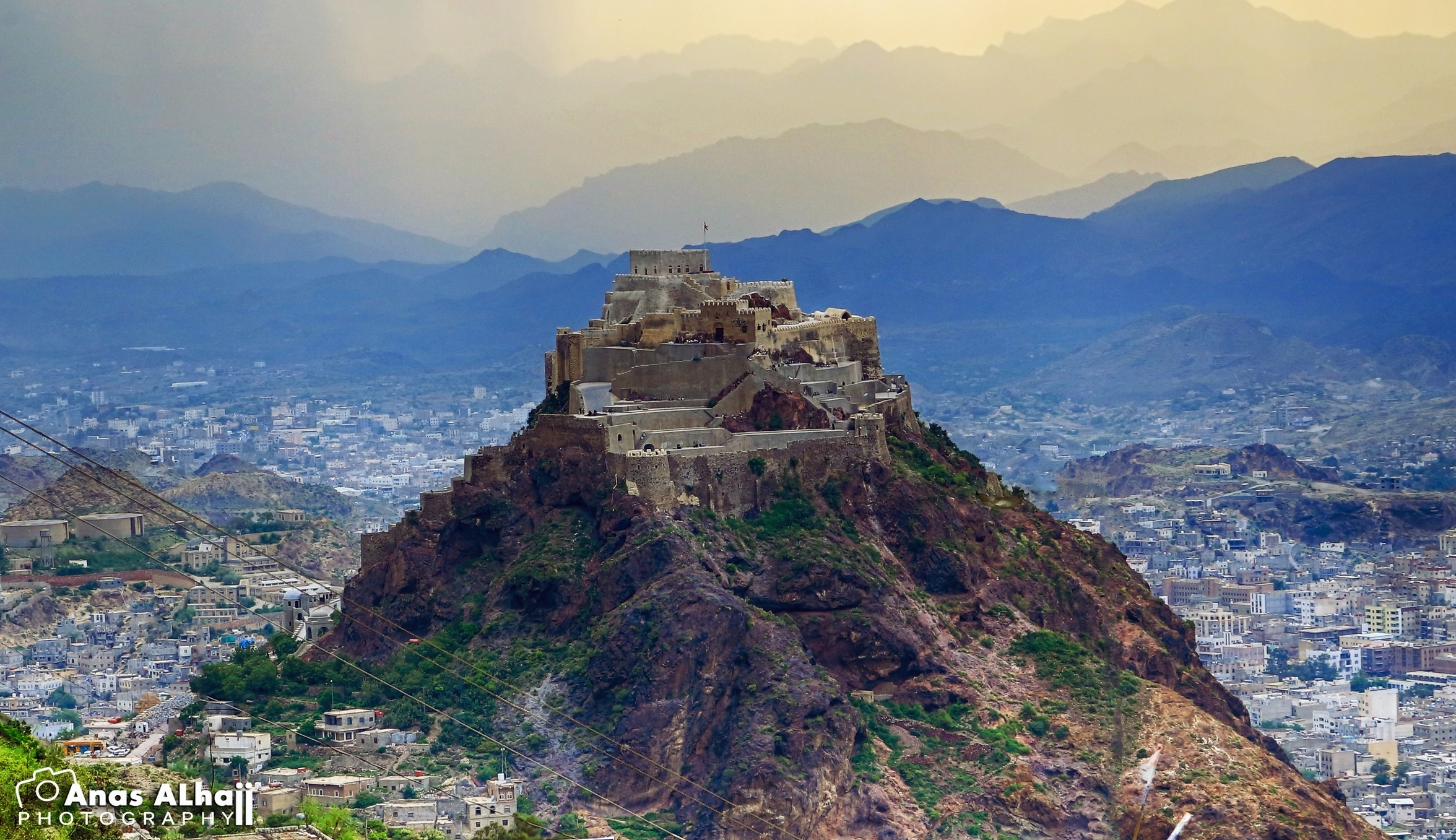
Abdel Karim al-Khaiwani is from Taiz, which is pictured.

Abdul Karim al-Khaiwani was fighting against an entrenched system of media oppression. Yemen was ranked 167th in terms of Freedom of the Press. Yemen's ranking in the Annual Worldwide Press Freedom Index from 136th of 167 in 2005 to 168 out of 180 and it ranks 153 out of 177 countries on the UN's human-development index which measures things like education and life expectancy.

With the Saada war raging in northern Yemen, his news platform was blocked in Yemen

because we are criticizing corruption, the prejudices of rights and freedoms, and our continuing need for political and cultural reforms and good governance

During the conflict, the government has refused access to journalists or independent observers. The government has censored the reports. During the Arab Spring movement in Yemen, al-Khaiwani turned his support to the Houthi movement and represented them at the National Dialogue Conference. The conflict between the government and the rebels has led to one of the worst political crises in modern Yemen. The president has stepped down and Yemen is unstable.

== Reactions ==
Khalid Ibrahim, co-director of Gulf Center for Human Rights, said, "I knew Abdulkarim for many years as a very brave journalist and human rights defender. He dreamed about a new prosperous Yemen in which there is no violence or discrimination but only social justice. No doubt he will be missed as a prominent activist who tried to be a bridge for peace in the country." The GCHR demanded that the Yemeni government launch an investigation on the assassination of Mr. Khaiwani so that they could publish the results and bring justice to those that deserve it.

Irina Bokova, director-general of UNESCO said, "I condemn the murder of Abdul Karim Mohammed al-Khaiwani, a dedicated journalist of outstanding integrity. His death is a loss to the people of Yemen and the quest for informed reporting and debate."

Jim Boumelha, president of International Federation of Journalists said, "This is an outrageous and cowardly act that cannot remain unpunished. Abdul Karim was a brilliant journalist and fought hard for the underdog. His struggle for independent journalists put him at the forefront of the endeavours by Yemeni journalists to ensure that they work without threat to their lives or undue political interference. My heart goes out to his family."

== Awards ==
- 2008 Amnesty International (UK), Media Awards, Special Award for Human Rights Journalism Under Threat.

== See also ==
- List of journalists killed in Yemen
- Human rights in Yemen
