= Phnom Malai =

Region of Cambodia

Coordinates: 13°25′50″N 102°36′00″E

Map showing the location of Malai district within Banteay Meanchey Province.

Phnom Malai (Khmer: ភ្នំម៉ាឡៃ) is a mountain area in Malai District, Banteay Meanchey Province of Cambodia. The district became a Khmer Rouge stronghold and battleground through the 1980s and 1990s. Today it is a remote and sparsely populated border area with scattered settlements mostly made up of former rebels.

== History ==
Refugees from refugee camps in Aranyaprathet, Thailand, were forcefully sent back across the border in 1980 to areas under Khmer Rouge control and many of them ended up in Phnom Malai. The process was organized by pro-Democratic Kampuchea cadres, but it was presented to the press as "voluntary". It was supported by the United States government, who took a dim view of the existing pro-Vietnamese Cambodian regime, as well as countries like Malaysia, Thailand and Singapore, whose representative exhorted the disoriented refugees to "go back and fight."

By 1981 Phnom Malai was not self-sufficient, the Khmer Rouge uniforms and weapons came from China, channeled through the Thai military, and the food from markets across the border in Thailand. In this period, the Khmer Rouge was able to rebuild its military, now titled the "National Army of Democratic Kampuchea" (NADK), as well as its infamous ruling party, the Communist Party of Kampuchea (CPK), the alienated and abstruse "angkar", as the Party of Democratic Kampuchea. By mid-1980s, with the cooperation of the West and China, the Khmer Rouge had grown to about 35 to 50 thousand troops and committed cadres.

Pol Pot lived in the Phnom Malai area, giving interviews in the early 1980s accusing all those who opposed him of being traitors and "puppets" of the Vietnamese until he disappeared from public view. In 1985, his "retirement" was announced, but he kept hiding somewhere close by, still pulling the Khmer Rouge strings of power.

Phnom Malai was the location where in 1981 Pol Pot made his famous declarations denying guilt for the brutalities of the organization he led:

[Pol Pot] said that he knows that many people in the country hate him and think he’s responsible for the killings. He said that he knows many people died. When he said this he nearly broke down and cried. He said he must accept responsibility because the line was too far to the left, and because he didn’t keep proper track of what was going on. He said he was like the master in a house he didn’t know what the kids were up to, and that he trusted people too much. For example, he allowed [one person] to take care of central committee business for him, [another person] to take care of intellectuals, and [a third person] to take care of political education.... These were the people to whom he felt very close, and he trusted them completely. Then in the end ... they made a mess of everything.... They would tell him things that were not true, that everything was fine, that this person or that was a traitor. In the end they were the real traitors. The major problem had been cadres formed by the Vietnamese.

The Khmer Rouge base complex at Phnom Malai was overrun by the PRK army during the 1985 dry season. Its headquarters were completely destroyed; the Vietnamese attackers suffered substantial losses during the attack. Pol Pot was able to flee across the border to Thailand, where he lived until his death in 1998.

== See also ==
- K5 Plan
