= Michel Halpérin =

Swiss lawyer and politician

- Born: 1948; Geneva, Switzerland
- Died: 11 August 2014 (aged 65–66)
- Resting place: Veyrier Jewish cemetery
- Education: International School of Geneva; University of Geneva
- Occupation: Politician
- Political party: Liberal Party of Switzerland
- Children: 3, including a son, Lionel Halpérin

Michel Halpérin (1948-2014) was a Swiss lawyer and politician.

== Early life ==
Michel Halpérin was born in 1948.

Halpérin was educated at the International School of Geneva. He graduated from the University of Geneva.

== Career ==
Halpérin became a lawyer in 1974. He joined the law firm Ming Halpérin Burger Inaudi two years later, in 1976. He was the chairman of the Geneva Bar Association between 1990 and 1992.

Halpérin joined the Liberal Party of Switzerland. served as a member of the Grand Council of Geneva from 1984 to 1989, and from 1993 to 2009. He served as the president of the Grand Council of Geneva from 2005 to 2006.

== Philanthropy ==
Halpérin served as the president of the Swiss Friends of the Ben-Gurion University of the Negev.

== Personal life, death and legacy ==
Halpérin had two daughters and a son, politician Lionel Halpérin. He died on 11 August 2014, and he was buried in the Jewish cemetery in Veyrier.

On 7 June 2016 the Ben-Gurion University of the Negev organized the Keren Moshe Leadership Training Program's 20th Anniversary in his honor.

== Michel Halpérin Bâtonnier Prize for Excellence ==
Established in 2017, the Prix Bâtonnier Michel Halpérin aims to recognize and reward excellence as embodied by a lawyer, in memory of Bâtonnier Michel Halpérin, who has brought to the highest level the virtues and qualities of courage, humanity, integrity, finesse, talent, humour and culture.

The Bâtonnier Michel Halpérin Prize for Excellence is awarded in principle each year to a lawyer or a trainee lawyer appointed by the jury. The Prize may also be awarded to a former lawyer or posthumously.

All members of the Geneva Bar Association, as well as all members of the jury, may nominate a candidate for the award. The jury of the Prize is composed of lawyers and personalities appointed by the President of the Bar, in agreement with the family of the President of the Bar Michel Halpérin.

In 2019, the jury, chaired by Marc JOORY, is composed of :

Laura JACQUEMOUD-ROSSARI, Federal Judge,

Martine BRUNSCHWIG-GRAF, former National Councillor and former President of the Geneva Council of State,

Nathalie CHAIX,

Yaël HAYAT,

Anouchka HALPERIN,

Marc BONNANT, former President of the Bar,

Pascal MAURER, former President of the Bar,

Vincent SPIRA, former President of the Bar,

Elie ELKAÏM, former President of the Waldensian Bar,

Pierre-Damien EGGLY,

Jean-Marie CRETTAZ, winner of the first Prize,

Grégoire MANGEAT, former President of the Bar and creator of the Prize.

2018 winner of the Michel Halpérin Prize for Excellence: Jean-Marie Crettaz

2019 winner of the Michel Halpérin Prize for Excellence: Alain Werner
