= 34th News & Documentary Emmy Awards =

- Date: October 1, 2013
- Location: Rose Hall, Home of Jazz at Lincoln Center; New York City

The 34th News & Documentary Emmy Awards were held on October 1, 2013, at Rose Hall, Home of Jazz at Lincoln Center, located in the Time Warner Center in New York City. They honored the best in American news and documentary programming in 2012. Awards were presented in 42 categories, including Breaking News, Investigative Reporting, Outstanding Interview, and Best Documentary. In attendance were over 900 television and news media industry executives, news and documentary producers and journalists.

Notable awards included the Lifetime Achievement Award given to David Fanning, founder and executive producer of Frontline.

== Winners ==
=== Network breakdown ===
The following chart is a breakdown of number of awards won this awards season per station.

| Channel | Number of Emmys |
|---|---|
| CBS | 12 |
| PBS | 9 |
| HBO | 6 |
| CNN | 3 |
| National Geographic Channel | 2 |
| NBC | 2 |
| ABC | 1 |
| AXS TV | 1 |
| BBC | 1 |
| Center for Investigative Reporting | 1 |
| Discovery Channel | 1 |
| History Channel | 1 |
| John F. Kennedy Presidential Library and Museum | 1 |
| The New York Times | 1 |
| Science Channel | 1 |
| WBZ-TV (Boston) | 1 |
| KING-TV (Seattle) | 1 |

=== Breakdown by program ===
| Program | Channel | Number of Emmys |
|---|---|---|
| 60 Minutes | CBS | 6 |
| CBS Evening News | CBS | 3 |
| CBS News Sunday Morning | CBS | 2 |
| CBS This Morning | CBS | 1 |
| NBC Nightly News | NBC | 1 |
| NBC News: Decision 2012 | NBC | 1 |
| Frontline | PBS | 7 |
| American Experience | PBS | 1 |
| Nature | PBS | 1 |
| Nightline | ABC | 1 |
| HBO Documentary Films | HBO | 6 |
| Space Dive | National Geographic Channel | 1 |
| Untamed Americas | National Geographic Channel | 1 |
| Rising: Rebuilding Ground Zero | Science Channel | 1 |
| CNN Newsroom | CNN | 2 |
| Anderson Cooper 360° | CNN | 1 |
| Dan Rather Reports | AXS TV | 1 |
| BBC World News | BBC | 1 |
| In Jennifer’s Room | Center for Investigative Reporting | 1 |
| Winged Planet | Discovery Channel | 1 |
| WWII From Space | History Channel | 1 |
| Clouds over Cuba | John F. Kennedy Presidential Library and Museum | 1 |
| Life, Interrupted | NYTimes.com | 1 |
| Through the Wormhole | Science Channel | 1 |
| WBZ-TV News | WBZ-TV (Boston, Massachusetts) | 1 |
| KING 5 News | KING-TV (Seattle, Washington) | 1 |

=== Awards ===
| Lifetime Achievement Award | Chairman's Award |
|---|---|
| Jorge Ramos and María Elena Salinas of Noticiero Univision; David Fanning of PBS | |
| Regularly Scheduled Newscast | News Magazine |
| Coverage of a Breaking News Story; The Fight For Idlib, CBS Evening News (CBS); Continuing Coverage of a News Story; Inside Syria's Uprising, BBC World News (BBC); Feature Story; Arctic Journey: The Unicorn of the Sea, Nightline (ABC) (tie); Glen Campbell, CBS News Sunday Morning (CBS) (tie); Starting Over, CBS News Sunday Morning (CBS) (tie); Investigative Journalism; Exposing the Business of Congress, CBS News Sunday Morning (CBS); Business And Economic Reporting; Cancer Drug Shortages, CBS Evening News (CBS) | Coverage of a Breaking News Story; The Battle for Syria, Frontline (PBS); Continuing Coverage of a News Story; Aleppo, 60 Minutes (CBS); Feature Story; Joy in the Congo, 60 Minutes (CBS); Investigative Journalism; Opium Brides, Frontline (PBS); Business And Economic Reporting; A Hard Landing, 60 Minutes (CBS); News Discussion And Analysis; Kids on Race: The Hidden Picture, Anderson Cooper 360° (CNN) |
| Long Form | Interview |
| Live Coverage of a Current News Story; Election Night in America, CNN (CNN); Continuing Coverage of a News Story; Inside Japan's Nuclear Meltdown, Frontline (PBS); Investigative Journalism; Big Sky, Big Money, Frontline/Marketplace (PBS); Informational Programming; The Interrupters, Frontline (PBS); Historical Programming; The Loving Story, HBO Documentary Films (HBO); Business And Economic Reporting; Money, Power and Wall Street, Frontline (PBS) | Killing Bin Laden, 60 Minutes (CBS) |
| Programming | Best Story In A Regularly Scheduled Newscast |
| Arts & Culture; Marina Abramović: The Artist is Present, HBO Documentary Films (HBO); Science And Technology; Space Dive, (National Geographic Channel); Nature; An Original DUCKumentary, Nature (PBS) | On The Road: The Longest Wait, CBS Evening News (CBS) (tie); Inside Syria, NBC Nightly News (NBC) (tie) |
| Best Report In A News Magazine | Best Documentary |
| Killing Bin Laden, 60 Minutes (CBS) | Saving Face, HBO Documentary Films (HBO) |
| New Approaches To News & Documentary Programming | Individual Achievement In A Craft |
| Current News Coverage; In Jennifer's Room (Center for Investigative Reporting); Documentaries; Clouds Over Cuba, (John F. Kennedy Presidential Library and Museum); Arts, Lifestyle & Culture; Life, Interrupted (The New York Times) | Writing; Nick Paton Walsh: Reports from Syria and Afghanistan, Nick Paton Walsh (CNN); Research; Vito, HBO Documentary Films (HBO) (tie); Jesse Owens, American Experience (PBS) (tie); Cinematography - Documentary & Long Form; Winged Planet (Discovery Channel); Untamed Americas (National Geographic Channel); Editing; Joy in the Congo, 60 Minutes (CBS); Editing–Documentary & Long Form; Saving Face, HBO Documentary Films (HBO); Graphic Design & Art Direction; WWII From Space (History Channel); Music & Sound; In Tahrir Square: 18 Days of Egypt's Unfinished Revolution, HBO Documentary Films (HBO); Lighting Direction & Scenic Design; Election Night from Democracy Plaza, NBC News: Decision 2012 (NBC); Video Journalism – News; In the Running, Dan Rather Reports (AXS TV) |
| Promotional Announcement | Regional News Story |
| Institutional; Frontline Fall Preview: How Come?, Frontline (PBS); Episodic; Through the Wormhole (Science Channel) | Spot News; Newtown Tragedy, WBZ-TV News (WBZ-TV (Boston, Massachusetts)); Investigative Reporting; Their Crime, Your Dime, KING 5 News (KING-TV (Seattle, Washington)) |

== Presenters ==
- Ted Koppel, Special Correspondent NBC News, News Analyst NPR, and Contribution Columnist to The New York Times, The Washington Post and The Wall Street Journal
- Sharyl Attkisson, Investigative Correspondent CBS News
- Candy Crowley, Chief Political Correspondent CNN, host of State of the Union
- David Muir, Correspondent ABC News, Weekend Anchor of ABC World News, co-Anchor of 20/20
- Katty Kay, Anchor of the BBC World News America
- Alex Wagner, Host of MSNBC's Now with Alex Wagner
- Marvin Scott, Senior Correspondent WPIX-TV, anchor/host of PIX News Close Up
- N.J. Burkett, award-winning correspondent WABC-TV, President of the National Academy of Television Arts and Sciences
- Bruce Paisner, President & CEO, The International Academy of Television Arts & Sciences
