= Alieu Kosiah =

Former commander of the United Liberation movement of Liberia for democracy

Alieu Kosiah (born 3 March 1975 in Ganta, Nimba County, Liberia) is a former commander of the United Liberation Movement of Liberia for Democracy (ULIMO) faction, a rebel group that participated in the First Liberian Civil War (1989–1996) which fought against the National Patriotic Front of Liberia, led by Charles Taylor. After the war, Kosiah moved to Switzerland, where he obtained permanent residence.

== Arrest ==
On 10 November 2014, Swiss authorities arrested Kosiah in connection with accusations that he was involved in mass killings in parts of Liberia's Lofa County from 1993 to 1995. Criminal complaints were filed against him by several Liberian victims, four of them were represented by Alain Werner, Director of the Swiss NGO Civitas Maxima. Kosiah was accused of ordering civilian massacres, rapes, and other atrocities in northern Liberia during the nation's First Civil War.

== Indictment ==
On 22 March 2019, after five years of criminal investigation, the Swiss Office of the Attorney General (OAG) indicted Kosiah for war crimes, after hearing testimony from over 25 witnesses and victims.

== Charges ==
Kosiah was charged on several counts, including having ordered, committed, or participated in the murder of civilians and soldiers hors de combat, having desecrated the corpse of a civilian, having raped a civilian, having ordered the cruel treatment of civilians, having recruited and used a child soldier, having ordered several pillages, and having ordered and/or participated in the forced transport of goods and ammunition by civilian.

On 31 October 2019, the Swiss Federal Criminal Court listed the criminal case against Alieu Kosiah for trial in Bellinzona, commencing on 14 April and concluding on 30 April 2020. In March 2020, due to the rapid spread of COVID-19, and the increasing measures being imposed by the Swiss authorities in response to the pandemic, the FCC announced that the trial of Alieu Kosiah, former ULIMO commander, was postponed again. The Court has decided to only proceed with the preliminary questions and the hearing of the defendant from 3 December to 11 December 2020. Lawyer Alain Werner, representing four of the alleged victims, called for the trial to be postponed so that they could be present, or, at least, for the hearings to be live streamed to Liberia. The rest of the trial – the hearing of the plaintiffs and the witnesses, and the final pleadings took place from 15 February to 5 March 2021.

On June 1, 2023, Alieu Kosiah was found guilty of crimes against humanity and served 20 years in prison at first instance by a court in Switzerland..

== Trial ==
As the trial opened on 3 December 2020, Federal Criminal Court president Jean-Luc Bacher put some preliminary questions, then moved to questioning Kosiah before later giving the floor to the public prosecutor and defence. Kosiah denied all the charges against him, saying he was not in the places where the crimes were committed and that he did not know the victims.

During the first week of the second phase of the war crimes trial, civilian victims have taken the stand to recount the crimes committed by ULIMO rebel forces during the first Liberian civil war, between 1989 and 1996.

On 2 March, the victims’ lawyers began their joint plea and, with the help of a detailed chronology, Raphaël Jakob tried to show that the various explanations given by the accused do not hold water. "In addition to the convincing testimonies of our clients, historical sources confirm the explanations of the plaintiffs and show that the group to which Mr. Kosiah belonged was on the spot at the time of the worst abuses and systematic looting of the region," he argued. This argument was followed by that of fellow victims’ lawyer Hikmat Maleh: "During the whole of these proceedings, we systematically had to deal with a defendant who denounced a conspiracy theory. He says, for example, that if the plaintiffs recognize the photos presented by the Public Prosecutor’s Office, it is because they are lying. And if they do not recognize them, they are lying too."

The Defence Lawyer, Dimitri Gianoli, pleaded that Alieu Kosiah could not have committed the crimes that the prosecution claims because he was not present at the time of these acts. The defence counsel concentrated on trying to show various contradictions in the testimony of the civil parties – for example, the fact that "one of the plaintiffs says that Kosiah was wearing a military jacket, but this outfit is in no way adapted to the climate. No one ever wore that jacket but rather shirts, because of the heat. So this is proof that the witness is lying".

The Swiss Federal Prosecutor's Office (MPC) requested for Kosiah the maximum sentence of deprivation of liberty - 20 years - and deportation from Switzerland for 15 years, given the " extreme severity " of the crimes he is accused of committing.

This was the first time an ULIMO member was tried for war crimes, and the first time the FCC held a war crimes trial. This trial in Switzerland was the first under a 2011 law that allows prosecution for war crimes committed anywhere in the world. It also marked the first time war crimes charges have been heard by a Swiss civilian court.

== Verdict ==
He was convicted in Switzerland on 18 June 2021. He was the first Liberian to be convicted in connection with Liberia's civil war. He was sentenced to 20 years for the crimes including murder, rape and cannibalism. On 11 January 2023, a trial to appeal the 22 convictions for war crimes began in Switzerland.

In June 2023, the Swiss Appeals Chamber upheld his war crimes conviction and the 20 year sentence. Kosiah's post sentence ban was reduced from 15 to 10 years.
