= The Analyst (newspaper) =

Independent newspaper in Monrovia, Liberia

The Analyst is an independent newspaper published in Liberia, based in Monrovia. Run by two journalists, its aim is to "provide thoughtful, balanced news and encourage civil society in governance and the press". It is considered one of the top sources for political issues in Liberia.

== See also ==
- List of newspapers in Liberia
