= Dan McDougall =

British journalist

- Born: Paisley, Scotland
- Occupation: Journalist

Dan McDougall is an international journalist. He is the current Africa Correspondent for The Sunday Times of London. He has reported from over 126 countries and war zones including Afghanistan, Somalia, Pakistani Kashmir, Northern Yemen, The Sudan, The Eastern Democratic Republic of Congo, Burma, Rwanda, Bosnia, China, Hezbollah-controlled Lebanon and the Palestinian Territories.

A former New Delhi–based South Asia Correspondent for The Observer Newspaper (London, he has won three Amnesty International UK Media Awards for outstanding human rights journalism, and was voted the British Foreign Journalist of the Year at the 2009 British Press Awards. Dan is a media leader at The World Economic Forum and is a visiting lecturer in Human Rights at The University of Cambridge.

== Awards and commendations ==
McDougall's foreign reportage has appeared in magazines, periodicals and newspapers worldwide including The Guardian, The Sunday Times, The Times, The Sunday Telegraph, the Independent on Sunday, Stern Magazine, Periodica El Mundo, El Semenal, Le Figaro, Panorama Italia, L'Espresso, The Sydney Morning Herald, The Ecologist, Marie Claire and Mail on Sunday Live Magazine.

Year	Award	Category	Result	Description
2011	Amnesty International UK Media Awards	Magazines – Newspaper Supplements	Winner	for a Reportage investigation on child rape in South Africa published in The Sunday Times Magazine (his third Amnesty International Prize).
2010	One World Awards	Journalist of the Year	Winner	For a series of three reportage features
2010	Amnesty International UK Media Awards	Outstanding Human Rights Journalism	Winner	For undercover reportage magazine feature on Zimbabwe's blood diamond trade.
2010	Foreign Press Association of London Awards	British Foreign Correspondent of the Year	Winner	
2010	Martha Gellhorn Prize	Martha Gellhorn Prize for War Reporting	Runner-up	For exposing the internment of children in northern Sri Lanka during the civil war, and for work exposing the international trade in blood diamonds.
2009	Press Gazette Environmental Awards	British Environmental story of the year	Winner	For investigation into an industrial environmental disaster in Lesotho perpetrated by a supplier to major international retailers
2009	British Press Awards	British Foreign Correspondent of the Year	Winner	For a series of articles including an investigation of the plight of children left destitute by the execution of their parents in Xi'an, Central China. The Judges also commended an undercover investigation of the lives of the women drug mules who risk their lives smuggling heroin from the Afghan Border to Moscow in their stomachs.
2009	British Press Awards	British Journalist of the Year	Runner-up	
2009	Press Gazette Environmental Awards	British Environmental Journalist of the Year	Runner-up	
2008	Press Gazette Magazine Awards	Foreign Correspondent of the Year	Runner-up	
2008	Press Gazette Magazine Awards	Magazine Feature Writer of the Year	Runner-up	
2007/8	The Paul Foot Award	Campaigning Investigative Journalism	Shortlisted	For work exposing child refugee workers in the supply chain of Primark and the exploitation of child workersin the Egyptian cotton fields
2007/8	The One World Awards		Commendation	For an undercover Investigation into the international trafficking of African child footballers from Côte d'Ivoire and Ghana to Paris.
2007/8	Press Gazette Magazine Awards	British Magazine Feature Writer of the Year	Commendation	For a series of articles including a feature on the suffering of Italy's marginalised Roma population.

== Campaign against child labour in Africa and South Asia ==
In August 2009 during a two-month-long investigation for The Sunday Times of London into the manufacture of clothing for Gap Inc and Levi's, two of the world's leading retailers, McDougall uncovered a denim supplier to both firms inflicting an environmental catastrophe in Lesotho, one of Africa's poorest countries.

Through documentary photographic and video evidence gathered by The Scot in Maseru, the capital of Lesotho, McDougall uncovered the release of effluents and dyes from a textile mill and factory operated by the Taiwanese Firm, Nien Hsing Textiles, the world's largest denim manufacturer, who supply tens of millions of pairs of jeans to both Gap and Levi's British and American customers, stained industrial residue that was spilling into water lifelines used by destitute families on a daily basis.

McDougall also uncovered the widespread public dumping of tonnes of garment industry waste by Nien Hsing Textiles and Precious Garments, the latter a major Gap knitwear supplier, which created a culture of dependency amongst child ragpickers attracted to the growing garment wastelands by the denim and plastics discarded by both suppliers.

In response to the allegations, which were followed up across the world, both Gap Inc and Levi's appeared on CBS America and Sky News to explain the crisis. Gap Inc's Senior Director of Global Responsibility, Dan Henkle, later confirmed that they had issued a formal warning against one of their suppliers. Levi Strauss also confirmed McDougall's allegations admitting that both water pollution and unsecured landfill sites were creating severe environmental issues in Maseru.

In January 2009 McDougall working for The Scot investigated TNS Knitwear Ltd, based in a former Victorian mill in Manchester, one of the UK High Street firm Primark's biggest UK suppliers of knitwear. The investigation revealed TNS to be employing illegal immigrants on less than the minimum wage at a site barely a few miles from Primark's main Manchester Store.

In 2008 his investigation into Primark, a UK fashion retailer, were broadcast as part of a Panorama programme for the BBC. However, in the years following the programme, Primark's legal team argued that a forty-second section of footage used in the documentary was not authentic later leading to an apology by the BBC Trust. McDougall himself and a number of international NGO's, including War on Want and World Vision, reacted to the decision with outrage, because Primark had been unable to undermine the main body of evidence which remains beyond dispute. In the wake of the investigation Primark was voted as Britain's least ethical clothing retailer.

In 2007 McDougall's undercover investigations in India exposed a supplier to Gap Inc for employing bonded child slaves as young as 10 and 11. Gap later withdrew tens of thousands of garments from sale. Their CEO Marka Hansen issued a public apology on CNN.

During his investigations into child labour in India, Pakistan, Bangladesh and Sri Lanka, which have also shamed the major retailers Esprit and Heine Otto, McDougall has been regularly threatened and, an occasion, beaten attempting to force his way into sweatshops. In 2007 the US-based Ethisphere Magazine voted the Scotsman as one of the world's most influential journalist in the field of ethical trading.

=== Panorama Dispute ===
On 16 June 2011 the BBC announced that it would apologise to Primark after a protracted inquiry by the BBC Trust ruled that McDougall had "more likely than not" staged a small section of footage of young Indian boys stitching items of clothing, a claim that both he and the programme vehemently denied as without foundation.

In a report, the Trust said it had investigated the programme and found that "On the balance of probabilities, it was more likely than not that the footage was not authentic." leading McDougall and the NGO War on Want to react with outrage to the Trust decision. Roy Greenslade, one of Britain's most respected media commentators, described the decision by the BBC Trust to uphold at least part of the complaint against Panorama over its programme on Primark as "baffling."

Greenslade further claimed that it went "against natural justice to find against the journalist and producers on what it calls "the balance of probabilities." Describing McDougall as an intrepid, award-winning investigative reporter with a superb record in exposing human rights violations and the programmes Editor, Frank Simmonds, as "an experienced producer who has been responsible for many important revelatory Panorama programmes." Greenslade said he believed that the Trust had "got this wholly wrong." He also wrote that "in a further investigation into Primark – published six months after the Panorama documentary – McDougall exposed the company again for employing illegal immigrants in a UK sweatshop, a story published in the News of the World and the Observer." That investigation was also published on the BBC Ten O'Clock News. As a result of McDougall's exposé the Ethical Trade Initiative, the trade body that monitors Britain's retailers, ordered Primark to remove ETI Ethical branding from their 140 storefronts the removed ethical branding from thousands of tills and its corporate website.

In the wake of the Trust decision to uphold the complaint against a 45-second section of the film, McDougall said he was "appalled by the decision." He added: "I have rarely seen a finding so unjust in outcome, flawed in process, and deeply damaging to independent investigative journalism."

Following the announcement, Primark created a video explaining how it investigated the small section of the Panorama programme and submitted its case to the BBC Trust. The Trust also instructed BBC Panorama to hand back the Royal Television Society Award that the programme had collected for the exposé.

But the International aid agency World Vision strongly criticised Primark for attacking the BBC programme which highlighted the potential exploitation of children making Primark clothing. According to Concern the documentary successfully highlighted the serious issue of outsourcing by Primark, which breaks the company's own code of conduct. Outsourcing clothing production to workers outside the factory gates can lead to child exploitation.

David Thomson, World Vision UK's director of policy, said: "Outsourcing is a problem. The key concern here is that Panorama proved that Primark was breaking its own policies. In this regard, Primark has played its part in a global scandal in which more than 150 million children are exploited for profit. This is the issue on which we should all be focusing. Primark is in danger of throwing the baby out with the bathwater."

Mr Thomson added: “With millions of children being forced to work for a pittance, often in perilous conditions, including mines and quarries, as well as for the rag trade, the morally correct position for Primark would be to seek to address its own processes which have been highlighted by the BBC.”

The International NGO War on Want also reacted to the BBC Trust decision with dismay. In a statement it reaffirmed that the programmes broader finding was not in dispute: “That Primark suppliers were exploiting workers who were made to work long hours for minimal pay. Indeed, we released our own extensive research to this effect in two reports, in 2006 and 2008 – the second published not long after the Panorama film.”

The NGO added: “War on Want is disappointed at the aggressive pursuit of the BBC by Primark’s lawyers, and believes the company’s resources would be better spent improving workers’ rights in its supply chain. Furthermore, the dispute over the information of what actually happened in Bangalore – which the BBC Trust could not conclusively resolve either way – only strengthens War on Want’s urgent call for the UK government to establish an independent regulator with investigative and punitive powers.”

In a letter written to the BBC Trust on the case by the BBC’s Director General, Mark Thompson, the Director General said that investigative journalists should themselves be protected from allegations made against them. Thompson stated:

“There are inherent difficulties in requiring journalists, who operate alone, to demonstrate, unequivocally, that filmed footage is genuine and that safeguards must be put in place to protect journalists from claims of fraud which may themselves be false but which are impossible authoritatively to disprove.”

== Personal life ==
McDougall is married to the former BBC South Asia Correspondent Navdip Dhariwal with whom he has two children.

== Work ==
- 'Recent Work', The Sunday Times
