= Tom Woewiyu =

Liberian politician (1946–2020)

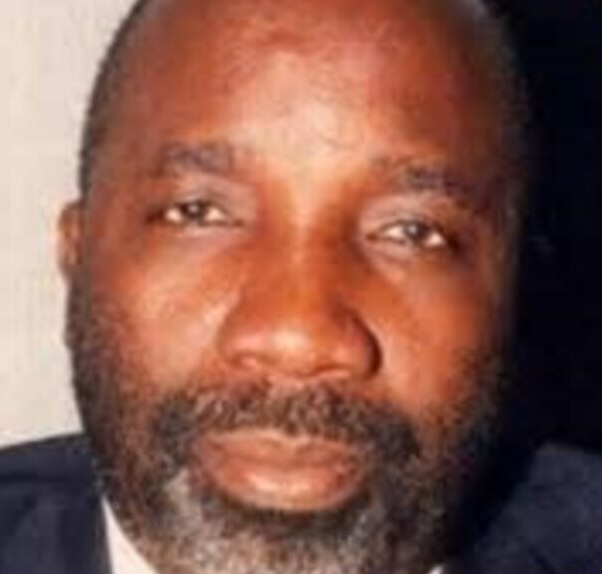
Woewiyu circa 2014

Jucontee Thomas Woewiyu (1946 – April 12, 2020), also known as Tom Woewiyu or Thomas Smith, was the former leader of the National Patriotic Front of Liberia (NPFL), with Charles Taylor.

Woewiyu served as Defense Minister from 1989 to 1996 and Spokesman for the NPFL a rebel faction deemed responsible for over 60,000 violations, consisting of war crimes such as rape, slavery, conscription of child soldiers, and massacres, during Liberia's First Civil War (1989 - 1996). Woewiyu has held legal permanent resident status in the United States since 1972. There, he founded the Association for Constitutional Democracy in Liberia (ACDL) among the Liberian expatriate community in the U.S., an organization that advocated against the regime of the Samuel Doe, then President of Liberia. Woewiyu is also known for, at times, speaking out publicly against two former Liberian presidents Ellen Johnson Sirleaf and Charles Taylor.

Upon Woewiyu's return from a visit to Liberia, he was arrested at Newark Liberty International Airport accused of lying on immigration applications by omitting his role and authority within the NPFL.

Notably, the Liberian Truth and Reconciliation Commission recommended that Thomas Woewiyu not take public office for thirty years based on his association in warring factions during the First Liberian Civil War.

== National Patriotic Front of Liberia (NPFL) ==
The NPFL created and led by Charles Taylor and Thomas Woewiyu catalyzed the start of the First Liberian Civil War in 1989. The NPFL is reported to have campaigned for ethnically-targeted killings, the conscription of child soldiers, the forcing of individuals into sexual slavery, and the alleged organization and participation in "Operation Octopus." The infamous Operation Octopus, one of the deadliest armed attacks in the history of West Africa, led to the violent attempted seizure of Monrovia which resulted in the murder of thousands of combatants and civilians, including the executions of five American nuns. By April 1990, the NPFL controlled almost 90% of the country. While the NPFL was committing these crimes, Thomas Woewiyu served as the faction's Spokesman and Defense Minister.

At the height of the conflict in the early 1990s and due to the nature of his role as spokesman for NPFL, Woewiyu had conversations with U.S. State Department officials and the British Broadcasting Corporation (BBC) about the NPFL's frustrations about the political state in Liberia.

== National Patriotic Front of Liberia-Central Revolutionary Council (NPFL-CRC) ==
In 1994, as a result of ideological dissent, Woewiyu broke away from Taylor's forces and created his own movement: the NPFL-CRC (National Patriotic Front of Liberia, Central Revolutionary Council). He, Samuel Dokie, and J. Lavela Supuwood led the movement. Woewiyu later made multiple accusations of war crimes against Taylor, claiming that Taylor not only murdered his rival Jackson Doe, but drank Doe's blood.

NPFL-CRC had limited resources but still engaged in small battles with similar tactics as the NPFL, ULIMO-J, ULIMO-K, and the LPC, however they were not a major force in the conflict.

Later, Woewiyu reunited with Charles Taylor after his election as President in 1997, serving as his Minister of Labor from 1997 to 1999.

== Association for Constitutional Democracy in Liberia (ACDL) ==
The ACDL was established by Woewiyu and members of the Liberian expatriate community, many of whom were in exile. This movement was resolutely against Samuel Doe, then Liberian President who gained office through a coup d'état in 1980.

The ACDL is known for their letter published in Front Page Africa which details the movements of the NFPL, their grievances against Samuel Doe, and calls for donations from "citizens as well as friends of Liberia."

Another notable member of the ACDL was Ellen Johnson Sirleaf, who later went on to become President of Liberia and was jointly awarded a Nobel Peace Prize. Woewiyu publicly claimed that the ACDL had raised substantial funds, given by Ellen Johnson Sirleaf, to financially contribute to the war through the NPFL.

== Arrest ==
On Woewiyu's return from Liberia back to the United States in May 2014, he was arrested due to a criminal investigation that began in January of that year, by U.S. Immigration and Customs Enforcement at the Newark Liberty International Airport on charges of lying on his immigration application for U.S. citizenship omitting his involvement in the NPFL and in other war crimes. This arrest coincides with the launch of his bid for senator in Liberia.

While filing naturalization papers in 2006, 34 years after obtaining legal permanent resident status, Woewiyu failed to disclose his membership in the NPFL, and later NPFL-CRC, both of which were rebel factions during the First Liberian Civil War. He omitted his participation in advocating for a government overthrow, he denied persecuting people discriminately, and he failed to disclose a previous criminal conviction.

He pleaded not guilty and was denied bail. The FBI had originally indicated that it planned to charge Woewiyu in relation to the 1992 killing of 5 American nuns Liberia.

=== Charges ===
In his indictment file, Thomas Woewiyu was charged with 16 counts relating to immigration fraud and perjury:

- 2 counts of fraudulently attempting to obtain citizenship under 18 U.S.C. § 1425
- 4 counts of fraud in immigration documents under 18 U.S.C. § 1546(a)
- 3 counts of false statements in relation to naturalization under 18 U.S.C. § 1015(a)
- 7 counts of perjury under 18 U.S.C. § 1621

Specifically, Woewiyu allegedly lied when asked:

- If he has ever been a member of or associated with any organization, association, fund, foundation, party, club, society, or similar group in the U.S. or any other place.
  - Answering yes, however mentioning only one association in the U.S., Union of Liberia Associations, and not disclosing his membership to the NPFL or NPFL-CRC.
- If he ever advocated (directly or indirectly) to overthrow any government by force or violence.
  - Answering no and not disclosing his advocacy to overthrow the government of former Liberian President Samuel Doe.
- If he ever persecuted (directly or indirectly) any person because of race, religion, national origin, membership in a particular social group, or political opinion.
  - Answering no and not disclosing NPFL membership and persecution of others based on political opinions and race (Krahn and Mandingo tribes).
- If he ever was convicted of a crime or offense.
  - Answering no and not disclosing a 1970 conviction in New York State for falsification of business records

== Trial ==
Woewiyu was not charged with war crimes, but with immigration fraud based on connections to war crimes in Liberia.

Because he was arrested in 2014 and didn't face trial until 2018, Woewiyu felt his right to a speedy and fair trial was violated. As such, on December 20, 2017, Woewiyu filed a motion to dismiss the indictment for a violation of the Speedy Trial Act, which was later denied on January 31, 2018.

On June 11, 2018, Woewiyu's trial began at the United States District Court for the Eastern District of Pennsylvania at the James A. Byrne United States Courthouse. The prosecutors were United States Attorney William M. McSwain, Assistant United States Attorney Linwood C. Wright, Jr., and Assistant United States Attorney Nelson S. T. Thayer, Jr.. The defense attorneys included Catherine Henry, a Senior Litigator with the Federal Community Defense Office and Mark T. Wilson, of the Defender Association of Philadelphia.

The trial lasted for 13 days and included the testimonies of 66 witnesses of which over 30 were Liberians.

=== Defense Strategy ===
The defense claimed Woewiyu answered the complex and unclear questions on the immigration application to the best of his ability. Largely through cross-examination of U.S. officials, the defense argued that the government already knew about Woewiyu's ties to the NPFL, because he served as Spokesman and due to the prior investigations on him. His defense attorneys assured that Woewiyu had nothing to do with the persecution of Liberians based on ethnicity, and that Doe's regime was not a legitimate government and he therefore did not lie when he denied ever having participated in the overthrow of a government. The defense called on Woewiyu's immigration lawyer to testify to the immigration application meeting and claimed a rushed experience. To testify to Mr. Woewiyu's honest and trustworthy character, the defense called Mr. Woeiwyu's children. The defense repeatedly challenged what all of these wartime violations had to do with Woewiyu's case, it was about immigration.

=== Prosecution Strategy ===
The prosecution's strategy during the trial was to demonstrate that Woewiyu lied because of the atrocities by the NPFL, and thus he deliberately omitted his authority in the NPFL knowing he would have been otherwise denied citizenship. Thayer told the jury that the evidence will show that while Woewiyu was under oath, he lied on official U.S. government forms, in particular his Citizenship Application Form N-400, and that he repeated those lies, again while under oath, in a subsequent interview with an Immigration Officer.

=== Verdict ===
Jucontee Thomas Woewiyu was found guilty on 11 of the 16 counts:

- 2 counts of fraudulently attempting to obtain citizenship
- 2 counts of fraud in immigration documents
- 2 counts of false statements in relation to naturalization
- 5 counts of perjury

Indictment Filed: January 30, 2014

Verdict Issued: July 3, 2018

=== Sentencing and death ===
Woewiyu's sentencing was first scheduled for October 15, 2018: he faced up to 75 years in prison and a fine. He was not in custody awaiting sentencing, that was postponed several times during 2018 and 2019. After the last postponement in April 2019, a new date for the hearing was not set, but was expected in 2020. On April 12, he died of COVID-19 after a week of treatment at the Bryn Mawr Hospital near Philadelphia, U.S.

=== International Significance ===
For many, this trial represents more than a conviction, it is an additional step in pursuit of justice and accountability for Liberia's victims of war crimes. Both the international community and the Liberian government have failed to provide mechanisms for justice to the numerous victims of the Liberian Civil Wars. This marks the second trial in the U.S. where Liberian victims testified to hold an alleged war criminal accountable for his actions during the First Liberian Civil War (1989-1996). Woewiyu's trial is the very first time that witnesses were able to testify in criminal court about crimes committed by the NPFL.

== Debate ==
The Liberian Truth and Reconciliation Commission, established by the Liberian Transitional Government in 2005, published its final recommendations in 2009, suggesting that Liberia establish a Special Criminal Court to prosecute war-related crimes. However, Liberia lacks the political will to implement the recommendations and many alleged war criminals hold positions of power making prosecution for war crimes impossible in the national criminal justice system.

Though questions have circled around Woewiyu's trial questioning why his case wasn't taken to the International Criminal Court (ICC) under international humanitarian law, Woewiyu was unable to be tried in the ICC. The ICC in the Hague has only had jurisdiction since July, 2002, and therefore does not have jurisdiction over crimes committed during Liberia's First Civil War, spanning from 1989-1996. Woewiyu's war crimes were committed before both the existence of the ICC and before Liberia ratified the Rome Statute, the founding document of the ICC. Liberia ratified the Rome Statute of the ICC in 2004. In addition, since the charges are related to U.S. immigration and Woewiyu had legal residency in the U.S., the United States holds jurisdiction. This does, however, provide the opportunity to document alleged war crimes committed in Liberia by someone residing in the U.S. in a legitimate criminal court of law.

However, there has been a growing movement in Liberian society pushing for increased accountability for those who committed grave crimes during the Liberian Civil Wars. Additionally, both Liberians and international actors, notably in the UN Human Rights Committee in 2018, have increased pressure on the Liberian government to implement a war crimes court as recommended by the Liberian Truth and Reconciliation Commission Final Report. This is also in response to some resistance in the trials of Liberian warlords happening outside of Liberia.

== Related Cases ==
Mohammed “Jungle Jabbah” Jabateh, was found guilty after three weeks of trial in Philadelphia, Pennsylvania, of immigration fraud and perjury. The charges were connected to failing to disclose his role with the United Liberation Movement of Liberia for Democracy (ULIMO) as commander of the rebel faction. In April 2018, "Jungle Jabbah" was sentenced to 30 years in prison.

George Boley, Liberian immigrant to the United States was subject to administrative removal proceedings for his connection to the recruitment of child soldiers and extrajudicial killings. He was deported to Liberia in 2012. Boley was elected in 2017 as part of the Legislator of the Republic of Liberia.

There has also been a case where an American citizen was held accountable for atrocities committed during Liberia's Second Civil War. Chuckie Taylor, American son of Charles Taylor, was sentenced in 2009 in the U.S. for torture he committed during the Second Liberian Civil War. He was tried for torture, and not immigration-related crimes, as a U.S. citizen and was the first-ever to be tried under 18 U.S.C.§ 2340, or the "Torture Act," which states an act of torture committed outside the U.S. by a U.S. national is punishable by law.
