= National Patriotic Front of Liberia – Central Revolutionary Council =

Liberian rebel group

- Leaders: Sam Dokie; Tom Woewiyu
- Dates active: 1994-1996
- Active regions: Liberia
- Size: ?
- Wars: the Liberian Civil War

The National Patriotic Front of Liberia-Central Revolutionary Council (NPFL-CRC) was a rebel group that participated in the First Liberian Civil War. The group emerged in mid-1994 and was a breakaway faction of the National Patriotic Front of Liberia (NPFL), which was led by Charles Taylor in full Charles Ghankay Taylor (born January 27, 1948, Liberia).

Prominent figures in the NPFL-CRC were Sam Dokie and Tom Woewiyu, a defense chief in Taylor's alternative government based in the Bong County town of Gbarnga. Both men cited strategic and ideological differences as the cause of their defection.

The NPFL-CRC did engage in small battles with the NPFL around Gbarnga and northern Liberia, but was not a major force in the conflict.
