= Alain Werner =

Swiss human rights lawyer

- Born: Alain Werner; 19 November 1972 (age 53); Switzerland
- Education: Geneva University, Columbia University
- Occupation: human rights lawyer
- Title: Founder of Civitas Maxima

Alain Werner (born 19 November 1972) is a Swiss human rights lawyer, specialized in the defence of victims of armed conflicts, founder and director of Civitas Maxima (CM), an international network of lawyers and investigators based in Geneva that since 2012 represents victims of mass crimes in their attempts to obtain justice.

== Education and affiliation ==
He received his degree in law from Geneva University in 1996, and was admitted to the Bar of Geneva (Switzerland) in 1999. He received his masters (LL.M) at Columbia University in 2003.

== Career ==
Werner worked in Freetown and in the Hague for five years (2003–2008) for the Office of the Prosecutor (OTP) of the Special Court for Sierra Leone (SCSL), prosecuting rebels of the Revolutionary United Front (RUF) and former Liberian President Charles Taylor. He was also a lawyer for the civil parties (victims) at the Extraordinary Chambers in the Courts of Cambodia (ECCC) in Phnom Penh on the "Kaing Guek Eav" a.k.a. "Duch" case from 2009 to 2010. Since 1998, he has also worked for Chadian victims of the former Chadian President Hissène Habré, and was the one of civil parties lawyers representing them in Habré's trial in Dakar from 2015 to 2017 at the Extraordinary African Chambers. In 2012, he founded Civitas Maxima in Geneva, Switzerland.

Werner began studying law in Geneva under Professor Robert Roth (later Presiding Judge of the Special Tribunal for Lebanon) from 1993 to 1996 just as the discipline of international criminal law was emerging. He went on to complete his master's degree at Columbia University, after which he was accepted on a Swiss government program to work on international projects. The program took him to the Special Court for Sierra Leone (SCSL) in Freetown, Sierra Leone, where he became a Trial Attorney for the OTP of the SCSL in the team prosecuting three RUF commanders following the end of the conflict in 2002. He continued in the program for three years, being then hired directly by the SCSL-OTP as Trial Attorney.

=== Charles Taylor ===
In 2006, former Liberian president Charles Taylor was arrested while in exile in Nigeria and handed over to the SCSL, which had previously indicted him. Werner joined the SCSL prosecution team led by Brenda Hollis and Nicholas Koumjian, gathering witness statements and other evidence, and appearing in Court. Taylor was eventually convicted and, following an unsuccessful appeal, was imprisoned in the UK for a term of 50 years.

=== Hissène Habré ===
Between 2008 and 2017, alongside other projects, Werner worked for Reed Brody of Human Rights Watch on the case of the former President of Chad, Hissène Habré, and represented some of the victims for the two-year trial before the Extraordinary African Chambers in Dakar from 2015 to 2017.

=== "Kaing Guek Eav" a.k.a. "Duch" ===
In 2009, he was invited by Karim Khan QC to join a team working for the victims on the "Kaing Guek Eav" or "Duch" case, the first case heard at the Extraordinary Chambers in the Courts of Cambodia (ECCC). This experience cemented Werner's focus on the importance of documentation and preservation of evidence.

=== Aegis Trust ===
From there he moved to London to the Aegis Trust, an organization dedicated to preventing genocide and mass atrocities worldwide. At Aegis he worked with Hassan Bility, a prominent Liberian journalist who had been arrested and tortured under the Taylor regime. Their focus was on crimes that had been committed in Liberia and on working with partners in Sierra Leone to obtain evidence on the trade by Western players of 'blood diamonds'

=== International Criminal Court ===
In July 2024, Werner was registered on the list of Counsels admitted to appear in front of the International Criminal Court.

== Civitas Maxima ==
At that point, Werner decided to set out on his own network and, in September 2012, he founded Civitas Maxima, an organisation that focuses on the meticulous documentation of mass crimes, and pursuit of justice on behalf of the victims.

Since its establishment in 2012, Civitas Maxima, working with its partners ( Global Justice and Research Project in Liberia and Center for Accountability and the Rule of Law in Sierra Leone) has built cases and contributed to the arrest of several individuals suspected of involvement in war crimes and crimes against humanity, collaborating with several different war crimes units, agents and/or prosecutors in Europe and the United States.

== Awards ==
In April 2019 Werner was awarded the prize Bâtonnier Michel Halpérin for Excellence by the Geneva Bar Association. In November 2020, he became an Ashoka fellow. Emilie Romon, co-director of Ashoka Switzerland, stated that : "We selected Alain Werner as a fellow because of his vision, creative solutions, impressive impact and strong ethical fiber. He identifies flaws in the system and finds new entrepreneurial ways to achieve his goals. He has the potential to transform the judiciary system and increase the efficiency of international justice."
