= Christine Toomey =

British journalist

Christine Toomey is a British journalist and foreign correspondent for The Sunday Times. She has written several books, including Two Sides of the Moon (2004), which she coauthored with astronauts David Scott and Alexei Leonov, and The Saffron Road: A Journey with Buddha’s Daughters (2015). (Note: The book was titled In Search of Buddha's Daughters: A Modern Journey Down Ancient Roads when it was published in the US.) She won the Amnesty International Media Award twice for her work in The Sunday Times Magazine: first in 2002 for "The School of Assassins that the US Army has tried to hide" and then in 2006 for "Beasts of Prey". In 2003, she was a finalist for the "Feature Writer of the Year" award from the British Press Awards.
