= Mohammed Jabbateh =

Liberian war criminal

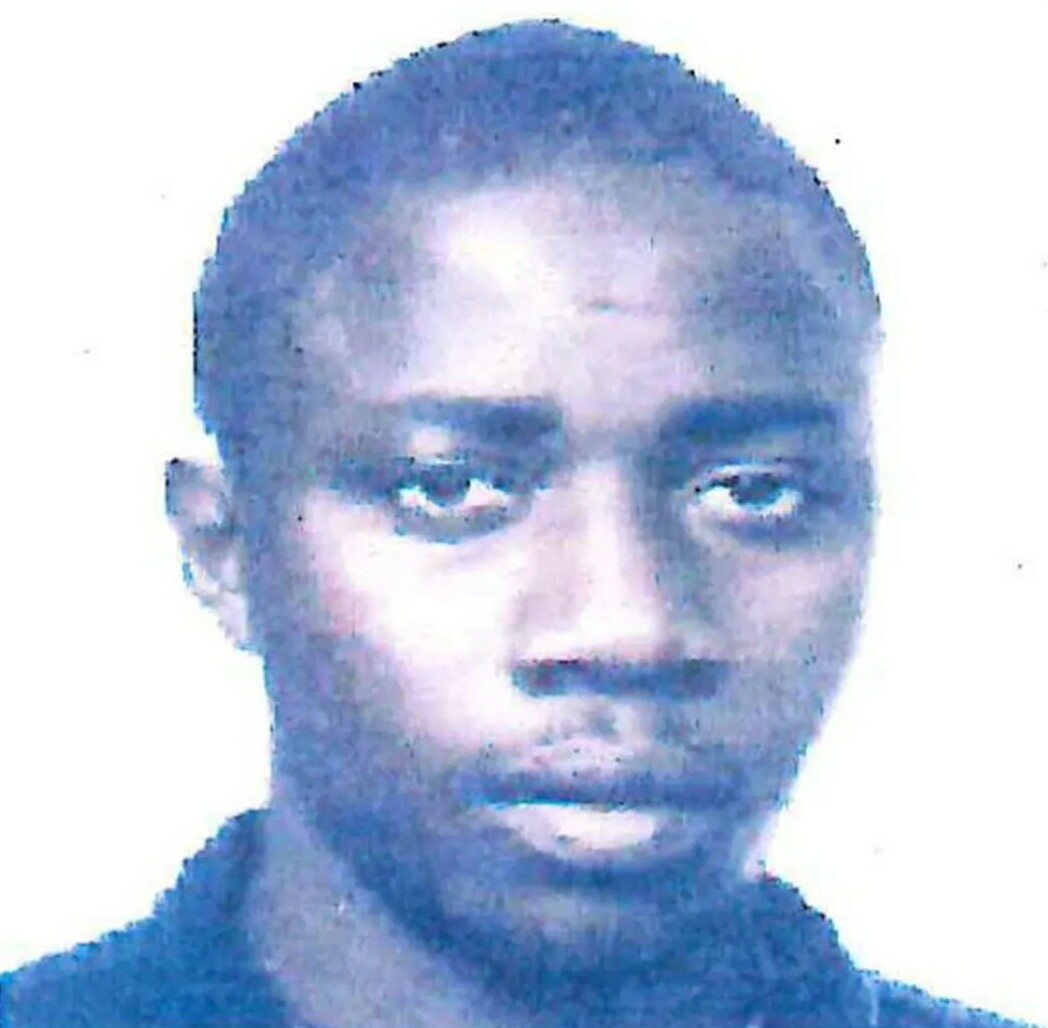
- Mohammed Jabbateh in a photo submitted with his U.S. asylum application in 1998
- Born: September 1966 (age 60); Liberia
- Status: Incarcerated
- Convictions: Immigration fraud (2 counts); Perjury (2 counts)
- Penalty: 30 years imprisonment

Details
- Victims: Hundreds
- Span of crimes: 1992–1995
- Country: Liberia
- Date apprehended: April 2016
- Imprisoned at: FCI Allenwood Medium
- Paramilitary career
- Allegiance: ULIMO (1992–1994); ULIMO-K (1994–1995)
- Service years: 1992–1995
- Nickname: Jungle Jabbah
- Unit: Zebra Battalion
- Conflicts: First Liberian Civil War

Mohammed Jabbateh (born September 1966), sometimes Jabateh, also known by his nom de guerre Jungle Jabbah, is a Liberian war criminal and former United Liberation Movement of Liberia for Democracy (ULIMO) and ULIMO-K commander who was convicted in the United States of lying to immigration authorities about his role in the First Liberian Civil War (1989-1997) when he sought asylum in the late 1990s. He was arrested in April 2016. On October 18, 2017, Jabbateh was tried and convicted in Philadelphia of two counts of fraud in immigration documents and two counts of perjury stemming from false statements he made when filing for asylum and permanent residence. He was sentenced to 30 years in prison the following April, the statutory maximum allowed. Jabbateh was the first person convicted of crimes stemming from war-related activities during the First Liberian Civil War. He lost his appeal in September 2020.

== Atrocities ==
Jabbateh joined ULIMO in 1992. He rose to the rank of a commander. Jabbateh was the leader of the Zebra Battalion. The organization was responsible for countless atrocities, including the murders of hundreds of civilians, rape, sexual slavery, torture, ritual cannibalism, and human enslavement. In 1994, ULIMO split into two warring factions, ULIMO-K and ULIMO-J. Jabbateh stuck with the former organization. Both groups continued to commit atrocities. According to witnesses, Jabbateh would cut out the hearts of some of his victims and force their widows to cook them. He would then feed the cooked heart to his men, believing it would give them strength.

== Immigration to the United States ==
In December 1998, Jabbateh submitted his application for US asylum and later for US permanent residency.

Jabbateh disclosed that he was a member of ULIMO and later ULIMO-K (Mandingo ethnic faction), but he did not reveal his alleged capacity. In January 1999, an immigration asylum officer interviewed Jabbateh to determine whether his asylum application should be granted. Jabbateh responded "no" to these two questions: 1. "Have you ever committed a crime?" and 2. Have you ever harmed anyone else?" In January 1999, Jabbateh received US asylum based on his answers to questions posed on his Form I-589 asylum application form.

Jabbateh also applied for permanent residency (also known as a green card) using Form I-485. He responded "No" to these two questions: 1. "Have you ever engaged in genocide, or otherwise ordered, incited, assisted or otherwise participated in the killing of any person because of race, religion, nationality, ethnic origin or political opinion?" 2. "Are you under a final order of civil penalty for violating section 274C of the Immigration and Nationality Act for use of fraudulent documents of have you, by fraud or willful misrepresentation of a material fact, ever sought to procure or procured a visa, other documentation, or entry into the US or any immigration benefit?".

== Indictment and arrest ==
On March 10, 2016, Jabbateh was indicted and charged by the US Attorney's Office for the Eastern District of Pennsylvania with two counts of fraud in immigration documents in violation of the 18 U.S.C. § 1546 and two counts of perjury in violation of 18 U.S.C. § 1621.

The indictment was unsealed on April 13, 2016, and Jabbateh was arrested in his Delaware County home in Lansdowne, Pennsylvania.

== Trial ==
On October 2, 2017, Jabbateh was arraigned before the Honorable Judge Paul S. Diamond at the James A. Byrne Federal Courthouse in Philadelphia, Pennsylvania. Jabbateh pleaded not guilty on all counts. The jury, composed of eight women and four men, was selected the same day and opening arguments began the following day. The trial lasted for three weeks until October 18, 2017.

Assistant United States Attorney Linwood C. Wright, Jr. and Assistant United States Attorney Nelson S.T. Thayer prosecuted Jabbateh. Thayer was previously a trial attorney at the International Criminal Tribunal for the Former Yugoslavia and prosecuted the massacre in Srebrenica, Bosnia. The government stated that as a ULIMO-K commander in the late 1990s, Jabbateh either committed himself or ordered his troops to "commit crimes such as the murder of civilians, sexual enslavement of women, public rapes, conscription of child soldiers and maiming and torture of noncombatants." Twenty witnesses and victims were flown from Liberia to Philadelphia to testify in court against Jabbateh.

Gregory J. Pagano was the attorney for Jabbateh. Pagano interrogated the credibility of the government's selection of the witnesses and their testimonies. The defense counsel presented their case on October 16, 2017.

== Verdict ==
On October 18, Jabbateh was convicted of two counts of fraud in immigration documents and two counts of perjury stemming from statements he made in connection with his applications for asylum and permanent residence. Jabbateh was sentenced to 30 years in prison on April 19, 2018. Although federal guidelines generally only call for 15 to 21 months in prison for the charges he was convicted, U.S. District Judge Paul S. Diamond instead sentenced him to the statutory maximum, saying it would be "not only unreasonable but outrageously offensive" in light of his past.

"I want to be clear, I am departing not based on the horror of the atrocities the defendant committed abroad. Rather, I am departing based on the egregiousness of his lies…and their effect on our asylum laws and immigration system."

He said Jabbateh had made a "mockery" of the U.S. asylum system that had been established to protect people fleeing from human rights abusers like himself.

Jabbateh was a commander or higher-ranking officer in ULIMO and ULIMO-K, and during that time he either personally committed, or ordered ULIMO troops under his command to commit the following list of acts:

1. The murder of civilian non-combatants
2. The sexual enslavement of women
3. The public raping of women
4. The maiming of civilian non-combatants
5. The torturing of civilian non-combatants
6. The enslavement of civilian non-combatants
7. The conscription of child soldiers
8. The execution of prisoners of war
9. The desecration and mutilation of corpses
10. The killing of persons because of race, religion, nationality, ethnic origin or political opinion

== Appeal ==
Jabbateh's conviction and sentence were unprecedented, both as the first conviction connected to the First Liberian Civil War and also for the length at 17 times the recommended sentence for such immigration offences, the longest ever sentence in the US for lying about war crimes on immigration forms. Jabbateh appealed to the US Court of Appeals for the Third Circuit in January 2020 on the basis that his crimes in Liberia did not amount to genocide. Circuit Judge Thomas L. Ambro noted the unusual length of the sentence and that it could be viewed as being imposed for his war crimes rather than his immigration offences. Jabbateh lost his appeal in September 2020. Judges Ambro, Paul Matey, and Julio M. Fuentes noted that some of the charges he was convicted of should not have been applied, but allowed them to stand because his lawyer had not objected. The forms filed in 2002 were beyond the statute of limitations, but the charges related to lying in a 2011 immigration interview despite the law only applying to written documents. They ruled that Judge Diamond correctly used his discretion in imposing the long sentence.

According to the Federal Bureau of Prisons website, Jabbateh is serving his sentence at Federal Correctional Institution, Allenwood Medium. He is scheduled for release on November 5, 2041. Jabbateh's inmate number is 75217-066.

== Personal life ==
Jabbateh was granted US political asylum on December 23, 1999. He settled in Lansdowne, where he remained until his conviction in October 2017. Jabbateh has a wife and five children who live in Philadelphia. Jabbateh also has an ex-wife and at least seven children who live in Liberia or elsewhere on the African continent, who he attempted to sponsor to immigrate to the US. Jabbateh started a shipping company in 2008, Jabateh Brothers Loading Services, which packages and ships containers to Liberia. It remains in operation.

Friends and family in his community around Philadelphia regarded him favorably. He does not hold a US passport and had not left the country since his arrival in 1998.
