= List of Liberian politicians =

The following is a list of Liberian politicians, both past and present.

== B ==
- Barclay, Arthur
- Barclay, Edwin
- Barnes, Nathaniel
- Benson, Stephen Allen
- Blah, Moses
- Blamo, John Bernard
- Boakai, Joseph Nyuma
- Boley, George
- Bright, William O. Davies
- Brown, Lewis
- Brumskine, Charles
- Bryant, Gyude

== C ==
- Captan, Monie
- Cheapoo, Chea
- Cheeseman, Joseph James
- Coleman, William David
- Conneh, Sekou
- Cooper, Isaac Joseph

== D ==
- Dennis, Charles Cecil
- Dennis, Gabriel Lafayette
- Divine, Samuel Raymond
- Doe, Jackson
- Doe, Samuel
- Dogolea, Enoch
- Dossen, J. J.
- Dukuly, Momolu
- Dukuly, Morris
- Dunbar, Charles Benedict
- Dweh, George

== E ==
- Eastman, Ernest

== F ==
- Fahnbulleh, Henry
- Farhat, David
- Faulkner, Thomas J. R.
- Matthew Flomo

== G ==
- Gardiner, Anthony William
- Gbala, David
- Gbollie, Fayah
- Gibson, Garretson Wilmot
- Greene, James Edward
- Grimes, Joseph Rudolph
- Grimes, Louis Arthur

== H ==
- Hanson, John
- Harris, Sion
- Henries, Richard
- Herring, Amos
- Hill, Samuel D.
- Howard, Daniel Edward

== J ==
- Jallah, Armah
- Johnson, J. Rudolph
- Johnson, Wesley
- Johnson, Prince Yormie
- Johnson Sirleaf, Ellen
- Johnson, Hilary R.W.
- Jayjay, Roosevelt Gasolin

== K ==
- Kesselley, Edward
- Kiadii, George
- Kieh, George Klay
- King, Charles D.B.
- Knuckles, Willis
- Konneh, Amara Mohamed
- Korto, Joseph
- Koukou, George
- Kowo, Janga Augustus
- Kpolleh, Gabriel
- Kpoto, Keikura
- Kpoto, Robert
- Kpormakor, David
- Kromah, Alhaji G.V.
- Kruah, Cooper
- Kuyon, Bismarck

== L ==
- Lansanah, Lahai Ghabye
- Larsah, Jr., James Nan

== M ==
- Massaquoi, Roland
- Matthews, Gabriel Baccus
- Minor, Grace Beatrice

Clarence K. Momolu

- Moniba, Harry
- Monkornomana, Nyudeh
- Morlu, John
- Muah, Sebastian
- Tokpah John Mulbah
- Musuleng-Cooper, Dorothy

== N ==
- Nimely, Thomas
- Nyenabo, Isaac
- Nimene, John Wilmot Wleh

== P ==
- Payne, James Spriggs
- Perry, Ruth
- Peal, Samuel Edward
- Priest, James M.

== R ==
- Reeves, Alfred
- Roberts, Joseph Jenkins
- Ross, J. J.
- Ross, Samuel Alfred
- Roye, Edward James
- Russell, Alfred Francis

== S ==
- Sankawulo, Wilton G.S.
- Sawyer, Amos
- Sheriff, Martin
- Sherman, Reginald
- Sherman, Varney
- Simpson, Clarence Lorenzo
- Sirleaf, Momolu
- Smith, James Skivring
- Snowe, Edwin
- Sorsor, Massayan K. (KMass)

== T ==
- Taylor, Charles
- Tipoteh, Togba-Nah
- Tokpa, Alaric
- Tokpah J. Mulbah
- Tolbert, Frank
- Tolbert, William
- Tor-Thompson, Margaret
- Townsend, E. Reginald
- Tubman, William V.S.
- Tubman (Jr.), William V.S.
- Tubman, Winston
- Twe, Didhwo
- Tyler, Alex

== U ==
- Varmah, Eddington

== W ==
- Warner, Bennie D.
- Warner, Daniel Bashiel
- Weah, George
- Weeks, Rocheforte Lafayette
- Wesley, Henry Too
- Woah-Tee, Joseph
- Wolokollie, Dusty
- Wotorson, Cletus

== Y ==
- Yancy, Allen
- Yates, Beverly
