= Politics of Liberia =

The Politics of Liberia takes place in a framework of a presidential representative democratic republic modeled on the government of the United States, whereby the president is the head of state and head of government; unlike the United States, however, Liberia is a unitary state as opposed to a federation and has a pluriform multi-party system rather than the two-party system that characterizes US politics. Executive power is exercised by the government. Legislative power is vested in both the government and the two chambers of the legislature.

Liberia's governmental system is based on the US model of a republic with three equal branches of government, though in reality, the President of Liberia has usually been the dominant force in Liberian politics. Following the dissolution of the Republican Party in 1876, the True Whig Party dominated the Liberian government until the 1980 coup, eventually creating what was effectively a stable, one-party state, with little politics in the usual sense. The longest-serving president in Liberian history was William Tubman, serving from 1944 until his death in 1971. The shortest term was held by James Skivring Smith, who was interim president for all of two months in 1871. However, the political process from Liberia's founding in 1847, despite widespread corruption, was very stable until the end of the First Republic in 1980.

This situation changed abruptly in 1980, with the revolt against the Americo-Liberians and their True Whig Party. Currently, no party has majority control of the legislature.

The Economist Intelligence Unit rated Liberia a "hybrid regime" in 2022.

== Political developments since 1980 ==
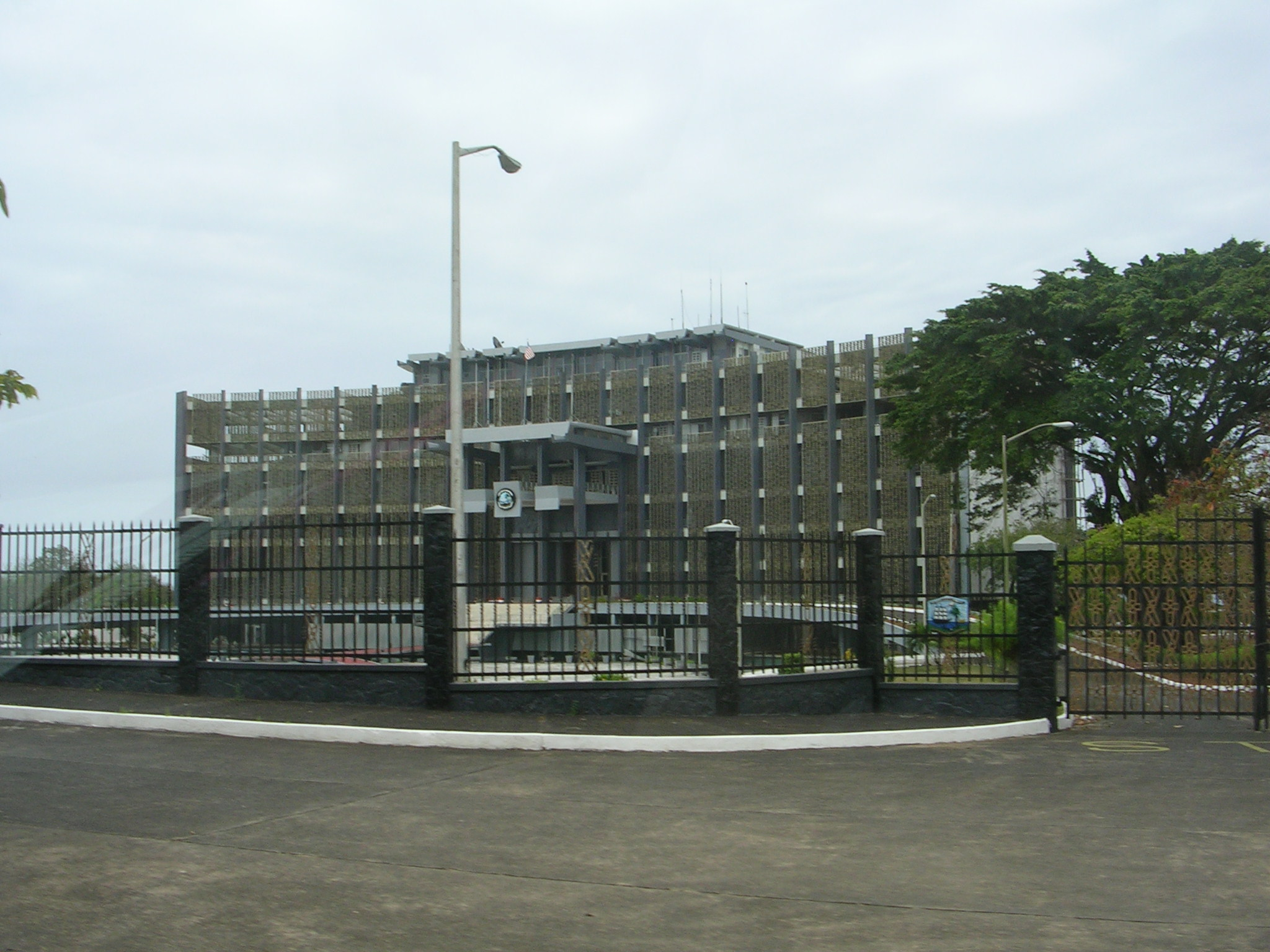
The Executive Mansion has been the home of Liberian Presidents since its construction in 1964. It has not been used since a fire in 2006.

Between 1980 and 2006, Liberia was governed by a series of military and transitional governments. The president of the last of these, Charles Taylor, was forced to step down in 2003, and the United Nations installed a transitional government. Elections to select a government to replace the transitional government took place in October and November 2005. (see 2005 Liberian general election).

In the 1980s, Samuel K. Doe's government increasingly adopted an ethnic outlook as members of his Krahn ethnic group soon dominated political and military life in Liberia. This caused a heightened level of ethnic tension leading to frequent hostilities between the politically and militarily dominant Krahns and other ethnic groups in the country.

Political parties remained banned until 1984. Elections were held on 15 October 1985 in which Doe's National Democratic Party of Liberia (NDPL) was declared the winner. The elections were characterized by widespread fraud and rigging. The period after the elections saw increased human rights abuses, corruption, and ethnic tensions. The standard of living, which had been rising in the 1970s, declined drastically.

On 12 November 1985, former Army Commanding General Thomas Quiwonkpa invaded Liberia by way of neighboring Sierra Leone and almost succeeded in toppling the government of Samuel Doe. Members of the Krahn-dominated Armed Forces of Liberia repelled Quiwonkpa's attack and executed him in Monrovia.

On 24 December 1989, a small band of rebels led by Doe's former procurement chief, Charles Taylor invaded Liberia from Ivory Coast. Taylor and his National Patriotic Front rebels rapidly gained the support of Liberians because of the repressive nature of Samuel Doe and his government. Barely six months after the rebels first attacked, they had reached the outskirts of Monrovia.

The First and Second Liberian Civil War, which was one of Africa's bloodiest, claimed the lives of more than 200,000 Liberians and further displaced a million others into refugee camps in neighboring countries.

The Economic Community of West African States (ECOWAS) intervened and succeeded in preventing Charles Taylor from capturing Monrovia. Prince Johnson who had been a member of Taylor's National Patriotic Front of Liberia (NPFL) but broke away because of policy differences, formed the Independent National Patriotic Front of Liberia (INPFL). Johnson's forces captured and killed Doe on 9 September 1990.

An Interim Government of National Unity (IGNU) was formed in Gambia under the auspices of ECOWAS in October 1990 and Dr. Amos Sawyer became president. Taylor refused to work with the interim government and continued war.

By 1992, several warring factions had emerged in the Liberian civil war, all of which were absorbed in the new transitional government. After several peace accords and declining military power, Taylor finally agreed to the formation of a five-man transitional government.

After considerable progress in negotiations conducted by the United States, United Nations, Organization of African Unity, and the Economic Community of West African States, disarmament and demobilization of warring factions were hastily carried out and special elections were held on 19 July 1997 with Charles Taylor and his National Patriotic Party emerging victorious. Taylor won the election by a large majority, primarily because Liberians feared a return to war had Taylor lost.

Unrest continued, and by 2003, two rebel groups were challenging Taylor's control of the country. In August 2003, Taylor resigned and fled the country and vice-president Moses Blah became acting president. On 18 August 2003, the warring parties signed the Accra Comprehensive Peace Agreement which marked the political end of the conflict.

The international community again intervened and helped set up a transitional government (National Transitional Government of Liberia) which was led by Gyude Bryant until the Liberian general election of 2005.

For more than a year, over 9,000 census-takers combed the densely forested nation mapping every structure. For three days starting 21 March 2008, they revisited each dwelling and counted the inhabitants.

In November 2011, President Ellen Johnson-Sirleaf was re-elected for a second six-year term. Following the 2017 Liberian general election, former professional football striker George Weah, considered one of the greatest African players of all time, was sworn in as president on January 22, 2018, becoming the fourth youngest serving president in Africa. The inauguration marked Liberia's first fully democratic transition in 74 years. Weah cited fighting corruption, reforming the economy, combating illiteracy, and improving life conditions as the main targets of his presidency. Opposition leader Joseph Boakai defeated George Weah in the tightly contested 2023 presidential election. On 22 January 2024, Joseph Boakai was sworn in as Liberia's new president.

== Executive branch ==
Main office-holders
Office	Name	Party	Since
President	Joseph Boakai	Unity Party	22 January 2024
Vice President	Jeremiah Koung	Movement for Democracy and Reconstruction	22 January 2024

The president is elected by popular vote for a six-year term (renewable). The cabinet is appointed by the president and confirmed by the Senate.

== Legislative branch ==
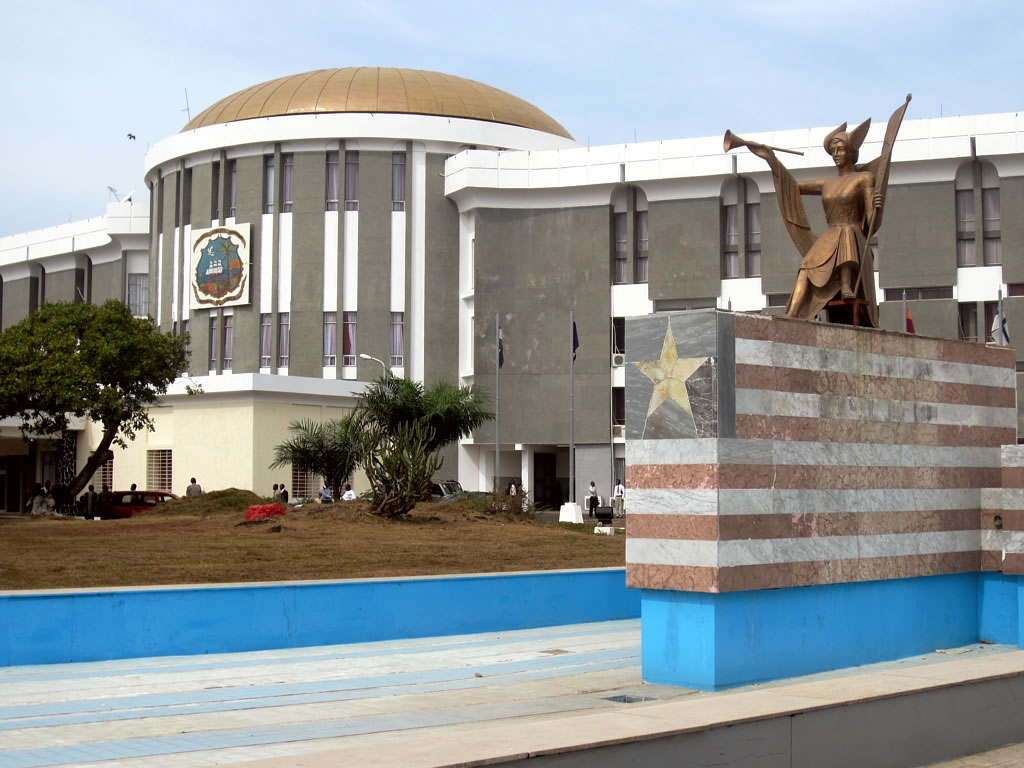
Legislature of Liberia.

Liberia has a bicameral Legislature that consists of the Senate (30 seats; members elected by popular vote to serve nine-year terms) and the House of Representatives (73 seats; members elected by popular vote to serve six-year terms)

== Political parties and elections ==
=== Presidential elections ===
Candidate	Running mate	Party	First round		Second round	
Candidate	Running mate	Party	Votes	%	Votes	%
George Weah	Jewel Taylor	Coalition for Democratic Change	596,037	38.37	732,185	61.54
Joseph Boakai	Emmanuel James Nuquay	Unity Party	446,716	28.76	457,579	38.46
Charles Brumskine	Harrison S. Karnwea Sr.	Liberty Party	149,495	9.62		
Prince Johnson	Audrian R. Smith-Forbes	Movement for Democracy and Reconstruction	127,666	8.22		
Alexander B. Cummings Jr.	Jeremiah Sulunteh	Alternative National Congress	112,067	7.21		
Benoni Urey	Alexander Nyonkon Duopu	All Liberian Party	24,246	1.56		
Joseph Mills Jones	Samuel B. Reeves Jr.	Movement for Economic Empowerment	12,854	0.83		
MacDella Cooper	William R. Slocum	Liberia Restoration Party	11,645	0.75		
Henry Boimah Fahnbulleh	Marcus S.G. Dahn	Liberian People's Party	11,560	0.74		
Oscar Cooper	Wonderr Koryenen Freeman	Independent	10,381	0.67		
MacDonald A. Wento	John N. Bleah	United People's Party	8,968	0.58		
Simeon C. M. Freeman	William T. Knowlden	Movement for Progressive Change	6,682	0.43		
Isaac Gbombadee Wiles	Richmond D. K. Yarkpah	Democratic Justice Party	6,379	0.41		
Aloysius William Kpadeh	John S. Partor	Independent	5,922	0.38		
Kennedy Gbleyah Sandy	Victoria Morris Tweh	Liberia Transformation Party	5,343	0.34		
George Sluwer Dweh Sr.	Annie Y. Tuazama	Redemption Democratic Congress	4,935	0.32		
William Wiah Tuider	Dave L. Dixon	New Liberia Party	4,920	0.32		
Jeremiah Z. Whapoe	Isaac D. G. Flowers	Vision for Liberia Transformation	3,946	0.25		
Yarkpajuwur N. Mator	Ruth L. Kollie	Independent	1,940	0.12		
Wendell J. E. McIntosh	Manjerngie Cecelia Ndebe	Change Democratic Action	1,646	0.11		
Total			1,553,348	100.00	1,189,764	100.00
Valid votes			1,553,348	94.61	1,189,764	97.67
Invalid/blank votes			88,574	5.39	28,360	2.33
Total votes			1,641,922	100.00	1,218,124	100.00
Registered voters/turnout			2,183,629	75.19	2,183,629	55.78

=== House of Representatives elections ===
Party	Votes	%	Seats	+/–
Coalition for Democratic Change (CDC–NPP–LPDP)	239,754	15.57	21	+7
Unity Party	220,508	14.32	20	−4
Liberty Party	131,980	8.57	3	−4
Alternative National Congress	93,475	6.07	0	New
People's Unification Party	90,421	5.87	5	New
All Liberian Party	77,013	5.00	3	New
Movement for Economic Empowerment	59,268	3.85	1	New
Movement for Democracy and Reconstruction	56,734	3.69	2	New
Coalition for Liberia's Progress	50,732	3.30	0	New
Liberia Transformation Party	49,621	3.22	1	0
United People's Party	47,357	3.08	1	New
Victory for Change Party	28,385	1.84	1	+1
Liberian People's Party	24,287	1.58	1	New
Vision for Liberia Transformation	21,324	1.39	0	New
Grassroot Democratic Party of Liberia	20,588	1.34	0	0
Liberia National Union	20,227	1.31	1	+1
Movement for Progressive Change	19,980	1.30	0	−2
True Whig Party	14,723	0.96	0	New
Liberia Restoration Party	11,690	0.76	0	New
Democratic Justice Party	7,415	0.48	0	New
Change Democratic Action	7,166	0.47	0	New
Redemption Democratic Congress	5,731	0.37	0	New
Liberians for Prosperity	628	0.04	0	New
New Liberia Party	494	0.03	0	New
Independents	240,001	15.59	13	−2
Total	1,539,502	100.00	73	0
Valid votes	1,539,502	94.86		
Invalid/blank votes	83,427	5.14		
Total votes	1,622,929	100.00		
Registered voters/turnout	2,183,629	74.32		

=== Senate elections ===
Party	Votes	%	Seats
Congress for Democratic Change	135,897	29.78	2
Liberty Party	52,351	11.47	2
Unity Party	47,123	10.33	4
National Patriotic Party	27,602	6.05	1
People's Unification Party	22,528	4.94	1
Alternative National Congress	18,917	4.15	1
Alliance for Peace and Democracy	18,410	4.03	0
National Democratic Coalition	5,726	1.25	1
Union of Liberian Democrats	4,092	0.90	0
Liberia Transformation Party	3,680	0.81	0
Grassroot Democratic Party of Liberia	3,154	0.69	0
Movement for Progressive Change	3,038	0.67	0
Liberia National Union	1,779	0.39	0
Victory for Change Party	1,266	0.28	0
Independents	110,707	24.26	3
Total	456,270	100.00	15
Valid votes	456,270	95.07	
Invalid/blank votes	23,666	4.93	
Total votes	479,936	100.00	
Registered voters/turnout	1,903,229	25.22	

=== By county ===
The following are the results for the 2014 Senate elections from the National Elections Commission.

2014 Bomi County Senatorial election
Party	Candidate	Votes	%
UP	Morris Gato Saytumah	8,857	47.1%
NPP	Lahai Gbabye Lansanah	6,837	36.3%
Independent	Michael Abou Jones	1,318	7.0%
CDC	Duannah A. Kamara	537	2.9%
Independent	Neh Dukuly Tolbert	421	2.2%
LTP	Abraham Abraham Nyei	291	1.5%
LP	Hajah Sheri Washington	218	1.2%
Independent	Gbatokai F. M. Dakinah	145	0.8%
ANC	Frances Johnson Morris Allison	137	0.7%
MPC	Dwolu Murvee Anderson Sr.	56	0.3%
Total votes		18,817	100.0

2014 Bong County Senatorial election
Party	Candidate	Votes	%
NPP	Jewel C. Howard-Taylor	13,672	35.2%
Independent	Henrique Flomo Tokpa	11,737	30.2%
UP	Ranney Banama Jackson	4,038	10.4%
LP	Franklin Obed Siakor	2,497	6.4%
CDC	Augustus Jonathan Flomo	2,265	5.8%
GDPL	Martin Fahnlon Kerkula Sr.	1,213	3.1%
NDC	Edwin Tokpa Juah	872	2.2%
LINU	James Karpee Saybay	681	1.8%
Independent	Numehn Owen Dunbar	533	1.4%
VCP	Benedict Kpakama Sagbeh	386	1.0%
ANC	James Yarkpawolo Gbarbea Jr.	375	1.0%
LTP	Jefferson Gbaryan	342	0.9%
MPC	Mator M. F. Kpangbai	201	0.5%
Total votes		38,812	100.0

2014 Gbarpolu County Senatorial election
Party	Candidate	Votes	%
ANC	Daniel Flomo Naatehn Sr.	3,962	34.3%
UP	Gertrude Tene Lamin	1,906	16.5%
CDC	Nathaniel Farlo McGill	1,636	14.2%
APD	J. S. B. Theodore Momo Jr.	1,431	12.4%
LP	Sumoward Edwin Harris	1,241	10.7%
PUP	Fatuma Mamie Zinnah	1,159	10.0%
NDC	Alaric K. Tokpa	219	1.9%
Total votes		11,554	100.0

2014 Grand Bassa County Senatorial election
Party	Candidate	Votes	%
LP	Jonathan Lambort Kaipay	16,296	57.4%
Independent	Gbehzohngar Milton Findley	10,306	36.3%
Independent	Gabriel B. Smith	1,353	4.8%
ANC	Siokin Civicus Barsi-Giah	236	0.8%
CDC	Solomon James Murray	213	0.7%
Total votes		28,404	100.0

2014 Grand Cape Mount County Senatorial election
Party	Candidate	Votes	%
UP	Varney Sherman	13,651	61.7%
CDC	Fodee Kromah	3,431	15.5%
NPP	Abel Momodu Massalay	1,131	5.1%
ANC	Simeon Boima Taylor	1,083	4.9%
ULD	James Kormah Momo	884	4.0%
PUP	Victor Varney Watson	654	3.0%
NDC	Matthew V. Z. Darblo Sr.	582	2.6%
LP	Jesse Zinnah Segbo	440	2.0%
LTP	Mohammed Abraham Ware Sr.	181	0.8%
Independent	Elizabeth G. M. Armstrong	52	0.2%
GDPL	Henrietta Victoria Kandakai	38	0.2%
Total votes		22,127	100.0

2014 Grand Gedeh County Senatorial election
Party	Candidate	Votes	%
CDC	A. Marshall Dennis	6,148	35.9%
Independent	Zoe Emmanuel Pennue	3,273	19.1%
PUP	George Saigbe Boley Sr.	2,146	12.5%
LP	Thomas Yaya Nimely	2,109	12.3%
MPC	Charles Gaye Breeze Jr.	1,076	6.3%
Independent	Samuel Kanyon Doe Jr.	870	5.1%
NDC	George Sluwar Dweh Sr.	509	3.0%
APD	Cyrus S. Cooper II	388	2.3%
ANC	William K. Glay Sr.	221	1.3%
NPP	William Y. Glay	196	1.1%
GDPL	Cecilia K. Towah	190	1.1%
Total votes		17,126	100.0

2014 Grand Kru County Senatorial election
Party	Candidate	Votes	%
Independent	Albert Tugbe Chie	5,619	45.4%
UP	Rosalind Segbe Tonne Sneh	2,781	22.5%
Independent	Samuel E. S. Badio	1,551	12.5%
APD	Gbenimah Balu Slopadoe I	879	7.1%
MPC	Patrice Pokar Weah	611	4.9%
NDC	Amos Yonkon Bartu	576	4.7%
ANC	Joseph N. Kpanie II	362	2.9%
Total votes		12,379	100.0

2014 Lofa County Senatorial election
Party	Candidate	Votes	%
LP	Stephen J. H. Zargo	12,797	26.2%
APD	Joseph Kpator Jallah	8,554	17.5%
Independent	Alhaji G. V. Kromah	7,127	14.6%
PUP	Sumo G. Kupee	6,288	12.9%
ANC	Stanley S. Kparkillen	4,855	9.9%
CDC	Galakpai Woizee Kortimai	3,570	7.3%
UP	Francis Mazuwu Carbah	2,966	6.1%
Independent	Fomba Varlee Sannoh	1,870	3.8%
GDPL	Gladys G. Y. Beyan	785	1.6%
Total votes		48,812	100.0

2014 Margibi County Senatorial election
Party	Candidate	Votes	%
PUP	Jim Womba Tornonlah	7,893	30.5%
CDC	Ansu Dao Sonii	6,640	25.7%
NPP	Saah Richard Gbollie	2,696	10.4%
ANC	J. Stanley Nyumah	2,280	8.8%
LP	Clarice Alpha Jah	1,967	7.6%
ULD	Roland C. Kaine	1,712	6.6%
GDPL	William Garway Sharpe	928	3.6%
UP	Edna Araminta Lloyd	715	2.8%
Independent	Gabriel Gahie Bedell Jr.	349	1.3%
APD	William R. Slocum	272	1.1%
LTP	Pennoh Wreh Bestman	196	0.8%
MPC	B. Abraham F. Tengbeh	155	0.6%
NDC	John Fayah Josiah	66	0.3%
Total votes		25,869	100.0

2014 Maryland County Senatorial election
Party	Candidate	Votes	%
Independent	J. Gbleh-bo Brown	5,192	32.7%
CDC	Bhofal Chambers	5,116	32.2%
PUP	Isaac Blalu Roland	2,122	13.4%
NPP	James N. Anderson II	1,101	6.9%
UP	John A. Ballout Jr.	877	5.5%
ANC	Thomas G. Bedell	621	3.9%
ULD	Abraham Botimo Jackson	506	3.2%
LP	Roosevelt S. Kla-Fleh	339	2.1%
Total votes		15,874	100.0

2014 Montserrado County Senatorial election
Party	Candidate	Votes	%
CDC	George Weah	99,226	78.0%
Independent	Robert Alvin Sirleaf	13,692	10.8%
LP	Benjamin Robert Sanvee	4,410	3.5%
Independent	Christopher Zeohn Neyor	3,730	2.9%
LTP	Sheikh Al Moustapha Kouyateh	2,348	1.8%
LINU	Nathaniel T. Blama Sr.	1,098	0.9%
Independent	Miatta Aries Fahnbulleh	970	0.8%
UP	Ali Sylla	610	0.5%
Independent	J. Musu Freeman-Sumo	427	0.3%
Independent	Celia Cuffy-Brown	396	0.3%
PUP	James Laveli Supuwood	331	0.3%
Total votes		127,238	100.0

2014 Nimba County Senatorial election
Party	Candidate	Votes	%
Independent	Prince Johnson	37,932	66.6%
LP	Edith Lianue Gongloe-Weh	9,471	16.6%
CDC	Yamie QuiQui Gbeisay Sr.	5,941	10.4%
ANC	Peter Y. B. Weato	2,210	3.9%
NDC	Joseph D. Z. Korto	943	1.7%
NPP	John Leagar Teah	426	0.7%
Total votes		56,923	100.0

2014 Rivercess County Senatorial election
Party	Candidate	Votes	%
NDC	Francis Saturday Paye	1,959	22.8%
UP	Wellington Geevon Smith	1,278	14.9%
ANC	J. Josephus Burgess Sr.	1,010	11.7%
VCP	Bob Tompoe-Ziankahn	880	10.2%
MPC	Rosana Glaypohkpay D. H. Schaack	687	8.0%
PUP	Jay Jonathan Banney	627	7.3%
NPP	Victor Missiongar Wilson	611	7.1%
LP	D. Onesimus Banwon	566	6.6%
APD	Jerry Vogar Geedeh	441	5.1%
ULD	Emmanuel S. Toe	312	3.6%
CDC	Teplah P. Reeves	143	1.7%
Independent	Minnie Travers Tomah	82	1.0%
Total votes		8,596	100.0

2014 River Gee County Senatorial election
Party	Candidate	Votes	%
UP	Conmany Wesseh	2,672	26.1%
APD	Jonathan Boycharles Sogbie	1,719	16.8%
ANC	Daniel G. Johnson	1,565	15.3%
PUP	Charles Korkor Bardyl	1,308	12.8%
Independent	Andrew Nyenpan Saytue Sr.	1,031	10.1%
CDC	Alexander P. B. Yeaher	742	7.3%
ULD	Geetor Sarku Saydee	678	6.6%
LTP	Michael A. Cooper	322	3.1%
NPP	G. Saygbegee Davis Sr.	193	1.9%
Total votes		10,230	100.0

2014 Sinoe County Senatorial election
Party	Candidate	Votes	%
UP	Juojulue Milton Teahjay	6,772	50.1%
APD	Mobutu Vlah Nyenpan	4,726	35.0%
NPP	Delcontee Juah Wleh Sr.	739	5.5%
Independent	Michael Geegbae Mueller	427	3.2%
Independent	Oscar Jaryee Quiah	304	2.3%
CDC	Richmond Nagbe Tobii	289	2.1%
MPC	Klahn-Gboloh Jarbah	252	1.9%
Total votes		13,509	100.0

== Judicial branch ==
There is a Supreme Court, criminal courts, and appeals court and magistrate courts in the counties. There also are traditional courts and lay courts in the counties. Trial by ordeal is practiced in various parts of Liberia.

== Administrative divisions ==
The basic unit of local government is the town chief. There are clan chiefs, paramount chiefs, and district commissioners. The counties are governed by superintendents appointed by the President. There are fifteen counties in Liberia.

#	County	Capital	Established	Area (km^{2})	Population (2008 Census)
1	Bomi	Tubmanburg	1984	1,932	84,119
2	Bong	Gbarnga	1964	8,754	333,481
3	Gbarpolu	Bopulu	2001	9,953	83,388
4	Grand Bassa	Buchanan	1847	7,814	221,693
5	Grand Cape Mount	Robertsport	1856	4,781	127,076
6	Grand Gedeh	Zwedru	1964	10,855	125,258
7	Grand Kru	Barclayville	1984	3,895	57,913
8	Lofa	Voinjama	1964	9,982	276,863
9	Margibi	Kakata	1985	2,691	209,923
10	Maryland	Harper	1857	2,297	135,938
11	Montserrado	Bensonville	1847	1,880	1,118,241
12	Nimba	Sanniquellie	1964	11,551	462,026
13	Rivercess	Rivercess	1985	5,564	71,509
14	River Gee	Fish Town	2000	5,113	66,789
15	Sinoe	Greenville	1847	9,764	102,391

== International organization participation ==
ACP, AfDB, CCC, ECA, ECOWAS, FAO, G-77, IAEA, IBRD, ICAO, ICFTU, ICRM, IDA, IFAD, IFC, IFRCS, ILO, IMF, IMO, Inmarsat, Intelsat (nonsignatory user), Interpol, IOC, IOM, ITU, NAM, OAU, OPCW, UN, UNCTAD, UNESCO, UNIDO, UPU, WCL, WFTU, WHO, WIPO, WMO

== See also ==
- List of government ministries of Liberia
- List of Liberian politicians
