= List of political parties in Liberia =

This article lists political parties in Liberia. Liberia has a multi-party system with numerous political parties, in which no one party often has a chance of gaining power alone, and parties must work with each other to form coalition governments. Membership in parties tends to be fluid, as the party leader at the time holds significant influence over the ideology the party follows. As such, switching parties is more common than in other countries.

== Represented parties ==
Party		Abbr.	Ideology	Leader	Senate seats	House seats
Coalition for Democratic; Change	Congress for Democratic Change	CDC	Populism	Mulbah K. Morlu	9 / 30	25 / 73
Coalition for Democratic; Change	National Patriotic Party	NPP	Militarism	James Biney	9 / 30	25 / 73
Coalition for Democratic; Change	People's Democratic Party of Liberia	PDLP	Liberal democracy		9 / 30	25 / 73
Coalition for Democratic; Change	Union of Liberian Democrats	ULD	Liberal democracy	Solomon G. Khan	9 / 30	25 / 73
Coalition for Democratic; Change	United People's Party	UPP	African socialism	MacDonald A. Wento	9 / 30	25 / 73
Coalition for Democratic; Change	Change Democratic Action	CDA	Liberal democracy		9 / 30	25 / 73
Coalition for Democratic; Change	Movement for Economic Empowerment	MOVEE	Liberalism		9 / 30	25 / 73
Unity Party		UP	Christian democracy	Luther Tarpeh	3 / 30	11 / 73
Collaborating; Political; Parties	Alternative National Congress	ANC	Social liberalism	Alexander Cummings	3 / 30	6 / 73
Collaborating; Political; Parties	Liberty Party	LP	Liberalism; Federalism	Charlyne Brumskine	3 / 30	6 / 73
Movement for Democracy and Reconstruction		MDR	Christian democracy	Prince Johnson	2 / 30	4 / 73
People's Unification Party		PUP	Social Liberalism	Samuel Kogar	1 / 30	2 / 73
All Liberian Party		ALP	Agrarianism	Benoni Urey	1 / 30	1 / 73
Liberia Restoration Party		LRP	Christian right	Gabriel Salee	1 / 30	1 / 73
Liberia National Union		LNU	Christian democracy	Jerome Slojue	0 / 30	1 / 73
Movement for Progressive Change		MPC	Conservative liberalism	O’neal Passawe	0 / 30	1 / 73
National Democratic Coalition		NDC	African socialism	Alaric K. Tokpa	0 / 30	1 / 73
Vision for Liberia Transformation		VOLT	Social democracy	Jeremiah Z. Whapoe	0 / 30	1 / 73

== Unrepresented parties ==
- All Liberia Coalition Party
- Grassroots Development Movement
- Liberia National Union
- Liberia Transformation Party
- Liberian People's Party
- People's Liberation Party
- Rainbow Alliance
  - Democratic Justice Party
  - True Whig Party
  - Victory for Change
- Union of Liberian Democrats

== Historical parties ==
- Free Democratic Party
- Freedom Alliance Party of Liberia
- Labor Party of Liberia
- Liberia Destiny Party
- Liberia Education and Development Party
- Liberia Equal Rights Party
- Liberia Unification Party
- Liberian Action Party
- Movement for Justice in Africa
- National Democratic Party of Liberia
- National Party of Liberia
- National Reformation Party
- National Union for Democratic Progress
- National Vision Party of Liberia
- New Deal Movement
- Progressive Alliance of Liberia
- Progressive Democratic Party
- Republican Party
- Reformed United Liberia Party

== See also ==
- Politics of Liberia
