= Bong-2 =

Electoral district in Liberia

- Constituency for the House of Representatives of Liberia
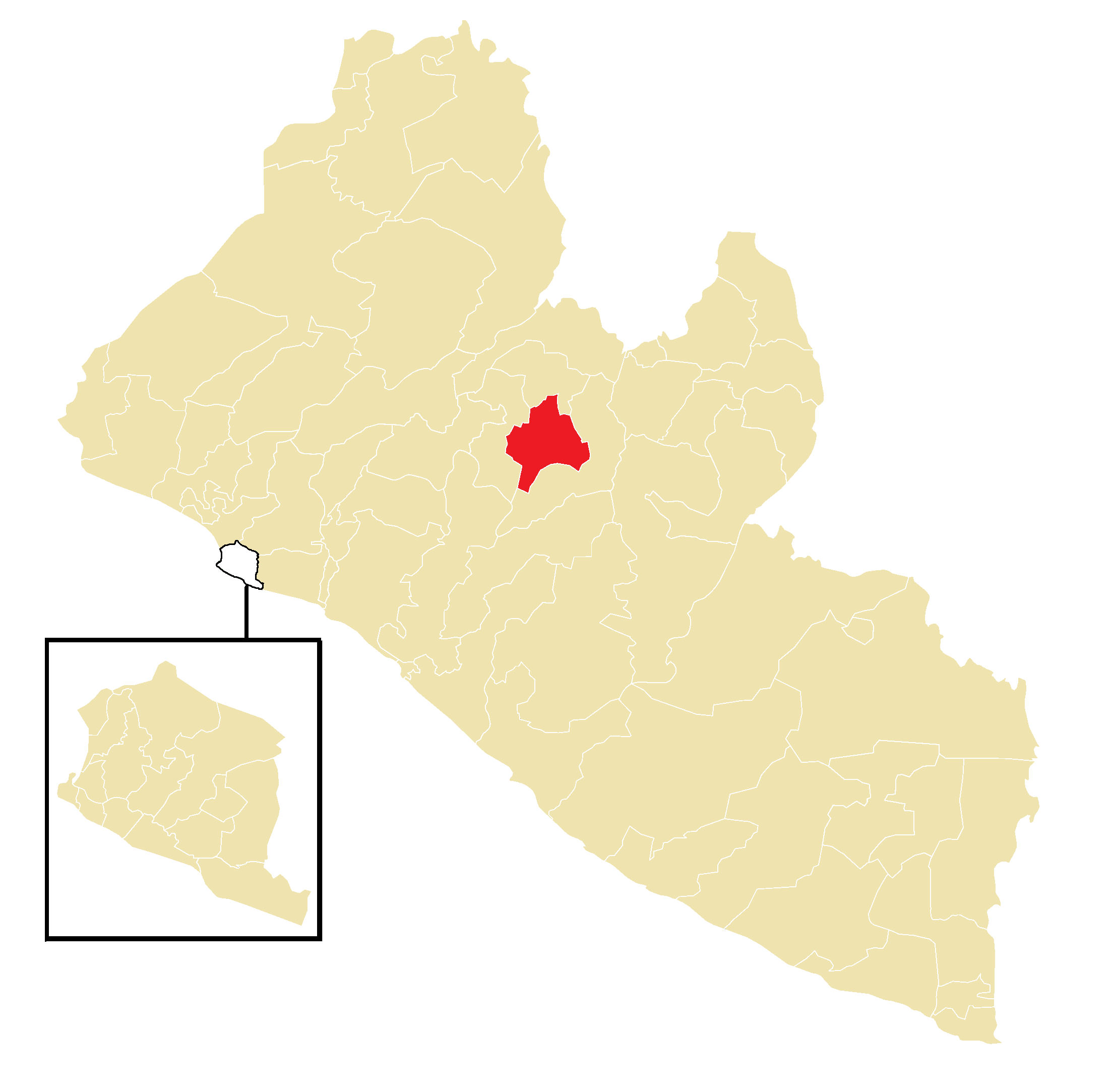
- Electorate: 30,691 (2023)

Current constituency
- Created: 2011
- Representative: James M. Kolleh

Bong-2 is an electoral district for the elections to the House of Representatives of Liberia. The constituency covers three wards of Gbanga city (wards 5, 8 and 9), 10 communities of Jorquelleh District (i.e. Kolleta-Mula-Two, Beh-Lah-Three, Beletanta-Two, Tomue-Five, Mano-Weasue-Three, Samay-One, Jankpayah-Four, Gbenequellen-Two, Tamay Ta-One, Janyea-Four) and 2 communities of Yeallequelleh District (i.e. Yeanawoun-One and Garwuquelleh-Two).

== Elected representatives ==
Year	Representative elected	Party	Notes
2005	Adam Bill Corneh	NPP	
2011	Prince K. Moye	UP	
2017	Prince K. Moye	UP	Resigned after elected to Senate.
2021	James M. Kolleh	PUP	
2023	James M. Kolleh	PUP	

== Election results ==
2005 Bong County's 2nd House District Election
Candidate	Party	Votes	%
Adam Bill Corneh	National Patriotic Party	2,354	16.10
Molley Briggs	Reformed United Liberia Party	2,147	14.69
Adib Kolleh N. Abi-Rached	Freedom Alliance Party of Liberia	2,079	14.22
Sarah Famata Baysah	Congress for Democratic Change	1,829	12.51
Woiwor Johnson Baysah	Labor Party of Liberia	1,660	11.36
George Lamie Sallay Jr.	Unity Party	1,310	8.96
Joseph Lee Rogers	Coalition for the Transformation of Liberia	1,027	7.03
George G. Gbah	Liberty Party	1,024	7.01
James S. Kpateh	National Democratic Party of Liberia	772	5.28
Jerome Billy Joss	United Democratic Alliance	416	2.85
Total		14,618	100.00
Valid votes		14,618	91.21
Invalid/blank votes		1,408	8.79
Total votes		16,026	100.00

2011 Bong County's 2nd House District Election
Candidate	Party	Votes	%
Prince K. Moye	Unity Party	9,443	65.19
James Karpee Saybay	Liberty Party	2,107	14.55
C. Morris Sumo Kollie	Alliance for Peace and Democracy	826	5.70
Omolu J. Kpangbai	Liberia Transformation Party	602	4.16
Aaron Jutomu Larteh	National Democratic Party of Liberia	432	2.98
Yamah Datimah Flomo	National Union for Democratic Progress	391	2.70
Esther Yeimah M. Walker	National Patriotic Party	354	2.44
Jonathan M. Bass	National Social Democratic Party of Liberia	331	2.28
Total		14,486	100.00
Valid votes		14,486	92.32
Invalid/blank votes		1,205	7.68
Total votes		15,691	100.00

2017 Bong County's 2nd House District Election
Candidate	Party	Votes	%
Prince K. Moye (Incumbent)	Unity Party	11,502	61.91
Melvin K. Salvage	Liberty Party	3,771	20.30
Matthew Siakor Jr.	Alternative National Congress	3,307	17.80
Total		18,580	100.00
Valid votes		18,580	92.47
Invalid/blank votes		1,514	7.53
Total votes		20,094	100.00

2021 Bong County 2nd House District By-election
Candidate	Party	Votes	%
James M. Kolleh	People's Unification Party	4,283	33.28
Melvin K. Salvage	Coalition for Democratic Change	3,882	30.17
Edward Emmanuel Gboe	Independent	2,497	19.40
Joshua D. K. Better	Collaborating Political Parties	798	6.20
James Mulbah Tartor	Movement for Progressive Change	308	2.39
Lawunkono Jefferson Blackie	Rainbow Alliance	270	2.10
Jerry Kerkulah Kollie	Independent	263	2.04
James F. Mulbah Totaye Ngenda	Independent	243	1.89
James Karpee Saybay	Liberia Restoration Party	147	1.14
Matthew Siakor Jr.	Liberia National Union	110	0.85
Joe K. Better	Movement for One Liberia	36	0.28
Paasewe Yarkpawolo Jr.	Independent	31	0.24
Total		12,868	100.00
Valid votes		12,868	95.57
Invalid/blank votes		596	4.43
Total votes		13,464	100.00
