= Reformation Alliance Party =

Political party in Liberia

Party symbol

The Reformation Alliance Party (RAP) is a political party in Liberia. It participated in the 1997 elections and fielded candidates in the 11 October 2005 elections as part of the United Democratic Alliance (UDA) coalition.

== Elections ==
In 1997, RAP presidential candidate Henry Boimah Fahnbulleh won 0.33% of the vote while the party failed to win any representation in the bicameral legislature.

In 2005, the RAP joined the United Democratic Alliance (UDA) coalition. UDA candidate John Morlu won 1.2% of the vote in the presidential poll. The coalition won one seat in the Senate and none in the House of Representatives.
