= People's Democratic Party of Liberia =

Political party in Liberia

The People's Democratic Party of Liberia (PDPL) is a political party in Liberia. It participated in the 1997 elections and fielded candidates in the 11 October 2005 elections as part of the four-party Coalition for the Transformation of Liberia (COTOL).

== History ==
In 1997, PDPL presidential candidate George T. Washington won 0.56% of the vote while the party failed to win any representation in the bicameral Legislature.

In 2005, COTOL candidate Varney Sherman won 7.8% of the vote in the presidential poll. The coalition won eight seats in the Senate and seven in the House of Representatives. Both the PDPL and the LAP withdrew from COTOL in 2006, effectively ending the coalition.

The party was disqualified from contesting the 2011 presidential and legislative elections.

In 2015, the party joined a political alliance with the People's Democratic Party of Liberia to form the Coalition for Democratic Change. Their leader is George Weah.

The alliance won in the 2017 general election.

In 2024, the party withdrew from the Coalition for Democratic Change (CDC), after being a founding member in 2016.
