= Armah Jallah =

Liberian politician

Armah Zolu Jallah is a Liberian politician and member of the National Patriotic Party (NPP). Senator Armah Zolu Jallah replaced Cllr. Eddington Varmah in the Senate in 1998 as Senator of Lofa County in a by-election he won by about 70%. The creation of Gbarpolu was the result of a pledge he made in the by-election to replace Eddington Varmah. He mobilized the people of Gbarma and Bopolu Statutory Districts for this purpose. He attended both the Gbarma and Bopolu meetings that initiated plans for the creation of Gbarpolu County during the Taylor administration.

Though Senator Jallah was a member of the National Patriotic Party, he stood against some of the policies of the party and government such as abuse of human rights without investigation, and abuse of private property rights. He is an advocate of social justice and utilization of political means, instead of military power to solve armed conflicts. He specifically opposed the Strategic Commodity Bill intended to nationalize all private rights in the country and the New Forestry Reform Law of Liberia, intended to expropriate private property rights to logging companies. He supported the bill for the establishment of a National Bureau of Investigation (NBI) intended to bring experienced personnel into the security sector of the country He advocated for reform to the act creating the National Commission on Human Rights to conform to international standards, and advocated for a small regulatory government with a large market economy.

He is currently the largest private investor in Gbarpolu County with the construction of a 25 bedroom guest house under construction in Bopolu City, and a major gas station at Bomi and Gbarpolu counties North Western border. He contested the by-election in 2007 on the petition of his people for Gbarpolu County to replace the late Senator Tormetie but lost to the Unity Party candidate.

During the General Elections of October 2011, as a candidate of the National Patriotic Party, Jallah won the Senatorial seat for Gbarpolu County, ahead of incumbent Daniel Naatehn. With this victory, he was the first person in Liberian history to win senatorial seats in two counties.

During the mid-term elections of December 2014, the incumbent President Pro Tempore, Gbezohngar Findley of Grand Bassa County lost his seat. In special elections to fill this vacancy on 12 February 2015, Senator Jallah defeated Sinoe Senator Joseph Nagbe and Margibi Senator Oscar Cooper to become the President Pro Tempore of the Senate of Liberia.

Running as the National Party of Liberia (NPL) presidential candidate in the 11 October 2005 elections, Jallah placed 18th out of 22 candidates, receiving 0.4% of the vote.
