= United Democratic Alliance (Liberia) =

Liberian political party

The United Democratic Alliance (UDA) is a coalition of three Liberian political parties - the Liberia National Union (LINU), Liberia Education and Development Party (LEAD), and the Reformation Alliance Party (RAP) - that contested the 2005 Liberian general election.

UDA candidate John Morlu won 1.2% of the vote in the presidential poll. The coalition won no Senate seats and one in the House of Representatives.

The party was disqualified from contesting the 2011 presidential and legislative elections.
