= National Party of Liberia =

Political party in Liberia

The National Party of Liberia (NPL) is a political party in Liberia. It fielded candidates in the 11 October 2005 elections.

NPL candidate Armah Jallah won 0.4% of the vote in the presidential poll. The party failed to win any seats in the Senate or House of Representatives.

The party was disqualified from contesting the 2011 presidential and legislative elections.
