= Free Democratic Party (Liberia) =

Political party in Liberia

Party logo

The Free Democratic Party (FDP) is a political party in Liberia. It participated in the 1997 Liberian elections and fielded candidates in the 11 October 2005 elections.

== Elections ==
In 1997, FDP presidential candidate Fayah Gbollie won 0.32% of the vote while the party failed to win any representation in the bicameral legislature. In 2000, the party joined the Collaborating Political Parties framework, which planned to challenge the ruling National Patriotic Party at the next elections.

In 2005, FDP candidate David Farhat won 0.5% of the vote in the presidential poll. The party failed to win any seats in the Senate or House of Representatives.

The FDP joined the National Democratic Coalition prior to the 2011 elections. In May 2022, the party joined the Democratic Alliance Of Liberia, which aims to contest the 2023 elections.
