= 2011 Liberian general election =

- Presidential election
11 October 2011 (first round); 8 November 2011 (second round)
- Turnout: 71.64% (first round); 38.60% (second round)
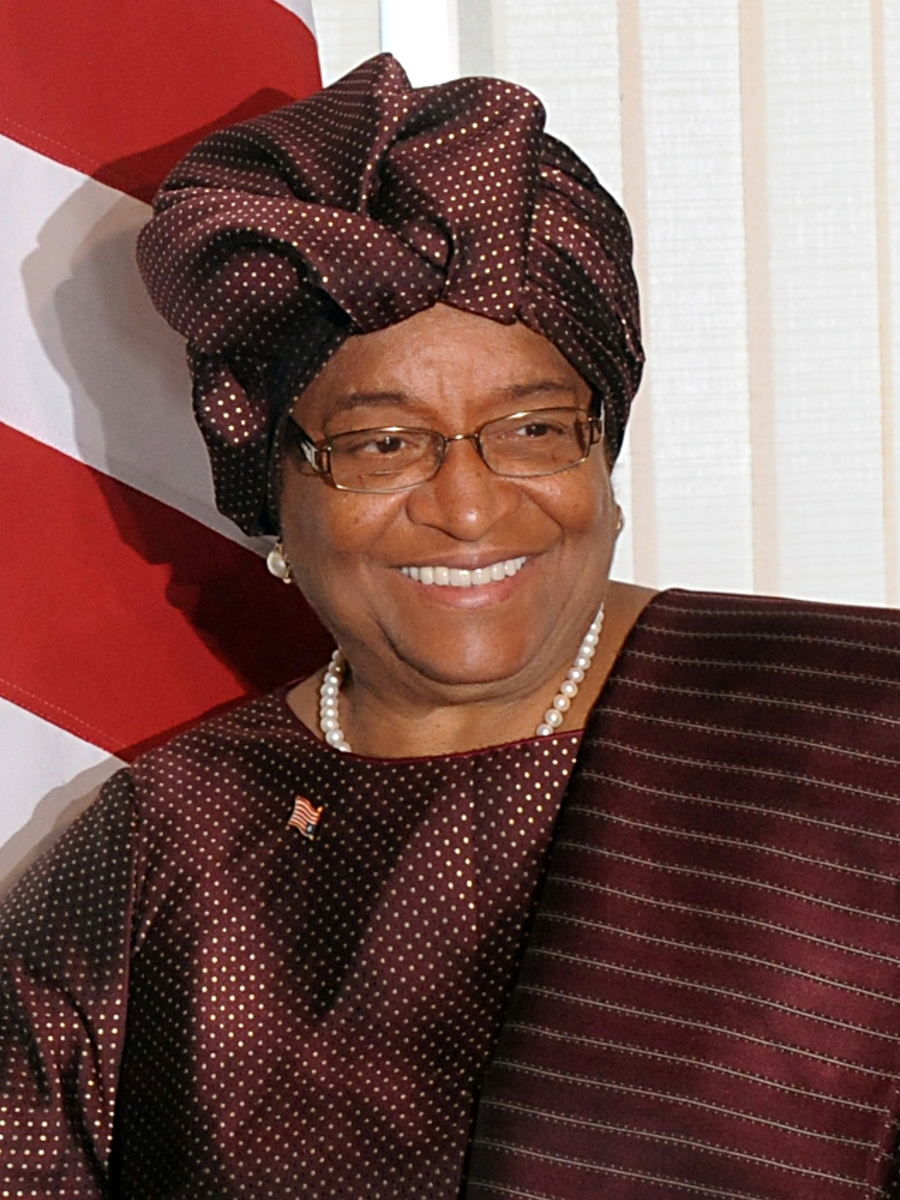

Nominee	Ellen Johnson Sirleaf	Winston Tubman
Party	UP	CDC
Running mate	Joseph Boakai	George Weah
Popular vote	607,618	62,207
Percentage	90.71%	9.29%
President before election
Ellen Johnson Sirleaf
UP
Elected President
Ellen Johnson Sirleaf
UP

General elections were held in Liberia on 11 October 2011, with a second round of the presidential election on 8 November. The presidency, as well as all seats in the House of Representatives and half of the seats in the Senate, were up for election. The election was overseen by the National Elections Commission (NEC).

The results of the legislative elections and first-round presidential election were released on 25 October 2011. In the legislative elections, the Unity Party maintained its plurality in both the House and the Senate, but as in the previous election, no party secured a majority in either chamber. Incumbent retention was low; only two of the fourteen incumbent senators seeking to retain their seats won reelection, while only twenty-five of the fifty-nine House incumbents running were reelected.

In the first round of the presidential election, incumbent President Ellen Johnson Sirleaf of the Unity Party led the presidential field with 43.9% of the vote, followed by Congress for Democratic Change candidate Winston Tubman with 32.7%. As no candidate received an absolute majority, Sirleaf and Tubman stood in a run-off election held on 8 November 2011. Tubman alleged that the first round had been rigged in Sirleaf's favor and called on his supporters to boycott the run-off. The Electoral Institute for Sustainable Democracy in Africa reported a turnout of 61% as compared to the 74.9% turnout in the first round. The NEC declared Sirleaf the winner of the run-off on 15 November 2011 with 90.7% of the vote.

== Accreditation ==
=== Candidates ===
Accreditation of candidates by the NEC was held from 20 July to 15 August 2011 at the Samuel Kanyon Doe Sports Complex in Paynesville. Candidates were required to submit a letter of intent, sworn declarations of citizenship and domicile, a tax clearance, financial disclosure forms and a valid form of identification.

Following the conclusion of the accreditation period, NEC Chairman James M. Fromayan noted that of the 2,700 registration forms delivered to political aspirants, only 920 had been returned. He said that no grace period would be allowed for late applicants.

=== Observers ===
The NEC accredited 799 international observers from 31 countries and international organizations to monitor the elections, including the African Union, European Union, the Economic Community of West African States (ECOWAS), Open Society Initiative for West Africa, National Democratic Institute, International Foundation for Electoral Systems, Search for Common Ground and personnel from the American, French, German, Spanish and Swedish embassies. A team from the Carter Center was led by former Nigerian President Yakubu Gowon. Additionally, 3,851 local observers from 68 national organizations and media outlets were accredited by the NEC to observe the elections.

== Presidential election ==
=== Nominations ===
In January 2010, incumbent President Ellen Johnson Sirleaf confirmed that she would run for a second term in office while speaking to a joint session of the Legislature. Sirleaf was renominated as the Unity Party's (UP) presidential candidate at the party's national convention on 31 October 2010. That same day, Vice President Joseph Boakai was nominated by Sirleaf and confirmed by the delegates to be the party's vice presidential candidate. The True Whig Party endorsed the Unity Party presidential ticket on 16 June 2011.

George Weah, who lost to Sirleaf in the 2005 runoff election, confirmed his intention to run for president in 2011. The third-place candidate from the 2005 elections, Liberty Party leader Charles Brumskine, also announced his plans to run for president. On 25 October 2010, the two candidates agreed following a meeting in Accra to create a coalition between the Liberty Party and Weah's Congress for Democratic Change (CDC), fielding a single list of candidates in the legislative elections. Additionally, Weah and Brumskine agreed to run against Sirleaf on a single ticket. However, this deal ultimately fell apart, and the Liberty Party announced in February 2011 that Senator Franklin Siakor had been chosen as Brumskine's running mate for the election.

On 1 May 2011, the CDC nominated Winston Tubman, the nephew of former President William Tubman and a Harvard-trained lawyer who finished fourth in the 2005 presidential election, as its candidate for president, with Weah as his running mate.

Prince Johnson, the former rebel leader of the Independent National Patriotic Front of Liberia during the First Liberian Civil War and a Senator from Nimba County, also announced his candidacy for the presidency, forming the National Union for Democratic Progress as his party. Johnson originally chose Grand Cape Mount County Senator Abel Massalay as his running mate, but fired him in January 2011. Johnson then chose Lavala Supuwood, a prominent attorney, as his vice presidential candidate. Massalay later endorsed Sirleaf's bid.

The New Deal Movement joined with the National Patriotic Party (NPP), the National Democratic Party of Liberia (NDPL), the Liberian People's Party, the United People's Party, the Liberia Equal Rights Party and the Labor Party of Liberia to form the National Democratic Coalition (NDC), which planned to nominate a single presidential ticket and a single list of legislative candidates. On 12 February 2011, New Deal nominated Dew Mayson, a former Liberian ambassador and university professor, as its standard bearer, and NDC had been expected to nominate Mayson as its presidential candidate. However, New Deal suspended Mayson as its standard bearer on 6 July 2011 following for unspecified reasons, only to later reinstate him in less than a week later. Mayson later told reporters that there was an internal debate within the NDC over whether to contest the presidential election or to solely field candidates for the legislative elections. The day prior to the NDC's convention, the NPP and the NDPL withdrew from the coalition, and on 17 July, the remaining members of the coalition nominated Mayson as their presidential candidate.

Following their withdrawal from the NDC, the NDPL announced on 2 August 2011 that it would support the Unity Party presidential ticket, while NPP voted on 3 August to support the CDC ticket.

Nathaniel Barnes, leader of the Liberian Destiny Party and Liberian Ambassador to the United Nations, originally announced his intention to challenge Sirleaf for the presidency in December 2010, but announced in July 2011 that his party had decided not to field a presidential candidate.

=== Candidates ===
Originally, NEC Chairman Fromayan stated that of the sixteen candidates who had filed for a presidential run, only 11 had listed a vice presidential nominee on their ticket, and that those candidates without running mates would be ineligible to run. However, the NEC published a list of provisional presidential candidates on 22 August 2011, listing all sixteen candidates, each with a running mate.

- Gladys Beyan – Grassroot Democratic Party of Liberia
- Charles Brumskine – Liberty Party
- Chea Cheapoo – Progressive People's Party
- James Chelley – Original Congress Party of Liberia
- Simeon Freeman – Movement for Progressive Change
- James Guseh – Citizens Unification Party
- Prince Yormie Johnson – National Union for Democratic Progress
- Ellen Johnson Sirleaf – Unity Party
- Marcus Roland Jones – Victory for Change Party
- Jonathan A. Mason – Union of Liberian Democrats
- Dew Mayson – National Democratic Coalition
- Manjerngie Ndebe – Liberia Reconstruction Party
- Kennedy Sandy – Liberia Transformation Party
- Togba-Nah Tipoteh – Freedom Alliance Party of Liberia
- Winston Tubman – Congress for Democratic Change
- Hananiah Zoe – Liberia Empowerment Party

=== Campaign ===
Sirleaf's campaign has highlighted the progress made in several areas since her inauguration, with Sirleaf using the Liberian English catchphrase "da my area" to emphasize her expertise in nation building. Sirleaf has emphasized her administration's work in relieving the country's debt, paying civil servants on time, rebuilding the Armed Forces of Liberia, improving basic services and infrastructure, and restoring Liberia's international standing.

Brumskine campaigned on a platform based on four pillars: reconciliation, reform, recovery and rebuilding. He stated that if elected, he would work to decentralize the government, as well as decrease the powers of what he called the "imperial presidency." He also proposed creating a national peace corp in which students would travel to different counties in order to promote development and reconciliation, as well as a "mobile clinic" where teams of doctors would travel from village to village. Brumskine criticized Sirleaf for her financial involvement in the First Liberian Civil War and for reneging on her pledge in 2005 to only serve one term. He further stated that if he lost the 2011 election, he would retire from politics to make way for what he called "a new and younger generation of Liberians."

Tubman stated that one of the most pressing issues facing the country was reconciling the Americo-Liberian minority and the indigenous majority, warning that a failure to do so would lead to another civil war. With regards to policy, Tubman noted that he would pursue many of the same policies as Sirleaf, but argued that his credentials made him a better choice to lead the nation. He also criticized Sirleaf for her past involvement in the country's civil conflict.

== Legislative election ==
As a result of the 2010 Threshold Bill, which revised the apportionment scheme used in the 2005 election, an additional nine seats were added to the House of Representatives. On the basis of the 2008 Census, Montserrado County gained three additional seats, Nimba County gained two seats, and Bong, Grand Bassa, Margibi and Lofa Counties each gained one seat. In all other counties, the electoral districts remained unchanged.

== Pre-election controversies ==
=== Alleged analysis ===
On 9 July, the Liberian newspaper FrontPageAfrica published a pre-election analysis allegedly commissioned by the Unity Party that discussed Sirleaf's expected vote tally in the first round of elections. The report, attributed to law professor Larry Gibson of the University of Maryland, projected Sirleaf to earn 37.7% of the vote in the first round and highlighted the importance of gaining the endorsement of Dew Mayson and Prince Johnson in the second round, as well as stating that Unity should maintain its "connections" at the NEC. Sirleaf's office denied that the analysis had been authorized by or submitted to Sirleaf, saying "The so-called email contains fabrications and lies, and attempts to create confusion in the minds of Liberians as they embark upon this year's democratic process." Gibson also denied authoring the analysis, noting that while he had assisted Sirleaf during her 2005 campaign, he had not worked for her or any other Liberian political campaign since then.

=== Voter fraud ===
The NEC announced on 9 August 2011 that it had discovered more than 10,000 people on its voter rolls who had registered more than once to vote in the elections. The NEC forwarded the names to the Ministry of Justice for prosecution for voter fraud. The Justice Ministry later confirmed that it was investigating the matter.

=== Pre-election violence ===
Senator Gloria Musu-Scott of the Unity Party claimed that her vehicle convoy had been attacked on 9 August 2011 while travelling to Monrovia from Maryland County, where she had been renominated as the Unity Party's candidate for the county's Senate seat. According to Scott and one of her drivers, she had changed vehicles when the one she was in had broken down. After she left the broken vehicle and its driver behind, five masked men approached the driver looking for her, searching the vehicle before leaving. Scott stated that she had reported the incident to the Justice Ministry for investigation.

On 15 August 2011, angry protestors attacked George Weah at his home, though he was unharmed. That same day, another group attacked Senator Geraldine Doe-Sheriff, National Chairman of the CDC, and other party officials at the CDC headquarters in Bentol. Doe-Sheriff and the officials were physically beaten and prevented from leaving the building, while a journalist covering the event was also attacked. The protestors were reportedly angered over alleged fraud in the CDC legislative primaries held the previous day.

Two men destroyed the car of UP party official Eugene Nagbe with a petrol bomb in the yard of his home in Margibi County on 17 August 2011. Nagbe, who had been Secretary-General of the CDC before leaving to become the Deputy Campaign Manager of Sirleaf's campaign in early 2011, was not harmed in the attack. The Justice Ministry later said that it had begun an investigation into the incident. Former House Speaker Edwin Snowe later claimed that Nagbe had previously received a threatening text message from a phone traced to the fiancée of George Weah's chief bodyguard, and that he had forwarded the text to the police. The Liberia National Police later arrested three suspects believed to be involved in the attack on Nagbe, as well as separate instances of armed robbery and gang rape.

On the same day as the attack on Nagbe, Assistant Information Minister for Culture Jacqueline Capehart was attacked while giving a speech promoting awareness of the constitutional referendum scheduled for 23 August. During her presentation, several youths began throwing stones at her before the police intervened and arrested them. Capehart was not injured during the attack, but a disc jockey participating in the event sustained injuries and was taken to the hospital. Numerous media outlets also reported that on the same day, former footballer Christopher Wreh was attacked following his endorsement of Sirleaf's presidential campaign. Several unidentified suspects were later arrested by the LNP in connection with the attack on Capehart.

President Sirleaf addressed the nation on 19 August, condemning the attacks against Doe-Sheriff and Nagbe as "politically motivated." Reiterating her call for peaceful elections, Sirleaf stated, "Violence against, and intimidation of, political actors and individuals undermine and destroy democracy. Such conduct is the beginning of anarchy, and if not deterred, such conduct could reverse the political gains we have made and probably cost our country to retrogress into another civil conflict." Sirleaf also ordered the country's security forces to investigate the attacks and prevent further violence.

=== Nobel Peace Prize ===
On 7 October 2011, four days prior to the election, Sirleaf was awarded the 2011 Nobel Peace Prize. Tubman denounced the award to Sirleaf, saying that "she brought war on our country and spoiled the country" and that the award was a "provocative intervention" in Liberian politics. Sirleaf herself called the timing a coincidence and avoided mentioning the award during the final days of campaigning.

== Amendment referendum ==
In September 2010, the NEC announced that a popular referendum to ratify four constitutional amendments passed by the Legislature in August 2010 would be held prior to the elections. If passed, three of the amendments would have directly affected the elections:

- The ten-year residency requirement for presidential candidates would have been reduced to five-year;
- Elections would have been held on the second Tuesday of November, delaying the 2011 elections until 8 November;
- The two-round system used for legislative elections would be replaced by a single-round first-past-the-post system, while the presidential election would have continued to use the two-round method.

The referendum was held on 23 August 2011, and the NEC announced on 31 August that all four amendments had been rejected. Following litigation, the Supreme Court ruled on 20 September that the NEC had improperly calculated the results, and that the amendment replacing the absolute majority requirement and run-off elections for non-presidential elections with a simple majority requirement had been ratified.

=== Legal challenge ===
On 14 September, presidential candidate Simeon Freeman of the Movement for Progressive Change filed a petition with the Supreme Court requesting that the Court disqualify the six presidential candidates of the Unity Party, Congress for Democratic Change, Liberty Party, National Democratic Coalition, National Union for Democratic Progress and Liberia Transformation Party. The petition argued that due to the failure of the referendum proposal to reduce the residency requirement from 10 to 5 years, these presidential candidates could not contest the election due to their residency outside the country during the Second Liberian Civil War. NEC Chairman James Fromayan said that the text of the residency clause was vague, in that it did not define the term "resident" or say whether a candidate had to reside in Liberia for the ten years immediately prior to the election. As such, Fromayan stated that the NEC had qualified the six candidates to run because "we don't want to penalize anybody on the grounds of a particular constitutional clause that lacks clarity."

Prior to a preliminary hearing on 20 September, the Supreme Court issued an injunction barring the six parties from campaigning pending the outcome of the litigation. However, the Court lifted the injunction on 20 September after the respondent parties argued that they had not yet been able to submit their responses to the MPC's claims. The Court denied the petitioners' motion on 5 October, ruling that as the residency requirement had been suspended prior to the 2005 elections, the requirement could not be applied until ten years after the suspension.

== Conduct ==
=== First round ===
==== Voting ====
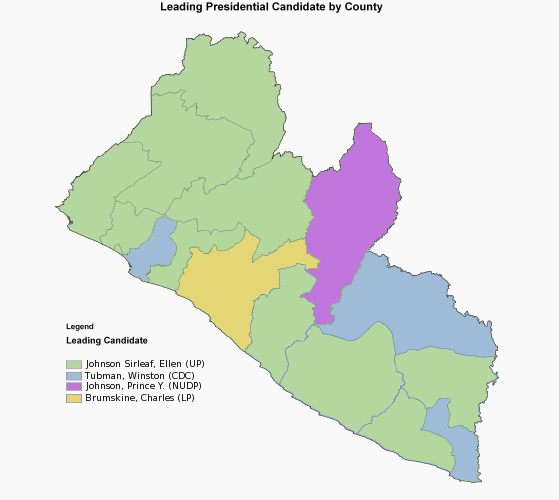
First round presidential map showing the winners of each county

Voting proceeded smoothly and peacefully, with no reports of violence. Heavy voter turnout was reported in most of the country. Severe rain in Montserrado County and some other parts of the country led to minor delays in the opening of some polling places, though most of the country was free from severe weather. President Sirleaf travelled to Feefee in her native Bomi County to cast her vote, while Tubman cast his vote at G. W. Gibson High School in Monrovia.

==== Reactions ====
The observer teams from the Carter Center, ECOWAS and the African Union all praised the first round of elections for their smoothness and peacefulness. Specioza Kazibwe, the head of the AU observer mission, termed the elections "phenomenal" and praised Liberians for turning out in high numbers despite heavy rain. The AU team also declared the elections to be "free, fair, transparent and credible" and urged all political parties to accept the outcomes of the elections. The ECOWAS observer mission also praised the vote, saying that "on the whole, the elections of 11 October 2011, were conducted under acceptable conditions of freedom of voters and transparency of the process." The Liberia-based Elections Coordinating Commission commended polling workers for their professionalism and for giving special priority to elderly, disabled and pregnant voters. The Carter Center noted some minor procedural irregularities, but it stated that none of the irregularities were significant enough to affect the outcome of the election and called the elections "peaceful, orderly, and remarkably transparent." United Nations Secretary-General Ban Ki-moon stated that the elections were an "important milestone" in the move to "consolidate peace and democracy in the country."

==== Opposition withdrawal ====
Preliminary results released by the NEC on 14 October 2011 showed, with 50.3% of polling places reporting, Sirleaf leading with 45.4% of the vote, with Tubman in second place with 29.5% and Prince Johnson in third with 11.4%. On 15 October, nine political parties announced that they were withdrawing from the elections and ordering their poll observers to withdraw from the monitoring process, including Tubman's Congress for Democratic Change, Johnson's National Union for Democratic Progress, the National Patriotic Party, National Democratic Coalition, Union of Liberia Democrats, Liberia Transformation Party, Victory for Change Party, Liberia Reconstruction Party, and Grassroot Democratic Party. In a statement, the nine parties claimed that the NEC was fraudulently altering the vote count to favor Sirleaf, saying that they planned to present their evidence of fraud through the media and would not respect the outcome of the elections. They claimed that they could offer witnesses and photographs to back up their claims of fraud. On the same day, a local office of the Unity Party in Monrovia was set ablaze, with UNMIL and the Liberia National Police investigating the incident.

NEC Chairman Fromayan rejected the opposition's charges, stating, "All the parties participated in the elections. The counting was done and both the local population and the international observers that came acclaimed the process to be free, fair and transparent." A spokesman for the Unity Party accused the opposition of trying to create chaos in the country, saying "They are doing this thing because it is not going their way." The Carter Center stated that it stood by its original description of the election as free and transparent. In reaction to the withdrawal, Luis Moreno-Ocampo, lead prosecutor of the International Criminal Court, said that the prosecutor's office was closely monitoring the events and warned that any use of violence by the parties and candidates would not be tolerated.

On 16 October, the NEC released additional results based on 96.7% of polling places reporting that had Sirleaf still leading with 44% of the vote, Tubman increasing his second place total to 32.2% of the vote and Prince Johnson with 11.8%. The nine opposition parties called for a recount of the votes, as well as for the NEC to release the total number of votes in each county and district. However, Tubman said that based on the updated results, he would be willing to participate in the likely run-off election between Sirleaf and himself, backing off from his previous statements.

=== Second round ===
==== Endorsements ====
On 18 October, Prince Johnson announced that he was endorsing Sirleaf in the second-round, saying, "This is because some of her policies are good for this country. If all her policies are not good, we will do addition and subtraction so that what we want to see in it will be reflected." He termed his choice of Sirleaf "the lesser of two evils" and added that he refused to support Tubman because of the CDC's stated aim of implementing the TRC report that recommended prosecution of Johnson for war crimes. Former President Moses Blah endorsed Sirleaf on 24 October, praising her administration's development projects in his native Nimba County. Seventh-place finisher Togba-Nah Tipoteh of the Freedom Alliance Party of Liberia also endorsed Sirleaf for the second round on 27 October, citing her administration for the level of transparency it had brought to the political process. Charles Brumskine, who came in fourth in the first round, endorsed Sirleaf on 31 October, saying: "[O]ur task as we see it is one of judging capacity and potential and making good faith effort to help move our country forward." Sirleaf also received the endorsement of Gladys Beyan, the sixth-place finisher in the presidential election for the Grassroot Democratic Party of Liberia.

==== CDC boycott ====
Ten opposition parties, including the nine parties that briefly withdrew from the elections, met with Ellen Margrethe Løj, Special Representative of the United Nations Secretary General to UNMIL, on 17 October, asking the UN to manage the run-off elections in place of the NEC. ECOWAS announced that same day that it would be sending a larger contingent of observers for the run-off election, but also chastised the opposition parties for their actions after the first-round elections and urged them to use "constitutional means" to redress their grievances.

On 26 October, Tubman stated that unless the leadership of the NEC was replaced, the CDC would boycott the run-off election. Tubman said that his party had lost confidence in the impartiality of the NEC due to the CDC's allegations of vote-tampering and its feeling that the NEC had not sufficiently addressed its concerns. Acarous Gray, the Secretary-General of the CDC, specified on 27 October that unless the government dismissed NEC Chairman Fromayan, it would not participate in the second round. This threat came in the wake of an official letter received by the CDC from the NEC informing the CDC that it had placed first in the first-round presidential election with 43.9% of the vote against UP's 32.7%. The CDC cited this letter as evidence of fraud on the part of the NEC to favor UP. The NEC acknowledged the letter, but said that the incorrect voting figures had been a typographical error. The NEC fired the head of its communication department on 28 October as a result of the error.

Fromayan resigned as NEC Chairman on 30 October, saying: "I am resigning to give way to peace. I do not want to be the obstacle to the holding of the run-off election." His deputy chairperson, Elizabeth J. Nelson, assumed his role at the NEC that same day. Sirleaf's press secretary said that Sirleaf had accepted Fromayan's resignation, adding, "The president also thanked him for his service to the people of Liberia." Tubman welcomed the news, stating, "It is a victory for the CDC, a victory for democracy and a victory for the Liberian people." However, CDC Secretary-General Acarous Gray stated on 31 October that while Fromayan's resignation was a step forward, the CDC would not participate in the run-off election unless the NEC recounted the votes of the first round and sufficiently investigated its claims of ballot tampering. Tubman responded that same day that he, and not Gray, was empowered to make the decision over whether or not to participate in the run-off election, and that he had not yet made a decision. The Deputy Information Minister for Public Affairs, Jerelimic Piah, said that the government viewed the contradictory statements from Tubman and the CDC leadership as evidence that Tubman was not in control of his party and urged Tubman to assert his leadership over the CDC to curtail "provocative comments" being made by CDC officials.

On 4 November, Tubman stated that he would boycott the second round, saying, "We will never reward fraud and abuse of power and will never grant legitimacy to a corrupt political process." Tubman added that "any government coming out of the 8 November process will be done without a national mandate to govern and will not be recognised by the CDC." The NEC said that under the terms of the country's constitution and elections law, the second round would proceed regardless of the CDC's boycott and urged voters to turn out.

Reactions

Sirleaf urged voters to attend the polls and vote for the candidate of their choice in a national radio address on 5 November, arguing that "Tubman...has called on Liberians to give up their franchise, their right to vote" and that "what he is doing is forfeiting the right to the finals because he fears defeat." ECOWAS stated that it was disappointed in Tubman's "retrogressive tone" and reiterated its call for the CDC to participate in the run-off, adding that it would recognize any winner it judged to have been elected in a free and fair election regardless of the boycott. The head of the AU observer mission, Speciosa Kazibwe, said, "We are very concerned. It's a bad signal ... political leaders must be prepared to win or lose." A spokeswoman for the US State Department also expressed disappointment in Tubman's decision, as she noted that "the CDC's charge that the first-round election was fraudulent is unsubstantiated." The spokesman also warned against any attempts at violence by CDC partisans.

==== Violence ====
Clashes between the Liberia National Police (LNP) and CDC protestors left at least two people dead and several wounded outside of the CDC headquarters in Sinkor on 7 November 2011. The CDC had bussed in hundreds of CDC partisans to participate in a protest against the holding of the second-round election. The protestors said they had planned to march through Monrovia to the UNMIL headquarters and the United States Embassy to present a petition protesting the second-round elections. When the LNP blocked off access to Tubman Boulevard, the crowd began throwing stones at the officers and attempting to break through the police line, leading to tear gas being deployed and shooting which killed at least one person.

A spokesman for the LNP initially claimed that the officers had not deployed live rounds against the protestors, limiting themselves to tear gas in order "to disperse the crowd so that people who were not part of the demonstration could move about freely." Tubman and Weah cited the incident as evidence that the run-off should not take place. The LNP later admitted that one police officer had fired into the crowd, and that the officer had been detained by UNMIL. Justice Minister Christiana Tah said that security would be increased during the election and that an investigation would be conducted into the incident. While initial reports from the scene claimed that at least four people had been killed, officials later said that only two people had died. On 11 November, President Sirleaf announced the formation of an independent commission to investigate the shooting and vowed that any person who had broken the law would be brought to justice. On the commission's recommendation, Sirleaf dismissed LNP Inspector General Marc Amblard, who accepted responsibility for the incident.

==== Closure of media outlets ====
Following the riot on 7 November, the government shut down four radio stations and three television stations, all of which were reported to be pro-CDC outlets. The government said that the closures had been legal, with a writ ordering the closures issued by the First Judicial Circuit Criminal Court in Monrovia. The government's petition to the Court argued that the stations had "illegally used their respective media outlets by broadcasting hate messages against the government and deliberately spreading misinformation and messages of violence, and instigating the people to rise up and take to the streets and engage in confrontation with the Liberia National Police and the United Nations security forces." Sirleaf later said that the closures had been conducted "with the aim to prevent the incitement of further violence and protect lives." The closures were condemned by the Press Union of Liberia, the Liberia Media Center, the Center for Media Studies and Peace Building, Reporters Without Borders, the Committee to Protect Journalists, and the Liberty Party. The First Judicial Circuit Criminal Court ordered the reopening of the stations on 15 November.

==== Voting ====
Turnout on the day of the run-off was low, with some polling stations closing early upon realizing that no more voters would show up. Nevertheless, international observers from ECOWAS and the Carter Center commended the election, with the Carter Center saying, "Liberia's run-off election was conducted in general accordance with the country's legal framework and international obligations, which provide for genuine democratic elections. While the run-off was undermined by the CDC boycott, the eruption of electoral violence, and low voter turnout, it allowed Liberians who wished to participate to express their will in a transparent and credible process."

==== Reactions ====
Tubman initially expressed his interest in reconciling with the government, saying on 11 November that "since Mrs. Sirleaf will now claim she is the president and is recognized by the international community, we have to find a way to work with her and I believe it is not beyond our ability to find a way for that to happen." However, he reversed his position the next day, terming the Unity Party "election hijackers" and calling for new elections and further protest by CDC supporters. The government rejected Tubman's demand for new elections.

On 11 November, Sirleaf announced that she would establish a "national peace and reconciliation initiative" to address the country's divisions and begin "a national dialogue that would bring us together." Nobel Peace Prize laureate Leymah Gbowee was chosen by Sirleaf to lead to initiative.

== Results ==
=== President ===
Candidate	Running mate	Party	First round		Second round	
Candidate	Running mate	Party	Votes	%	Votes	%
Ellen Johnson Sirleaf	Joseph Boakai	Unity Party	530,020	43.93	607,618	90.71
Winston Tubman	George Weah	Congress for Democratic Change	394,370	32.68	62,207	9.29
Prince Yormie Johnson	James Laveli Supuwood	National Union for Democratic Progress	139,786	11.58		
Charles Brumskine	Franklin Siakor	Liberty Party	65,800	5.45		
Kennedy Gbleyah Sandy	Alloycious Dennis Wolloh	Liberia Transformation Party	13,612	1.13		
Gladys G. Y. Beyan	Edward G Deshield	Grassroot Democratic Party of Liberia	12,740	1.06		
Togba-Nah Tipoteh	J. Rudolph Marsh	Freedom Alliance Party of Liberia	7,659	0.63		
Dew Tuan-Wleh Mayson	Dusty Wolokolie	National Democratic Coalition	5,819	0.48		
Manjerngie Cecelia Ndebe	Zizi Kolubah Zubah	Liberia Reconstruction Party	5,746	0.48		
Simeon Freeman	Cyrus Cromah	Movement for Progressive Change	5,559	0.46		
Marcus Roland Jones	Monica Dokie Borbor	Victory for Change Party	5,305	0.44		
James Sawalla Guseh	George A. Lawrence	Citizens Unification Party	5,025	0.42		
Hananiah Zoe	Richard K. Flomo	Liberia Empowerment Party	4,463	0.37		
Chea Cheapoo	Jeremiah Tarway	Progressive People's Party	4,085	0.34		
James Kpa Chelley	Jerry Kollie Woah-Tee	Original Congress Party of Liberia	4,008	0.33		
Jonathan A. Mason	Jemeon Alphonso Sando	Union of Liberian Democrats	2,645	0.22		
Total			1,206,642	100.00	669,825	100.00
Valid votes			1,206,642	93.63	669,825	96.46
Invalid/blank votes			82,074	6.37	24,587	3.54
Total votes			1,288,716	100.00	694,412	100.00
Registered voters/turnout			1,798,930	71.64	1,798,930	38.60

=== House of Representatives ===
Party	Votes	%	Seats	+/–
Unity Party	226,291	19.02	24	+16
Congress for Democratic Change	163,592	13.75	11	–4
Liberty Party	117,285	9.86	7	–2
National Democratic Coalition	70,580	5.93	5	2
Liberia Transformation Party	57,734	4.85	1	New
National Union for Democratic Progress	50,010	4.20	6	New
National Patriotic Party	42,420	3.56	3	–1
Movement for Progressive Change	30,205	2.54	2	New
Alliance for Peace and Democracy	26,537	2.23	3	–2
National Democratic Party	19,446	1.63	0	–1
Original Congress Party of Liberia	17,613	1.48	0	New
Union of Liberian Democrats	15,199	1.28	0	0
Liberia Destiny Party	13,310	1.12	1	+1
National Reformation Party	9,813	0.82	1	0
Victory for Change Party	10,744	0.90	0	New
Progressive Democratic Party	9,718	0.82	0	0
Liberia Empowerment Party	9,174	0.77	0	New
Citizens Unification Party	8,946	0.75	0	New
Grassroot Democratic Party	8,776	0.74	0	New
Liberia Reconstruction Party	8,641	0.73	0	New
All Liberia Coalition Party	8,278	0.70	0	–2
Freedom Alliance Party	7,077	0.59	0	0
Liberia National Union	5,347	0.45	0	New
Progressive People's Party	1,015	0.09	0	New
Republican Party of Liberia	991	0.08	0	New
National Social Democratic Party of Liberia	850	0.07	0	New
Independents	250,412	21.04	9	+2
Total	1,190,004	100.00	73	+9
Valid votes	1,190,004	93.39		
Invalid/blank votes	84,182	6.61		
Total votes	1,274,186	100.00		
Registered voters/turnout	1,798,930	70.83		

=== Senate ===
Party	Votes	%	Seats			
Party	Votes	%	Not up	Won	Total	+/–
Congress for Democratic Change	259,161	21.67	1	2	3	+1
Unity Party	164,851	13.78	6	4	10	–1
Liberty Party	134,357	11.23	1	0	1	–1
National Patriotic Party	70,260	5.87	2	4	6	+3
National Union for Democratic Progress	51,494	4.30	1	1	2	+1
Liberia Transformation Party	48,180	4.03	0	0	0	0
National Democratic Coalition	41,717	3.49	0	1	1	+1
Alliance for Peace and Democracy	29,777	2.49	1	1	2	–1
Liberia Destiny Party	19,993	1.67	0	1	1	0
Movement for Progressive Change	18,098	1.51	0	0	0	0
Union of Liberian Democrats	9,834	0.82	0	0	0	–2
All Liberia Coalition Party	9,745	0.81	0	0	0	–1
Victory for Change Party	6,956	0.58	0	0	0	0
Grassroot Democratic Party	4,515	0.38	0	0	0	0
Liberia National Union	3,756	0.31	0	0	0	0
Freedom Alliance Party of Liberia	2,697	0.23	0	0	0	0
National Democratic Party	2,440	0.20	1	0	1	0
National Reformation Party	714	0.06	0	0	0	0
Original Congress Party	403	0.03	0	0	0	0
Independents	317,265	26.52	2	1	3	0
Total	1,196,213	100.00	15	15	30	0
Valid votes	1,196,213	93.23				
Invalid/blank votes	86,874	6.77				
Total votes	1,283,087	100.00				
Registered voters/turnout	1,798,930	71.33				

==== Results by county ====
The following are the results for the 2011 Senate elections from the National Elections Commission.

2011 Bomi County Senatorial election
Party	Candidate	Votes	%
NPP	Sando Dazoe Johnson	10,996	32.98%
UP	Richard B. Devine	7,497	22.49%
Independent	Neh Dukuly Tolbert	7,331	21.99%
Independent	Hawah Goll Kotchi	2,787	8.36%
ALCOP	Duannah A. Kamara	2,195	6.58%
LP	Varney Arthur Yengbeh Jr.	1,370	4.11%
NDC	James Joway McGill	623	1.87%
MPC	H. Vanjah Gaie	541	1.62%
Total votes		33,340	100.0
Rejected ballots		2,295	

2011 Bong County Senatorial election
Party	Candidate	Votes	%
NDC	Henry Willie Yallah	29,804	26.24%
UP	Ranney Banama Jackson	29,023	25.56%
LP	Augustus Jonathan Flomo	24,116	21.24%
MPC	Benedict K. Sagbeh	16,036	14.12%
CDC	J. Mike Kollie	10,076	8.87%
VCP	P. Sulon Dolo	4,507	3.97%
Total votes		113,562	100.0
Rejected ballots		10,194	

2011 Gbarpolu County Senatorial election
Party	Candidate	Votes	%
NPP	Armah Zolu Jallah	15,263	61.77%
UP	Daniel Naatehn	6,450	26.1%
LP	A. Kanie Wesso	2,414	9.77%
NUDP	Joseph Jarleakai Taweh	584	2.36%
Total votes		24,711	100.0
Rejected ballots		1,485	

2011 Grand Bassa County Senatorial election
Party	Candidate	Votes	%
NPP	John Francis Whitfield Jr.	23,490	31.38%
Independent	Daniel Lymus Chea	23,072	30.82%
LP	Nathaniel K. Innis Sr.	13,501	18.03%
UP	Gboba Bennie Johnson	11,048	14.76%
LINU	Martha Flanjay Karnga	3,756	5.02%
Total votes		74,867	100.0
Rejected ballots		6,127	

2011 Grand Cape Mount County Senatorial election
Party	Candidate	Votes	%
UP	Edward Boakai Dagoseh	12,031	32.4%
Independent	Fodee Kromah	9,173	24.71%
LP	Matthew V. Z. Darblo Sr.	5,001	13.47%
NPP	James Kormah Momo	4,121	11.1%
Independent	Joanna Mamusu Hill	3,098	8.34%
APD	Sando S. Wayne	1,195	3.22%
FAPL	Samuel Lami Kamara	959	2.58%
VCP	A. Kundukai Jaleiba Sr.	835	2.25%
NRP	Moibah E. Nyemay Sherif	714	1.92%
Total votes		37,127	100.0
Rejected ballots		2,941	

2011 Grand Gedeh County Senatorial election
Party	Candidate	Votes	%
UP	Alphonso G. Gaye	10,499	35.19%
LTP	A. Marshall Dennis	8,637	28.95%
LP	Thomas Nimely	6,526	21.87%
NDPL	George Sluwar Dweh Jr.	2,078	6.96%
NDC	Cyrus S. Cooper II	1,283	4.3%
ULD	William Cheyety Sandy	812	2.72%
Total votes		29,835	100.0
Rejected ballots		1,612	

2011 Grand Kru County Senatorial election
Party	Candidate	Votes	%
CDC	Peter Sonpon Coleman	6,250	33.84%
APD	Blamoh Nelson	5,392	29.19%
UP	Rosalind Tonne Sneh	3,526	19.09%
NDC	Victor E. Dweh Kaydor Sr.	2,686	14.54%
NDPL	Stephen Gbeh Kofa Sr.	362	1.96%
LP	C. Pupo Toe	253	1.37%
Total votes		18,469	100.0
Rejected ballots		1,186	

2011 Lofa County Senatorial election
Party	Candidate	Votes	%
UP	George Tamba Tengbeh	21,914	23.98%
LP	Stephen Jorgbor H. Zargo	13,536	14.81%
Independent	Stanley S. Kparkillen	13,391	14.65%
APD	Joseph Kpator Jallah	12,420	13.59%
ALCOP	Fomba Khalifa Kanneh	7,550	8.26%
CDC	A. Varfee Tulay	5,307	5.81%
NPP	John P. Namayan	4,658	5.1%
GDPL	Kollie Massayan Sorsor Sr.	4,515	4.94%
LDP	Kabaworsinah B. K. Sando	4,387	4.8%
LTP	Jekeh Forkpa Koiyan	3,723	4.07%
Total votes		91,401	100.0
Rejected ballots		8,970	

2011 Margibi County Senatorial election
Party	Candidate	Votes	%
UP	Oscar A. Cooper	36,138	45.3%
Independent	Ansu Dao Sonii	18,715	23.46%
ULD	Roland C. Kaine	9,022	11.31%
Independent	John F. Josiah	6,871	8.61%
LP	Blama Fofie Nyei	4,407	5.52%
FAPL	Abraham Gayeyouwei Smith Sr.	1,738	2.18%
VCP	Alexander Konkai Freeman	1,614	2.02%
NUDP	S. Bedell Fahn Sr.	1,273	1.6%
Total votes		79,778	100.0
Rejected ballots		5,993	

2011 Maryland County Senatorial election
Party	Candidate	Votes	%
NPP	H. Dan Morais	10,305	35.48%
UP	Gloria M. Musu-Scott	6,135	21.12%
Independent	James Norman Anderson	5,544	19.09%
LDP	Mason Chumud Goe	4,273	14.71%
LTP	Thomas Bannie Browne Jr.	1,349	4.64%
NUDP	Abraham Botimo Jackson	726	2.5%
MPC	Anthony S. W. Bedell	714	2.46%
Total votes		29,046	100.0
Rejected ballots		2,656	

2011 Montserrado County Senatorial election
Party	Candidate	Votes	%
CDC	Geraldine M. Doe-Sherif	233,038	52.68%
Independent	Lewis Garseedah Brown II	129,255	29.22%
LP	Losene F. Bility	51,611	11.67%
LTP	James N. Jensen	28,458	6.43%
Total votes		442,362	100.0
Rejected ballots		28,034	

2011 Nimba County Senatorial election
Party	Candidate	Votes	%
NUDP	Thomas Semandahn Grupee	48,911	29.97%
Independent	Edith Lianue Gongloe-Weh	42,061	25.77%
Independent	Yamie QuiQui Gbeisay Sr.	22,781	13.96%
Independent	John Guntor Troseh	17,228	10.56%
UP	Saye-Taayor Adolphus Dolo	13,617	8.34%
Independent	George Saye-Senlesei Wuo	10,034	6.15%
LTP	Esther Lama Myers	4,010	2.46%
LP	Cecelia Siaway Teah	3,004	1.84%
NDC	Nyah K. V. Vehyee	1,574	0.96%
Total votes		163,220	100.0
Rejected ballots		11,233	

2011 Rivercess County Senatorial election
Party	Candidate	Votes	%
LDP	Dallas Advertus V. Gueh	6,604	37.81%
CDC	Byron W. Zahnwea	4,490	25.7%
UP	George Dee Moore	2,687	15.38%
LP	Emmanuel S. Toe	1,439	8.24%
NPP	Victor Missiongar Wilson	1,427	8.17%
LTP	Benjones Dugbaye Wheagbah Sr.	821	4.7%
Total votes		17,468	100.0
Rejected ballots		1,634	

2011 River Gee County Senatorial election
Party	Candidate	Votes	%
Independent	Matthew N. Jaye	5,924	33.28%
UP	Jonathan Sogbie	4,286	24.08%
LDP	J. Nathaniel Williams	3,892	21.86%
LP	John Charles Kwiah	1,308	7.35%
LTP	Michael A. Cooper	1,182	6.64%
MPC	Jeremiah Barlay Pawoo	807	4.53%
OCPOL	Karsloh S. Turo	403	2.26%
Total votes		17,802	100.0
Rejected ballots		1,118	

2011 Sinoe County Senatorial election
Party	Candidate	Votes	%
APD	Joseph Nyenetue Nagbe	10,770	46.37%
LP	Thomas Romeo Quioh	5,871	25.28%
NDC	Nathaniel Sniweah Bartee	5,747	24.74%
LDP	Myrtle Francelle Gibson	837	3.6%
Total votes		23,225	100.0
Rejected ballots		1,396	

== Aftermath ==
Representative Nelson Wah Barh, who had been re-elected as the House representative for Sinoe County District 3, died on 17 October shortly before a party intended to celebrate his re-election. The NEC announced that it would hold a by-election to fill Barh's seat, but noted that the election could not be held until the 53rd Legislature had convened in January and officially informed the NEC of the vacancy.
