= Reformed United Liberia Party =

Political party in Liberia

The Reformed United Liberia Party (RULP) is a political party in Liberia. It fielded candidates in the 11 October 2005 elections.

RULP candidate William V.S. Tubman, Jr. won 1.6% of the vote in the presidential poll. The party failed to win any seats in the Senate or House of Representatives.

The party was disqualified from contesting the 2011 presidential and legislative elections.
