= Togba-Nah Tipoteh =

Liberian politician

Togba-Nah Tipoteh (born 1941) is an economist, educator and politician, having been a presidential candidate in three elections. For more than three decades, he has been actively involved with democratic activities in promotion of human rights, liberties, constitutional rule and growth with development in Liberia and throughout Africa. He is President of the Movement for Justice in Africa (MOJA); was founding Chairman of the Collaborating Political Parties (CPP), an alliance of Liberian political parties; was founder and Director-General of Susukuu Incorporated (1971- ), Liberia's oldest non-governmental development organization, which was credited by the West Africa Peacekeeping Force (ECOMOG) as helping to disarm over 10,000 combatants and child soldiers in Liberia during the 1997 disarmament program through a school for gun program; and was former chairman of the Interest Groups of Liberia, a consortium of 32 national organizations with a collective membership of well over one million persons.

== Early life ==
Togba-Nah Tipoteh was born in Monrovia in 1941 to Reverend and Mrs Samuel Togba Roberts of Grand Kru County. He was educated at the College of West Africa (high school) and at the University of Liberia. He earned bachelor's and master's degrees in economics from Ohio University (Athens) and Ohio State University in Columbus, US, in June 1963 and 1964 respectively. In 1969, he earned a doctorate degree in economics while studying as a Harvard University/United Nations Special Fund Fellow in Economic Development at the University of Nebraska–Lincoln. In the early 1970s, Tipoteh was associate professor of economics, chair of the Economics Department and director of the Management Research Institute at the University of Liberia (1971-1974). He was Liberia's national tennis champion for 30 unbroken years (1964-1994)

== Political career ==
In 1973, Tipoteh founded the Movement for Justice in Africa (MOJA), a leftist pan-African political organization which played a pivotal role in the struggle for social justice and democracy in Liberia in the 1970s. He served as a budget advisor to Liberian president William R. Tolbert, in which position he expressed concerns about government waste and advocated public management reforms.

He was the first minister of planning and economic affairs (1980-1981) under the regime of Samuel K. Doe which overthrew President Tolbert, but resigned after 15 months in office, citing human rights abuses by the government as his reason for leaving.

In 1983 the Liberian People's Party (LPP) was formed as the electoral wing of MOJA. In Liberia's 1997 elections Tipoteh ran as the presidential candidate of the LPP, winning 1.61% of the vote. In Liberia's 2005 elections, Tipoteh was the candidate for the Alliance for Peace and Democracy, an alliance of the LPP and another veteran opposition movement, the United People's Party (UPP), winning 2.3%.

In Liberia's 2011 elections, he was the candidate of the Freedom Alliance Party of Liberia (FAPL). After being knocked out in the first round, he endorsed Ellen Johnson Sirleaf for the second round, saying in a statement that his party's decision followed observation and evaluation of the two parties in the run-off, based on the issue of societal transparency.

Tipoteh is also a businessman, and serves as chairman of the board and chief executive officer of Kukatornon Reconstruction Corporation. Through his scholarship program, he mentors and sends hundreds of students (mainly children) from all counties of Liberia to schools and colleges in Liberia. He married the former Ms. Fatu Kanneh of Lofa County and they have an adopted son, a former child soldier from war lord Charles Taylor's NPFL. To his admirers he is known as "the only man on the ground" - the only presidential candidate to remain in Liberia after the 1997 election victory of Taylor. Tipoteh, wearing an Obama T-shirt the last weekend of the US presidential election, endorsed Barack Obama of the Democratic Party, predicting that Obama would win the election.

He has worked in international development in the United States, the Netherlands, Mozambique, Ghana, South Africa and other countries, as well as for the United Nations system: Food and Agriculture Organization (FAO), United Nations Conference on Trade and Development (UNCTAD), International Monetary Fund (IMF), African Economic Community (ECA) and the International Bank for Reconstruction and Development (IBRD), among others.

== Education ==
- University of Liberia
- Ohio University (bachelor's degree)
- Ohio State University (master's degree)
- University of Nebraska–Lincoln (Ph.D. in economics)
- Harvard University-United Nations Special Fund Fellow

== Publications ==
- Democracy: The Call of the Liberian People (1981)
- More than 600 articles on economic growth and development
- Bite and Blow
- Pepperbird Bound for Freedom

== Awards ==
- Award for courage by the National Internally Displaced People Association (NIDPA),
- Award for Justice by a Liberian Civil society organization with membership from nine displaced camps,
- Democracy and Peace: The Golden Image Award of Liberia,
- Member of Omicron Delta Epsilon, Economics Honor Society of the United States of America,
- Inaugural Lecturer of the African Academy of Sciences Lecture Series,
- Inducted into the Order of African Redemption with the Rank of Grand Band,
- Man of the Year, as selected by media entities,
- Politician of the Year, as selected by media entities,
- Honored as Undefeated Retired Tennis Champion of Liberia for thirty consecutive years (1964-1994)
