= George Kiadii =

Liberian politician

Rev. George Momodu Kiadii is a Liberian politician and Christian Minister. He ran for President of Liberia in 2005 as a member of the National Vision Party of Liberia (NATVIPOL).

== Career ==
Kiadii was at various times both a leader in the anti-Charles Taylor expatriate movement in the United States and Taylor's Ambassador at-large in charge of wooing investors to the country.

Running as the NATVIPOL presidential candidate in the 11 October 2005 elections, Kiadii placed 20th out of 22 candidates, receiving 0.4% of the vote.
