= Roland Massaquoi =

Liberian politician

Roland Chris Yarkpah Massaquoi is a Liberian politician and, as of 2006, leader of the National Patriotic Party (NPP). In 2009, Massaquoi was the President of the Liberian Produce Marketing Corporation.

Running as the NPP presidential candidate in the 11 October 2005 elections, Massaquoi placed sixth out of 22 candidates, receiving 4.1% of the vote. He is a member of the Loma ethnic group.

Massaquoi was agriculture minister and planning minister under the administration of Charles Taylor.
