= Winston Tubman =

Liberian diplomat and politician

Winston A. Tubman (born 1941) is a Liberian diplomat and politician of Americo-Liberian and Grebo descent. He is a former justice minister and diplomat for the nation, as well as having been the standard bearer of the Congress for Democratic Change (CDC).

== Biography ==
Born in the Maryland County town of Pleebo, Tubman is the nephew of William V. S. Tubman, Liberia's longest serving president. He has degrees from the London School of Economics, Cambridge University and Harvard University.

A member of the bar, he founded his own law firm in 1968 and served as legal adviser to the Ministry of Planning and Economic Affairs during his uncle's administration. Tubman has extensive United Nations experience. His first job was in the Legal Office in 1973. He served under Samuel Doe as Justice Minister from 1982 to 1983, and he has served as the Permanent Representative of Liberia to the United Nations for the period 1979–81. Tubman traveled to the United States in 1990 on behalf of Doe to lobby (ultimately unsuccessfully) the American government to intervene in the First Liberian Civil War. He more recently served as the Secretary-General's representative and head of the United Nations Political Office for Somalia from 2002 to 2005.

Tubman was the National Democratic Party of Liberia's (NDPL) presidential candidate in the 11 October 2005 election. He was defeated in the first round, placing fourth with 9.2% of the vote.

On May 1, 2011, the CDC chose Tubman as its presidential candidate for the 2011 election, with George Weah, the second-place candidate in the 2005 election, as his running mate.
