= George Klay Kieh =

Liberian educator and independent politician

George Klay Kieh Jr. (born 2 March 1956) is a Liberian educator and independent politician, and an avid admirer of former U.S. President Jimmy Carter.

== Early life ==
Kieh was born in Harbel, Firestone on March 2, 1956. He attended the University of Liberia where he was granted a Bachelor of Arts degree in political science. Kieh continued his education in the United States at Northwestern University in Illinois where he earned a master's degree and Ph.D. in political science.

== Political career ==
Running as the NDM presidential candidate in the 11 October 2005 elections alongside Alaric Tokpa and placed 17th out of 22 candidates, receiving 0.5% of the vote.

Kieh worked at Grand Valley State University in Allendale, Michigan as a professor of Political Science, following his unsuccessful bid for President of Liberia. Previous to this, he taught at Morehouse College in Atlanta, Georgia, for many years. He served as the Dean of the Political Science Department prior to his unsuccessful bid for president in Liberia. Upon returning to GVSU, he specialized in developing countries, conflict, and African Politics. He has just been named Dean of Arts and Sciences at the University of West Georgia in Carrollton, Georgia, to begin July 1, 2009. He succeeds Interim Dean Dr. Don Rice, who succeeded Dean Dr. David White, who succeeded Interim Dean Dr. Pauline Gagnon, who succeeded Dean Dr. Richard Miller.
