= Robert Kpoto =

Liberian politician

Robert Momo Kpoto is a Liberian orthopedic surgeon, politician, and member of the Union of Liberian Democrats (ULD).

Running as the ULD presidential candidate in the 11 October 2005 elections, Kpoto placed 19th out of 22 candidates, receiving 0.4% of the vote.

In 1990 during Liberia's civil war, Kpoto was Liberia's chief medical officer and told a reporter that he was concerned about the threat of typhoid and cholera. He worked 12-hour days operating on people with gunshot wounds or throats that had been cut.

In 2009, Kpoto was flown to Ghana for treatment after he and some other people were involved in an automobile accident that claimed at least one life.
