= Matthew Flomo =

Liberian politician

Matthew Flomo is a Liberian politician. As of June 2014, he is the Acting Minister of Health and Social Welfare, and the Deputy Minister for Administration.
