= William V. S. Tubman Jr. =

Liberian politician

William Vacanarat Shadrach Tubman Jr. was a Liberian politician and member of the Reformed United Liberia Party (RULP). He is the son of William Tubman, who was President of Liberia from 1943 to 1971, and the son-in-law of his father's successor, William R. Tolbert Jr., whose daughter Wokie he married.

Born in 1931, "Shad" Tubman became nationally prominent in his own right early in life. During the 1950s, his father's influence caused him to be chosen the head of the country's Congress of Industrial Organizations, and he was a senator during the Tubman and Tolbert administrations. Although he was born into a prominent family and grew up as the son of the president, Tubman has compared himself to Moses in the Bible, who was born into privilege but survived extensive difficulties before becoming the leader of his people. Tubman survived the 12 April 1980 military coup d'état that saw the murder of President Tolbert and most of the country's other governmental leaders: he had attended an international governmental conference in Norway and was taking a short break in New York City on his way back when it occurred. After more than a month, he returned to Liberia and was able to be reunited with his family. Despite his heritage, Tubman was initially popular among commoners who supported the coup. Rumor on the streets held that he had been a member of the coup's leaders, the People's Redemption Council — in previous years, he had publicly opposed his father and nearly created a rift with his father-in-law because of his vehement advocacy for increasing the political participation of the country's tribal peoples. As a result, many average Monrovians believed that he had supported the natives who composed the PRC in their rising against the country's Americo-Liberian leadership.

During the chaotic years of the 1980s and 1990s, Shad and Wokie spent most of their time in the United States; along with most of their six children (two sons and four daughters), they lived in the New York metropolitan area. Here they established a Pentecostal church, the First Church of the Illumination, in the city's Harlem neighborhood. In late 2002, they returned to Liberia, hoping to contribute to the country's rebuilding and to establish a similar church in Monrovia.

Running as the RULP presidential candidate in the 11 October 2005 elections, Tubman placed 10th out of 22 candidates, receiving 1.6% of the vote. His platform embraced some developments that had occurred since 1971 while seeking to restore some of his father's policies; for example, he proposed attempting to heal the wounds of the recently concluded civil war with a renewal of his father's Unification Policy, which sought to break barriers between Americo-Liberians and natives.

Tubman Jr. passed away in September 2026, at the age of 93.
