= Alfred Reeves =

Liberian politician

Bishop Alfred Garpee Reeves (died 8 May 2009) was a Liberian politician and clergyman. Reeves was a bishop in the Church of God in Christ and a member of the National Reformation Party (NRP). He was also co-chair of Lifewater Liberia, a branch of a Canada-based non-government organization.

In January 1986 he took part in a delegation to the United States, apparently with the intention of improving the image of Liberia's government, which was then led by Samuel Doe.

Running as the NRP presidential candidate in the 11 October 2005 elections, Reeves finished last out of 22 candidates, receiving 0.3% of the vote.

Reeves died on 8 May 2009 at Duside Hospital in Firestone District, Margibi County.
