= Margaret Tor-Thompson =

Liberian politician

Margaret J. Tor-Thompson
- Born: 9 September 1962
- Died: 4 April 2007 (aged 44); Monrovia, Liberia
- Citizenship: Liberia
- Education: World Harvest Theological Seminary
- Known for: FAPL presidential candidate in the October 2005 elections

Dr. Rev. Margaret J. Tor-Thompson (9 September 1962 – 4 April 2007) was a Liberian politician and member of the Freedom Alliance Party of Liberia (FAPL). She has completed her doctorate in Biblical Studies.

Tor-Thompson had her early education in Saint Mary's Elementary & Junior High School, William R. Tolbert High School, St. Theresa's Convent and the American Cooperative School. She graduated with a nursing degree from Loma Linda University in the United States of America and received her doctorate in Bible Studies from the World Harvest Theological Seminary.

She was the FAPL presidential candidate in the October 2005 elections and was placed 13th out of 22 candidates, receiving only 0.9% of the vote. She was one of three female presidential candidates in the election, with one of them, Ellen Johnson Sirleaf went on to winning the election. She died of breast cancer at Bushrod Island on 4 April 2007.

== Early life ==
Tor-Thompson had her early education in Saint Mary's Elementary & Junior High School and high school education in William R. Tolbert High School, St. Theresa's Convent and the American Cooperative School. She graduated in nursing inn the United States of America, from nursing at Loma Linda University. She received her doctorate from the World Harvest Theological Seminary on Bible studies. Tor-Thompson was a registered nurse, Christian educator and author. She served as the Chief Executive Office (CEO) for Non-governmental organisations like Women of Might among Nations (WOMAN) and also Voice of Liberia. She was married to Dr. Charles Thompson and they have four daughters and two sons.

== Political career ==
Tor-Thomson was the Freedom Alliance Party of Liberia (FAPL) presidential candidate in the October 2005 elections. Her political manifesto in her own words was "I would make sure that the responsible people are prosecuted; that people understand the consequences; send out a clear-cut message that we will no longer tolerate crime with impunity". She was one of the three female presidential candidates in the election. She secured 8,418 out of total 1,012,673 votes to secure 0.9 per cent of the mandate and securing 13th position. The elections saw a set of candidates like Alfred Reeves and George Kiadii along with her campaigning on fundamentalist Christian platform and were less successful. Her party could not win any seat in the Senate or House of representatives.

In late April 2007, it was reported that she died of breast cancer – the death certificate confirmed the cause and indicated that she died at Bushrod Island on 4 April 2007.
