= Alaric Tokpa =

Liberian politician

Personal details
- Born: 2 August 1958 (age 67)
- Party: National Democratic Coalition (Liberia)

Alaric Kormu Tokpa is a Liberian politician and political scientist. He ran alongside George Klay Kieh in the New Deal Movement and, as a pair, received 0.5% of the vote in the 11 October 2005 presidential election. Tokpa has been pursuing a Ph.D. at Clark Atlanta University. As of 2002, Tokpa was the acting Chairman of the Department of Political Science at the University of Liberia.
