= Samuel Raymond Divine =

Liberian politician and banker

Samuel Raymond Divine, Sr. (born 20 February 1953) is a Liberian politician and banker. He was the Governor of the Liberia United Bank Incorporated, a bank which collapsed in 2005.

Running as an independent candidate in the 11 October 2005 presidential election, he placed 21st out of 22 candidates, receiving 0.3% of the vote.
