= Progressive Democratic Party (Liberia) =

Political party in Liberia

The Progressive Democratic Party (PRODEM) is a political party in Liberia, formed in 2005. It fielded candidates in the 11 October 2005 elections.

The party's presidential candidate, Sekou Conneh, was chairman of the rebel group Liberians United for Reconciliation and Democracy (LURD) during Liberia's second civil war. Conneh won 0.6% of the vote in the presidential poll. The party failed to win any seats in the Senate or House of Representatives.
