= Joseph Korto =

Liberian politician (1949–2020)

Joseph D. Z. Korto
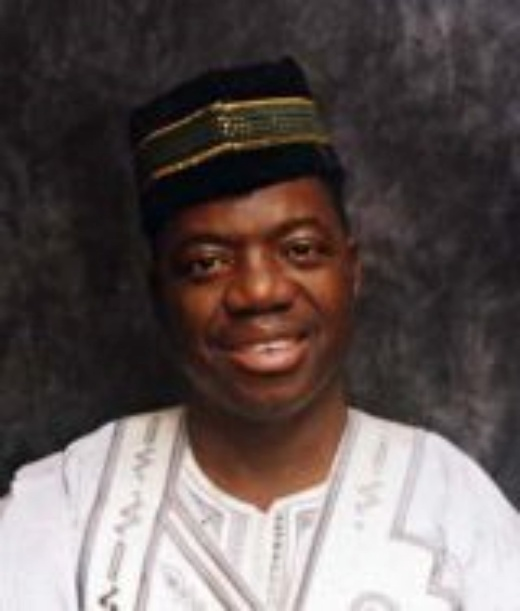

Minister of Education of Liberia
- In office January 2006 – April 2010
- President: Ellen Johnson Sirleaf

Personal details
- Born: 1949 Barpa, Nimba County, Liberia
- Died: June 21, 2020 (aged 70–71) Newark, Delaware, U.S.
- Party: Liberia Equal Rights Party (LERP)

Joseph D. Z. Korto (1949 – June 21, 2020) was a Liberian politician and member of the Liberia Equal Rights Party (LERP). Joseph Korto was born in Barpa, Nimba County, Liberia. He was Minister of Education in Liberia from 2006 to 2010 and was replaced by E. Othello Gongar, former Minister of Education during the regime of late president Samuel Kanyon Doe. He was also the executive director of the Liberian Development Foundation.

Running as the LERP (Liberian Equal Rights Party) presidential candidate in the 11 October 2005 elections, Korto placed seventh out of 22 candidates, receiving 3.3% of the vote nationally and the highest vote total in Nimba County, his home base.

After his loss in the first round of voting, he endorsed candidate Ellen Johnson Sirleaf for the second round vote against football star George Weah. Johnson-Sirleaf went on to win the election, with Korto's support being viewed as an important factor in her victory, and she appointed Korto to her cabinet as Minister of Education shortly after she took office in January 2006. Korto had a background as a teacher and held a doctorate in education from the Catholic University of America in Washington DC.

Korto died on June 21, 2020, in a Newark, Delaware, hospital.
