= Freedom Alliance Party of Liberia =

Political party in Liberia

The Freedom Alliance Party of Liberia (FAPL) was a political party in Liberia which fielded candidates in the 2005 and 2011 elections.

FAPL candidate Margaret Tor-Thompson won 0.9% of the vote in the first round of the 2005 presidential poll. The party failed to win any seats in the Senate or House of Representatives.

In the Liberian elections of 2011 the party nominated Togba-Nah Tipoteh for president.
