= Saye-Taayor Adolphus Dolo =

Liberian politician

Adolphus Dolo

Member of the Senate of Liberia from Nimba County
- In office 13 January 2006 – 9 January 2012
- Preceded by: NTLA
- Succeeded by: Thomas Grupee

Personal details
- Born: Saye-Taayor Adolphus Dolo; 21 March 1963 (age 63) Sanniquellie, Nimba, Liberia
- Party: Unity Party
- Nickname: "General Peanut Butter"

Military service
- Allegiance: National Patriotic Front
- Battles/wars: First Liberian Civil War; Second Liberian Civil War

Adolphus Dolo (born March 21, 1963) is a Liberian politician. HE was a member of the Liberian Senate representing Nimba County. He served an Army general during the presidency of Charles G. Taylor.

Senator Saye-Taayor A. Dolo was the junior senator for Nimba County. Also, he is the chairman person of the statutory committee, Internal Affairs, Governance and Reconciliation.
