= National Democratic Party of Liberia =

Political party in Liberia

- Abbreviation: NDPL
- Founded: August 1984
- Dissolved: May 2014
- Ideology: Indigenous Liberian nationalism Authoritarianism; Anti-communism; Anti-Masonry; Anti-Americo-Liberian sentiment Krahn interests
- Political position: Right-wing

The National Democratic Party of Liberia (NDPL) was a political party in Liberia.

The NDPL was formed in August 1984 by supporters of Samuel Doe, who came to power in the 1980 coup d'état. The party contested the 1985 general election with Doe as its presidential candidate. He won 50.93% of the vote in an election marred by allegations of extensive irregularities and electoral fraud. The NDPL dominated both chambers of the Legislature, winning 21 of 26 seats in the Senate and 51 of 64 in the House of Representatives. The party's control of the country ended following the outbreak of the First Liberian Civil War in 1989 and the assassination of Doe in 1990.

The party later contested the 1997 general election. George Boley, a former minister in the Doe administration, was the party's presidential candidate. He won only 1.26% of the vote, while the party failed to win any House or Senate seats.

Following the end of the Second Liberian Civil War, the party contested the 2005 general election. The NDPL's presidential candidate, Winston Tubman, placed fourth and won 9.2% of the vote. In concurrent legislative election, the party won two seats in the Senate and one in the House of Representatives.

The party was deregistered in May 2014.

== Election results ==
Year	Candidate	Votes	%	Result
1985	Samuel Doe	264.362	50.93%	Elected ✓
1997	George Boley	7.843	1.26%	Lost ✗
2005	Winston Tubman	89.623	9.20%	Lost ✗
2011	Dew Mayson	5.819	0.48%	Lost ✗
