= National Reformation Party =

Political party

The National Reformation Party (NRP) is a political party in Liberia. It participated in the 1997 elections and fielded candidates in the 11 October 2005 elections.

In 1997, NRP presidential candidate Martin Sheriff won 0.48% of the vote while the party failed to win any representation in the bicameral Legislature.

In 2005, NRP candidate Alfred Reeves won 0.3% of the vote in the presidential poll. The party won one seat in the Senate and one in the House of Representatives.
