= Daniel Naatehn =

Liberian politician (died 2023)

Daniel Flomo Naatehn Sr. (12 February 1956 – 8 August 2023) was a Liberian politician.

== Biography ==
Naatehn was born on 12 February 1956. He earned a diploma from the West African Insurance Institute and a BBA in management from the University of Liberia.

In October 2003, Naatehn represented the Civil Society Organization of Liberia in the legislature of the Liberian national transitional government.

In the 2005 election, running under the Unity Party banner, Naatehn was elected to the Senate of Liberia, representing Gbarpolu County. In the 2011 election, Naatehn was defeated for re-election. In 2014, Naatehn was again elected to the Senate, running with the Alternative National Congress (ANC). In 2019, Naatehn began serving as Chairman of the ANC, replacing L. Horatio Gould.

On 8 August 2023, Naatehn died in India, where he was undergoing medical treatment. He was serving on the Senate Committee on Transport at the time of his death. He had planned to run for re-election in the 2023 election.
