= Eddington Varmah =

Liberian politician

Eddington Varmah is a Liberian politician. He served as Justice Minister in the administration of President Charles Taylor. After Taylor resigned from office in mid-2003, Varmah was chosen as Deputy Speaker of the National Transitional Legislative Assembly of Liberia (NTLA).
