= Franklin Siakor =

Liberian politician

Franklin Obed Siakor (born December 3, 1967), served as Junior Senator for Bong County, from 2005 to 2011. He was a member of the Senate's Committee on Planning and Economic Affairs.

== Life ==
Franklin Siakor was born in Gbarnga, Bong County, and is a former pupil and teacher at St Martin's High School, Gbarnga.

Siakor holds an MA in Development Studies, a certificate in Conflict Transformation, a Teacher's certificate and is a former student of the Cuttington University College extension program.

In the 2005 general election, Siakor was elected as a junior senator for Bong County, running as an independent. In the 2014 Senate election, Siakor ran again for Bong County senator, with the Liberty Party. He was defeated by Jewel Howard-Taylor.
