= Liberia National Union =

Political party in Liberia

The Liberia National Union (LINU) is a political party in Liberia. It was formed by Dr. Harry Moniba, who served as Vice President of Liberia from 1984 to 1990. Moniba also helped to create the multi-party election system that the country currently uses. He served as LINU's first standard bearer as well. It participated in the 11 October 2005 elections as part of the three-party United Democratic Alliance (UDA) coalition.

Dr. Clarence K. Moniba, the leader of the Liberian National Union (LINU), announced on Thursday, January 19, 2023 at 5 AM his intention to run for the presidency in the 2023 elections.
