= Varney Sherman =

Liberian politician (born 1953)

Harry Varney Gboto-Nambi Sherman (born 16 February 1953) is a Liberian politician and the former chairman of the Unity Party. He is currently under OFAC sanctions by the United States.

== Early life ==
Sherman was born on 16 February 1953, in Robertsport, Grand Cape Mount County, and graduated from St. John's Episcopal High School in 1971. He continued his education at Cuttington University where he earned a degree in 1975. In 1979, he was awarded a Bachelor of Laws at the Louis Arthur Grimes School of Law at the University of Liberia in Monrovia. Sherman completed his education in 1982 in the United States where he earned a Master of Law at Harvard Law School. In 2003, Cuttington University of Liberia conferred on him the honorary LLD degree in recognition of his philanthropy, especially his personal financial and material support for higher education in Liberia.

== Early career ==
In 1980, Sherman joined the law firm of Maxwell & Maxwell as an associate, serving as a consulting attorney and a trial lawyer during the tumultuous period that followed the 1980 Liberian coup d'état. Although Sherman was a recent graduate from Harvard Law School, he was entrusted to manage the legal affairs of the firm's corporate clients, including Citibank, Chase Manhattan Bank, Tradevco Bank, and BCCI, along with engineering and construction companies Vianini, Leminkainen OY, Societa Lavori Porto Della Torre and Buccimazza Industrial Works.

== Politics ==
By 1997, in the aftermath of the First Liberian Civil War, Sherman had begun to speak prominently on political matters. A prominent Monrovia lawyer and a partner in the law firm of Sherman and Sherman, he garnered front-page newspaper coverage for a speech to the Liberian Business Association denouncing the government for what he saw as non-enforcement of a hiring policy meant to favor Liberian citizens and businesses. Running as the standard bearer of the four-party Coalition for the Transformation of Liberia (COTOL) in the 11 October 2005 presidential elections, Sherman placed fifth out of 22 candidates receiving 7.8% of the vote. He then endorsed George Weah for the run-off election.

Following the merger of his Liberian Action Party into the Unity Party in 2009, Sherman was chosen to become the party's national chair.

During the 2014 mid-term senate elections, Sherman was elected senator for Grand Cape Mount County. He won 61.7% of votes, defeating incumbent Abel Massaley and nine others. Despite this result, an electoral complaint filed by rival candidates delayed the admission of Sherman to the Senate when winners of the 2014 elections were certificated on January 5, 2015.

However, Sherman and another delayed senator, Bomi County's Morris Saytumah were certificated on February 16, 2017, following a decision by the Supreme Court.

== Personal life ==
Sherman's son, M. J. Sherman, is an American gridiron football player.
