= 2005 Liberian general election =

General election held in Liberia

- Presidential election
- 11 October 2005 (first round); 8 November 2005 (second round)
- Turnout: 74.86% (first round); 61.04% (second round)
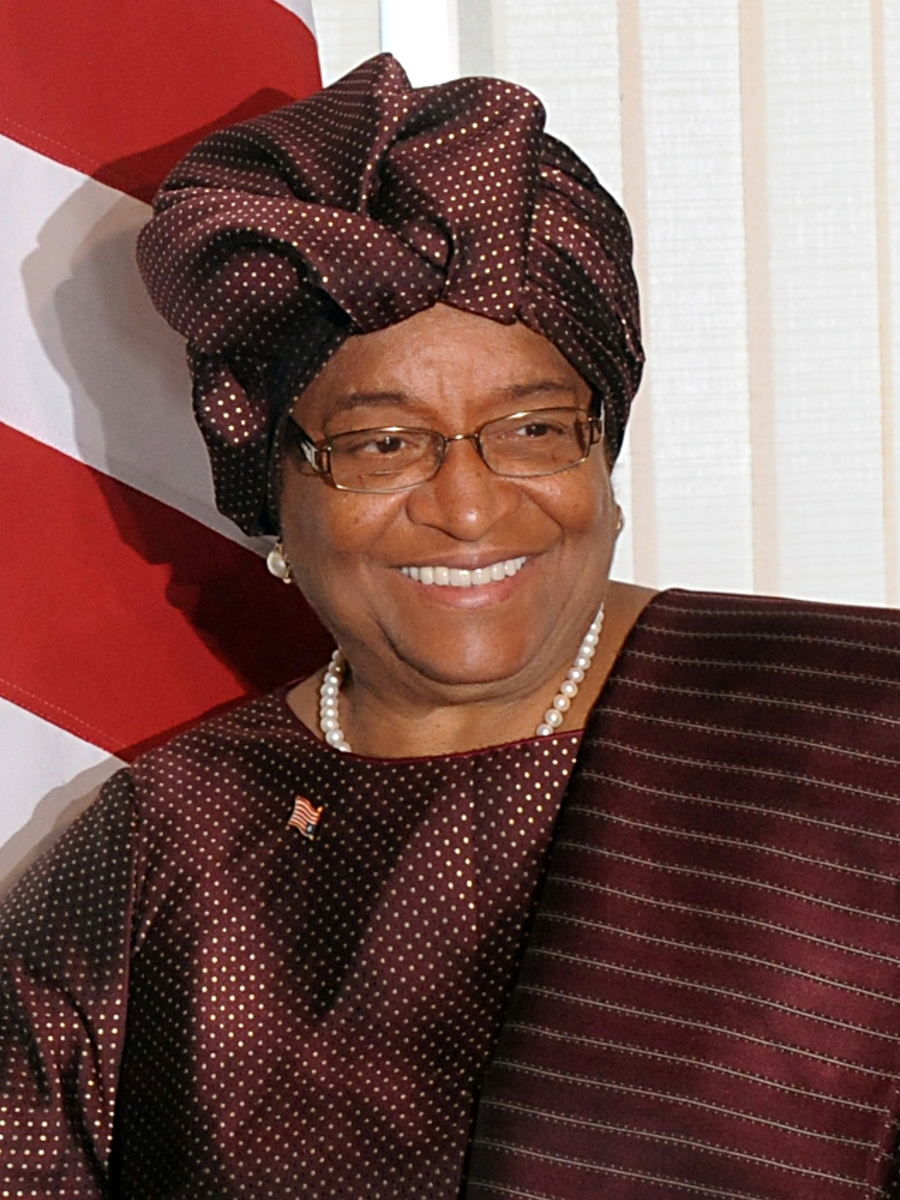

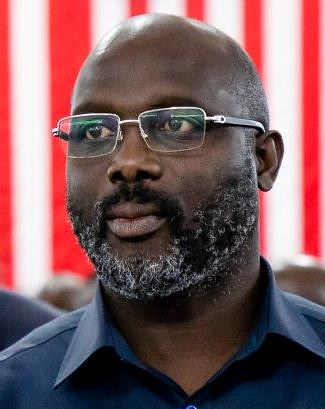
Nominee	Ellen Johnson Sirleaf	George Weah
Party	UP	CDC
Running mate	Joseph Boakai	Rudolph Johnson
Popular vote	478,526	327,046
Percentage	59.40%	40.60%
President before election
Gyude Bryant
LAP
Elected President
Ellen Johnson Sirleaf
UP

General elections were held in Liberia on 11 October 2005, with a runoff election for the presidency held on 8 November. The presidency and all seats in the House of Representatives and Senate were up for election. The elections were the first held since 1997 and marked the end of the political transition following the second civil war, having been stipulated in the Accra Comprehensive Peace Agreement of 2003. Ellen Johnson Sirleaf, former World Bank employee and Liberian finance minister, won the presidential contest and became the first democratically elected female African head of state in January 2006.

== Background ==
Frances Johnson-Morris, the chairwoman of the National Elections Commission (NEC), announced the 11 October date on 7 February 2005.

Elections were scheduled for all 64 seats in the House of Representatives, with each of Liberia's 15 counties having at least two seats and the remaining seats allotted proportionally based on voter registration. The Senate had 30 seats up for elections, with two from each county.

== Presidential candidates ==
Prior to the election, former football star George Weah was considered by many to be the favorite, due at least partially to widespread dissatisfaction with Liberia's politicians. Weah, who had been the subject of a petition published in September 2004 urging him to run, announced his candidacy in mid-November 2004 and received a hero's welcome when he arrived in Monrovia later in the month. Weah won the first round of voting but lost in the 8 November 2005 run-off. He initially filed formal fraud charges, but subsequently dropped his allegations, citing the interests of peace.

- Nathaniel Barnes — Liberia Destiny Party (LDP)
- Charles Brumskine — Liberty Party (LP)
- Sekou Conneh — Progressive Democratic Party (PRODEM)
- Samuel Raymond Divine — Independent
- David Farhat — Free Democratic Party (FDP)
- Armah Jallah — National Party of Liberia (NPL)
- Ellen Johnson Sirleaf — Unity Party (UP)
- George Kiadii — National Vision Party of Liberia (NATVIPOL)
- George Klay Kieh — New Deal Movement (NDM)
- Joseph Korto — Liberia Equal Rights Party (LERP)
- Robert Kpoto — Union of Liberian Democrats (ULD)
- Alhaji G.V. Kromah — All Liberia Coalition Party (ALCOP)
- Roland Massaquoi — National Patriotic Party (NPP)
- John Morlu — United Democratic Alliance (UDA)
- Alfred Reeves — National Reformation Party (NRP)
- Varney Sherman — Coalition for the Transformation of Liberia (COTOL)
- Togba-Nah Tipoteh — Alliance for Peace and Democracy (APD)
- Margaret Tor-Thompson — Freedom Alliance Party of Liberia (FAPL)
- Winston Tubman — National Democratic Party of Liberia (NDPL)
- William V.S. Tubman, Jr. — Reformed United Liberia Party (RULP)
- George Weah — Congress for Democratic Change (CDC)
- Joseph Woah-Tee — Labor Party of Liberia (LPL)

=== Excluded candidates ===
The chairman of the transitional government, Gyude Bryant, and other members of the transitional government did not run, according to the terms of the peace deal.

On 13 August, the election commission published a list of 22 presidential candidates who were cleared to run; six candidates were rejected, but Weah was cleared to stand despite complaints that he had adopted French citizenship. The Senate seats were contested by 206 candidates and the seats in the lower house were contested by 503 candidates. Campaigning for the elections began on 15 August.

In late September, the Supreme Court ruled that two excluded presidential candidates, Marcus Jones and Cornelius Hunter, and an excluded legislative candidate could register to run; this ruling created the possibility that the elections would have to be postponed in order to reprint ballot papers. However, these candidates later withdrew their bids, so the elections went ahead on schedule on 11 October.

== Results ==
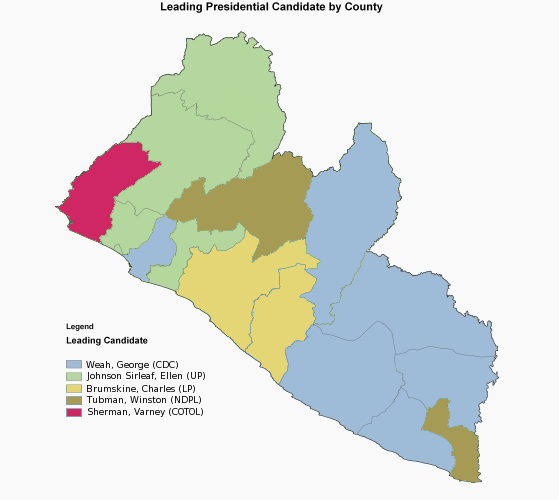
First round presidential map showing the winners of each county

=== President ===
Voting took place in two rounds, on 11 October and 8 November. Twenty-two people contested the presidential race in the first round. George Weah, former soccer star and Ellen Johnson Sirleaf, former World Bank employee and finance minister finished first and second, respectively and advanced to the second round run-off, which Johnson-Sirleaf won 59%-41%, according to the National Electoral Commission.

Weah claimed election fraud, stating elections officials were stuffing ballot boxes in Johnson-Sirleaf's favor. Most elections observers, including those from the United Nations, the European Union and the Economic Community of West African States, say that the election was clean and transparent. The Carter Center observed "minor irregularities" but no major problems. Johnson-Sirleaf reminded the press that Weah has 72 hours to bring evidence of wrongdoing to her campaign according to Liberian law, calling the accusations "lies" and stating that Weah's supporters "just don't want a woman to be President in Africa."

On 22 December 2005, Weah withdrew his protests, and in January, Ellen Johnson Sirleaf became the first democratically elected female Head of State in the history of the African Continent, and the first native female African head of state since Empress Zauditu, who ruled Ethiopia from 1916 to 1930.

Candidate	Running mate	Party	First round		Second round	
Candidate	Running mate	Party	Votes	%	Votes	%
Ellen Johnson Sirleaf	Joseph Boakai	Unity Party	192,326	19.75	478,526	59.40
George Weah	J. Rudolph Johnson	Congress for Democratic Change	275,265	28.27	327,046	40.60
Charles Brumskine	Amelia Angeline Ward	Liberty Party	135,093	13.87		
Winston Tubman	Jeremiah Sulunteh	National Democratic Party of Liberia	89,623	9.20		
Varney Sherman	John Kollehlon Fania	Coalition for the Transformation of Liberia	76,403	7.85		
Roland Massaquoi	Q. Somah Paygai Sr.	National Patriotic Party	40,361	4.14		
Joseph Korto	James Kollie Barclay Jr.	Liberia Equal Rights Party	31,814	3.27		
Alhaji G.V. Kromah	Emmanuel Mac Russell Sr.	All Liberia Coalition Party	27,141	2.79		
Togba-Nah Tipoteh	Marcus S. G. Dahn	Alliance for Peace and Democracy	22,766	2.34		
William V.S. Tubman Jr.	Garlo Isaac Williams	Reformed United Liberia Party	15,115	1.55		
John Morlu	Joseph Omaxline Demen	United Democratic Alliance	12,068	1.24		
Nathaniel Barnes	Parleh Dargbeh Harris	Liberia Destiny Party	9,325	0.96		
Margaret Tor-Thompson	J. Rudolph Marsh Sr.	Freedom Alliance Party of Liberia	8,418	0.86		
Joseph Woah-Tee	Samuel Washington Broh I.	Labor Party of Liberia	5,948	0.61		
Sekou Conneh	Edward Yarkpawolo Sali	Progressive Democratic Party	5,499	0.56		
David Farhat	Saah Ciapha Gbollie	Free Democratic Party	4,497	0.46		
George Klay Kieh	Alaric Tokpa	New Deal Movement	4,476	0.46		
Armah Jallah	Isaac G. Sammy Sr.	National Party of Liberia	3,837	0.39		
Robert Kpoto	Sylvester Bondo Singbe	Union of Liberian Democrats	3,825	0.39		
George Kiadii	Washington Shadrack McGill	National Vision Party of Liberia	3,646	0.37		
Samuel Raymond Divine	Jacob Gbanalagaye Mamu Sr.	Independent	3,188	0.33		
Alfred Reeves	Martin Mohammed Njavola Sherif	National Reformation Party	3,156	0.32		
Total			973,790	100.00	805,572	100.00
Valid votes			973,790	96.16	805,572	97.56
Invalid/blank votes			38,883	3.84	20,144	2.44
Total votes			1,012,673	100.00	825,716	100.00
Registered voters/turnout			1,352,730	74.86	1,352,730	61.04

=== House of Representatives ===
Party	Votes	%	Seats
Congress for Democratic Change	157,753	16.87	15
Coalition for the Transformation of Liberia	137,897	14.74	8
Liberty Party	125,496	13.42	9
Unity Party	123,373	13.19	8
National Patriotic Party	78,751	8.42	4
Alliance for Peace and Democracy	38,285	4.09	5
New Deal Movement	35,721	3.82	3
National Democratic Party	29,402	3.14	1
National Reformation Party	22,542	2.41	1
All Liberia Coalition Party	19,471	2.08	2
Free Democratic Party	19,326	2.07	0
United Democratic Alliance	13,958	1.49	1
Progressive Democratic Party	11,997	1.28	0
Freedom Alliance Party	11,126	1.19	0
Union of Liberian Democrats	10,089	1.08	0
Labor Party of Liberia	7,811	0.84	0
Liberia Equal Rights Party	7,256	0.78	0
Reformed United Liberia Party	6,252	0.67	0
Liberia Destiny Party	5,493	0.59	0
National Vision Party of Liberia	3,443	0.37	0
National Party of Liberia	1,532	0.16	0
Independents	68,387	7.31	7
Total	935,361	100.00	64
Valid votes	935,361	94.68	
Invalid/blank votes	52,550	5.32	
Total votes	987,911	100.00	
Registered voters/turnout	1,291,541	76.49	

=== Senate ===
As no Senate existed prior to the elections, each voter was eligible to cast two ballots for different candidates. The two candidates with the highest number of votes in each county were elected. The candidate with the highest share of votes became the senior senator for the county, elected to a nine-year term. The candidate with the second-highest share became the junior senator, elected to a six-year term. This method was chosen in order to reintroduce a staggered electoral system.

Party	Votes	%	Seats
Congress for Democratic Change	252,677	14.94	3
Coalition for the Transformation of Liberia	232,636	13.76	7
Unity Party	222,705	13.17	4
Liberty Party	213,002	12.60	3
National Patriotic Party	178,259	10.54	3
Alliance for Peace and Democracy	119,091	7.04	3
National Democratic Party	60,668	3.59	2
All Liberia Coalition Party	28,385	1.68	1
Progressive Democratic Party	17,262	1.02	0
Reformed United Liberia Party	13,293	0.79	0
Freedom Alliance Party	13,050	0.77	0
National Reformation Party	12,037	0.71	1
United Democratic Alliance	11,265	0.67	0
Union of Liberian Democrats	5,503	0.33	0
New Deal Movement	4,264	0.25	0
Liberia Destiny Party	3,431	0.20	0
Labor Party	1,645	0.10	0
Independents	301,729	17.84	3
Total	1,690,902	100.00	30
Valid votes	981,467	96.92	
Invalid/blank votes	31,206	3.08	
Total votes	1,012,673	100.00	
Registered voters/turnout	1,291,541	78.41	

==== Results by county ====
The following are the results for the 2005 Senate elections from the National Elections Commission.

2005 Bomi County Senatorial election
Party	Candidate	Votes	%
NDPL	Lahai Gbabye Lansanah	5,403	12.2%
COTOL	Richard Blamah Devine	5,198	11.7%
NPP	Sando Dazoe Johnson	4,523	10.2%
UP	Mohammed Aliu Massaley	4,247	9.6%
NDPL	G. Aaron Sando	4,227	9.5%
LP	Rebecca T. Benson	3,792	8.5%
CDC	Faliku G. Sarnor	3,259	7.3%
NPP	Alfred Boimah Anderson	2,997	6.7%
ALCOP	Musah Balloh	2,882	6.5%
LP	Samuel Njalbae Brown	2,226	5.0%
UP	Amos Boima Ko-Juah	2,094	4.7%
COTOL	Hajah Sheri Washington	2,012	4.5%
LDP	Lincoln Vincent	867	1.9%
APD	Erik Bauman Vincent	741	1.7%
Total votes		44,468	100.0
Rejected ballots		1,129	

2005 Bong County Senatorial election
Party	Candidate	Votes	%
NPP	Jewel Howard-Taylor	50,452	28.4%
Independent	Franklin Obed Siakor	35,422	20.0%
NPP	Melee I. L. Kermue	14,742	8.3%
COTOL	Ranney Banama Jackson	13,931	7.8%
CDC	Molley O. K. Tokpah	10,969	6.2%
COTOL	Joseph N. Cornormia	10,257	5.8%
LP	Martin Fahnlon Kerkula Sr.	6,294	3.5%
UP	Delores Zoe Lake	5,867	3.3%
LP	Paul Mhulbah Richards	5,073	2.9%
UP	Mustapha A. Kamara	4,981	2.8%
NDPL	Fata S. Samuels	4,743	2.7%
CDC	Olive Quita Davies	3,844	2.2%
PRODEM	Lassana M. Sirleaf	3,306	1.9%
PRODEM	Othello F. Dolo	2,751	1.6%
FAPL	Lysander B. Wokpeh	2,736	1.5%
Independent	Lasana Abraham Seesee	2,100	1.2%
Total votes		177,468	100.0
Rejected ballots		5,075	

2005 Gbarpolu County Senatorial election
Party	Candidate	Votes	%
NRP	Samuel Sumo Tometie	4,693	22.2%
UP	Daniel Naatehn	3,016	14.3%
Independent	A. Kanie Wesso	2,230	10.6%
NPP	Siafa Varney Gaindeh Konneh Sr.	2,050	9.7%
COTOL	William M. Seh	1,943	9.2%
NDPL	Harris Fomba Tarnue Sr.	1,626	7.7%
COTOL	Isaac Freeman Mannah Sr.	1,587	7.5%
CDC	Jestina V. Dukuky	1,403	6.6%
UP	Joseph Jarleakai Taweh	995	4.7%
LP	George Blama Kollie	814	3.9%
LP	Edward Sumo Mends-Cole	770	3.6%
Total votes		21,127	100.0
Rejected ballots		266	

2005 Grand Bassa County Senatorial election
Party	Candidate	Votes	%
Independent	Gbehzohngar Milton Findley	25,036	21.2%
LP	Nathaniel K. Innis Sr.	20,949	17.7%
Independent	John F. Whitfield Jr.	12,618	10.7%
LP	Hilary Yhrakehmenn Reeves	11,454	9.7%
UP	William Bill Patrick Davis	9,070	7.7%
COTOL	Andrew Dehkpo Vah	7,078	6.0%
Independent	Charles Jefferson Johnson	5,464	4.6%
COTOL	Wesley Bonne Robinson Sr.	5,215	4.4%
CDC	Julia Saturday Marshall	4,921	4.2%
CDC	Lee Pennalton Reeves	4,586	3.9%
NPP	Ellen Janjay Natt	4,085	3.5%
NDPL	Joseph O. Lathrobe	3,321	2.8%
FAPL	Nathan Alphonsus Onumah	2,909	2.5%
FAPL	Matthew Alan Wolo	1,455	1.2%
Total votes		118,161	100.0
Rejected ballots		2,526	

2005 Grand Cape Mount County Senatorial election
Party	Candidate	Votes	%
NPP	Abel Momolu Massalay	12,415	28.9%
NPP	James Kormah Momo	6,955	16.2%
COTOL	Varney Paasewe	6,738	15.7%
COTOL	Rudolph Emmett Sherman	5,193	12.1%
LP	Edison T. Vaanii Gbana	4,307	10.0%
CDC	M. Kdaiia Gray	1,550	3.6%
CDC	Jenneh M. Kamara	1,527	3.6%
NDPL	J. Siafa Bondokai III	1,267	2.9%
UP	Mambu George David	1,172	2.7%
LP	Ma-John T. Fahnbulleh	940	2.2%
LDP	Arthur Bamoley Freeman	890	2.1%
Total votes		42,954	100.0
Rejected ballots		974	

2005 Grand Gedeh County Senatorial election
Party	Candidate	Votes	%
NDPL	Isaac Wehyee Nyenabo	8,331	19.6%
COTOL	William Cheyety Sandy	6,537	15.4%
UP	Alphonso G. Gaye	5,091	12.0%
CDC	Augustine N. Saydee	4,657	11.0%
COTOL	Philip Bayor Dwuye Sr.	4,105	9.7%
NDPL	Seward K. Boons	4,036	9.5%
UP	John N. Wallace	3,198	7.5%
CDC	Amos Querty Kannah	2,773	6.5%
LP	Annie Suah Dennis	2,113	5.0%
LPL	Edward N. Slanger	1,645	3.9%
Total votes		42,486	100.0
Rejected ballots		558	

2005 Grand Kru County Senatorial election
Party	Candidate	Votes	%
COTOL	Cletus Wotorson	3,528	16.3%
APD	Blamoh Nelson	3,175	14.6%
LP	J. Sawoloday Doe	2,119	9.8%
APD	Amos Yonkon Bartu	2,107	9.7%
Independent	Zaw-Dioh Weah	1,962	9.0%
CDC	Beatrice Nimene Sherman	1,697	7.8%
COTOL	Numene T. H. Bartekwa	1,681	7.7%
CDC	Thompson N. Jargba	1,052	4.8%
LP	Samuel E. K. Kyne	892	4.1%
NPP	Thomas Nah Nimely	770	3.5%
NDM	Victor E. Dweh Kaydor Sr.	743	3.4%
Independent	W. Frey Augustus Bedell Sr.	679	3.1%
UP	Tiahkwee Weah Johnson	441	2.0%
NDPL	D. Nyandeh Sieh Sr.	424	2.0%
UP	Rosalind Segbe Tonne Sneh	421	1.9%
Total votes		21,691	100.0
Rejected ballots		347	

2005 Lofa County Senatorial election
Party	Candidate	Votes	%
COTOL	Sumo G. Kupee	13,325	15.4%
ALCOP	Fomba Kanneh	11,096	12.8%
CDC	Saa Philip Joe	7,123	8.2%
NPP	Stanely Sumo Kparkillen	6,674	7.7%
LP	Kollie Massayan Sorsor Sr.	6,319	7.3%
NDPL	Samuel Kpehe Ngaima Sr.	5,823	6.7%
UP	Fayah Joe Sahr Gbollie	5,777	6.7%
ULD	Massaquoi Morlu Kamara	5,503	6.4%
UDA	Frederick Sayon Gbegbe	5,117	5.9%
CDC	Joseph Hinnah Farkollie	4,465	5.2%
UP	Lavela Koboi Johnson	3,815	4.4%
LP	Lwopu Gawee Kandakai	3,742	4.3%
NRP	Alfred S. Kamara	2,697	3.1%
COTOL	Phillip Saa Tali	2,228	2.6%
PRODEM	Josephus M. Karbar	1,515	1.7%
APD	Flomo Yanquiwolo Kokolo	1,398	1.6%
Total votes		86,617	100.0
Rejected ballots		2,054	

2005 Margibi County Senatorial election
Party	Candidate	Votes	%
LP	Clarice Alpha Jah	22,726	19.1%
CDC	Roland Cooper Kaine	15,215	12.8%
UP	William E. Dennis	10,756	9.0%
COTOL	Joe Roberts Leital	9,303	7.8%
RULP	Charles D. Bennie	8,035	6.7%
NPP	Sampson Bedell Fahn	7,808	6.6%
UP	Joseph Jensen Bowier	7,779	6.5%
NDPL	John M. Penneh	6,368	5.3%
LP	Benjamin Kolo-V. Wymon	6,081	5.1%
NPP	Bestus Peter Davis	5,979	5.0%
COTOL	Michael S. Mulbah Sr.	5,085	4.3%
CDC	A. Sylvester Garwon	4,835	4.1%
NRP	Mohamed Taqii Kromah	2,580	2.2%
APD	Abraham B. Y. Jusu Garneo	2,386	2.0%
RULP	Clarence Benjamin Townsend	2,158	1.8%
NRP	James Adof Neblett	2,067	1.7%
Total votes		119,161	100.0
Rejected ballots		2,673	

2005 Maryland County Senatorial election
Party	Candidate	Votes	%
UP	John Akel Ballout Jr.	7,147	15.0%
UP	Gloria Maya Musu-Scott	6,933	14.6%
LP	Paul R. Jeffy	4,479	9.4%
APD	Mason Chumue Goe	4,432	9.3%
NDPL	Anthony S. Wloflo Bedell	4,102	8.6%
CDC	E. Danny Neufville	3,871	8.1%
LP	James Lamark Cox Sr.	3,386	7.1%
NDPL	Robert Alexandeer Brewer Jr.	3,106	6.5%
COTOL	Wilfred Ernest Clark	2,787	5.9%
CDC	Eric Deiojue Kitue Folee	2,241	4.7%
COTOL	Willie Dalleh Ragland	2,083	4.4%
APD	Theodosia Minikon Clark-Wah	1,437	3.0%
RULP	Alexander Mcknight Hutchins	941	2.0%
NPP	J. Kla Toomey	603	1.3%
Total votes		47,548	100.0
Rejected ballots		1,003	

2005 Montserrado County Senatorial election
Party	Candidate	Votes	%
CDC	Joyce Musu Freeman	86,008	13.3%
CDC	Hannah G. Brent	80,331	12.4%
UP	Clemenceau Blayon Urey	70,137	10.8%
APD	Wilson Kargeor Tarpeh	67,913	10.5%
Independent	Josephine M. George Francis	60,084	9.3%
LP	Kadie Sannor Kamara	41,964	6.5%
COTOL	Nathaniel Reginald Richardson	41,879	6.5%
LP	Ola Walker Jallah	38,524	5.9%
UP	Roland Kollie Woheel Sr.	37,599	5.8%
Independent	Ruth Gibson Caesar	20,261	3.1%
Independent	Losene F. Bility	19,225	3.0%
NPP	Jessie S. Payne Sr.	18,916	2.9%
COTOL	Rudolph Travers	15,863	2.4%
ALCOP	Chemon Feson Jackitay	14,407	2.2%
NPP	Bob D. Taylor	14,021	2.2%
PRODEM	Amara M. Kromah	9,214	1.4%
FAPL	Daniel Success Seakor	5,717	0.9%
NDPL	Charles Max Kumeh	5,508	0.9%
Total votes		647,571	100.0
Rejected ballots		10,438	

2005 Nimba County Senatorial election
Party	Candidate	Votes	%
Independent	Prince Johnson	81,820	33.8%
COTOL	Saye-Taayor Adolphus Dolo	42,229	17.4%
Independent	Evans Vaye Koah	34,828	14.4%
APD	Cooper W. Kruah Sr.	15,647	6.5%
UP	Nyah Mantein	13,475	5.6%
NPP	Harrison Dologbean Luo	13,070	5.4%
LP	Josephus Saye Dokie	7,960	3.3%
NPP	Prince B. Myers	7,198	3.0%
LP	Mac Sonkarley Noah	6,553	2.7%
COTOL	Emma Kou Wuor	6,355	2.6%
UP	Harry Targehn Yuan Sr.	4,958	2.0%
UDA	Benedict Zuah Bartuah	2,883	1.2%
UDA	Ansumana Fassu Kromah	2,233	0.9%
RULP	Mary Siaway Dogolea	2,159	0.9%
NDPL	Peter S. T. Senneh	991	0.4%
Total votes		242,359	100.0
Rejected ballots		2,879	

2005 Rivercess County Senatorial election
Party	Candidate	Votes	%
UP	Jay Jonathan Banney	4,378	21.2%
LP	George Dee Moore	2,983	14.4%
NDM	Arthur D. K. Sawmadal	2,655	12.8%
LP	Francis Saturday Paye	2,199	10.6%
CDC	Davidson Tompo Monweh Sr.	1,790	8.7%
UP	Francis B. S. Johnson	1,480	7.2%
CDC	Uriah Glaybo	1,195	5.8%
APD	James G. Baryoegar	1,095	5.3%
COTOL	Jasper Morris Ben	1,019	4.9%
NDM	Dorr Henry Sobeor	866	4.2%
COTOL	Roberto Gbegba Dole	643	3.1%
NPP	Moses Jududoes Pearson	370	1.8%
Total votes		20,673	100.0
Rejected ballots		560	

2005 River Gee County Senatorial election
Party	Candidate	Votes	%
COTOL	Frederick Doe Cherue	7,490	26.9%
COTOL	Isaac Nyenekartoe Johnson	2,992	10.7%
UP	Conmany Wesseh	2,856	10.3%
NPP	A. Nyenpan Saytue Sr.	2,149	7.7%
CDC	Nathan Victor Morlee	2,022	7.3%
APD	Benjamin Belju-Wleh Jlah Sr.	1,689	6.1%
LDP	Nathaniel J. Williams	1,674	6.0%
LP	Christian Snorteh Chea	1,463	5.3%
UP	Anthony W. C. Slobert Sr.	1,424	5.1%
NDPL	Samuel C. F. Johnson	1,392	5.0%
LP	Clara A. Dalmeida	1,092	3.9%
UDA	Chea Cheapoo Sr.	1,032	3.7%
CDC	Regina Saytue Vinton	339	1.2%
FAPL	G. Saygbegee Davis Sr.	233	0.8%
Total votes		27,847	100.0
Rejected ballots		351	

2005 Sinoe County Senatorial election
Party	Candidate	Votes	%
APD	Mobutu Vlah Nyenpan	9,165	29.8%
APD	Joseph Nyenetue Nagbe	7,906	25.7%
COTOL	Nathaniel Sniweah Bartee	4,352	14.1%
UP	Charles Amstard Clarke	3,598	11.7%
NPP	Harrison Nimleh Slewon Sr.	2,482	8.1%
LP	Julius Blamo Doe	1,129	3.7%
CDC	Stephen Sloh Sarploh	1,004	3.3%
LP	Emma G. Turplue	659	2.1%
PRODEM	Myrtle Francelle Gibson	476	1.5%
Total votes		30,771	100.0
Rejected ballots		373	
