= Joseph Woah-Tee =

Liberian politician

Joseph Mamadee Woah-Tee (16 August 1948 - 31 May 2009) was a Liberian politician and member of the Labor Party of Liberia (LPL). A native of Bong County, he founded the Woah-Tee Progressive Movement.

== Early life ==
Woah-Tee was born on August 16, 1949, in Gbaomu, Bong County. He earned a bachelor of science degree from the University of Liberia as well as two master's degrees in the United States from Morgan State University. Woah-Tee earned his Ph.D. from the University of Maryland, College Park.

== Politics ==
Running as the LPL presidential candidate in the 11 October 2005 elections, Woah-Tee placed 14th out of 22 candidates, receiving 0.6% of the vote. He is the founder of the Woah-Tee Progressive Movement.

== Death ==
Joseph Woah-Tee was murdered on May 31, 2009, during a robbery attempt in Baltimore, Maryland. He ran an event hall called the Gaimei Nangbn Woah-Tee Multi-Purpose Neighborhood Center in the 4300 block of York Road. A party had just let out when a man walked into the office and demanded money from Woah-Tee. A struggle ensued and Woah-Tee was shot in the chest and died.
