= John Morlu =

Liberian politician

John Sembe Morlu II is an economist.

In 2006, after an extensive international search, the European Union recruited Morlu to become the Auditor-General of Liberia. Morlu assumed office in April 2007 and his tenured ended in April 2011. Morlu has extensive background in public accounting and management consulting, working major companies in the USA such as Unisys and BearingPoint.

John Morlu produced more reports, including financial, compliance, internal controls, operational and also fraud investigative reports that indicted high-profile officials. Morlu audits are highly cover by local and international media including Newsweek, Businessweek, Africa Confidential. Morlu audit reports are also referenced in State Department Reports and UN Secretary General Reports to the Security Council on Liberia. Morlu is highly credited for financial management improvements in Liberia https://web.archive.org/web/20120125195826/http://www.crisisgroup.org/~/media/Files/africa/west-africa/liberia/177%20Liberia%20-%20How%20Sustainable%20is%20the%20Recovery.pdf

John Morlu is a CPA in the District of Columbia. He also holds multiple professional certifications include CFE, CMA, CIA, CITP, CGMA, CGFM, CGA and CFM. Morlu holds an MBA in Finance from Johns Hopkins University, a Masters in International Commerce and Policy from George Mason University, and double bachelors in Economics and International Relations from the University of Virginia.
