= Weala =

Town in Margibi County, Liberia

- Town
- Location in Liberia
- Coordinates: 6.67219°N 10.22392°W
- Country: Liberia
- County: Margibi County
- Township / District: Cinta Township; Electoral District No. 5
- Elevation: 99 m (325 ft)
- Time zone: UTC+0 (GMT)

Weala is a town in Margibi County, central Liberia, located within Cinta Township (Electoral District No. 5).

== Geography ==
Weala lies along the main overland corridor between Kakata (the capital of Margibi County) and Gbarnga, roughly 75–80 km by road northeast of Monrovia.

Its elevation is about 99 m, and the area has a tropical monsoon (Am) climate.

== Administration ==
Weala falls within Cinta Township in Margibi's Electoral District No. 5, represented in the House of Representatives by Clarence G. Gahr.

In the Senate, Emmanuel J. Nuquay of the People's Unification Party and Nathaniel F. McGill of the Coalition for Demoncratic Change represent Weala.

Local advocacy in 2017 sought recognition of Weala's growth and argued for eventual city status.

== Economy ==
The economy relies on cassava and rubber farming.

In 2025, the Ministry of Agriculture reported preparations in Weala for a cassava-starch-processing factory as part of efforts to improve market access for cassava farmers.

Weala also hosts facilities of the Salala Rubber Corporation (under Jeety Rubber).

== Infrastructure and services ==
Weala sits on the Monrovia–Kakata–Gbarnga highway system served by minibuses and motorcycle taxis (pen-pen).

In 2023, Jeety Rubber provided deep-bore submersible pumps to improve access to safe water for residents in and around Weala as part of corporate-social-responsibility programs.

== See also ==
- Margibi County
- Kakata
- Gbarnga
