= List of speakers of the House of Representatives of Liberia =

The Speaker of the House of Representatives of Liberia is the presiding officer of the legislature. In the current house, the speaker is elected by the house for the term of the legislature, six years. The Speaker may be removed from their position by a two-thirds majority. A Deputy Speaker is also elected, and, in the event of a vacancy in the speakership, serves as Speaker until the election of a replacement, which is to occur within sixty days. The Speaker is also responsible for appointing members to House Committees. This article lists the presiding officers of Liberia's lower house, which has been most often known as the House of Representatives.

== List ==
This is an incomplete list of speakers of the House of Representatives of Liberia:

Name	Took office	Left office	Notes
James B. McGill	1848	1848	
Daniel Bashiel Warner	1848	1849	
Edward James Roye	1849	1850	
Charles Henry	1850	1851	
Beverly R. Wilson	1851	1853	
Beverly V. R. James	1853	?	
H. W. Erskine	?	1855	
James M. Moore	1855	1856	
Mathew A. Rand	1856	1857 - ?	
Robert H. Marshall	1859	1860	
Anthony William Gardner	1860	1861	
Ezra W. Wright	December 1861	?	
A. J. Woods	?	?	
Dixon B. Brown	?	?	
William Draper	?	?	
Edward Lyles	?	?	
Henry B. Whitfield	?	?	
Daniel E. MacFarland	?	?	
Henry Wesley Dennis	1863	1864 - ?	
Augustus Washington	1865	1869	
William Spencer Anderson	1869	1871	
D. P. Wilson	1871	1876	
Nathan E. Dixon	1876	1877	
William David Coleman	1877	1879	
C. R. Sim	? - 1880	1881 - ?	
E.- B. Cummings	? - 1882	1882 - ?	
J.-N. Lewis	? - 1885	1888 - ?	
Alexander Glen Tubman	? - 1889	1889 - ?	
F. O. Thorne	? - 1890	1893 - ?	
Z. J. Greene	? - 1894	1894 - ?	
Robert B. Richardson	1895	1896 - ?	
J. C. Johnson	1897	1899 - ?	
Robert H. Marshall	? - 1900	1903	
D. R. Worrell	1900	1901	Speaker pro tempore
James A. Toliver	1903	1906 - ?	
Samuel Alfred Ross	1907	?	
James A. Toliver	? - 1908	1909 - ?	
J. J. Ellis	? - 1910	1910 - ?	
T. A. McCarthy	? - 1912	1912 - ?	
Stephen Allen Liberty	? - 1914	1917 - ?	
John Gottlieb A. Richards	1918	1919	
Philip J. L. Brumskine	1919	1923	
Stephen Allen Liberty	? - 1925	1929	
John N. Lewis	1929	1931	
Clarence Lorenzo Simpson	1931	1934	
Richard Wiles	1935	1936	
Richard Wiles	1940	1940	
Richard Wiles	1942	1945	
Benjamin Green Freeman	1943	1951	
Richard Abrom Henries, Sr.	1952	12 April 1980	

This is a list of speakers of the Interim National Assembly:

Name	Took office	Left office	Notes
Nicholas Podier	1984	1984	

This is a list of presidents of the Interim National Assembly:

Name	Took office	Left office	Notes
Samuel Doe	26 July 1984	1985	

This is a list of speakers of the House of Representatives of Liberia:

Name	Took office	Left office	Notes
Samuel Dualu Hill	1986	1990	

This is a list of speakers of the Interim National Assembly (ILA):

Name	Took office	Left office	Notes
Bismarck Kuyon	? - 1992	1993	

This is a list of speakers of the Transitional National Assembly (TLA):

Name	Took office	Left office	Notes
Morris Dukuly	11 March 1994	February 1997	
Lusinee Kamara	27 February 1997	1997	

This is a list of speakers of the House of Representatives of Liberia:

Name	Took office	Left office	Notes
Nyudueh Morkonmana	July 1997	2003	

This is a list of speakers of the National Transitional Legislative Assembly of Liberia (NTLA):

Name	Took office	Left office	Notes
George Dweh	20 October 2003	14 March 2005	
George Koukou	17 March 2005	January 2006	

This is a list of speakers of the House of Representatives of Liberia:

Name	Took office	Left office	Notes
Edwin Melvin Snowe	13 January 2006	18 January 2007	
?	18 January 2007	29 January 2007	
Edwin Melvin Snowe	29 January 2007	15 February 2007	
Alex J. Tyler	7 April 2007	27 September 2016	
James Emmanuel Nuquay	October 2016	15 January 2018	
Bhofal Chambers	15 January 2018	15 January 2024	
Jonathan F. Koffa	15 January 2024	21 November 2024 (Note: While Koon was initially elected speaker on 21 November 2024, and would serve as such, the Supreme Court would rule his leadership illegal, affirming Jonathan F. Koffa as the lawful speaker. Koffa would resign on 12 May 2025, and Koon would be properly elected the following day.)	
Richard Koon	21 November 2024	Incumbent	
