= Liberia–Soviet Union relations =

Liberia-Soviet Union relations
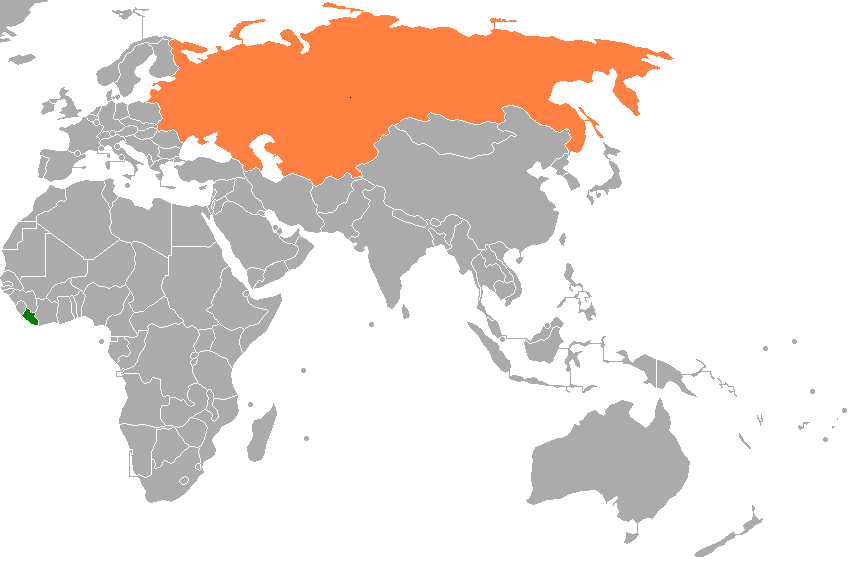

- Liberia: Soviet Union

Liberia–Soviet relations were the bilateral relations between Liberia and Soviet Union. Contacts between the two countries were sporadic during the 1950s and 1960s, improved during the 1970s but became frosty in the 1980s.

== Early years ==
In 1924 Matzenau, the former envoy of Liberia to Russia, tested the waters with the Soviet government on establishing bilateral relations. The Soviets initially expressed interest in the proposal, but no diplomatic links materialized.

== Tubman era ==
In 1946 negotiations for a Liberian-Soviet friendship treaty took place, but no agreement materialized. In 1952 the Liberian government sent an invitation to the Soviet Union to attend the second presidential inauguration of William V.S. Tubman. The Soviets declined the invitation. In January 1956 a Soviet delegation attended the third presidential inauguration of Tubman, the first Soviet ambassadorial level representation in sub-Saharan Africa. The Soviet delegation at the inauguration was led by Alexander P. Volkov, Chairman of the Supreme Soviet. Volkov offered economic aid to Liberia, but the offer was rejected by Tubman. The New China News Agency lauded the establishment of a Soviet diplomatic presence in Africa as a backlash for Western imperialism.

Over the coming years contacts between the two countries were sporadic. The Soviets invited Tubman to visit Moscow in 1956, but the invitation brought a counter-reaction from the United States, Liberia's traditional ally. Tubman was informed that a state visit to Moscow would affect US-Liberian relations negatively. Tubman remained skeptical of Soviet intentions, and declined formalization of diplomatic relations. In September 1957 a Liberian agricultural delegation visited the Soviet Union. In June 1959 a Liberian health delegation visited the Soviet Union, followed by an agricultural delegation the following month.

Nuritdin Mukhitdinov led the Soviet delegation at the fourth presidential inauguration of Tubman in January 1960. In November 1960 a delegation of Liberian local government officials visited the Soviet Union. In February 1962 a Soviet scientific team, led by Cosmonaut Yuri Gagarin, visited Liberia. In August 1962 the Liberian Vice President William R. Tolbert Jr. visited the Soviet Union. In October 1962 a Soviet cultural delegation visited Liberia, followed by a Liberian cultural delegation to the Soviet Union in April 1963 and a Soviet cultural troupe to Liberia in December the same year.

== Tolbert era ==
Liberian-Soviet relations improved during the presidency of Tolbert. One year after assuming the Liberian presidency, there was a mutual agreement (issued in Monrovia and Moscow) in June 1972 on establishing embassies. The first Liberian ambassador to the Soviet Union was Francis A. Dennis, his Soviet counterpart in Monrovia was Dmitri Safonov. Safonov was later replaced by A.A. Oulanov.

In 1974 Liberia accepted economic aid from the Soviet Union. After a 1976 agreement, Liberian students were given scholarships to study in the Soviet Union.

On May 19, 1979 a Liberian-Soviet Scientific and Cultural Agreement was signed. A Liberian parliamentary delegation visited the Soviet Union May 26-June 1, 1977. The delegation was led by Richard A. Henries, Speaker of the House of Representatives. A delegation of the Supreme Soviet visited Liberia November 16–22, 1978.

During the final months of the Tolbert presidency, relations deteriorated and some Soviet diplomats were expelled from Liberia.

== Doe years ==
Liberian-Soviet relations deteriorated under the Samuel Doe presidency, who would align himself closely with Ronald Reagan. Nevertheless, the Soviet Union, Cuba, Libya and others were initially positive to the Doe-led coup in 1980. Soon after the coup, Doe renewed diplomatic links with the Soviet Union. Under the People's Redemption Council regime, James E. Morgan was named ambassador to the Soviet Union. He was later followed by Christopher Ricks. On October 24, 1980 an agreement was signed on air services between Liberia and the Soviet Union.

In 1983 Doe expelled Soviet diplomats from Liberia, including the ambassador Oulanov, accusing the Soviet Union of supporting a Libyan plot to remove him from power. Oulanov was declared persona non grata on November 22, 1983. The Soviets expelled Ambassador Ricks in retaliation.

Doe closed the Soviet embassy in Monrovia on July 18, 1985. Fourteen Liberian students were arrested, accused of sharing intelligence with the Soviet embassy. On August 3, 1985 the Soviets reciprocated by closing the Liberian embassy in Moscow. Reportedly Zaire would represent Liberia in the Soviet Union after the break of diplomatic links, and Poland would represent the Soviet Union in Liberia. Normal diplomatic relations were restored in July 1986. In 1989 a delegation of the Union of Soviet Journalists visited the Press Union of Liberia, a visit that Doe warily allowed.

== See also ==
- Foreign relations of Liberia
- Foreign relations of Russia
