= Nyudueh Morkonmana =

Liberian politician

Speaker of the House of Representatives of Liberia
- In office July 1997 – 2003
- Preceded by: Lusinee Kamara
- Succeeded by: George Dweh

Personal details
- Political party: National Patriotic Party

Nyudueh Morkonmana is a Liberian politician and former Speaker of the House of Representatives of Liberia.

Morkonmana was one of Charles Taylor's associates, and a senior officer of Union of Liberian Associations in the Americas (ULAA) in the 1970s. He was a member of NPFL. He was the chairman of the National Elections Commission from 1991 to November 1996.

In 1997, Morkonmana was a senior member of National Patriotic Party of Charles Taylor. He was elected to the House of Representatives from Grand Kru County in 1997. He served as Speaker of the House of Representatives from July 1997 to 2003, when National Transitional Legislative Assembly of Liberia was established.

In 2022, Morkonmana was elected as the interim leader of National Patriotic Party.
