= NTLA =

NTLA can stand for:

- National Transitional Legislative Assembly of Liberia
- Northern Territory Legislative Assembly (Australia)
- National Tax Lien Association
