= Salala =

Salala may refer to:

- Salalah, a city in Oman
- Salala District, in Liberia
- Salala Village, in Jalandhar, India
- Salala, Bong County, Liberia
- Salala, Pakistan, a mountain ridge on the Afghanistan-Pakistan boundary
- Salala (band), an a capella musical trio from southern Madagascar
- Salala, the childhood name of Empress Jitō
