= List of ambassadors of Liberia to the United States =

Coordinates: 38.953214°N 77.035442°W

Ambassador of Liberia to the United States Embassy of Liberia in Washington, D.C.
- Inaugural holder: Charles D. B. King
- Formation: July 25, 1947

The Liberian ambassador in Washington, D. C. is the official representative of the government in Monrovia to the Government of the United States and accredited in Ottawa.

== List of representatives ==
Ambassador	Portrait	Diplomatic agrément	Diplomatic accreditation	Term end	President of Liberia	US president	Notes
Charles D. B. King		July 24, 1947	July 25, 1947	1952	William Tubman	Harry S. Truman	
		May 12, 1949			William Tubman	Harry S. Truman	legation raised to embassy
Charles D. B. King		May 10, 1949	May 12, 1949		William Tubman	Harry S. Truman	
Clarence Lorenzo Simpson		April 25, 1952	May 5, 1952	1956	William Tubman	Harry S. Truman	
George Arthur Padmore		April 2, 1956	April 7, 1956		William Tubman	Dwight D. Eisenhower	
Samuel Edward Peal		October 13, 1961	October 19, 1961	1976	William Tubman	John F. Kennedy	
J. Urias Nelson		June 22, 1976			William R. Tolbert Jr.	Gerald Ford	Chargé d'affaires
Francis A. Dennis, Sr.		July 15, 1976	July 19, 1976	1979	William R. Tolbert Jr.	Gerald Ford	Concurrent assignments: USA and Canada
William V. S. Bull		November 18, 1979			William R. Tolbert Jr.	Jimmy Carter	Chargé d'affaires, Permanent Representative of Liberia to the United Nations
Herbert Richard Wright Brewer		December 12, 1979	January 31, 1980	1980	William R. Tolbert Jr.	Jimmy Carter	
William V. S. Bull		October 27, 1980				Jimmy Carter	Chargé d'affaires
Joseph Saye Guannu		April 14, 1981	June 4, 1981	1983	Samuel Doe	Ronald Reagan	
W. Elwood Greaves		September 30, 1983			Samuel Doe	Ronald Reagan	Chargé d'affaires
George Toe Washington		December 12, 1983	January 9, 1984	1985	Samuel Doe	Ronald Reagan	General
Eugenia A. Wordsworth-Stevenson		October 20, 1986	November 24, 1986	1990	Samuel Doe	Ronald Reagan	
Rachel Gbenyon Diggs		January 7, 1998	March 16, 1998		Charles Taylor	Bill Clinton	
William V. S. Bull		May 19, 2000	June 14, 2000		Charles Taylor	Bill Clinton	
Charles A. Minor		May 21, 2004	July 15, 2004		Gyude Bryant	George W. Bush	
Nathaniel Barnes		September 9, 2008	October 17, 2008	2010	Gyude Bryant	George W. Bush	
Jeremiah Sulunteh		April 25, 2012	May 2, 2012	January 20, 2017	Ellen Johnson Sirleaf	Barack Obama	
Lois Cheche Brutus		November 3, 2017	November 29, 2017	2018	Ellen Johnson Sirleaf	Donald Trump	
George S. W. Patten, Sr.		December 29, 2018	January 11, 2019	January 21, 2024	George Weah	Donald Trump; Joe Biden	

== See also ==
- Embassy of Liberia, Washington, D.C.
- List of diplomatic missions of Liberia
- Foreign relations of Liberia
- President of Liberia
