= Secretary of the Treasury (disambiguation) =

Secretary of the Treasury most commonly refers to the United States Secretary of the Treasury.

Secretary of the Treasury may also refer to:

- Confederate States of America Secretary of the Treasury
- Secretary of the Treasury (Liberia), replaced by the Minister of Finance in 1972
- Secretary to the Treasury (Sri Lanka), an office within the Ministry of Finance, Economic Stabilization and National Policies
- Secretary to the Treasury, one of several positions in the United Kingdom
- Secretary for the Treasury (Hong Kong) (under Financial Secretary)

== See also ==
- Minister of Finance
