= Duside Hospital =

Hospital in Firestone, Margibi, Liberia

Geography
- Location: Firestone District, Margibi County, Liberia
- Coordinates: 6.35000°N 10.46667°W

History
- Founded: 1957

Links
- Other links: List of hospitals in Liberia

Duside Hospital is a hospital in Firestone District, Margibi County, Liberia. It holds 300 beds and is operated by the Firestone Tire and Rubber Company. It reopened in December 2008 and in January 2010, was considered one of the best hospitals in Liberia.

== See also ==
- List of hospitals in Liberia
