= Gbala =

Gbala is a surname. Notable people with the surname include:

- David Gbala, Liberian politician
- Patrick Gbala (born 1993), Ivorian footballer
