= Jeremiah Sulunteh =

Liberian politician

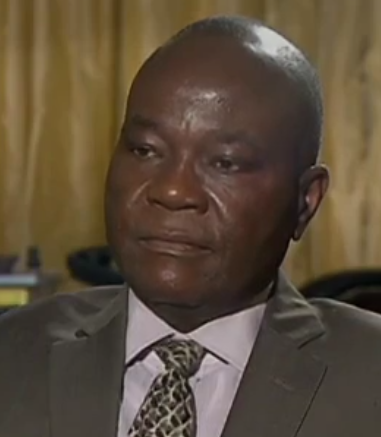

Vice Standard Bearer of the Alternative National Congress Liberia
- Incumbent
- Assumed office 2017

Personal details
- Born: 11 October 1958 (age 68) Gboimu Town, Suacoco, Bong County, Liberia
- Party: ANC
- Spouse: Kabeh Sulunteh
- Children: 3
- Education: Cuttington University (BS); York University (MS); Booker Washington Institute (Diploma); American University in Cairo (MPA)
- Occupation: Professor
- Profession: Economist
- Website: jeremiahsulunteh.com

Jeremiah Congbeh Sulunteh (born October 11, 1962) is the Vice Standard Bearer of Liberia's Alternative National Congress (ANC) political party, and was its vice-presidential candidate for the 2017 Liberian presidential election. Sulunteh's career in the areas of administration, teaching, and politics spans more than 30 years.For more than three decades he has been a politician, administrator and academic. Sulunteh served as the Minister of Transport from 2006 to 2008 under Ellen Johnson Sirleaf, and later as Minister of Posts and Telecommunications from 2008 to 2010, and as Minister of Labour from 2010 to 2012 before his appointment as Ambassador of Liberia to the United States in March 2012.

== Early life and education ==
Jeremiah Sulunteh was born on October 11, 1962, in Gboimu Town, Suacoco, Bong County, Liberia, to Sulunteh Yeibah, a farmer, and his wife, Kanny Bu-Nquoi, now deceased. After completing his secondary education in Suacoco Town, Sulunteh entered the Booker Washington Institute, a vocational school in Kakata, Liberia, where he earned a diploma in Agriculture in 1980. He later earned a B.S. in Economics at Cuttington University in Suacoco in 1988, an M.P.A. at the American University in Cairo, Egypt, in 1994, where his thesis was entitled "The Political Economy of African Development: A Comparative Study of Kenya and Tanzania", and an M.A. in Economics at York University in Toronto, Canada, in 2001, where he taught economics classes and wrote a thesis titled, "Public Sector Deficits and Macroeconomic Performance: Adjustment, Reform and Growth, the Case of Ghana."

== Public service career ==
Sulunteh has worked as a financial aid advisor at York University, as an accounts representative at the Royal Bank of Canada, as project coordinator for the Friends of Liberia, as an administrative assistant to the Vice President for Administration at Cuttington University, and as a field financial analyst for a Bong County, Liberia, Agricultural Development Project. He has taught Public Finance Administration and Administrative Theory and Practice at the University of Liberia, as well as Economic Development at the Graduate School of Cuttington University, where he served as associate vice president for Planning and Development and then as administrator until 2006.

== Political career ==
He is currently the Vice Standard Bearer of Liberia's Alternative National Congress (ANC) political party, and its vice presidential candidate for the 2017 Liberia presidential elections.

In 2005, Sulunteh ran for Liberia's vice-presidency on a ticket with Winston Tubman, but the pair did not survive the first round of balloting, and went on to support the eventual winner, Ellen Johnson Sirleaf. Therefore

== Personal life ==
Sulunteh is married to Sianneh TZ Sulunteh and together they have three children. He speaks and writes Kpelle, his native tongue, which is Liberia's most commonly spoken indigenous language, as well as English, which is the dominant language of government and commerce.
