= Lusinee Kamara =

Liberian politician

Minister of Finance of Liberia
- In office 2003–2006
- Preceded by: Charles R. G. Bright
- Succeeded by: Antoinette Sayeh

Speaker of the Transitional National Assembly of Liberia
- In office 27 February 1997 – July 1997
- Preceded by: Morris Dukuly
- Succeeded by: Nyudueh Morkonmana

Personal details
- Born: 1953-1955 Gbarnga
- Party: All Liberia Coalition Party

Lusinee Kamara is a Liberian politician and businessman, and former Minister of Finance and Speaker of the Transitional National Assembly (TLA).

Kamara was 69 years old in 2023, so he was born about 1953–1955. He was born in Gbarnga, Bong County. He got a Bachelor of Science in economics from University of Liberia in 1980.

During the First Liberian Civil War, Kamara was Minister of Trade and Industry appointed by ULIMO from May 1994 to August 1995, and then Minister of Trade and Industry appointed by ULIMO-K from August 1995 to February 1997. He was the appointed Speaker of the Transitional National Assembly in February 1997 at the end of the First Liberian Civil War. He served as Minister of Finance in the cabinet of Gyude Bryant from 2003 to 2006. He worked as director of The Liberian Bank for Development & Investment and in 2010 served as vice chairman of the Liberia Chambers of Commerce.

In 2020, Kamara succeeded G. V. Kromah as the leader of All Liberia Coalition Party. In 2023, he was a failed candidate in the 2023 presidential elections.
