= Saleeby =

Saleeby is a surname. Notable people with the surname include:

- Caleb Saleeby (1878–1940), English physician, writer, and journalist
- Elias Saleeby, Liberian banker
- Joanna Saleeby, American businesswoman and golfer
- Najeeb Mitry Saleeby (1870–1935), Lebanese-American physician

== See also ==
- Saleby
