= Benjamin Freeman =

Benjamin Freeman may refer to:

- Ben Freeman (born 1980), British actor, best known for his role in Emmerdale
- Benjamin Green Freeman, Liberian politician

== See also ==
- Benjamin H. Freedman (1890–1984), American businessman and activist
- Benjamin Friedman (disambiguation)
