= Farm Builders =

Social enterprise in Liberia

Farm Builders is a social enterprise in Liberia, which works to build smallholder farms. Farm Builders is headquartered in the Kakata District, Liberia. They have received awards for social innovations from Echoing Green and the Mulago Foundation.

== Services ==
Farm Builders helps farmers in Liberia by rejuvenating old rubber farms destroyed or damaged during the Second Liberian Civil War. They also provide management and financing services for farm owners to rebuild their plantations and to encourage the development of food and cash crops on existing plots of land, with the goal of ensuring food and income security for farmers. Farm Builders also works in partnership with Buchanan Renewables, a clean biomass energy company, which uses wood from redundant rubber trees for power generation.

In partnership with a native Liberian rubber producer, Morris Rubber, a Liberian vocational training centre, Farm Builders aims to train farmers both to grow rubber, and to become "agro-preneurs" capable of creating successful farm businesses.

Farm Builders helps smallholders access new markets, including export markets by expanding via their agroforestry model, in which land and clearing costs are low because they are shared between multiple crops. These low costs complement Liberia's other advantages in the rubber market, which include a good growth climate and proximity to Western markets.
