= Nathaniel Barnes =

Liberian diplomat (born 1954)

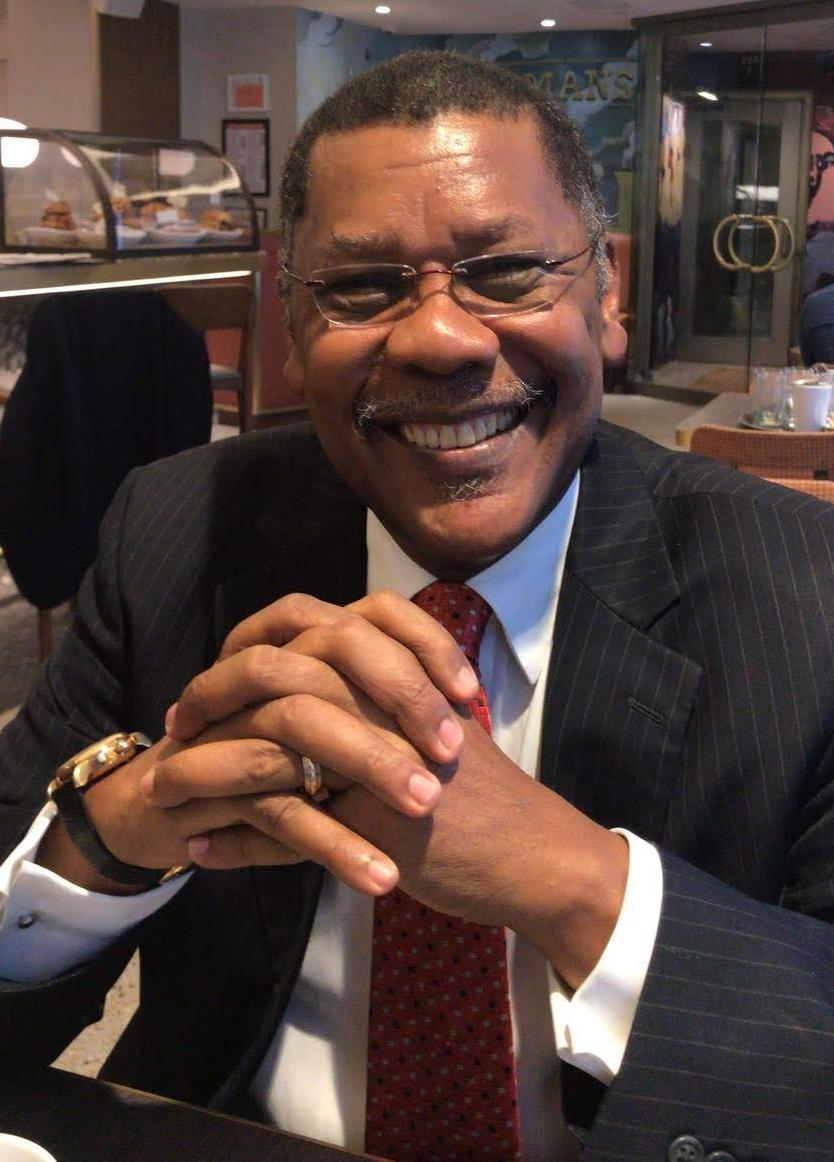
- Barnes in 2021

Minister of Finance
- In office 1999–2002
- President: Charles Taylor
- Preceded by: John G. Bestman
- Succeeded by: Charles R. G. Bright

Liberian Ambassador to the United States
- In office 9 September 2008 – 2010
- President: Ellen Johnson Sirleaf
- Preceded by: Charles A. Minor
- Succeeded by: Jeremiah Sulunteh

Personal details
- Born: 6 April 1954 (age 72) Monrovia, Liberia
- Party: Independent
- Other political affiliations: Liberia Destiny Party; Free Democratic Party
- Spouse: Dr. Dawn Cooper Barnes
- Children: 6
- Education: Rider University, B.SC., Pace University, MBA
- Website: Official website

Milton Nathaniel Barnes (born 1954) is a Liberian diplomat, politician and member of the Liberian Destiny Party (LDP). In early 2022, he announced his intention to run as an independent candidate in the 2023 Liberian presidential election.

== Early life ==
Barnes was born in Monrovia, Liberia, to Roland T. and Eudora N. Barnes. He was the second of four children. Barnes spent his formative years in Harper and Monrovia.

He graduated from high school at the College of West Africa before spending a term at the University of Liberia. He worked as an intern in Liberia's banking system before eventually going to the United States for college.

Barnes attended Rider University (then Rider College) in Lawrenceville, New Jersey, in 1975 where in majored in Finance and graduated in 1978 with a B.Sc. degree. In 1979, Barnes graduated with an MBA in Finance and Banking from Pace University in New York City.

== Political career ==
In September 1999, Barnes was appointed to the position of Minister of Finance, Republic of Liberia. In that capacity, he became the chief architect of Liberia's fiscal program and oversaw and implemented a new national tax code in consultation with the Fiscal Affairs Department of the International Monetary Fund. He held this position until mid-2002.

In January 2004, Barnes founded a new political party, the Liberia Destiny Party (LDP). Running as the LDP presidential candidate in the 2005 Liberian presidential general election, Barnes placed 12th out of 22 candidates, receiving 1.0% of the vote. He eventually supported Ellen Johnson Sirleaf, who would become the first democratically elected female president of an African nation, during the subsequent runoff election.

From May 2006 to 2008, Barnes was appointed Permanent Representative to the United Nations from the Republic of Liberia.

Barnes served as Ambassador from the Republic of Liberia to the Republic of Cuba from 2006 -2008 while also serving as Ambassador to the United Nations. He was instrumental in re-establishing and solidifying diplomatic relations with Cuba.

In 2008, President Johnson Sirleaf named Ambassador Milton Nathaniel Barnes as Liberia's new Ambassador Extraordinary and Plenipotentiary to the United States of America. He served in this capacity until 2010.

In December 2010, Barnes expressed interest in contesting the presidency again in the 2011 election. In July 2011, he explained the LDP would not be contesting the presidency.

By May 2014, the National Elections Commission filed a petition to decertify the LDP. Instead of challenging his party's decertification, Barnes joined the Free Democratic Party, a constituent party of the National Democratic Coalition, by October 2015.

In January 2022, Barnes announced his intention to contest the upcoming 2023 Liberian presidential election as an independent candidate on a platform of "Reconciliation, Positive Change, Self-Reliance, and the Emergence of a New Breed of Liberian Leaders who exhibit the key qualities of Character, Competence and Courage."

== Honors ==
In May 2009, Dr. Mordechai Rozanski, president of Rider University, conferred on Barnes an honorary Doctorate of Laws degree.

== Personal life ==
Barnes is married to Dawn Cooper Barnes, a daughter of Henry Nehemiah Cooper, M.D. (1927–1984) and Izetta Cooper, co-founders of the former Cooper Clinic in Monrovia. The two grew up in the same Monrovia community where Barnes' mother was a teacher at Dawn's elementary school and Dawn's father was the Barnes' family doctor. Dawn Barnes has written, directed and produced the films: Cry of the Pepperbird: A Story of Liberia (2000), The Spiritual Nature of African Dance (2001) and Children of Gold (2002). She also produced a Liberian television comedy series entitled WE ON IT! (2001–2003). The couple have six children.

In 2010, Barnes founded consulting firm Aurora Solutions, Inc. Since 2010, he has also served regularly as a lecturer at the Graduate Schools of the University of Liberia and African Methodist Episcopal University.

He enjoys abstract painting. In 2020, his artistic creations were published in Left Brain Right Brain: Thoughts and Musings of a Servant (ISBN 978-0993571039).
