= Charles A. Minor =

Liberian diplomat (born 1942)

Liberian Ambassador to the United States
- In office May 21, 2004 – 2008
- President: Gyude Bryant; Ellen Johnson Sirleaf
- Preceded by: William V. S. Bull
- Succeeded by: Nathaniel Barnes

Personal details
- Born: July 3, 1942 (age 84) Sinoe County, Liberia
- Education: College of West Africa; University of Liberia

Charles A. Minor (born July 3, 1942) is a former Liberian ambassador to the United States.

== Early life ==
Charles A. Minor was born on July 3, 1942, in Sinoe County, Liberia. He was born to a Methodist pastor, E. B. Minor. Charles briefly attended the Booker Washington Institute. Later, he attended the College of West Africa, where he earned a high school diploma. He then graduated from the University of Liberia, and went on to pursue education in management and finance in the United States of America. As a student, he was involved with youth and religious organizations such as the Methodist Youth Fellowship in Sinoe County and later in Monrovia, the National Student Christian Council in which he general secretary, and the National Youth Council in which he was president.

== Career ==
Minor worked with the consulting firm Arthur D. Little. He later started his own consultancy in Accra named Consultant Management Enterprise. For ten years, Minor worked as the Human Resource and Management Development Director of the African Management Services Company in the Netherlands. Minor helped establish the Afriland First Bank in Liberia.

On May 21, 2004, Minor was appointed as the ambassador to the United States by Transitional Government Chairman Gyude Bryant. On June 15, 2004, Minor presented his credentials to President George W. Bush. When President Ellen Johnson Sirleaf became president, she kept Minor as ambassador for two years, before appointing Nathaniel Barnes in 2008.

On June 20, 2015, the Minor family started to erect a library and multipurpose building for J. J. Roberts Elementary School in Grand Cape Mount County. On June 21, 2015, Minor was crowned Father of the Year by one of Liberia's oldest churches, the First United Methodist Church. President Sirleaf attended the crowning ceremony. On July 26, 2015, Minor served as Independence Day orator in Greenville.

As of 2015, Minor was Chairman of the Board of Tax Appeals.

In June 2024, Minor was appointed by President Joseph Boakai as chair of the Rice Committee, a committee created to stabilize the price of rice in Liberia.

== Personal life ==
On July 18, 1970, Minor married Comfort in the First United Methodist Church. Together, they have three children.
