= Margibi-5 =

Electoral district in Liberia

- Constituency for the House of Representatives of Liberia
- Electorate: 29,961 (2023)

Current constituency
- Representative: Clarence G. Gahr

Margibi-5 is an electoral district for the elections to the House of Representatives of Liberia. It is located in a north-eastern portion of Margibi County, bordering Grand Bassa and Bong counties.

== Elected representatives ==
Year	Representative elected	Party	Notes
2011	Emmanuel J. Nuquay	UP	
2017	Clarence G. Gahr	CDC	
2023	Clarence G. Gahr	CDC	

== Election results ==
2011 Margibi County's 5th House District Election
Candidate	Party	Votes	%
Emmanuel J. Nuquay	Unity Party	7,145	48.93
Charles D. Bennie	Liberty Party	3,043	20.84
Joseph Kollie Marshall	National Union for Democratic Progress	1,901	13.02
Cyril A. Allen	National Patriotic Party	1,335	9.14
James S. Kennie II	National Democratic Coalition	700	4.79
Harris Nyuyeah Sewor	Citizens Unification Party	479	3.28
Total		14,603	100.00
Valid votes		14,603	92.53
Invalid/blank votes		1,179	7.47
Total votes		15,782	100.00

2017 Margibi County's 5th House District Election
Candidate	Party	Votes	%
Clarence G. Gahr	Coalition for Democratic Change	6,001	33.72
Alexander B. Charlie Jr.	People's Unification Party	5,627	31.62
Anthony Moses	All Liberian Party	2,439	13.71
Joseph Kollie Marshall	Liberty Party	1,560	8.77
Joseph S. S. Gwee	Coalition for Liberia's Progress	729	4.10
Emmanuel J. Gelescia	United People's Party	702	3.94
Amos Kollie Nammah	Alternative National Congress	479	2.69
Harris T. David	Democratic Justice Party	258	1.45
Total		17,795	100.00
Valid votes		17,795	93.70
Invalid/blank votes		1,196	6.30
Total votes		18,991	100.00
