= Boima Kamara =

Liberian economist and politician

Minister of Finance of Liberia
- In office January 2024 – July 2024
- President: Joseph Boakai
- Preceded by: Samuel D. Tweah
- Succeeded by: Anthony Myers
- In office 13 May 2016 – January 2018
- President: Ellen Johnson Sirleaf
- Preceded by: Amara Konneh
- Succeeded by: Samuel D. Tweah

Personal details
- Born: Bomi County

Boima Kamara is a Liberian politician. He was appointed as minister of finance in January 2024 by President Joseph Boakai. He resigned in July 2024.-

Kamara previously served as minister of finance from April 2016 to 2018. He was appointed by Ellen Johnson Sirleaf.

Kamara was born in Bomi County, Western Liberia. He is an economist and graduated from University of Liberia. Before 2016, he served as the deputy governor of the Central Bank of Liberia.
