= Ministry of Finance (Liberia) =

Government ministry of Liberia

The Ministry of Finance is a government ministry of the Republic of Liberia. As of 2024, the Liberian Finance Minister is Augustine Kpehe Ngafuan, who was confirmed in September 2024. The minister is appointed by the President of Liberia, with the consent of Senate of Liberia.

The ministry's offices are located in Broad & Mechlin Street in Monrovia.

The ministry was led by a secretary of the treasury before 1972, and since 1972 by the minister of finance.

== Secretaries of the Treasury ==
- John N. Lewis, 1848-?
- John H. Chavers, ?-?
- Stephen Allen Benson, ?-1856
- B. J. K. Anderson, 1863-?
- William Highland Lynch, ?-1864
- Daniel Bashiel Warner, 1864-1866
- John C. Chavers, 1866-?
- Edward J. Roye, ?-?
- Frederick Keith Hyde, ?-1868
- Daniel Beams, 1868-1869
- B. V. R. James 1869
- B. J. K. Anderson, 1870
- John F. Dennis, 1870-1871
- Edward Farrow Roye, 1871-?
- Henry W. Dennis, 1874-1876
- James T. Wiles, 1876
- John R. Freeman, 1876
- B. J. K. Anderson, 1876-1878
- William H. Roe, 1878-1883
- Moore T. Worrell, 1883-1892
- Arthur Barclay, 1896–1903
- Daniel Edward Howard, 1904-1912
- Thomas W. Haynes, 1912
- John L. Morris, 1912-1914-?
- James F. Cooper, 1915-1917
- Walter F. Walker, 1917-1920
- J. Jeremiah Harris, 1920-1926-?
- A. W. Melon, ?-1927-?
- Samuel George Harmon, 1928-?
- James F. Cooper, 1930
- John L. Morris, 1930-?
- Dixon Byrd Brown, 1932-1933
- Gabriel Lafayette Dennis, 1933-1940
- William E. Dennis, 1944-1958
- Charles Dunbar Sherman, 1958-1968
- James Milton Weeks, 1968-1971
- James Milton Weeks, 1971-1972

== Ministers of Finance ==
- Stephen A. Tolbert, 1972-1975
- Edwin Williams, 1975-1976
- James T. Phillips, 1976-1979
- Ellen Johnson Sirleaf, 1979-1980
- Perry G. Zulu, 1980-1981
- George K. Dunye, 1981
- G. Alvin Jones, 1981-1986
- Robert C. Tubman, 1986-1987
- John G. Bestman, 1987-1988
- David Farhat, 1988-1989
- Emmanuel Shaw, 1989-1990
- Ellen Johnson Sirleaf, 1990
- Stephen Byron Tarr, January - November 1991
- Francis C. Karpeh, June 1991 - March 1994
- Wilson Tarpeh, May 1994- August 1995
- Lansana Kromah, September 1995 - August 1997
- Elias Saleeby, August 1997-1999
- John G. Bestman, 1999
- Milton Nathaniel Barnes, 1999-2002
- Charles Bright, 2002-2003
- Lusine Kamara, 2003-2006
- Antoinette Sayeh, 2006-2008
- Augustine Kpehe Ngafuan, 2008-2012
- Amara Konneh, 2012-2016
- Boima Kamara, 2016-2018
- Samuel D. Tweah, 2018-2024
- Boima Kamara, 2024
- Anthony Myers, acting, 2024
- Augustine Kpehe Ngafuan 2024–present

== See also ==
- Central Bank of Liberia
