= John G. Bestman =

Liberian politician (1939–2021)

Minister of Finance
- In office 1987–1988
- President: Samuel Doe
- Preceded by: Robert C. Tubman
- Succeeded by: David Farhat
- In office February 1999 – 1999
- President: Charles Taylor
- Preceded by: Elias Saleeby
- Succeeded by: Milton Nathaniel Barnes

Personal details
- Born: 1 December 1939 Marshall, Margibi County, Liberia
- Died: 27 June 2021 (aged 81) Monrovia, Montserrado County, Liberia

John G. Bestman (December 1, 1939 – 27 June 2021) was a Liberian politician and administrator who twice served as Minister of Finance, from 1987 to 1988 and again in 1999. He also served as minister of telecommunication and postage as well as governor of the Central Bank of Liberia. In 2005, Bestman managed Ellen Johnson Sirleaf's success presidential campaign, which saw her become the first African female president. Bestman also was a member of the board of the Central Bank and adviser to the president.

Bestman died on 27 June 2021 at ELWA Hospital in Monrovia. He was survived by several children.
