= Darawan =

- Village
- Location in Punjab, India Darawan (India)
- Coordinates: 31.49374°N 75.67659°E
- Country: India
- State: Punjab
- District: Jalandhar

Population
  - Total: 881

Languages
  - Official: Punjabi
- Time zone: UTC+5:30 (IST)
- PIN: 144102

Darawan is a village in Bhogpur. Bhogpur is a city in the district Jalandhar of Indian state of Punjab.

== About ==
Darawan lies on the Bhogpur-Adampur road which is almost 3 km from it. The nearest railway station to Darawan is Adampur railway station at a distance of 8.5 km.

== Post code ==
Darawan's Post office is Salala whose post code is 144102.
