= Emmanuel Shaw =

Liberian politician

Minister of Finance
- In office 1989–1990
- President: Samuel Doe
- Preceded by: David Farhat
- Succeeded by: Ellen Johnson Sirleaf

Personal details
- Born: 26 July 1946 (age 79)

Emmanuel Shaw II (born 26 July 1946) is the former Minister of Finance of Liberia who served from 1989 to 1990. He is the co-founder of Lonestar MTN Liberia. He was an advisor of President Charles Taylor.
