= Samuel Tweah =

Liberian politician

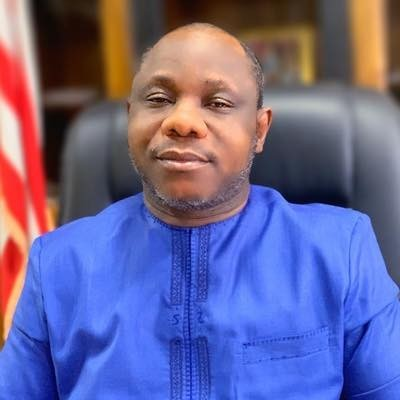

Minister of Finance of Liberia
- In office January 2018 – January 2024
- President: George Weah
- Preceded by: Boima Kamara
- Succeeded by: Boima Kamara

Personal details
- Born: Samuel D. Tweah Jr. 6 May 1971 (age 54) Maryland County, Liberia
- Spouse: Delecia Berry Tweah

Samuel D. Tweah is a Liberian politician. He was appointed as minister of finance in January 2018 by President George Weah.

He was born on 6 May 1971 in Maryland County. He has an economics degree from George Washington University.

On 11 December 2023, the U.S. State Department publicly designated Tweah and two members of the Senate of Liberia as pursuant to Section 7031(c) of the Department of State, Foreign Operations, and Related Programs Appropriations Act, 2023, for "involvement in significant corruption by abusing their public positions through soliciting, accepting, and offering bribes to manipulate legislative processes and public funding, including legislative reporting and mining sector activity."
