= Elias Saleeby =

Liberian politician

Minister of Finance
- In office 1997 – February 1999
- President: Charles Taylor
- Preceded by: Lansana Kromah
- Succeeded by: John G. Bestman

Elias E. Saleeby is a retired Liberian banker.

== Early life ==
He obtained his BS in Accounting from the University of Dayton in Ohio, USA. Then he earned his MBA, specializing in Finance, from Xavier University in Cincinnati. Later he completed his DBA in Finance & Economics from Kent State University. His doctoral dissertation focused on the role of central banks in developing countries.

== Professional career ==
Saleeby worked as a business analyst at the world headquarters of Xerox for about two years before briefly joining the World Bank. Saleeby returned to Liberia in 1973 at the request of former Liberian president William R. Tolbert Jr., and former Minister of Finance Steve Tolbert, to head the Liberian Bank for Development and Investment (LBDI). The LBDI was created by an Act of the National Legislature in 1961 under the joint initiative of major international financial institutions that purchased equity in the Bank. It commenced operations in 1965. In 1974 the name was changed to the Liberian Bank for Development and Investment (LBDI). Elie Saleeby made history by becoming LBDI's youngest President and CEO at the age of 31. He returned to the World Bank in 1980, holding a variety of positions until 1997 and specializing in financial sector reforms.

== Public service ==
He held the position of Minister of Finance from 1997 to February 1999. He held the position of Executive Governor of the Central Bank of Liberia from 1999 until his resignation in 2004.
