= Kakata =

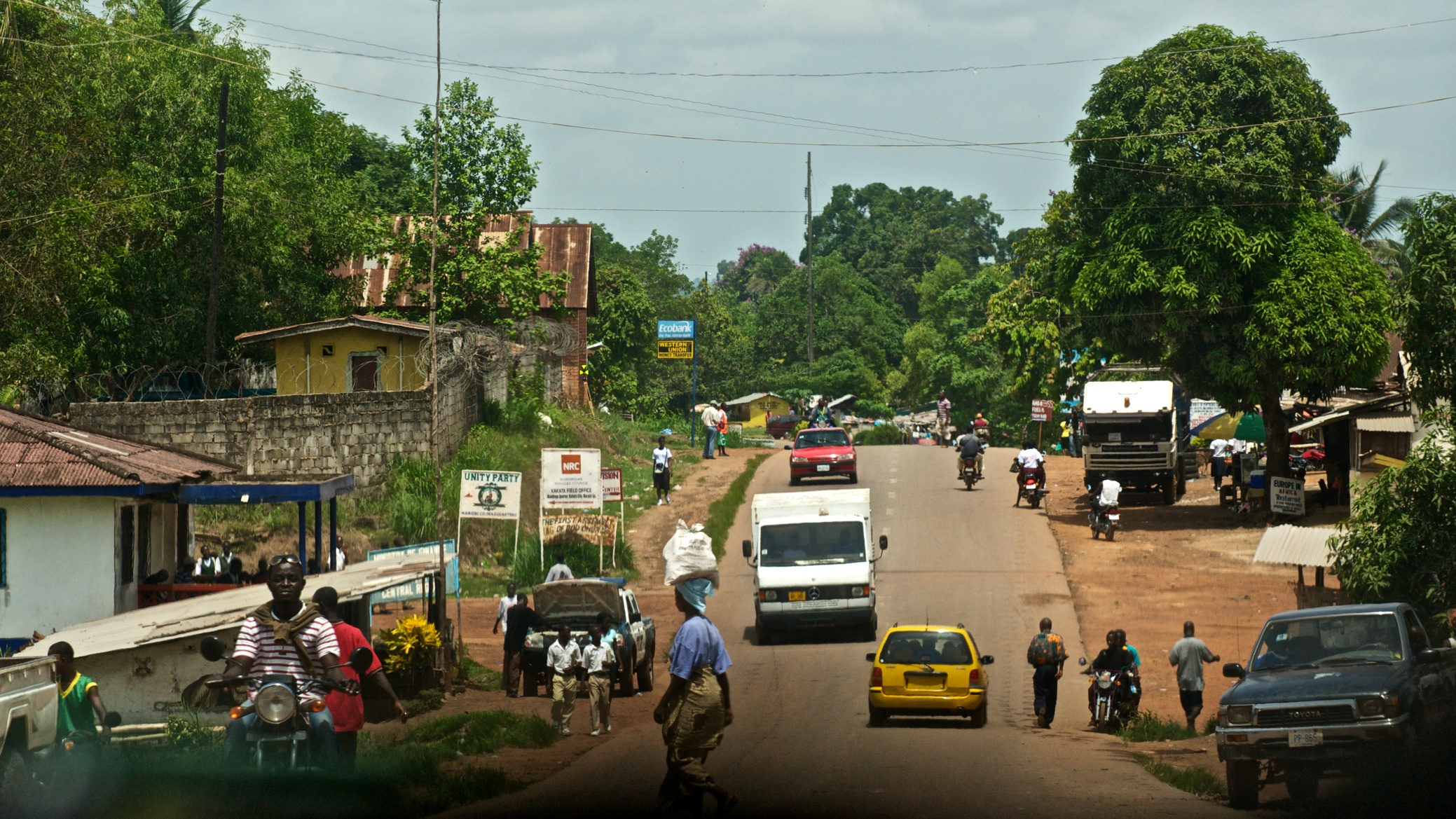

- Location in Liberia
- Coordinates: 6°31′48″N 10°21′6″W
- Country: Liberia
- County: Margibi County

Population (2008 census)
  - Total: 33,945
- Climate: Am

Kakata is the capital city of Liberia's Margibi County. Located in Kakata District, its proximity to the Du River bridge also comprises its border with Todee District. It is a transit town at the heart of the historical natural rubber cultivation belt in Liberia. The city is colloquially known as "Kak City".

== Geography ==
The city is connected by the paved highway from Monrovia via Paynesville, and to Firestone Natural Rubber Company's plantation in Harbel, Liberia in the south by a dirt dusty road 26th Gate road, and by the paved 15th Gate plantation road in Careysburg, Liberia. It is also connected to Bong Town, Liberia to the north by a partially paved road, by the dusty Borlala road, to Gibi mountain and Gibi District in the east. Finally the paved Monrovia highway continues northeast to Salala, Liberia and Gbarnga.

== Demographics ==
As of the 2008 census, Kakata has a population of 33,945. Of this, 16,501 were male and 17,444 female. It is the fifth most populous urban area in Liberia.

== Economy ==
It is estimated that the city is surrounded by more than one hundred thousand acres of rubber plantations, most of which are now past latex production. Though the Salala Rubber Company and Firestone Liberia are not far from Kakata, the nearby rubber plantations are mostly privately owned. Morris American Rubber Company (MARCO) and Bright Farm are the two largest plantations by area around Kakata. Small and medium rubber plantations also dot most of the landscape.

Kakata has a large daily market in the center of town.

== Education ==
Kakata has many primary and secondary schools. One of the most notable is Booker Washington Institute (BWI), Liberia's premier vocational high school and technical institution. It also hosts Kakata Rural Teacher Training Institute, which trains Liberian elementary, lower-grade and secondary teachers.

== Healthcare ==
C. H. Rennie Hospital in Kakata is the only government referral hospital in the County and it is the headquarters for the Margibi County health team. The Firestone Duside Hospital in Harbel is the nearest referral health care facility.

== Media ==
Radio is one of the main source of news and community engagement. The prominent stations broadcasting in Kakata are:

- Radio Kakata FM 101.7 MHz
- Atlantic Radio FM 92.7 MHz
- Radio Margibi FM 103.9 MHz
- The BBC World Service IS FM 103.0 MHz
- ELBC FM 99.9 MHz
- Radio Joy Africa FM 97.5 MHz
- Hope Communication Inc. FM 94.9 MHz
- Classic FM 93.5 MHz

== See also ==
- List of schools in Liberia
