= Richard Koon =

Liberian politician

Richard Nagbe Koon

Speaker of the House of Representatives of Liberia
- Incumbent
- Assumed office 21 November 2024
- Preceded by: Jonathan F. Koffa

Personal details
- Born: 27 July 1970 (age 55) Monrovia, Liberia
- Party: Unity Party

Richard Nagbe Koon is a Liberian politician. He has served as Speaker of the House of Representatives of Liberia since 21 November 2024. Koon was first elected speaker by the House on 21 November 2024, and he would serve in that position following his election. However the Supreme Court ruled his leadership to be illegal. Former Speaker Jonathan F. Koffa resigned on 12 May 2025. Following Koffa's resignation, Koon was legitimately elected speaker on 13 May.

Koon was born on 27 July 1970 in Monrovia, Liberia, to a Liberian father and a Nigerian mother. He moved to Monrovia in 1992. He studied in Grand Canyon University. He has MBA degrees in accounting both from Cuttington University Graduate School in Monrovia, and from Grand Canyon University. He worked as a professor at the University of Liberia's graduate school.

Koon unsuccessfully ran as an independent for the House of Representatives in the 2011 election. Koon was first elected represent Montserrado County's 11th House district with the in the elections of 2017. He was a co-chair of the Unity Party caucus. He was elected Speaker of the House of Representatives on 21 November 2024.
