= Benjamin Friedman =

Benny or Benjamin Friedman may refer to:

- Benny Friedman (1905–1982), American football quarterback
- Benjamin M. Friedman (born 1944), American political economist
- Benny Friedman (singer) (born 1984), American Hasidic Jewish Orthodox pop vocalist

== See also ==
- Benjamin H. Freedman (1890–1984), American businessman, Holocaust denier and anti-Zionist
- Benjamin Freeman (disambiguation)
