= Margibi-1 =

Electoral district in Liberia

- Constituency for the House of Representatives of Liberia
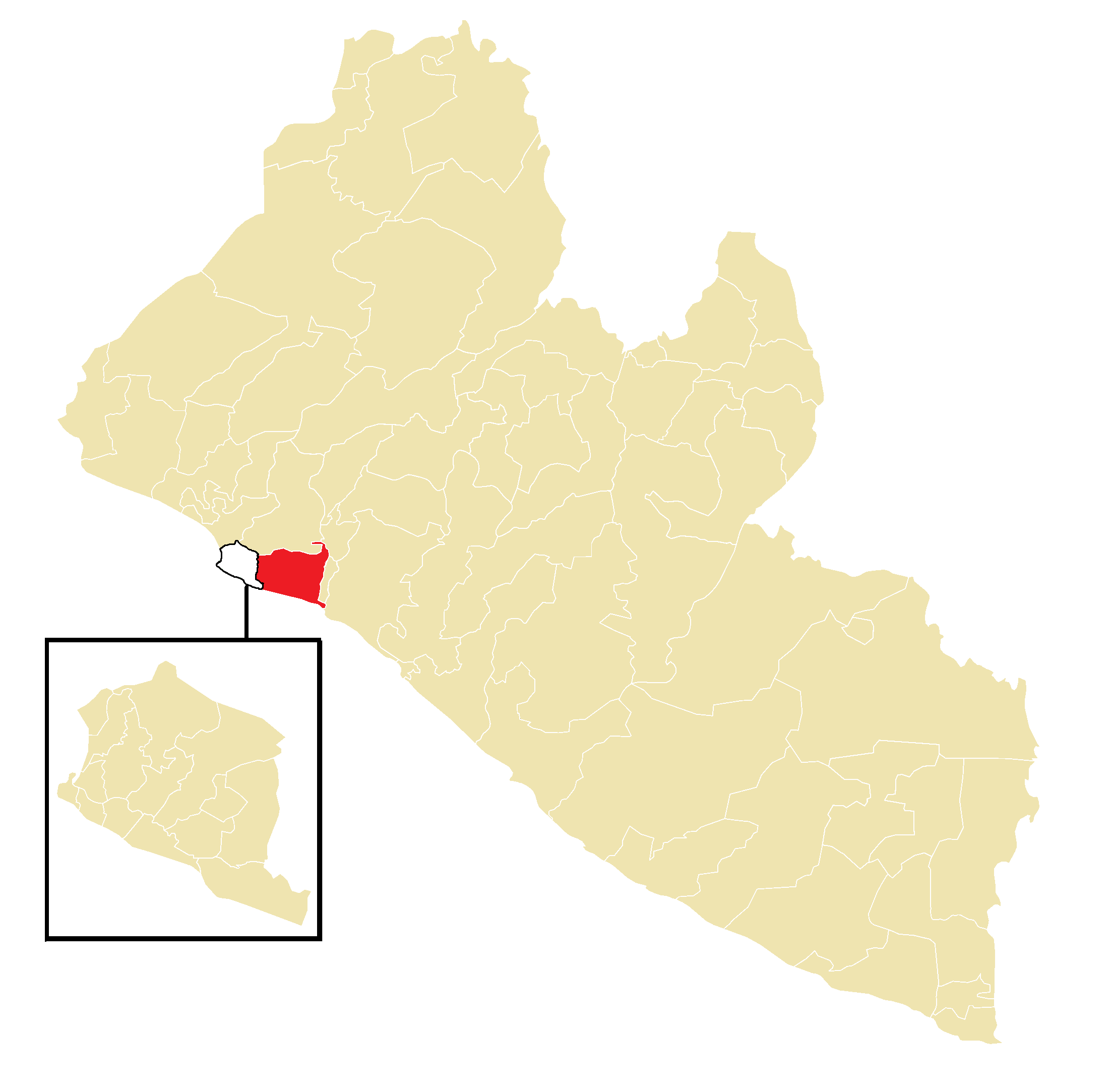
- Electorate: 62,849 (2023)

Current constituency
- Created: 2011
- Representative: Roland O. Cooper

Margibi-1 is an electoral district for the elections to the House of Representatives of Liberia. The constituency covers Marshall city as well as eight communities of Mamabah-Kaba District; Loongaye, Karfeah, Garneo, Zoeduehn, Whowein, Scheiffelin Central, Lloydsville Central and Garmaymu.

== Elected representatives ==
Year	Representative elected	Party	Notes
2005	Emmanuel J. Nuquay	IND	
2011	Roland O. Cooper	LP	
2017	Tibelrosa Tarponweh	CDC	
2023	Roland O. Cooper	IND	

== Election results ==
2005 Margibi County's 1st House District Election
Candidate	Party	Votes	%
Emmanuel J. Nuquay	Independent	5,794	35.88
Dao Ansu Sonii	Coalition for the Transformation of Liberia	3,912	24.22
Nyumah Tamba Cembianor	Congress for Democratic Change	1,936	11.99
Joseph Saah Cooper	National Patriotic Party	1,795	11.11
Henry B. Loryee	Liberty Party	1,189	7.36
Sansee Karpeh Fofanah	Unity Party	1,117	6.92
Tejan Cheik Sheriff	National Reformation Party	407	2.52
Total		16,150	100.00
Valid votes		16,150	91.67
Invalid/blank votes		1,467	8.33
Total votes		17,617	100.00

2011 Margibi County's 1st House District Election
Candidate	Party	Votes	%
Roland O. Cooper	Liberty Party	6,383	41.72
William Garway Sharpe	Unity Party	3,514	22.97
Saah Richard Gbollie	National Patriotic Party	3,082	20.15
Duncan Baccus Gboe	National Democratic Coalition	1,361	8.90
Bestus Peter Davis	Liberia Transformation Party	700	4.58
Michael Vacanarat Giah	National Union for Democratic Progress	258	1.69
Total		15,298	100.00
Valid votes		15,298	93.31
Invalid/blank votes		1,097	6.69
Total votes		16,395	100.00

2017 Margibi County's 1st House District Election
Candidate	Party	Votes	%
Tibelrosa Tarponweh	Coalition for Democratic Change	6,279	23.92
Roland O. Cooper (Incumbent)	People's Unification Party	4,145	15.79
Augustine Fayiah	Liberia Transformation Party	2,846	10.84
J. Stanley Nyumah	Grassroot Democratic Party of Liberia	2,407	9.17
T. Maxwell Grigsby II	Liberty Party	1,394	5.31
Isaac Konah Zangar	Democratic Justice Party	1,081	4.12
David Karnga	Movement for Progressive Change	1,049	4.00
Ida Pratt Deddeh	Alternative National Congress	962	3.66
Arthur Dee Whenyou	Movement for Economic Empowerment	911	3.47
Florence F. Harris	Movement for Democracy and Reconstruction	815	3.10
Henry Smith	Independent	803	3.06
Dobli Zulo Barclay	All Liberian Party	729	2.78
Edward McCauley	Liberia Restoration Party	467	1.78
Diana King C. Harris	Coalition for Liberia's Progress	437	1.66
Martha Tyla Sinoe	Liberian People's Party	429	1.63
Abraham B. Y. J. Garneo	United People's Party	333	1.27
Power Isaac Gibson	Independent	309	1.18
Gertrude Francis DeShield	Independent	255	0.97
Michael V. Giah	Change Democratic Action	225	0.86
P. Sayon Menyon	True Whig Party	202	0.77
Emmanuel S. F. Bumie	Vision for Liberia Transformation	176	0.67
Total		26,254	100.00
Valid votes		26,254	92.15
Invalid/blank votes		2,238	7.85
Total votes		28,492	100.00
