= Emmanuel J. Nuquay =

Liberian politician

Member of the Senate of Liberia from Margibi County
- Incumbent
- Assumed office 2021
- Preceded by: Oscar A. Cooper

Speaker of the House of Representatives of Liberia
- In office October 2016 – 15 January 2018
- Preceded by: Alex J. Tyler
- Succeeded by: Bhofal Chambers

Member of the House of Representatives of Liberia
- In office 2006–2018
- Succeeded by: Clarence G. Gahr
- Constituency: Margibi-1 (2006-2012); Margibi-5 (2012-2018)

Personal details
- Party: People's Unification Party
- Other political affiliations: Unity Party

Emmanuel James Nuquay (Note: His name is also often printed as "James Emmanuel Nuquay" or "J. Emmanuel Nuquay".) is a Liberian politician. He currently serves as a senator from Margibi County.

== Biography ==
Nuquay began serving in the Liberian House of Representatives in 2006. He was elected to represent Margibi County's 1st House district in the 2005 election. In the 2011, he was elected to represent the Margibi's 5th House district. Prior to this, Nuquay was an economist. By 2012, Nuquay served as the chair of the Ways, Means and Finance Committee, as well as a member of the following committees: Judiciary, Agriculture, Forestry and Fisheries, Human and Civil Rights, and Joint Legislative Modernization. In 2014, Nuquay became a founding member of the People's Unification Party (PUP). From October 2016 to 15 January 2018 Nuquay served as speaker of the House of Representatives of Liberia.

Nuquay's term in the House expired in 2018. Instead of seeking re-election in 2017, Nuquay served as the running mate for Vice President Joseph Boakai, who was running in the 2017 presidential election as the Unity Party nominee. Boakai was defeated by Coalition for Democratic Change nominee George Weah. In 2018, President Weah appointed Nuquay as Director General of the Liberia Civil Aviation Authority. In 2020, Nuquay resigned from the Unity Party, rejoining the PUP. He also resigned as Director General of the Liberia Civil Aviation Authority. The same year, Nuquay ran for the Liberian Senate under the PUP banner, winning the Margibi seat.

On 12 December 2023, the United States Department of State imposed a travel ban on Nuquay due to allegations of corruption. Nuquay attempted to have the ban lifted temporarily to allow him to attend United Nations meetings, but Judge Andrew L. Carter Jr. dismissed his case in March 2025.
