= Antoinette Sayeh =

Liberian politician

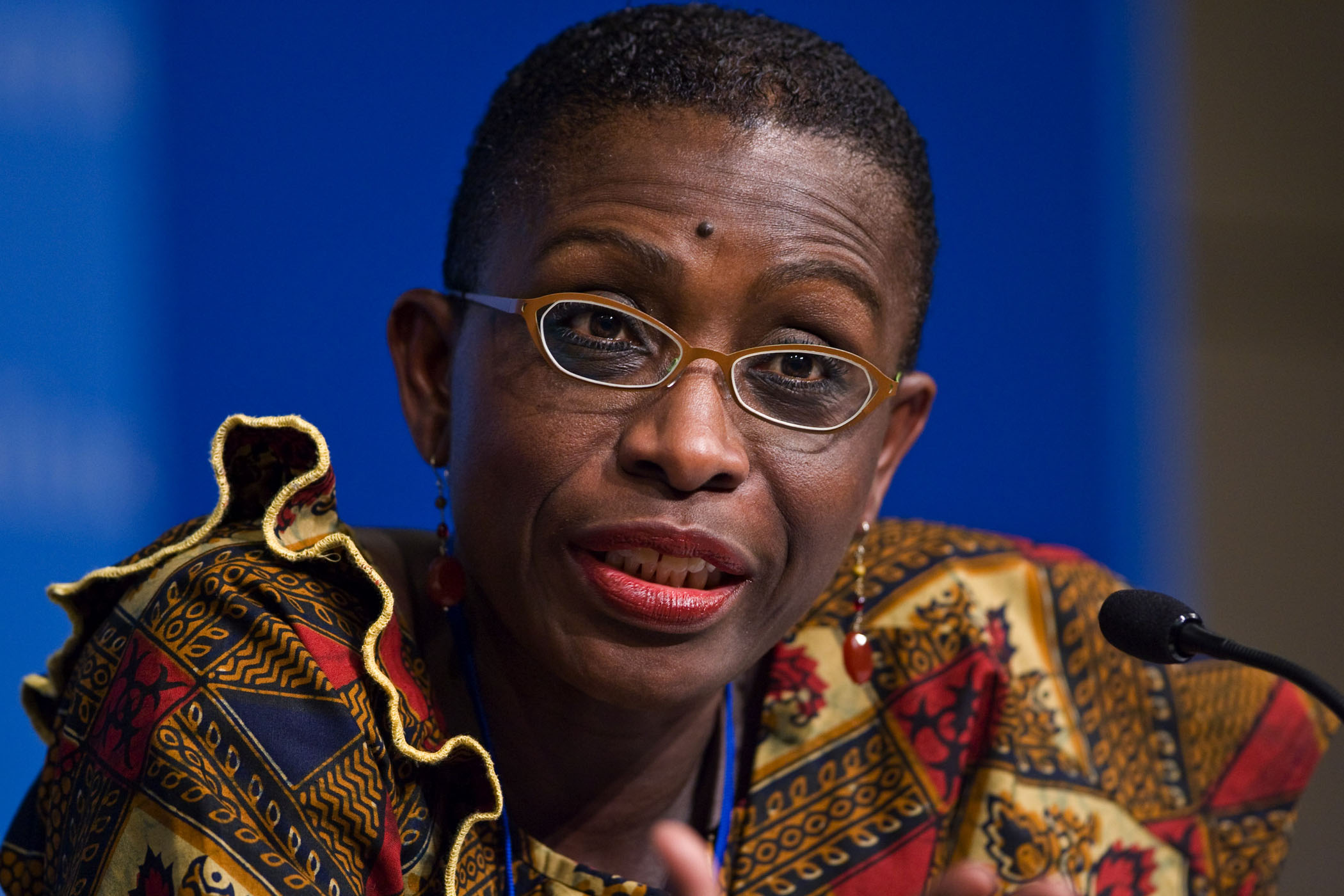

Deputy Managing Director of the International Monetary Fund
- Incumbent
- Assumed office 16 March 2020

Minister of Finance
- In office 2006–2008
- President: Ellen Johnson Sirleaf
- Preceded by: Lusine Kamara
- Succeeded by: Augustine Kpehe Ngafuan

Personal details
- Born: 12 July 1958 (age 68) Monrovia, Liberia
- Education: Swarthmore College; The Fletcher School of Law and Diplomacy
- Occupation: Economist

Antoinette Monsio Sayeh (born 12 July 1958) in Monrovia, Liberia is a Liberian economist. She was the Deputy Managing Director of the International Monetary Fund (IMF) until 2024. Sayeh served as the director of the African Department at the IMF from July 14, 2008, to August 31, 2016. She also was a Distinguished Visiting Fellow at the Center for Global Development.

== Life ==
Sayeh is a graduate of Swarthmore College and The Fletcher School of Law and Diplomacy, where she received her MA and Ph.D. in International Economic Relations. Sayeh has also worked for the World Bank as country director for Benin, Niger, and Togo and worked on public finance management and civil service reform in Pakistan. According to the BBC, Sayeh "delighted international financial institutions" as Liberia's Minister of Finance.

Prior to her term at the IMF, she served from 2006 to 2008 as Minister of Finance in the cabinet of Liberian president Ellen Johnson Sirleaf. Sayeh was the second woman in Liberia's history to hold that position, the first being Ellen Johnson Sirleaf. She said her main tasks were reducing the high national debt, organising the state banking and financial system, and fighting corruption.

From 2007, Sayeh was a member of the World Bank Group’s High Level Advisory Council on Women's Economic Empowerment, which was chaired by Danny Leipziger and Heidemarie Wieczorek-Zeul.

During the legislative period, Antoinette Sayeh moved to the management of the International Monetary Fund (IMF) as Director of the Africa Department in July 2008; in this role, she is now one of the most influential African politicians in the world.

In May 2018, she was appointed to be a member of the Swartmore College Board of Managers. She had previously served as an Alumni Council.

On 16 March 2020, Sayeh was nominated to the position of Deputy Managing Director of the IMF by Managing Director Kristalina Georgieva. On 12 September 2024, Sayeh retired.

== Honours ==
- Swarthmore College awarded the Lucretia Mott Award for Comparative literature
- The government of Niger expressed its gratitude for the support with a ceremony in April 2007
- Fletcher Memorial Award from the Fletcher School at Tuffs University in Massachusetts in September 2020
- Named in the list of the most influential African women in 2023

== Literature ==
- Antoinette Monsio Sayeh: Monetary dependence, payments disequilibria, and fiscal policy in a small, open, low-income economy: experiments with a hybrid model of Liberia. Ed.: Fletcher School of Law and Diplomacy. Boston 1985, p. 383 (English, habilitation thesis).
- N.N.: Interview with Liberian Finance Minister Antoinette M. Sayeh: S “tick to principles”. In: Development and Cooperation. Volume 7/8, 2008, ISSN 0723-6980, pp. 276–278 (English).

== Personal life ==
Antoinette Sayeh has a son.
