= George Koukou =

Liberian politician

George Koukou (born 25 May 1945) was acting Speaker of the National Transitional Legislative Assembly of Liberia from 17 March 2005 to January 2006. Originally from Nimba County, he now resides in the capital city of Monrovia. He is a member of the Mano ethnic group.

Prior to becoming a member of the National Transitional Legislative Assembly, Koukou was a senator from Nimba County. Koukou replaced George Dweh as Speaker of the transitional legislature on 17 March 2005 after Dweh was suspended indefinitely on 14 March for spending money without proper authorization.

On 17 July 2007, Koukou was arrested along with several others, including former army chief of staff Charles Julue, for alleged participation in a coup plot against President Ellen Johnson Sirleaf. He and Julu were charged with treason. Koukou claimed that he did not have the money to hire a lawyer. On 27 August, Monrovia Magistrate Court Judge Milton Taylor ruled that his court could not try Koukou because treason was above its jurisdiction, and he transferred the trial to Criminal Court "A".

George Koukou died on November 20, 2015.
