= Embassy of Liberia, Washington, D.C. =

Diplomatic mission of the Republic of Liberia to the United States

Embassy of Liberia in Washington, D.C.
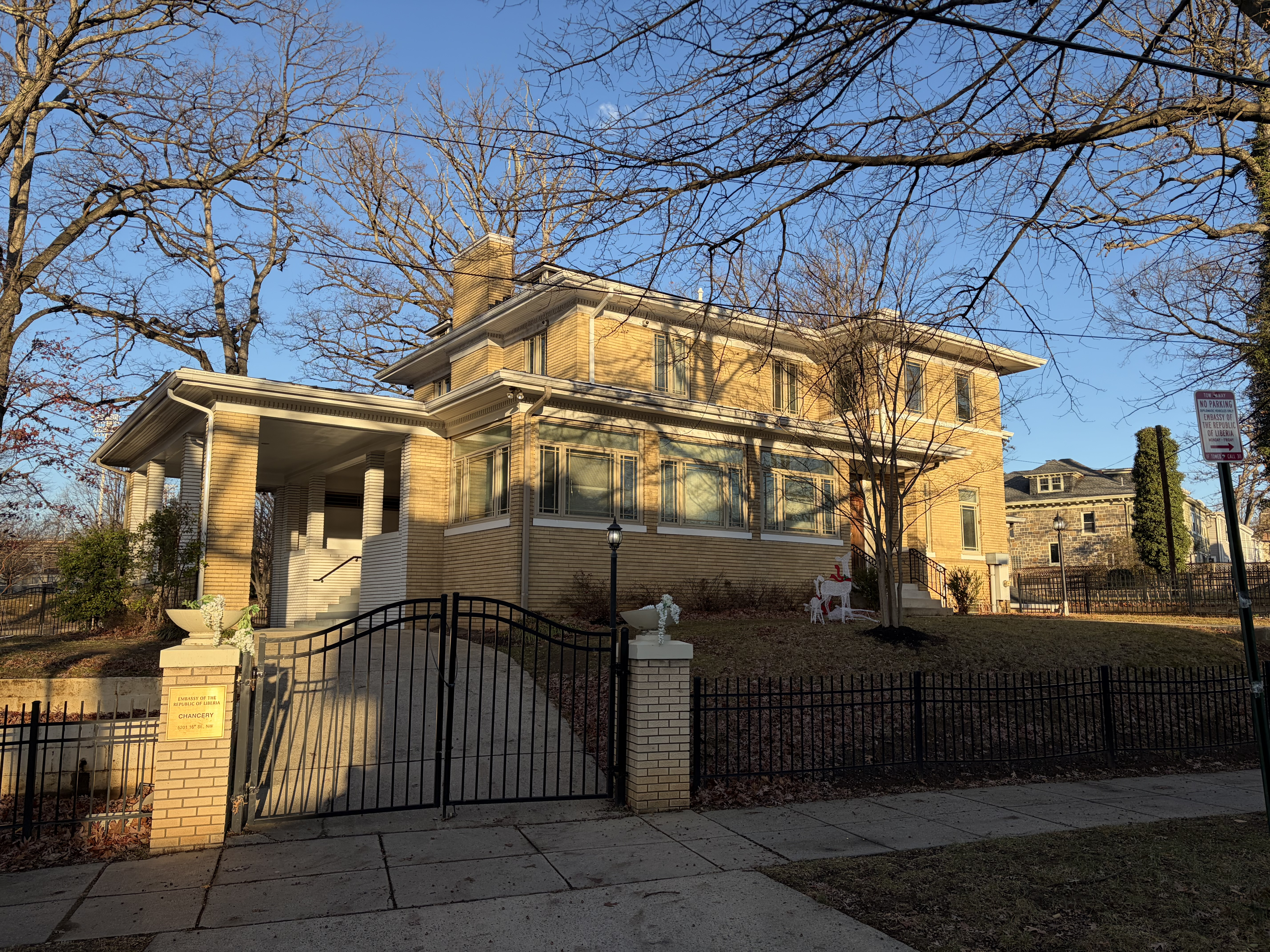
- The chancery of the Liberian embassy viewed from Colorado Avenue.
- Location: Washington, DC, United States
- Address: 5201 16th Street NW, Washington, DC
- Coordinates: 38°57′12″N 77°2′10″W
- Ambassador: Al-Hassan Conteh

The Embassy of Liberia in Washington, D.C. is the diplomatic mission of the Republic of Liberia to the United States. It is located at 5201 16th Street Northwest, Washington, D.C. in the 16th Street Heights neighborhood. The property was initially purchased to be the ambassador's residence, but Ambassador Charles D.B. King later purchased a different residence.

== Mission ==
The mission of the Embassy of Liberia in Washington, D.C., is to strengthen and promote friendly relations between Liberia and the United States, Canada, and Mexico. The Embassy seeks to advance bilateral cooperation and mobilize support for Liberia’s national development priorities under the ARREST Agenda for Inclusive Development. In line with Liberia’s foreign policy of economic diplomacy, the Embassy works to promote trade, investment, and economic partnerships. Additionally, the mission is committed to safeguarding the interests and welfare of Liberian citizens residing in the United States, Canada, and Mexico.

== See also ==
- Liberia – United States relations
