= Bhofal Chambers =

Liberian politician (born 1961)

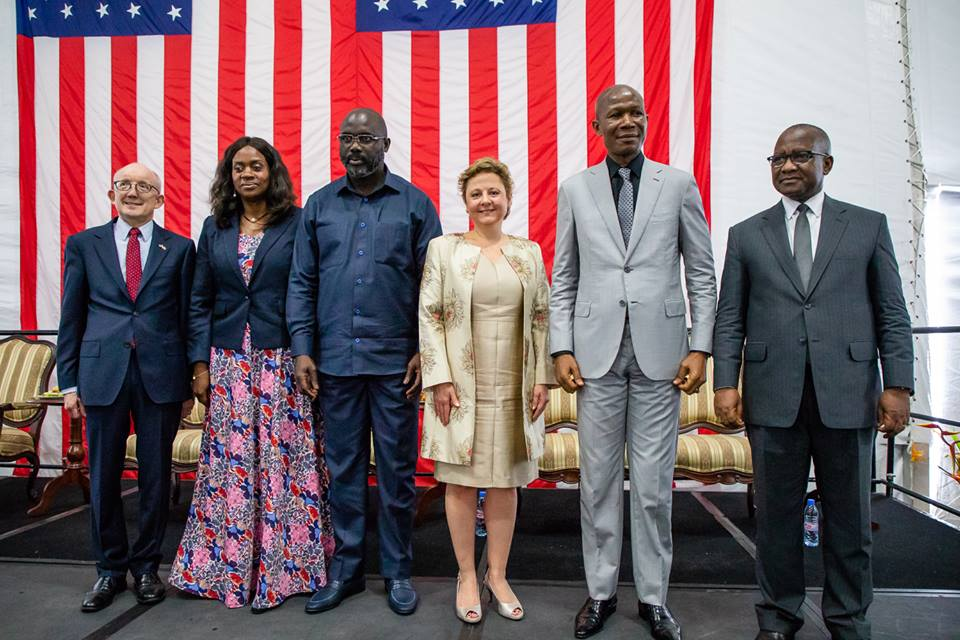
- Chambers second from right

Speaker of the House of Representatives of Liberia
- In office 15 January 2018 – 15 January 2024
- Preceded by: Emmanuel J. Nuquay
- Succeeded by: Jonathan F. Koffa

Bhofal Chambers (born in 1961) is a Liberian politician. He served as Speaker of the House of Representatives of Liberia from 2018 to 2024. He became a member of the House of Representatives of Liberia on January 16, 2006.

He was first elected to the House of Representatives in the elections of 2005.

In the 2023 House elections, Chambers was defeated in his attempt at re-election to Maryland County's 2nd electoral district by Collaborating Political Parties candidate Anthony F. Williams.
