= Bong Town =

Human settlement in Liberia

Coordinates: 06°48′06″N 010°21′10″W

Bong Town (also known as Bong Mine Community or just Bong) is a populated place in the Bong County of Liberia.

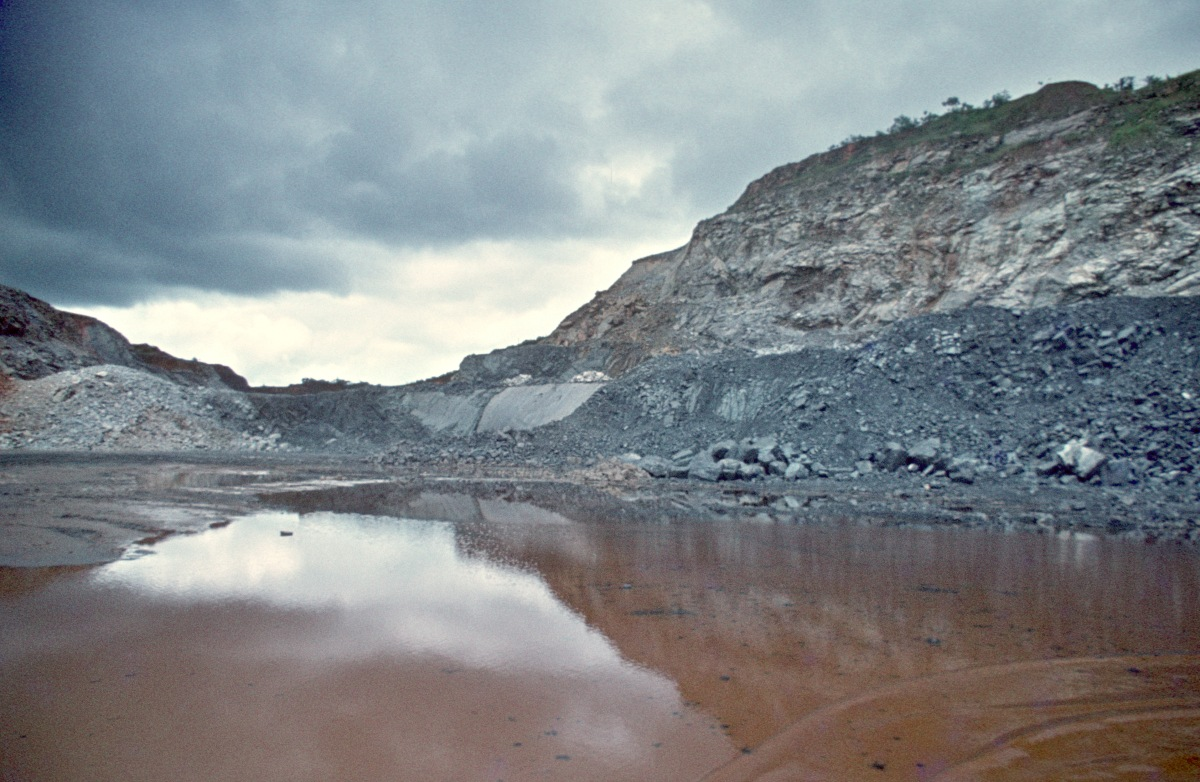
The Bong Mine, pictured in 1983

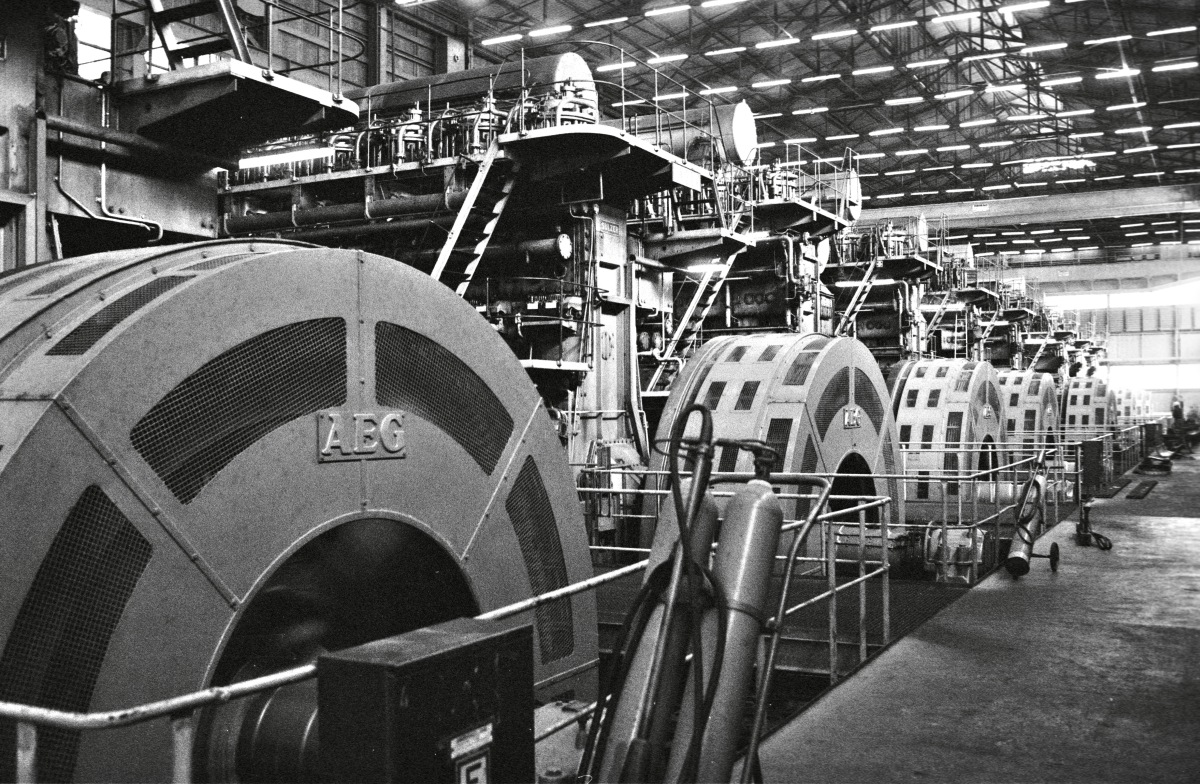
Powerhouse in Bong, 1983

From its establishment in 1958 through the late 1980s, the Bong Mining Company (BMC), a German-Italian-owned concession in Liberia built a substantial mining complex to surface-mine the iron ore of the mountain range just on the north side of the Margibi/Bong county borderline. Notably, the company constructed and maintained one of Liberia's main rail lines to the remote site to ship the iron ore from the mountains. Since 2009, the China Union Investment Company concession has begun to rebuild the complex and also has begun construction of a new paved road southward to Kakata. As of June 2012, the road had about 1/5 of its total distance covered with pavement with one small bridge under active construction just outside Kakata. As of April 2024, they have abandoned the project.

== Education ==
The town has one government secondary school. Many German children went to the formerly German school, especially in the 1960s, 1970s and 1980s. There was also a smaller British School for the children of English-speaking employees.

== Geography ==
Bong Town is connected by a partially paved road to Kakata and a rail line to the Freeport of Monrovia. The town is directly situated on a small iron ore-rich mountain range. Handi town is a small populated area north of Bong Town near the river.

== Notable people ==
- 2C (1987), United States-based singer and songwriter
