= Jonathan F. Koffa =

Liberian politician

Jonathon Fonati Koffa
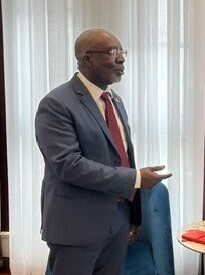
- Jonathan Fonati Koffa (2024)

Speaker of the House of Representatives of Liberia
- In office 15 January 2024 – 21 November 2024
- Preceded by: Bhofal Chambers
- Succeeded by: Richard Koon

Personal details
- Born: 18 September 1963 (age 62)

Jonathan Fonati Koffa (born 1963) is a Liberian lawyer and politician. He has served as speaker of the House of Representatives from January to November 2024.

== Political appointments ==
In 2016, Koffa was appointed by then President Ellen Johnson Sirleaf as Minister of State without Portfolio and Special Prosecutor of the Sable Mining bribery scandal.

== Legal career ==
Koffa is the founder and former managing partner of the International Law Group (ILG) and he has been practicing law since 1997 both in Liberia and the United States. Koffa was also admitted into the Supreme Court Bar of the Republic of Liberia with distinct honor as valedictorian of the graduating class.

== Legislature ==
In the 2017 House of Representatives election, Koffa was elected to represent Grand Kru County's 2nd electoral district. He ran for election under the Liberty Party (LP) banner. He had previously served as chairman of the LP. In August 2018, Koffa switched party affiliation from the LP to the Coalition for Democratic Change (CDC).

=== Leadership in the House of Representatives ===
Koffa was first appointed to the chairmanship of the Judiciary Committee of the 54th National Legislature. He was a member of the Committee on Elections and Inauguration as well as the Committee on Human & Civil Rights. He was the acting chairperson of the Grand Kru Legislative Caucus at the 54th National Legislature.

In January 2021, Koffa was elected as deputy speaker. In the 2023 election, Koffa was re-elected under the CDC banner. The CDC endorsed Koffa's run for speaker. In January 2024, Koffa was elected speaker by the House, defeating Richard Koon of the Unity Party by five votes. Koon was first elected speaker by the House on 21 November 2024, and he would serve in that position following his election. However the Supreme Court ruled his leadership to be illegal. Speaker Koffa resigned on 12 May 2025. Following Koffa's resignation, Koon was legitimately elected speaker on 13 May.

== Early life ==
Koffa was born on 18 September 1963 and is from Grand Kru County. He is a 1982 graduate of Cathedral Catholic High School. After acquiring his basic education in Liberia, Koffa traveled to the United States. While in the US Koffa enrolled at the Shaw University, Raleigh North Carolina, US, where he obtained a Bachelor of Public Administration (BPA-cum laude) with emphasis in urban planning. At Raleigh North Carolina State University, he obtained a master's in public administration (MPA). Koffa also obtained a Juris Doctor (JD), from the University of North Carolina School of Law at Chapel Hill.

In the early 2000s, Koffa served as town manager of Zebulon, North Carolina, in the United States. He had also served as town attorney for Rolesville, North Carolina. In 2004, a state news report revealed that Koffa, as a lawyer, had stolen money from clients. He was found guilty on a number of charges, including embezzlement. Following his sentence, Koffa returned to Liberia.

== Personal life ==
Koffa was born in Liberia and is married to Dama Yekeson Koffa. He has three children.
