= Grand Kru-2 =

Electoral district in Liberia

- Constituency for the House of Representatives of Liberia
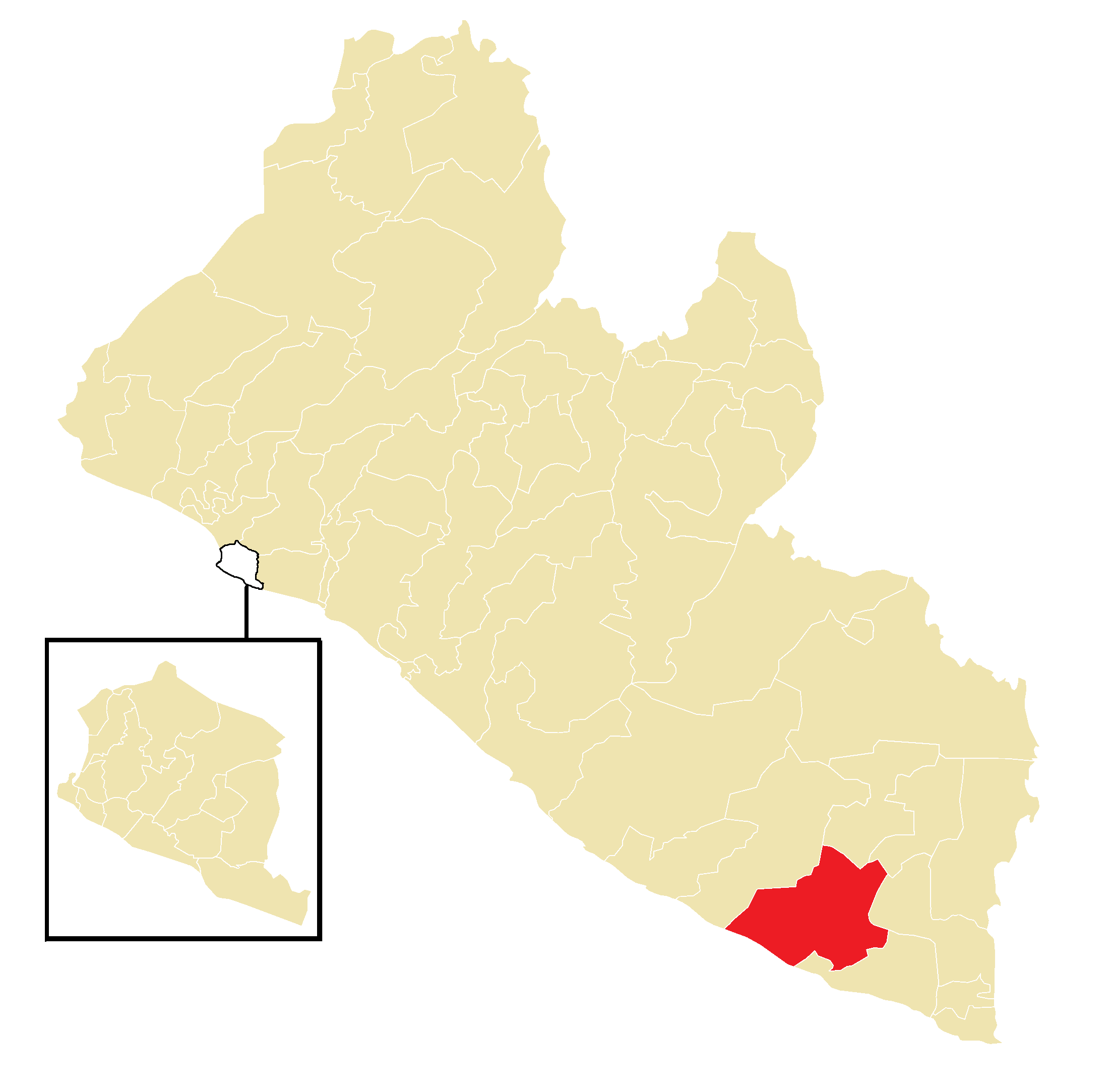
- Electorate: 21,957 (2023)

Current constituency
- Created: 2011
- Representative: Jonathan Fonati Koffa

Grand Kru-2 is an electoral district for the elections to the House of Representatives of Liberia. The constituency covers Barclayville city, Forpoh District, Wlogba District, Dweh District, Fenetow District, Kpi District, Gee District, Buah District, Bolloh District, Dorbor District, Lower Jloh District, Upper Jloh District, Felo Jekwi District and the Barclayville-Picnicess District (except the Kpor community).

== Elected representatives ==
| Year | Representative elected | Party | Notes |
|---|---|---|---|
| 2005 | George W. Blamoh | COTOL | |
| 2011 | Numene T. H. Bartekwa | MPC | |
| 2017 | Jonathan Fonati Koffa | LP | |
| 2023 | Jonathan Fonati Koffa | CDC | |

== Election results ==
2005 Grand Kru County's 2nd House District Election
| Candidate | Party | Votes | % |
|---|---|---|---|
| George W. Blamoh | Coalition for the Transformation of Liberia | 2,223 | 26.40 |
| James G. Browne | Liberty Party | 1,274 | 15.13 |
| Patrice Pokar Weah | Unity Party | 1,213 | 14.40 |
| Dargbe Nimley | National Patriotic Party | 1,149 | 13.64 |
| Ralph N. Harris | National Democratic Party of Liberia | 961 | 11.41 |
| John Neh Blamo Sr. | Alliance for Peace and Democracy | 899 | 10.67 |
| Sasa Sawlo Jlateh Sr. | Congress for Democratic Change | 703 | 8.35 |
| Total | | 8,422 | 100.00 |
| Valid votes | | 8,422 | 95.59 |
| Invalid/blank votes | | 389 | 4.41 |
| Total votes | | 8,811 | 100.00 |

2011 Grand Kru County's 2nd House District Election
| Candidate | Party | Votes | % |
|---|---|---|---|
| Numene T. H. Bartekwa | Movement for Progressive Change | 2,433 | 27.04 |
| Jonathan Fonati Koffa | Liberty Party | 2,059 | 22.88 |
| Gbenimah Balu Slopadoe I | Congress for Democratic Change | 1,182 | 13.13 |
| Isaiah Moboe Sarkor | Progressive Democratic Party | 823 | 9.15 |
| Theo Twiwlor Nimene | Unity Party | 808 | 8.98 |
| G. Fannoh Joseph | Alliance for Peace and Democracy | 516 | 5.73 |
| Nathaniel Chea Weah | Citizens Unification Party | 336 | 3.73 |
| Tehneseo P. Brohdonyen Sr. | National Democratic Party of Liberia | 305 | 3.39 |
| Patrick Nyanfore Broh | Liberia Transformation Party | 278 | 3.09 |
| Weah Bagilee Doh Sr. | National Democratic Coalition | 146 | 1.62 |
| B. Kumeh Seedee | National Union for Democratic Progress | 113 | 1.26 |
| Total | | 8,999 | 100.00 |
| Valid votes | | 8,999 | 94.23 |
| Invalid/blank votes | | 551 | 5.77 |
| Total votes | | 9,550 | 100.00 |

2017 Grand Kru County's 2nd House District Election
| Candidate | Party | Votes | % |
|---|---|---|---|
| Jonathan Fonati Koffa | Liberty Party | 4,189 | 32.24 |
| Numene T. H. Bartekwa (Incumbent) | Unity Party | 2,843 | 21.88 |
| Rosalind Tonne Sneh | Movement for Economic Empowerment | 2,192 | 16.87 |
| Francis Fonanyeneh Wreh | Coalition for Democratic Change | 1,373 | 10.57 |
| Monroe Wesseh Young | Independent | 928 | 7.14 |
| G. Fannoh Joseph | Movement for Democracy and Reconstruction | 628 | 4.83 |
| Dionysius Drawroh Sebwe | Grassroot Democratic Party of Liberia | 372 | 2.86 |
| Tehneseo P. Brohdonyen | All Liberian Party | 287 | 2.21 |
| Peter Doe-Sumah | Alternative National Congress | 183 | 1.41 |
| Total | | 12,995 | 100.00 |
| Valid votes | | 12,995 | 93.91 |
| Invalid/blank votes | | 843 | 6.09 |
| Total votes | | 13,838 | 100.00 |
