= Maryland-2 =

Electoral district in Liberia

- Constituency for the House of Representatives of Liberia
- Electorate: 24,934 (2023)

Current constituency
- Representative: Anthony F. Williams

Maryland-2 is an electoral district for the elections to the House of Representatives of Liberia. It is located in a central portion of Maryland County, bordering Grand Kru County and the Ivory Coast.

== Elected representatives ==
Year	Representative elected	Party	Notes
2005	Bhofal Chambers	UP	
2011	Bhofal Chambers	CDC	
2017	Bhofal Chambers	CDC	
2023	Anthony F. Williams	CPP	

== Election results ==
2005 Maryland County's 2nd House District Election
Candidate	Party	Votes	%
Bhofal Chambers	Unity Party	2,601	29.35
Nathaniel C. Wilson	National Democratic Party of Liberia	1,771	19.99
Abraham Tye Carr Sr.	Liberty Party	1,360	15.35
Nathaniel Namuh Johnson	Congress for Democratic Change	1,309	14.77
Wilmont Yeabay Brown	Freedom Alliance Party of Liberia	1,123	12.67
Samuel S. T. Wilson	Coalition for the Transformation of Liberia	697	7.87
Total		8,861	100.00
Valid votes		8,861	93.33
Invalid/blank votes		633	6.67
Total votes		9,494	100.00

2011 Maryland County's 2nd House District Election
Candidate	Party	Votes	%
Bhofal Chambers (Incumbent)	Congress for Democratic Change	4,171	41.15
Gripman Saytue	Liberia Transformation Party	1,854	18.29
Wilmot Yeabag Brown	Liberia Destiny Party	1,111	10.96
Eric Wlea Giko	Unity Party	1,046	10.32
George H. Nubo	National Democratic Coalition	932	9.19
Lawrence Blo-Youwah Kyne	Liberty Party	740	7.30
Nathaniel Namu Johnson	Movement for Progressive Change	283	2.79
Total		10,137	100.00
Valid votes		10,137	90.29
Invalid/blank votes		1,090	9.71
Total votes		11,227	100.00

2017 Maryland County's 2nd House District Election
Candidate	Party	Votes	%
Bhofal Chambers (Incumbent)	Coalition for Democratic Change	7,858	57.32
Anthony F. Williams	Liberia Transformation Party	2,006	14.63
Gripman Saytue	All Liberian Party	986	7.19
Wollor Emmanuel Topor	Alternative National Congress	941	6.86
Robert F. Neal II	Liberty Party	915	6.67
Jasper Y. Hne	Liberian People's Party	379	2.76
Condeh Keita Jarbo	Unity Party	267	1.95
Oliver Tomo Hne	Movement for Economic Empowerment	139	1.01
Musa Dioh Lawal	Movement for Democracy and Reconstruction	114	0.83
Emmanuel C. W. Aggrey	United People's Party	105	0.77
Total		13,710	100.00
Valid votes		13,710	93.50
Invalid/blank votes		953	6.50
Total votes		14,663	100.00
