= Firestone District =

District of Liberia

Coordinates: 6.367°N 10.375°W

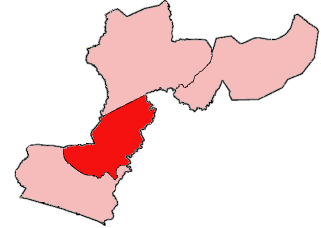
Location of Firestone District in Margibi County

Firestone District is one of four districts located in Margibi County, Liberia. It is home to Duside Hospital.
