= David Farhat =

Liberian politician

Minister of Finance
- In office 1988–1989
- President: Samuel Doe
- Preceded by: John G. Bestman
- Succeeded by: Emmanuel Shaw

David M. Farhat is a Liberian politician and member of the Free Democratic Party (FDP).

Running as the FDP presidential candidate in the 11 October 2005 elections, Farhat placed 16th out of 22 candidates, receiving 0.5% of the vote. He was Minister of Finance of Liberia from 1988 to 1989.
