= Rachel Gbenyon-Diggs =

Liberian diplomat

Rachel Gbenyon-Diggs is a Liberian diplomat who served as the country's ambassador to the United States from 1997 to 1999. She played an important role in attempting to rebuild relations between the two countries in the aftermath of the First Liberian Civil War.

== Career ==
Gbenyon-Diggs became ambassador in 1997, and presented her credentials on March 16, 1998. As Ambassador, Gbenyon-Diggs was considered a loyalist for the Charles Taylor government by the dissident diaspora publication The Perspective, and wrote an opinion piece in the Washington Post in response to an article about Liberia's involvement in the Sierra Leone Civil War, which she dismissed as "false and unsubstantiated allegations". Gbenyon-Diggs also led efforts to replace the chancery after the original fell into disrepair because of the civil war, negotiating a deal with the State Department to fund the new project using the back rent payments that were not paid by the American embassy in Monrovia during the war. She left the post in 1999.
