= Kakata District =

Coordinates: 6°31′48″N 10°21′06″W

- District
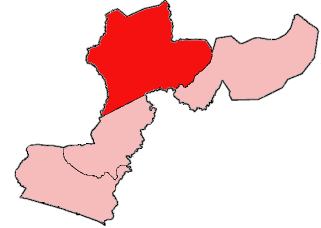
- Location of Kakata District in Margibi County
- Country: Liberia
- County: Margibi County
- Capital city: Kakata

Kakata District is one of four districts located in Margibi County, Liberia. Kakata, the capital city of Margibi County, is located in the district.
