= Booker Washington Institute =

High school in Kakata, Liberia

- Type: Public
- Established: 1929; 97 years ago
- Students: c. 1,800 (2014)
- Location: Kakata, Margibi County, Liberia; 6.53337°N 10.3609°W
- Campus: Rural
- Website: Official website

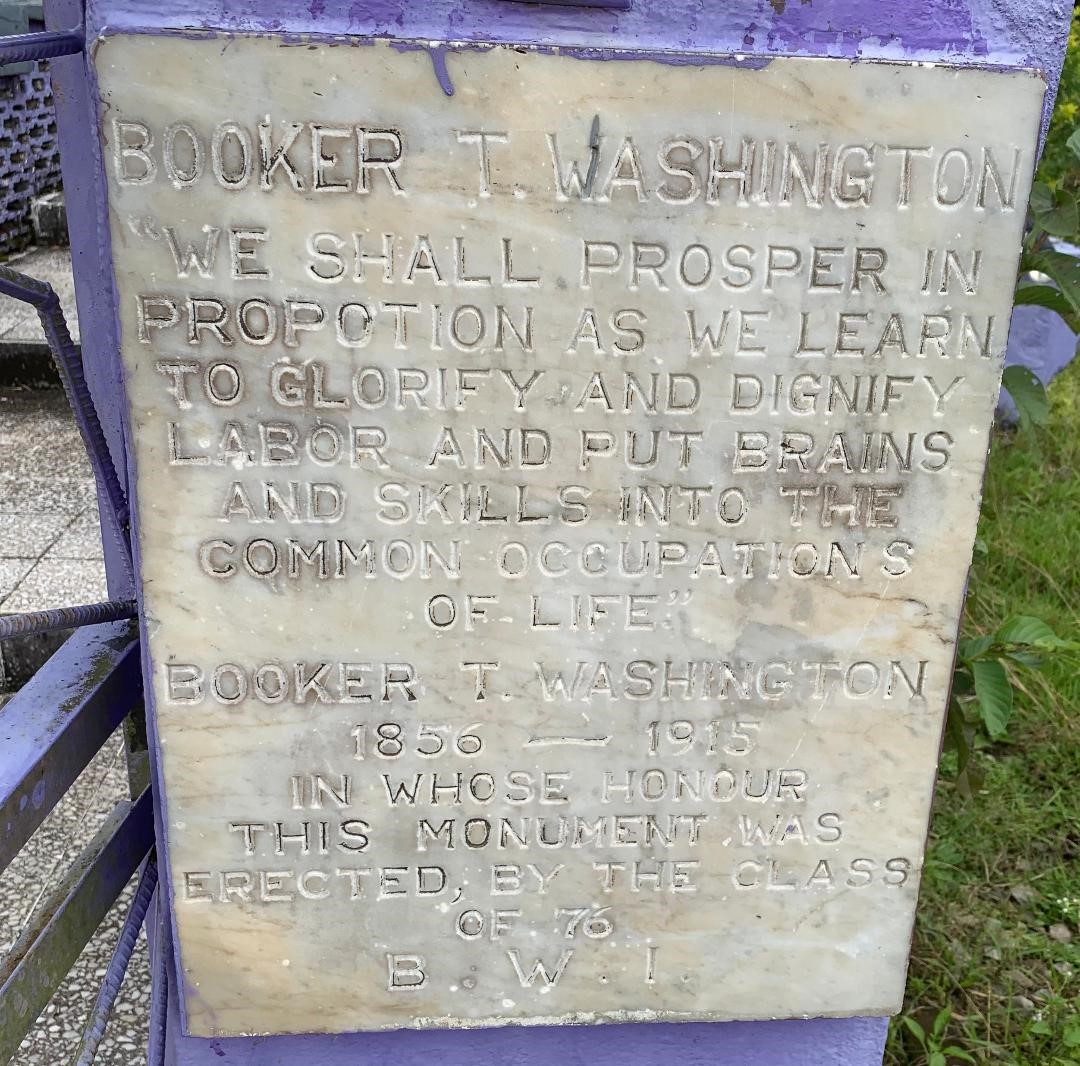
Booker T. Washington quote engraved in marble next to monument in honor of the American educator. Gift of class of '76.

The Booker Washington Institute (BWI) is a public, post-secondary school in Kakata, Margibi County, Liberia. Founded in 1929 as the Booker Washington Agricultural and Industrial Institute, it was the country's first agricultural and vocational school. BWI was founded with assistance from Americans and is named after American educator Booker T. Washington. Located east of the country's capital of Monrovia, the school sits on a large rural campus and has about 1,800 students.

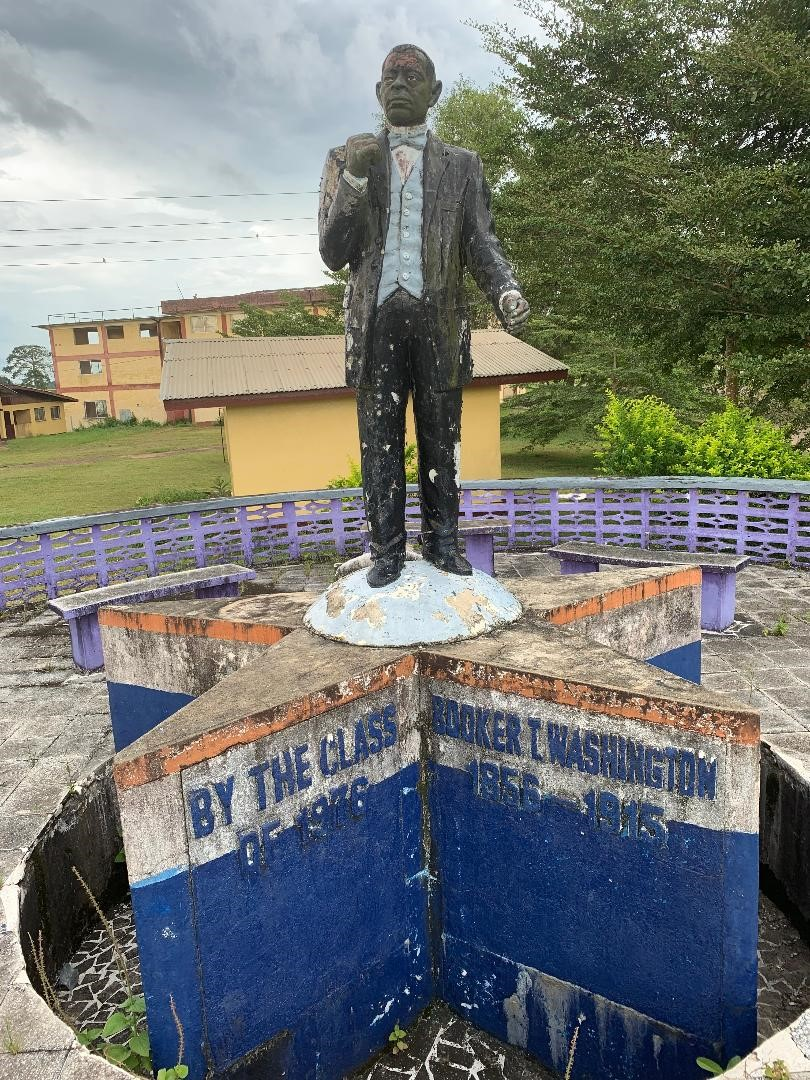
Booker T. Washington statue on campus

== History ==
During the 1920s Liberian President Charles D. B. King visited the United States and toured the Tuskegee Institute in Alabama founded by Booker T. Washington. Upon his return to Liberia, President King hired Massachusetts Institute of Technology's first African-American graduate, Robert Robinson Taylor, to design a campus for a similar school in Liberia. The government donated 1,000 acres (400 ha) in Margibi County for use by the new school, which was named after Washington. The school opened in 1929 with the financial assistance of the Firestone Natural Rubber Company and the Phelps Stokes Fund. Firestone had opened the world's largest rubber plantation in Liberia in 1926. Other supporters included the American Colonization Society, missionary boards, and individuals.

American James L. Sibley served as the first principal of the new school. All principals of the institute were white until 1946. BWI's board of trustees was run by Americans until the Liberian government assumed control in 1953. Board meetings were held in New York City. Prior to 1980, the school was one of several in the country to participate in the Army Student Training Program used to train officers for the Armed Forces of Liberia.

In 1990, the school was closed due to the violence from the First Liberian Civil War, and did not re-open until 2000. During the Second Liberian Civil War, it was attacked by rebel forces in April 2002, which then caused the school to close until September 2002. At one point in 2003 it was the only college open in Liberia after the University of Liberia had been attacked by Charles Taylor's forces. The school was the largest secondary school in the country during part of the first decade of the 21st century with around 1,500 pupils. In September 2003, ECOMIL peacekeeping troops used the school as a base. The alumni association started construction on an alumni center at the school in 2014. As of 2014, the school is transitioning from high school to a community college curriculum.

== Academics ==
The school was Liberia's first agricultural and vocational school. It is located about 41 miles (66 km) east of Monrovia, country's capital city. As of 2014, BWI has approximately 1,800 students enrolled at the 1,000-acre (400 ha) rural campus in Margibi County near the Kakata Rural Teacher Training Institute in Kakata. BWI has a computer lab used by both the school and other students, and offers courses in welding, carpentry, and agriculture. It also is an American Corners institution in which the United States federal government provides items such as computers and books used to study about the United States.
