= Gibi District =

District in Margibi County, Liberia

Coordinates: 6°34′59″N 10°00′47″W

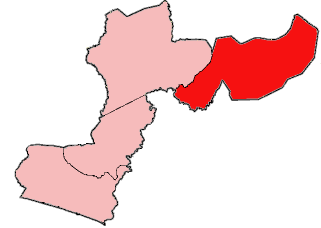
Location of Gibi District in Margibi County

Gibi District is one of four districts located in Margibi County, Liberia.
