= Central Bank of Liberia =

State-owned bank in Liberia

- Central bank of: Liberia
- Established: October 18, 1999
- Ownership: 100% state ownership
- Governor: Henry F. Saamoi
- Currency: Liberian dollar LRD (ISO 4217)
- Reserves: 260 million USD
- Website: www.cbl.org.lr

The Central Bank of Liberia is Liberia's central bank. Its current executive governor is Henry F. Saamoi. The offices of the bank are located in Monrovia, the capital of Liberia.

The bank is a member of the Alliance for Financial Inclusion.

== History ==
From 1974 to 2000, Liberia's central bank was the National Bank of Liberia. The Central Bank of Liberia, known as "CBL", was founded on October 18, 1999, by an act of the Liberian legislature, and began operations in the year 2000, at which time the National Bank of Liberia, or "NBL", was dissolved.

== Governors of National Bank of Liberia ==
- Charles A. Greene, 1974 - 1980
- Thomas D. Voer Hanson, 1980 - 1986
- John G. Bestman, 1986 - 1987
- Paul Jeffy, 1987 - 1988
- Thomas D. Voer Hanson, 1988 - 1989
- David K. Vinton, 1991 - 1995
- Raleigh Seekie, September 1995 - January 1996
- Ignatius Clay, Jan - March 1996
- Eisenhouwer York March - September 1996
- Ignatius Clay, Sept 1996 - August 1997
- Charles Bright, August 1997 - 2000

== Governors of Central Bank of Liberia ==
- Elie E. Saleeby, 2000 - May 2004, the first executive governor
- Charles A. Greene, May 2004 - 2006
- Joseph Mills Jones, 2006 - February 2016
- Charles Sirleaf, February 2016 - April 2016
- Milton Alvin Weeks, April 2016 - 2018
- Nathaniel R. Patray, 2018 - November 2019
- Jolue Aloysius Tarlue, November 2019 - 30 July 2024
- Henry F. Saamoi, 30 July 2024 - Incumbent

== See also ==
- Economy of Liberia
- Ministry of Finance (Liberia)
- Liberian dollar
- List of banks in Liberia
- List of central banks of Africa
- List of central banks
