= Lois Cheche Brutus =

Liberian diplomat

Lois Cheche Lewis Brutus is a Liberian diplomat. She was ambassador to the United States. She was president of the Association of Female Lawyers of Liberia.

== Life ==
She graduated from University of Liberia, and the Louis Arthur Grimes School of Law . In June 2007, she became ambassador to South Africa. She was project coordinator for the USAID, Children Assistance Program.
