= Benjamin Green Freeman =

Liberian politician

Benjamin Green Freeman was a Liberian politician. He was the Liberian ambassador to Senegal, Zaire and Côte d'Ivoire. He was Speaker of the House of Representatives of Liberia from 1943 to 1951.
