= Benjamin Anderson (adventurer) =

Liberian traveller, politician, and educator

Benjamin Joseph Knight Anderson (1834 (Note: One source erroneously lists his year of birth as 1805.)–1910) was a Liberian traveler, politician, and educator. He is known for having ventured into the then little known city of Musardu and published an account of it.

== Early life ==
Benjamin Joseph Knight Anderson was born 1834 in Baltimore, Maryland, United States. His father was named Israel, his mother Henrietta. In December 1851, when he was still a teenager, his family, except for his father, relocated to Liberia on board the Liberia-Packet. Liberia was where he received his education.

== Career ==
Anderson was a member of Liberia's original military unit. His highest rank was Colonel. From 1864 to 1866, he served as the Liberian Treasury's Comptroller and Secretary of the Treasury. However, in 1879 he was found guilty of embezzling money from the treasury. On February 14, 1868, he embarked on a journey to Musardu, a city in what is now found in Guinea in the western part of the Mandingo region; this made him one of the first people to explore that area. He is written to have convinced the Liberian government to focus on and develop the area more, because many natural resources could be found there and it was strategic for trading. After ending the exploration a year later, he went there again some time later. His accounts of Musardu were published in Narrative of a journey to Musardu: the capital of the Western Mandingoes (1870), which was reprinted a decade and one year later. In his later life, he stopped exploring and settled down as a mathematics teacher at an educational institution in Liberia. He retired in "the late 1890s".

== Personal life and death ==
Anderson was married with one child, a son named Benjamin John Knight. According to one source, he died during the middle of December 1910, while another states that he died on June 27, 1910.
