= David Gbala =

Liberian politician

David Gbala was a Liberian politician. He served as acting Deputy Speaker of the National Transitional Legislative Assembly of Liberia from 17 March 2005 to January 2006. He is from Grand Gedeh County. Gbala replaced Eddington Varmah as Deputy Speaker. Gbala died on 20 June 2019.

== See also ==
- Politics of Liberia
