= National Tax Lien Association =

American non-profit organization

The National Tax Lien Association
- Formation: 1997; 29 years ago
- Type: Nonprofit
- Location: United States
- Website: www.ntla.org

The National Tax Lien Association (NTLA) is a 501(c)(6) Nonprofit organization based in the United States. It represents the interest of government officials and private investors and servicers in regard to tax lien sales. It provides networking, training and certification opportunities in tax lien industry.

== History ==
The NTLA was established in 1997.

The two tax investing corporations that founded NTLA are Capital Asset Research Corporation out of West Palm Beach, Florida and Breen Capital out of Bordentown, New Jersey.

NTLA's first executive director was Howard Liggett, a member of Escambia County, FL Tax Collectors who served from 1997 to 2012. Brad Westover currently serves as the executive director (2012 to Present).
