= Francis A. Dennis =

Liberian diplomat

Francis A. Dennis, Sr.

Liberian Ambassador to the United States
- In office July 15, 1976 – 1979
- President: William R. Tolbert Jr.
- Preceded by: J. Urias Nelson
- Succeeded by: William V. S. Bull

Personal details
- Born: 24 August 1926 Monrovia, Liberia
- Died: 20 September 2008 (aged 82) Falls Church, Virginia
- Spouse: Evangeline Baromietta Morris Dennis
- Children: 2 sons, 2 daughters
- Education: University of Liberia

Francis A. Dennis, Sr. was a former Liberian diplomatic with ambassador assignments to the United Kingdom, Ivory Coast, the Soviet Union, Canada and United States.

== Personal life ==
While resident in Washington, D.C., Ambassador Dennis taught Bible class at First Baptist Church, where Jimmy and Rosalind Carter also attended during the Carter administration.

Dennis died on September 20, 2008, and was interred at the Dennis Family Cemetery in Careysburg, Liberia.

== Archives ==
Dennis assisted in developing the Ambassador’s Library at the Liberian Embassy in Washington, D.C., and donated many of his personal papers to the library.

In June 2011, Liberian foreign minister, Dr. Toga Gayewea McIntosh, and the Dennis family presided over the dedication and opening of the Ambassador Francis A. Dennis, Sr. Memorial Library at the Gabriel L. Dennis Foreign Service Institute, Ministry of Foreign Affairs in Monrovia. The memorial library was established to support initiatives related to diplomacy, academics and faith. In a statement by Liberian president Ellen Johnson Sirleaf, she said Dennis “represented the best that this country had to offer… Liberia owes him a debt of gratitude.”

== External sources ==
Remarks by President Ellen Johnson Sirleaf at the Opening of the Ambassador Francis Dennis Memorial Library (June 2011).

Papers of Ambassador Francis A. Dennis (2010)
