= The Liberian Bank for Development & Investment =

Liberian national development bank

The Liberian Bank for Development & Investment (LBDI)
- Company type: Private
- Industry: Financial services
- Founded: 1961
- Headquarters: Corner of Tubman Boulevard & 9th Street, Sinkor; Monrovia, Liberia
- Number of locations: 3 branches (2025)
- Key people: Dr. Christian N. Allison, II; President & CEO Mark Akwenah Nyeamene; General Manager & DCEO P. Blama M. Siryon; Comptroller & CFO
- Revenue: ▼ L$ 0.945 Billion (2022)
- Net income: ▼ L$ (2.016) Billion (2022)
- Total assets: ▼ L$ 25.647 Billion (2022)
- Owner: Government of Liberia (20%); National Social Security & Welfare Corporation (16%); AIMAC (15.9%); ECOWAS Bank for Development & Investment (12.9%); French Development Agency (4.0%); Firestone Plantation Company (1.1%)

The Liberian Bank for Development and Investment (LBDI) is a Liberian national development bank that has since 1988 also acted as a commercial bank. It is headquartered in Monrovia and was established by the Liberian government and a number of foreign development companies to help develop the financial infrastructure in Liberia.

== History ==
It was created by an Act of the National Legislature in 1961 under the joint initiative of the Liberian government and major international financial institutions who purchased equity in the Bank, namely: International Finance Corporation, Commonwealth Development Corporation, Capital Partners, European Investment Bank, the Agence française de développement, and Deutsche Investitions-und Entwicklungesllchaft, over 150 private Liberians, other international and local institutions. Foreign shareholding is 44.47% and local shareholding is 55.53%.

LBDI is predominantly a privately owned institution under private management and a Board of Directors elected annually by its Shareholders. The Bank commenced operations in 1965 as Liberian Bank for Industrial Development and Investment.

Under an amendment in 1974, the name was changed to the Liberian Bank for Development and Investment (LBDI). A further amendment in 1988 allowed the Bank to engage in commercial banking activities, to complement its development objectives.
