= Liberia–United States relations =

- Liberia: United States

Liberia–United States relations are bilateral relations between Liberia and the United States. The two countries shared a close relationship until the 1970s.

== History ==
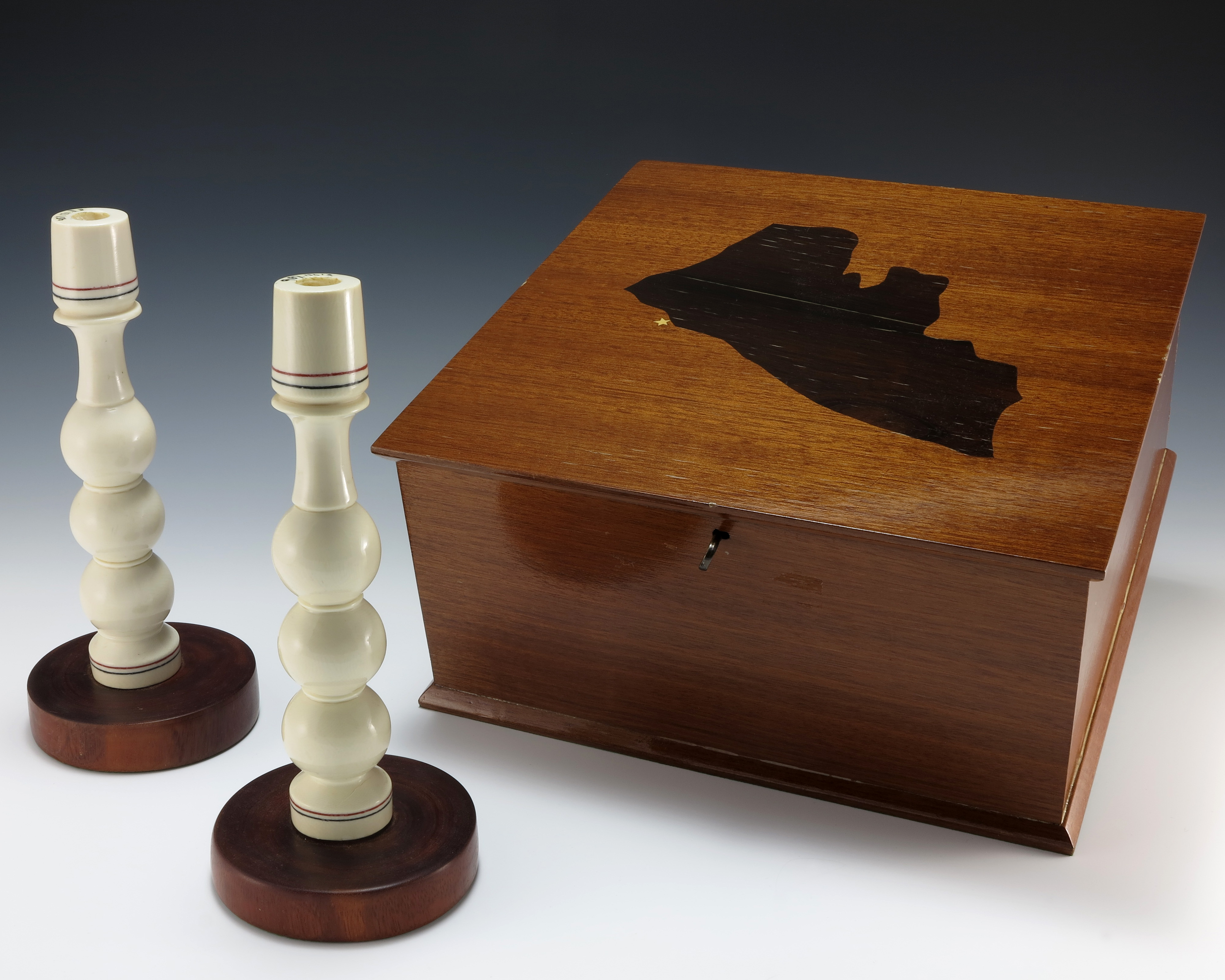
A pair of ivory candlesticks with a wooden presentation box that was gifted to American President Gerald Ford by Liberian President William Tolbert.

U.S. relations with Liberia date back to 1819, when the US Congress appropriated $100,000 for the establishment of Liberia. Although Liberia declared its independence in 1847, United States senators from southern states prevented its recognition as a sovereign nation until 1862, during the American Civil War, after the entire Southern delegation in Congress had departed. The two nations shared very close diplomatic, economic, and military ties until the 1990s.

=== U.S. assists Americo-Liberians ===
President William Howard Taft devoted a considerable portion of his First Annual Message to Congress (December 7, 1909) to the Liberian question, noting the close historical ties between the two countries that gave an opening for a wider intervention:

"It will be remembered that the interest of the United States in the Republic of Liberia springs from the historical fact of the foundation of the Republic by the colonization of American citizens of the African race. In an early treaty with Liberia, there is a provision under which the United States may be called upon for advice or assistance. Pursuant to this provision and in the spirit of the moral relationship of the United States to Liberia, that Republic last year asked this Government to lend assistance in the solution of certain of their national problems, and hence the Commission was sent across the ocean on two cruisers."

In 1926, the Liberian government gave a concession to the American rubber company Firestone to start the world's largest rubber plantation at Harbel, Liberia. At the same time, Firestone arranged a $5 million private loan to Liberia.

In the 1930s Liberia was again virtually bankrupt, and, after some American pressure, agreed to an assistance plan from the League of Nations. As part of this plan, two key officials of the League were placed in positions to "advise" the Liberian government.

Ever since President Taft, American support for Liberian independence, prosperity, and reform were priorities. The major American role was training the Liberian army, known as the Liberian Frontier Force, using elite black officers from the regular United States Army. The American presence warned away European imperial powers, defeated a series of local rebellions, and helped bring in American technology to develop the resource-rich interior. Democracy was not a high priority, as the 15,000 Americano-Liberians had full control of 750,000 locals. The Krus and Greboe tribes remained highly reluctant to accept control from Monrovia, but they were not powerful enough to overcome a regime strongly supported by the United States Army and Navy. The American officers including Charles Young, Benjamin Davis, and others were skilled at training recruits, helping the government minimize corruption, and advocating loans from American corporations while monitoring the resulting flow of funds.

=== World War II ===
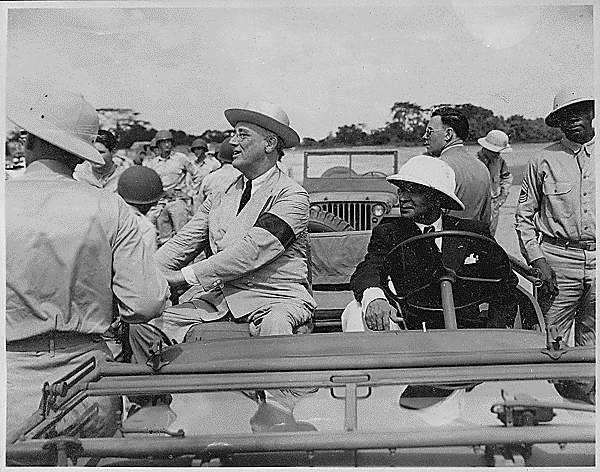
President Edwin Barclay (right) and U.S. President Franklin D. Roosevelt during World War II, January 1943

During World War II, Liberia joined the Allies and Monrovia was host to important Allied logistics bases. Firestone was a large munitions supplier for the Allies.

=== Since 1970 ===
Liberian and United States relationships became strained between 1971 and 1980 due to Liberian president William Tolbert's establishment of diplomatic relations with the Soviet Union and other Eastern Bloc countries. In 1978, United States president Jimmy Carter made the first official presidential visit to Liberia.

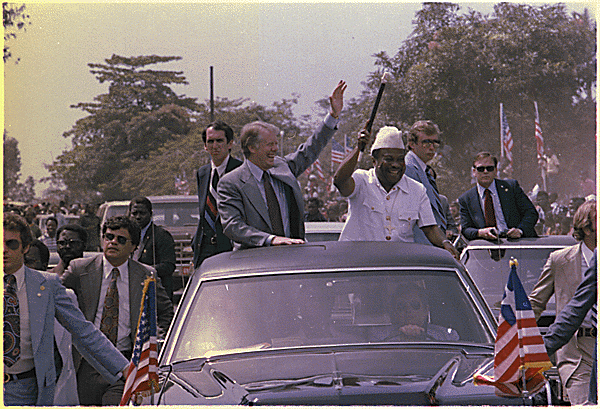
Liberian President Tolbert and U.S. President Jimmy Carter (in car, left) in Monrovia

The rise of Charles Taylor's government, the Liberian Civil War, regional instability and human rights abuses interrupted the previously close relations between Liberia and the United States. Charles Taylor's election in 1997 was monitored by the Economic Community of West African States and the United States officially recognized the result and the new government. However, during Taylor's presidency, the United States cut direct financial and military aid to the Liberian government, withdrew Peace Corps operations, imposed a travel ban on senior Liberian Government officials, and frequently criticized Charles Taylor's government. Much of the Liberian-American tension from this period stems from the Liberian government's acknowledged support for the Revolutionary United Front, a rebel group in Sierra Leone and surrounding region. Due to intense pressure from the international community and the United States, along with Liberian civic organizations like the Women of Liberia Mass Action for Peace, Charles Taylor resigned his office on August 11, 2003.

The resignation and exile of Charles Taylor in 2003 brought changes in diplomatic ties between the United States and Liberia. On July 30, 2003, the United States proposed a UN Security Council draft resolution to authorize the deployment of a multi-national stabilization force. Despite stated concerns about prosecution in the International Criminal Court, United States president George W. Bush sent 200 marines to Monrovia's airport to support the peace-keeping effort. The United States also deployed warships along Liberia's coast as part of the stabilization effort. The United States committed $1.16 billion to Liberia between the years of 2004 and 2006.

== USAID ==
The United States Agency for International Development (USAID) implements the U.S. Government's development assistance program. USAID's post-conflict rebuilding strategy focuses on reintegration and is increasingly moving towards a longer-term development focus. Rehabilitation efforts include national and community infrastructure projects, such as building roads, refurbishing government buildings, and training Liberians in vocational skills. USAID also funds basic education programs, improving education for children, focusing on girls, and training teachers. In the health area, USAID programs include primary health care clinics, HIV/AIDS prevention, and a large malaria program. USAID supports rule of law programs, establishing legal aid clinics and victim abuse centers, training judges and lawyers, community peace building and reconciliation efforts, and anti-corruption projects to promote transparency and accountability in public sector entities. USAID is also providing support to strengthen the legislature and other political processes. USAID is strengthening civil society's role in delivering services and advocating good governance. Total USAID funding program for these programs in FY 2007 was $65.9 million.

In 2009, a 17.5 million dollar contract was offered to Liberia with the International Foundation for Electoral Systems as the conduit. This money was meant to support the 2011 general elections and 2014 Senate elections.

On December 9, 2025, Liberia signed an agreement with the United States over health care assistance. The United States agreed to provide up to $124 million in aid over the next five years to strengthen Liberia's healthcare system. This deal was part of a larger effort by the Trump administration to procure bilateral aid agreements that differ from the multilateral approach taken by the World Health Organization and differ from traditional USAID delivery methods. The United States has signed similar deals with 16 other African countries as of March 2026.

== Millennium Challenge Corporation’s (MCC) ==
On December 18, during its quarterly meeting, the Millennium Challenge Corporation (MCC) Board of Directors designated Liberia as newly eligible to develop a compact. This decision acknowledges Liberia’s significant progress in improving its performance on the MCC scorecard and its dedication to advancing key economic and democratic governance reforms. Additionally, the Board explored new opportunities introduced by the Millennium Challenge Corporation Candidate Country Reform Act.

== Resident diplomatic missions ==
- Liberia has an embassy in Washington, D.C.
- United States has an embassy in Monrovia.
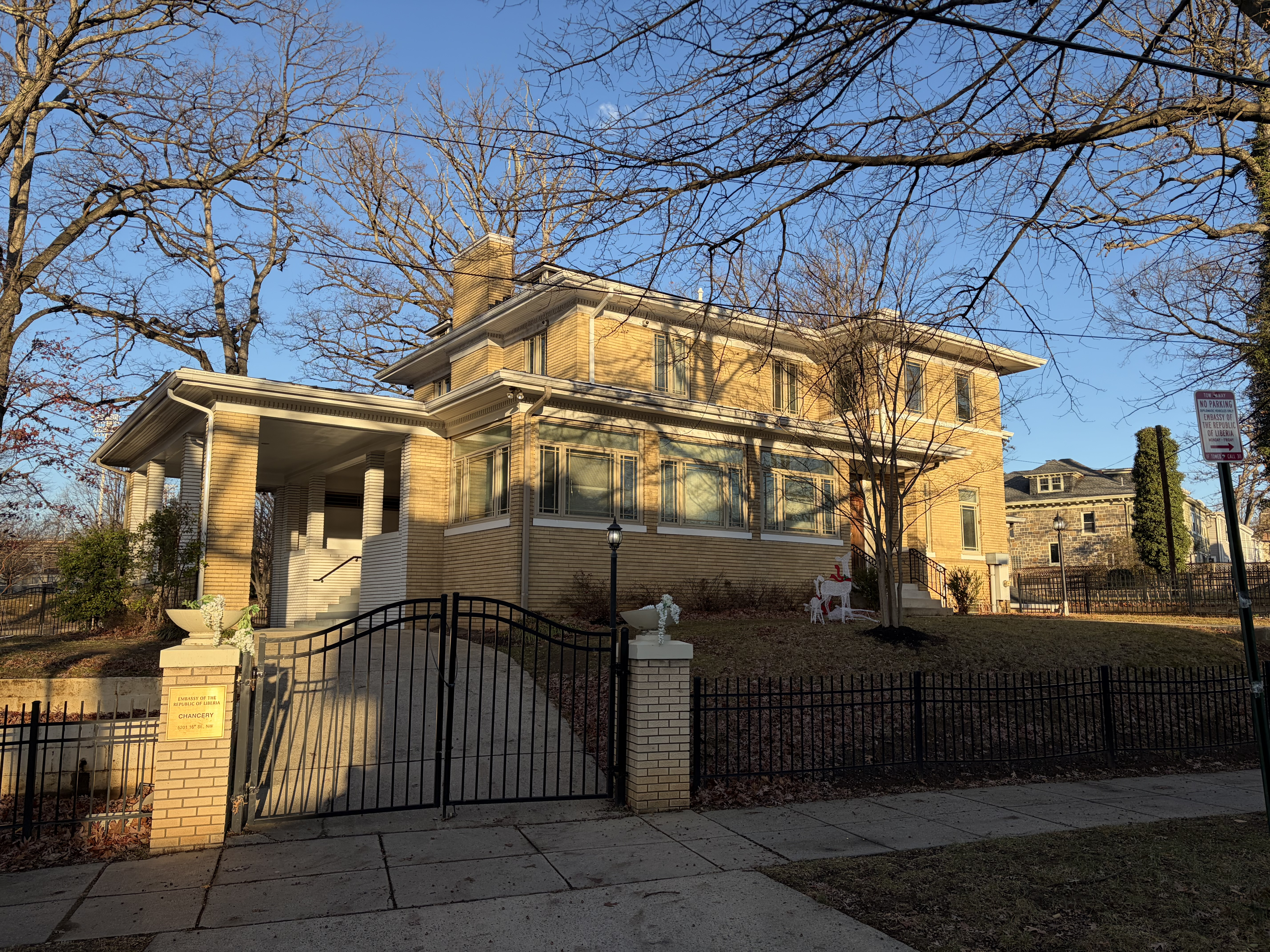
Embassy of Liberia in Washington, D.C.

== See also ==
- Foreign relations of Liberia
- Foreign relations of the United States
- Africa-United States relations
- List of ambassadors of Liberia to the United States
- List of ambassadors of the United States to Liberia
