= Salala, Bong County =

Village in Bong county, Liberia

- Location in Liberia
- Coordinates: 6°44′47″N 10°6′27″W
- Country: Liberia
- County: Bong County

Salala is a town in Bong County, Liberia. It was the site of a refugee camp for over 50,000 people who have fled the violence in Liberia ("The Humanitarian Situation in Liberia")

Salala is divided into two parts--Salala and Saysayla. Each part has a population of about 3000, according to data gathered from the clinic in 2020, for a total population of about 6000. It has many schools, including Martha Tubman Public School, Gormalon Public School, Faith Foundation, a Catholic School, a Lutheran School, and a Salvation Army school. There are a mosque and many churches. There are an entertainment center, a business center, and shops on the main road.

There is a small daily market, as well as a large market on Fridays, located on the Old Road.
