= Salala Village =

- Village
- Country: India
- State: Punjab
- District: Jalandhar

Languages
  - Official: Punjabi
- Time zone: UTC+5:30 (IST)

Salala is a small village in the state of Punjab located in India. The village falls under District Jalandhar.

== About ==
Salala lies on the Bhogpur to Adampur connecting road. The village is popular for a Sikh Temple called Gurdwara Shaheed Ganj. The main occupation for the residents living here is agriculture. This village is physically connected to its neighboring village, known as " Khojkipur." sarpanch kewal Singh next in line Jugraj Sidhu

== Postal information ==
Salala has its own post office located on the main road near the temple and its postal code is 144102.
