= Ministry of Finance and Development Planning (Liberia) =

Government ministry of Liberia

The Ministry of Finance and Development Planning, or MFDP for short, is a government ministry of the Republic of Liberia. MFDP was created in 2013 by an Act of the National Legislature. The new ministry replaced the Ministry of Finance and the Ministry of Planning and Economy.

== See also ==
- Ministry of Finance (Liberia)
