= National Transitional Legislative Assembly of Liberia =

The National Transitional Legislative Assembly (NTLA) was Liberia's legislative body during the country's transition from civil war to democratic rule (October 2003–January 2006).

== Background ==
The NTLA was created as part of an August 2003 peace agreement that ended a civil war between government forces of President Charles Taylor and two rebel groups - Liberians United for Reconciliation and Democracy (LURD) and the Movement for Democracy in Liberia (MODEL). It also called for the creation of a broad-based transitional government that would rule for two years, ending with the holding of elections in October 2005 and the installation of a democratically elected government by January 2006.

== Composition ==
The NTLA replaced the bicameral Legislature, which was elected in 1997. It consisted of 76 appointed members representing the Taylor government, rebel groups, political parties, and civil society. The distribution of seats among these groups is as follows:

Government of Liberia	12 Seats
Liberians United for Reconciliation and Democracy (LURD)	12 Seats
Movement for Democracy in Liberia (MODEL)	12 Seats
Political Party Representatives	18 Seats
County Representatives	15 Seats
Civil Society and Special Interest Groups	07 Seats

Note: Civil Society and Special Interest Groups included the National Bar Association, Liberian business organizations, Women's organizations, Trade unions, Teachers unions, Liberians in the Diaspora, and Youth organizations.

== Responsibilities ==
According to the 2003 peace agreement, the responsibilities of the National Transitional Legislative Assembly were to:

1. Function as a legislative body.
2. Approve the policies and programs of the National Transitional Government of Liberia (NTGL) for implementation by the cabinet.
3. Encourage and support the emergence of a new democratic space, particularly in the areas of human rights and freedom of expression.

== Leadership ==
The NTLA was led by a Speaker and Deputy Speaker elected by Assembly members.

George Dweh, a founding member of LURD and Eddington Varmah, a Justice Minister in the Taylor government were elected unopposed as Speaker and Deputy Speaker in October 2003. Both were suspended indefinitely on 14 March 2005, along with two other members, for spending money without proper authorization. A vote held on 17 March resulted in George Koukou being elected acting Speaker and David Gbala chosen as Deputy Speaker. Koukou received 39 votes while his only opponent Fayah Gbollie, a former presidential candidate and representative of the Free Democratic Party (FDP), won 4.

== See also ==
- Liberia
- Legislature of Liberia
  - Senate of Liberia
  - House of Representatives of Liberia
- Legislative Branch
- List of national legislatures
