= George Dweh =

Liberian politician (1961–2020)

- Born: March 6, 1961
- Died: April 4, 2020 (aged 59)
- Occupations: politician, warlord
- Known for: Speaker of the National Transitional Legislative Assembly of Liberia (NTLA); suspended, accused of financial mismanagement and corruption
- Children: 6 (all variations of the name George)
- Relatives: Samuel K. Doe (cousin)

George Dweh (March 6, 1961 – April 4, 2020) was a Liberian politician, Warlord and a member of the ethnic Krahn group who formerly operated in the LURD and the MODEL faction groups. He is also a cousin of the former president Samuel K. Doe, a Krahn who seized power in a 1980 coup.

Despite widespread resistance to his appointment amidst allegations of his involvement in numerous massacres, Dweh served as Speaker of the National Transitional Legislative Assembly of Liberia (NTLA) from October 2003 to 14 March 2005, when he was suspended from the body after being accused of financial mismanagement and corruption.
