= Margibi County =

County of Liberia

- County
- Flag

- Location in Liberia
- Coordinates: 6°30′N 10°15′W
- Country: Liberia
- Capital: Kakata
- Districts: 5
- Established: 13 December, 1985

Government
  - Superintendent: John Zubah Buway

Area
  - Total: 2,616 km^{2} (1,010 sq mi)

Population (2022)
  - Total: 304,946
  - Density: 116.6/km^{2} (301.9/sq mi)
- Time zone: UTC+0 (GMT)
- HDI (2018): 0.465 low · 2nd of 15

Margibi is a county on the north to central coast of Liberia. One of 15 counties that constitute the first-level of administrative division in the nation, it has five districts. Kakata serves as the capital with the area of the county measuring 1,010 square miles (2,600 km^{2}). As of the 2022 Census, it had a population of 304,946, making it the fifth most populous county in Liberia.

Margibi's County Superintendent is John Zubah Buway. The county is bordered by Montserrado County to the west, Grand Bassa County to the east, and Bong County on the north. The southern part of Margibi lies on the Atlantic Ocean.

== Geography ==
Margibi County has a National proposed reserve in Margibi Mangrove, occupying an area of 23,818 ha (58,860 acres). The county has coastal plains that raises to a height of 30 m (98 ft) above the sea-level inward to a distance of 25 km (16 mi). These plains receive a very high rainfall ranging from 4,450 mm (175 in) to 4,500 mm (180 in) per year and receive longer sunshine with a humidity of 85 to 95 percent. It is swampy along rivers and creeks, while there are patches of Savannah woodland. Rice and cassava interplanted with Sugarcane are the major crops grown in the region. The northern or the upper part of the highland has tropical forest which is usually 30 m (98 ft) above the mean sea level. The regions receive a bimodal rainfall with a gap of two weeks in between. Cocoa, coffee, rubber, citrus oil, and palm are the most common crops in the region.

== Demographics ==
As of 2008, the county had a population of 209,923: 105,840 male and 104,083 female. The sex ratio was 101.7 compared to 100.9 in the 1994 census. The number of households during 2008 was 19,254 and the average size of the households was 4.6. The population was 7.20 percent of the total population, while it was 6.00 percent in 1994. The county had an area of 1,039 sq mi and the density per sq. mi was 202. The density during the 1984 census stood at 146. Liberia experienced civil war during various times and the total number of people displaced on account of wars as of 2008 in the county was 46,663. The number of people residing in urban areas was 88,868, with 43,723 males and 45,145 females. The total number of people in rural areas was 121,055, with 62,117 males and 58,938 females. The total fraction of people residing in urban areas was 42.33 percent, while the remaining 58 percent were living in rural areas. The number of people resettled as of 2008 was 29,813 while the number of people who were not resettled was 1,754. The number of literates above the age of ten as of 2008 55,994 while the number of illiterates was 39,112 making the literacy rate 58.88 percent. The total number of literate males was 33,596 while the total number of literate females was 22,398. Around 90 percent of the county's population is Christian, 5 percent is Muslim, and 5 percent is Animist.

== History ==
Margibi County is one of the latest set of counties created in 1985 by an Interim National Assembly decree dated December 13, 1985. During the Civil War, the county was one of the largest to have maximum displacements. An estimated 200,000 people were displaced in the county between Konala and Kakata. The county was created by merging the territories of Marshall and Gibi. The county was traditionally inhabited by Bassa tribe. The Kpelle, a southwestern Mende speaking people are another tribe along with the Bassa, who also have their historic homelands in the region.

== Economy ==
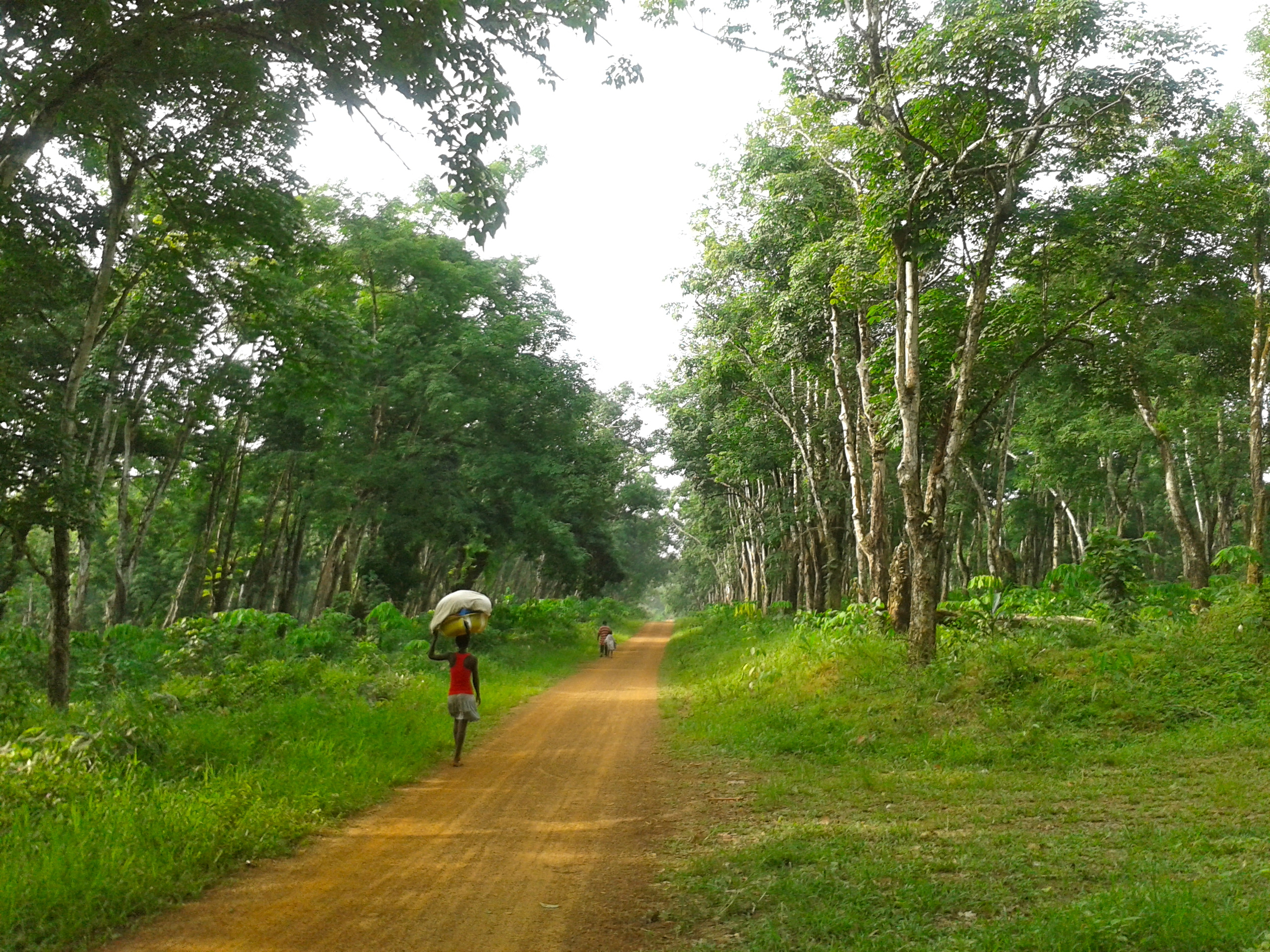
Rubber plantation in the county

As of 2011, the area of rice plantation was 6,170 ha (15,200 acres), which was 2.584 percent of the total area of rice planted in the country. The total production stood at 7000 metric tonnes. As of 2011, the number of Cassava plantations was 6070, which was 5 percent of the total area of Cassava planted in the country. The total production stood at 760 metric tonnes. The number of Cocoa plantations was 760, which was 2 percent of the total area of Cassava planted in the country. The number of rubber plantations was 3680, which was 5.9 percent of the total area of Cassava planted in the country. The number of Coffee plantations was 340, which was 1.5 percent of the total area of Cassava planted in the country. As of 2008, the county had 14,872 paid employees, 27,567 self-employed people, 19,298 family workers, 7,048 people looking for work, 9,193 not working people, 23,012 people working in households, 40,953 students, 1,330 retired people, 2,789 incapacitated people, 3,227 part-time workers and 20,954 others, making the total working population of 170,243.

== Administration ==
Districts of Margibi County include (2008 population): Firestone District (57,251), Gibi District (13,232), Kakata District (88,130) and Mambah-Kaba District (41,076) The Legislature of Liberia was modeled based on the Legislature of United States. It is bicameral in nature with a Senate and the House of Representatives. There are 13 counties in the country and based on the population, each county is defined to have at least two members, while the total number of members to the house including the Speaker is 64. Each member represents an electoral district and is elected to a six-year term based on popular vote. There were 26 senators, two each for the 13 counties and they serve a nine-year term (30 senators, 15 counties, and nine years from 2011). Senators are also elected based on a plurality of votes. The vice-president is the head of the Senate and he also acts as president in his absence.
