= List of senators from Nimba County =

Nimba County highlighted in red.

Nimba County elects two senators to the Senate of Liberia. It is currently represented by Nya D. Twayen Jr and Samuel G. Kogar.

== List of senators ==
Senator Elected	Year (Note: Indicates the year or years the senator was elected.)	Party (Note: Indicates party the senator was registered with during their election.)	Notes
Prince Yormie Johnson	2005	IND	Founded the NUDP in 2010, was expelled from the party ahead of the 2014 elections.
Prince Yormie Johnson	2014	IND	Founded the MDR in 2016.
Prince Yormie Johnson	2023	MDR	Died in office in 2024.
Saye-Taayor Adolphus Dolo	2005	COTOL	Ran with the UP for re-election in 2011. Ran as an independent in 2020.
Thomas Semandahn Grupee	2011	NUDP	Ran with the MPC for re-election in 2020.
Jeremiah Kpan Koung	2020	MDR	Elected vice president in 2023.
Nya D. Twayen Jr.	2024	UP	
Samuel Gongben Kogar	2025	MDR	Elected in the 2025 Nimba County Senate by-election

== See also ==
- Nimba County House of Representatives districts
  - Nimba-1
  - Nimba-2
  - Nimba-3
  - Nimba-4
  - Nimba-5
  - Nimba-6
  - Nimba-7
  - Nimba-8
  - Nimba-9
