= List of senators from Bomi County =

Bomi County highlighted in red.

Bomi County elects two senators to the Senate of Liberia. It is currently represented by Edwin Snowe and Alex J. Tyler.

== List of senators ==
Senator Elected	Year (Note: Indicates the year or years the senator was elected.)	Party (Note: Indicates party the senator was registered with during their election.)	Notes
Lahai Gbabye Lansanah	2005	NDPL	Ran with the NPP for re-election in 2014.
Richard Blamah Devine	2005	COTOL	Ran with the UP for re-election in 2011.
Sando Dazoe Johnson	2011	NPP	Ran with the CPP for re-election in 2020.
Morris Gato Saytumah	2014	UP	Ran as an independent for re-election in 2023.
Edwin Snowe	2020	IND	
Alex J. Tyler	2023	IND	

== See also ==
- Bomi County House of Representatives districts
  - Bomi-1
  - Bomi-2
  - Bomi-3
