= 2021 Liberian by-elections =

The 2021 Liberian by-elections were held on November 16 in the following House districts: Bomi-1, Bong-2, Grand Gedeh-1, and Nimba-1. The vacancies in the House were caused by four sitting representatives winning seats the 2020 Senate election. The 2021 by-elections were delayed beyond constitutional limits. Neither the ruling Coalition for Democratic Change nor the major opposition alliance Collaborating Political Parties won seats in the 2021 by-election. The elected House members were Finda Gborie Lansanah (Bomi-1), James M. Kolleh (Bong-2), Erol Madison Gwion (Grand Gedeh-1), and Samuel N. Brown (Nimba-1).

== Background ==
The 2020 Liberian Senate election was held on December 8. In the election, the ruling Coalition for Democratic Change (CDC) had ten losing candidates, with the major opposition alliance the Collaborating Political Parties (CPP) gaining six seats, the most of any party in the election. Four of the senators-elect were sitting members of the House, creating four House vacancies. Prince Moye won the Senate seat for Bong County and was certificated by the National Elections Commission (NEC) on January 6, 2021. The NEC received a notice from the House regarding the resultant vacancy in the Bong-2 district on February 4. The House sent a notification to the NEC of a vacancy in Grand Gedeh-1 on February 18, as result of Zoe Pennue's election to the Senate. Edwin Snowe was certificated on February 22, following a Supreme Court ruling, resulting in a vacancy in the Bomi-1 district. The House sent notification of the Bomi vacancy on February 23. After another Supreme Court ruling, Jeremiah Koung was certificated by the NEC on April 13, with the House sending a Nimba-1 vacancy notification to the NEC on April 21.

By April 22, Henry Karmo of FrontPage Africa had reported a potential delay in regard to the by-elections due to funding challenges. On May 31, 2021, an aspiring candidate for the Bong House seat, James Saybay, had filed a petition with the Supreme Court against the NEC for not having conducted the 2021 by-election. As reported by the New Republic Liberia, he argued that there was no "evidence of attempts to conduct the necessary by-elections." This is despite the fact that the Constitution stipulates that by-elections must be held within a maximum of 120 days of the vacancy's creation.

On July 22, NEC Chairwoman Davidetta Browne Lansanah announced that there were funding challenges which delayed the by-elections, but that the NEC had since received most of the necessary funds and expected to conduct the by-elections soon. She also announced the NEC had requested to hold the elections on the same date. On August 17, President George Weah had sent a proposal to the Senate, requesting a joint resolution to hold the by-elections by November 16. In August, the Senate concurred with the House to hold the by-elections by November 16, while adding a caveat that the by-election delay be attributed to the COVID-19 pandemic.

Candidate nomination for the by-elections took place between September 13 and September 24. There were 33 candidates in total between the four House districts, with only two of the candidates being women. Campaigning began on October 15 and ended on November 14. Election day was scheduled for November 16.

=== Bomi County candidates ===
There were nine candidates in the Bomi-1 election: Obediah Kpakpa Varney of the Liberia Restoration Party (LRP), Charles S. Brown of the CPP, Seh Maxwell Vincent of the Liberian People's Party (LPP), John D. Karmo of the Liberia National Union (LINU), Roosevelt Alvin Tulay Sr. of the People's Unification Party (PUP), as well as independent candidates Finda Gborie Lansanah, Armah Vanah Boakai II, Edwin Folley McGill, and Harry Buster Sando Sr.

Varney was a member of the Liberia People's Democratic Party (LPDP), itself a member of the ruling CDC coalition. According to the LPDP, Varney had won a CDC primary to contest the Bomi seat in the primary before the CDC announced it would not field a candidate in the Bomi by-election. FrontPage Africa reported that CDC leader George Weah had respected a request from Senator Edwin Snowe not to run a candidate in Bomi County, and instead back Lansanah's candidacy. Snowe had heavily supported Finda Gborie Lansanah's husband, the late Senator Lahai Gbabye Lansanah, and in the 2021 by-election, Snowe supported her. The CDC had also faced a notable loss in the 2020 Senate election in Bomi County, so victory in the by-election seemed unlikely. The LPDP claimed it was not consulted by in regard to the decision to not contest the Bomi by-election.

According to Liberia Public Radio, CPP candidate Charles Brown's campaign had less financial backing than Varney's and Lansanah's.

=== Bong County candidates ===
There were twelve candidates in the Bong-2 election: James Kolleh of the PUP, Melvin Salvage of the CDC, Joshua Better of the CPP, James Mulbah Tartor of the Movement for Progressive Change (MPC), Lawunkono Jefferson Blackie of the Rainbow Alliance (RA), James Saybay of the LRP, Matthew Siakor Jr. of the LINU, Joe K. Better with the Movement for One Liberia (MOL), as well as independent candidates Edward Emmanuel Gboe, Jerry Kerkulah Kollie, James F. Mulbah Totaye Ngenda, and Paasewe Yarkpawolo Jr.

Senator Prince Moye backed Joshua Better, his former chief of office staff, to succeed him the House. Vice President Jewel Taylor, a member of the CDC from Bong County, campaigned for Salvage. Taylor was a member the National Patriotic Party (NPP), a constituent party of the CDC. While Salvage saw support from the NPP, due to internal division in the CDC, he was less supported by the Congress for Democratic Change, the CDC constituent party led by President Weah.

=== Grand Gedeh County candidates ===
There were six candidates in the Grand Gedeh-1 election: Erol Madison Gwion of the LRP, Jeremiah Sokan of the CDC, Ansu Dukuly of the CPP, Seward Sohn of the LINU, George Nyan Yah of the RA, and Fester Jarbah Saydee of the PUP.

The CDC did not hold a primary election in Grand Gedeh, instead directly nominating Sokan. In response, Gwion, who had been a member of the CDC prior to the election, defected to the LRP to run in the by-election. Grand Gedeh County had been a stronghold for the CDC, or its founding constituent party the Congress for Democratic Change, since the 2005 election. No major official of the CPP campaigned for Duluky.

=== Nimba County candidates ===
There were six candidates in the Nimba-1 election: Francis Nya Maweah of the Movement for Democracy and Reconstruction (MDR), Lawrence Sua of the CPP, Abigail B. L. Freeman of the MOL, Zawolo Lakpoh Dahn of the LRP, Larry Lombaye Teah Sr. of the United People's Party (UPP), and independent candidate Samuel N. Brown.

Senator Prince Johnson was the leader of the MDR. According to Liberia Public Radio, "Senator Johnson has over time been very instrumental in bringing lot of candidates to the legislature given his popularity in the county." At this time, the CDC and MDR were allied. While Samuel Brown was a member of the NPP, a CDC constituent party, Johnson warned the CDC against supporting Brown's candidacy, or Johnson would revoke his support for the party before the 2023 elections. The CDC saw Johnson's support in 2023 as important and decided to support the MDR candidate Maweah instead of running their own. The NPP did not approve of the CDC's decision not to support Samuel Brown and supported Brown regardless. Brown also was backed by the PUP.

By late October, Abigail Freeman, the only woman running in the Nimba County election, complained to the NEC and Liberian National Police in regard to allegations of violence and humiliation against her perpetrated by Samuel Brown supporters. She claimed Brown supporters were throwing rocks at her and her vehicle during campaign activities. A female candidate in the 2020 Senate election in Nimba County, Edith Gongloe-Weh, had made similar complaints earlier in regard to Prince Johnson supporters.

== Aftermath ==
The by-elections were all held on the same day, November 16. According to the U.S. State Department's 2021 Country Report on Human Rights Practices for Liberia, "election observers deemed the proceedings largely peaceful, although there were some reported instances of vote tampering, intimidation, harassment of female candidates, and election violence." The Liberia Elections Observation Network reported various irregularities at a few observed polling places in Bomi County, including missing electoral materials and ballot boxes that were not demonstrated to have been empty prior to the election.

On November 18, the NEC declared the winners for the by-elections. They were as follows: Kolleh in Bomi, Lansanah in Bong, Gwion in Grand Gedeh, and Samuel Brown in Nimba. The two major parties, the ruling CDC and opposition CPP saw no victories in the four elections. News Public Trust attributed the CDC's failures in part due to "bad governance and worsening economic situation" during the Weah administration. Liberia Public Radio pointed to internal conflict in both parties. In the CPP in particular, Alexander B. Cummings Jr. and Joseph Boakai were competing with each other over the position of standard bearer.

Lansanah and Samuel Brown were certificated by the NEC on December 1. Gwion was certificated on December 14. By December 22, Salvage had submitted a complaint to the NEC against the declared winner in Bomi County, Kolleh. Salvage alleged fraud and irregularities. On December 23, an NEC hearing officer dismissed Salvage's complaint in a final NEC ruling, concluding Salvage's claims did not reach the burden of proof required. On February 1, 2022, the Supreme Court dismissed Salvage's complaints. Kolleh was certificated on February 4.

== Results ==
The following are the results for the 2021 by-elections from the NEC.

2021 Bomi County 1st House District By-election
Candidate	Party	Votes	%
Finda Gborie Lansanah	Independent	3,945	42.17
J. Kpakpa Obediah Varney	Liberia Restoration Party	3,229	34.51
Charles S. Brown	Collaborating Political Parties	1,224	13.08
Seh Maxwell Vincent	Liberian People's Party	240	2.57
Armah Vanah Boakai II	Independent	222	2.37
Edwin Folley McGill	Independent	213	2.28
John D. Karmo	Liberia National Union	134	1.43
Roosevelt Alvin Tulay Sr.	People's Unification Party	86	0.92
Harry Buster Sando Sr.	Independent	63	0.67
Total		9,356	100.00
Valid votes		9,356	97.62
Invalid/blank votes		228	2.38
Total votes		9,584	100.00
IND hold			

2021 Bong County 2nd House District By-election
Candidate	Party	Votes	%
James M. Kolleh	People's Unification Party	4,283	33.28
Melvin K. Salvage	Coalition for Democratic Change	3,882	30.17
Edward Emmanuel Gboe	Independent	2,497	19.40
Joshua D. K. Better	Collaborating Political Parties	798	6.20
James Mulbah Tartor	Movement for Progressive Change	308	2.39
Lawunkono Jefferson Blackie	Rainbow Alliance	270	2.10
Jerry Kerkulah Kollie	Independent	263	2.04
James F. Mulbah Totaye Ngenda	Independent	243	1.89
James Karpee Saybay	Liberia Restoration Party	147	1.14
Matthew Siakor Jr.	Liberia National Union	110	0.85
Joe K. Better	Movement for One Liberia	36	0.28
Paasewe Yarkpawolo Jr.	Independent	31	0.24
Total		12,868	100.00
Valid votes		12,868	95.57
Invalid/blank votes		596	4.43
Total votes		13,464	100.00
PUP gain from CPP			

2021 Grand Gedeh County 1st House District By-election
Candidate	Party	Votes	%
Erol Madison Gwion Sr.	Liberia Restoration Party	3,404	47.58
Jeremiah Garwo Sokan Sr.	Coalition for Democratic Change	2,698	37.71
Ansu Dukuly	Collaborating Political Parties	494	6.91
Seward Sohn	Liberia National Union	199	2.78
George Nyan Yah	Rainbow Alliance	181	2.53
Fester Jarbah Saydee	People's Unification Party	178	2.49
Total		7,154	100.00
Valid votes		7,154	97.31
Invalid/blank votes		198	2.69
Total votes		7,352	100.00
LRP gain from CDC			

2021 Nimba County 1st House District By-election
Candidate	Party	Votes	%
Samuel Nyakemah Brown Sr.	Independent	6,594	55.04
Francis Nya Maweah	Movement for Democracy and Reconstruction	3,428	28.61
Lawrence Sua	Collaborating Political Parties	995	8.31
Abigail B. L. Freeman	Movement for One Liberia	353	2.95
Zawolo Lakpoh Dahn	Liberia Restoration Party	321	2.68
Larry Lombaye Teah Sr.	United People's Party	289	2.41
Total		11,980	100.00
Valid votes		11,980	96.83
Invalid/blank votes		392	3.17
Total votes		12,372	100.00
IND gain from MDR			
