= Bomi-2 =

Electoral district in Liberia

- Constituency for the House of Representatives of Liberia
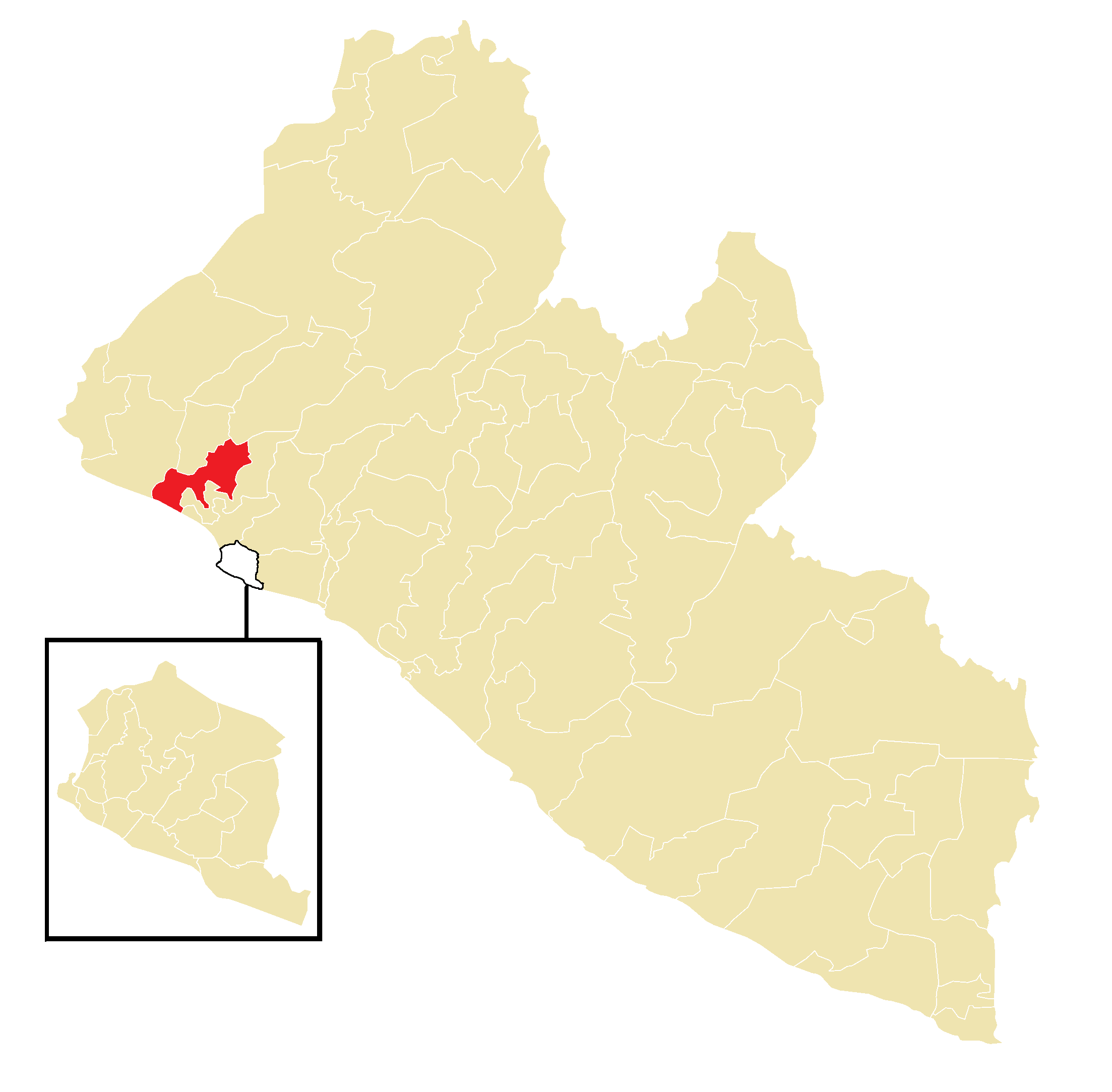
- Electorate: 19,143 (2023)

Current constituency
- Created: 2011
- Representative: Manah Bishop Johnson, Jr.

Bomi-2 is an electoral district for the elections to the House of Representatives of Liberia. The district covers the Klay District (except Gonjeh community), as well as the Maher community of Senjeh District and 4 communities of Dewoin District - Beh, Gbaigbon, Vortor and Manjama.

== Elected representatives ==
Year	Representative elected	Party	Notes
2005	Haja Fata Siryon	NDPL	
2011	Alex J. Tyler	UP	
2017	Manah Bishop Johnson, Jr.	CDC	
2023	Manah Bishop Johnson, Jr.	UP	

== Election results ==
2005 Bomi County's 2nd House District Election
Candidate	Party	Votes	%
Haja Fata Siryon	National Democratic Party of Liberia	2,530	28.68
Ballah K. M. Davis Jr.	New Deal Movement	1,388	15.74
David Momolu Wiles	Coalition for the Transformation of Liberia	908	10.29
Musu Foley Manubah	Labor Party of Liberia	898	10.18
John I. Gbellay Sr.	Unity Party	776	8.80
A. J. Armah Karneh	All Liberia Coalition Party	583	6.61
Adama Boimah Samolah	Congress for Democratic Change	373	4.23
M. Khalifa Jabateh	National Reformation Party	358	4.06
Joseph Bamgongo Kemokai	Liberia Destiny Party	354	4.01
George M. Zenneh	Liberty Party	346	3.92
Daniel Amadu Golanyon	National Patriotic Party	187	2.12
Daouda V. Sheriff	Progressive Democratic Party	120	1.36
Total		8,821	100.00
Valid votes		8,821	94.56
Invalid/blank votes		507	5.44
Total votes		9,328	100.00

2011 Bomi County's 2nd House District Election
Candidate	Party	Votes	%
Alex J. Tyler	Unity Party	3,976	35.34
Manah Bishop Johnson Sr.	National Democratic Coalition	1,986	17.65
Bai J. Anderson	Liberty Party	1,474	13.10
Henry A. K. Morgan	Congress for Democratic Change	964	8.57
Lance T. G. Beer	Independent	736	6.54
Alphanso Varma Kamara	Liberia Transformation Party	709	6.30
Momolu Quoi Kamara	Citizens Unification Party	449	3.99
Wilhelmina Karnley Fahn	Independent	419	3.72
Doris Maimah Coleman Weefar	National Union for Democratic Progress	372	3.31
Paultomo D. S. Brown	Grassroot Democratic Party of Liberia	167	1.48
Total		11,252	100.00
Valid votes		11,252	94.40
Invalid/blank votes		667	5.60
Total votes		11,919	100.00

2017 Bomi County's 2nd House District Election
Candidate	Party	Votes	%
Manah Bishop Johnson Jr.	Coalition for Democratic Change	2,561	20.81
J. Omasco S. Karmo Sr.	United People's Party	1,445	11.74
Faliku G. Sarnor	Independent	1,358	11.03
Alfred B. S. Zinnah	Alternative National Congress	1,324	10.76
John Nelson Bogar	All Liberian Party	1,036	8.42
Boima M. Bernard Jr.	People's Unification Party	957	7.77
Amos Armah Fully	Liberty Party	718	5.83
Alfred Boimah Sirleaf	Coalition for Liberia's Progress	535	4.35
Ciata Antoinette Bishop	Victory for Change Party	375	3.05
Clarence D. Adamah	Redemption Democratic Congress	362	2.94
Wilmot G. Johnson	Liberian People's Party	354	2.88
Bai J. Anderson	Liberia Transformation Party	325	2.64
A. Varney Sando Sr.	True Whig Party	273	2.22
Christopher Siaffa Browne	Liberia National Union	262	2.13
Thomas Washington	Vision for Liberia Transformation	200	1.62
Rebbacca T. Benson	Movement for Economic Empowerment	158	1.28
Jemeon A. Sando	Democratic Justice Party	66	0.54
Total		12,309	100.00
Valid votes		12,309	96.29
Invalid/blank votes		474	3.71
Total votes		12,783	100.00
