= Bong-5 =

Electoral district in Liberia

- Constituency for the House of Representatives of Liberia
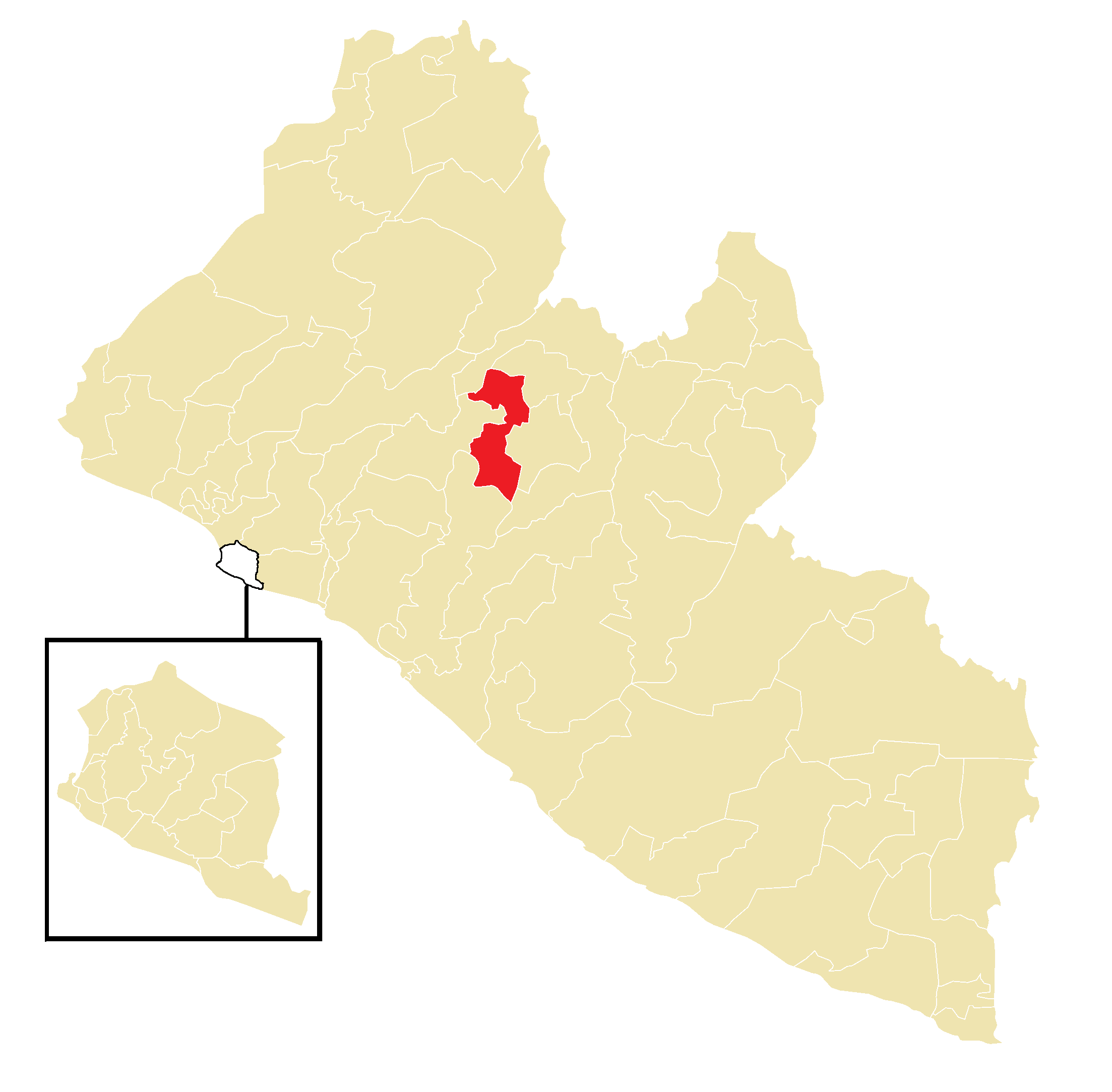
- Electorate: 32,051 (2023)

Current constituency
- Created: 2011
- Representative: Eugine J. M. Kollie

Bong-5 is an electoral district for the elections to the House of Representatives of Liberia. The constituency covers Suakoko District and five communities of Yeallequelleh District (i.e. Gbartala, Palala, Fenutoli, Garyea and Tomgbeyah).

== Elected representatives ==
Year	Representative elected	Party	Notes
2005	Tokpah J. Mulbah	CDC	
2011	Edward W. Karfiah	NDC	
2017	Edward W. Karfiah	PUP	
2023	Eugine J. M. Kollie	CDC	

== Election results ==
2005 Bong County's 5th House District Election
Candidate	Party	Votes	%
Tokpah J. Mulbah	Congress for Democratic Change	6,193	32.00
Adolphus Besman Gborgar Zackpah	Independent	3,639	18.80
John Alvin Blackie	National Reformation Party	2,891	14.94
Moses Fineboy Gonkpalah	Coalition for the Transformation of Liberia	2,223	11.49
Dekpah Jacob Gueh	Liberty Party	2,207	11.40
Jackson Saye Gweh	Unity Party	2,201	11.37
Total		19,354	100.00
Valid votes		19,354	94.15
Invalid/blank votes		1,203	5.85
Total votes		20,557	100.00

2011 Bong County's 5th House District Election
Candidate	Party	Votes	%
Edward W. Karfiah	National Democratic Coalition	2,933	20.14
Blyden Kennedy	Independent	2,258	15.51
G. Samuel K. S. Bondo	National Democratic Party of Liberia	1,674	11.50
G. Martin Dumoe	National Patriotic Party	1,497	10.28
Lawrence Mulbah Jackson	Liberia Transformation Party	1,217	8.36
Joe K. Williams	Victory for Change Party	1,107	7.60
Viola Nyamah Cooper	Unity Party	1,062	7.29
James Michael Sondah	Congress for Democratic Change	720	4.95
Daniel B. Faijue	Independent	619	4.25
Alphonso K. B. Diggs	Liberty Party	539	3.70
Emmanuel Jimmy Korkoyah	Independent	387	2.66
Tommy N. Wennah	Movement for Progressive Change	322	2.21
Edwin Brown Quetole	National Union for Democratic Progress	225	1.55
Total		14,560	100.00
Valid votes		14,560	88.86
Invalid/blank votes		1,826	11.14
Total votes		16,386	100.00

2017 Bong County's 5th House District Election
Candidate	Party	Votes	%
Edward W. Karfiah (Incumbent)	People's Unification Party	6,506	29.06
Silas K. Siakor	Independent	4,658	20.80
Peter K. Flomo	Alternative National Congress	3,560	15.90
James D. Na-Kulah Sao	Coalition for Liberia's Progress	2,612	11.67
J. Lepolu Torlon	Liberty Party	1,657	7.40
G. Samuel K. S. Bondo	All Liberian Party	886	3.96
Jesse Oliver S. Gonkpah	Movement for Democracy and Reconstruction	594	2.65
A. Mhulbah Kornomugie	Movement for Economic Empowerment	546	2.44
Joseph S. Gbemelen	United People's Party	406	1.81
Thomas J. Pluato	Coalition for Democratic Change	362	1.62
Albert Toukolon	Liberia Transformation Party	318	1.42
Joe L. Williams	Victory for Change Party	150	0.67
Martin Kerkula Sando	True Whig Party	136	0.61
Total		22,391	100.00
Valid votes		22,391	94.68
Invalid/blank votes		1,259	5.32
Total votes		23,650	100.00
