= Finda Gborie Lansanah =

Liberian politician

Finda Alice Gborie Lansanah is a Liberian politician.

== Biography ==
Lansanah is the widow of Lahai Lansanah, who represented Bomi County in the Senate of Liberia during the 52nd Legislature.

In 2020, Representative Edwin Snowe, from Bomi County's 1st House district, was elected to the Senate. Senator Snowe endorsed Lansanah to fill his vacancy in the House of Representatives of Liberia by-election for Bomi County. Lansanah's husband was Snowe's campaign manager in 2020. She was also supported by Sister AID Liberia. Lansanah ran as an independent. Lansanah won the nine-way election. She was sworn in December 2021.

Lansanah was defeated in her attempt at re-election in 2023 by Jahkpakpa Obediah Varney.
