= Bomi-3 =

Electoral district in Liberia

- Constituency for the House of Representatives of Liberia
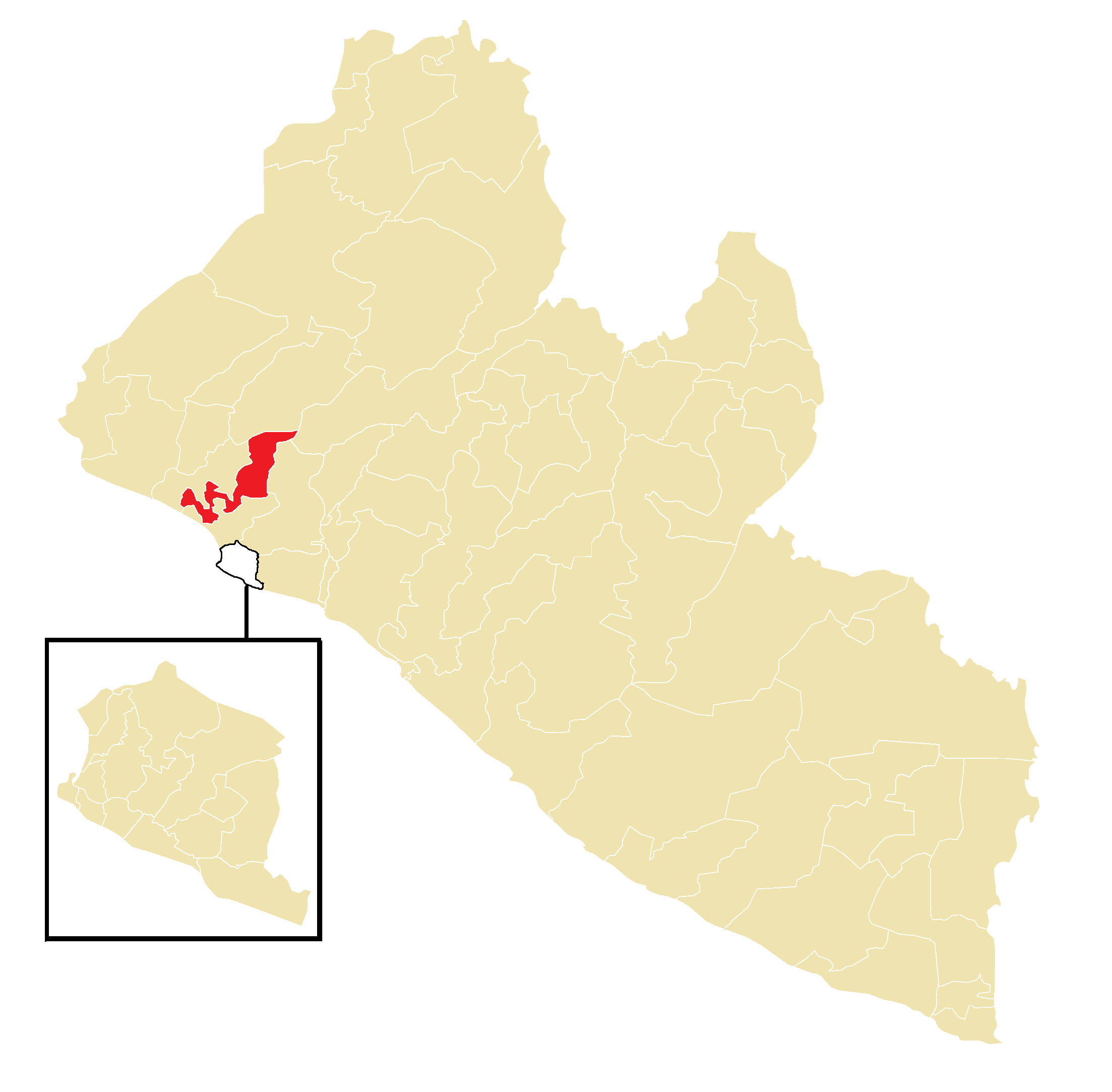
- Electorate: 24,733 (2023)

Current constituency
- Created: 2011
- Representative: Sam P. Jallah

Bomi-3 is an electoral district for the elections to the House of Representatives of Liberia. The district covers the Seuhn Mecca District, parts of Dewoin District (i.e. the communities of Bonor, Benda, Zohn Bamon, Bowein, Vincent, Jenneh, Bogbeh, Leyan, Dagweh and Weajor) as well as the Gonjeh community of Klay District.

== Elected representatives ==
Year	Representative elected	Party	Notes
2005	Tarnue H. Cooper	CDC	
2011	Haja F. Siryon	UP	
2017	Haja F. Siryon	PUP	
2023	Sam P. Jallah	IND	

== Elections results ==
2005 Bomi County's 3rd House District Election
Candidate	Party	Votes	%
Tarnue H. Cooper	Congress for Democratic Change	2,530	30.75
Ernest Gray Davis	Coalition for the Transformation of Liberia	1,649	20.04
Joseph Boakai Holmes Jr.	New Deal Movement	1,223	14.87
Gbilley Dougba Karnley	National Patriotic Party	898	10.92
John Zoebohn Kollie	Liberty Party	614	7.46
Sando Gaiyah Sirleaf	Liberia Destiny Party	592	7.20
Oretha Maviayer Tipayson	Reformed United Liberia Party	452	5.49
Seth Momo Tarweh	Progressive Democratic Party	269	3.27
Total		8,227	100.00
Valid votes		8,227	91.54
Invalid/blank votes		760	8.46
Total votes		8,987	100.00

2011 Bomi County's 3rd House District Election
Candidate	Party	Votes	%
Haja F. Siryon	Unity Party	4,996	45.25
Ballah K. M. Davis Jr.	National Democratic Party of Liberia	2,076	18.80
Faliku G. Sarnor	Congress for Democratic Change	961	8.70
Ballah Walee Bue Sr.	Liberty Party	883	8.00
Wahab Maliki Dorley	Liberia Destiny Party	675	6.11
Gorden Stanley Karpeh	Alliance for Peace and Democracy	665	6.02
D. Amadu Golanyon	National Patriotic Party	568	5.14
C. Mohammed Sotee	Republican Party of Liberia	113	1.02
Christian Bai Helb	Liberia Transformation Party	103	0.93
Total		11,040	100.00
Valid votes		11,040	95.17
Invalid/blank votes		560	4.83
Total votes		11,600	100.00

2017 Bomi County's 3rd House District Election
Candidate	Party	Votes	%
Haja F. Siryon (Incumbent)	People's Unification Party	4,567	30.04
Varney Ali Sirleaf	Coalition for Liberia's Progress	3,500	23.02
John King McGill	Liberty Party	1,359	8.94
Zwannah Wesley Johnson	Movement for Economic Empowerment	1,145	7.53
Gbelly V. Barmor	Coalition for Democratic Change	1,110	7.30
Gorden Stanley Karpeh	United People's Party	949	6.24
Mulbah Blamah Gray Sr.	All Liberian Party	652	4.29
Amadu K. F. Sarnor	Alternative National Congress	623	4.10
Stephen Varney Moore	Victory for Change Party	380	2.50
Edward Boima Clarke Sr.	Independent	322	2.12
Elizabeth Zoe Addy	Liberia Transformation Party	271	1.78
Boakai Karnley	True Whig Party	185	1.22
Ovetta Kulah Peal	Change Democratic Action	56	0.37
Sando Bah Normon	Liberia Restoration Party	49	0.32
Mohammed D. K. Kanneh	Liberian People's Party	36	0.24
Total		15,204	100.00
Valid votes		15,204	96.39
Invalid/blank votes		569	3.61
Total votes		15,773	100.00
