= Musa Bility =

Liberian politician

Musa Hassan Bility

Member of the House of Representatives of Liberia
- Incumbent
- Assumed office 2024
- Preceded by: Roger S. W. Y. Domah
- Constituency: Nimba-7

Personal details
- Born: April 6, 1967 (age 59) Saclepea, Liberia
- Party: Citizens Movement for Change
- Other political affiliations: UP (before 2016); LP (2016-2024); Independent (2024-2025)

Musa Hassan Bility (born April 6, 1967) is a Liberian politician and businessman. Bility held a number of government positions in the administration of President Ellen Johnson Sirleaf. Bility also served as president of the Liberian Football Association from 2010 to 2018. He sought the FIFA presidency in the 2016 election, but his candidacy was suspended after he failed an integrity check. He received a 10-year ban from FIFA in 2019.

In 2016, Bility joined the Liberty Party. He was elected chairman of the party in 2021. There was a leadership crisis in the party due to a conflict between him and political leader Nyonblee Karnga-Lawrence. Bility was elected to the House of Representatives of Liberia in 2023. In September 2024, Bility resigned as chairman and as a member of the Liberty Party.

In March 2025, Bility founded the Citizens Movement for Change, a party he serves as the first leader of.

== Biography ==
Musa Bility was born on April 6, 1967, in Saclepea in Nimba County. His mother was Muasia Dulleh Bility. His maternal grandmother was from a notable Mano family. He is of the Mandingo ethnicity and of the Islamic faith. He earned a degree in economics from African Methodist Episcopal Zion University in Monrovia in 2008. As a businessman, Bility has owned a number of companies, including the media company Renaissance Communications Inc., which runs Truth FM Radio, Real TV, and Renaissance Newspaper. He also owns Srimex, which by 2015 was Liberia's largest oil importing firm.

Bility was an early supporter of Ellen Johnson Sirleaf in the 2005 presidential election. During the 2011 election, Bility used his media company to support President Sirleaf's re-election campaign. Bility was given various government appoints under the Sirleaf administration including to bodies such as the National Port Authority, the Liberia Water and Sewer Corporations, and the Liberia Airport Authority. In 2013 during his time at the Liberia Airport Authority, Bility, along with small group, was indicted for, among other things, economic sabotage and criminal conspiracy. The charges against him were dropped in October 2015, two years after they were made, after the government failed to prosecute.

=== Football ===
On March 20, 2010, Bility was elected president of the Liberian Football Association (LFA). At the time of his election, he was serving as president of the Watanga FC. In 2011, Bility was one of the few Africans to vote against Sepp Blatter for president of FIFA, instead backing Mohammed bin Hammam's candidacy. He was re-elected as president of the LFA in 2014. Under Bility's LFA presidency, on multiple occasions including in 2013, 2016, and 2017, the LFA failed to pay its employees on time, delaying payment for a duration spanning months.

On August 13, 2011, Bility was elected to serve as a vice president of the West African Football Union (WAFU). He was re-elected unopposed in 2016. By 2013, Bility had been elected to serve as a member of the executive committee of the Confederation of African Football (CAF). On May 2, 2013, Bility was banned by CAF from all football activity for six months. According to the BBC, he had "violated statutes relating to the use of confidential documents" after fighting a rule change which would allow for the unopposed re-election of CAF President Issa Hayatou. The ban was lifted on September 23.

In October 2015, Bility submitted his candidacy for the FIFA presidency. He was the second person to declare his candidacy for the 2016 election after Zico. He was the second African ever to run for the FIFA presidency. His candidacy was not backed by CAF. His campaign manager was former Liberian Speaker of the House Edwin Snowe. In November 2015, Bility was excluded from the election due to failing an integrity check. Bility attempted to appeal the decision to exclude him through the Court of Arbitration for Sport (CAS). The reasoning behind the exclusion was not initially made public. In a letter sent by the FIFA electoral committee, a number of reasons for his exclusion were outlined, including his 2013 CAF suspension, the fact that his company Srimex was convicted for tax evasion, and the dismissed Liberia Airport Authority indictment.

Bility transferred the LFA presidency to Mustapha Raji in September 2018, after Raji was elected unopposed. In July 2019, following an investigation of Bility started in May 2018, FIFA banned him for 10 years and charged him US$500,000 in fines due to a violation of the FIFA code of ethics. Allegations against Bility included misappropriating FIFA funds, both annual grants as well as a grant intended to go toward an Ebola prevention campaign, conflicts of interest, and offering and accepting gifts. In May 2023, after an attempt to appeal the decision, his ban was upheld by the CAS.

=== Liberty Party chairman ===
Bility resigned from the Unity Party (UP) in October 2016, near the end of the Sirleaf presidency. He joined the Liberty Party (LP). In a convention on January 23, 2021, Bility was elected chairman of the LP, replacing Steve Zargo. At the time of the election, Bility was serving as LP chairman of the national advisory council. He was the first Mandingo chairman of the LP, a party typically associated with the Bassa ethnicity. Some founding members of the LP, including former chairman Aruna Fallah and J. Lemuel Gbadyu, were against his election due to his alleged corruption.

By December 2021, there was conflict with in the LP between Chairman Bility and the LP Political Leader Nyonblee Karnga-Lawrence, with factions forming around the two party leaders. The Karnga-Lawrence faction was larger. Before Bility's chairmanship, the LP had been a founding member of the political alliance known as the Collaborating Political Parties (CPP). In March 2022, the Karnga-Lawrence faction of the LP attempted to leave the CPP, but Bility, as chairman, was able to keep the LP officially within the CPP. With only the Bility faction of the LP and the Alternative National Congress left in the alliance, Bility was made CPP chairman in August 2022. In April 2024, the CPP was dissolved.

The LP leadership crisis, involving disputes related to the LP constitution, resulted in a Supreme Court case decided in April 2023. While the Supreme Court ruling lacked finality in regard to the legal questions at hand, the Bility faction declared it a victory in their favor.

In September 2024, Bility resigned as chairman and as a member of the LP. He did so during and because of the reconciliation process of the party. Representative Rugie Yatu Barry took over as chairman after Bility's resignation.

=== House of Representatives ===
Bility was elected to the House of Representatives of Liberia in the 2023 election to represent Nimba County's 7th district on the CPP ticket. He defeated incumbent representative Roger S. W. Y. Domah. Bility sought the position of speaker of the House. His bid for speaker was supported by Senator Prince Johnson. The speaker election was won by Jonathan F. Koffa.

By December 2023, Bility had made a statement rejecting the establishment of a war crimes court in Liberia. By February 2024, Bility presented a bill to the House to amend the nationality laws of Liberia. Among other things, the bill seeks to remove the restrictions from elected office placed on natural born citizens of Liberia who had obtained dual citizenship. The bill unanimously passed the House by September 2024.

On March 1, 2025, the Citizens Movement for Change (CMC) was officially launched in Saclepea. The party was founded by Bility, and he was sworn in as its fist political leader. According to FrontPage Africa, the party is "positioning itself as a serious challenger" to the Movement for Democracy and Reconstruction (MDR). The MDR and the National Union for Democratic Progress, both parties founded by the late Senator Prince Johnson, have held a dominant position in Nimba County for the last 20 years. The party was certificated by the National Elections Commission on March 7.

On September 3, 2025, Bility announced his intention to run for president in the 2029 general election with the CMC.
