= Bomi-1 =

Electoral district in Liberia

- Constituency for the House of Representatives of Liberia
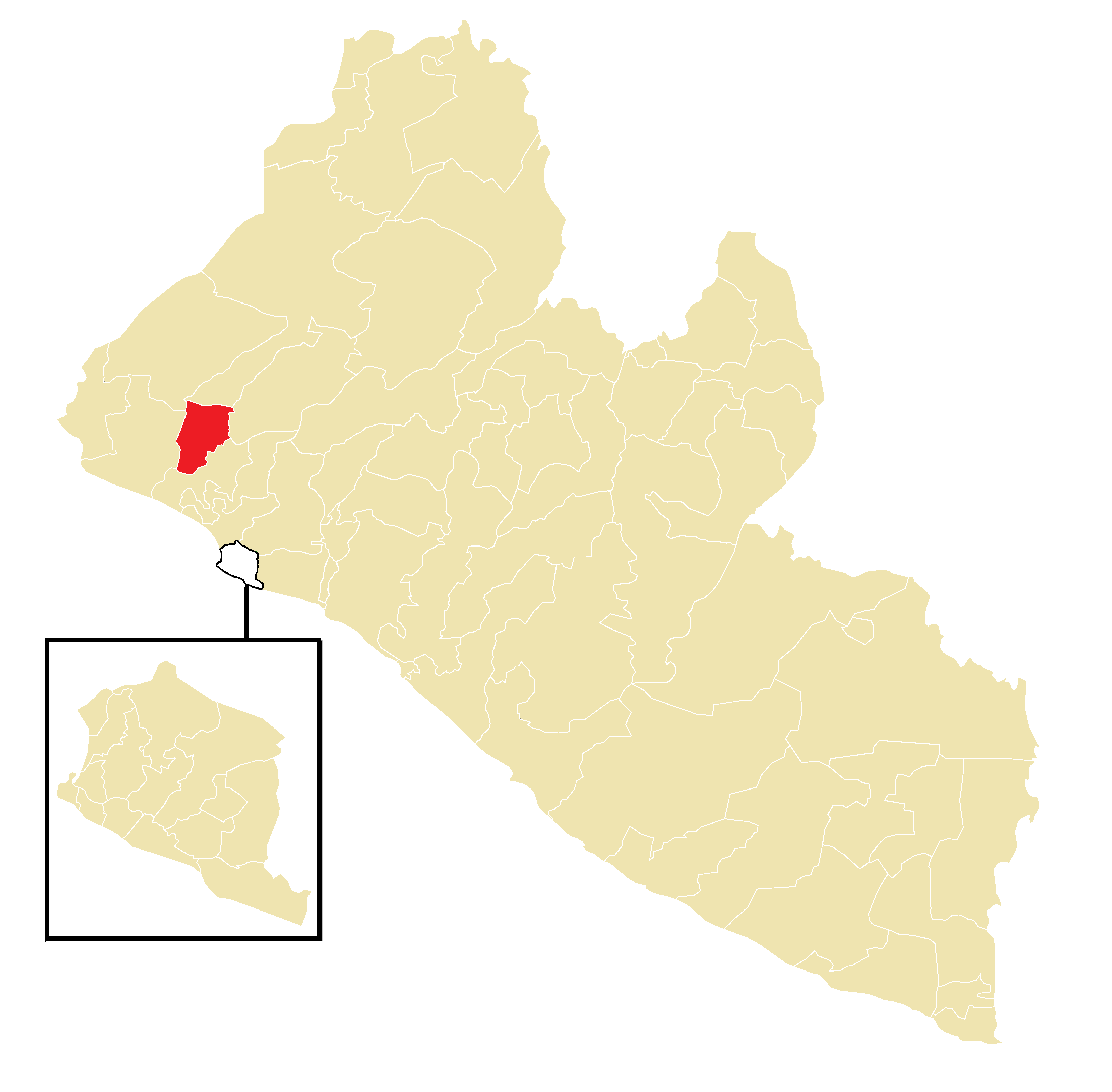
- Electorate: 19,236 (2023)

Current constituency
- Created: 2011
- Representative: Jahkpakpa Obediah Varney

Bomi-1 is an electoral district for the elections to the House of Representatives of Liberia. The district covers Tubmanburg City and Senjeh District (except for the Maher community).

== Elected representatives ==
Year	Representative elected	Party	Notes
2005	Alex J. Tyler	COTOL	
2011	Samuel G. Karmo	UP	
2017	Edwin M. Snowe, Jr.	UP	Resigned after elected to Senate.
2021	Finda Gborie Lansanah	IND	
2023	Jahkpakpa Obediah Varney	UP	

== Election results ==
2005 Bomi County's 1st House District Election
Candidate	Party	Votes	%
Alex J. Tyler	Coalition for the Transformation of Liberia	1,910	21.50
Jeru S. Brown	National Democratic Party of Liberia	1,466	16.50
Sylvester Kojuah Gray Sr.	National Reformation Party	1,341	15.09
Quaye Boimah Gray	Congress for Democratic Change	1,157	13.02
Miatta Richardson Yoryor	Unity Party	1,084	12.20
Alfred Blamah-Seh Zinnah	Liberty Party	1,067	12.01
Sando Samuel Boimah	National Patriotic Party	859	9.67
Total		8,884	100.00
Valid votes		8,884	91.50
Invalid/blank votes		825	8.50
Total votes		9,709	100.00

2011 Bomi County's 1st House District Election
Candidate	Party	Votes	%
Samuel G. Karmo	Unity Party	2,576	23.62
Tarnue H. Cooper	Congress for Democratic Change	1,999	18.33
Edwin Folley McGill	National Democratic Coalition	1,152	10.56
John H. Bedell	All Liberia Coalition Party	976	8.95
Ernest Gray Davis	Liberty Party	934	8.57
Ambulai A. Corneh	Victory for Change Party	586	5.37
Quaye Boimah Gray	Freedom Alliance Party of Liberia	484	4.44
Isaac Seh Kamara II	Movement for Progressive Change	462	4.24
Titus Saar	Liberia Destiny Party	453	4.15
Kelvin Bishop Fallah	Liberia Transformation Party	401	3.68
Lawrence A. K. Vincent	National Union for Democratic Progress	376	3.45
Clarence Vaitekeh Cooper	Union of Liberian Democrats	258	2.37
Aaron Crawford Devine	National Reformation Party	137	1.26
Urias Saah Davis	Grassroot Democratic Party of Liberia	110	1.01
Total		10,904	100.00
Valid votes		10,904	91.63
Invalid/blank votes		996	8.37
Total votes		11,900	100.00

2017 Bomi County's 1st House District Election
Candidate	Party	Votes	%
Edwin Snowe	Unity Party	10,711	67.42
Jah-Kpakpa O. Varney	Coalition for Democratic Change	1,868	11.76
Charles S. Brown	Liberty Party	1,628	10.25
Samuel G. Karmo (Incumbent)	Liberia Transformation Party	1,120	7.05
Timothy Saywroh Jones	United People's Party	307	1.93
Aaron C. Devine	Alternative National Congress	253	1.59
Total		15,887	100.00
Valid votes		15,887	95.52
Invalid/blank votes		745	4.48
Total votes		16,632	100.00

2021 Bomi County's 1st House District By-election
Candidate	Party	Votes	%
Finda Gborie Lansanah	Independent	3,945	42.17
J. Kpakpa Obediah Varney	Liberia Restoration Party	3,229	34.51
Charles S. Brown	Collaborating Political Parties	1,224	13.08
Seh Maxwell Vincent	Liberian People's Party	240	2.57
Armah Vanah Boakai II	Independent	222	2.37
Edwin Folley McGill	Independent	213	2.28
John D. Karmo	Liberia National Union	134	1.43
Roosevelt Alvin Tulay Sr.	People's Unification Party	86	0.92
Harry Buster Sando Sr.	Independent	63	0.67
Total		9,356	100.00
Valid votes		9,356	97.62
Invalid/blank votes		228	2.38
Total votes		9,584	100.00
