= Cooper Kruah =

Liberian politician

Cooper W. Kruah Sr. is a Liberian politician. He was appointed by President George Weah as minister of post and telecommunication in 2018. In 2023, he was dismissed from the position after attending an opposition political rally. He was initially nominated for the position of justice minister by President Joseph Boakai in 2024, but his nomination was dismissed, and he was then appointed labor minister.

By 2023, he was, and as of 2026 is still currently, serving as chairman of the Movement for Democracy and Reconstruction.

== Biography ==
Cooper Kruah is a lawyer. In the 2005 general election, Kruah unsuccessfully ran with the Alliance for Peace and Democracy for the Nimba County Senate seat. He was nominated by the Movement for Democracy and Reconstruction (MDR) to the House of Representatives in the 2017 general election. He unsuccessfully ran in Nimba County's 9th House district.

Kruah was appointed to serve as Minister for the Ministry Post & Telecommunication in the cabinet of President George Weah in February 2018. He was confirmed by the Senate in August 2018. He was the only Weah cabinet minister from Nimba County. In this position, Kruah was accused of having a conflict of interest by holding shares in the Universal Forestry Corporation. The company was established by Kruah in 1986, and according to The Daylight, was involved with the "unlawful extraction of minerals and timber". The company was also engaged with conflict lumber during Liberia's civil wars. In 2022, Kruah attempted to refute claims of conflict of interest by stating to have turned his shares over to his son in 2019. The DayLight pointed out this would still be a conflict of interest due to the familial relation and was unable to corroborate the transfer of the shares with the Liberian Revenue Authority.

In 2023, Kruah attended a political rally for the Unity Party (UP) presidential nominee Joseph Boakai. By this point, Kruah had become chairman of the MDR. Previous, the MDR was an ally of President Weah's party, the Coalition for Democratic Change (CDC). However, by 2023, the MDR had turned against the CDC, and the major opposition UP had nominated a member of the MDR for the vice presidency. After his rally attendance, Kruah was dismissed as cabinet minister by President Weah on May 1. MDR founder Prince Johnson characterized the dismissal as political retaliation. Kruah was replaced by Worlea-Saywah Dunah.

In January 2024, Kruah was nominated by President Boakai as justice minister. His nomination was withdrawn in February, following media reports of an investigation following a complaint filed in 2014, finding him guilty of unethical practices. Specifically, according to FrontPage Africa, Kruah committed "financial fraud and theft" as a lawyer against a client. The withdrawal of his cabinet nomination was done without public announcement.

President Boakai subsequently nominated Kruah as labor minister.
