= Dewoin =

Dewoin may be,

- Dewoin language
- Dewoin District

both in Liberia.
