= John Tarnue =

Liberian army commander

Brigadier John S. Tarnue is a former Liberian military officer. Tarnue was the Commanding General of the Armed Forces of Liberia (AFL) from 1999 to 2003 (Second Liberian Civil War). Tarnue lost his position in 2003 when Charles Taylor resigned from power.

== Travel ban by the United Nations ==
Tarnue's name was among 130 Liberian officials banned from travel in June 2001 by the United Nations Security Council during the Second Liberian Civil War.

== Honoring ==
Tarnue was among several former AFL officers honored on 25 July 2006 by the government of Liberia for honorable service.

== Land invasion allegation ==
Reverend Tijli Tarty Tyee alleged during testimony in front of the Truth and Reconciliation Commission of Liberia that Tarnue and the soldiers under his command invaded Tyee's land in 1999 while also severely beating Rev. Tyee. Tarnue's family alleged control of the land, citing a sale by Gabriel Duncan.

== Special Court for Sierra Leone ==
Tarnue testified against the Revolutionary United Front in front of the Special Court for Sierra Leone. Tarnue was portrayed as the "right-hand man" of former President Taylor. After testifying, Tarnue was relocated with his family to an undisclosed country.

== See also ==
- Lahai Gbabye Lansanah, former adjutant to Tarnue and Senior Senator from Bomi County
