= Montserrado-1 =

Electoral district in Liberia

- Constituency for the House of Representatives of Liberia
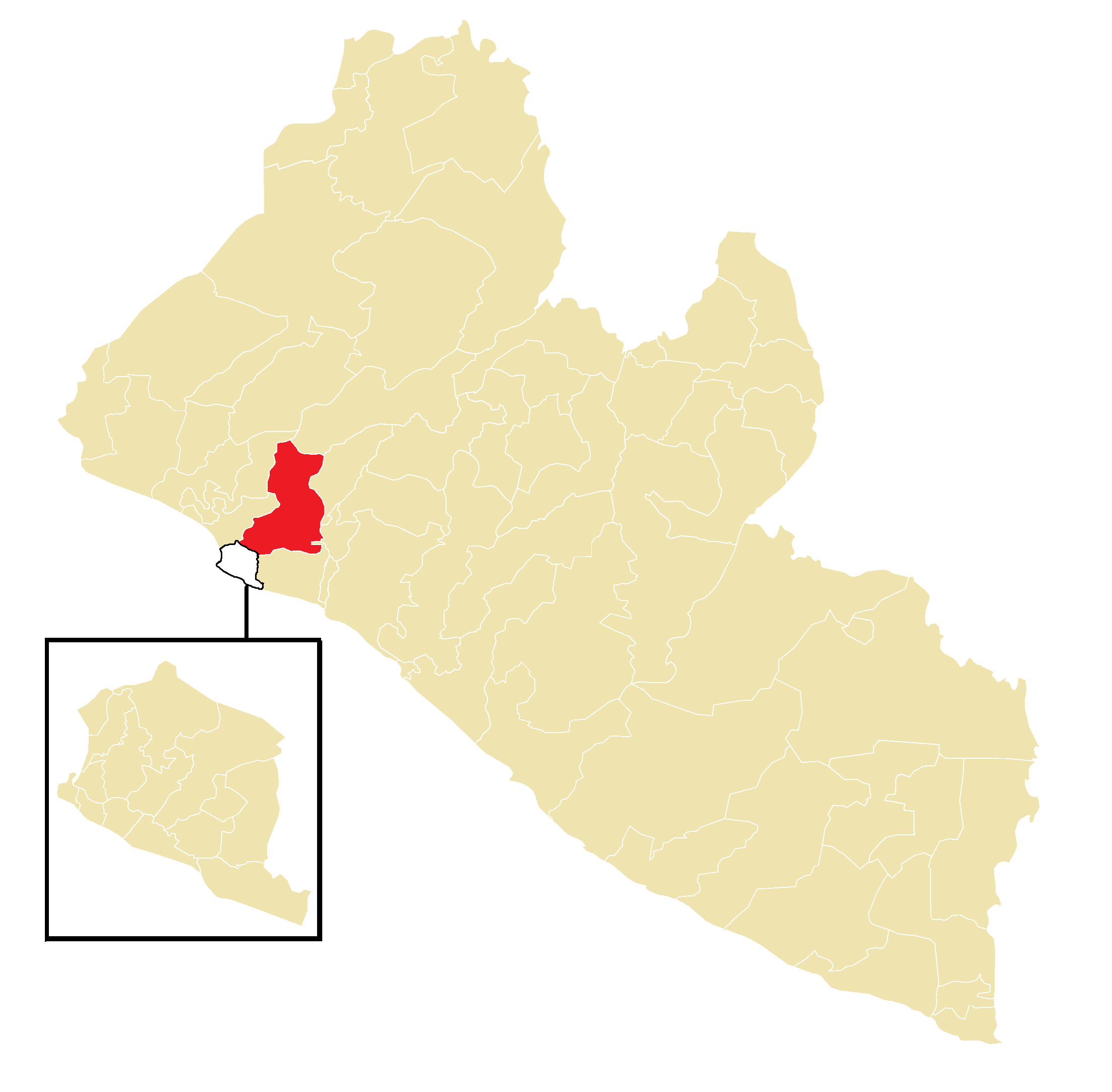
- Electorate: 56,614 (2023)

Current constituency
- Created: 2011
- Representative: Rugie Yatu Barry

Montserrado-1 is an electoral district for the elections to the House of Representatives of Liberia. The district covers Todee District and Careysburg District.

== Elected representatives ==
Year	Representative elected	Party	Notes
2005	Alomiza M. Ennos	CDC	
2011	Josephine M. G. Francis	UP	
2017	Lawrence Morris	Ind.	
2023	Rugie Yatu Barry	CPP	

== Election results ==
2005 Montserrado County's 1st House District Election
Candidate	Party	Votes	%
Alomiza M. Ennos	Congress for Democratic Change	11,104	41.87
Prince V. Mambu	Unity Party	3,618	13.64
Washington N. Blay	Coalition for the Transformation of Liberia	2,544	9.59
Abraham Jawara	Liberty Party	2,129	8.03
A. Blamoh Sieh	Alliance for Peace and Democracy	2,064	7.78
J. Henry Lloyd	Liberia Destiny Party	1,399	5.28
Emmanuel Manjoe Beer	National Patriotic Party	1,171	4.42
Madusu Matorma Kromah	All Liberia Coalition Party	757	2.85
Amos Teah Kofa	New Deal Movement	682	2.57
Lasana Kennedy Saryon	Progressive Democratic Party	573	2.16
Beatrice N. Joe	National Democratic Party of Liberia	478	1.80
Total		26,519	100.00
Valid votes		26,519	93.51
Invalid/blank votes		1,841	6.49
Total votes		28,360	100.00

2011 Montserrado County's 1st House District Election
Candidate	Party	Votes	%
Josephine M. G. Francis	Unity Party	2,763	12.23
Emmanuel D. Yarkpuzua	National Reformation Party	2,173	9.62
Harry Saye Gono	Movement for Progressive Change	1,918	8.49
James Martin Davies	Congress for Democratic Change	1,805	7.99
Rugie Yatu Barry	Liberty Party	1,674	7.41
F. Eva Johnson	Independent	1,658	7.34
Quita Bemah Kialain	Liberia Transformation Party	1,657	7.33
John Marshall Benjamin	Liberia Empowerment Party	1,539	6.81
Anthony Baysah Kollie	Citizens Unification Party	1,127	4.99
Sylvester G. Mulbah	Independent	1,071	4.74
Alunno MacAnthony Siaker	Liberia Restoration Party	845	3.74
Edwin Menlor Urey	Independent	811	3.59
George Kerkula Cooper	National Union for Democratic Progress	731	3.23
S. Josen Fahn	Alliance for Peace and Democracy	731	3.23
J. Modesco Siaker	Victory for Change Party	623	2.76
Ernest Ammons Gray	Independent	517	2.29
Rebekah Watta Kennedy Dargbeh	National Democratic Coalition	272	1.20
Calvin W. Campbell	Freedom Alliance Party of Liberia	239	1.06
Lawrence Shepherd	Original Congress Party of Liberia	235	1.04
John M. D. Dixon Sr.	Grassroot Democratic Party of Liberia	209	0.92
Total		22,598	100.00
Valid votes		22,598	90.93
Invalid/blank votes		2,254	9.07
Total votes		24,852	100.00

2017 Montserrado County's 1st House District Election
Candidate	Party	Votes	%
Lawrence Morris	Independent	4,709	16.12
Desire S. Satia	Independent	4,386	15.01
Sylvester G. Mulbah	Independent	2,671	9.14
Rugie Yatu Barry	Liberty Party	2,183	7.47
S. Josen Fahn	Liberia National Union	2,016	6.90
Josephine M. G. Francis (Incumbent)	Unity Party	1,843	6.31
Emmanuel Denia Yarkpazua	All Liberian Party	1,782	6.10
James Malley Varney	Coalition for Democratic Change	1,311	4.49
Woods A. Nyanton	Movement for Progressive Change	1,204	4.12
E. Jonathan Garnett	United People's Party	1,047	3.58
Shedrick A. Bettie Sr.	Independent	973	3.33
John Raymond Alpha	Democratic Justice Party	952	3.26
Edward R. Dartue	Liberian People's Party	839	2.87
Willie Doma Barclay Jr.	Liberia Transformation Party	805	2.76
Weemoh Yatta Jangaba	Alternative National Congress	606	2.07
Kettehkumuehn Earl Murray	Victory for Change Party	414	1.42
Prince Leo Kponbowoe	Movement for Economic Empowerment	364	1.25
Alphonso B. Kamara	Independent	310	1.06
John M. D. Dixon Sr.	Grassroot Democratic Party of Liberia	286	0.98
Peter P. Garnett	Liberia Restoration Party	267	0.91
Gabriel Ephraim Dennis	Coalition for Liberia's Progress	244	0.84
Total		29,212	100.00
Valid votes		29,212	92.07
Invalid/blank votes		2,516	7.93
Total votes		31,728	100.00
