= Nya D. Twayen =

Liberian politician

Nya D. Twayen Jr.

Senator for Nimba County
- Incumbent
- Assumed office 2024
- Preceded by: Jeremiah Kpan Koung

Personal details
- Born: Nimba County, Liberia
- Citizenship: Liberian
- Party: Unity Party
- Occupation: Politician

Nya D. Twayen Jr. is a Liberian politician serving as a Senator for Nimba County in the Senate of Liberia since 2024. He was elected in the 2024 Nimba County senatorial by-election. The by-election was held to fill a vacancy created after Senator Jeremiah Kpan Koung became Vice President of Liberia.

== Early life and education ==
Twayen is from Nimba County in northeastern Liberia. He attended Ganta United Methodist Mission School, where he was active in student leadership and sports.

He graduated from the University of Liberia with a bachelor’s degree in sociology in 2007 as valedictorian for his graduating class. He also received a Master’s degree in Public Policy from the Australia National University in 2012.

== Career ==
=== Government Service ===
Twayen has held several roles in Liberia’s public sector. He served as Director of Youth Service and later Assistant Minister for Youth Service at the Ministry of Youth and Sports by an appointment in 2008. In 2013, he was appointed and served as Deputy Director General of the National Social Security and Welfare Corporation (NASSCORP).

=== Senate of Liberia ===
Twayen was elected in the April 2024 Nimba County senatorial by-election conducted by the National Elections Commission (NEC).

According to official NEC results, he received 67,138 votes, representing 59.27% of valid votes cast, and was declared the winner of the election. The NEC formally certificated him as the winner on 6 May 2024.

He subsequently took office as a member of the 55th Legislature of Liberia. As a senator, he has participated in legislative oversight and policy discussions, including engagement on issues relating to investment promotion and Liberia’s foreign economic policy. His tenure has included outreach activities and engagement with local stakeholders across Nimba County.

== See also ==
- List of senators from Nimba County
