= Saclepea =

Town in Nimba County, Liberia

Saclepea, Liberia
- City
- Location in Liberia
- Coordinates: 7°07′N 8°50′W
- Country: Liberia
- County: Nimba County
- District: Saclepea-Mah

Government
  - City Mayor: Marie Yileyon
  - Town Chief: Chief Zinneh
  - Assistant to City Mayor: Wallace Zigbuo
  - National Representatives: List: Prince Yormie Johnson (Senior Senator); Thomas S.Grupee (Junior Senator); Larry P. Younquoi (Saclepea-Mah District Representative)

Population (2008)
  - Total: 12,117
- Time zone: UTC+0 (GMT)
  - Summer (DST): UTC+0 (GMT)

Saclepea (sometimes spelled Saglelpie on world maps) is a city in Nimba County, Liberia, with more than 12,000 citizens in 2008. Saclepeans are predominantly from the native Mah tribe, and they speak the Mano dialect. During Liberia’s civil war, Saclepea was a primary recruiting and training area for child soldiers, many of whom still reside in the city. Now, Saclepea hosts one of Liberia’s regional offices of the United Nations High Commissioner for Refugees. A camp for refugees from the neighboring country of Ivory Coast is situated on the outskirts of town.

== Location ==
Saclepea is near the geographic center of Nimba County in north-eastern Liberia. It is approximately 50 kilometers from Ganta, Liberia’s second-largest city. Driving distance from Saclepea to the capital city, Monrovia, is approximately 375 kilometers.

== Climate ==
Saclepea experiences two seasons: rainy and dry. Rainy season generally lasts from May through September, and the rest of the year is dry, hot, and dusty, with average daytime temperatures in the nineties Fahrenheit (32-37 °C). Even during the dry season, nights can be very cool, with lows sometimes in the fifties Fahrenheit (10-15 °C).

== Economy ==
Saclepea's economy was destroyed by Liberia's civil war. Trussell and Moore describe the players in and process of Local Economic Development (LED) that helped move Saclepea from post-war relief to rehabilitation and development. They list Saclepea's economic strengths as well as opportunities for further development.

Saclepea's retail economy is driven by its weekly market, the largest outdoor market in Liberia. Every Tuesday, people from all over Nimba County and surrounding counties pour into Saclepea to participate as vendors or customers in Saclepea’s market.

Local industries include:

- Farming – mostly subsistence, but larger palm and rubber tree farming operations are growing with support from NGOs (e.g. World Food Program, Adventist Development and Relief Agency), Saclepea’s Women's Center+, local churches, national government, and Liberia’s Cooperative Development Agency (CDA).
- Transportation – Taxi providers (car and motorcycle) are unionized but without standardization. Taxis are available for local or long-distance travel, but they are often unreliable due to vehicle and roadway maintenance issues.
- Food preparation – mostly roadside stands. A few spartan restaurants and bakeries exist in central district.
- Business centers – many small shops that sell cell phones and phone cards and provide related services such as phone charging, powered by small generators.
- Other small retail – In addition to weekly market retail, Saclepea has many, small free-standing and roadside stand retail shops. Items sold by these shops include phone cards, clothing, cassette tapes/CDs, cigarettes, candy/snack foods, mattresses, floor laminate, etc.
- Construction – commercial and individual furniture. There are approximately 20 carpenters in the city of Saclepea. Stymied by the lack of power tools and the inability to obtain a loan to purchase them, many of them are seeking to form cooperatives in order to add strength to their borrowing power.
- Building materials
- Artists – very little activity; no tourism, so no sales of souvenirs. A few local artists design and print T-shirts, mostly commercial art. A few musicians, although all music recording, production and distribution is done in Monrovia. A couple of small shops for video, photography, and photo processing produce portraits and are hired by journalists, sports teams, law enforcement, etc., for photo documentation. Digital photography is becoming more prevalent.
- Journalism – two radio stations (Radio Saclepea and Radio Ylamba), one nascent news periodical (KOMA NIMBA).
- Tailoring – large and well organized, with eight tailoring shops in Saclepea. Has a city union president. Offers apprenticeships.
- Finance – although no banks currently exist in Saclepea (at this writing, EcoBank is considering opening a branch there) there are several Savings & Credit institutes which offer savings accounts and small loans.
- Mineral Water - Saclepea's first mineral water bottling facility opened in February 2014.

+Saclepea has a very active Women’s Center whose mission is to increase awareness of and decrease instances of gender-based violence. Founded in 2008 by Saclepea native Theresa Monmia, the Saclepea Women’s Center works to encourage women’s economic independence and employs social workers to settle domestic disputes.

== Education ==
Saclepea had fourteen primary/secondary schools in 2010: one government school (Johnny Voker Elementary/High School, grades K-12); one government school for Ivoirian refugee children (K-6); and twelve private, tuition-funded schools (five K-12, one K-11, one K-9, five K-6). Government funds the lowest grades, even at some of the private schools. To graduate 6th, 9th, and 12th grades, all students must pass exams administered by the West African Examinations Council (WAEC). Due to the shortage of certified teachers, many classrooms are taught by “recruited” teachers – uncertified, unpaid men and women who are working on obtaining their certifications.

For Saclepean students, educational opportunities are expanding. In 2010, Saclepea hosted the first in a series of teacher training initiatives, funded by the U.S. non-profit West Africa Crossroads Corporation (WACC), and organized and administered by local Saclepean educators.

Multiple new private elementary schools opened between 2010 and 2014.

In January 2011, WACC helped locals open the Saclepea Community Computer Center (SCCC). SCCC offers computer and internet access to community members, and in 2012, SCCC began building its own building out of which to operate. As of February 2014, the SCCC building was yet uncompleted, and the computer center was preparing to reopen in a rented space after having been closed for several months due to some administrative difficulties.

== Healthcare ==
Saclepea has multiple clinics. It also has only one hospital, Saclepea Mission Hospital. The one government clinic, the Saclepea Comprehensive Health Center, has both in-patient and out-patient facilities and charges no fees. Smaller clinics are run as private, fee-funded practices by local churches or Liberian individuals and are attended by Physician Assistants. There are currently no x-ray machines in Saclepea, so patients with broken bones are sent to the nearest hospital, which is in Ganta, about 50 km away.

In response to war-torn families, low life expectancy, and high rates of death during childbirth, Saclepea has two relatively large orphanages. Both orphanages were founded by and are managed by Saclepean women. Both operate schools, generating some revenue from tuition. They also receive financial support from international sponsors and NGOs (e.g. Christian Aid).

Malaria is still a major health concern. Although treated mosquito nets are widely available, they are very hot to sleep under and are not used consistently. Malaria treatment is available at the larger clinics, but many children and elderly die because they are not taken to the clinic early enough. Tuberculosis and Lassa fever are also common.

== Religion ==
Christianity is the dominant religion practiced among Saclepeans, but the city is also home to a significant Muslim community and to some native spirituality, such as witchcraft and animism. Many religious buildings and congregations, representing a plethora of Christian denominations, are located throughout Saclepea. Numerous churches and para-church organizations offer courses and certificates in theology, pastoral studies, and other Christian topics. Several Bible colleges and seminaries are in the general area. Churches are typically engaged in benevolent activities including education, care of orphans and widows, healthcare, and economic empowerment.

== Notable residents ==
- Musa Bility (born 1967), politician and businessman

== See also ==
- Liberia
- Nimba County
- Ganta
