= Johnson Gwaikolo =

Liberian politician (1955–2024)

Member of the House of Representatives of Liberia
- In office 2018–2024
- Preceded by: Richard M. Tingban
- Succeeded by: Taa Z. Wongbe
- Constituency: Nimba-9

Personal details
- Born: July 25, 1955 Zekepa, Liberia
- Died: February 19, 2024 (aged 68) Monrovia, Liberia
- Party: CDC
- Other political affiliations: UP; VCP
- Education: North Hennepin Community College (AA); Augsburg College (BA, MA)

Johnson Naagon Gwaikolo (July 25, 1955 – February 19, 2024) was a Liberian politician.

== Biography ==
Johnson N. Gwaikolo was born on July 25, 1955, in Zekepa in the Central Province (now Nimba County). He attended the Methodist school in Ganta. He attended the University of Liberia for two years before starting his education in the United States in 1979. He earned an Associate of Arts in accounting from North Hennepin Community College in 1982. He earned a Bachelor of Arts in business administration from Augsburg College in 1984, and then a Master of Arts in leadership in 2005.

Gwaikolo was married to Gifty, and they would have four children.

During the First Liberian Civil War, Gwaikolo served on the interim Legislative Assembly from 1991 to 1992. He briefly served as presiding officer. He continued to serve as the body became the Transitional Legislative Assembly from 1993 to 1994. He served as Chairman of the Committee on Foreign Affairs as well as Chairman of Ways, Means and Finance. From 1995 to 1997, he served as deputy minister for revenues under the Ministry of Finance. From 1997 to 1999, he served as deputy minister for administration for the Ministry of Foreign Affairs, In 1999, he served as executive director of the National Investment Commission. From 2000 to 2003, he served as deputy minister for administration for the Ministry of Labor. He served as deputy minister for administration for the foreign ministry again from 2007 to 2009. He served as deputy minister for administration for the Ministry of Public Works from 2009 to 2011.

In the 2011 election, Gwaikolo unsuccessfully ran for the House of Representatives of Liberia with the Unity Party (UP).

From 2012 to 2014, Gwaikolo served as President of Business and Finance at the United Methodist University. He began serving as interim president of the university in September 2015, replacing Emmanuel Bailey. After a year of being interim president, he was inducted as the fourth president of United Methodist University in September 2016. He served in this capacity until 2017.

In the 2017 election, Gwaikolo was elected to House of Representatives seat representing Nimba County's 9th district with the Victory for Change Party (VCP). He was the only VCP member elected to the legislature, and he served on the party's executive committee. At the time, the VCP was allied with the UP. Initially, Gwaikolo was appointed chairman of the Committee on Education and Public Administration. He also served as co-chair of the Nimba County Legislative Caucus and co-chair of the Committee on Public Works. By December 2023, Gwaikolo was tipped to run for the deputy speaker position, which was made vacant by Deputy Speaker Prince Moye's ascendancy to the Senate. The UP ultimately selected Clarence Massaquoi as their nominee for deputy speaker. The Independent Probe Newspaper reported that the UP passed on Gwaikolo as deputy speaker due to alleged ties with Senator Prince Johnson, former warlord and an ally of the opposing major party, the Coalition for Democratic Change (CDC). Gwaikolo was later appointed chairman of the Committee on Rules, Order and Administration.

By June 2022, Gwaikolo had declared intent to join the CDC. He endorsed CDC nominee, the incumbent George Weah for president in the 2023 election. Gwaikolo ran for re-election with the CDC in 2023. He was defeated by Taa Z. Wongbe. He was among several leading CDC members of the House voted out in the 2023 election, including Speaker Bhofal Chambers.

Gwaikolo died on February 19, 2024, at St. Joseph's Catholic Hospital in Monrovia. He had a state funeral at the capitol building. His remains were taken to Zekepa, where he was buried on March 30.
