= Gunpue Kargon =

Liberian politician

Gunpue L. Kargon is a Liberian politician.

== Biography ==
Gunpue L. Kargon's hometown is Gbor Wehyeeplay in Nimba County. Kargon was a founding member of the Movement for Democracy and Reconstruction (MDR) party. In the 2017 election, Kargon was elected to represent the Nimba County's 4th House district in the House of Representatives of Liberia. Following a legal battle, the election was certified on 16 April 2018.

By late 2022, MDR leader Prince Johnson withdrew his and the MDR's support for President George Weah and the Congress for Democratic Change (CDC). Johnson cited the lack of Nimba County representation in top appointed positions. In May 2023, the MDR's National Executive Committee expelled three senior officials, including Rep. Kargon, for maintaining loyalty to the CDC. They violated the party's constitution, which prohibits loyalties to other parties.

In the 2023 election, Kargon sought re-election under the CDC banner. He was narrowly defeated by MDR candidate Menseah Ernest.
