= Rugie Barry =

Liberian politician

Member of the House of Representatives of Liberia
- Incumbent
- Assumed office 2024
- Preceded by: Lawrence Morris
- Constituency: Montserrado-1

Personal details
- Party: LP

Rugie Yatu Barry is a Liberian politician. She was elected as vice chairperson of the Liberty Party in 2015. She was elected to the House of Representatives in 2023. She took over as chairperson of the Liberty Party in 2024.

== Biography ==
Barry is of the Fula ethnicity.

She was elected as vice chairperson of membership for the Liberty Party (LP) in the 2011 LP convention. She unsuccessfully ran for the House of Representatives with the party in the 2011 general election. She was elected LP vice chairperson of administration in the 2015 LP convention. She again ran unsuccessfully for the House in the 2017 general election. In 2018, she was elected to the LP national executive committee. She was re-elected vice chairperson of administration in 2021.

In the 2023 general election, Barry was elected on the Collaborating Political Parties ticket to the House to represent Montserrado County's 1st district. In September 2024, chairman of the LP, Musa Bility, resigned. As vice chairperson, Barry automatically assumed the role of chairperson of the LP. She became leader during the party's reconciliation process, facilitated by the Joint Reconciliation Committee established by former chairman Bility and Political Leader Nyonblee Karnga-Lawrence.
