= North Hennepin Community College =

Public college in Brooklyn Park, Minnesota, US

Coordinates: 45.10529°N 93.37425°W

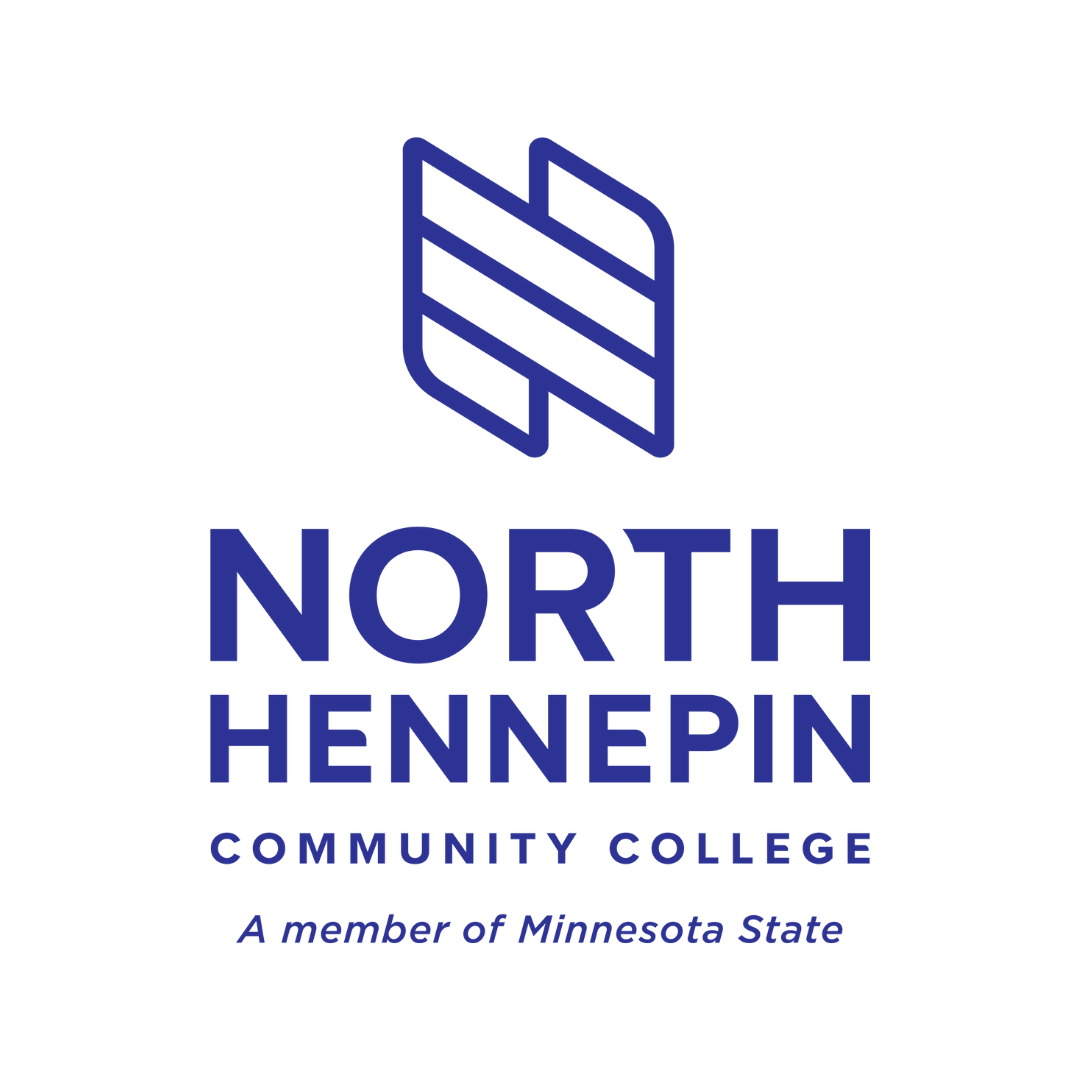
- Motto: Engaging students, changing lives
- Type: Public community college
- Established: 1966; 60 years ago
- Parent institution: Minnesota State Colleges and Universities
- President: Rolando García
- Provost: Derrick Lindstrom
- Students: 9,742 credit students enrolled in fiscal year 2018
- Location: Brooklyn Park, Minnesota, United States
- Colors: Blue and white
- Nickname: Norsemen
- Website: www.nhcc.edu

North Hennepin Community College (NHCC) is a public community college in Brooklyn Park, Minnesota. It was founded in 1966 and is a member of the Minnesota State Colleges and Universities system.

== History ==
The college was founded in 1966 as North Hennepin State Junior College, opening concurrently with two other state junior colleges in the Twin Cities metropolitan area, Anoka-Ramsey Community College and Minnesota Metropolitan State College (now Metropolitan State University). North Hennepin operated during its first three years in the former facilities of Osseo Junior High School in Osseo. Classes were first offered in September 1966, with a first semester enrollment of 425 students. The current site in Brooklyn Park was selected in 1967 and the new campus opened in the fall of 1969. The school's name was changed to North Hennepin Community College in 1973. As of 2024, the school has been part of the North Star Promise Scholarship Program, which provides Minnesota citizens with an Adjusted Gross Income less than $80,000 with a "last dollar" scholarship covering remaining tuition after all other grants and scholarships are applied.

== Academics ==
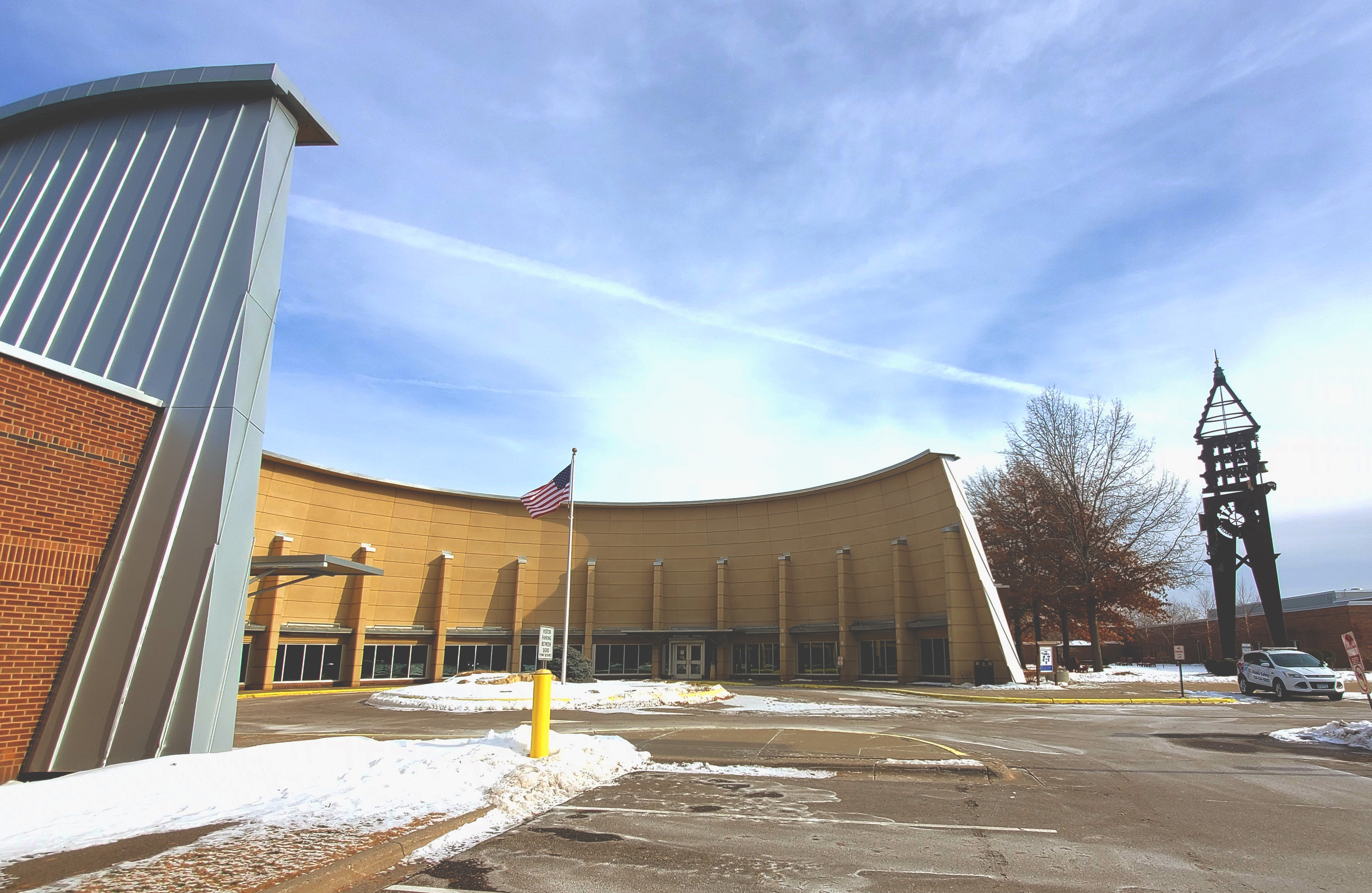
Main entrance

North Hennepin Community College is accredited by the Higher Learning Commission. It offers associate degrees as well as certificates. North Hennepin also offers bachelor's degree programs through collaboration with universities in Minnesota.

== Notable alumni ==
- Bruce Anderson (b. 1950), member of the Minnesota Senate
- Barb Goodwin (b. 1949), former member of the Minnesota Senate
- Johnson Gwaikolo (1955–2024), Liberian politician, member of the House of Representatives of Liberia (2018–2024)
- Tom Hackbarth (b. 1951), former member of the Minnesota House of Representatives
- Joe Hennig (b. 1979), professional wrestler known in WWE as Curtis Axel
- Jerry Hertaus (b. 1952), member of the Minnesota House of Representatives
- Warren Limmer (b. 1955), member of the Minnesota Senate
- Jesse Ventura (b. 1951), 38th governor of Minnesota from 1999 to 2003
