= Mustapha Raji =

Liberian football administrator (born 1974)

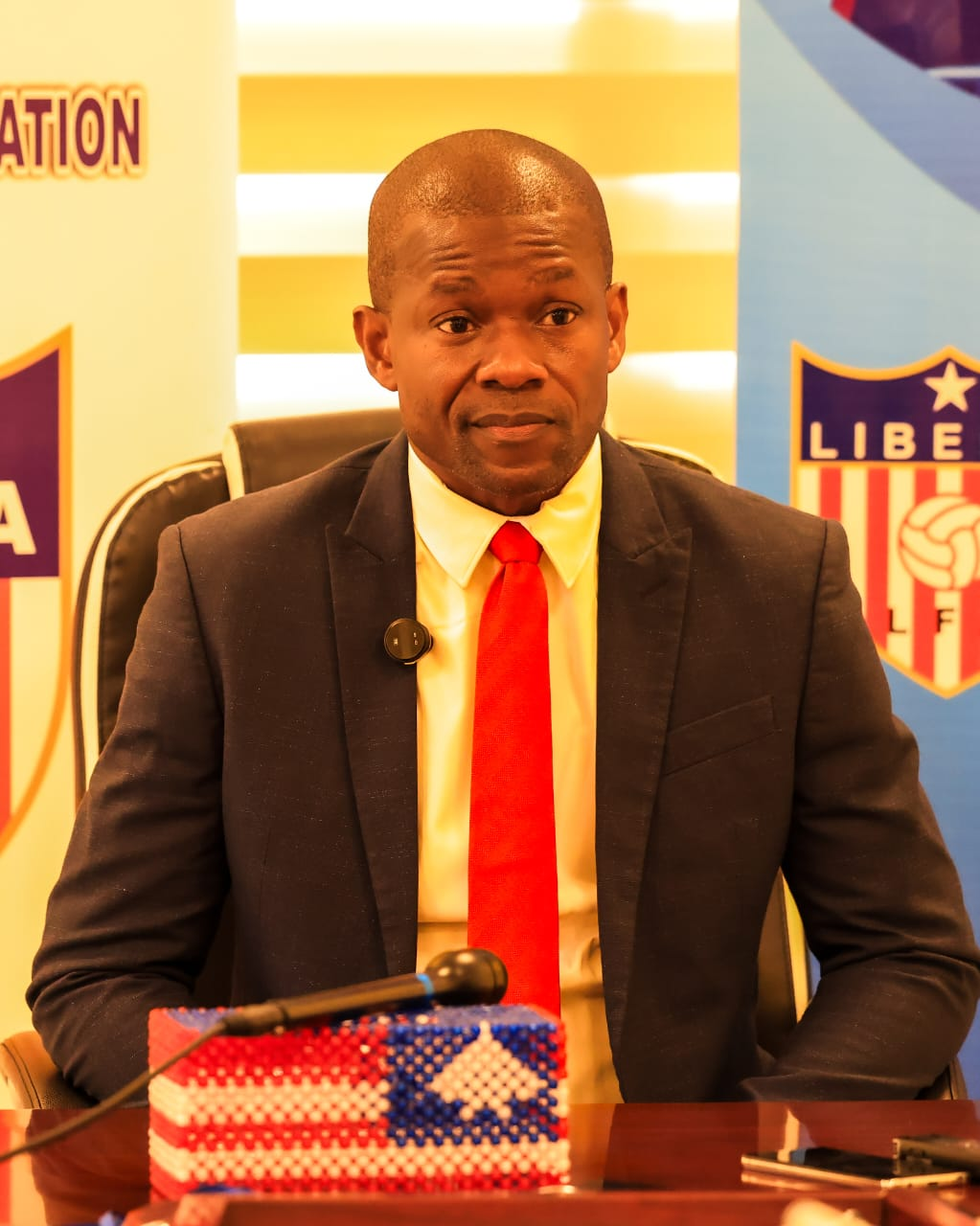
- Raji addressing the press

President of the Liberia Football Association
- Incumbent
- Assumed office 19 April 2018
- Preceded by: Musa Bility

Executive Committee Member, Confederation of African Football
- Incumbent
- Assumed office March 2021
- Preceded by: Mamadou Antonio Souaré

Personal details
- Born: Mustapha Ishola Raji; 22 June 1974 (age 52) Grand Cape Mount County, Liberia
- Occupation: Football administrator, Telecommunication engineer

Mustapha Ishola Raji (born 22 June 1974) is a Liberian football administrator and telecommunications engineer. He has served as the president of the Liberia Football Association (LFA) since 2018 and is a member of the Executive Committee of the Confederation of African Football (CAF).

== Early life ==
Raji was born in Grand Cape Mount County, Liberia, to a Liberian mother and a Nigerian father.

== Career ==
=== Telecommunications ===
Raji has a background in telecommunications and served as Radio Access and Network Manager at Orange Liberia.

=== Club administration ===
In 1995, Raji founded LISCR FC, originally named Young Barcelona. The club progressed through the Liberian football tiers and won multiple domestic titles, including an unbeaten league season in 2017.

=== Liberia Football Association ===
Raji was elected president of the Liberia Football Association in April 2018, succeeding Musa Bility. He was re-elected unopposed for a second term in 2022.

During his presidency, the LFA oversaw the construction of its first permanent headquarters, completed in 2023. His administration also increased support for women's football, including prize money and equipment distribution.

The LFA has also introduced awards such as vehicle prizes for MVPs in the top men's and women's leagues.

=== Confederation of African Football ===
Raji was elected to the Executive Committee of CAF in 2021, representing the West African Football Union Zone A. He was re-elected unopposed in 2025.

== Controversies ==
Raji’s administration has faced criticism regarding transparency and financial management. In 2023, LFA Secretary-General Isaac Montgomery questioned the reported costs of the association's headquarters project. Raji responded by filing a defamation lawsuit.

In 2024, Raji denied receiving personal honorariums from LFA funds. In 2025, he was summoned by the Liberia Anti-Corruption Commission in connection with allegations related to public funds used in the construction of the LFA headquarters.
