= Alex J. Tyler =

Liberian politician (born 1963)

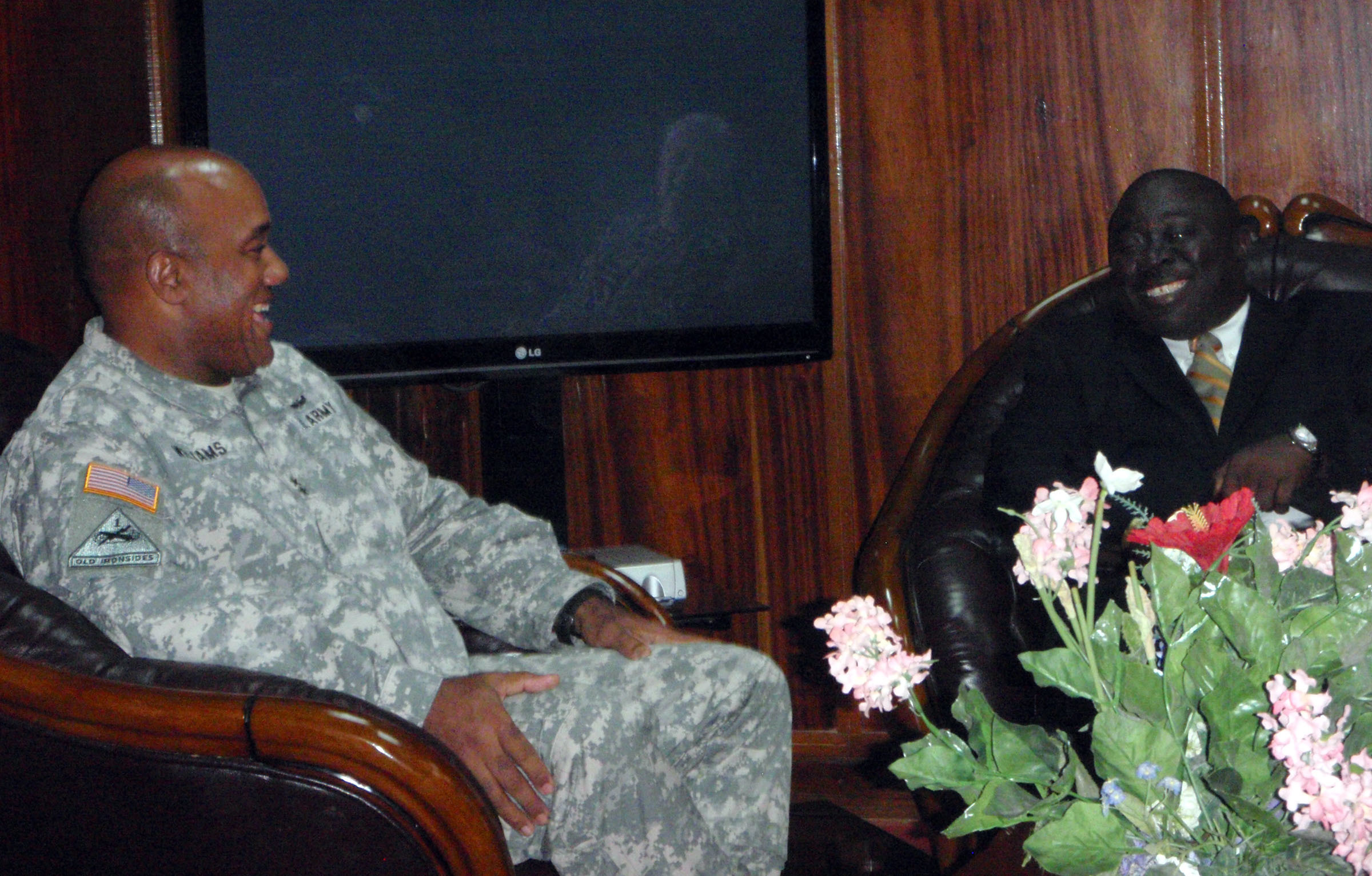
- Tyler on right

Speaker of the House of Representatives of Liberia
- In office 7 April 2007 – 27 September 2016
- President: Ellen Johnson Sirleaf
- Preceded by: Edwin Snowe
- Succeeded by: James Emmanuel Nuquay

Personal details
- Born: December 15, 1963 (age 62) Klay District, Bomi County, Liberia
- Party: Independent
- Other political affiliations: Unity Party
- Education: African Methodist Episcopal University; Louis Arthur Grimes School of Law
- Profession: Business administrator

Alex Jenekai Tyler (born 15 December 1963) is a Liberian politician who was Speaker of the House of Representatives of Liberia from 2007 to 2016. He was first elected as the Representative for the 1st District of Bomi County in 2005. Tyler is a member of the Unity Party, having joined in 2009 following its merger with his Liberian Action Party.

In the 2023 general election, Tyler was elected to the Senate of Liberia as an independent.

== Personal life ==
Tyler was born on 15 December 1963 in Klay District, Bomi County. He graduated from the African Methodist Episcopal University with a BSc in economics and a minor in accounting. He initially worked as an office manager and resale supervisor for BP's West African division before taking jobs at various fishing companies in Liberia. In 2009, Tyler earned a J.D. from the Louis Arthur Grimes School of Law.

== Political career ==
In 2005, Tyler ran for Representative for the 1st District of Bomi County as a member of the Coalition for the Transformation of Liberia, winning with 21.5% of the vote against six opposing candidates. Following the resignation of Speaker Edwin Snowe in 2007, Tyler stood for the speakership, winning with 32 votes to his opponent's 27. He was fiercely challenged in the 2011 UP primaries; while he prevailed in the election, initial news results reported that he had lost.

In the 2017 general elections, Tyler sought the Presidency of Liberia but was unsuccessful.

In the 2023 general elections, he contested as an independent candidate for the Senatorial seat of Bomi County and won.

=== Alleged assault ===
On 18 January 2008, Tyler and his bodyguards were involved in a near-collision with former government official Prince Toe. Tyler's bodyguards allegedly followed Toe to his church, pulled him out of the building, beat him in front of the speaker, and stole two kilograms of gold he had in his possession. On 21 January, the Monrovia Magisterial Court issued an arrest warrant for Tyler on charges of aggravated assault and criminal solicitation. Following the intervention of the Minister of Justice, the arrest warrant was withdrawn for "procedural errors."

=== Photographers in the Legislature ===
During a meeting of the House on 31 May 2011, Tyler ordered the Sergeant-at-Arms to seize two reporters' cameras after alleging that they were disrupting the proceedings. In protest, the Legislative Reporters Pool initiated a media blackout of the House. Following mediation by the Press Union of Liberia, Tyler apologized to the reporters on 13 June.
