= Nimba-4 =

Electoral district in Liberia

- Constituency for the House of Representatives of Liberia
- Electorate: 35,350 (2023)

Current constituency
- Representative: Ernest M. Manseah Sr.

Nimba-4 is an electoral district for the elections to the House of Representatives of Liberia. It is located in a north-eastern portion of Nimba County, bordering the Ivory Coast.

== Elected representatives ==
Year	Representative elected	Party	Notes
2005	Nohn Rebecca Kidau	COTOL	
2011	Garrison Yealue Jr.	NUDP	
2017	Gunpue L. Kargon	MDR	
2023	Ernest M. Manseah Sr.	MDR	
