= Nimba-3 =

Electoral district in Liberia

- Constituency for the House of Representatives of Liberia
- Electorate: 39,525 (2023)

Current constituency
- Representative: Nehker E. Gaye

Nimba-3 is an electoral district for the elections to the House of Representatives of Liberia. It is located in a northern portion of Nimba County, bordering the Republic of Guinea and the Ivory Coast.

== Elected representatives ==
Year	Representative elected	Party	Notes
2005	Worlea-Saywah Dunah	NDM	
2011	Samuel G. Z. Woleh	NUDP	
2017	Joseph Nyan Somwarbi	CDC	
2023	Nehker E. Gaye	MDR	
