= Tokpah John Mulbah =

Liberian politician

Tokpah John Mulbah is a Liberian politician. He is a member of the Congress for Democratic Change. In 2010, he was deputy parliamentary speaker. He was briefly placed under house arrest in July 2010 for allegedly having ordered an assault on a policeman who was trying to impound Mulbah's vehicle. Mulbah denied the allegations and was not charged with any wrongdoing. Mulbah was acquitted of all charges by a unanimous jury verdict on 4 April 2011.
