= Nimba-7 =

Electoral district in Liberia

- Constituency for the House of Representatives of Liberia
- Electorate: 35,775 (2023)

Current constituency
- Representative: Musa Hassan Bility

Nimba-7 is an electoral district for the elections to the House of Representatives of Liberia. It is located in a central portion of Nimba County.

== Elected representatives ==
Year	Representative elected	Party	Notes
2005	Edwin Power Gaye	IND	
2011	Worlea S. Dunah	UP	
2017	Roger S. W. Y. Domah	UP	
2023	Musa Hassan Bility	CPP	
