= Nimba-8 =

Electoral district in Liberia

- Constituency for the House of Representatives of Liberia
- Electorate: 34,283 (2023)

Current constituency
- Representative: Saye S. Mianah

Nimba-8 is an electoral district for the elections to the House of Representatives of Liberia. It is located in a western portion of Nimba County, bordering Bong County.

== Elected representatives ==
| Year | Representative elected | Party | Notes |
|---|---|---|---|
| 2011 | Larry Younquoi | APD | |
| 2017 | Larry Younquoi | UP | |
| 2023 | Saye S. Mianah | MDR | |
