= Nimba-1 =

Electoral district in Liberia

- Constituency for the House of Representatives of Liberia
- Electorate: 36,197 (2023)

Current constituency
- Representative: Samuel N. Brown Sr.

Nimba-1 is an electoral district for the elections to the House of Representatives of Liberia. It is located in a north-western portion of Nimba County, bordering Bong County and the Republic of Guinea.

== Elected representatives ==
Year	Representative elected	Party	Notes
2005	Francis Luogon Karway	UP	
2011	Jeremiah K. Koung	NUDP	
2017	Jeremiah K. Koung	MDR	Resigned after elected to Senate.
2021	Samuel N. Brown Sr.	IND	
2023	Samuel N. Brown Sr.	IND	
