= Jewel Taylor =

Vice President of Liberia from 2018 to 2024

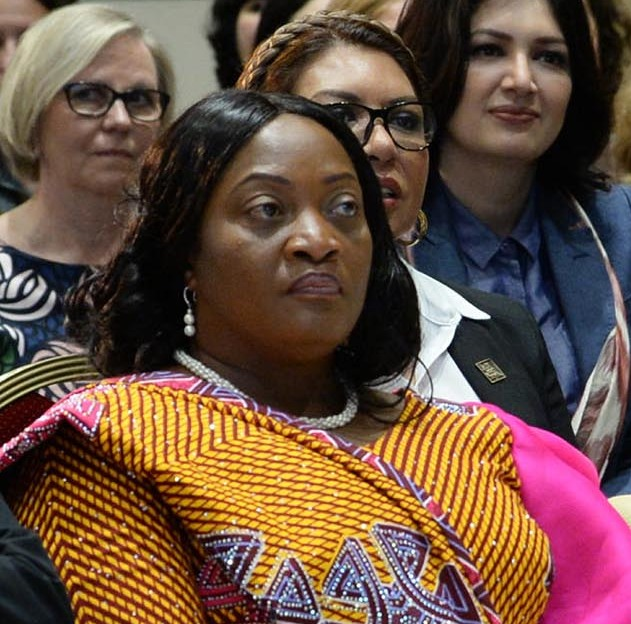
- Taylor in 2018

30th Vice President of Liberia
- In office 22 January 2018 – 22 January 2024
- President: George Weah
- Preceded by: Joseph Boakai
- Succeeded by: Jeremiah Koung

Member of the Senate of Liberia for Bong County
- In office 13 January 2006 – 22 January 2018
- Preceded by: NTLA
- Succeeded by: Henrique Tokpa

First Lady of Liberia
- In role 2 August 1997 – 11 August 2003
- President: Charles Taylor
- Preceded by: Nancy Doe
- Succeeded by: Nettie Blah

Personal details
- Born: Jewel Cianeh Howard; 17 January 1963 (age 63) Zorzor, Lofa, Liberia
- Party: Coalition for Democratic Change
- Other political affiliations: National Patriotic Party
- Spouse: Charles Taylor (m. 1997; div. 2006)
- Children: 2
- Education: University of Liberia; Cuttington University
- Occupation: Politician

Jewel Cianeh Taylor (née Howard; born 17 January 1963) is a Liberian politician who served as the 30th vice president of Liberia from 2018 to 2024. She was married to convicted warlord and former president Charles Taylor from 1997 to 2006 and was first lady of Liberia during his presidency. In 2005, Jewel Taylor was elected to the Senate of Liberia for Bong County as a member of the National Patriotic Party. She was Chair of the Senate Health and Social Welfare Committee on Gender, Women and Children.

== Life and career ==
Jewel Taylor is a member of Liberia’s Kpelle people. While her husband was president, Taylor held several official posts in the Liberian government, including Deputy Governor of the National Bank of Liberia (forerunner to the current Central Bank of Liberia), President of the Agriculture Cooperative and Development Bank (ACDB), and Mortgage Financing Underwriter of the First Union National Bank. In addition, she focused on educational, health, and social projects.

Taylor holds a graduate degree in banking and two bachelors' in banking and economics. She is currently enrolled in the MBA program at Cuttington University in Liberia. On 21 December 2011, she graduated from the Louise Arthur Grimes School of Law of the state-owned University of Liberia. Two days later, a public dispute arose in Bong County regarding honors allegedly given her; she was announced to be the new holder of the title "Madam Suakoko", an honorary Bong County title memorializing the namesake of the Suakoko District, but members of the group that had supposedly awarded her the title soon began denying that the award had been given by their group, saying that the meeting at which she was awarded the title was a meeting to help county residents overcome political differences.

In February 2012, Taylor attempted to introduce legislation into the Liberian parliament that would have made homosexual activity a first-degree felony carrying the death penalty as the maximum punishment. The legislation was not passed after President Ellen Johnson Sirleaf said she would not sign any such bill.

In 2017, Taylor was chosen by George Weah as his running mate on the newly-formed Coalition for Democratic Change ticket. Following a runoff in late 2017, she became the first female Vice President of Liberia when her party won the elections.

In 2020, she was infected with COVID-19 and was flown to Ghana for treatment. Taylor's son, Philip Taylor, died on 20 January 2026.

In August 2026, Taylor was arrested by the Liberian National Police and charged in connection to a cocaine shipment seized by law enforcement estimated to be worth $370,000,000 USD bound for Europe. She has been indicted for drug trafficking and money laundering.

Honorary titles
Preceded by Nancy Doe	First Lady of Liberia; 1997–2003	Succeeded by Nettie Blah
Political offices
Preceded by Joseph Boakai	Vice President of Liberia; 2018–2024	Succeeded by Jeremiah Koung
