= Seuhn Mecca District =

Coordinates: 6°37′02″N 10°42′24″W

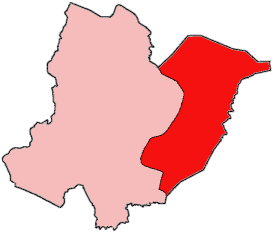
Location of Seuhn Mecca District in Bomi County

Seuhn Mecca District is one of four administrative districts of Bomi County, Liberia.
