= Nimba-9 =

Electoral district in Liberia

- Constituency for the House of Representatives of Liberia
- Electorate: 27,645 (2023)

Current constituency
- Representative: Taa Z. Wongbe

Nimba-9 is an electoral district for the elections to the House of Representatives of Liberia. It is located in a southern portion of Nimba County, bordering Bong, Grand Bassa, Rivercess, and Grand Gedeh counties.

== Elected representatives ==
Year	Representative elected	Party	Notes
2011	Richard M. Tingban	IND	
2017	Johnson N. Gwaikolo	VCP	
2023	Taa Z. Wongbe	IND	
