= Lahai Gbabye Lansanah =

Liberian politician

Adjutant Lahai Gbabye Lansanah (October 20, 1968 – August 5, 2020) was a Liberian politician and former military officer.

== Biography ==
Lansanah was born on October 20, 1968.

Lansanah was a member of the National Democratic Party of Liberia. Lansanah was elected to the Senate of Liberia in the 2005 general election as Senior Senator from the Bomi County. He was one of two senators from the NDPL and was the Chairman of the Senate Committee on National Defense. 2008–2009 Lansanah served as Acting President Pro Tempore of the Senate of Liberia. By 2009, Senator John Ballout of Maryland became Chairman of the Defense Committee.

In the 2014 Senate election, Lansanah ran for re-election with the National Patriotic Party. He was defeated by Morris Gato Saytumah.

Lansanah died on August 5, 2020.

== Military career ==
Prior to joining the Senate, Lansanah served as adjutant to former commanding general of the Armed Forces of Liberia, Brigadier John Tarnue.
