= Senjeh District =

Coordinates: 6°32′48″N 10°56′51″W

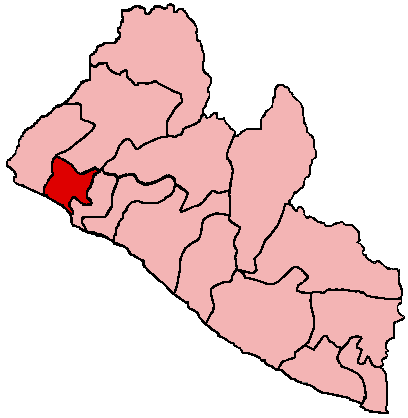
Location of Bomi County in Liberia

Senjeh District is one of four administrative districts of Bomi County, Liberia. As of 2008 the population was 29,325.
