= Jeremiah Koung =

Vice President of Liberia since 2024

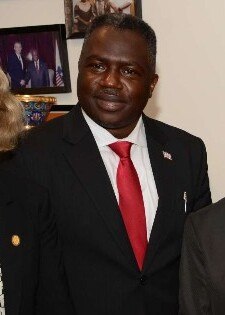
- Koung in 2024

31st Vice President of Liberia
- Incumbent
- Assumed office 22 January 2024
- President: Joseph Boakai
- Preceded by: Jewel Taylor

Member of the Senate of Liberia from Nimba County
- In office 14 January 2021 – 22 January 2024 Serving with Prince Johnson
- Preceded by: Thomas S. Grupee
- Succeeded by: Nya D. Twayen Jr.

Member of the House of Representatives of Liberia
- In office 2012–2021
- Preceded by: Francis Luogon Karway
- Succeeded by: Samuel N. Brown Sr.
- Constituency: Nimba-1

Personal details
- Born: Jeremiah Kpan Koung; 17 March 1978 (age 48) Yekepa, Nimba, Liberia
- Party: Unity Party
- Other political affiliations: National Union for Democratic Progress; Movement for Democracy and Reconstruction
- Spouse: Synleseh Stephanie Dahn-Koung
- Education: Cuttington University (BA)
- Occupation: Politician

Jeremiah Kpan Koung Sr. (born 17 March 1978) is a Liberian politician who is the 31st and current vice president of Liberia. He served in the House of Representatives of Liberia from 2012 to 2020, and was elected to the Senate of Liberia in 2020. He became the standard bearer of the Movement for Democracy and Reconstruction in 2022. In 2023, after Koung had become a member of the Unity Party, Joseph Boakai selected Koung as his running mate during his presidential run.

== Biography ==
Koung was born on 17 March 1978 in Yekepa, Nimba County. There he began his primary school education in 1981. He moved to Ganta with his father in 1983. In 1986, moved to stay with his aunt in Buchanan. His education was interrupted by the First Liberian Civil War in 1990. By 1996, Koung returned to Ganta after spending years in a refugee camp in Guinea. That year he enrolled in high school, graduating by 2001. He started attending Cuttington University in 2006, and graduated with a BA in business administration by 2010. Koung is married to Synleseh Stephanie Dahn-Koung.

Koung was elected to the House of Representatives of Liberia in 2011, under the National Union for Democratic Progress banner. Koung's campaign was endorsed by ex-warlord Senator Prince Johnson. He represented the Nimba County #1 District. In 2011, Koung began construction of the Ester and Jereline Medical Center. It was completed in July 2016. In an investigation the Center for Transparency and Accountability in Liberia found that Koung, between 2012 and 2021, received nearly US$1 million to run this private hospital. He claimed he had turned the hospital over to the government, however, no documents disclosing such a transfer have been produced.

In the 2017 election, Koung was re-elected to his Nimba County House seat under the Movement for Democracy and Reconstruction (MDR) banner. In the 2020 election, Koung's senatorial run was again endorsed by Senator Johnson. Koung won election to the Senate, again running with the MDR. Koung became the second leader of the MDR party after an election on 22 December 2022, succeeding founder of the party, Senator Johnson. As standard bearer, Koung continued Johnson's policy of opposing the ruling Coalition for Democratic Change.

On 28 April 2023, former vice president and standard bearer of the Unity Party (UP), Joseph Boakai announced Koung as his running mate for Boakai's 2023 presidential run. Koung became a full member of the UP before to his selection as running mate. After the initial October election, neither Boakai and Koung nor incumbents George Weah and Jewel Taylor received a majority of the vote, triggering a run-off election in November. On 10 November, during a campaign event in Zor-Zoalay Town, Nimba County, there was an attack involving gunfire. Several were hospitalized, and Senators Koung and Johnson narrowly escaped.

On 17 November 2023, after the run-off election, President Weah conceded the election, resulting in Boakai becoming president-elect and Koung becoming vice president-elect.
