= Klay District =

Coordinates: 6°41′39″N 10°52′28″W

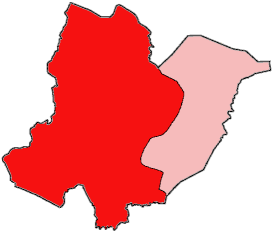
Location of Klay District in Bomi County

Klay District is one of four administrative districts of Bomi County, Liberia. As of 2008 the population was 22,355.
