= Dewoin District =

Coordinates: 6.605°N 10.956°W

- District
- Interactive map of Dewoin District
- Country: Liberia
- County: Bomi County

Government
  - Superintedent: Horace Gbowee

Population (2008)
  - Total: 12,782
- Time zone: UTC+0 (GMT)

Dewoin District is one of four administrative districts of Bomi County, Liberia. As of 2008 the population was 12,782.
