= Movement for Democracy and Reconstruction =

Political party in Liberia

- Abbreviation: MDR
- Chairman: Cooper Kruah
- Founder: Prince Johnson
- Founded: c. November 2015
- Legalised: May 2016
- Split from: National Union for Democratic Progress
- Headquarters: Monrovia, Liberia
- Ideology: Social conservatism Christian democracy
- Colours: Blue; White; Red
- Senate: 1 / 30
- House of Representatives: 5 / 73

Website
- Facebook page

The Movement for Democracy and Reconstruction (MDR) is a political party in Liberia.

== Background ==
In 2010, former warlord, Nimba County Senator Prince Johnson founded the National Union for Democratic Progress (NUDP). He contested the 2011 presidential election with the party. Ahead of the 2014 Senate election, Johnson was expelled from the NUDP. Johnson won re-election to the Senate as an independent. By November 2015, Johnson had begun the task of founding a new political party, the MDR.

== History ==
The MDR was certified by the National Elections Commission in May 2016. Senator Prince Johnson was initially the leader of the MDR. Johnson contested the presidency with the party, alongside running mate Audrian R. Smith-Forbes, in the 2017 election. The MDR ticket won 8.2% of the vote. It came in fourth place, behind the Liberty Party. Johnson supported Congress for Democratic Change (CDC) candidate George Weah in the subsequent run-off election. Weah was ultimately elected president. Johnson's backing was reported to be influential in 2017 as well as in previous presidential elections since 2005. Sources such as the New York Times and the Liberian Observer described him as a "kingmaker".

In the 2017 House of Representatives election, the MDR ran 38 candidates. Two were elected: Jeremiah Koung in the Nimba's 1st House district and Gunpue L. Kargon in the Nimba's 4th House district. In the 2020 election, Rep. Koung was elected to the Senate under the MDR banner.

By late 2022, Johnson withdrew his and the MDR's support for President Weah and the CDC. Johnson cited the lack of Nimba County representation in top appointed positions. Cooper Kruah was the only Weah cabinet minister from Nimba County. In December 2022, Johnson resigned as head of the MDR. In an MDR convention on 22 December, Senator Koung was elected standard bearer. As standard bearer, Koung continued Johnson's policy of opposing the CDC. In May 2023, the MDR's National Executive Committee expelled three senior officials including Rep. Kargon and National MDR Vice Chairman for Governmental Affairs Wilfred Bangura for maintaining loyalty to the CDC. They violated the party's constitution, which prohibits loyalties to other parties.

After disclosing his breaking away from the CDC, Johnson announced he was seeking collaboration with other opposition parties. On 28 April 2023, former vice president and standard bearer of the Unity Party (UP), Joseph Boakai announced MDR Standard Bearer Koung as his running mate for his 2023 presidential run. After the initial October election, neither Boakai nor incumbent President Weah received a majority of the vote, triggering a run-off election in November. On 17 November 2023, after the run-off election, President Weah conceded the election, resulting in Boakai becoming president-elect and Koung becoming vice president-elect.

In the 2023 legislative elections, MDR candidates won elections in four House districts in Nimba County: 3rd, 4th, 6th, and 8th. Johnson was re-elected in the Senate.

After President Boakai's inauguration, there were fractures between him and Johnson in the following months. By March 2024, Johnson had been disappointed with Boakai's appointments, again claiming too little representation from Nimba County and the MDR. Vice President Koung has also reportedly exerted less influence over Boakai than Johnson expected. Boakai's calling for a war crime court, an idea opposed by Johnson, was another friction point between the two. In response, Johnson began strategizing against Boakai and the UP in the 2024 by-elections. In the 2024 Nimba County Senate election, Johnson backed Samuel Kogar, but the UP candidate, backed by Vice President Koung, Nya D. Twayen Jr. was successful.

By November 2024, Koung had made clear he had become a full member of the UP before his selection as their running mate, distancing himself from the MDR. Johnson died in November 2024. Kogar was elected in 2025 on the MDR ticket to replace Johnson in Senate. MDR candidate Kortor Kwagrue was elected to the House to replace Kogar.

== Election results ==
=== Presidential elections ===
Election	Candidate	Votes	%	Votes	%	Result
Election	Candidate	First round		Second round		Result
2017	Prince Johnson	127,666	8.22	-	-	Lost ✗

=== Senate elections ===
Election	Votes	%	Seats	+/–	Position
2020	37,899	4.30	1 / 30	New	▲4th
2023	128,437	7.09	1 / 30	-	▲3rd

=== House of Representatives elections ===
Election	Votes	%	Seats	+/–	Position
2017	56,734	3.69	2 / 73	New	▲8th
2023	50,408	2.77	4 / 73	▲2	▲5th
