= Edwin Snowe =

Liberian politician

Edwin Melvin Snowe, Jr.

Member of the Liberian Senate from Bomi County
- Incumbent
- Assumed office 22 February 2021
- Preceded by: Sando D. Johnson

Speaker of the House of Representatives of Liberia
- In office 13 January 2006 – 18 January 2007
- Preceded by: George Koukou
- In office 29 January 2007 – 15 February 2007
- Succeeded by: Alex J. Tyler

Personal details
- Born: 11 February 1970 (age 56)
- Education: University of Liberia (MPA)
- Alma mater: St. Augustine Episcopal mission high school
- Occupation: Politician
- Website: https://edwinsnowe.org

Edwin Melvin Snowe, Jr. (born 11 February 1970) is a Liberian politician, serving as a Senator of the Liberian Senate for Bomi.

He has served in the House of Representatives of Liberia since January 2006, and was Speaker of the House of Representatives between January 2006 and February 2007.

== Political career ==
Snowe attended the St. Augustine Episcopal high school at Kakata in Margibi County, and he is a graduate of public administration (magna cum laude) from the University of Liberia. He became the son-in-law of Charles Taylor, who was President of Liberia from 1997 to 2003, and was a prominent figure under his government, most notably as head of the oil refinery company. He also served as the President of the Liberia Football Association.

In the 11 October 2005 legislative election, Snowe ran as an independent candidate in the 5th district of Montserrado County and was elected to the House of Representatives. Subsequently, he was elected as Speaker of the House of Representatives.

In 2011, he was elected representative for district #6 Montserrado County where he serves in the 53rd National Legislature of Liberia. Within the 53rd National Legislature, he became an active member of that Parliament and subsequently make a turn in his political career in 2016 when he received a huge petition from the citizen of Senjeh District, Bomi County to contest the representative seat of that district.

The battle to contest in Senjeh district became the a clash of titans within the country because Snowe was taking to the Supreme Court of Liberia by some politicians within Bomi on grounds that Snowe wasn't domicile within the district but in the end, the court ruled in Snowe favor and 2017 he became elected as Representative for Senjeh District.

Three years after his election as representative for Senjeh district and base on his workings and his quest to improve the social, political, and economic sectors of Bomi, he received a huge petition from the citizen to contest the senatorial seat of the county. During the Senatorial Election of 2020, he again won with 16,476 amounting to 53.97%.

=== 2007 controversy ===
Snowe was removed from his position as Speaker in January 2007 following a bribery case against him. However, a few days later the Supreme Court ordered him to be reinstated, pending Snowe's appeal. According to Snsittinge regular setting of the house was unconstitutional and was illegal; he alleges that some votes against him were obtained through bribery and that the matter was not legitimate because it did not occur in a city, as required by the constitution. On 29 January, the Supreme Court ruled in Snowe's favor, describing his removal as unconstitutional. However, the legislators who attempted to vote Snowe out of his position reportedly intended to again attempt to remove him by holding another vote.

The "reinstated Speaker" resigned on Thursday, 15 February 2007 on grounds that he would not go to the township of Virginia for Legislative matters in keeping with article 40 of the Liberian Constitution which states: Neither House shall adjourn for more than five days without the consent of the other and both Houses shall always sit in the same city.

On 2 March, Snowe appeared for police questioning in connection with his alleged misappropriation of more than a million dollars when he was managing director of the Liberia Petroleum Refining Corporation under the transitional government of Gyude Bryant. The investigation was postponed until the following week due to Snowe being ill. Snowe appeared for questioning again on 6 March. It has been argued that Snowe is immune from prosecution because he is a legislator, but according to justice minister Frances Johnson Morris, immunity can be removed for certain crimes, including corruption. Snowe appeared in court to face the charge against him on 12 April. His lawyers filed a bond of $1.8 million U.S. dollars, but the prosecution argued this was inadequate and needed to be doubled, and also argued that the source of the bond, the African Insurance Company of Liberia, could not legally issue it to Snowe. On 16 August 2007, the Monrovia City Court ruled in Snowe's favor, declaring the bond to be "sufficient and valid".

=== ECOWAS ===
In March 2020, Snowe was appointed to chair the ECOWAS Parliamentary Committee on Political Affairs, Peace, Security and African Peer Review Mechanism by the speaker of ECOWAS Parliament Sidie Mohammed Tunis of Sierra Leone.
