= Victory for Change Party =

Political party in Liberia

The Victory for Change Party (VCP) is a political party in Liberia. (Note: Also abbreviated as VFC.) It is a part of the Rainbow Alliance.

== History ==
Marcus Roland Jones was the founder of the VCP. He was a lawyer who attempted to run as an independent in the 2005 presidential election, though the National Elections Commission (NEC) blocked his candidacy in August, citing problems with his registration. By 2011, Jones was serving as the standard bearer for the VCP, and contested the presidency with Monica Dokie Borbor as his running mate. Jones received 5,305 votes, 0.4% of the total. In the 2011 legislative elections, the VCP had three candidates contest the Senate and fifteen contest the House of Representatives. None were elected.

The VCP had two candidates contesting the 2014 Senate elections. Neither were successful.

In October 2015, Foreign Minister Augustine Kpehe Ngafuan resigned from his post. He planned to contest the 2017 presidential election and was required to resign his post to comply with the National Code of Conduct. In April 2016, Ngafuan resigned from the Unity Party (UP). On October 22, 2016, Ngafuan, along with his supporters, joined the VCP. By November, there had been rumors circulating that Jones had sold the VCP's ticket to Ngafuan. Both Jones and Ngafuan denied the allegation. Jones further stated that Ngafuan was not qualified under the VCP's constitution to run for any position with the party, as he had joined the party too recently. VCP Chairman Emmanuel Tulay later stated there was no such qualification for candidates in the VCP's constitution. In May 2017, Ngafuan had stated that he was no longer seeking the presidency, not wanting to run against the UP candidate, Vice President Joseph Boakai. He gave his endorsement to Boakai. The VCP did not contest the presidency in 2017. By August 2017, Ngafuan had re-joined the UP.

In the 2017 House elections, the VCP ran 22 candidates. Johnson N. Gwaikolo won in Nimba County's 9th House district. He was the only VCP candidate elected.

In May 2020, the VCP, along with 10 other political parties, signed a document to become part of the Rainbow Alliance (RA), with the goal of opposing the ruling Coalition for Democratic Change (CDC) in the 2023 election. The RA was certified by the NEC on August 31, 2020, with the VCP as one of its 7 founding parties. The RA unsuccessfully contested the 2020 Senate elections with 10 candidates.

By June 2022, Rep. Gwaikolo had declared his intention to join the Congress for Democratic Change. Jones died in March 2023. The RA did not contest the 2023 presidential election and did not win any seats in the legislative elections. Gwaikolo contested re-election with the CDC in 2023 and was defeated.
