= Joseph Boakai =

President of Liberia since 2024

- Boakai in 2025

26th President of Liberia
- Incumbent
- Assumed office 22 January 2024
- Vice President: Jeremiah Koung
- Preceded by: George Weah

29th Vice President of Liberia
- In office 16 January 2006 – 22 January 2018
- President: Ellen Johnson Sirleaf
- Preceded by: Wesley Momo Johnson
- Succeeded by: Jewel Taylor

Minister of Agriculture
- In office 1983–1985
- President: Samuel Doe

Personal details
- Born: Joseph Nyuma Boakai; 30 November 1944 (age 81) Worsonga, Lofa County, Liberia
- Party: Unity Party
- Spouse: Katumu Yatta (m. 1972)
- Children: 4
- Education: University of Liberia
- Occupation: Politician

Joseph Nyuma Boakai Sr. (born 30 November 1944) is a Liberian politician who has served as the 26th president of Liberia since 2024. He previously served as the 29th vice president of Liberia from 2006 to 2018, under President Ellen Johnson Sirleaf and as the minister of agriculture from 1983 to 1985. Boakai ran for president in 2017, losing the election to George Weah. He went on to defeat Weah in the 2023 election.

== Personal life ==
Joseph Boakai was born in the remote village of Worsonga in Foya District, Lofa County, on 30 November 1944, and is from the Kissi ethnic group. He is married to Katumu Boakai and they have four children. Boakai is a Baptist and a deacon of the Effort Baptist Church.

Active in philanthropic efforts, Boakai supervised and personally financed a 7-mile (11.2-kilometer) rural village road construction near Warsonga in Lofa county, Liberia. He also worked with the Federation of Liberian Youth (FLY) and the Danish Youth to construct a school for 150 students and clinic for a community of 10 villages. He was active in organizing and fundraising for the rural electrification of Foya Kama in Lofa County, Northern Liberia.

Before serving as vice president, Boakai consulted with several institutions, including serving as Chief Technical Advisor on Agriculture Policy, Ministry of Agriculture. He reviewed and evaluated the Liberian 1986 proposed Green Revolution and FAO World Bank 1986 Agricultural sector Review Document and evaluated AMSCO, Amsterdam Funded training program for projects in Uganda in 1994 and Tanzania in 1996.

He is the owner of LUSU Resource Corporation and co-owner of AGROMACHINES Liberia.

Boakai has served on many boards, including as chairman of Liberia Finance and Trust Corporation, chairman of the board of Star Radio, founding member of LOIC, member of the board of the Liberia Baptist Theological Seminary, founding member of Bethesda Christian Mission, founding organizer-African Methodist Episcopal University, ambassador of the Liberia YMCA, president of LUSU Resource Corporation, and ex-president of the Monrovia Rotary Club.

As vice president, he was the president of the Liberian Senate and presided over plenary sessions of that body for two days each week. He also performed supervisory functions over several institutions and agencies, including the Liberia National Lotteries (LOTTO), the Liberia Marketing Association (LMA), the Liberia Agency for Community Empowerment (LACE), and the National Commission on Disarmament Demobilization Resettlement and Reintegration (NCDDRR).

== Education ==
Boakai attended primary and high school in Sierra Leone and Liberia before graduating from the College of West Africa in Monrovia, Liberia. He later graduated from the University of Liberia in 1972 with a bachelor's degree in business administration.

== Political career ==
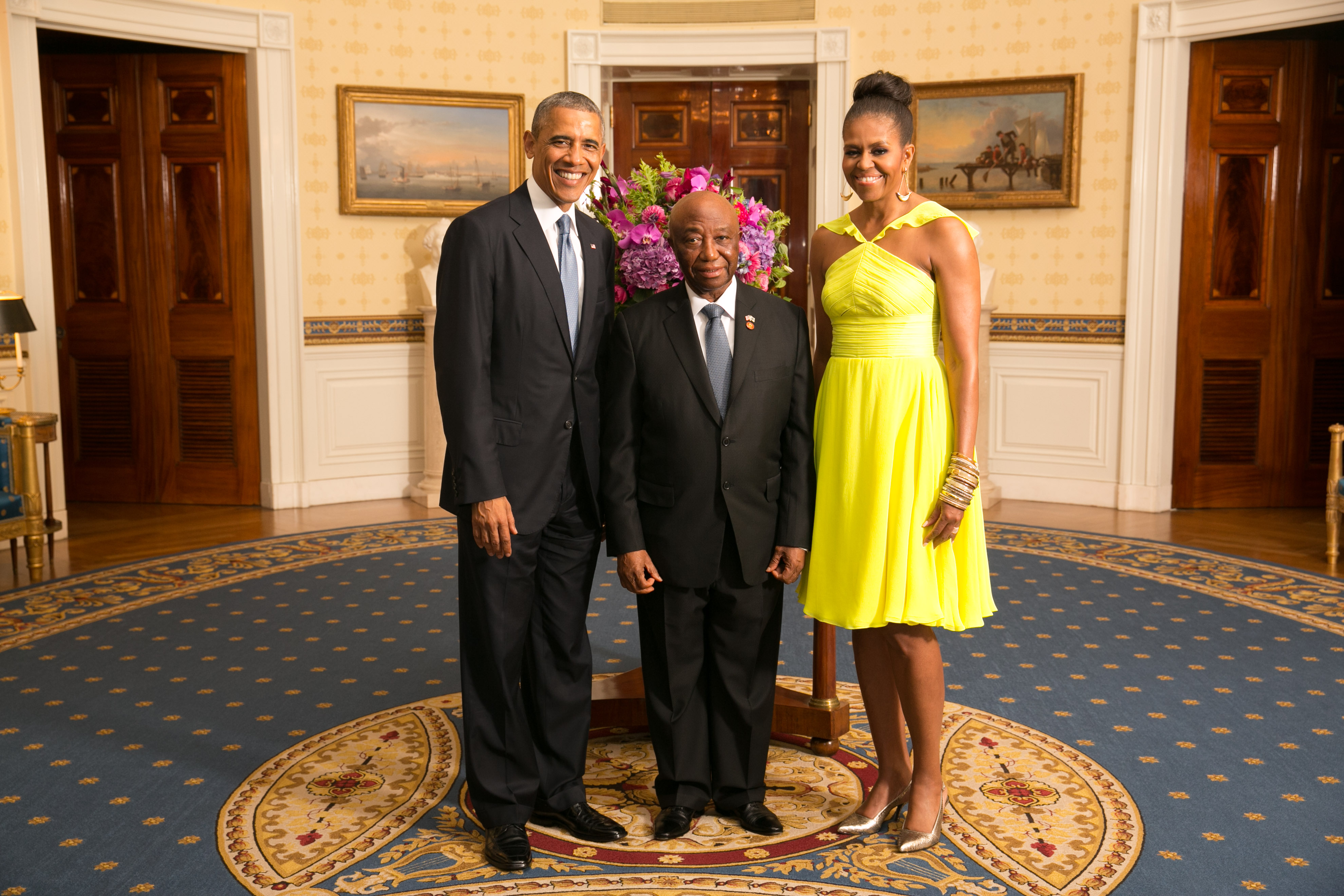
US president Barack Obama and first lady Michelle Obama greet Boakai in 2014

Boakai went on to work in both the public and private sectors. He worked as a resident manager (1973–1980) and managing director (1980–1982) for the Liberia Produce Marketing Corporation (LPMC). From 1983 to 1985, he served as Minister of Agriculture under President Samuel Doe. While Minister of Agriculture, Boakai chaired the 15 nation West African Rice Development Association. In 1992, he was the managing director of the Liberia Petroleum Refinery Company (LPRC). He later worked as a consultant to the World Bank in Washington and founded a firm dealing in agricultural equipment and consultancy. He has served as board chairman of the Liberia Wood Management Corporation and the Liberia Petroleum Refining Company. He announced his intention to run for the Liberian presidency, which was scheduled for 10 October 2017.

During the first round of the 2017 elections where none of the candidates who contested was able to obtain 50% +1 votes to become the country's next president, president Ellen Johnson Sirleaf stated on several occasions that she was supporting her vice president.

After the first round, she said she was not supporting the two candidates who made it to the run-off. But she was seen on 21 December 2017 with George Weah at a groundbreaking ceremony for a road leading to his rival's home, Vice President Joseph N. Boakai. This was harshly received by some members of the ruling Unity Party, who considered the president's action as campaigning for Weah. After the photos flooded social media, President Sirleaf clarified on the same day: "I have told the AU that I am neither supporting Senator Weah nor Vice President Boakai, although it's my right to support either of them in the run-off. I never knew the protocol of the program until I reached to the program. When I got there, I saw Senator Jewel Howard Taylor and Senator Weah; I couldn't tell the both senators to leave because they are both sitting senators. It was Senator Jewel Howard Taylor that gave the shovel to Senator Weah, at which time my head was bent down. So, it was difficult for me to identify the person holding the shovel. But however, I regret that the Vice President wasn't there; this is his road, and he was needed to be here."

When Boakai was asked if he was invited or not, he said that the President never invited him to carry out the groundbreaking ceremony for the road that leads to his home in Lofa County.

When the vice president appeared on the Costa Show, he said one of the reasons the president did not want to support him was his alignment with Chair Wilmot Paye and Senator Varney G. Sherman.

Boakai was defeated by former football legend George M. Weah in the run-off of the 2017 presidential and representatives elections, but paid an appreciation visit to his county, Lofa.

During his visit, he spoke of his appreciation for his people and urged them to work with the new government. Boakai said, "The purpose of my visit here is to appreciate my people for showing the high level of love and dedication ... ensuring that we were successful in the process because they did what they committed themselves to do by voting in their numbers." The election has ended, he said, and there is a new government that will continue the work from where the Unity Party-led government will stop. "I ask that we all rally around this new administration to bring the desired developments that we all want. We should all know that Liberia has won, so let us support each other."

== Reforms & anti-corruption efforts ==
During his presidency, Boakai announced measures aimed at strengthening transparency and accountability in government institutions. His administration also launched audits of public institutions and suspended hundreds of officials for failing to declare their assets as part of an anti-corruption campaign.

== Presidency ==
Boakai defeated incumbent George Weah in the second round of the 2023 presidential election, which was held on 14 November. Taking up office at 79, he was the oldest president of the country. At his inauguration as president on 22 January 2024, Boakai was seen having difficulty in delivering his inaugural address, which he was unable to finish, and was escorted away from the podium, with reports suggesting that he was suffering from heat exhaustion.

After assuming office in January 2024, President Joseph Boakai made the fight against corruption a top priority, calling it a major barrier to national progress and public confidence. His administration introduced bold actions, such as initiating audits of major institutions like the Central Bank of Liberia and suspending over 450 officials—including senior ministers—for failing to comply with asset declaration rules set by the Liberia Anti-Corruption Commission (LACC). Demonstrating personal commitment, Boakai also cut his own salary by 40%, from $13,400 to $8,000 annually to encourage fiscal discipline. Within his first year, Liberia's score on the Corruption Perceptions Index improved by two points, and a 2024 AfroBarometer survey showed that 28% of Liberians felt the government was effectively addressing corruption—up from just 6% in 2022.

On 29 May 2025, a private jet carrying Boakai from Nigeria made a rough landing at Roberts International Airport in Monrovia after its tires burst upon landing, prompting the cancellation of all overnight flights. No injuries were reported.

On 5 July 2025, Boakai issued an official apology to victims of the First and Second Liberian Civil Wars.

=== Foreign policy ===
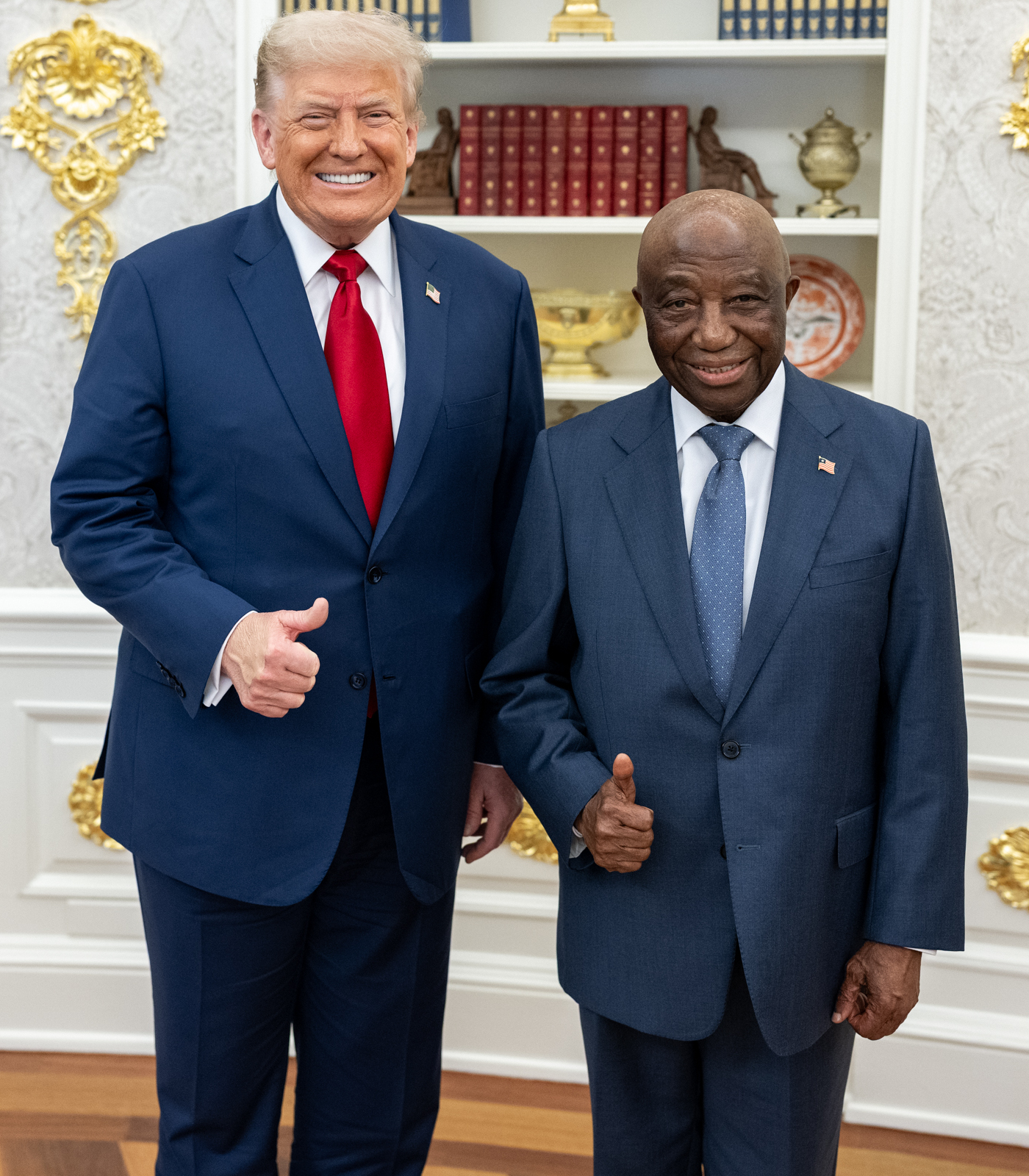
President Trump greets President Boakai of Liberia in the Oval Office, Wednesday, July 9, 2025, before a multilateral luncheon with African leaders.

Boakai's foreign policy emphasizes economic diplomacy, aiming to shift Liberia's international relations from aid dependency to partnerships focused on trade, investment, and sustainable development. Since taking office on January 22, 2024, Boakai has prioritized strengthening ties with long-standing allies like the United States, highlighted by his July 9, 2025, meeting with U.S. President Donald Trump in Washington, D.C., where he advocated for U.S. investment in Liberia and a joint approach to regional peace and security. Boakai has also committed to maintaining Liberia's obligations within multilateral organizations like the United Nations, ECOWAS, the Mano River Union, and the African Union, fostering regional stability and cooperation. Additionally, his administration engages Liberians in the diaspora, proposing initiatives like an annual Diaspora Conference to harness their contributions for national development.

In June 2025, Liberia achieved a significant milestone in its international reemergence by being elected as a non-permanent member of the United Nations Security Council (UNSC) for the 2026–2027 term, securing 181 votes in a single round of balloting at the UN General Assembly. Boakai hailed this as “a new chapter in Liberia’s global engagement,” emphasizing the nation's historical legacy as Africa's first independent republic and a founding UN member, alongside its commitment to peacebuilding and sustainable development. This marks Liberia's second time on the UNSC, having previously served in 1961, and reflects international confidence in its ability to contribute to global peace and security. Boakai's administration, led by Foreign Minister Sara Beysolow Nyanti, campaigned on priorities like Women, Peace and Security, climate-conflict linkages, and youth empowerment, aligning with Liberia's ARREST Agenda for Inclusive Development. This election positions Liberia to amplify Africa's voice on the council, joining the Democratic Republic of the Congo and Somalia in the African Group.

== Honours ==
- Ivory Coast:
  - Grand Cross of the National Order of the Ivory Coast (7 March 2024)

== See also ==
- List of current heads of state and government
- List of heads of the executive by approval rating
