= Bomi County =

County of Liberia

- County
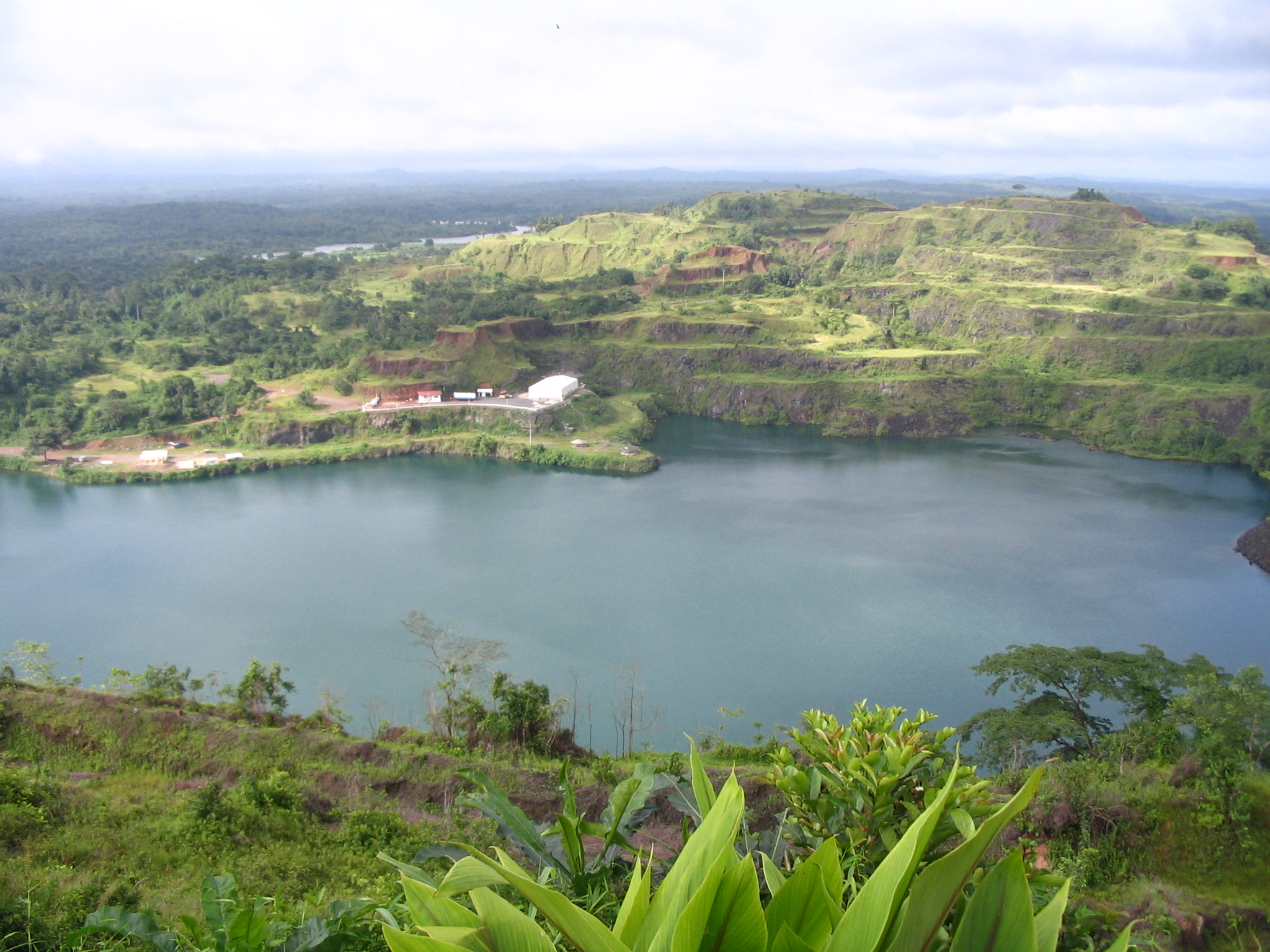
- Bomi Lake

- Flag

- Location in Liberia
- Coordinates: 6°45′N 10°45′W
- Country: Liberia
- Capital: Tubmanburg
- Districts: Dewoin District; Klay District; Senjeh District; Seuhn Mecca District
- Established: 1984

Government
  - Superintendent: Haja Washington

Area
  - Total: 1,932 km^{2} (746 sq mi)

Population (2022)
  - Total: 133,668
  - Density: 69.19/km^{2} (179.2/sq mi)
- Time zone: UTC+0 (GMT)
- ISO 3166 code: LR-BM
- HDI (2018): 0.427 low · 6th of 15

Bomi is a county in the northwestern portion of the West African nation of Liberia. The county was established in 1984. The county's area is 746 square miles (1,900 km^{2}).

Bomi is one of 15 counties that comprise the first-level of administrative division in the nation. Tubmanburg serves as the county's capital. The County has four administrative districts.

Bomi is bordered on the northwest by Grand Cape Mount County, on the northeast by Gbarpolu and Bong Counties, on the southeast by Montserrado County and on the southwest by the Atlantic Ocean. As of the 2022 Liberian census, Bomi had a population of 133,668, making it the nation's eleventh most populous county.

== History ==
From 1822 until the Liberian Declaration of Independence from the American Colonization Society on July 26, 1847, some 3,198 freed people of color from the United States and the Lesser Antilles came to Liberia with the help and support from the American Colonization Society and other organizations. The first settlers who left the Caribbean islands were from Barbados. The second set of 345 settlers who came from the Caribbean were from Trinidad and Tobago, followed by 620 from Saint Vincent and the Grenadines, another 350 from Saint Kitts and Nevis, and two groups from Grenada. The last group of settlers to arrive were from Saint Lucia.

Bomi County, formerly known as Bomi Territory, was first part of Montserrado County. The military regime of Samuel Doe established Bomi County in 1983. A legislative act later confirmed the County as being a separate entity. Bomi means “LIGHT” in the Gola language, recognizing the County's status as the first site for iron ore mining in Liberia.

The Liberia Mining Company extracted iron ore in the territory during the 1950s and 1960s. The company closed its operations in 1979.

== Geography, climate and seasons ==
Bomi County has an area of 746 square miles (1,900 km^{2}). The County is bordered on the northwest by Grand Cape Mount County, on the northeast by Gbarpolu and Bong Counties, on the southeast by Montserrado County and on the southwest by the Atlantic Ocean.

The Lofa River forms the boundary between Bomi and Grand Cape Mount Counties. A tributary of the river forms part of the boundary between Bomi and Gbarpolu Counties. The Saint Paul River forms part of the boundary between Bomi and Montserrado Counties.

Bomi County's climate is generally warm throughout the year. There are two seasons in the year - the rainy season which begins in April and ends in October and the dry season from November to March.

== Demographics ==
The 2008 Liberian census showed that Bomi County had a population of 84,119, making it the eleventh most populous county in Liberia. The County had at that time a population density of 113 persons per square mile (44 persons per km^{2}).

Bomi contains five chiefdoms and 18 clans. The County's principal ethnic groups are Gola, Dei, Mandinka and Kpelle.

== Resources and economy ==
Bomi County's resources include diamond, rubber, timber, iron ore, gold, water, stone, sand, and fertile agricultural land. Seventy percent of the population engages in agricultural activities, including the production or exploitation of rice (the staple food), cassava, sweet potatoes, eddoes, plantains, vegetables, rubber, palm oil, and livestock or in fisheries. 20% participate in business and trading. Local governments employ 10%. The Sime Darby rubber plantation, the second largest in Liberia, is located within the county.

== Administrative districts ==
Bomi is divided into four administrative districts:

- Dewoin District
- Klay District
- Senjeh District
- Seuhn Mecca District
