= Liberian national transitional government =

1994–97 provisional government

The Liberia national transitional government (abbreviated LNTG) was a provisional government, or rather the name given to three successive governments, in Liberia formed in the midst of the First Liberian Civil War. The LNTG was product of the July 25, 1993, Cotonou Peace Accord, whereby the Interim Government of National Unity disbanded. The respective LNTG-I, LNTG-II and LNTG-III governments were differentiated by being led by three different chairpersons (David Kpomakpor, Wilton G. S. Sankawulo, Ruth Perry). Initially supposed to last for six months to allow for disarmament of warring factions and preparations of national elections, the LNTG timeline lasted until mid-1997. Various of the warring factions had direct participation in the LNTG and civilian elements were gradually sidelined. Through participation in the provisional governance of LNTG the different warlords could gain access to state resources, even in situations when armed hostilities continued. The LNTG period ended with the 1997 Liberian general election whereby Charles Taylor was elected President of Liberia.

== July 25, 1993: Cotonou Peace Accord ==
As of 1993 civil war raged in Liberia. Diplomatic efforts sought to find an end to hostilities, with the Special Representative of the Secretary-General of the United Nations Trevor Gordon-Somers and Economic Community of West African States (ECOWAS) chairman and President of Benin Nicéphore Soglo, with support from United States Deputy Assistant Secretary of State for African Affairs Prudence Bushnell and Assistant Secretary of State for African Affairs George Moose, working to bring the warring parties to the negotiation table. Between July 10 and 17, 1993, peace talks were organized by ECOWAS in Geneva, supported by the United Nations, the United States and the Organization of African Unity (OAU). The Interim Government of National Unity (IGNU), the National Patriotic Front of Liberia (NPFL) and ULIMO were invited to the Geneva talks. The Geneva peace talks were soon followed by negotiations in Cotonou, hosted by President Soglo of Benin.

The Cotonou Peace Accord was signed on July 25, 1993, by IGNU, NPFL and ULIMO. President Amos Sawyer signed on behalf of IGNU, Alhaji G. V. Kromah signed on behalf of ULIMO and the NPFL signature was done by its vice president Enoch Dogolea. The agreement was co-signed by the government of Benin and other observers. In an emotional atmosphere, the leaders of the warring factions hugged each other at the end of the signing and the national anthem was sung.

The Cotonou Peace Accord assigned primary responsibility for implementation of the agreement to ECOMOG (ECOWAS peace-keeping force), with oversight from a UN observer missions. Notably NPFL leader Taylor refused to disarm his forces to the Nigerian-dominated ECOMOG, thus it was agreed that Egyptian, Tanzanian, Ugandan and Zimbabwean OAU troops would complement the ECOMOG forces (eventually some 1,500 Tanzanian and Uganda troops would arrive in January 1994, whilst Zimbabwe and Egypt never sent troops as the UN didn't allot funds for the purpose) as well as a UN observer mission. The agreement also provided amnesty for the warring factions and called for a cessation of hostilities by August 1, 1993. The Cotonou Peace Accord outlined encampment and disarmament of all factions. Buffer zones would be established along the borders of the country.

The Cotonous Peace Accord outlined that a Liberian National Transitional Government would be seated within 30 days of the signing of the agreement "concomitant with the commencement of the process of disarmament". Per the agreement the LNTG would consist of a 5-member Council of State (executive branch of government), a 35-member Transitional Legislative Assembly (with 13 members from NPFL, 13 from IGNU and 9 from ULIMO), a 5-member Supreme Court and a 7-member Elections Commission. The agreement outlined that IGNU and the National Patriotic Reconstruction Assembly Government (NPRAG) of the NPFL would be disbanded once the LNTG would be seated. Per the Cotonou Peace Accord the warring factions would name representatives to a five-member Council of State with a civilian chairperson and 2 vice chairs. In the Council of State 2 seats would be given to IGNU, 2 seats to ULIMO and 1 seat given to NPFL. National elections were scheduled for February 1994, in which Council of State members would be barred from running as candidates.

== Post-Cotonou negotiations on the seating of LNTG ==
After the signing of the Cotonou Peace Accord, the actual installation of the new government suffered significant delays due to various squabbles over government posts. Eight months would pass before the transitional legislature would hold its first meeting. Effectively IGNU continued to operate whilst the disputes were taking place over LNTG posts. On August 16, 1993, the Liberian factions, holding a meeting in Cotonou, elected Bismarck Kuyon (the erstwhile Interim Legislative Assembly speaker) of IGNU as the chairman of the Council of State. Dorothy Musuleng-Cooper (NPFL, the erstwhile NPRAG Education Minister) and Mohammed Sheriff (ULIMO) were elected the vice chairs of the Council of State. Other Council of State members were David Kpomakpor (IGNU, a former justice of the Supreme Court of Liberia) and Thomas Ziah (ULIMO). The UNOMIL observer mission arrived in Liberia in September 1993.

On October 20, 1993, NPFL removed Musuleng-Cooper from her post as vice chairperson of the Council of State, and was replaced by Isaac Musa.

On November 3, 1993, the three signatories met once again in Cotonou. The delegations held 3 days of talks there, after which the factions had agreed on the repartition of posts in the Council of State, Supreme Court, Electoral Commission, Legislature and 13 out of the 17 ministerial posts. But no agreement was reach on the ministerial portfolios for Foreign Affairs, Justice, Finance and Defense, and negotiations broke down. Frustrated by the lack of progress President Soglo ordered the delegations to leave Cotonou at once and issued a 10-day ultimatum to the Liberian factions to resolve the outstanding issues.

The IGNU President Sawyer opposed moving forward with installing the LNTG until disarmament of factions had begun. The Council of State chairman Kuyon would begin to distance himself from IGNU, moving towards a position of allowing installation of LNTG without the fulfillment of the preconditions of disarmament. On November 15, 1993, IGNU removed Kuyon from the Council of State, and replaced him on the council by Philip A. Z. Banks, III (IGNU Justice Minister). The removal of Kuyon was met with protest from NPFL, ULIMO and sections within IGNU. Subsequently, a new INGU nominee, law professor David Kpomakpor, was named as the new Council of State chairman.

By early December 1993 talks resumed at Hotel Africa in Monrovia, where heated discussions took place. NPFL negotiators objected to the presence of ECOWAS, UN and OAU representatives at the talks, whilst the ECOMOG Chief of Staff Gen. Femi Williams called for disarmament of factions prior to the installation of LNTG (a position which brought strong reactions from ULIMO and NPFL representatives). The United States government pressured the parties to reach an agreement, threatening to withdraw support to Liberia if an agreement could not be reached by February 15, 1994. Sawyer and his followers eventually caved in, agreeing to the LNTG to be seated March 7, 1994, without having reached any progress on disarmament. The Liberian factions signed an agreement on the day of the U.S. deadline, February 15, 1994. The February 15, 1994, agreement signed between IGNU, NPFL and ULIMO came to be nick-named the 'Triple 7 Agreement' as it outlined three key processes to be achieved by March 7, 1994; installation of the LNTG, commencing disarmament of armed factions and deployment of ECOMOG and UNOMIL peacekeepers across the entire country. The agreement outlined that national elections would be held within 6 months of the seating of LNTG, i.e. September 7, 1994.

In late February 1994 Assistant Secretary of State for African Affairs Moose visited Liberia, exterting pressure on warring factions to cooperate with ECOMOG. The United States wanted the LNTG to the installed rapidly, and did not consider commencing disarmament as essential precondition for the seating the new transitional government. The Council of State consisting of Kpomakpor (chairman), Isaac Musa, Mohamed Sheriff, Philip A. Z. Banks, III and Dexter Tahyor was confirmed through chairman elections at the Riverview Conference on February 28, 1994.

In March 1994 factional dispute broke out in ULIMO following to the removal of Thomas Ziah from the Council of State. During a March 1, 1994, vote ULIMO representative Thomas Ziah refused to support the ULIMO candidate Mohamed Sheriff in the election for the post as Council of State chairman. Instead Kpomakpor was elected by 3 votes to 2. On March 3, 1994, Kromah declared Ziah removed from his role in the Council of State and ordered the disarmament of Krahn combattants within ULIMO ranks. ULIMO field commander Roosevelt Johnson rejected the removal of Ziah and on March 6, 1993, Johnson declared himself as the new head of ULIMO – thus ULIMO was split into the Mandingo-dominated ULIMO-Kromah (ULIMO-K) and Krahn-dominated ULIMO-Johnson (ULIMO-J). ULIMO-J expelled Kromah from his headquarters in Tubmanburg and seized control over Bomi County, Grand Cape Mount County and the lower parts of Lofa County. Dexter Tahyor, a compromise candidate, took over Ziah's former seat in the Council of State.

== March 7, 1994: Installation of LNTG ==
The LNTG Council of State was finally sworn in on March 7, 1994, with Kpomakpor as the Council of State chairman and Musa and Sheriff as vice chairs. Chief Justice J. Everett Bull officiated the oath-taking ceremony. The inauguration of LNTG was attended by President Soglo of Benin and foreign diplomats. Thousands of Monrovia residents took to the streets to celebrate the supposed end of the four-years civil war. After the installation of LNTG, ECOMOG forces began to deploy throughout the country – assisted by some 1,500 OAU troops from Tanzania and Uganda and 368 unarmed UN military observers. By this point IGNU and NPRAG ceased to function.

In reality the LNTG only ran affairs in Monrovia itself whilst the NPFL controlled most of rest of the country. The government was completely dependent on international donors for its finances. The Kpomakpor-led Council of State did not function well, as the Cotonou Peace Accord prescribed that unanimity was necessary for decision-making in the council.

And whilst the LNTG Council of State had now been installed on March 7, 1994, the installations of the other government institutions (ministerial cabinet, legislature, etc.) remained illusive. The United States government stated that they would only recognize the LNTG government once it held effective control over the entire country.

Taylor didn't allow NPFL representatives to assume LNTG government positions whilst negotiations over sharing of key posts continued. He insisted that NPFL be given the Justice and Foreign Affairs ministerial portfolios.

But in March 1994 three NPFL ministerial nominees - the erstwhile NPRAG Defense Minister Tom Woewiyu, the NPRAG Justice Minister Laveli Supuwood and the NPRAG Internal Affairs Minister Sam Dokie – rebelled after they shifted from Gbarnga to Monrovia to take their cabinet posts in LNTG. In April 1994 they agreed to undergo the vetting process in front of the Transitional Legislative Assembly, in defiance of Taylor's orders. In response Taylor announced that the trio's LNTG ministerial nominations would be revoked, but the LNTG would argue that it would not interfere in the internal lives of the signing factions and thus allowed the trio to retain their ministerial posts. The trio formed the National Patriotic Front of Liberia – Central Revolutionary Council (NPFL-CRC), and called for cooperation with ECOMOG and speedy disarmament. The NPFL-CRC, based in Monrovia, declared Taylor removed from the NPFL leadership. The NPFL split and Taylor's isolation from the LNTG ministerial cabinet enabled his opponents to gain access to financial revenue from the control of the ship registry.

== May 12, 1994: LNTG cabinet constituted ==
The LNTG ministerial cabinet was finally formed on May 12, 1994. The last remaining issue, over which weeks of negotiations had been held, had been the naming of the Minister of Foreign Affairs. Eventually, NPFL nominee Dorothy Musuleng-Cooper was accepted as the LNTG Minister of Foreign Affairs. The NPFL-CRC trio would hold the ministerial portfolios for Labor (Woewiyu), Justice (Supuwood) and Internal Affairs (Dokie) in the LNTG ministerial cabinet.

== September 1994: Akosombo Agreement ==
The installation of LNTG failed to contain violence. By mid-1994 the ULIMO factional conflict had driven ULIMO-K to retreat to Lofa County, where more violence ensued. And with the mandate of LTNG expiring in September 1994, there was pressure to reach a new agreement that would allow for a mandate extension. In August 1994 the new ECOWAS chair, Ghanaian president Jerry Rawlings, called on the Liberian faction to come to Accra for talks. LNTG, UN and OAU were invited to act as facilitators for the talks.

On September 12, 1994, the Akosombo Agreement was signed by NPFL (Charles Taylor), ULIMO-K (Alhaji Kromah) and the AFL (Hezekiah Bowen). The Agreement outlined that there would be a five-member Council of State (including Taylor from NPFL, Kromah from ULIMO-K, Bowen from AFL, one member nominated jointly by Taylor and Kromah and one member from the Liberian National Conference 'of political and civic groups'). It provided for decision-making by simple majority votes in the Council of State. The Council of State would have a rotating chairman post. Whilst the Agreement gave authority to ECOMOG to manage borders, disarmament and arms searches, it also provided for the LNTG to be able to use force in cooperation with ECOMOG. The agreement gave LNTG responsibility to restructure Liberian military with assistance from ECOMOG, UN and friendly governments, for the armed forces to include people from all warring factions.

The Akosombo Agreement stipulated that a new LNTG ministerial cabinet would be formed and that the Transitional Legislative Assembly be expanded from 35 to 49 members (one additional member would be added from each of the 13 counties of Liberia). National elections would be scheduled for October 1995 if conditions of disarmament and demobilization of warring factions had been met. The Ghanaian government was the sole mediator during the Akosombo talks process.

At the time of the signing of the Akosombo Agreement intense fighting raged across Liberia. Taylor had been expelled from his headquarters in Gbargna and Kromah had lost his headquarters in Tubmanburg. In south-eastern Liberia NPFL and LPC clashed, whilst in the central regions NPFL and ULIMO-J fought over territory. The Akosombo Agreement did not include NPFL-CRC, ULIMO-J, the Lofa Defense Force (LDF) or the Liberian Peace Council (LPC), in spite of the fact that these groups combined now controlled large swaths of territory in Liberia. LPC and the LDF were invited to the talks, but abstained from attending. ULIMO-J were present in Akosombo but did not sign the agreement (later they did however send a letter to President Rawlings of Ghana, declaring their endorsement of the Akosombo Agreement).

Adekeye Adebajo referred to the Akosombo document as 'a warlord's agreement'. The agreement provided opportunities for the faction leaders to join the Council of State themselves and provide a platform for their presidential ambitions. Direct participation of faction leaders in the Council of State and LNTG role in supervising disarmament had been key demands of Taylor in the negotiations, and the Akosombo Agreement granted both of these provisions. Kpomakpor, other Monrovia-based civilian politicians, civil society organizations and church leaders opposed the Akosombo Agreement. The LNTG representative present at the Akosombo talks, Milton Teahjay, argued that the Akosombo Agreement 'transferred power from a civilian administration to a military junta'. The LNTG protested against General Bowen signing the agreement as a faction leader, and demanded his resignation (an order that Bowen and the AFL refused to comply with).

On September 15, 1994, General Charles Julu, leading a group of AFL soldiers, staged a military coup against the LNTG. The soldiers seized the Executive Mansion and declared Kpomakpor removed from power. But General Julu was attacked by ECOMOG forces and expelled from the Executive Mansion. ECOMOG moved to seize armaments from AFL at the Barclay Training Center and other locations. Kpomakpor, in his role as Commander-in-Chief of the armed forces, moved to remove AFL Chief of Staff Hezekiah Bowen and Moses Wright (both Krahn) from their AFL posts for having known about General Julu's coup plans without intervening. The AFL refused to comply with the Kpomakpor's order, leading to further ECOMOG-AFL clashes.

On November 21, 1994, Ghanaian president Rawlings invited all seven Liberian factions to peace talks at Burma Camp barracks in Accra. The peace talks were sponsored by ECOWAS, UN and United States. On December 21, 1994, the Akosombo Accord signatories (Bowen of AFL, Taylor of NPFL, Kromah of ULIMO-K) were joined by 4 other factions in signing the 'Accra Clarification of the Akosombo Accord'. Francois Massaquoi signed on behalf of LDF, George Boley on behalf of LPC, Tom Woewiyu on behalf of NPFL-CRC and Roosevelt Johnson on behalf of ULIMO-J. Baryogar Junius, representative of the Liberian National Conference, signed on behalf of civil society. Per the Accra Clarification the seats in the Council of State would be divided as follows; 1 seat for NPFL, 1 seat for ULIMO-K, 1 seat for the Coalition Forces (alliance of AFL, NPFL-CRC, LDF, LPC, ULIMO-J), 1 seat for the Liberian National Conference and 1 seat allocated to chief Tamba Tailor, a respected traditional chief of the Kisi Chiefdom in Lofa County. Chief Tailor, over 90 years old, would become the new Council of State chairman. The Accra Clarification was never implemented. The new Council of State was supposed to coordinate disarmament of factions and reorganize the armed forces together with ECOMOG, and prepare for national elections in November 1995. This Council of State was supposed to be installed on January 14, 1995, following a planned December 28, 1994, ceasefire. But the installation was never happened. Fighting in Liberia continued, and the factions failed to agree on nominations of Council of State members.

== August–September 1995: Abuja I Accord and formation of LNTG-II ==
On May 19, 1995, an ECOWAS summit was held in Abuja. At the summit peace negotiations were organized by Nigerian president Sani Abacha and Ghanaian president Rawlings. Other presidents attending were Gnassingbé Eyadéma (Togo), Alpha Oumar Konaré (Mali), Henri Konan Bédié (Ivory Coast), Yahya Jammeh (The Gambia) and Valentine Strasser (Sierra Leone). All Liberian faction leaders attended, except Charles Taylor (NPFL was represented by its vice president Dogolea). Talks broke down over differences on restructuring the Council of State and its composition. NPFL demanded that Tamba Tailor be named chairman, Charles Taylor the first vice chair, Kromah the second vice chair and Bowen third vice chair.

A second round of talks in began in Abuja on August 17, 1995, chaired by Ghanaian Foreign Minister Obed Asamoah On August 19, 1995, the Abuja I Accord was signed by Charles Taylor (NPFL), Kromah (ULIMO-K), Boley (LPC), Johnson (ULIMO-J), Bowen (AFL), Massquoi (LDF) and Woewiyu (NPFL-CRC), while Chea Cheapoo signed on behalf of LNC. Four leaders signed as witnesses: Asomoah, Nigerian Foreign Minister Chief Tom Ikimi, OAU eminent person on Liberia Rev. Canaan Banana and UN secretary-general special representative on Liberia Anthony Nyaki. AFL and ULIMO-J had been hesitant to sign, but were pressured by the Nigerian government. The Abuja I Accord became the 13th formal peace agreement signed during the six years of war in Liberia. Like the Akosombo Agreement and the Accra Clarification, the Abuja I Accord sought to amend, clarify and supplement the Cotonou Peace Accord.

Through the Abujan I Accord, the LNTG-II was established. The new government was given a 12-month mandate. The LNTG-II Council of State was expanded to six members and was to be led by a civilian chair, Wilton G. S. Sankawulo. President Abacha of Nigeria and President Rawlings of Ghana had pressured the Liberian factions to accept Sankawulo as the new chairman. Per the Abujan I Accord, each of three key faction leaders (Charles Taylor, Alhaji Kromah, George Boley) were personally represented as vice chairmen of the Council of State, with the latter representing the Coalition Forces. The remaining two vice chairmen of the council were Oscar J. Quiah and Tamba Tailor. On August 31, 1995, Charles Taylor and Alhaji Kromah arrived in Monrovia, to join the other Council of State members at the swearing-in ceremony of the new government. The new government was formally inaugurated on September 1, 1995. Ghanaian president Rawlings attended the event. There was widespread celebration in Monrovia. Subsequently, in his first major announcement as new Council of State chair, Sankawulo, stated that the government would issue a comprehensive plan to restructure the (Krahn-dominated) AFL.

Two weeks after installation of LNTG-II fresh clashes broke out between ULIMO-K and ULIMO-J.

The LNTG-II ministerial cabinet was sworn in on September 26, 1995. The cabinet had 16 ministers. The LNTG-II cabinet effectively enabled warlords to access state resources from participating in government, while allowing them to maintain their own fiefdoms and continue to engage in irregular warfare with each other over territorial control. The Council of State chair Sankawulo was a respected Professor of Literature but had a weak role in the government as he lacked military capacity and popular support. As for the two other civilian in the Council of State, Quiah was a former minister from the government of Samuel Doe and considered close to the Coalition Forces and the elderly Chief Tamba Tailor was illiterate and barely spoke English (and thus generally excluded from Council meetings). In the new LNTG-II cabinet Roosevelt Johnson of ULIMO-J, Hezekiah Bowen of AFL, Tow Woewiyu and Sam Dokie of NPFL-CRC and Francois Massaquoi of LDF were named as government ministers, from the Coalition Forces quota. Bowen was effectively demoted from Council of State member to role as nominal Minister of Defense. Johnson had not been given a Council of State post, but ULIMO-J received four ministerial posts. The increased participation of warlords in government occurred at the expense of ex-IGNU sectors that lost ministerial representation. During the repartition of ministerial portfolios Charles Taylor did not necessarily claim the posts that would enable long-term financial benefits, rather focusing on securing the posts that would enable him to strategically increase his influence over the country. NPFL gained the portfolios of Foreign Affairs, Agriculture (which gave control over the rubber industry), Information, Justice (enabling dominance over police and judiciary) and Internal Affairs (in-charge of hinterland administration). With NPFL leading the Ministry of Justice, Taylor could convert the police forces in Monrovia to a de facto NPFL paramilitary force and thus giving him an important foothold inside the capital. During LNTG-II (and the subsequent LNTG-III) period Charles Taylor and Alhaji Kromah at times had a cooperative relationship, thus weakening the influence of other factions.

Between December 1995 and January 1996 there was heavy fighting between ECOMOG and ULIMO-J forces.

== April 1996 – Siege of Monrovia ==
In March 1996 Roosevelt Johnson was dismissed as Minister for Rural Development. The ULIMO-J nominee in Central Bank of Liberia Ignatius Clay, an important source of revenue for Johnson, was sacked. These move contributed to tensions with ULIMO-J. On April 6, 1996, the Council of State attempted to arrest Johnson on charges of murder. Johnson and his forces gathered at the AFL barracks, where they were joined by LPC and ex-AFL Krahn fighters. Johnson and his allies were confronted by NPFL and ULIMO-K forces. Some 3,000 people were killed during these clashes. The peace process was set aback by the clashes. The fighting in Monrovia in April 1996 further exposed the relative weakness of LNTG.

== Abuja II Accord and installation of LNTG-III ==
On August 17, 1996, the Abuja II Accord was signed. The Abuja II Accord outlined a new Council of State led by former senator Ruth Perry, immediate ceasefire, disarmament by January 1997, national elections and sanctions for violators of the Accord. The LNTG-III Council of State chaired by Perry was installed on August 23, 1996. During the LNTG-III regime encampment and disarmament of factions progressed slowly, beginning in mid-November 1996. By early February 1997 an estimated 24,500 out of 33,000 fighters had been disarmed.

As the Abuja II Agreement didn't allow sitting Council of State members to contest elections, on February 28, 1997, Charles Taylor, Alhaji Kromah and George Boley resigned from their Council posts to launch their respective presidential candidatures in the upcoming general election. The departing faction leaders turned presidential hopefuls each handpicked their replacements from their respective factions. Taylor named the former LNTG-II Minister of Information Victoria Refell as his replacement in the Council of State. Weade Kobbah Wureh replaced Boley and Vamba Kanneh replaced Kromah on the Council of State.

Under the Abuja II Agreement, Roosevelt Johnson returned to the ministerial cabinet as new Minister for Transport by the end of September. In late September 1996 Francis Y.S. Garlawolu was replaced as Justice Minister by Gloria Scott, who was also a NPFL nominee. In November Scott was appointed as chair of the Elections Commissions, and NPFL nominee Peter Jallah was named new Justice Minister.

In terms of the political processes, the implementation of Abuja II progressed. On April 7, 1997, the Independent Elections Commission (IECOM) and the Supreme Court were installed in Monrovia. Elections were scheduled for May 30, 1997, but later postponed to July 19, 1997. Once the elections were eventually held Charles Taylor was elected President of Liberia with over 75% of the votes.

== LNTG institutions ==
=== Council of State ===
	LNTG-I	LNTG-II	LNTG-III	
Transitional Council of State named August 16, 1993	Transitional Council of State installed March 7, 1994	Council of State installed September 1, 1995	Council of State installed August 23, 1996	Council of State February 28, 1997
Bismarck Kuyon (IGNU, chair)	David Kpomakpor (IGNU, chair)	Wilton G. S. Sankawulo (chair)	Ruth Perry (chair)	
Dorothy Musuleng-Cooper (NPFL)	Isaac Musa (NPFL)	Charles Taylor (NPFL)		Victoria Refell (NPFL)
Mohamed Sheriff (ULIMO)		Alhaji G. V. Kromah (ULIMO-K)		Vamba Kanneh (ULIMO-K)
Thomas Ziah (ULIMO)	Dexter Tahyor (ULIMO)	George Boley (Coalition)		Weade Wureh (Coalition)
David Kpomakpor (IGNU)	Philip A. Z. Banks, III (IGNU)	Oscar J. Quiah (LNC)		
		Tamba Tailor		

=== Ministerial cabinets ===
Ministerial portfolio	LNTG-I	LNTG-II	LNTG-III
Agriculture	Roland Massaquoi (NPFL) (Note: Per data from the Ministry William D. Towah (ULIMO nominee and Deputy Minister for Administration) served as Acting Minister of Agriculture for a period in 1994)		
Commerce and Industry	Lusinee Kamara (ULIMO)	Lusinee Kamara (ULIMO-K)	Lusinee Kamara/Thomas Braimah (ULIMO-K) (Note: Thomas Braimah named new Minister of Commerce and Industry on February 28, 1997)
Defense	Sande Ware (IGNU)	Hezekiah Bowen (AFL)	
Education	Levi Zangai (IGNU)	Moses Bah (LPC)	
Finance	Wilson Tarpeh (ULIMO)	Lansana Kromah (ULIMO-K)	
Foreign Affairs	Dorothy Musuleng-Cooper (NPFL) (Note: Whilst Musuleng-Cooper belonged to the NPFL and had been nominated to represent NPFL in the Council of State, she was nominated to the ministerial post from Council of State quota)	Momolu Sirleaf (NPFL)	
Health and Social Welfare	Robert Kpoto (ULIMO)	Vamba Kanneh (ULIMO-K)	Vamba Kanneh (ULIMO-K)/Jonathan Johnson (ULIMO-K) (Note: Johnson named new Minister of Health and Social Justice on February 28, 1997)
Information	Joe Mulbah (NPFL)	Victoria Refell (NPFL)	Joe Mulbah (NPFL)
Internal Affairs	Samuel Dokie (NPFL)	Nanjohn Suah (NPFL)	Edward Sackor (NPFL)
Justice	Laveli Supuwood (NPFL)	Francis Y.S. Garlawolu (NPFL)	Gloria Scott (NPFL)/Peter Bonner Jallah (NPFL) (Note: Jallah replaced Scott as Minister of Justice in November 1996)
Labor	Tom Woewiyu (NPFL)	Tom Woewiyu (NPFL-CRC)	
Lands, Mines and Energy	Wehyee Dekyee (NPFL)	Jenkins Dunbar (NPFL)	
Planning and Economic Affairs	Amelia Ward (IGNU)	Francis M. Carbah (LPC)	?
Post and Telecommunications	Roosevelt Jayjay (IGNU)	Alfred Kollie (LPC)	
Public Works		Varlee Keita (ULIMO-K)	
Rural Development	Samuel Brownell (ULIMO)	Roosevelt Johnson (ULIMO-J) (Note: Johnson held the post until March 1996, vacant thereafter)	
Transport	Sam Mahn (ULIMO)	Armah Youlo (ULIMO-J)	Roosevelt Johnson (ULIMO-J) (Note: When Johnson assumed the post as Minister of Transport in LNTG-III in late September 1996, it had been vacant for a while)
Youth and Sports	Conmany Wesseh (IGNU)	Francois Massaquoi (LDF)	
Minister of State for Presidential Affairs		Monie Captan	
Minister of Without Portfolio	Manyu Kamara (ULIMO)	Bai M. Gbala (ULIMO-J)	
Minister of Without Portfolio	Ansumana Kromah (ULIMO)	Alieu Sheriff (ULIMO-K)	

=== Transitional Legislative Assembly ===
Transitional Legislative Assembly, as nominated October 1993
Name	Faction	County	Committee Chairmanship (incomplete listing)
Morris Dukuly (Speaker) (Note: Morris Dukuly resigned from his post on February 28, 1997, to contest election for senatorial seat in Bomi County. He was replaced by Lusinee Kamara, former Minister of Finance and Commerce)	ULIMO	Bomi County	
James K. Giko (First Deputy Speaker)	IGNU		
Augustine J. Zayzay (Second Deputy Speaker)	NPFL	Lofa County	
Ishmael Pailey Campbell	IGNU	Sinoe County	Judiciary
James Gwaikolo	IGNU	Nimba County	Ways and Finance
Francis Johnson	IGNU		
Baryogar Junius	IGNU		
Ben O. Kiahoun	IGNU	Bomi County	Rules and Orders
David Menyongar	IGNU	Margibi County	Executive Committee
Joseph Sando	IGNU		
Swen Sayentue	IGNU		
Alfred J. Tue Sr.	IGNU	Montserrado County	Youth and Sports
J. Kankon Toe	IGNU	Grand Kru County	
Dusty Wolokolie	IGNU	Lofa County	Foreign Affairs
Benjamin Mulbah Togbah	IGNU		
Mohamed Dukuly	NPFL	Bomi County	Banks and Currency
Louise Brown	NPFL	Grand Bassa County	Information, Cultural Affairs and Tourism
Grace Minor	NPFL	Montserrado County	
Augustine Nyensuah	NPFL	Sinoe County	
Mary Sumo	NPFL	Bong County	
Martin Bloh	NPFL	Maryland County	
Bedell Fahn	NPFL	Margibi County	
Teah Farcathy	NPFL	Grand Kru County	
Peter Fineboy	NPFL	Grand Gedeh County	
George Korkor	NPFL	Nimba County	
Frank Sambola	NPFL	Grand Cape Mount County	
Samuel Geevon Smith	NPFL	Rivercess County	Post and Telecommunications
Varfley Abraham Dolleh	ULIMO	Lofa County	Maritime Affairs
James Neblett	ULIMO	Margibi County	Labor
Alhaji Seney Bility	ULIMO	Montserrado County	
Joseph Tarbior	ULIMO	Grand Bassa County	
David Togbah	ULIMO	Grand Gedeh County	
George Dweh	ULIMO	Grand Gedeh County	Investment and Concessions
Peter Wilson	ULIMO		
Jerry Goryon	ULIMO	Nimba County	

=== Governor of the Central Bank of Liberia ===
Name	Faction	Tenure
Raleigh Seekie	ULIMO	Until January 1996
Ignatius Clay	ULIMO-J	January 10, 1996 – March 1996
Eisenhower York		March 9, 1996 – September 1996
Ignatius Clay	ULIMO-J	September 1996–

== See also ==
- United Nations Security Council Resolution 950
- United Nations Security Council Resolution 1020
