= Abuja Accord (Liberia) =

The Abuja Agreement was a peace treaty signed on 19 August 1995 in an attempt to secure peace from National Patriotic Front of Liberia leader, Charles Taylor in the First Liberian Civil War. The agreement was another in a list of treaties attempting to bring peace to Liberia, being preceded by the Cotonou Peace Accord on 25 July 1993, the Akosombo Agreement on 12 August 1994, and its Accra Clarification.

The agreement set up a Council of State of Liberia, which was to consist of a chair, and five members: Charles Taylor, LTG. G. V. Kromah (United Liberation Movement of Liberia for Democracy), Dr. George Boley Sr. (LNC), Oscar Jaryee Quiah (Liberian National Conference), and Chief Tamba Tailor. According to the accords, the first holder of the rotating chairmanship was to be Wilton G. S. Sankawulo, but the position was actually first held by David D. Kpormakor. The council's third and final chair, Ruth Perry, handed power to Taylor following elections in July 1997.
