= Christopher Minikon =

Liberian politician and businessman

Ambassador Christopher T. Minikon
- Tugba Moseh
- Pronunciation: To͞o-ɡ͡ba Môs-sɛ
- Born: Christopher Tugba Moseh (Moses); May 24, 1933; Grand Cess, Grand Kru County, Liberia
- Died: July 4, 2019 (aged 86); Rockville, Maryland
- Resting place: Gate of Heaven Cemetery (Silver Spring, Maryland); 39.0848306,-77.0685806
- Citizenship: Republic of Liberia
- Education: St. Patrick's High School (Liberia); Xavier University of Louisiana; Marquette University; Fletcher School of Law and Diplomacy
- Alma mater: Tufts University
- Occupations: Diplomat, politician, Ambassador, professor, Educator
- Years active: 1960–2010
- Employer(s): Republic of Liberia, United Nations, University of Liberia
- Organization(s): Knights of Saint John International, Liberia, Liberian Historical Society
- Known for: Charitable Works, Service to Liberia for 50+ Years, Educational Influence, Honesty, Integrity, Social Justice
- Title: Honorable, Counsellor, Ambassador, professor
- Relatives: Thomas John Jackson, Urias McGill, Patrick Minikon

Christopher Minikon (May 24, 1933 – July 4, 2019) was a Liberian public servant, statesman, ambassador, professor, historian, and businessman. Minikon served various lower-level and Cabinet-Level positions in the Liberian government in the administrations of William Tubman, William R. Tolbert, Samuel K. Doe, Amos Sawyer, David D. Kpormakpor, Wilton G. S. Sankawulo, Ruth Perry, Charles Taylor, Moses Blah, Gyude Bryant, and Ellen Johnson Sirleaf. While working various positions, he also taught classes at The University of Liberia on various subjects such as, history, diplomacy, law, and others.

== Early life ==
Christopher Tugba Moseh (Moses) Minikon was born in Grand Cess, Grand Kru County, Liberia to the union of Beatrice T. Minikon (née: Jackson), a midwife, nurse, and teacher and Anthony Minikon Moseh, Esq. a lawyer, teacher and translator for the Catholic Church in Maryland County, Liberia. Minikon is the first of 10 children. Both of Minikon's parents are of mixed ancestry in including Congau, Fante, Kru, and subsequently African-American and European ancestries.

Minikon was raised in the Roman Catholic faith and attended a local Catholic primary school in Maryland County, Liberia.

== Education ==
After attending primary and secondary school at the mission, Minikon was sent to school in the segregated United States of America. Minikon earned a Bachelor of Arts from Xavier University of Louisiana, a Master of Arts from Marquette University, a Master of Arts in Law and Diplomacy from Fletcher School of Law and Diplomacy, and a research degree from Tufts University.

== Career ==
In the early 1960s, Minikon became an instructor at the University of Liberia, teaching courses in history, diplomacy, law, Latin, and others. Per the request of President William Tubman, Minikon was appointed the position of Research Officer for the Ministry of Foreign Affairs. During the 1960s and 70s, Minikon held a number of positions such as Director of European Affairs—Ministry of Foreign Affairs, Director of International Organizations—Ministry of Foreign Affairs. In 1973, he was appointed Counsellor of the United Nations Permanent Mission of Liberia, in New York City. In 1978, he was appointed as an Ambassador to South Korea, from then on he held several Ambassador positions in South East Asia, and Europe. Minikon held positions such as an advisor in International Affairs, assistant foreign minister for Afro-Asian affairs, Foreign Minister, Chargé d’affairs for the Republic of Liberia. Minikon worked in several transitional and interim governments in Liberia. In the early 1990s, Minikon was an advisor in seven peace conferences during the First Liberian Civil War, Banjul III Agreement (1990-10-24), Bamako Ceasefire Agreement (1990-11-28), Banjul IV Agreement (1990-12-21), Lomé Agreement (1991-02-13), Yamoussoukro IV Peace Agreement (1991-10-30), Geneva Agreement 1992 (1992-04-07), Cotonou Peace Agreement (1993-07-25), Akosombo Peace Agreement (1994-09-12), Accra Agreements/Akosombo clarification agreement (1994-12-21) and the Abuja Peace Agreement (1995-08-19). He was a key player in the 1999 peace talks with Foday Sankoh during the Second Liberian Civil War, he was an advisor during the Accra Comprehensive Peace Agreement. In the early 2000s Minikon served as an advisor to UNMIL and the OAU He was an advocate for the Liberian people during the Liberian Civil Wars especially for the over 700,000 Liberian refugees in Guinea. Ambassador Minikon passively retired in 2010. He was a prominent figure in many Liberian circles and is considered one of the finest statesmen in foreign service in Liberia.

== Personal life ==
A staunch Roman Catholic, Minikon was Knights of Saint John International, Liberia's first Grand President, at Sacred Heart Cathedral in Monrovia. He remained a member of the fraternal organization, until his death. In 1960, he married Bernadette M. S. Minikon, a descendant Elijah Johnson through his son, Liberia’s 11th President, Hilary R. W. Johnson and she is also a part of the Roberts family of Liberia. Together, the Minikons have 7 children, 9 grandchildren, and 2 great-grandchildren.
