= Wilton G. S. Sankawulo =

Head of state of Liberia from 1995 to 1996

Wilton Gbakolo Sengbe Sankawulo, Sr

Chairman of the Council of State of Liberia
- In office 1 September 1995 – 3 September 1996
- Deputy: George Boley; G. V. Kromah; Oscar Quiah; Tamba Tailor; Charles Taylor
- Preceded by: David D. Kpormakor
- Succeeded by: Ruth Perry

Personal details
- Born: 26 July 1937 Haindii, Liberia
- Died: 21 February 2009 (aged 71) Monrovia, Liberia
- Party: Unity Party
- Education: Cuttington University; Pacific Lutheran Theological Seminary; University of Iowa

Wilton Gbakolo Sengbe Sankawulo Sr. (26 July 1937 – 21 February 2009) was a Liberian politician and author who served as the leader of Liberia from 1 September 1995 until 3 September 1996, as chairman of the Council of State.

== Biography ==
Sankawulo was born in 1937 in Haindi in Lower Bong County. He began his education in kpolopele Lutheran Mission, near Handi, and continued another Lutheran mission school graduating from the Lutheran Institute in 1959. He entered Cuttington College and Divinity School (now Cuttington University) in 1960. He began his literary career thereby publishing his short stories in the Cuttington Review, the college's literary magazine. Upon his graduation in 1963, he was awarded a fellowship to study at Sacred Theology at the Pacific Lutheran Theological Seminary in Berkeley, California. He earned his master's degree in divinity and subsequently attended a writers' workshop at the University of Iowa, which led him to earn a second master's degree in English.

Upon his return to Liberia in the late 1960s, Sankawulo was employed at the Department of Information and Cultural Affairs (now Ministry of Information, Culture, and Tourism), where he served first in the Press Bureau and was later appointed Director of the Overseas Press Bureau. During this time, he maintained a teaching position at the University of Liberia, where he rose to the post of associate professor from 1985 until 1990. He also taught English and Literature at his alma mater, Cuttington.

Sankawulo began his fame as a writer in the early 1970s. In 1974, he published The Marriage of Wisdom, and Other Tales, a collection of Liberian stories. He subsequently published Why Nobody Knows When He Will Die. In 1979, he wrote a novel, The Rain and the Night. He also authored Sundown at Dawn: A Liberian Odyssey and produced an anthology of African stories entitled More Modern African African Stories. His novel Birds Are Singing was posthumously published in 2010.

When William R. Tolbert became president in 1971, Sankawulo, while still in the employ of the Ministry of Information, wrote a biography of the new president entitled Tolbert of Liberia. After serving as Research Specialist at the Ministry of Information, Sankawulo was transferred to the Executive Mansion, where he spent almost a year as Assistant Minister of State for Presidential Affairs. He served as Director-General of the Cabinet from 1983 until 1985 and subsequently as Special Assistant for Academic Affairs to President Samuel K. Doe. It was in the latter position, as Doe's teacher, that he helped Doe to complete his academic work, leading to Doe's graduation from the University of Liberia in 1989.

Sankawulo served as the leader of Liberia from 1 September 1995, until 3 September 1996, as chairman of the Council of State, which then governed Liberia. The council functioned as a collective presidency of the Liberia National Transitional Government. His predecessor, from March 1994 to September 1995, was David Kpomakpor. The council of the state consisted of a civilian chair and members Charles Taylor, United Liberation Movement of Liberia for Democracy-K leader Alhaji Kromah, Liberia Peace Council leader George Boley, and two other civilians.

Sankawulo stepped down from office on 3 September 1996, and was succeeded by Ruth Perry as chairwoman of this Council of State, who served until 2 August 1997, when she handed power to Charles Taylor, following elections held in July 1997.

Sankawulo died from congestive heart failure on 21 February 2009. He was 71 years old. He had been hospitalized for three weeks prior to his death at the John F. Kennedy Memorial Hospital in Monrovia.

Preceded by David D. Kpormakor	Chairman of the Council of State of Liberia; 1995–96	Succeeded by Ruth Perry
