= Francois Massaquoi =

Liberian politician

Hon. Francois Eugene Massaquoi

Minister of Youth and Sports
- In office 1995–2001

Personal details
- Died: 16 April 2001 Gbarnga
- Education: New York University

Francois Eugene Massaquoi (died 16 April 2001) was a Liberian warlord and politician. Massaquoi led the Lofa Defense Force during the First Liberian Civil War, and later became a government minister. He died in 2001 under mysterious circumstances.

== Youth in the US ==
Massaquoi belonged to the Loma people. Arriving in the United States in 1965, he studied economics at New York University. In 1960s the discothèque The Church (later renamed 'Sanctuary' for administrative reasons) opened in Hell's Kitchen in the building that today houses the Westside Theatre, with a concept based on stark irreligious themes created by Massaquoi. Massaquoi and his wife Carolyn ran a food importation business in New York in the 1970s. Back in Liberia he worked as a civil servant during the William Tolbert and Samuel Doe governments.

== Civil war ==
He founded the LDF militia in 1991. During the First Liberian Civil War, Massaquoi's LDF fought against the forces of ULIMO over control of Lofa County.

In December 1994 Massaquoi was one of the signatories of the Accra Clarification Agreement, a peace agreement that was never implemented. Likewise he signed the Abuja I Accord in August 1995, which allowed for the entry of LDF into the government. Massaquoi was named Minister of Youth and Sports in the Liberia National Transitional Government from September 1995 to August 1997. In December 1996 a group of LDF soldiers arrived in Monrovia and physically assaulted Massaquoi, accusing him of not providing support for his former fighters.

During the 1997 Liberian general election Massaquoi belonged to the National Democratic Party of Liberia. After the election he was again named Minister of Youth and Sports.

== Death ==
Massaquoi died on April 16, 2001. Reportedly, during a visit to Voinjama Massaquoi's helicopter came under gunfire. Massaquoi died later at hospital in Gbarnga after arrival there. President Charles Taylor announced the creation of a commission to investigate the circumstances of Massaquoi's death, but the announcement was met with skepticism in Liberia at the time.
