= Vamba Kanneh =

Liberian politician

Vamba M. Kanneh was a Liberian physician and politician.

After the Abuja I Accord in 1995, Kanneh (representing the ULIMO-K faction) was named Minister of Health and Social Welfare in the Liberian National Transitional Government. On February 28, 1997 Kanneh resigned as Minister of Health and Social Welfare to take a seat in the Council of State (5-member collective presidency of the country), as ULIMO-K leader Alhaji G. V. Kromah resigned in order to contest the 1997 Liberian presidential election.

During the Second Liberian Civil War Kanneh joined the LURD rebel group. When LURD joined the National Transitional Government of Liberia in October 2003, Kanneh was named Minister of Transport. As of March 2005 he still held the post.
