= 1994 Liberian coup attempt =

Failed coup d'etat by the Armed Forces of Liberia in 1994

- Part of First Liberian Civil War
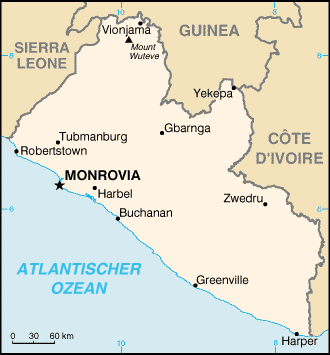
- Map of Liberia
Date	September 15, 1994
Location	Monrovia, Liberia
Result	Failed coup attempt; transitional government retains control

Belligerents
Liberian National Transitional Government; Armed Forces of Liberia; ECOMOG	(Liberia) AFL Dissident faction

Commanders and leaders
(Liberia) David D. Kpormakpor	(Liberia) Charles Julu

Strength
Unknown	100 soldiers

Casualties and losses
- At least 1 civilian

The 1994 Liberian coup attempt was a failed coup d'état in Liberia by dissident elements of the Armed Forces of Liberia (AFL), led by General Charles Julu, against the Liberian National Transitional Government (LNTG), during the First Liberian Civil War. Peacekeeping forces part of the Economic Community of West African States Monitoring Group (ECOMOG) crushed the attempted military overthrow.

The coup attempt was launched on September 15, with some hundred AFL soldiers led by General Charles Julu under the banner of the New Horizon for New Direction seizing control of the administrative Executive Mansion in Monrovia. The dissident forces also attempted to take control of the country's state radio and telecommunications but were later routed by peacekeeping forces. The last holdout of the failed coup, the coastal mansion was continually shelled by peacekeeper gunboats and tanks. A shell fired from one of the gunboats accidentally landed near the local International Committee of the Red Cross (ICRC) office, resulting in a single civilian casualty. After a successful assault on the mansion which saw peacekeeping forces regain control, the coup attempt was at last thwarted.

Following the failed coup d'état, ECOMOG troops detained General Charles Julu along with around eighty others, taking them into their custody. The coup leader was sentenced to life imprisonment for sedition yet was later released in 1996. President Kpormakpor of the transitional government sought to punish the AFL for not intervening to stop the coup despite knowing about it in advance, using his role as Commander-in-Chief to call for the removal of top AFL officials from their posts. Non-compliance by the AFL regarding President Kpormakpor's orders led to further clashes between them and ECOMOG forces.

== Motives ==
During Charles Julu's testimony to the Truth and Reconciliation Commission (TRC) of Liberia, the retired general explained the primary motive to the coup attempt was to prevent a perceived power vacuum from occurring, as the mandate for the transitional government was soon expiring. Thus, he found it necessary to intervene militarily and make sure Liberia didn't suffer from chaos and political instability. Charles Julu also aimed to prevent rebel leader Charles Taylor from seizing power, fearing he would only further destabilize the country. By temporarily occupying the Executive Mansion, he believed he could thwart Taylor's efforts.
