= Gyude Bryant =

Head of state of Liberia from 2003 to 2006

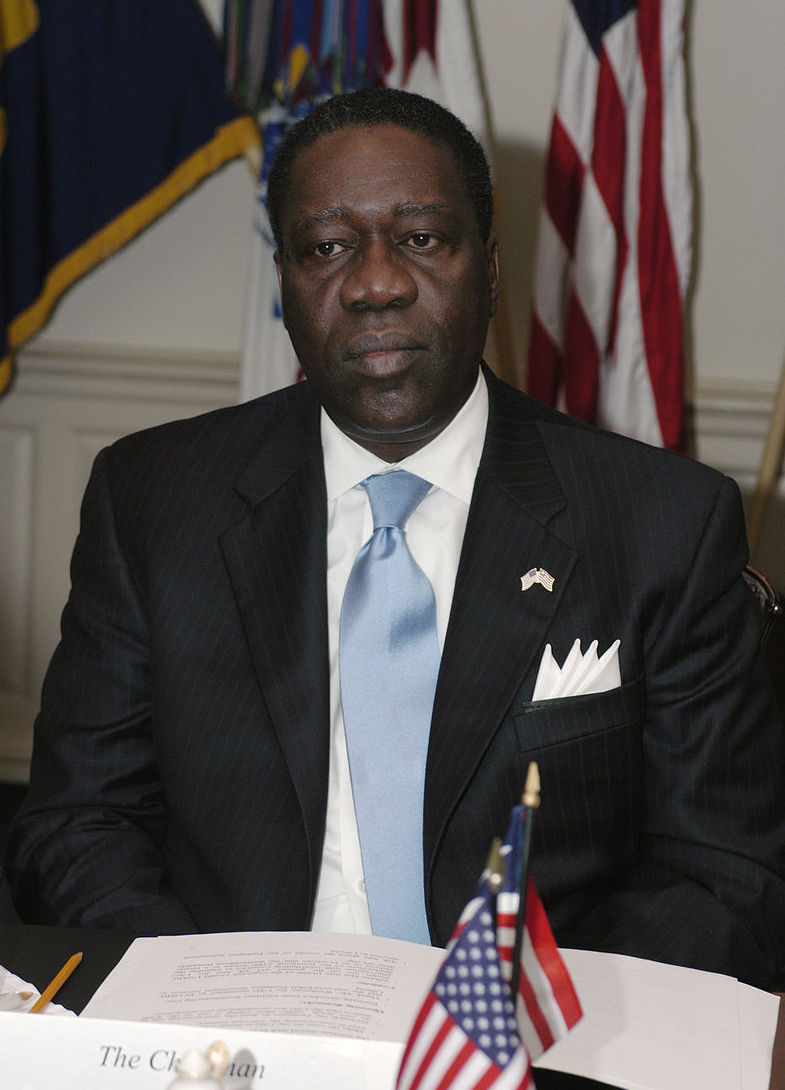
- Bryant in 2004

Chairman of the Transitional Government of Liberia
- In office 14 October 2003 – 16 January 2006
- Deputy: Wesley Momo Johnson
- Preceded by: Moses Blah
- Succeeded by: Ellen Johnson Sirleaf

Personal details
- Born: 17 January 1949 Monrovia, Liberia
- Died: 16 April 2014 (aged 65) Monrovia, Liberia
- Party: Liberian Action Party
- Spouse: Rosie Lee-Bryant

Charles Gyude Bryant (17 January 1949 – 16 April 2014) was a Liberian politician and businessman. He served as the Chairman of the Transitional Government of Liberia from 14 October 2003 to 16 January 2006. The installation of the transitional government was part of the peace agreement to end the country's second civil war, which had raged since the Liberians United for Reconciliation and Democracy (LURD) rebelled against President Charles Taylor in 1999. Bryant was previously a businessman and was chosen as chairman because he was seen as politically neutral and therefore acceptable to each of the warring factions, which included LURD, the Movement for Democracy in Liberia (MODEL), and loyalists of former President Taylor. He was a prominent member of the Episcopal Church of Liberia, and was critical of the governments of both Samuel Doe (1980–90) and Charles Taylor (1997–2003).

Ellen Johnson Sirleaf won the 2005 elections and took office in January 2006, succeeding Bryant.

He died on 16 April 2014 at the John F. Kennedy Medical Center in Monrovia.

== Embezzlement ==
In January 2007, Bryant was questioned by police regarding allegations of corruption during his time in office. On 27 February 2007, Bryant was charged with embezzlement. His government is alleged to have embezzled more than US$1 million. On 12 March a warrant was issued for his arrest. He was not immediately arrested because he was said to be absent from Monrovia and in Lofa County instead, but on 13 March he was arrested and released on bond shortly thereafter. In court on 25 April, the defense argued that Bryant constitutionally enjoyed immunity for actions taken as head of state, while the prosecution argued that he did not because his appointment resulted from the Accra Accords in August 2003 and occurred outside the constitutional framework. On 24 August 2007, the Supreme Court ruled in favor of the prosecution's argument, enabling Bryant's trial to continue.

Bryant was arrested on 7 December 2007 after failing to appear in court earlier in the week. He had said that he was boycotting the court because of his belief that he enjoys immunity. As he was being taken to a prison in Monrovia, he said: "This is a very, very dark day for Liberia. This is the reward we get for restoring peace and democracy to our country." He was released from the central prison in Monrovia on 8 December after he signed a commitment to appear in court on 10 December.

On 30 April 2009, Bryant, along with four others, was acquitted of embezzling US$1 million from the state oil refinery. Additional charges regarding the alleged theft of US$1.3 million from the state were dropped on 24 September 2010 as the government failed to provide any proof of wrongdoing.

== Personal ==
Born in Monrovia during the early years of the Tubman era, Bryant's mother was a descendant of Americo-Liberian settlers and his father was a member of the Grebo people. He matriculated at Cuttington University in 1972, and in 1974 he married the former Rosilee Williams; together they had two children, Cheryl and Charles. Bryant also had a son named Charles Mleh. Before becoming the chairman of the interim government, he was a successful businessman operating a company that supplied machinery for the Freeport of Monrovia, and he was the chairman of the Liberian Action Party, which has since merged with President Sirleaf's Unity Party.

Political offices
Preceded by Moses Blah	Chairman of the Transitional Government of Liberia; 2004–2006	Succeeded by Ellen Johnson Sirleaf
