= Bismarck Kuyon =

Liberian politician

Hon. Bismarck Kuyon

Speaker of the Interim Legislative Assembly
- In office 1991–1994

Member of the House of Representatives from Bong County
- In office 1975–1980

Personal details
- Born: September 15, 1939 Gbarnga, Central Province, Liberia
- Died: February 12, 2014 (aged 74)
- Resting place: Gbarnga
- Education: Cuttington University College; Iowa State University
- Awards: Humane Order of African Redemption

Bismarck Normu Kuyon (September 15, 1939 – February 12, 2014) was a Liberian politician and educator. He was a legislator in the 1970s, and would return to politics during the First Liberian Civil War. In 1993, he was chosen by the warring factions to become the head of the executive of the Liberian National Transitional Government (LNTG), but his nomination was withdrawn before the LNTG was installed.

== Early life and career ==
Kuyon was born on September 15, 1939, in Gbarnga, Liberia. He belonged to the Kpelle people. He attended school in his hometown of Gbarnga. Kuyon obtained a B.Sc. degree in agriculture from the Cuttington University College in Suacoco in 1962. He worked as an agricultural extension agent at the Ministry of Agriculture between 1962–1963. In 1965 he obtained a M.Sc. degree in General Science from Iowa State University in the United States. From 1965–1968 he served as Director of Aquaculture at the Ministry of Agriculture. Between 1968 and 1975, he served as principal of the United Methodist Church school in Gbarnga, the Tubman Elementary and Junior High School. He studied Law through apprenticeship system and was admitted to the Bar in 1971.

== Legislator ==
Kuyon was elected to the House of Representatives in the 1975 Liberian general election from Bong County. In the same year, he was named president and Manager of the Bong County Cooperative. He was a member of the Deshield Commission on National Unity, which was mandated by the legislature to review national symbols (flag, anthem, national motto, constitution) to ensure inclusiveness. In the House of Representatives, he was the chairman of the House Committee on Education.

== 1980s ==
In the 1980s he served as Acting President of the College of West Africa (He would later serve of the Board of Trustees of Cuttington University and the College of West Africa). He worked with the Peace Corps programmes in Liberia in different roles.

== Civil war years ==
In 1990, Kuyon re-entered politics. He became a member of the Interim Legislative Assembly, the parliament linked to the Interim Government of National Unity (IGNU) active during the First Liberian Civil War. He would become of the speaker of the Interim Legislative Assembly. On August 16, 1993, in the wake of the Cotonou Peace Accord, Liberian factions voted Kuyon as the chairman of the Council of State which was to serve as a collective executive branch of the Liberia National Transitional Government (LNTG) until elections could be held. Kuyon was nominated by IGNU, one of the three signatories of the Cotonou Peace Accord. However, Kuyon was removed from the post as Council of State chairman before the LNTG was installed. Kuyon had developed differences with the IGNU President Amos Sawyer over the management of disarmament of the warring factions. On November 13, 1993, he was replaced on the Council of State by Philip A. Z. Banks, III. During the 1997 Liberian general election, he belonged to the Unity Party.

== Later period ==
He was founding chairman of the Bong County Emergency Organization. Active in religious activities, he was Methodist conference lay-leader emeritus. Kuyon received the Humane Order of African Redemption, with the grade of Knight Great Band.

Kuyon died in 2014 and was buried in Gbarnga.
