= Isaac Musa =

Liberian military officer and politician

Hon. Isaac Musa

Vice Chairman of the Council of State
- In office March 1994 – September 1995

Personal details
- Died: 2008; Monrovia, Liberia

Isaac Saye Musa (also spelt Musah, Mussah or Mesahn; died 2008) was a Liberian military official and politician. Musa was one of the top field commanders of National Patriotic Front of Liberia (NPFL) in the First Liberian Civil War. He served in government functions in the transitional governments during the 1990s. A noted loyalist of Charles Taylor, Musa would eventually fall out of favour with Taylor.

== From AFL to NPFL ==
Musa belonged to the Gio people. He was an officer in the Armed Forces of Liberia in the early 1980s, reaching the rank of First Lieutenant of the Military Police. He was detained for a period after the 1985 failed coup d'état attempt, and went into exile after being released. He joined Charles Taylor's NPFL and received guerrilla training in Libya. Musa was part of the NPFL contingent that entered Liberia on December 24, 1989, sparking the outbreak of the First Liberian Civil War. Within the NPFL Musa was named general for the NPFL forces, and acted as Battlegroup Commander at NPFL bases at Roberts International Airport and Kakata. As of 1992 he served as the Joint Chief of Staff for the NPFL.

== In government ==
On October 20, 1993, NPFL named Musa as new vice chair of the Council of State (to become the executive branch of the Liberian National Transitional Government), replacing Dorothy Musuleng-Cooper. The Council of State, with Musa as one of vice chairmen, was installed on March 7, 1994.

Commenting on Musa's entry into the provisional presidency of the country, journalist Gabriel I. H. Williams argued that "[Musuleng-Cooper] was also replaced, as deputy chair of the state council by the NPFL's notorious battle group commander, Isaac Musa [...] Musa, one of the most feared NPFL warriors who prided in calling himself the "Red Devil," happened to be one of the most erratic persons around during the crisis." Musa's arrival to the capital Monrovia was met with tensions from displaced communities from Nimba County. As a Council of State member Musa repeatedly appealed for reconciliation of Nimba County communities. Musa took part in the Akosombo peace negotiations later in 1994. Musa remained in the Council until August 1995 when Taylor overtook the NPFL seat in the Council for himself.

== 1997 elections and Second Civil War ==
After the announcement of the results of the 1997 Liberian general election, Musa stormed the AFL Barclay Training Center barracks, threatening the (predominately Krahn) soldiers with an upcoming purge of AFL personnel from the Ministry of Defense. The ECOMOG peace-keeping force protested against the incident, and (now President-elect) Taylor reprimanded Musa for the action. Musa was detained in Monrovia by Taylor for a period, court-martialed accused of having killed a member of Taylor's Mansion Guard. Musa received legal aid from the Justice and Peace Commission.

Musa was a member of the legislature during the second National Transitional Government of Liberia.

== Death ==
Musa died at the John F. Kennedy Memorial Hospital in 2008. Isaac Musa was listed, along with 22 others, as "Dead Perpetrators" by the Liberian Truth and Reconciliation Commission (LTRC), presented by the Commission as 'perpetrators who the LTRC [determined] were responsible for various forms of human rights abuses [...] and war crimes but died before the conclusion of the LTRC.'
