= Joe Mulbah =

Joseph W. Mulbah (1956–2011) was a Liberian journalist and politician. He served as Minister of Information, Culture and Tourism and Minister of Transport.

== Youth and early journalistic career ==
Mulbah was born in Montserrado County on 26 June 1956. His family hailed from Sobblemah, Bluyeam Clan, Zorzor District, Lofa County. Mulbah graduated from the William V. S. Tubman High School in 1976, and obtained a Bachelor of Arts degree in English and History from the University of Liberia in 1983.

Mulbah started his journalistic career at the Christian radio station ELWA, working on the news program Window on the World. He became the chief news editor of the ELWA radio station. In 1985 he was forced out of his job after pressures from the military junta, after having reported on electoral fraud in the general elections. He came to work for the Daily Observer newspaper as a staff writer. In 1987 he shifted to working as editor for Sports World Newspaper. Mulbah served as secretary general of the Press Union of Liberia in the presidency of Kenneth Y. Best. Mulbah obtained a Master of Arts degree in Journalism from the University of Wales in 1988.

== Civil war years and entry into government ==
During the First Liberian Civil War, Mulbah was among the NPFL-aligned journalists that evacuated to Gbarnga in 1991 as NPFL was expelled from the Monrovia area by ECOMOG, AFL and INPFL. October 1991 he was declared as elected interim president of the Press Union of Liberia by the pro-NPFL journalists gathered in Gbarnga. Mulbah acted as a NPFL spokesperson. In May 1994 he was named Minister of Information in the Liberian National Transitional Government (LNTG), a role he retained until August 1995. He was again named Minister of Information, Culture and Tourism of LNTG in August 1996, and would retain the post in the cabinet of Charles Taylor from August 1996 onwards. In April 2000 President Taylor suspended Mulbah and his Deputy Minister of Information J. Milton Teahjay for a seven-week period after the two had engaged in a fist fight. Whilst Teahjay was later reinstated, Mulbah was not.

In 2001 Mulbah was one of 130 Liberian officials whose name were placed on a UN Security Council travel ban list. Mulbah was named Minister of Transport on February 4, 2002, and served in this role until 2003.

== Later years ==
Mulbah came to hold an associate professor post at the department of mass communication at the University of Liberia, also being the chairman of the department. At the department of mass mommunications he set up the LUX FM radio station. He sat on the board of directors of the Liberia Broadcasting System. As of 2011 Mulbah was the CEO of Sarafina Ventures Company Limited, which owned the channels Love FM and Love TV.

Mulbah died on 11 November 2011, whilst en route to Du-Side Hospital in Margibi County. Vice President of Liberia Joseph Boakai offered condolences to the bereaved family during a visit to Mulbah's Lower Johnsonville residence.
