= Ministry of Justice (Liberia) =

Government ministry of Liberia

Agency overview
- Jurisdiction: Government of the Republic of Liberia
- Headquarters: Monrovia, Liberia
- Minister responsible: N. Oswald Tweh
- Website: https://www.moj.gov.lr/

The Ministry of Justice of Liberia is an organization responsible for providing "effective, efficient and excellent public safety and legal services which promote the rule of law, ensure the safety and security of the public and uphold the interest of the government and people of the Republic of Liberia."

== List of ministers ==
Name	Time of Service
James A.A. Pierre	1971
George Henries	1972-1973
Clarence Lorenzo Simpson, Jr.	1973-1974
Lawrence A. Morgan	1974-1976
Oliver Bright	1976-1979
Joseph F. Chesson	1979-1980
Chea Cheapoo	1980-1981
Isaac Nyeplu	1981-1982
Winston Tubman	1982-1983
Jenkins Scott	1983-1990
Philip A. Z Banks	1990-1994
Laveli Supuwood	1993
Francis Y.S. Garlawolu	1995-1996
Gloria Musu-Scott [1st female]	1996
Peter B. Jallah	1996-1998
Eddington Varmah	1998-2003
Laveli Koboi Johnson	2003
Kabineh J’aneh	2004-2005
Frances J. Allison	2006-2007
Philip A. Z Banks	2007
Christiana Tah	2009-2014
Benedict F. Sannoh	2014-2016
Musa F. Dean	2016-2024
Cllr. N. Oswald Tweh	2024-Present

== See also ==
- Justice ministry
- Politics of Liberia
