= Alfred Kollie =

Liberian politician

Hon. Alfred B. Kollie, Jr.

Minister of Post and Telecommunications
- In office September 1995 – August 1997

Personal details
- Born: 1951
- Died: 2001; Maryland, United States

Alfred Bonogua Kollie, Jr. (1951–2020) was a Liberian politician. Kollie was born November 2, 1951. He hailed from Lofa County.

As of the 1980s, he served as Assistant Minister at the Ministry for Public Works. During a period of the Interim Government of National Unity in the early 1990s Kollie served as Acting Minister for Public Works.

During the First Liberian Civil War Kollie became co-chair of the Liberian Peace Council (LPC). After the Abuja I Accord Kollie was named Minister of Post and Telecommunications in the Liberian National Transitional Government, a role he held between September 1995 and August 1997.

Kollie died on March 5, 2020, at the MedStar Franklin Square Medical Center in Maryland, United States.
