= Dorothy Musuleng-Cooper =

Liberian educator and politician

- Born: Dorothy Harriet Eugenia Cooper; September 9, 1930; Arthington, Liberia
- Died: June 30, 2009 (aged 78); Monrovia, Liberia
- Citizenship: Liberia
- Education: San Francisco State University
- Known for: first female Minister of Foreign Affairs in Liberia

Dorothy Harriet Eugenia Musuleng Cooper (also known as "D-Mus," September 9, 1930 – June 30, 2009) was a Liberian educator, politician and the first woman to serve as Foreign Minister in Liberia. She was born at Arthington, Liberia and obtained her B.S. and M.S. from College of West Africa and San Francisco State University respectively. She worked as a school teacher between graduation and high school and matriculation in 1964 in San Francisco, curriculum development in the Ministry of Education, and principal of Cuttington University College. She was an education minister in Charles Taylor's shadow government from 1990 to 1993 in the National Patriotic Reconstruction Assembly Government.

During 1994, she was appointed the Vice-chairperson of the National Patriotic Front of Liberia, the guerrilla movement of Charles Taylor. In 1994, she was appointed Foreign Minister of Liberia during the period of civil war. In 2001, Taylor's government established a Ministry of Gender and Development (MoGD) and appointed Cooper as the first minister to that position and continued till 2005. She died on June 30, 2009, at the John F. Kennedy Memorial Hospital in Monrovia and was survived by four of her eight biological children.

== Early life ==
Cooper was born in Arthington in Montserrado County to Augustus Washington Cooper Sr. and Irene Anna Flossy Knight. Cooper attended San Francisco State University with a bachelor's and master's degree in Elementary Education. She completed her B.S from College of West Africa in Monrovia and M.S. at San Francisco State College during the 1970s. She worked as a school teacher between graduation and high school and matriculation in 1964 in San Francisco, and later went on to work in curriculum development in the Ministry of Education. She had also previously served as the principal of Cuttington University College.

== Political career ==
She was an education minister in Charles Taylor's shadow government from 1990 to 1993 in the National Patriotic Reconstruction Assembly Government. The National Patriotic Front of Liberia, a rebel group led by Charles Taylor, launched an insurrection in December 1989 against the ruling Doe's government with the backing of neighboring countries such as Burkina Faso and Ivory Coast. This triggered the First Liberian Civil War from 1989 to 1999 that killed 200,000 people. The rebels soon split into various factions, namely IGNU, Ulimo and NPFL. D fighting among each other. A peace deal between warring parties was reached in 1995, leading to Taylor's election as president in 1997. The agreement was signed by Musuleng-Cooper from NPFL front with representatives from another two factions. The takeover by the council was delayed on account of delay in deploying peacekeeping forces. She was chosen as the deputy chairman on August 25, but was replaced by Gen. Isaac Musa on September 22.

During 1994, she was appointed the vice-chairperson of the National Patriotic Front of Liberia, the guerrilla movement of Charles Taylor. In 1994, she was appointed Foreign Minister of Liberia, by the National Patriotic Front of Liberia (NPFL). Cooper was the first woman to hold that position in Liberia. She became the first woman politician to hold the post. She continued in the ministry till 1995. She also filled the last open spot, completing the seating of the Liberian National Transitional Government. During her time as Foreign Minister, she was part of a delegation to attempt to release United Nations hostages in Sierra Leone.

Later, in 2001, Taylor's government established a Ministry of Gender and Development (MoGD) and appointed Cooper as the first minister to that position. She continued with the portfolio till 2003. The interim President Gyude Byrant replaced her with Vabah Gayflor in 2005.

== Later life ==
Cooper had eight children. She died on June 30, 2009, at the John F. Kennedy Memorial Hospital in Monrovia and was survived by four of her biological children. The survivors included Samuel H. Herring Jr., Boehnflahn J. Herring, Alonzo B. Herring, Eva-mae Herring-Christopher, Madia Herring-Mensah, Johnett Herring Hammond, Anie Herring-Freeman, Laurel Herring, Ruel F. Dempster, Byogah J. Herring, Hilton Herring, Amanda Herring, Christopher Herring, Eunice Tubman, Lily Behna, Edwin Borbor, Roland Mitchell, Tonieh Wiles, Benoni Urey, John T. Richardson (Josephine), Belle Roberts, Myrtle Gibson and Eric Kilby. Her funeral was held on 31 July 2009 in Stryker Funeral Home in Monrovia, Liberia.
