= Francis Y.S. Garlawolu =

Liberian politician

National Transitional Legislative Assembly of Liberia
- In office 2003–2006

Senior Senator of Bong County
- In office 1997–?

First Attorney General and Minister of Justice
- In office 1996–1996

Personal details
- Born: Francis Yarkpawolo Garlawolu; 1951 Garlawoluta, Bong, Liberia
- Died: 14 May 2018 (aged 66–67)
- Party: National Patriotic Party
- Spouse: Serena F. Garlawolu
- Education: University of Liberia
- Military career
- Branch: Armed Forces of Liberia
- Rank: Captain

Note: much of this article derives from a hagiographical press-release promoting Garlawolu's presidential candidacy

Francis Y.S. Garlawolu (sometimes spelled "Garlawulo," "Galawolu" or "Galawulo"; 1951 - 14 May 2018) was a Liberian politician and lawyer. He was Attorney General and Minister of Justice in 1996 and both Senior Senator of Bong County and member of the National Transitional Legislative Assembly of Liberia over the next decade.

== Early life ==
Garlawolu was born to Flomo Garlawolu and Towin Var Garlawolu in the small village of Garlawoluta, then Jorquelleh District (now Yeallequellah District), Bong County, Republic of Liberia.

== Career ==
After completing his studies at the University of Liberia in the 1970s, Garlawolu began working as an attorney on human rights cases in Liberia. His focus was on defending poor people, labor unions, and opposition groups. He passed the Bar examination and was admitted to the Supreme Court Bar in 1983. In 1984, he served in the Armed Forces of Liberia as a captain, then was the Deputy Defense Counsel in the People's Redemption Council. He was nominated the following year to represent Bong County in the Senate of Liberia but did not win.

In 1986, as a constitutional lawyer, Garlawolu represented the Grand Coalition, an opposition group made up of the Unity Party, Liberia Unification Party, LAC and United People's Party before the Supreme Court. Upon hearing that the Coalition had scheduled a mass rally at a beach in Monrovia, the Government of Liberia filed a petition for a writ of prohibition against the holding of the rally. The party leaders were arrested and detained. Garlawolu represented them.

Garlawolu founded the Concerned Citizen Movement in 1990 during the First Liberian Civil War and served as its chairman. He attended all the peace conferences from Africa to Europe. These talks led to the formation of a government of National Unity, in which he became the first Attorney General and Minister of Justice in 1996. In 1997, he was elected Senior Senator of Bong County and chaired the Senate Standing Committee on Judiciary and Human Rights. He then became a member of the National Transitional Legislative Assembly following Charles G. Taylor's resignation in 2003 and was subsequently chosen by his colleagues to chair the Judiciary Committee. Garlawolu also served as one of the representatives for Liberia during the formation of the African Union.

In 2003, Garlawolu filed a case on behalf of the Liberian Government against the Government of Sierra Leone before the International Court of Justice. From 2004 until his death in 2018, he led repatriation efforts on behalf of Malachai Z. York, who is currently serving a life sentence in the American prison system. Garlawolu represented ex-president Charles G. Taylor before the Special Court for Sierra Leone. This concerned citizens and other Assembly members, as they thought there was a conflict of interest in Garlawolu being a "sitting lawmaker" while legally defending Taylor, who was being accused of war crimes. Garlawolu also represented Taylor's wife Jewel in divorce proceedings.

In 2005, Garlawolu intended to be a presidential candidate on the ticket of the National Patriotic Party (NPP) and declared that he hoped to win more than 75% of the votes. His name, however, did not appear on the finalized ballot. He accepted a proposal from the U.S.-based company Get Informed International to establish and implement an economic development platform in Liberia. Garlawolu also appointed the company as his official presidential advisor in all economic issues. Get Informed International's officers were involved in the U.S. branch of Garlawolu's election campaign and its CEO and CFO were committee managers in the Nuwaubian Trust Freedom Network, which is working for the release of Malachi Z. York from prison.

Garlawolu was a member of the International Criminal Law Network based in The Hague with the rights of a defense Counsel and was accredited to practice before the International Criminal Court and International Court of Justice. Locally, he was president of the Bong County Bar Association and in 2016 was given a certificate of honor by the Liberian National Bar Association. He also received the Albent Award for the democratization of Liberian society. In addition to working on his criminal case, Garlawolu has collaborated with Malachi York in the past, including as co-founders of the Educational Endowment & Humanitarian Foundation, which has built schools, a clinic, and a church in Bong County.

== Personal life ==
Garlawolu was married to Justice Serena F. Garlawolu. He authored two books: The Liberian Civil War and Efforts for Peace and The Abandoned Child. The latter has been used in ninth grade literature classes in the Liberian School System.
