= Harry Moniba =

Liberian politician

Harry Fumba Moniba (22 October 1937 – 24 November 2004) was a politician from Liberia. He was the 26th vice president of Liberia from 1984 to September 1990, under the banner of the National Democratic Party of Liberia, and ran for president in 1997. He planned to run in the 2005 Liberian presidential election, but died in a two-car accident in Michigan, US on November 24, 2004.

== Early life and education ==
Moniba hailed from the northwestern county of Lofa.

Moniba earned his PhD in International Relations and African Studies at Michigan State University. He received his MSc in secondary education with a minor in Nineteenth Century European Studies at New York University and received his Post master's degree in International Relations and European Studies at State University of New York. His bachelor's degree in Secondary Education (Cum Laude) was earned at Cuttington University College in Liberia.

== Career ==
=== As vice president ===
Moniba served as interim vice president from 1984 to 1985, and as elected vice president from 6 January 1986 to September 1990. While vice president, he was captured by dissident forces in 1985 and, at gunpoint, was told to turn in the resignation of the government on national radio. Refusing to do so, he gave a speech pleading all Liberians to never resort to violence to settle disputes.

In her memoir 'This Child Will Be Great', former president of Liberia Ellen Johnson Sirleaf describes the general election of 1985 as rigged, claiming that the results were 'utterly, utterly false'. Sirleaf ran for senator in the election, winning a seat, but along with others protesting the widespread election fraud, refused to take it.

=== As ambassador ===
Moniba served in the posts of Ambassador Extraordinary and Plenipotentiary of the Republic of Liberia to the Court of St. James and the Sovereign Military Order of Malta. Moniba also held the posts of Assistant Minister of Foreign Affairs, Director of Research at the Ministry of Education in Monrovia, Liberia and First Secretary and Consul to the Embassy of Liberia in Washington, D.C., US, and Ottawa, Canada.

== Awards ==
Moniba received an award from the Liberian Human Rights Chapter in 1994 in honor of his human rights activism. The Chapter stated that along with not supporting any faction in the civil war, "Moniba always valued equality and justice for all and felt as if this was a sign that their fellow Liberian countrymen and women was acknowledging his hard work in his fight against human suffering."

== Death and aftermath ==
Moniba died in a two-car accident in Michigan on November 24, 2004. He was afforded one of the largest state funerals in Liberian history. He left behind his wife, Minita, and their five children. His burial site was contested, with several groups of Liberians threatening violence were he not to be buried in his home county, while others advocated that his burial be on the grounds of the national gravesite. His family decided to place his remains in the compound of their suburban Monrovia home. Two funerals were held in honor of Moniba: one in the United States and one in his home country of Liberia. At the U.S. funeral, Moniba's widow, Minita, was presented by Congressman Nick Smith with the United States flag that had been flown at half-mast over the U.S Capitol, the only Liberian to receive such an honor. The Congressman stated: "Dr. Moniba loved his country, and worked tirelessly to establish peace and prosperity for Liberia. He understood well the true role of a politician in a democratic society." A room was dedicated in Moniba's honor at the Liberian Embassy in Washington, D.C., in February 2007. A primary school in Monrovia was also named in his honor.

== Works ==
About his manuscript, Liberian Politics Today: Some Personal Observations, Moniba stated: "In this work, I attempted to tell my fellow Liberians some problems in national leadership from my vantage point as vice president of Liberia from 1984 to 1990, and how Liberians can avoid future conflicts and dangerous pitfalls of blind partisanship and ethnicity in good governance. I also reviewed the different types of democratic forms of government as seen in the West and their general impact on national development, particularly in third world countries."

In his next book, titled A Vision of the Future, he advised Liberians about what needed to be done in post-war Liberia in order to ensure national unity, political stability in governance, and socio-economic development. He stated: "I further emphasized the need for every Liberian to have a new vision of a Liberia based on social justice, respect for human rights and rule of law. I also admonished my countrymen to remember that what had happened to us during the civil war should be a lesson for everyone to learn from in our arduous task for national reconstruction, democracy and reconciliation."

== Sources ==
- "Dr. Harry F. Moniba Foundation" A Legacy of Public Service Integrity
- "Liberia’s Former Vice President Harry Moniba Is Dead" 26 November 2004
- "Quiet Remembrance of Dr. Harry Fumba Moniba" 21 November 2005

Political offices
Preceded by Bennie Dee Warner	Vice President of Liberia; 1986–1990	Succeeded by Enoch Dogolea
