= Ruth Perry =

Head of state of Liberia from 1996 to 1997

Chairman of the Council of State of Liberia
- In office 3 September 1996 – 2 August 1997
- Deputy: George Boley; G. V. Kromah; Oscar Quiah; Tamba Tailor; Charles Taylor
- Preceded by: Wilton Sankawulo
- Succeeded by: Charles Taylor (as president)

Personal details
- Born: Ruth Sando Fahnbulleh Perry; 16 July 1939 Grand Cape Mount, Liberia
- Died: 8 January 2017 (aged 77) Columbus, Ohio, US
- Party: Unity Party
- Education: University of Liberia

Ruth Sando Fahnbulleh Perry (16 July 1939 – 8 January 2017) was a Liberian politician. She served as the interim Chairman of the Council of State of Liberia from 3 September 1996 until 2 August 1997, following the First Liberian Civil War. After 11 international peace attempts between 1990 and 1995 to end the civil war in Liberia, the attempts appeared to succeed. The interim Council of State consisted of a civilian chairman, as well as members of warring factions: Charles Taylor, United Liberation Movement of Liberia for Democracy-K leader Alhaji Kromah, Liberia Peace Council leader George Boley, and two other civilians.

Perry was known for being the first female president of Liberia and of contemporary Africa as a whole. Liberia also has the distinction of electing Ellen Johnson Sirleaf as the first elected female African leader in modern times.

== Early life ==
Perry was born on 16 July 1939, in a rural area of Grand Cape Mount County, Liberia, the daughter of Marjon and AlHaji Semila Fahnbulleh. She was a Muslim of Vai ethnic ancestry. As a child, Perry participated in the Sande society, a traditional school and secret society for females, and attended regular classes. Her parents later enrolled her in a Roman Catholic school for girls in Monrovia run by missionary nuns. Perry graduated from the Teachers College of the University of Liberia. She worked as an elementary school teacher in Grand Cape Mount County.

She married McDonald Perry, a judge and legislator and they had seven children. After her children were grown, Perry worked in the Monrovia office of Chase Manhattan Bank in 1971, and taught at a Sande school as an elder.

== Political career ==
When her husband was involved in politics, Ruth Perry engaged in the electoral campaign and tried to get women to vote for him. After her husband died, the party asked Ruth to run as senator for their home district. In 1985, Perry won a seat in the Liberian Senate as a Unity Party candidate. In response to Samuel Doe's presidential election after calling elections, Unity Party office-holders and other official opposition politicians boycotted the Senate in protest, asserting that the Doe government was illegitimate. Perry did not join the boycott and became the lone member of the opposition in the Assembly. "You can't solve the problems by staying away," she said. She served until 1989. Afterwards, Perry launched a retail business and became active in civilian groups such as Women Initiative in Liberia, Women in Action for Goodwill and the Association of Social Services that sought an end to the growing Liberian Civil War.

=== Interim Head of State: 1996–97 ===
On 17 August 1996, after 17 years of conflict and 7 years of war, the Economic Community of West African States (ECOWAS) representatives negotiated a cease-fire between Liberia's warring factions and announced that Perry would replace Wilton Sankawulo as Chairman of the Council of State in an interim government. Reportedly all four warlords in the Liberian conflict had agreed to the peace agreement with Perry as interim leader, after her return from a brief exile in Staten Island, New York.

== Later life and death ==
After stepping down, Perry moved between Liberia and the US. In 2004, she was an African President-in-Residence at the African Presidential Archives and Research Center at Boston University. Perry died on 8 January 2017 at the age of 77.

Political offices
Preceded by Wilton Sankawulo	Chairman of the Council of State of Liberia; 1996–1997	Succeeded by Charles Taylor as President of Liberia
