= Agnes Reeves Taylor =

Ex-wife of President of Liberia Charles Taylor

Agnes Reeves Taylor, ex-wife of former Liberian President Charles Taylor, was born on 27 September 1965 in Liberia. On 2 June 2017, she was arrested in London by the Metropolitan Police and charged with torture on the grounds of her suspected involvement with the National Patriotic Front of Liberia (NFPL) rebel group, which was led by her ex-husband, during the First Liberian Civil War, from 1989 to 1996.

== Exile ==
As the second Liberian civil war broke out in 1999, Agnes Reeves Taylor was appointed by Charles Taylor to serve as Permanent Representative of Liberia to the International Maritime Organization, which headquarters in London, from 1999 to 2005.

In 2003 the Security Council Committee established in resolution 1521 a list of Liberian individuals and entities subject to a travel ban and included Agnes Taylor.

In 2007 she was granted asylum in the UK, while she was still on the travel ban list, which was updated to include her location as being in the United Kingdom. She was removed from the travel ban list in 2012.

She settled in the UK, where she worked as a lecturer at the London School of Commerce and Coventry University. Her residence in the UK allowed the UK authorities to arrest and charge her, based on universal jurisdiction laws, with the crimes she allegedly committed in Liberia.

== Charges ==
She was charged with seven counts of torture allegedly committed in Gbarnga, in northern Liberia, and in Gborplay, in north-eastern Liberia. The torture charges were brought under section 134(1) of the UK Criminal Justice Act 1988. She was also charged with one count of conspiracy to commit torture between 23 December 1989 and 1 January 1991, under section 1(1) of the UK Criminal Law Act 1977.

Gbarnga had served as the headquarters of Charles Taylor's NPFL during the first Liberian civil war. A final peace agreement led to the election of Charles Taylor as President of Liberia in 1997.

The eight counts Agnes Reeves Taylor faced concerned events in 1990 as the first civil war raged across Liberia.

· The charge of conspiracy to commit torture related to her alleged facilitation of the rape of captive women by soldiers in Charles Taylor's rebel forces (NPFL)

· Three of the torture charges related to her alleged infliction of "severe pain or suffering", including assaults, on a 13-year-old child soldier.

· She was also allegedly involved in the torture of a “pastor’s wife” who resisted being raped by one of Charles Taylor's commanders. She allegedly "ordered that the woman be tied [in a manner that caused pain amounting to torture]. The defendant then shot and killed the woman's two young children, saying ‘See if you refuse an order this will happen'."

Anges Reeves Taylor denied involvement in any crimes. She was held in pre-trial detention in the UK from 2 June 2017 until her release in 2019.

== Dismissal ==
On 6 December 2019 the Central Criminal Court (The Old Bailey) in London decided to dismiss the charges against Agnes Reeves Taylor. The Court's decision came after the UK Supreme Court confirmed, in a historic judgment on 13 November 2019, that members of non-State armed groups may be prosecuted for crimes of torture under section 134(1) of the UK Criminal Justice Act 1988, thus legally paving the way for the case against Agnes Reeves Taylor to proceed to trial. However, after rendering its judgment, the UK Supreme Court sent the case back to the Central Criminal Court to consider further evidence from the prosecution's expert and apply the legal standard confirmed by the Supreme Court to the facts of the case.

In order for a member of a non-State armed group to be prosecuted for torture, the group must have been exercising “governmental functions”. The Central Criminal Court ruled that the evidence presented by the Crown Prosecution Service (CPS) failed to prove that the NPFL had the requisite authority over the relevant territory at the time the crimes in question were committed. Therefore, the Court dismissed the case. However, in its decision, the Court noted that “there is prima facie evidence that she held a high rank in the NPFL and (…) carried out, whether personally, or by giving orders, or by acquiescing in, the acts of torture (…) which took place in, or on the border of, Nimba County." Thus, Reeves Taylor was not found innocent.

Civitas Maxima and the Monrovia-based Global Justice and Research Project (GJRP) provided the initial information to the UK authorities which led the Metropolitan Police to conduct an investigation into Agnes Reeves Taylor for several years. UK law allows the CPS in these circumstances to return to court if further evidence of government-like control is gathered. It remains to be seen if CPS will do this.

== Her return to Liberia ==
Seven months after the dismissal of her case, Agnes Reeves Taylor returned to Liberia. Although she had claimed asylum in the UK, her application to settle there permanently was refused under a Home Office rule that there were serious reasons to consider that she had, amongst other things, committed a crime against peace, a war crime, or a crime against humanity. Upon her return in Liberia, Agnes Reeves Taylor stated in a press conference on 27 July 2020 that it was “one of the misconceptions that was out there” that she was “looking for asylum” in the UK, and claimed that she “got asylum in the UK in 2007.” In her written press statement issued the same day, she claimed that: “I have returned home to the land of my birth to also contribute to the building of our nation. I am a Liberian with deep love for my country and people. Those of you who know me can attest to this. I am no stranger to many well-meaning Liberians as I was born here, grew up here and went to school and university (The University of Liberia) here”. In her press conference and written press statement, she also accused the organisations and witnesses who assisted the UK authorities with their investigation and prosecution of her of colluding and lying, and taking part in “a grand mischievous and vicious scheme to destroy [her]” in “the hope of financial gain”. She also accused the British Police of arresting her before conducting any investigation: “they arrested me first and began to investigate several months later”.

Agnes Reeves Taylor's return in Liberia provoked a lot of discussion in the press and on social media. A founding member of the National Patriotic Party (NPP), George Mulbah, wrote on his Facebook page: “The National Patriotic Party welcome the founding mother of the party Mrs. Agnes Reeves Taylor to Liberia. <…> Join me to welcome Agnes to Liberia”

== Controversies ==
During the press conference, Agnes Reeves Taylor said some problematic comments regarding human rights defenders, which prompted an immediate reaction from international human rights organisations, including Human Rights Watch, Center for Justice and Accountability, Centre for Civil and Political Rights, Civil Society Human Rights Advocacy Platform of Liberia, Civitas Maxima, Independent Human Rights Investigators, The Advocates for Human Rights, The Global Justice and Research Project who released a joint statement reminding the Government of Liberia of its obligation to protect human rights defenders, and of the United Nations Human Rights Committee's Concluding Observations, issued in 2018. The UN body said that the Government of Liberian should make certain that “all alleged perpetrators of gross human rights violations and war crimes are impartially prosecuted and, if found guilty, convicted and punished in accordance with the gravity of the acts committed.”

The Human Rights Committee's Observations required Liberia to report by 27 July 2020 on the implementation of the recommendations regarding accountability for past crimes. Liberia has not met this deadline.
