= Exotic Tropic Timber Enterprises =

Libyan timber company and arms trader

The Exotic Tropic Timber Enterprises (ETTE) was formed by Fernando Robleda as a logging company in Liberia in February 1997. It later supplied arms to Charles Taylor for his "Operation No Living Thing" in January 1998, in return for concessions, or a license, to harvest the Cavalla Reforestation and Research Plantation in Liberia. The supply of arms was in addition to cash payments made directly to Taylor.

The company had received a license in May 1997 but this was revoked when Taylor came to power. The Ukrainian-Israeli Leonid Minin traveled with Robleda to Liberia to meet with Taylor in September 1998 to set up the deal. Minin became chairman of the board of ETTE on 10 December four days before the company was granted the license.

The UN Security Council listed ETTE as one of three timber companies involved in supplying arms to Charles Taylor, the others being Forum Liberia and the Indonesian-owned Oriental Timber company.
