= Moses Blah =

President of Liberia in 2003

23rd President of Liberia
- In office 11 August 2003 – 14 October 2003
- Vice President: Vacant
- Preceded by: Charles Taylor
- Succeeded by: Gyude Bryant

28th Vice President of Liberia
- In office 24 July 2000 – 11 August 2003
- President: Charles Taylor
- Preceded by: Enoch Dogolea
- Succeeded by: Wesley Momo Johnson

Personal details
- Born: 18 April 1947 Toweh Town, Liberia
- Died: 1 April 2013 (aged 65) Monrovia, Liberia
- Party: National Patriotic

Moses Zeh Blah (18 April 1947 – 1 April 2013) was a Liberian politician. He served as the 28th vice president of Liberia under President Charles Taylor and became the 23rd president of Liberia on 11 August 2003, following Taylor's resignation. He served as president for two months, until 14 October 2003, when a United Nations-backed transitional government, headed by Gyude Bryant, was established.

== Early life and career ==
Blah was born in Toweh Town, Liberia, a Gio-speaking hamlet in north-eastern Nimba County, close to the border with the Ivory Coast. He joined with Taylor because of a shared hatred of President Samuel Doe, who had killed Blah's wife along with hundreds of others in an ethnic-related massacre. He trained with Taylor in a Libyan guerrilla camp and served with him as a general during Liberia's civil war in the 1990s. Blah held the post of ambassador to Libya and Tunisia after Taylor was elected in 1997. In July 2000, he was appointed as Vice President after the death of Enoch Dogolea (who was initially rumored to have been poisoned).

Blah was known as a quiet and unassuming man, driving his own jeep around town rather than using a motorcade and driver. He was often seen wearing flowing African robes instead of the normal suit and tie or olive green military uniform. Blah was also known to be constantly annoyed by the presence of bodyguards following him around.

In June 2003, Taylor had left the country for peace talks in Ghana, and while there he was indicted by the war crimes tribunal in Sierra Leone. Blah was urged by the United States to take power from Taylor during his absence, but made no such attempt. After Taylor's return, Blah was held under house arrest for ten days, but was subsequently absolved and reinstated as vice president.

=== Presidency ===
When Taylor resigned in August 2003, Blah succeeded him as president. He was condemned by Liberian rebel groups for his close ties to Taylor, as they feared that he would simply continue Taylor's practices. Blah responded by calling the rebels "brothers" and saying "Let bygones be bygones. If there is power, we can share it." He invited the rebels to negotiate in his own house. On 14 October 2003, he was succeeded by Gyude Bryant, who served as Chairman of the Transitional Government of Liberia. Having served as president for two months and three days, Blah is the second-shortest serving president in Liberian history behind James Skivring Smith.

=== Post-presidency ===
On 7 April 2008, Blah said that he had been sent a subpoena to testify at Taylor's trial before the Special Court for Sierra Leone in The Hague. He said that he would testify and "speak the truth", and he testified on 14 May 2008, describing child soldiers and the relationship between Taylor and Foday Sankoh. On 1 February 2009, Blah was accused of taking part in the murder of RUF commander Sam Bockarie, by a witness narrative to the commissioners of Liberia’s Truth and Reconciliation Commission (TRC). The witness, a senior commander of the defunct Anti-Terrorist Unit (ATU) of exiled president Charles Taylor, claimed Vice President Blah was part of the conspiracy and participated in the killing of Bockarie in the town of Tiaplay in Nimba County.

== Death ==
Blah died early on 1 April 2013, at age 65, at the John F. Kennedy Hospital in Monrovia.

Political offices
| Preceded by Enoch Dogolea | Vice President of Liberia; 2000–2003 | Succeeded by Wesley Momo Johnson |
| Preceded by Charles Taylor | President of Liberia; 2003 | Succeeded by Gyude Bryant |
