= Enoch Dogolea =

Liberian politician

Enoch Dogolea (1951 – 24 June 2000) was a Liberian politician. He was Charles Taylor's deputy for most of the First Liberian Civil War and then, following Taylor's election as president, served as the country's 27th vice president from 1997 until his death in 2000. He died after falling into a coma in Abidjan, Côte d'Ivoire, where he had been taken a week before due to illness, according to the government. Taylor ordered an autopsy to counter rumors that Dogolea was killed.

Political offices
Preceded by Henry Fumba Moniba	Vice President of Liberia; 1997–2000	Succeeded by Moses Zeh Blah
