= Sacred Heart Cathedral, Monrovia =

Sacred Heart Cathedral
- Sacred Heart Cathedral
- Location: Monrovia
- Country: Liberia
- Denomination: Roman Catholic Church

The Sacred Heart Cathedral or simply Cathedral of Monrovia, is a religious building belonging to the Catholic Church and is located across Broad Street in the heart of the city of Monrovia, capital of the African country of Liberia.

It serves as the headquarters of the Latin Church Metropolitan Archdiocese of Monrovia (Archidioecesis Monroviensis) that was created on December 19, 1981 by Pope John Paul II by the bull Patet Ecclesiae.

== See also ==
- Roman Catholicism in Liberia
- Sacred Heart Cathedral (disambiguation)
