= Arthington, Liberia =

Village in Montserrado County, Liberia

Arthington
- Town
- Location in Liberia
- Coordinates: 6°31′N 10°41′W
- Country: Liberia
- County: Montserrado County
- District: Greater Monrovia
- Time zone: UTC+0 (GMT)

Arthington is a small town in Montserrado County, Liberia, located along the Saint Paul River northeast of the capital city of Monrovia. It is mainly known as the hometown of former President Charles Taylor, the country's 22nd president.

== History ==
The town is named after Robert Arthington, an attorney and philanthropist from Leeds, England who contributed money for former slaves from the Southern United States to emigrate to Liberia and to increase access to Liberia's interior.

Arthington was settled in 1869 by 79 African-American immigrants from Windsor, North Carolina. In 1870, John Roulhac and his party arrived. In 1871, parties led by Jefferson Bracewell and Elias Hill arrived, and in 1872 another group led by Aaron Miller came. These and other immigrants from the U.S. states of North Carolina, South Carolina and Georgia also provided what later came to be known as the Americo-Liberian population of the town.

The town was once known for producing sugarcane, coffee, and ginger, and was the location of one of Liberia's most prosperous trading companies in the late 19th century.

The town's architecture, patterned after plantation homes in the Carolinas, was featured in A Land and Life Remembered: Americo-Liberian Folk Architecture (UGA Press, 1988).
