= Lofa Defense Force =

Rebel Group

- Leader: Francois Massaquoi
- Dates active: 1993–1996
- Active regions: Liberia, Sierra Leone and Guinea
- Size: +750
- Wars: the Liberian Civil War

The Lofa Defense Force (LDF) was a rebel group that participated in the Liberian Civil War.

It was a local group that crossed the northern border from Guinea to attack armed positions, mostly those of the United Liberation Movement of Liberia for Democracy-Kromah faction (ULIMO-K), in early 1994.

The Lofa Defense Force (LDF) was led by Francois Massaquoi and was formed in 1993. Francois Massaquoi was from the Lorma ethnic group. Massaquoi studied economics at New York University. The LDF was estimated to have 750 combatants, mainly drawn from within Lofa County and the Lorma ethnic group. Their mission was to protect their Lorma village from attack from the looting bands of ULIMO's ethnic Mandingo fighters.

Francois Massaquoi died on 16 April 2001 from gunshot wounds after the helicopter he was flying in came under fire in the troubled northern border region of Lofa county.

A government statement said that Francois Massaquoi was taking humanitarian supplies to the northern town of Voinjama, the capital of Lofa near Guinea when his helicopter was fired on as it came to a landing. The helicopter and everyone else in the helicopter escaped, however, Mr. Massaquoi was shot in the helicopter.

Since his death, many Liberians have expressed doubts over the government's version of the story, indicating it is a familiar pattern of mysterious deaths plaguing Liberia. They argued that the government has claimed rebels fighting in northern Liberia (Lofa county in particular) shot and killed Minister Massaquoi and wondered why would an investigation be carried out when it had already labeled rebels as the responsible party. Rebels fighting in Lofa County have claimed responsibility.

"If the Government believes that the Minister was shot in the helicopter and no one else was injured, why is the President naming a commission to investigate? Investigate what? We have not heard from the commission named to probe the death of Vice President Enoch Dogoleah. The Commission of ex-police director Joe Tate, who also died in a plane crash under mysterious conditions, is silent. The killers of Samuel Dokie remain at large. The Government promised to bring the killers of Madam Nowai Flomo to justice but they remain unknown. And now there is a commission of the LDF founder & Sports Minister's death? This is a joke", said an anonymous Methodist priest.
