= Trevor Gordon-Somers =

Jamaican diplomat & economist

Trevor Livingstone Gordon-Somers is a Jamaican diplomat and economist.

In 1965 Gordon-Somers shifted from his post at the Jamaican mission to the United Nations, to the UN Expanded Programme of Technical Assistance (EPTA, forereunner to the United Nations Development Program) office in New York. Later he would hold key positions in the UNDP Regional Bureau for Africa.

On November 20, 1992, Gordon-Somers was named Special Representative of the Secretary-General to Liberia, following United Nations Security Council Resolution 788. His mandate in Liberia ended on December 11, 1994, and he was replaced by Anthony Nyakyi. Gordon-Somers had requested to be relieved from his post following the failed Akosombo Agreement.
