= Oliver Bright Jr. =

Liberian politician

Oliver Bright Jr. was a Liberian politician. He was a lawyer by profession. Bright served as Deputy Minister for Foreign Affairs as of 1971. He was named Minister of Health and Social Welfare on 3 August 1973. He served in that post until 1976 and then as Minister of Justice between 1976 and 1979 in the governments of William Tolbert.

Bright was dismissed from his ministerial post in the wake of the 14 April 1979 rice demonstrations. Reportedly Bright had given the order to police to clear the streets of demonstrators, resulting in clashes with multiple fatalities.
