= Wesley Momo Johnson =

Liberian politician (1944–2021)

Wesley Momo Johnson (27 May 1944 – 9 July 2021) was a Liberian politician. He served as Vice-chairman of the National Transitional Government of Liberia (NTGL) from 14 October 2003 to 16 January 2006.

He was previously the Liberian Ambassador to the United Kingdom and Egypt. He was also the Liberian Ambassador to the Holy see. He studied in Monrovia College and also earned a degree in accountancy from St Francis College and an MBA from Long Island University.

Before entering politics, he was an athlete and he represented Liberia in the 100m and 200m sprints at the 1964 Summer Olympics in Tokyo.

Johnson died on 9 July 2021 in Montserrado County.

Political offices
Preceded by Moses Zeh Blah	Vice-Chairman of the National Transitional Government of Liberia; 2003–2006	Succeeded by Joseph Nyumah Boakai
