= David D. Kpormakpor =

Head of state of Liberia from 1994 to 1995

David Kpormakpor

Chairman of the Council of State of Liberia
- In office 7 March 1994 – 1 September 1995
- Deputy: Mohammed Sherif; Isaac Musa
- Preceded by: Amos Sawyer
- Succeeded by: Wilton Sankawulo

Personal details
- Born: 28 September 1935 Bomi County, Liberia
- Died: 19 August 2010 (aged 74) New York City, United States

David Donald Kpormakpor (28 September 1935 – 19 August 2010) was a Liberian politician and the first chairman of the Council of State that ruled Liberia from 7 March 1994 until 1 September 1995 during the height of the First Liberian Civil War.

== Early life ==
Born in Bomi County, Kpormakpor graduated from the Louis Arthur Grimes School of Law of the University of Liberia. He later served as an associate justice on the Supreme Court of Liberia.

== Political career ==
During the civil war, Kpormakpor was chosen as the civilian chair of the Council of State, which also included members representing warring factions in an attempt to end the war. Following a year of political stalemate, Kpormakpor and the Council of State disbanded and were succeeded by another council headed by Wilton Sankawulo.

== Later life ==
Kpormakpor later moved to the United States, residing on Staten Island. He died in New York City in 2010. A high-level Liberian Government delegation, headed Cllr. Philip A. Z. Banks, II, chairman of the Law Reform Commission and former minister of the Ministry of Justice, attended the funeral of the Honorable David D. Kpormakpor, former chairman of the Liberia National Transitional Government (LNTG) in the United States of America.

Preceded by Dr. Amos Sawyer	Chairman of the Council of State of Liberia; 1994–1995	Succeeded by Wilton G. S. Sankawulo
