= Tamba Taylor =

Liberian politician (1898–2000)

Tamba Taylor, also spelled "Tailor," (September 1898 – October 2000) was a long-serving paramount chief of the Kissi people, Lofa County, Liberia. Taylor served as deputy chairman, along with several other former warlords, of the Council of State at the end of the First Liberian Civil War for 1995 to 1997.

Taylor was born on 29 September, 1898, in a Kissi family in Milimalah, Kissi Chiefdom (in present-day Foya District). His name was Tamba Lamie Kongor. He received no formal education. He later changed his name to 'Taylor', due to his profession as a tailor. He would later claim to have sewn clothes for Ethiopian emperor Haile Selassie and Ghanaian President Kwame Nkrumah.

Taylor became paramount chief in 1957. He served on various national commissions, most notably the National Unification Programme Taylor of President William Tubman. Taylor became popularly known as 'the millionaire of Lofa'. He was rumoured to have had dozens of wives and would have fathered some 200 children.

During Samuel Doe's period as leader of the People's Redemption Council ruling Liberia in the 1980s, Doe sought Taylor's support for the junta government but Taylor did not heed the call.

During the First Liberian Civil War, following the creation of the Liberian National Transitional Government, Taylor's name was proposed as a potential chairman of the Council of State (a provisional collective Presidency) by National Patriotic Front of Liberia leader Charles Taylor (no relation to Tamba Taylor). The 21 December 1994, Accra Agreements outlined that Tamba Taylor would chair a new Council of State, but the Accra Agreements were never implemented. Tamba Taylor became one of six members of the Council of State chaired by Wilton G. S. Sankawulo and installed on 1 September 1995. When the Council of State was restructured after the 1996 Abuja Accords, Tamba Taylor retained his seat on the council. However, Tamba Taylor's participation on the Council of State was largely symbolic; in practice he was often excluded from proceedings or unable to follow the conversations due to language barriers.

Taylor died in October 2000. He was succeeded as paramount chief by his son Momo S. Taylor. A community hall in Foya District, the Tamba Lamie Taylor Council, is named after Taylor.
