= Oscar Quiah =

Liberian politician (died 2021)

Oscar Jaryee Quiah (died 30 January 2021) was a Liberian politician.

Quiah hailed from a Sapo family in Sinoe County. Quiah was a founding member of the Progressive Alliance of Liberia (PAL). Quiah was among the arrested in the 14 April 1979 rice riots. He was detained at the Monrovia Central Prison and was charged with treason. He was one of the founders of the Progressive People's Party (PPP) and served as its secretary general, and remained with party as it was converted into the United People's Party (UPP). Quiah was named Minister of Local Government, Urban Reconstruction and Rural Development in the government of the People's Redemption Council of Samuel K. Doe 1980-1981. In 1981 Quiah was accused of participating in a plot led by Major-General Thomas Weh Syen against Doe. He was removed from his ministerial post and arrested.

He later split from UPP and joined Doe's National Democratic Party of Liberia (NDPL). He served as the secretary general of the NDPL. Quiah served as director-general of the Civil Service Authority 1985-1986. Quiah headed the National Housing Authority. He served as Minister of Post and Telecommunications, before being removed from the post by President Doe in 1987.

Quiah became a member of the Council of State (the collective presidency of the Liberian National Transitional Government) installed on 1 September 1995. He represented the Liberian National Conference, a coalition of civil society organizations, in the Council of State. At the time he was considered close to the 'Coalition Forces'. During the April-May 1996 clashes in Monrovia, Quiah suffered a stroke and was evacuated to Accra for treatment. When the Council of State was restructured later in 1996 under the chairmanship of Ruth Perry, Quiah retained his seat on the Council.

Quiah died at ELWA Hospital on 30 January 2021. He had been ill for months. President George Weah sent condoleances to Quiah's family following the announcement of his death.
