= Liberia Peace Council =

- Leader: George Boley Ted W.B Quiah
- Dates active: 1993-1996
- Active regions: Throughout Liberia, especially in the southeast
- Size: 2,500?
- Wars: the Liberian Civil War

The Liberia Peace Council (LPC) was a rebel group that participated in the Liberian Civil War under the leadership of George Boley.

The LPC emerged in 1993, partly as a proxy force for the Armed Forces of Liberia (AFL). It made substantial gains against the National Patriotic Front of Liberia (NPFL) in southeastern Liberia, vying for control of commercial operations in timber and rubber.

A predominantly ethnic Krahn organization, it drew supporters from the United Liberation Movement of Liberia for Democracy (ULIMO) and the AFL, but also from other ethnic groups who suffered under NPFL occupation.

It had about 2,500 militants in its ranks.

The LPC committed serious human rights abuses including murder, torture, and looting in an effort to terrorize and depopulate rural areas held by the NPFL.
