= 1997 Liberian general election =

- 19 July 1997
- Presidential election
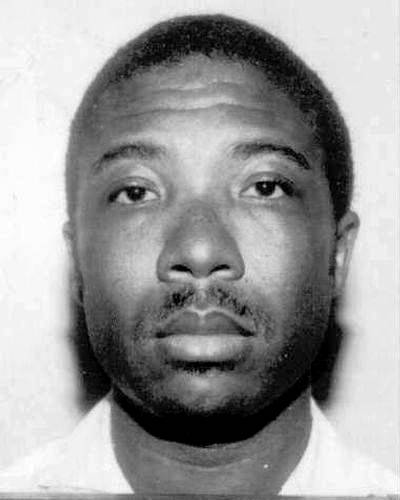

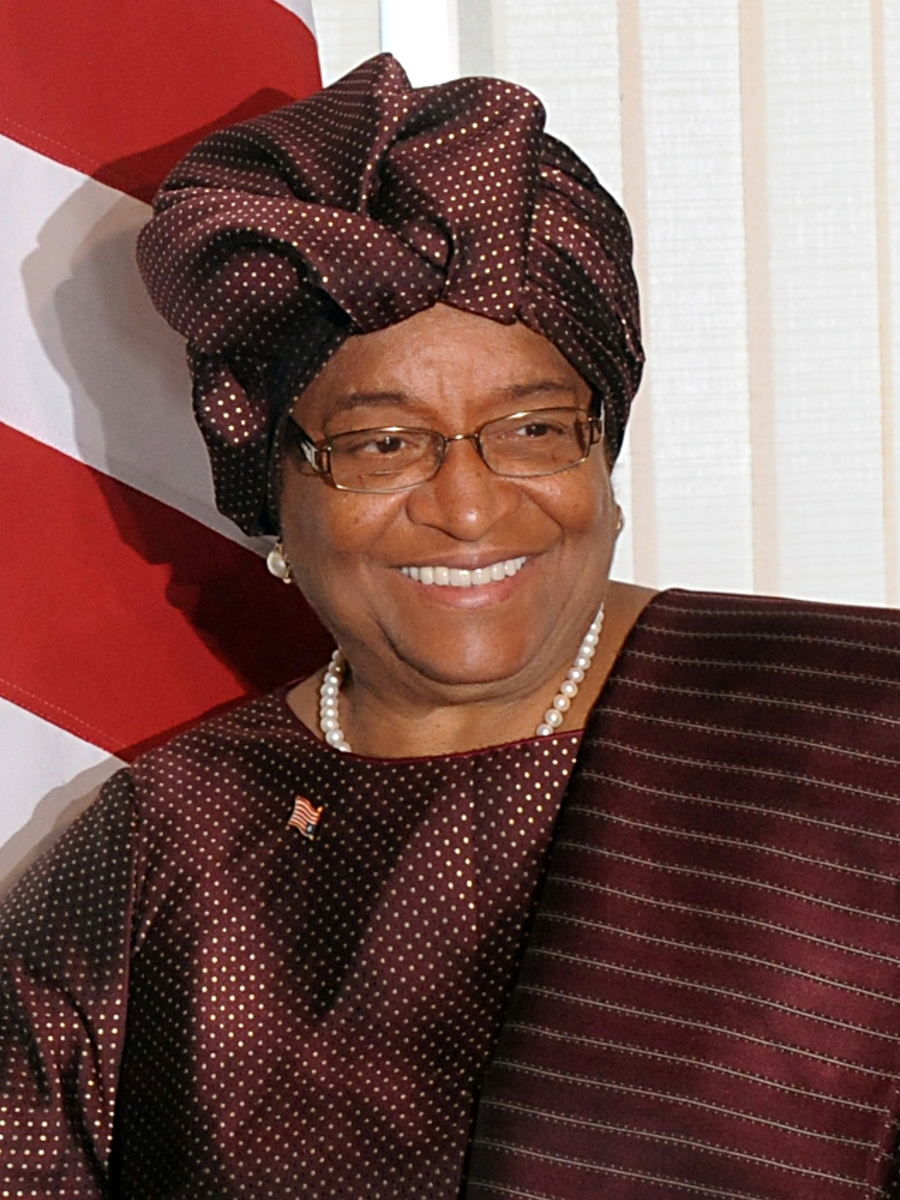
Nominee	Charles Taylor	Ellen Johnson Sirleaf
Party	NPP	UP
Popular vote	468,443	59,557
Percentage	75.33%	9.58%
- Results by county
President before election
Ruth Perry
Independent
Elected President
Charles Taylor
NPP

General elections were held in Liberia on 19 July 1997 as part of the 1996 peace agreement ending the First Liberian Civil War. The presidency, as well as all seats in the House of Representatives and the Senate were up for election. Voter turnout was around 89%. Former rebel leader Charles Taylor and his National Patriotic Party (NPP) won the election with 75.3% of the vote, giving it about three-quarters of the legislative seats according to the proportional representation system. Taylor was inaugurated as president on 2 August 1997.

Taylor campaigned on, among other slogans, "He killed my ma, he killed my pa, but I will vote for him." The elections were overseen by the United Nations' peacekeeping mission, United Nations Observer Mission in Liberia, along with a contingent from the Economic Community of West African States. Taylor's closest competitor, Ellen Johnson Sirleaf, collected only 10 percent of the vote.

== Background ==
During 1984 a new draft constitution was approved in a referendum, which allowed a 58-member civilian and military combined Interim National Assembly, headed by President Samuel Doe. The ban on political parties was lifted and the nation went for elections in 1985. The election results were announced on 29 October, with NDPL leading both in the presidential, Assembly and Senate. Doe was sworn in as the president on 6 January and a civilian cabinet on 15 January. The period after the elections saw increased human rights abuses, corruption, and ethnic tensions, ultimately leading to the start of the First Liberian Civil War in 1989 and Doe's overthrow and murder in 1990.

During the civil war between 1990 and 1997, 200,000 people died, accounting for roughly 10 per cent of pre-war population; one-third were left as refugees and most of the population had migrated at some point. The Economic Community of West African States (ECOWAS) lead initiatives to bring peace to the nation and an ECOWAS Cease fire monitoring committee was overseeing the agreements. National Patriotic Front of Liberia leader, Charles Taylor was leading the war. There were various treaties signed to bring peace to Liberia, namely, the Cotonou Accord on 25 July 1993, the Akosombo Agreement on 12 August 1994, and its Accra Clarification. Abuja Agreement, one of the last thirteen peace agreement was signed during 19 August 1995 in Nigeria. Taylor agreed to dissolve NPFL and form a civil party later, which went on to be the National Patriotic Party.

On 14 February 1997, it was announced that elections would be held on 30 May 1997, but a postponement was needed with the elections eventually scheduled for 19 July.

== Electoral system ==
The Legislature of Liberia was modeled based on the Legislature of United States. It was bicameral, with a Senate and the House of Representatives. There are 13 counties in the country and based on the population, each county is defined to have at least two members, while the total number of members to the house including the Speaker being 64. Each member represents an electoral district and elected to a six-year term based on popular vote. There were 26 senators, two each for the 13 counties and they serve a nine-year term (30 senators, 15 counties and nine years from 2011). Senators are also elected based on plurality of votes. The vice-president is the head of the Senate and he also acts as president in his absence.

To be eligible as a voter, one had to be 18 years of age and registered on electoral rolls. Persons who were of foreign origin, "insane", or convicted in crime were not eligible. The eligibility criteria to be candidate of a political party in the House of Representatives were residence in the country for one year before the elections, and being a taxpayer 25 years of age. The eligibility criteria to be candidate of a political party in the Senate were residence in the country for one year continuously before the elections, and being a taxpayer 30 years of age.

== Conduct ==
The Election Commission faced challenges in educating the public about the voting, and secrecy of voting. An estimated 70 to 90 percent of the population were illiterate, making it even more difficult to educate them. Also, the True Whig Party's historical dominance had not allowed a pluralistic political culture. The logistical challenges were worsened by the agreement for immediate elections, as most Liberian infrastructure was lost in the civil war. The elections were overseen by the United Nations' peacekeeping mission, United Nations Observer Mission in Liberia, along with a contingent from the Economic Community of West African States.

== Results ==
The final results were announced in August, which gave an overwhelming majority to NPP both in the House and Senate. Taylor won the election in a landslide, garnering 75 percent of the vote. Taylor's closest competitor, Ellen Johnson Sirleaf, collected only 10 percent of the vote. Nyudueh Morkonmana was elected Speaker of the House of Representatives, and Taylor was sworn in as the president of Liberia on 3 August and his cabinet was announced in the following weeks.

Party	Presidential candidate	Votes	%	Seats	
Party	Presidential candidate	Votes	%	House	Senate
National Patriotic Party	Charles Taylor	468,443	75.33	49	21
Unity Party	Ellen Johnson Sirleaf	59,557	9.58	7	3
All Liberia Coalition Party	Alhaji G.V. Kromah	25,059	4.03	3	2
Alliance of Political Parties (LAP–LUP)	Cletus Wotorson	15,969	2.57	2	0
United People's Party	Gabriel Baccus Matthews	15,604	2.51	2	0
Liberian People's Party	Togba-Nah Tipoteh	10,010	1.61	1	0
National Democratic Party	George Boley	7,843	1.26	0	0
Liberia National Union	Harry Moniba	6,708	1.08	0	0
People's Democratic Party	George T. Washington	3,497	0.56	0	0
National Reformation Party	Martin Sheriff	2,965	0.48	0	0
Progressive People's Party	Chea Cheapoo	2,142	0.34	0	0
Reformation Alliance Party	Henry Fahnbulleh	2,067	0.33	0	0
Free Democratic Party	Fayah Gbollie	2,016	0.32	0	0
Total		621,880	100.00	64	26
Registered voters/turnout		751,430	–		
Source: African Elections Database

== See also ==
- History of Liberia
- First Liberian Civil War
