= George Boley =

Liberian politician and former warlord

George Eutychianus Saigbe Boley
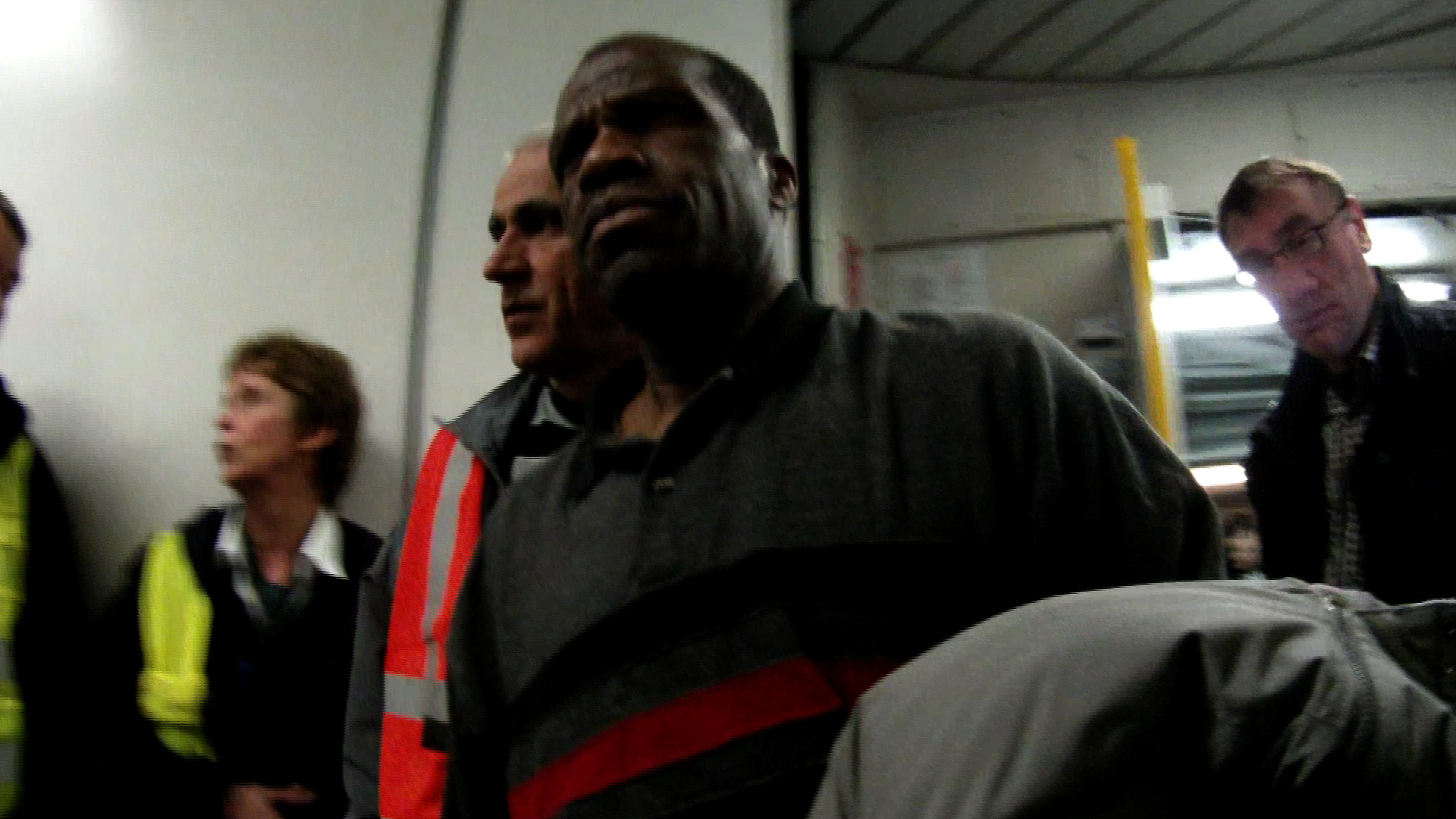
- Boley in U.S. custody; he became the first person removed under the Child Soldiers Accountability Act.

Member of the House of Representatives of Liberia
- In office 2018–2024
- Preceded by: Alphonso Gaye
- Succeeded by: Marie G. Johnson
- Constituency: Grand Gedeh-2

Minister of Education
- President: Samuel Doe

Minister of Presidential Affairs
- President: Samuel Doe

Personal details
- Born: December 7, 1949 (age 76) Grand Gedeh County, Liberia
- Party: United People's Party

George Eutychianus Saigbe Boley (born 7 December 1949) is a Liberian politician and former warlord. He is a member of the Krahn ethnic group.

Boley served in the government of President William R. Tolbert Jr. and later held cabinet positions under President Samuel Doe. During the First Liberian Civil War, he became the leader of the Liberia Peace Council (LPC), a militia faction accused by human rights organizations of committing abuses during the conflict.

== Early career ==
Boley served in a junior ministerial role in the administration of President William R. Tolbert Jr.. He was briefly jailed for alleged connections with opposition groups but was released following the military coup of April 1980 that brought Samuel Doe to power.

Under Doe, Boley later served as Minister of Presidential Affairs and as Minister of Education.

== Civil war ==
After the assassination of Samuel Doe in September 1990 during the First Liberian Civil War, Boley went into exile in the United States. He later returned to Liberia and became the leader of the Liberia Peace Council (LPC), a militia faction active during the civil war.

Human rights organizations accused the LPC of committing widespread abuses during the conflict, including killings, forced displacement, and the recruitment of child soldiers. The Truth and Reconciliation Commission of Liberia later identified Boley as a key leader of the LPC militia and recommended that he be investigated for alleged wartime abuses.

== Political career ==
Boley ran for president in the 1997 Liberian general election. Representing the National Democratic Party of Liberia (NDPL), he received 1.26% of the vote.

In 2010, Boley was detained in the United States on immigration-related charges. In February 2012 he was deported to Liberia by U.S. Immigration and Customs Enforcement after U.S. authorities determined that he had committed human rights abuses during the Liberian civil war. His deportation marked the first removal carried out under the United States Child Soldiers Accountability Act.

In the 2017 Liberian general election, Boley was elected to the House of Representatives of Liberia. He represented Grand Gedeh County's 2nd electoral district on the ticket of the United People's Party.

Boley ran for re-election in the 2023 Liberian general election as a candidate of the Liberia Rebuilding Party but was defeated by Marie G. Johnson.
