= G. V. Kromah =

Liberian politician (1953–2022)

Alhaji Garxim Varmuyan Kromah (11 February 1953 – 18 January 2022) was a Liberian journalist and later warlord and leader of the ULIMO faction during the First Liberian Civil War. He was a Muslim and member of the Mandingo ethnic group from Tusu Town, Quardu Gboni District, Lofa County. He attended St. Patrick's High School (1973).

Kromah earned a B.A. from the University of Liberia in 1977. In 1982, he graduated with an M.A. in communications (journalism and public affairs) from American University in Washington, D.C.

Kromah was a special assistant to the vice president and later assistant information minister during the regime of President William Tolbert before becoming director general of the Liberian Broadcasting System in 1982 and minister of information in 1984 under President Samuel Doe. Kromah denied the government's crackdown leading to some deaths at the University of Liberia in 1984, and went into exile in June 1990, months after the First Liberian Civil War began. He later co-founded the United Liberation Movement of Liberia for Democracy (ULIMO) a resistance armed group that forced Charles Taylor to a negotiating table that eventually brought tangible political solution to the Liberian conflict.

ULIMO split into two factions in 1994, with Kromah leading one faction known as ULIMO-K. Its power base was in northwestern Liberia, in and around Lofa County.

After the war ended, Kromah contested the 19 July 1997 presidential election representing the All Liberia Coalition Party, placing third with 4.02% of the vote.

Kromah ran again as the party's presidential candidate in the 11 October 2005 elections in which he was again defeated, receiving 2.8% of the vote.
