= Charles Taylor (Liberian politician) =

President of Liberia from 1997 to 2003

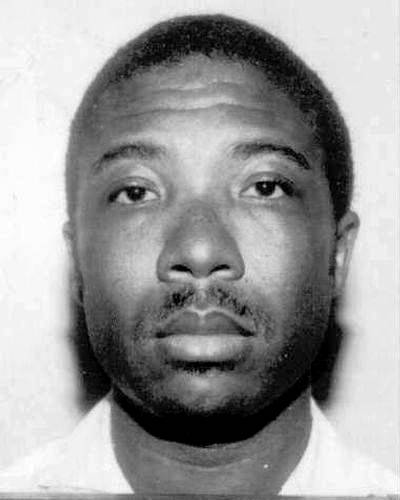
- Taylor's 1984 mugshot for embezzlement charges

22nd President of Liberia
- In office 2 August 1997 (Note: Officially sworn in on 3 August 1997.) – 11 August 2003
- Vice President: Enoch Dogolea; Moses Blah
- Preceded by: Ruth Perry (as Chairwoman of the Council of State)
- Succeeded by: Moses Blah

Deputy Chairman of the Council of State
- In office 1 September 1995 (Note: At the beginning of September 1995, Liberia's three principal warlords – Taylor, George Boley and Alhaji Kromah – made theatrical entrances into Monrovia. A ruling council of six members under civilian Wilton G. S. Sankawulo and with the three factional heads Taylor, Kromah and Boley, took control of Liberia, in preparation for elections that were originally scheduled for 1996.) – 2 August 1997 Serving with George Boley; G. V. Kromah; Oscar Quiah; Tamba Tailor
- Preceded by: Mohammed Sherif and Isaac Musa
- Succeeded by: Enoch Dogolea (as Vice President of Liberia)

Personal details
- Born: Charles McArthur Taylor; 28 January 1948 (age 78) Arthington, Liberia
- Party: National Patriotic (1997–2005)
- Other political affiliations: People's Redemption Council (expelled in 1983)
- Spouses: Enid Tupee (m. 1979; div. 1997); Jewel Howard (m. 1997; div. 2006); Victoria Addison (m. 2012)
- Domestic partner: Bernice Emmanuel (1977–1979)
- Children: 14 biological (including Charles and Philip), 2 adopted
- Education: Bentley University

Military service
- Allegiance: Greater Liberia (1989–1997); Republic of Liberia (1995–2002)
- Years of service: 1989–2002
- Rank: Commander
- Commands: Liberian Army
- Battles/wars: First Liberian Civil War; Sierra Leone Civil War; Second Liberian Civil War
- Criminal conviction
- Criminal information
- Years active: 1997–2003
- Convictions: Crimes against humanity including acts of terrorism, murder, atrocities against personal dignity, rape, slavery, mutilation, use of children under the age of 15 in armed forces or groups, or using them to actively participate in hostilities, looting and other inhumane acts
- Penalty: 50 years in prison

Details
- Victims: Over 100,000
- Date apprehended: 29 March 2006
- Imprisoned at: HM Prison Frankland

Charles McArthur Ghankay Taylor (born 28 January 1948) is a Liberian former politician. He served as the 22nd president of Liberia from 2 August 1997 until his resignation on 11 August 2003 as a result of the Second Liberian Civil War and growing international pressure. After leaving office, he was found guilty of war crimes committed in the Sierra Leone Civil War, and was sentenced to 50 years in prison.

Born in Arthington, Montserrado County, Liberia, Taylor earned an economics degree at Bentley College in the United States before returning to Liberia to work in the government of Samuel Doe. After being removed for embezzlement and imprisoned by President Doe, Taylor escaped prison in 1985. He eventually arrived in Libya, where he was trained as a guerrilla fighter. He returned to Liberia in 1989 as the head of a Libyan-backed rebel group, the National Patriotic Front of Liberia, to overthrow the Doe government, initiating the First Liberian Civil War (1989–1996). Following Doe's execution, Taylor gained control of a large portion of the country and became one of the most prominent warlords in Africa. His forces, along with those of other rival warlords such as ULIMO, were notorious for committing widespread human rights abuses and atrocities during the civil war. Following a peace deal that ended the war, Taylor was elected president in the 1997 general election as a member of the National Patriotic Party (NPP).

During his term in office, Taylor was accused of war crimes and crimes against humanity as a result of his support for the Revolutionary United Front (RUF) rebel group in the Sierra Leone Civil War (1991–2002). Domestically, Taylor attempted to consolidate power through dictatorial means such as by purging the military and committing violence against his political rivals, including an assassination attempt of former ULIMO commander Roosevelt Johnson, leading to violent clashes in Monrovia in 1998. As a result, opposition to his government grew, culminating in the outbreak of the Second Liberian Civil War in 1999. By 2003, Taylor had lost control of much of the countryside and was formally indicted by the Special Court for Sierra Leone. That year, he resigned as a result of growing international pressure and went into exile in Nigeria. In 2006, the newly elected president of Liberia, Ellen Johnson Sirleaf, formally requested his extradition. He was detained by UN authorities in Sierra Leone and then at the Penitentiary Institution Haaglanden in The Hague, awaiting trial by the Special Court. He was found guilty in April 2012 of all eleven charges levied by the Special Court, including terror, murder, and rape.

In May 2012, Taylor was sentenced to 50 years in prison. Reading the sentencing statement, presiding Judge Richard Lussick said: "The accused has been found responsible for aiding and abetting as well as planning some of the most heinous and brutal crimes in recorded human history."

== Early life ==
Taylor was born in Arthington, a town near the capital of Monrovia, Liberia, on 28 January 1948, to Neilson Philip Taylor, an Americo-Liberian, and Yassa Zoe Louise Taylor, a Gola adoptee. His mother Yassa had been taken in by Taylor's grandparents as a domestic servant before becoming romantically involved with his father Neilson later in adulthood. Due to the family's prejudice toward indigenous Liberians, Yassa's first pregnancy, and their marriage that followed, further divided Neilson's family, and Charles, their third-born child, was given to an elderly Americo-Liberian family as a baby to afford him more opportunities. He took the name "Ghankay," possibly to please and gain favor with indigenous Liberians early in his political career. His father, who reportedly worked as a Baptist school teacher, sharecropper, lawyer, and judge at different times, was the grandson of an African-American carpenter named Jefferson Bracewell who lived in Valdosta, Georgia, before emigrating to Liberia with his family in December 1871 aboard the ship Edith Rose. The Bracewells were one of the founding families of Arthington and cultivated coffee, cotton, sugarcanes, potatoes, and rice while the women tanned leather, assembled clothing, and weaved their own fabric.

In 1977, Taylor earned a degree at Bentley College in Waltham, Massachusetts, United States.

== Government, imprisonment and escape ==
Taylor supported the 1980 Liberian coup d'état led by Samuel Doe, which resulted in the murder of President William Tolbert and seizure of power by Doe, who established the People's Redemption Council. Taylor was appointed to the position of Director General of the General Services Agency (GSA), a position that left him in charge of purchasing for the Liberian government. He was fired in May 1983 for embezzling an estimated $1 million (~$2.71 million in 2025) and sending the funds to another bank account.

Taylor fled to the United States but was arrested on 21 May 1984 by two US Deputy Marshals in Somerville, Massachusetts, on a warrant for extradition to face embezzlement charges. Taylor fought extradition with the help of a legal team led by former US Attorney General Ramsey Clark. His lawyers' primary arguments were that his alleged acts of lawbreaking in Liberia were political rather than criminal in nature and that the extradition treaty between the two republics had lapsed. Assistant United States Attorney Richard G. Stearns argued that Liberia wished to charge Taylor with theft in office, rather than with political crimes. Stearns' arguments were reinforced by Liberian Justice Minister Jenkins Scott, who flew to the United States to testify at the proceedings. Taylor was detained in the Plymouth County Correctional Facility.

On 15 September 1985, Taylor and four other inmates escaped from the jail. Two days later, The Boston Globe reported that they sawed through a bar covering a window in a dormitory room, after which they lowered themselves 20 feet (6.1 m) on knotted sheets and escaped into nearby woods by climbing a fence. Shortly thereafter, Taylor and two other escapees were met at nearby Jordan Hospital by Taylor's wife, Enid, and Taylor's sister-in-law, Lucia Holmes Toweh. They drove a getaway car to Staten Island in New York, where Taylor disappeared. All four of Taylor's fellow escapees, as well as Enid and Toweh, were later apprehended.

In July 2009, Taylor claimed at his trial that US CIA agents had helped him escape. The US Defense Intelligence Agency confirmed that Taylor first started working with US intelligence in the 1980s but refused to give details of his role or US actions, citing national security.

=== Civil war ===
Taylor escaped the United States without issue. He then resurfaced in Libya where he took part in militia training under Muammar Gaddafi, becoming Gaddafi's protégé. He later left Libya and travelled to the Ivory Coast, where he founded the National Patriotic Front of Liberia (NPFL).

In December 1989, Taylor launched a Gaddafi-funded armed uprising from the Ivory Coast into Liberia to overthrow the Doe regime, leading to the First Liberian Civil War. By 1990, his forces controlled most of the country. That same year, Prince Johnson, a senior commander of Taylor's NPFL, broke away and formed the Independent National Patriotic Front of Liberia (INPFL).

In September 1990, Johnson captured Monrovia, depriving Taylor of outright victory. Johnson and his forces captured and tortured Doe to death, instigating a violent political fragmentation of the country. The civil war turned into an ethnic conflict, with seven factions among indigenous peoples and the Americo-Liberians fighting for control of Liberia's resources (especially iron ore, diamonds, timber, and rubber).

Journalist Amos Sawyer alleges that Taylor's aims extended beyond Liberia—that he wanted to re-establish the country as a regional power player. Taylor's ambitions, which were held from the civil war period into his presidency, not only resulted in the domestic Liberian conflict, they also triggered regional instability which manifested itself in the forms of the Sierra Leone Civil War and unrest in the forest region of Guinea.

== Presidency ==
After the official end of the civil war in 1996, Taylor ran for president in the 1997 general election. He campaigned on the notorious slogan "He killed my ma, he killed my pa, but I will vote for him."

The elections were overseen by the United Nations' peacekeeping mission, United Nations Observer Mission in Liberia, along with a contingent from the Economic Community of West African States. Taylor won the election in a landslide, garnering 75 percent of the vote. Although the election was generally regarded as free and fair by international observers, Taylor had a significant advantage from the outset. During the civil war, he seized virtually all of the country's radio stations and used his control over the Liberian airwaves to spread propaganda and bolster his image. Additionally, there was widespread fear in the country that Taylor would resume the war if he lost.

During his time in office, Taylor cut the size of the Armed Forces of Liberia, dismissing 2,400–2,600 former personnel, many of whom were ethnic Krahn brought in by former President Doe to give advantage to his people. In 1998, Taylor attempted to murder one of his political opponents, the former warlord Roosevelt Johnson, causing clashes in Monrovia, during and after which hundreds of Krahn were massacred and hundreds more fled Liberia. This event was one of the factors that led to the outbreak of the Second Liberian Civil War.

In 2003, members of the Krahn tribe founded a rebel group, the Movement for Democracy in Liberia (MODEL), opposing Taylor. The group disbanded as part of the peace agreement at the end of the second civil war. In its place, Taylor installed the Anti-Terrorist Unit, the Special Operations Division of the Liberian National Police (LNP), which he used as his private army.

During his presidency, Taylor was alleged to have been involved directly in the Sierra Leone Civil War. He was accused of aiding the rebel Revolutionary United Front (RUF) through weapon sales in exchange for blood diamonds. Due to a UN embargo against arms sales to Liberia at the time, these weapons were largely purchased on the black market through arms smugglers such as Viktor Bout. Taylor was charged with aiding and abetting RUF atrocities against civilians, which left many thousands dead or mutilated, with unknown numbers of people abducted and tortured. He was also accused of assisting the RUF in the recruitment of child soldiers. In addition to aiding the RUF in these acts, Taylor reportedly personally directed RUF operations in Sierra Leone.

Taylor obtained spiritual and other advice from the evangelist Kilari Anand Paul. As president, he was known for his flamboyant style. Upon being charged by the UN of being a gunrunner and diamond smuggler during his presidency, Taylor appeared in all-white robes and begged God for forgiveness, while denying the charges. He was reported to have said that "Jesus Christ was accused of being a murderer in his time."

During the last four years of Taylor's presidency, he is believed to have stolen and diverted nearly $100 million, amounting to roughly half of total government revenue.

=== Rebellion and indictment ===
In 1999, a rebellion against Taylor began in northern Liberia, led by a group calling itself Liberians United for Reconciliation and Democracy (LURD). This group was frequently accused of atrocities, and is thought to have been backed by the government of neighboring Guinea. This uprising signaled the beginning of the Second Liberian Civil War.

By early 2003, LURD had gained control of northern Liberia. That year, a second Ivorian-backed rebel group, Movement for Democracy in Liberia (MODEL), emerged in southern Liberia and achieved rapid success. By the summer, Taylor's government controlled only about a third of Liberia: Monrovia and the central part of the country. More than one-third of the total population lived in this area.

On 7 March 2003, the Special Court for Sierra Leone (SCSL) issued a sealed indictment for Taylor. Earlier that year, Liberian forces had killed Sam Bockarie, a leading member of the RUF in Sierra Leone, in a shootout under Taylor's orders. Some have claimed that Taylor ordered Bockarie killed to prevent the leader from testifying against him at the SCSL.

In June 2003, Alan White, the Prosecutor to the Special Court unsealed the indictment and announced publicly that Taylor was charged with war crimes. The indictment asserted that Taylor created and backed the RUF rebels in Sierra Leone, who were accused of a range of atrocities, including the use of child soldiers. The Prosecutor also said that Taylor's administration had harbored members of Al-Qaeda sought in connection with the 1998 bombings of U.S. embassies in Kenya and Tanzania.

The indictment was unsealed during Taylor's official visit to Ghana, where he was participating in peace talks with MODEL and LURD officials. As result, the possibility arose that Taylor might be arrested by Ghanaian authorities; in response, Taylor's chief bodyguard and military commander Benjamin Yeaten threatened to execute Ghanaians who lived in Liberia, deterring Ghana's government from taking action. With the backing of South African president Thabo Mbeki and against the urging of Sierra Leone president Ahmad Tejan Kabbah, Ghana consequently declined to detain Taylor, who returned to Monrovia.

=== Resignation ===
During Taylor's absence for the peace talks in Ghana, the U.S. government was alleged to have urged Vice President Moses Blah to seize power. Upon his return, Taylor briefly dismissed Blah from his post, only to reinstate him a few days later.

In July 2003, LURD initiated a siege of Monrovia, and several bloody battles were fought as Taylor's forces halted rebel attempts to capture the city. The pressure on Taylor increased as U.S. President George W. Bush twice that month stated that Taylor "must leave Liberia". On 9 July, Nigerian President Olusegun Obasanjo offered Taylor exile in his country on the condition that Taylor stay out of Liberian politics.

Taylor insisted that he would resign only if U.S. peacekeeping troops were deployed to Liberia. Bush publicly called upon Taylor to resign and leave the country in order for any American involvement to be considered. Meanwhile, several African states, in particular the Economic Community of West African States (ECOWAS) under the leadership of Nigeria, sent troops under the banner of ECOMIL to Liberia.

Logistical support was provided by a California company called PAE Government Services Inc., which was given a $10 million contract by the U.S. State Department. On 6 August, a 32-member U.S. military assessment team was deployed as a liaison with the ECOWAS troops, landing from the 26th Marine Expeditionary Unit, commanded by Colonel A.P. Frick, from three U.S. Navy amphibious ships waiting off the Liberian coast.

On 10 August, Taylor appeared on national television to announce that he would resign the following day and hand power to Vice President Blah. He harshly criticized the United States in his farewell address, saying that the Bush administration's insistence that he leave the country would hurt Liberia. On 11 August, Taylor resigned, with Blah serving as president until a transitional government was established on 14 October. Ghanaian President John Kufuor, South African President Thabo Mbeki, and Mozambican President Joaquim Chissano, all representing African regional councils, were present at his announcement. The U.S. brought Joint Task Force Liberia's Amphibious Ready Group of three warships with 2,300 Marines into view of the coast. Taylor flew to Nigeria, where the Nigerian government provided houses for him and his entourage in Calabar.

== Exile ==
In November 2003, the United States Congress passed a bill that included a reward offer of two million dollars for Taylor's capture. While the peace agreement had guaranteed Taylor safe exile in Nigeria, it also required that he refrain from influencing Liberian politics. His critics said he disregarded this prohibition. On 4 December, Interpol issued a red notice regarding Taylor, suggesting that countries had a duty to arrest him. Taylor was placed on Interpol's Most Wanted list, declaring him wanted for crimes against humanity and breaches of the 1949 Geneva Convention, and noting that he should be considered dangerous. Nigeria stated it would not submit to Interpol's demands, agreeing to deliver Taylor to Liberia only in the event that the President of Liberia requested his return.

On 17 March 2006, Ellen Johnson Sirleaf, the newly elected President of Liberia, submitted an official request to Nigeria for Taylor's extradition. This request was granted on 25 March, whereby Nigeria agreed to release Taylor to stand trial in the Special Court for Sierra Leone (SCSL). Nigeria agreed only to release Taylor and not to extradite him, as no extradition treaty existed between the two countries.

=== Disappearance and arrest ===
Three days after Nigeria announced its intent to transfer Taylor to Liberia, the leader disappeared from the seaside villa where he had been living in exile. A week before that, Nigerian authorities had taken the unusual step of allowing local press to accompany census takers into Taylor's Calabar compound.

Nigerian President Olusegun Obasanjo was scheduled to meet with President Bush less than 48 hours after Taylor was reported missing. Speculation ensued that Bush would refuse to meet with Obasanjo if Taylor were not apprehended. Less than 12 hours prior to the scheduled meeting between the two heads of state, Taylor was reported apprehended en route to Liberia.

On 29 March, Taylor tried to cross the border into Cameroon through the border town of Gamboru in northeastern Nigeria. His Range Rover with Nigerian diplomatic plates was stopped by border guards, and Taylor's identity was eventually established.

Upon his arrival at Roberts International Airport in Harbel, Liberia, Taylor was arrested and handcuffed by LNP officers, who immediately transferred responsibility for the custody of Taylor to the United Nations Mission in Liberia (UNMIL). Irish UNMIL soldiers escorted Taylor aboard a UN helicopter to Freetown, Sierra Leone, where he was delivered to the SCSL.

== Trial ==
The Daily Talk newsboard documenting the Charles Taylor case

The SCSL prosecutor originally indicted Taylor on 3 March 2003 on 17 counts of war crimes and crimes against humanity committed during the conflict in Sierra Leone. On 16 March 2006, an SCSL judge gave leave to amend the indictment against Taylor. Under the amended indictment, Taylor was charged with 11 counts. At Taylor's initial appearance before the court on 3 April 2006, he entered a plea of not guilty.

In early June 2006, the decision on whether to hold Taylor's trial in Freetown or in Leidschendam had not yet been made by the new SCSL president, George Gelaga King. King's predecessor had pushed for the trial to be held abroad because of fear that a local trial would be politically destabilizing in an area where Taylor still had influence. The Appeals Chamber of the Special Court dismissed a motion by Taylor's defence team, who argued that their client could not get a fair trial there and also wanted the Special Court to withdraw the request to move the trial to Leidschendam.

On 15 June 2006, the British government agreed to jail Taylor in the United Kingdom in the event he was convicted by the SCSL. This fulfilled a condition laid down by the Dutch government, which had stated it was willing to host the trial but would not jail him if convicted. British Foreign Minister Margaret Beckett stated that new legislation would be required to accommodate this arrangement. This legislation came in the form of the International Tribunals (Sierra Leone) Act 2007. While awaiting his extradition to the Netherlands, Taylor was held in a UN jail in Freetown.

On 16 June 2006, the United Nations Security Council agreed unanimously to allow Taylor to be sent to Leidschendam for trial; on 20 June 2006, Taylor was extradited and flown to Rotterdam Airport in the Netherlands. He was taken into custody and held in the detention center of the International Criminal Court, located in the Scheveningen section of The Hague. The Association for the Legal Defence of Charles G. Taylor was established in June 2006 to assist in his legal defence.

When Taylor's trial opened on 4 June 2007, Taylor boycotted the proceeding and was not present. Through a letter that was read by his attorney to the court, he justified his absence by alleging that at that moment he was not ensured a fair and impartial trial.

On 20 August 2007, Taylor's defence, now led by Courtenay Griffiths, obtained a postponement of the trial until 7 January 2008. During the trial, the chief prosecutor alleged that a key insider witness who testified against Taylor went into hiding after being threatened for giving evidence against Taylor. Furthermore, Joseph "Zigzag" Marzah, a former military commander, testified that Charles Taylor celebrated his new-found status during the civil war by ordering human sacrifice, including the killings of Taylor's opponents and allies that were perceived to have betrayed Taylor, and by having a pregnant woman buried alive in sand. Marzah also accused Taylor of forcing cannibalism on his soldiers to terrorize their enemies.

In January 2009, the prosecution finished presenting its evidence against Taylor and closed its case on 27 February 2009. On 4 May 2009, a defence motion for a judgment of acquittal was dismissed, and arguments for Taylor's defence began in July 2009. Taylor testified in his own defence from July through November 2009. The defence rested its case on 12 November 2010, with closing arguments set for early February 2011.

On 8 February 2011, the trial court ruled in a 2–1 decision that it would not accept Taylor's trial summary, as the summary had not been submitted by the 14 January deadline. In response, Taylor and his counsel boycotted the trial and refused an order by the court to begin closing arguments. This boycott came soon after the 2010 leak of American diplomatic cables, in which the United States discussed the possibility of extraditing Taylor for prosecution in the United States in the event of his acquittal by the SCSL. Taylor's counsel cited the leaked cable and the court's decision as evidence of an international conspiracy against Taylor.

On 3 March, the appeals court of the SCSL overturned the trial court's decision, ruling that as the trial court had not established that Taylor had been counseled by the court and personally indicated his intent to waive his right to a trial summary, Taylor's due process rights would be violated by preventing him from submitting a trial summary. The appeals court ordered the trial court to accept the summary and set a date for the beginning of closing arguments. On 11 March, the closing arguments ended, and it was announced that the court would begin the process to reach a verdict.

=== Verdict ===
The verdict was announced in Leidschendam on 26 April 2012. The SCSL unanimously ruled that he was guilty of all 11 counts of "aiding and abetting" war crimes and crimes against humanity, making him the first (former) head of state to be convicted by an international tribunal since Karl Dönitz at the Nuremberg Trials. Taylor was charged with:

Count	Crime	Type*	Ruling
Terrorising the civilian population and collective punishments
1	Acts of terrorism	WC	Guilty
Unlawful killings
2	Murder	CAH	Guilty
3	Violence to life, health and physical or mental well-being of persons, in particular murder	WC	Guilty
Sexual violence
4	Rape	CAH	Guilty
5	Sexual slavery and any other form of sexual violence	CAH	Guilty
6	Outrages upon personal dignity	WC	Guilty
Physical violence
7	Violence to life, health and physical or mental well-being of persons, in particular, cruel treatment	WC	Guilty
8	Other inhumane acts	CAH	Guilty
Use of child soldiers
9	Conscripting or enlisting children under the age of 15 years into armed forces or groups, or using them to participate actively in hostilities	VIHL	Guilty
Abductions and forced labor
10	Enslavement	CAH	Guilty
Looting
11	Pillage	WC	Guilty

*Explanation of type of crime:

- CAH: Crimes against humanity
- WC: Violation of Article 3 common to the Geneva Conventions and of Additional Protocol II (war crimes)
- VIHL: Other serious violation of international humanitarian law

At his trial, Taylor claimed that he was a victim, denied the charges and compared his actions of torture and crimes against humanity to the actions of George W. Bush in the war on terror. Sentencing hearings commenced on 3 May and were announced on 30 May. Taylor was sentenced to 50 years in prison. He was about 64 years of age at the time of sentencing.

Sierra Leone's government described the sentence as "a step forward as justice has been done, though the magnitude of the sentence is not commensurate with the atrocities committed".

Taylor appealed against the verdict, but on 26 September 2013, Appeals Chamber of the Special Court confirmed his guilt and the penalty of 50 years in prison.

=== Imprisonment ===
On 15 October 2013, Taylor was transferred to British custody, and began serving his sentence at HM Prison Frankland in County Durham, England. The UK passed a short Act of Parliament in 2007, to dovetail into existing international tribunals' legislation, to enable the UK government to meet its 2006 offer to imprison Taylor if convicted. Taylor's attorneys filed a motion to have him transferred to a prison in Rwanda, but in March 2015, the motion was denied and he was ordered to continue serving his sentence in the United Kingdom. In January 2017, it was found that he had been making phone calls from the prison to provide guidance to the National Patriotic Party and threaten some of his enemies.

In October 2021, Taylor filed a complaint against the Liberian government for "non-payment of his retirement". This complaint was lodged with the Court of Justice of the Economic Community of West African States (ECOWAS).

== Personal life ==
In 1997, Taylor married Jewel Taylor, with whom he has one son. She filed for divorce in 2005, citing her husband's exile in Nigeria and the difficulty of visiting him due to a UN travel ban on her. The divorce was granted in 2006. From January 2018 to January 22, 2024, Jewel Taylor served as Vice President of Liberia with George Manneh Weah.

Phillip Taylor, Taylor's son with Jewel, remained in Liberia following his father's extradition to the SCSL. He was arrested by Liberian police officials on 5 March 2011 and charged with attempted murder in connection with an assault on the son of an immigration officer who had assisted in Charles Taylor's extradition; the mother of the victim claimed that Phillip Taylor had sworn vengeance against the immigration officer. He was arrested at Buchanan in Grand Bassa County, allegedly while attempting to cross the border into the Ivory Coast.

Taylor has three children with his second wife Victoria Addison Taylor; the youngest, Charlize, was born in March 2010. In 2014, Victoria was denied a visa to visit her husband while he serves his sentence in the United Kingdom.

Taylor also has another son, a U.S. citizen named Charles McArther Emmanuel, born to his college girlfriend. Emmanuel was arrested in 2006 after entering the United States and was charged with three counts, including participation in torture while serving in the Anti-Terrorist Unit in Liberia during his father's presidency. The law that prosecuted Emmanuel was put in place in 1994, before "extraordinary rendition" in an attempt to prevent U.S. citizens from committing acts of torture overseas. To date, this is the only prosecuted case. In October 2008, Emmanuel was convicted on all three counts and sentenced to 97 years in prison.

Charles Taylor is also said to have been the husband or partner to Agnes Reeves Taylor. Agnes and Charles met when Taylor was head of the General Services Agency in the mid-1980s during the regime of former President Samuel Kanyon Doe. According to Trial international, Charles Taylor and Agnes Reeves Taylor married in Ghana in 1986. However, according to allafrica.com, the two were never legally married. She is reported to have left Liberia in 1992 before the end of the civil war and settled in the United Kingdom where she was a lecturer at Coventry University. On 2 June 2017, she was arrested in London by the Metropolitan Police and charged with torture on the grounds of her suspected involvement with the National Patriotic Front of Liberia (NPFL) rebel group, which was led by her ex-husband, during the First Liberian Civil War, from 1989 to 1996. On 6 December 2019 the Central Criminal Court (The Old Bailey) in London decided to dismiss the charges against Agnes Reeves Taylor. The Court's decision came after the UK Supreme Court confirmed, in a historic judgment on 13 November 2019, that members of non-state armed groups may be prosecuted for crimes of torture under section 134(1) of the UK Criminal Justice Act 1988, thus legally paving the way for the case against Agnes Reeves Taylor to proceed to trial. However, after rendering its judgment, the UK Supreme Court sent the case back to the Central Criminal Court to consider further evidence from the prosecution's expert and apply the legal standard confirmed by the Supreme Court to the facts of the case. In order for a member of a non-state armed group to be prosecuted for torture, the group must have been exercising "governmental functions". The Central Criminal Court ruled that the evidence presented by the Crown Prosecution Service (CPS) failed to prove that the NPFL had the requisite authority over the relevant territory at the time the crimes in question were committed. Therefore, the court dismissed the case.

On January 21, 2026, Jewel Howard-Taylor announced the death of their son, Charles Phillip Taylor Jr.

== In popular culture ==
- Taylor is a prominent character in the 2004 novel The Darling by Russell Banks.
- The character Andre Baptiste Sr. from the 2005 film Lord of War is partially based on Taylor.
- Taylor appears in the 2008 documentary Pray the Devil Back to Hell.
- Idris Elba's Commandant character from the 2015 film Beasts of No Nation is partially based on Taylor.

== See also ==
- Exotic Tropic Timber Enterprises – Libyan timber company and arms trader

Political offices
Preceded by Ruth Perry as Chairperson of the Council of State of Liberia	President of Liberia; 1997–2003	Succeeded by Moses Blah
