= List of by-elections in Liberia =

The following is a list of by-elections in Liberia.

== List of by-elections ==
Date	Constituency	Incumbent	Party	Winner	Party	Cause
May 13, 2006 (1st round); May 2006 (2nd round)	Rivercess-1	Ronald Alexander Mitchell	IND	Elizabeth Pennoh Williams	UP	Election overturned
August 29, 2006 (1st round); September 12, 2006 (2nd round)	Margibi-2	Ansu Washington Lackie	UP	Kollie Sorsor Jallah	CDC	Death
February 6, 2007 (1st round); February 2007 (2nd round)	Nimba-6	David Saye Maneh	UP	Evans Vaye Koah	UP	Death
July 10, 2007 (1st round); July 24, 2007 (2nd round)	Grand Bassa-3	Edward Sundaygar	LP	Jeh Byron Browne	LP	Death
December 4, 2007 (1st round); December 18, 2007 (2nd round)	Gbarpolu (Senate)	Samuel Tormetie	NRP	J. S. B. Theodore Momo	UP	Death
February 2008 (1st round); February 26, 2008 (2nd round)	Margibi-4	Flasher Chideryou	IND	Ballah Zayzay	UP	Death
February 2009 (1st round); February 2009 (2nd round)	River Gee (Senate)	Isaac N. Johnson	LAP	Nathaniel Williams	LDP	Death
November 10, 2009 (1st round); November 24, 2009 (2nd round)	Montserrado (Senate)	Hannah G. Brent	CDC	Geraldine Doe-Sheriff	CDC	Death
July 20, 2010 (1st round); August 3, 2010 (2nd round)	River Gee-3	Albert S. Toe	LP	Christian S. Chea	UP	Death
April 3, 2012	Sinoe-3	Nelson Wah Barh	UP	Matthew G. Zarzar	UP	Death
July 3, 2012	Montserrado-11	Moses Tandapoli	CDC	J. Gabriel Nyenka	UP	Death
May 7, 2013	Grand Bassa (Senate)	John F. Whitfield	NPP	Nyonblee Karnga-Lawrence	LP	Death
April 21, 2015	Rivercess-2	Francis Paye	NDC	Byron Zahnwea	MPC	Resigned, elected to Senate.
December 29, 2015	Lofa-2	Fofi S. Baimba	UP	Julie Fatorma Wiah	IND	Death
February 28, 2017	Lofa-1	Eugene F. Kparkar	LP	Francis S. Nyumalin	ULD	Death
July 31, 2018	Bong (Senate)	Jewel Taylor	CDC	Henrique Tokpa	IND	Resigned, elected Vice President
July 31, 2018	Montserrado (Senate)	George Weah	CDC	Saah Joseph	CDC	Resigned, elected President
November 20, 2018	Montserrado-13	Saah Joseph	CDC	Augustine Chea	CDC	Resigned, elected to Senate
November 20, 2018	Sinoe (Senate)	Joseph N. Nagbe	APD	Edward Papay Flomo	IND	Resigned, appointed to Supreme Court
July 29, 2019 (Note: A partial second round was held in for the Montserrado-15 House by-election on August 28, 2019.)	Montserrado-15	Adolph Lawrence	CDC	Abu Kamara	CDC	Death
July 29, 2019	Montserrado (Senate)	Geraldine Doe-Sheriff	UP	Abraham Dillon	LP (CPP)	Death
October 5, 2019	Grand Cape Mount (Senate)	Edward B. Dagoseh	UP	Victor V. Watson	PUP	Death
December 8, 2020	Montserrado-9	Munah Pelham-Youngblood	CDC	Frank Saah Foko Jr.	CDC	Death
December 8, 2020	Sinoe-2	J. Nagbe Sloh	CDC	Samson Wiah	CDC	Death
November 16, 2021	Bomi-1	Edwin Snowe	IND	Finda Gborie Lansanah	IND	Resigned, elected to Senate
November 16, 2021	Bong-2	Prince Moye	CPP	James M. Kolleh	PUP	Resigned, elected to Senate
November 16, 2021	Nimba-1	Jeremiah Koung	MDR	Samuel N. Brown Sr.	IND	Resigned, elected to Senate
November 16, 2021	Grand Gedeh-1	Zoe E. Pennue Sr.	CDC	Erol Madison Gwion	LRP	Resigned, elected to Senate
June 28, 2022	Lofa (Senate)	Brownie Samukai	UP	Joseph Kpator Jallah	IND	Criminal conviction
April 23, 2024	Grand Gedeh-1	Erol Madison Gwion	CDC	Jeremiah Sokan Sr.	IND	Death
April 23, 2024	Nimba (Senate)	Jeremiah Koung	MDR	Nya D. Twayen Jr.	UP	Resigned, elected Vice President
April 22, 2025	Nimba (Senate)	Prince Johnson	MDR	Samuel Kogar	MDR	Death
August 12, 2025	Nimba-5	Samuel Kogar	MDR	Kortor Kwagrue	MDR	Resigned, elected to Senate.
