= 2022 Liberian by-election =

The 2022 Liberian by-election was held on June 28 in Lofa County. It was triggered by the criminal conviction of Senator-elect Brownie Samukai. Originally scheduled for May 10, the by-election was postponed due to legal matters. The election resulted in the victory of Joseph Kpator Jallah, an independent candidate backed by the ruling Coalition for Democratic Change. A number of opposition groups and individuals disputed the election results.

== Background ==
Former Defense Minister Brownie Samukai was elected to the Senate for Lofa County on the Collaborating Political Parties (CPP) ticket on December 8, 2020. Following his election, the National Elections Commission (NEC) withheld his certification due to a criminal conviction he had received earlier after pleading guilty to misappropriating over a million dollars in funds from the Armed Forces of Liberia. Initially charged with a two-year prison sentence and mandate to repay the misappropriated funds, President George Weah suspended Samukai's prison sentence, without removing the mandate.

Due to Samukai's ineligibility to hold office, President pro tempore of the Senate, Albert Tugbe Chie, declared the Lofa County seat vacant, and Senate secretary J. Nanborlor Singbeh notified the NEC of the vacancy on February 16, 2022. The declaration of the vacancy was controversial, among citizens as well as politicians due to the questionable legality. Conmany Wesseh was one senator who disagreed with the vacancy declaration, as he was of the opinion that only a court could decide Samukai's eligibility to hold office.

By April, the NEC released a provisional list of five candidates for the by-election, excluding the Unity Party (UP) nominee, Galakpai W. Kortimai, due to legal challenges to his candidacy. Chairman of the Liberty Party (LP) Musa Bility had sent a complaint to the NEC, claiming the UP was unable to field a candidate in the by-election due to a section of the CPP framework document. The UP had been one of the original constituent parties of the CPP, alongside the, LP, Alternative National Congress (ANC), and the All Liberian Party (ALP). The ALP withdrew from the alliance in December 2021. The UP withdrew in February 2022. The letter argued that the CPP framework prevented any withdrawn constituent party from fielding candidates for any election until after the 2023 general election. On April 21, the NEC's hearing officer ruled the matter was a constitutional question and was therefore outside of the jurisdiction of the NEC, and must be decided by the Supreme Court.

The NEC originally planned for the by-election to be held on May 10. On May 6, the NEC had announced that due to the legal matters regarding the UP and CPP, the by-election would need to be indefinitely suspended, with a new date to be determined by the legislature. On June 3, the Supreme Court ruled that the section of the CPP framework document preventing the UP from fielding candidates was unconstitutional, and as such, was null and void. By mid June, both chambers of the legislature agreed in a joint resolution that June 28 would be the new date for the by-election. Campaigning officially began on June 20 and ended on June 26.

The list of candidates was announced on June 14. There were six candidates in total. Two candidates with parties, those being Galakpai Kortimai of the UP and Sumo G. Kupee of the People's Unification Party (PUP). The remaining independent candidates were Joseph K. Jallah, Momo T. Cyrus, Mariamau B. Fofana, and George Beyan Samah.

FrontPage Africa had reported that Jallah, Kortimai, and Cyrus were the main three contenders in the race. Jallah had run for the Lofa County Senate seat before. He had won third place in the 2011 election, and second place in two consecutive elections after that, in 2014 and 2020. The ruling Coalition for Democratic Change (CDC) did not field a candidate of their own for the Lofa County by-election, but they did endorse Jallah. Kortimai had served as the superintendent of Lofa County from 2006 to 2012 and was the county chairman of the UP at the time of the election. Lofa County had been considered a reliable stronghold for the UP vote. Kortimai was endorsed by Samukai. Cyrus was a sports figure as well as businessman from Voinjama who had founded a large private security organization. Fofana was the only woman in the race. Her and Samah were both incumbent members of the House of Representatives, Fofana serving in Lofa County's 4th district and Samah serving in Montserrado County's 12th district. Kupee represented Lofa County in the Senate from 2006 to 2014.

== Aftermath ==
The election was held on June 28. Voter turnout was low. Vote tallying began on June 29. Provisional results from 381 of 454 of polling places, or 83.92% of the total vote, were released on June 30. They showed Jallah in the lead. Jallah was declared the winner of the election by the NEC on July 1. Jallah became a member of the CDC after the election results were announced.

The election was peaceful. Freedom House stated that the election was "largely free, fair, and transparent despite some tensions between party supporters during the vote counting process." After the provisional results were released, Cyrus and Fofana congratulated Jallah on his victory. Some officials of the UP however rejected the results. Mo Ali, secretary general of the UP, posted to Facebook results which conflicted with the NEC's, which put the UP candidate Kortimai in the lead. Some UP members congratulated Kortimai on his victory and accused the NEC of rigging the election in favor of the CDC. After Jallah was declared the victor, UP Political Leader Joseph Boakai would also make allegations of malpractice by the NEC. Other opposition groups and individuals that joined in on malpractice claims against the NEC included Nyonblee Karnga-Lawrence of the LP, Benoni Urey of the ALP, the Liberian People's Party, and the National Democratic Coalition. Chairman of the opposition CPP Alexander B. Cummings did not dispute the election results.

The UP threatened legal action against the NEC. Jallah was certificated by the NEC on July 13.

== Results ==
The following are the results for the 2022 by-election from the NEC.

2022 Lofa County Senatorial By-election
Candidate	Party	Votes	%
Joseph Kpator Jallah	Independent	22,019	36.46
Galakpai W. Kortimai	Unity Party	21,229	35.15
Mariamu Bayen Fofana	Independent	6,010	9.95
Momo Tarnuekollie Cyrus	Independent	5,687	9.42
Sumo G. Kupee	People's Unification Party	2,828	4.68
George Beyan Samah	Independent	2,621	4.34
Total		60,394	100.00
Valid votes		60,394	96.60
Invalid/blank votes		2,125	3.40
Total votes		62,519	100.00
IND gain from CPP			
