= List of senators from Rivercess County =

Rivercess County highlighted in red.

Rivercess County elects two senators to the Senate of Liberia. It is currently represented by Wellington Geevon Smith and Bill Teah Twehway.

== List of senators ==
| Senator Elected | Year (Note: Indicates the year or years the senator was elected.) | Party (Note: Indicates party the senator was registered with during their election.) | Notes |
|---|---|---|---|
| Jay Jonathan Banney | 2005 | UP | Ran with the PUP for re-election in 2014. Ran with the LPP in 2023. |
| George Dee Moore | 2005 | LP | Ran with the UP for re-election in 2011. |
| Dallas Advertus V. Gueh | 2011 | LDP | Ran with the CDC for re-election in 2020. |
| Francis Saturday Saye | 2014 | NDC | |
| Wellington Geevon Smith | 2020 | IND | |
| Bill Teah Twehway | 2023 | CDC | |

== See also ==
- Rivercess County House of Representatives districts
  - Rivercess-1
  - Rivercess-2
