= List of senators from River Gee County =

River Gee County highlighted in red.

River Gee County elects two senators to the Senate of Liberia. It is currently represented by Jonathan Sogbie and Francis Saidy Dopoh II.

== List of senators ==
Senator Elected	Year (Note: Indicates the year or years the senator was elected.)	Party (Note: Indicates party the senator was registered with during their election.)	Notes
Frederick Doe Cherue	2005	COTOL	
Isaac Nyenekartoe Johnson	2005	COTOL	Later joined the LAP. Died in office in 2008.
J. Nathaniel Williams	2009	LDP	
Matthew N. Jaye	2011	IND	
Conmany B. Wesseh	2014	UP	
Jonathan Boycharles Sogbie	2020	CPP	
Francis Saidy Dopoh II	2023	IND	

== See also ==
- River Gee County House of Representatives districts
  - River Gee-1
  - River Gee-2
  - River Gee-3
