= List of senators from Lofa County =

Lofa County highlighted in red.

Lofa County elects two senators to the Senate of Liberia. It is currently represented by Joseph Kpator Jallah and Momo T. Cyrus.

== List of senators ==
| Senator Elected | Year (Note: Indicates the year or years the senator was elected.) | Party (Note: Indicates party the senator was registered with during their election.) | Notes |
|---|---|---|---|
| Sumo G. Kupee | 2005 | COTOL | Ran with the PUP for re-election in 2014. Ran again with the PUP in 2022. |
| Fomba Kanneh | 2005 | ALCOP | |
| George Tamba Tengbeh | 2011 | UP | Ran with the CDC for re-election in 2020. |
| Stephen J. H. Zargo | 2014 | LP | Ran with the UP for re-election in 2023. |
| Brownie Jeffrey Samukai | 2020 | CPP | Became legally unable to serve after a criminal conviction in 2022. |
| Joseph Kpator Jallah | 2022 | IND | |
| Momo T. Cyrus | 2023 | IND | |

== See also ==
- Lofa County House of Representatives districts
  - Lofa-1
  - Lofa-2
  - Lofa-3
  - Lofa-4
  - Lofa-5
