= List of senators from Margibi County =

Margibi County highlighted in red.

Margibi County elects two senators to the Senate of Liberia. It is currently represented by Emmanuel J. Nuquay and Nathaniel F. McGill.

== List of senators ==
Senator Elected	Year (Note: Indicates the year or years the senator was elected.)	Party (Note: Indicates party the senator was registered with during their election.)	Notes
Clarice Alpha Jah	2005	LP	Ran with the CPP in 2023.
Roland Cooper Kaine	2005	CDC	Ran with the ULD for re-election in 2011. Ran with the ULD again in 2014.
Oscar A. Cooper	2011	UP	Ran as an independent for re-election in 2020.
Jim Womba Tornonlah	2014	PUP	
Emmanuel James Nuquay	2020	PUP	
Nathaniel F. McGill	2023	CDC	

== See also ==
- Margibi County House of Representatives districts
  - Margibi-1
  - Margibi-2
  - Margibi-3
  - Margibi-4
  - Margibi-5
