= List of senators from Grand Gedeh County =

Grand Gedeh County highlighted in red.

Grand Gedeh County elects two senators to the Senate of Liberia. It is currently represented by Zoe Emmanuel Pennue and Thomas Nimely.

== List of senators ==
Senator Elected	Year (Note: Indicates the year or years the senator was elected.)	Party (Note: Indicates party the senator was registered with during their election.)	Notes
Isaac Wehyee Nyenabo	2005	NDPL	
William Cheyety Sandy	2005	COTOL	Ran with the ULD for re-election in 2011.
Alphonso G. Gaye	2011	UP	
A. Marshall Dennis	2014	CDC	
Zoe Emmanuel Pennue Sr.	2020	CDC	
Thomas Yaya Nimely	2023	LRP	

== See also ==
- Grand Gedeh County House of Representatives districts
  - Grand Gedeh-1
  - Grand Gedeh-2
  - Grand Gedeh-3
