= List of senators from Grand Cape Mount County =

Grand Cape Mount County highlighted in red.

Grand Cape Mount County elects two senators to the Senate of Liberia. It is currently represented by Simeon Boima Taylor and Dabah M. Varpilah.

== List of senators ==
Senator Elected	Year (Note: Indicates the year or years the senator was elected.)	Party (Note: Indicates party the senator was registered with during their election.)	Notes
Abel Momolu Massalay	2005	NPP	
James Kormah Momo	2005	NPP	Failed re-election in 2011. Ran with the ULD in 2014.
Edward Boakai Dagoseh	2011	UP	Died in office in 2019.
Varney Sherman	2014	UP	Ran as an independent for re-election in 2023.
Victor Varney Watson	2019	PUP	Ran with the CDC for re-election in 2020. Ran as an independent in 2023.
Simeon Boima Taylor	2020	CPP	
Dabah M. Varpilah	2023	UP	

== See also ==
- Grand Cape Mount County House of Representatives districts
  - Grand Cape Mount-1
  - Grand Cape Mount-2
  - Grand Cape Mount-3
