= List of senators from Maryland County =

Maryland County highlighted in red.

Maryland County elects two senators to the Senate of Liberia. It is currently represented by J. Gbleh-bo Brown and James P. Biney.

== List of senators ==
Senator Elected	Year (Note: Indicates the year or years the senator was elected.)	Party (Note: Indicates party the senator was registered with during their election.)	Notes
John Akel Ballout Jr.	2005	UP	Ran as an independent in 2020.
Gloria Maya Musu-Scott	2005	UP	
H. Dan Morais	2011	NPP	Ran as an independent for re-election in 2020. Ran with the CPP in 2023.
J. Gbleh-bo Brown	2014	IND	
J. Gbleh-bo Brown	2023	CDC	
James Pobee Biney	2020	CDC	

== See also ==
- Maryland County House of Representatives districts
  - Maryland-1
  - Maryland-2
  - Maryland-3
