= List of senators from Grand Bassa County =

Grand Bassa County highlighted in red.

Grand Bassa County elects two senators to the Senate of Liberia. It is currently represented by Gbehzohngar M. Findley and Nyonblee Karnga-Lawrence.

== List of senators ==
Senator Elected	Year (Note: Indicates the year or years the senator was elected.)	Party (Note: Indicates party the senator was registered with during their election.)	Notes
Gbehzohngar Milton Findley	2005	IND	Failed re-election in 2014. Ran with the CDC in 2020.
Gbehzohngar Milton Findley	2023	IND	
Nathaniel K. Innis Sr.	2005	LP	
John Francis Whitfield Jr.	2011	NPP	Died in office in 2013.
Nyonblee Karnga-Lawrence	2013	LP	
Nyonblee Karnga-Lawrence	2020	CPP	
Jonathan Lambort Kaipay	2014	LP	

== See also ==
- Grand Bassa County House of Representatives districts
  - Grand Bassa-1
  - Grand Bassa-2
  - Grand Bassa-3
  - Grand Bassa-4
  - Grand Bassa-5
