= List of senators from Gbarpolu County =

Gbarpolu County highlighted in red.

Gbarpolu County elects two senators to the Senate of Liberia. It is currently represented by Botoe Kanneh and Amara M. Konneh.

== List of senators ==
Senator Elected	Year (Note: Indicates the year or years the senator was elected.)	Party (Note: Indicates party the senator was registered with during their election.)	Notes
Samuel Sumo Tormetie	2005	NRP	Died in office in 2007.
Daniel Naatehn	2005	UP	Failed re-election in 2011.
Daniel Naatehn	2014	ANC	Died in office in 2023.
J. S. B. Theodore Momo	2007	UP	Ran with the APD for re-election in 2014.
Armah Zolu Jallah	2011	NPP	Ran with the PUP for re-election in 2020.
Botoe Kanneh	2020	IND	
Amara Mohammed Konneh	2023	IND	

== See also ==
- Gbarpolu County House of Representatives districts
  - Gbarpolu-1
  - Gbarpolu-2
  - Gbarpolu-3
