= List of senators from Grand Kru County =

Grand Kru County highlighted in red.

Grand Kru County elects two senators to the Senate of Liberia. It is currently represented by Albert Tugbe Chie and Numene T. H. Bartekwa.

== List of senators ==
Senator Elected	Year (Note: Indicates the year or years the senator was elected.)	Party (Note: Indicates party the senator was registered with during their election.)	Notes
Cletus Segbe Wotorson	2005	COTOL	
Blamoh Nelson	2005	APD	
Peter Sonpon Coleman	2011	CDC	
Albert Tugbe Chie	2014	IND	
Albert Tugbe Chie	2023	CDC	
Numene T. H. Bartekwa	2020	IND	

== See also ==
- Grand Kru County House of Representatives districts
  - Grand Kru-1
  - Grand Kru-2
