= List of senators from Bong County =

Bong County highlighted in red.

Bong County elects two senators to the Senate of Liberia. It is currently represented by Prince K. Moye and Johnny K. Kpehe.

== List of senators ==
Senator Elected	Year (Note: Indicates the year or years the senator was elected.)	Party (Note: Indicates party the senator was registered with during their election.)	Notes
Jewel Howard-Taylor	2005	NPP	
Jewel Howard-Taylor	2014	NPP	Resigned in 2018 after being elected vice president.
Franklin Obed Siakor	2005	IND	Ran with the LP in 2014.
Henry Willie Yallah	2011	NDC	Ran with the CDC for re-election in 2020.
Henrique Flomo Tokpa	2018	IND	Ran with the UP for re-election in 2023.
Prince K. Moye	2020	CPP	
Johnny K. Kpehe	2023	IND	

== See also ==
- Bong County House of Representatives districts
  - Bong-1
  - Bong-2
  - Bong-3
  - Bong-4
  - Bong-5
  - Bong-6
  - Bong-7
