= List of senators from Sinoe County =

Sinoe highlighted in red.

Sinoe County elects two senators to the Senate of Liberia. It is currently represented by Augustine S. Chea and Crayton O. Duncan.

== List of senators ==
Senator Elected	Year (Note: Indicates the year or years the senator was elected.)	Party (Note: Indicates party the senator was registered with during their election.)	Notes
Mobutu Vlah Nyenpan	2005	APD	
Joseph Nyenetue Nagbe	2005	APD	
Joseph Nyenetue Nagbe	2011	APD	Resigned, appointed to Supreme Court in 2018.
Juojulue Milton Teahjay	2014	UP	Ran as an independent for re-election in 2023.
Augustine S. Chea	2018	CDC	
Augustine S. Chea	2020	CDC	
Crayton O. Duncan	2023	CDC	

== See also ==
- Sinoe County House of Representatives districts
  - Sinoe-1
  - Sinoe-2
  - Sinoe-3
