= Grand Bassa-5 =

Electoral district in Liberia

- Constituency for the House of Representatives of Liberia
- Electorate: 30,499 (2023)

Current constituency
- Representative: Thomas A. Goshua II

Grand Bassa-5 is an electoral district for the elections to the House of Representatives of Liberia. It is located in a south-western portion of Grand Bassa County, bordering Rivercess County.

== Elected representatives ==
Year	Representative elected	Party	Notes
2011	Robertson N. Siaway Sr.	APD	
2017	Thomas A. Goshua II	UP	
2023	Thomas A. Goshua II	CPP	

== Election results ==
2011 Grand Bassa County's 5th House District Election
Candidate	Party	Votes	%
Robertson N. Siaway Sr.	Alliance for Peace and Democracy	4,328	32.89
Johnson Y. Gbor	Liberty Party	2,059	15.65
Morris Blayan Johnson	Unity Party	2,013	15.30
Robert Tuesday Vonyeegar	Congress for Democratic Change	1,086	8.25
John Sieah Cee	Liberia Transformation Party	1,068	8.12
George Wor-Yun-Won Harmon	National Democratic Coalition	703	5.34
Reuben S. Smith	Movement for Progressive Change	555	4.22
Eurrison Wlehwleh Freeman	Original Congress Party of Liberia	554	4.21
John Guenter Tarr	Grassroot Democratic Party of Liberia	352	2.68
Peter Y. Padmore	Progressive Democratic Party	238	1.81
King Alfred Gbassagee	Citizens Unification Party	202	1.54
Total		13,158	100.00
Valid votes		13,158	92.05
Invalid/blank votes		1,137	7.95
Total votes		14,295	100.00

2017 Grand Bassa County's 5th House District Election
Candidate	Party	Votes	%
Thomas A. Goshua II	Unity Party	5,193	29.20
Christine Juah Settro Dennis	Independent	3,101	17.43
Johnson Yahweh Gbor	Liberty Party	2,591	14.57
Robertson N. Siaway Sr. (Incumbent)	United People's Party	2,135	12.00
Morris B. Johnson	Liberia Transformation Party	1,034	5.81
Mmonbeydo N. Joah Harrell	Alternative National Congress	1,026	5.77
Ernest Galison Gibson	Independent	891	5.01
Samuel G. Bennett	Coalition for Democratic Change	522	2.93
Easy E. Yarlatee	Liberia Restoration Party	427	2.40
Morris Gbennee Beah	Movement for Economic Empowerment	354	1.99
Eurrison W. Freeman	True Whig Party	265	1.49
Solomon P. Gbargee	People's Unification Party	248	1.39
Total		17,787	100.00
Valid votes		17,787	93.95
Invalid/blank votes		1,145	6.05
Total votes		18,932	100.00
