= Nimba-5 =

Electoral district in Liberia

- Constituency for the House of Representatives of Liberia
- Electorate: 29,823 (2023)

Current constituency
- Representative: Kortor Kwagrue

Nimba-5 is an electoral district for the elections to the House of Representatives of Liberia. It is located in an eastern portion of Nimba County, bordering the Ivory Coast.

== Elected representatives ==
Year	Representative elected	Party	Notes
2005	Jackson Saye Flindor	CDC	
2011	Samuel G. Kogar	NUDP	
2017	Samuel G. Kogar	PUP	
2023	Samuel G. Kogar	PUP	Resigned after elected to the Senate with the MDR.
2025	Kortor Kwagrue	MDR	
