= Rivercess-2 =

Electoral district in Liberia

- Constituency for the House of Representatives of Liberia
- Electorate: 19,701 (2023)

Current constituency
- Representative: Steve Tequah

Rivercess-2 is an electoral district for the elections to the House of Representatives of Liberia. It is located in a southern portion of Rivercess County, bordering Grand Bassa, Grand Gedeh, and Sinoe counties.

== Elected representatives ==
Year	Representative elected	Party	Notes
2005	Jerry Bowier Masseh	UP	
2011	Francis S. Paye	NDC	Resigned after elected to the Senate.
2015	Byron W. Zahnwea	MPC	
2017	Byron W. Zahnwea	UP	
2023	Steve Tequah	IND	
