= River Gee-2 =

Electoral district in Liberia

- Constituency for the House of Representatives of Liberia
- Electorate: 13,756 (2023)

Current constituency
- Representative: Isaac B. Choloplay Wuo

River Gee-2 is an electoral district for the elections to the House of Representatives of Liberia. It is located in a central portion of River Gee County, bordering Grand Gedeh, Grand Kru, and Maryland counties.

== Elected representatives ==
| Year | Representative elected | Party | Notes |
|---|---|---|---|
| 2005 | Elijah Flahn Seah | APD | |
| 2011 | Christian S. Chea | UP | |
| 2017 | Francis Saywon Young | MOVEE | |
| 2023 | Isaac B. Choloplay Wuo | CDC | |
