= Nimba-2 =

Electoral district in Liberia

- Constituency for the House of Representatives of Liberia
- Electorate: 38,662 (2023)

Current constituency
- Representative: Nyahn Garsaye Flomo

Nimba-2 is an electoral district for the elections to the House of Representatives of Liberia. It is located in a northern portion of Nimba County, bordering the Republic of Guinea.

== Elected representatives ==
| Year | Representative elected | Party | Notes |
|---|---|---|---|
| 2005 | Martin M. Farngalo | COTOL | |
| 2011 | Prince O. S. Tokpah | NUDP | |
| 2017 | Prince O. S. Tokpah | PUP | |
| 2023 | Nyahn Garsaye Flomo | CPP | |
