= Nimba-6 =

Electoral district in Liberia

- Constituency for the House of Representatives of Liberia
- Electorate: 29,994 (2023)

Current constituency
- Representative: Dorwohn Twain Gleekia

Nimba-6 is an electoral district for the elections to the House of Representatives of Liberia. It is located in an eastern portion of Nimba County, bordering Grand Gedeh County and the Ivory Coast.

== Elected representatives ==
Year	Representative elected	Party	Notes
2005	David Saye Maneh	UP	Died in office.
2007	Evans Vaye Koah	UP	
2011	Ricks Y. Toweh	NUDP	
2017	Dorwohn Twain Gleekia	PUP	
2023	Dorwohn Twain Gleekia	MDR	
