= Charlyne Brumskine =

Liberian lawyer, politician and philanthropist

Charlyne M. Brumskine
- Charlyne Brumskine

Vice Standard-Bearer of the Collaborating Political Parties
- In office 2023–2023

Personal details
- Party: Liberty Party
- Other political affiliations: Collaborating Political Parties
- Relatives: Charles Brumskine (father)
- Education: Columbia University Howard University School of Law
- Profession: Lawyer, politician, philanthropist
- Known for: Advocacy for gender rights and rule of law

Charlyne M. Brumskine (born 1976) is a Liberian lawyer, entrepreneur and politician. She is the first Liberian woman to be appointed to the ECOWAS Community Court of Justice for the 2026 to 2030 statutory period. Brumskine is the founder and managing attorney of CMB Law Group, LLC, one of Liberia's leading law firms and served as the vice-presidential candidate of the Collaborating Political Parties in the 2023 Liberian general election, running alongside Alexander B. Cummings Jr. A graduate of Columbia University and Howard University School of Law, she has built a career as an attorney and advocate on constitutional law, gender rights and governance reform.

Brumskine is the daughter of Charles Brumskine, a Liberian politician, founder of the Liberty Party, and former President pro tempore of the Liberian Senate. Through both legal and philanthropic work, she has promoted education for girls, expanded access to justice, and encouraged political participation among women and youth in Liberia.

== Early life and education ==
Brumskine was born into the Bassa ethnic community, with family roots in Buchanan, Grand Bassa County and in Yekepa, Nimba County.

She graduated from Columbia University in New York City, and later obtained a Juris Doctor degree from the Howard University School of Law in Washington, D.C.

== Career ==

Brumskine trained and practiced as a lawyer before entering frontline politics, focusing on issues of constitutional law and gender rights.

In 2023, she was nominated as the Vice Standard-Bearer of the Collaborating Political Parties coalition, becoming the running mate of Alexander B. Cummings Jr. in the 2023 Liberian general election. Her campaign emphasized on accountability, youth empowerment and strengthening Liberia’s institutions.

== Philanthropy ==
Beyond politics, Brumskine has been active in philanthropy, particularly in initiatives supporting girls’ education, community development and access to legal aid for underprivileged groups.

== Personal life ==
Brumskine is married to Charles Dennis and they have two children.
