= Rivercess-1 =

Electoral district in Liberia

- Constituency for the House of Representatives of Liberia
- Electorate: 20,240 (2023)

Current constituency
- Representative: Alex J. Grant

Rivercess-1 is an electoral district for the elections to the House of Representatives of Liberia. It is located in a northern portion of Rivercess County, bordering Grand Bassa, Nimba and Grand Gedeh counties.

== Elected representatives ==
Year	Representative elected	Party	Notes
2005	Ronald Alexander Mitchell	IND	Election overturned.
2006	Elizabeth Pennoh Williams	UP	
2011	Alfred G. Juweh Sr.	LDP	
2017	Rosana G. D. H. Schaack	LP	
2023	Alex J. Grant	IND	
