= Montserrado-15 =

Electoral district

- Constituency for the House of Representatives of Liberia
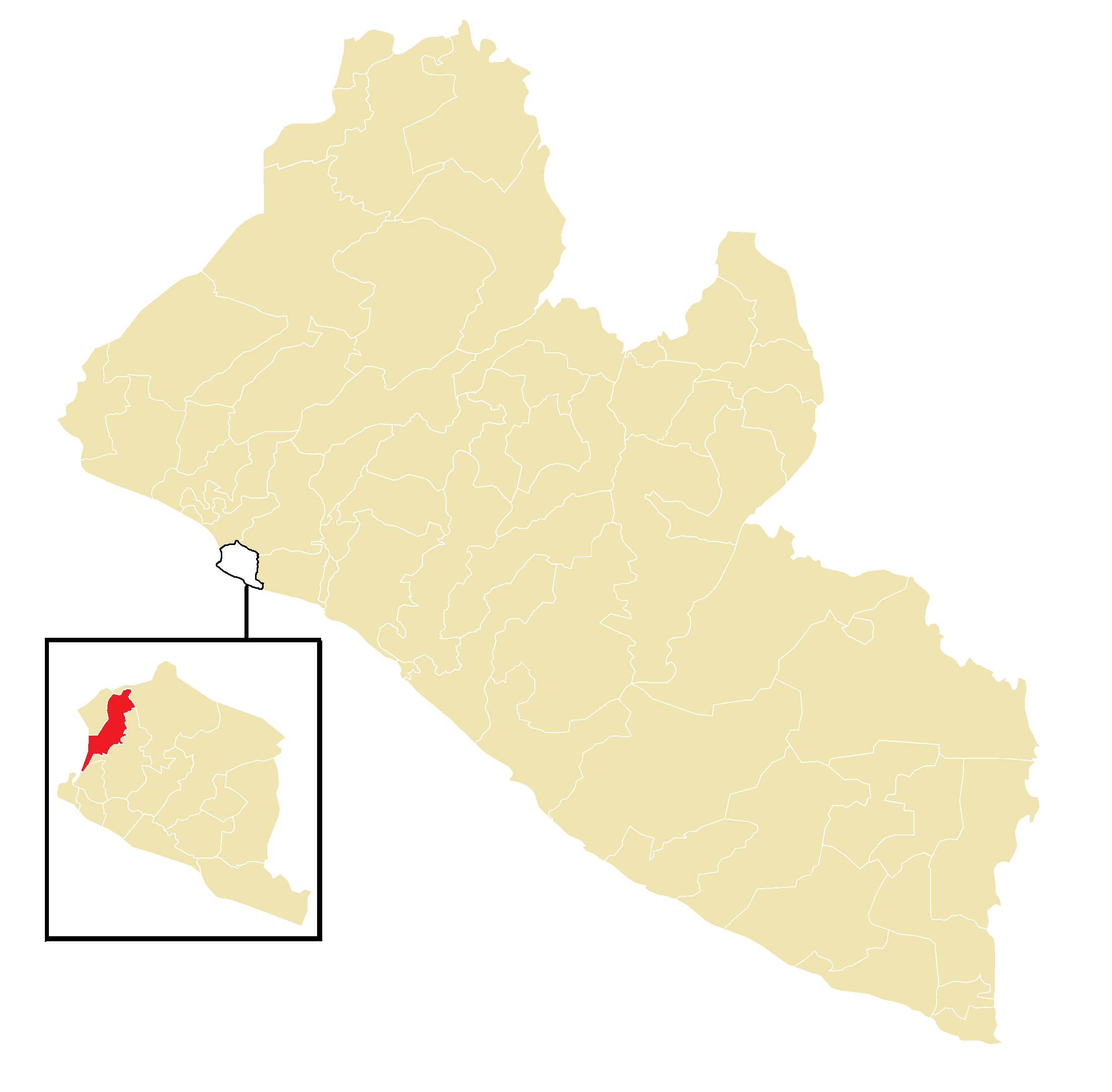
- Electorate: 41,673 (2023)

Current constituency
- Created: 2011
- Representative: Abu Bana Kamara

Montserrado-15 is an electoral district for the elections to the House of Representatives of Liberia. The district covers the northern parts of Garwolon Township, i.e. the communities of Blamo Town, Central Logan Town, Free Port Development, Gbandi Town, King Peter Town, Little White Chapel, Vicky Spot, Zinc Camp and Zondo Town, as well as the western parts of Caldwell Township, i.e. Caldwell Community, New Georgia Road, Central Caldwell and Lower Caldwell A.

== Elected representatives ==
| Year | Representative elected | Party | Notes |
|---|---|---|---|
| 2011 | Adolph A. Lawrence | Ind. | |
| 2017 | Adolph A. Lawrence | CDC | Died in office. |
| 2019 | Abu Bana Kamara | CDC | |
| 2023 | Abu Bana Kamara | CDC | |
