= Nyonblee Karnga-Lawrence =

Liberian politician

Nyonblee Karnga-Lawrence (born 2 July 1968) is a Liberian politician who has served as President Pro Tempore of the country's senate since January 2024. She is the leader of the opposition Liberty Party.

== Early life and education ==
Nyonblee Karnga was born on 2 July 1968 and raised in Grand Bassa County, Liberia, growing up during the civil wars. Her father, Abba G. Karnga, was the presiding bishop of the World Wide Mission of Liberia and her mother was an educator and gospel singer. She has 12 siblings. She has a degree in business management from the University of Liberia and an MBA from Kutztown University of Pennsylvania in the United States.

In October 2024, the African Methodist Episcopal Zion University awarded Karnga-Lawrence an honorary Doctorate of Business Administration in recognition of her dedication to Liberia's progress.

== Career ==
Karnga-Lawrence was a public relations manager at the Liberia Petroleum Refining Company before entering politics.

Karnga-Lawrence was elected to the national legislature to represent Grand Bassa County in 2013 following the death of Senator John Whitfield. She was the first female senator from the county and the only one in the senate during her first term. She was then elected to a full term, endorsed by the Collaborating Political Parties (CPP), in December 2020. Karnga-Lawrence was nicknamed "lioness" and "iron lady of the Senate" for her advocacy for gender equality and social justice.

Karnga-Lawrence chaired the CPP, a coalition made up of the country's top four opposition parties. She became leader of the Liberty Party in 2017 after the death of the party's founder Charles Brumskine. She chairs the committee on Rules, Order, and Administration and is a member of the Ways, Means, and Finance, Public Accounts, Health and Gender, and Post and Post Telecommunications committees.

In June 2022, Karnga-Lawrence was elected chair of the Women Legislative Caucus, laying out a plan to ensure all women lawmakers were retained after the 2023 elections.

Karnga-Lawrence was proposed as a potential running mate for Unity Party candidate Joseph Boakai in the 2023 presidential elections, and was praised for her decision to support him despite not being selected.

Karnga-Lawrence was elected Pro-Tempore of the Liberian Senate in January 2024 after being nominated for the position by Senator Prince Moye of Bong County. She is the second woman to hold the role after Grace Minor. Karnga-Lawrence has publicly committed herself to "transparency, accountability and responsible governance" as the country continues to reform. In August 2024, she attended the Democratic National Convention in Chicago USA as part of the International Leaders Forum (ILF), seeking to give political leaders insights into America's democratic system. In September 2024, she visited Beijing as part of a legislator's forum for friendly exchanges with China. In October 2024, she received criticism from representative Clarence Banks, who suggested she had appointed county leaders based on political loyalty rather than competence.

== Personal life ==
Karnga-Lawrence was married to Adolph Lawrence, a geologist and member of the House of Representatives, until his death in a car accident on his 50th birthday in 2019. She has three biological and seven adopted children. Prior to entering politics, she established a local non profit foundation called Nyonblee Cares which focuses on improving the socio-economic wellbeing of impoverished Liberians. During the Ebola crisis, her international advocacy and outreach resulted in the approval of $7 billion to combat the virus.
