= Adolph Lawrence =

Liberian politician (1966–2019)

Adolph Akwe Lawrence (March 24, 1966 – March 24, 2019) was a Liberian politician who was a member of the House of Representatives between 2012 and his death in 2019. Lawrence was killed in a motor accident. He was married to Grand Bassa County Senator Nyonblee Karnga-Lawrence. In the legislature, Lawerence represented the District 15 of Montserrado County. He was elected as an independent in 2011. In 2017, he was elected with the Congress for Democratic Change.
