= 2025 Nimba County Senate by-election =

By-election in Liberia

The 2025 Nimba County Senate by-election was held on 22 April 2025. It was triggered by the death of Senator Prince Johnson on 28 November 2024.

== Candidates ==
There are 7 candidates. Initially there were 8 candidates, however, Justin Oldpa Yeazehn, also known as Prophet Key, was disqualified. The candidates are:

- Edith Gongloe-Weh
- Samuel Gongben Kogar
- Garrison Yealue
- R. Matenckay Tingban
- Mack Gbliwon
- Torbor Tee Wonokay Farngalo
- Dr. George Parkinson Gonpu

== Results ==
The voter turnout was reportedly low.

Candidate	Party	Votes	%
Samuel Gongben Kogar	Movement for Democracy and Reconstruction	62,136	52.08
Edith Lianue Gongloe-Weh	Independent	40,506	33.95
B. Mack Gblinwon	Citizens Movement for Change	7,489	6.28
Garrison Doldeh Yealue Jr.	Independent	5,513	4.62
Richard Matenokay Tingban	Vision for Liberia Transformation	1,557	1.31
George Parkinson Gonpu	African Democratic Movement of Liberia	1,114	0.93
Torbor Tee Wonokay Farngalo	Independent	987	0.83
Total		119,302	100.00
Valid votes		119,302	97.54
Invalid/blank votes		3,010	2.46
Total votes		122,312	100.00
Registered voters/turnout		307,254	39.81
Source: NEC

== See also ==
- List of by-elections in Liberia
