= Conmany Wesseh =

Liberian politician

Member of the Senate of Liberia from River Gee County
- In office 2015–2024
- Preceded by: Matthew N. Jaye
- Succeeded by: Francis Saidy Dopoh II

Personal details
- Born: 24 March 1953 (age 73)
- Party: Unity Party

Conmany B. Wesseh (born 24 March 1953) is a Liberian politician and former activist.

Conmany Wesseh studied at the University of Liberia, and was a member of the Movement for Justice in Africa (MOJA) during the 1979 Rice Riots, in which MOJA played a key role. During the Liberian Civil War, Wesseh worked with Amos Sawyer as executive director and co-founder of the Center for Democratic Empowerment. After the war, he joined Ellen Johnson Sirleaf's Unity Party. Sirleaf appointed him to several positions within her government, including Ambassador to the United Nations. He ran for the Liberian Senate in 2005, 2009, and 2011, losing each time. However, he won his 2014 campaign for senate with 26.1% of the vote. His home county of River Gee's Legislative Caucus indefinitely suspended Wesseh's membership in the caucus in 2018. Although Wesseh was indefinitely suspended from the caucus, he retained his position as senator.

Wesseh was defeated for re-election by Francis Saidy Dopoh II in the 2023 Senate election.
