= Amara Mohamed Konneh =

Liberian politician (born 1971)

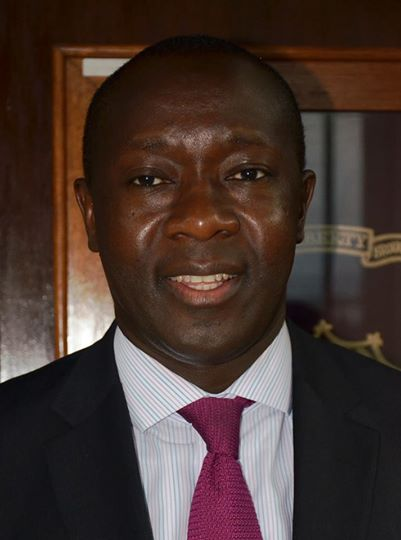

Minister of Finance of Liberia
- In office February 2012 – April 2016
- President: Ellen Johnson Sirleaf
- Preceded by: Augustine Kpehe Ngafuan
- Succeeded by: Boima Kamara

Personal details
- Born: December 7, 1972 (age 53) Balla-Bassa
- Party: Independent
- Education: Massachusetts Institute of Technology; Harvard University; Pennsylvania State University; Drexel University.
- Profession: Political and Economic Development Professional
- Website: https://senatoramarakonneh.gov.lr/

Amara M. Konneh (born December 7, 1972) is a Liberian national who serves as a Senator from Gbarpolu County, Western Liberia. Previously, he served as a senior advisor for Africa for the World Bank. In this role, he advised the World Bank on regional economic integration to create economic hubs for value chains and helped build strategic partnerships with Africa's regional economic commissions. Before that, he served as lead advisor for the Bank's engagements in countries affected by fragility, conflict, violence, and forced displacement with emphasis on Ethiopia, Eritrea, Kenya, and Nigeria.

In the 2023 general election, Konneh was elected to the Senate of Liberia, representing Gbarpolu County as an independent.

Amara Konneh leveraged technology to showcase his ethical leadership when he prevented an election heist by the incumbent Liberian Government in the country’s 2023 elections.

Upon winning his senate race in Gbarpolu County, Liberia, and before his public endorsement of candidate Joseph Boakai, he analyzed the first round results to establish a winning path for Mr. Boakai and his Unity Party Alliance. With his fifty-one percent victory projection for Mr. Boakai, the candidate asked him to coordinate the campaign in the runoff. Mr. Konneh deployed an elaborate election monitoring system using mobile phone technology and laptop computers with thousands of staff which he coordinated from a secure Situation Room. Another critical component he added to the strategy was security to protect poll watchers and prevent double voting.

His contribution to the opposition’s victory in Liberia came to the forefront when he made an unprecedented move to begin announcing the results ahead of the National Election Commission (NEC). This bold action not only showcased his expertise and confidence in the accuracy of the data his team was transmitting from the precincts but also highlighted his commitment to transparency in the democratic process.

His nightly announcements ahead of the NEC became a turning point in the election, setting a new standard for openness and accountability. Even the NEC officials were unable to challenge his results. Ethical Leadership played a pivotal role in running an effective election situation room, where he and his team worked tirelessly to protect the Liberian people’s votes. The Situation Room not only ensured the security of the electoral system but also swiftly responded to any potential threats or irregularities.

== Background ==
Konneh joined the World Bank Group in May 2016 as head of the Global Hub for Fragility, Conflict, Violence and Forced Displacement (FCV) in Nairobi serving more than 35 countries in Africa, Asia, and the Middle East. In this position, he successfully coordinated the World Bank's strategic priorities in countries affected by fragility, conflict, violence, and refugees on the ground. He led the Nairobi-based team to provide operational and analytical support on fragility, conflict, violence and refugee issues to affected countries and built a community of practice for knowledge management and exchange; and managed relationships with the donor community in Nairobi on behalf of the Bank. This work took Mr. Konneh to some of the world's hotspots including Somalia, Myanmar, Syria, Afghanistan, among others where he contributed substantially to the Bank's support to these countries. He is the recipient of the prestigious Harvard University's Kennedy School of Government's 2016 Alumni Public Service Award that recognizes an alumna who has significantly improved the human condition at the local, state/provincial, national or international levels. Mr. Konneh was also named Africa's Finance Minister of the Year 2014 by The Banker magazine, a subsidiary of the Financial Times for his efforts to reform, stabilize and grow the post-conflict Liberian economy. He was featured in Africa's New Leaders; mentioned in the following books: ‘Emerging Africa: How 17 Countries Are Leading the Way by Dr. Steve Radelet, This Child Will be Great by Ellen Johnson Sirleaf, and Choosing My Hero by Riva Levinson; and featured in ‘Africa’s Reformers: Re-Writing Governance’ by former British Prime Minister Tony Blair's Africa Governance Initiative.

== Early life and career ==
Konneh was born on December 7, 1972, in Balla Bassa, Gbamah District, Gbarpolu County, Liberia to the late Majumah Konneh and the late Mamadee Konneh. He spent his formative years in Balla Bassa Town then moved to Monrovia in 1985 in order to continue his formal education having completed elementary school. He graduated from Monrovia College (high school) in 1990.

Shortly after graduating high school, Konneh became a refugee in Guinea and established a free school for Liberian refugees with proceeds from corn and beans he harvested from his farm. His leadership at the school led to an offer by the International Rescue Committee to serve as the Education Coordinator for Liberian and Sierra Leonean refugee schools throughout Beyla Prefecture in the Guinea Forest Region. He served in this capacity from 1991 - 1993 and supervised the development of 18 community schools, including the first high school in the Beyla Prefecture, and coordinated curriculum development, teacher training, and resource mobilization.

Upon emigration to the United States in 1993, he enrolled at Drexel University where he was awarded the Anthony J. Drexel Academic and Leadership Scholarship and earned a Bachelor of Science degree in information systems with distinction, following which he earned a graduate degree in management from Pennsylvania State University. He worked at Vanguard Group of Investment Companies, a Fortune 500 Company in Valley Forge, Pennsylvania where he was recruited into the highly competitive and prestigious Smart Leadership Program upon graduation. After more than a decade of working with development foundations and as a policy, financial systems analyst and project manager in Guinea and the United States, Konneh returned to Liberia to serve his country in 2006.

== Career ==
Konneh's career began at the Vanguard Group of Investment Companies in 1999, recruited through the Vanguard Group's Smart Leadership Program. Before that, he worked briefly with the International Rescue Committee as a coordinator for refugee schools in Guinea, West Africa.

He is a graduate of the Massachusetts Institute of Technology’s Sloan School of Management where he holds a master’s degree in business administration, the John F. Kennedy School of Government at Harvard University where he received a master's degree in public administration with a concentration in political and economic development. He also holds a master's degree from Pennsylvania State University and a bachelor's degree from Drexel University in Philadelphia, Pennsylvania.

Before that, Konneh served as Liberia's Minister of Finance and Development Planning from February 2012 to April 2016. He is credited with helping to stabilize the Liberian economy from the effects of a protracted civil war, the twin shocks of commodity price declines for Liberia's primary commodities – rubber and iron ore – and the Ebola pandemic that almost brought the Liberian economy to its knees in 2014 by implementing prudent fiscal and structural policies for macroeconomic stability. Under his stewardship and even with the devastating impact of Ebola and commodity price decline on the economy, the average growth rate for the Liberian economy was 6 percent; average inflation was 8 percent; while the average exchange rate was US$1 to LD$84 and average budget deficits were 3.4 percent. He maintained timely payment of civil servants’ salaries and mobilized unprecedented financing for the Ellen Johnson Administration's post-conflict reconstruction projects. Before the Ebola crisis and after commodity prices declined affecting iron ore and rubber, Konneh championed reforms that led to the establishment of the Liberia Revenue Authority to enhance fiscal policymaking and shore up domestic revenue mobilization. His radical stance on keeping expenditures under control caused the Liberian Senate to sanction him for prison, a decision that was overturned by the Liberian Supreme Court.

Konneh regularly publishes his opinions on governance and political economy issues affecting the world and Africa, particularly in post-conflict settings. Some of his recent writings include (1) Democracy in West Africa, the ‘road less travelled’?; (2)What the West Can Learn From Africa’s Ebola Response; (3) The Economics of Ebola (4) Ebola isn't just a health crisis - It's a social & economic one too

== Deputy Chief of Staff ==
Upon the election of President Ellen Johnson Sirleaf in 2005, Konneh was named Deputy Chief of Staff for Policy and Communications within the Ministry of State for Presidential Affairs. In this role, he spearheaded several initiatives including:

- Reforming the management practices at the Ministry of State through a performance improvement program;
- Coordinating the development of policies and communications strategy;
- Organizing Liberia's first conference on Information and Communication Technologies for Development (ICT4D); and
- Improving the Executive Mansion's relationship with the Liberian Media by giving them increased access to the Presidency and creating better working conditions.

After a year and a half of serving in this capacity, Konneh took a sabbatical in order to enroll at the John F. Kennedy School of Government at Harvard University, where he earned a master's degree in public administration with an emphasis in political and economic development and a certificate in Public Policy.

Upon completion of his studies at Harvard, Minister Konneh returned to Liberia and was appointed by President Sirleaf as the 16th Minister of Planning and Economic Affairs of the Republic of Liberia.

== Minister of Planning and Economic Affairs ==
In August 2008, Konneh was sworn in as Liberia's Minister of Planning and Economic Affairs. He also served concurrently as the National Coordinator of the Liberia Reconstruction and Development Committee and the National Authorizing Officer of the European Development Fund for Liberia. Under his leadership, the implementation of the three years Lifts Liberia Poverty Reduction Strategy (PRS I) was accelerated resulting in a successful conclusion. Konneh is a core member of President Johnson Sirleaf's Economic Management Team and is credited with helping to stabilize the Liberian economy from the effects of a protracted civil war. His accomplishments included rebuilding the Ministry of Planning's internal capacity to support Liberia's post-war reconstruction; unscrupulously implementing Liberia's three -Year development strategy (2008-2011) Poverty Reduction Strategy that seeks to enhance security, revitalize the economy after years of conflict, rehabilitate infrastructure and resume the provision of basic services such as education, healthcare, water and sanitation services to the population; and improving governance and the rule of law. He is the architect of Liberia's new long-term development plan Liberia Rising 2030 Vision, and a five-year Medium Term Development Strategy - the Agenda for Transformation ( PRS II 2012-2017), both of which seek to make Liberia a lower-middle-income country by 2030 by focusing on inclusive growth through enhanced security, justice and the rule of law; economic transformation through increased investment in energy, roads, and ports; human development through education, health, water and sanitation; improving governance and public institutions; and addressing unemployment. He is also credited for strengthening aid coordination mechanisms that have seen increased aid on budget; developing a ten-year National Human Capacity Development Strategy to reverse Liberia's brain drain; harmonizing the activities of non-governmental organizations (NGOs) with the national development agenda, and promoting the use of Information and Communication Technologies for Development (ICT4D) that led to the landing of a $25 million African Coast to Europe (ACE) fiber-optic high-speed Internet cable in Liberia.

As Liberia's alternate governor to the World Bank and African Development Bank, Konneh played a key supporting role in the waiver of Liberia's US$4.6 billion debt. He also played a key role in the cancellation of Liberia's US$170 million debt obligation to the Paris Club, a small group of creditor nations. One of Konneh's major accomplishments as Minister of Planning and Economic Affairs was the development of Liberia's three-year Millennium Challenge Account Threshold proposal which he negotiated with the United States Millennium Challenge Corporation for a US$15 million grant to reform land rights and access, increase girls’ primary education completion rate, and develop a trade policy regime consistent with regional standards. He is also credited for leading the efforts to restore to the Government of Liberia full authorizing authority over budget support garnered from the European Union (EU) that was previously administered by the EU office in Abidjan as a result of the Liberian conflict.

== Minister of Finance ==
Upon the re-election of President Ellen Johnson Sirleaf in 2011, Konneh was nominated to the post of Minister of Finance and was confirmed by the Liberian Senate in February 2012. Since becoming finance minister, Liberia's post-war economic growth was sustained in 2012 and 2013, with estimated real GDP growth of 8.9% and 8.7, respectively, led by mining, buoyant construction, and strong performance in services. Growth was projected to be impressive in 2014, due in no small measure to macroeconomic stability and supported by further mining and agriculture-related Foreign Direct Investments (FDI) but was affected by a health crisis - the Ebola Virus Disease (EVD) - and the global commodity price shock. Consumer price inflation moderated to 6.9% in 2012. This strong performance also reflects a higher-than-anticipated acceleration in non-mining activities boosted by robust private and public investments in line with the government's five-year development strategy, the Agenda for Transformation (AfT) for which he is credited formulating. As Finance Minister, he has advocated the following priorities for the government:

- Investing in infrastructure - especially electricity, about $1 billion to restore power destroyed by the war. Liberia has the highest cost of electricity in the world which constrains private investment;
- Investing in human capital formation;
- Accelerating economic growth via a clear strategy to leverage Liberia's agricultural potential;
- Investing in developing the private sector, especially Liberian-owned businesses;
- Address the issues and concerns of Liberia's youth through technical and vocational education; and
- Investing to create economic and political opportunities for all Liberians.

To support the growth envisioned in the government's medium-term growth strategy, the Agenda for Transformation, Minister Konneh quickly introduced a Medium Term Expenditure Framework (MTEF), a multi-year rolling budget framework that began in the fiscal year 2012/2013 that saw an increase in public investments from a mere 7 percent of the budget to about 25 percent to finance critical infrastructure projects.

Through an aggressive mobilization of domestic and external financing, he has led the government's efforts that have raised more than $2 billion US Dollars to support the Agenda for Transformation. The most significant projects are the restoration of electricity to the country, construction of major highways to connect Liberia's main economic corridors and rehabilitation of the country's sea and airports. Most of the funding secured so far constitutes grants with about 20% in concessional loans from various lenders including the World Bank, the African Development Bank, European Investment Bank, Kuwaiti and Saudi Funds and other bilateral financings.

Through his leadership, he has ensured full compliance with the Public Financial Management Act under difficult circumstances, by implementing its core regulations. Through his administration, Liberia produced for the first time a mid-term budget performance report and a year-end report that is being audited by the General Auditing Commission, crucial compliance requirements of the Public Financial Management Act which has become a tradition now by the Ministry of Finance and Development.

Konneh has also worked to improve Liberia's tax administration through a major reform he championed with the creation of the Liberia Revenue Authority (LRA) and has automated the chaotic voucher processing system at the Ministry of Finance that has improved the payment process and significantly reduced duplication. During his tenure, the Ministry of Finance has made great strides towards the decentralization of payroll though more challenges remain.

He introduced for the first time in Liberia, the “Open Budget Initiative” -a platform through which citizens can access the budget and government spending, making Liberia the first country where ordinary citizens can now track spending to various sectors including health, education, infrastructure, etc. via mobile phones, on the Internet, through community radio stations, and on an electronic billboard. This reform is also complemented by the publication of the Citizens Guide to the Budget, a yearly publication that is distributed nationwide to empower citizens to hold spending entities accountable for results. He has made headlines for rooting out corruption within the Ministry of Finance and for championing the Open Budget Initiative.

== Minister of Finance and Development Planning ==
In July 2014, Konneh was appointed Liberia's first Minister of Finance and Development Planning, having previously served concurrently as Minister of Planning and Economic Affairs and Minister of Finance from January 2012 to June 2014. He is credited for stabilizing the Liberian economy from the effects of the most recent effects of the Ebola Virus Disease (EVD) outbreak that almost brought the Liberian economy to its knees.

With the EVD having halted the implementation of the AfT and dropped the nation's economic growth rate from a projected 5.9 to zero percent, Minister Konneh worked with stakeholders in government, development partners community, private sector and civil society to maintain macroeconomic stability during the crisis, resulting in the stable exchange rate and inflation in spite of a sharp decline in economic growth; availability of essential goods and services in the country given that Liberia is an import intensive country; and instituted fiscal policies that prioritized financing the fight against Ebola early during the outbreak when the international response was slow. He tightened coordination within the economic management team with strong support from the President and took the actions that were necessary to avert an imminent economic collapse. Under his leadership, the team at the Ministry of Finance and Development Planning formulated a post-Ebola Economic Stabilization and Recovery Plan (ESRP) that is currently being implemented by the Government to achieve optimum impact for the last two years of the Johnson Sirleaf Administration. The Plan was an off-shoot of the existing Agenda for Transformation (AfT) but incorporated additional programs and interventions to specifically address the impact of EVD on the economy and the population, and the commodity price shock that has affected two of Liberia's main commodities - iron ore and rubber. He also coordinated the robust Ebola response effort along with key stakeholders and spearheaded the mobilization of financial and non-financial resources for the fight against Ebola effort from government, bilateral and multilateral partners, NGOs, state-owned enterprises and the private sector.

He also established and provided oversight of the Ebola Trust Fund, ensuring that all Ebola response agencies received timely resources and accounted for them; while also leading his team to maintain consistent salary payments for the entire civil service (including furloughed staff) throughout the crisis.

== Leadership ==
- Chairman, Public Accounts, Expenditures, and Audits Committee; Co-Chair, Banking and Curewmcy Committee; Ranking Member, Foreign Affairs Committee, Liberian Senate.
- Liberia's Governor on the Board of Governors of the World Bank, International Monetary Fund and African Development Bank, 2012 - 2016.
- Chair, IMF Africa Group I Constituency, 2014 - 2016.
- Chair, Board of Directors, Liberia Bank for Development and Investment, 2012 - 2016.
- Member, Board of Commissioners, Liberia Investment Commission: helped to attract over US$16 billion in Foreign Direct Investment commitments in iron ore, forestry, rubber and palm oil, 2014 - 2016.
- Chair, Board of Governors, ECOWAS Bank for Investment and Development.
- Former Chair, African Peer Review Mechanism Committee of Focal Points, 2013–2014.
- Member, Economic Community of West African States (ECOWAS) Ministerial Council, 2008 - 2016
- Chair, Mano River Union Ministerial Council, 2008 - 2012.

== Awards and professional recognition ==
- Admitted: Order of the Star of Africa with the Grade of Grand Band
- 2016 Alumni Public Service Award, Harvard University Kennedy School of Government
- Minister of Finance of the Year 2014 for Africa, The Banker Magazine, a subsidiary of Financial Times;
- Featured in Africa's New Leaders
- Mentioned in the book ‘Emerging Africa: How 17 Countries Are Leading the Way;
- Featured in ‘Africa’s Reformers: Re-Writing Governance’ by former British Prime Minister Tony Blair's Africa Governance Initiative.

== See also ==
- Ministry of Finance, Liberia
- World Bank
