= Jonathan Sogbie =

Liberian footballer

Personal information
- Date of birth: 1 February 1970 (age 56)
- Position: Forward

Senior career*
Years	Team	Apps	(Gls)
1992–1993	ASEC Mimosas		
1993–1995	Lausanne-Sport	50	(27)
1995–1997	Servette	46	(6)
1999	Connecticut Wolves	12	(2)
2000	Rhode Island Stingrays	17	(10)
2001	Chongqing Lifan	10	(1)
2002	Rhode Island Stingrays	13	(6)

International career
1988–1998	Liberia	20	(6)
- * Club domestic league appearances and goals

Jonathan Boye Charles Sogbie (born 1 February 1970) is a Liberian politician and former professional footballer who played as a forward. At club level Sogbie played for ASEC Mimosas, Lausanne-Sport, Servette, Connecticut Wolves, Rhode Island Stingrays, and Chongqing Lifan. Sogbie also played for the Liberia national team between 1990 and 1998. After his retirement from football, he entered politics, and is noted for being an opponent of his former teammate George Weah, who was then the President of Liberia. He previously served as the public relations manager at the National Oil Company of Liberia.

Sogbie ran unsuccessfully for the Senate of Liberia in a 2009 by-election as an independent. In December 2020, he was elected as a member of the Senate of Liberia, the upper house of the bicameral legislative branch of Liberia, representing River Gee County on the ticket of the Collaborating Political Parties.
