= Thomas Nimely =

Liberian politician

Thomas Yaya Nimely (born 1956) is a Liberian politician and former rebel leader who has served as a senator for Grand Gedeh County since 2024.

During the Second Liberian Civil War, Nimely founded the Movement for Democracy in Liberia (MODEL) rebel group in opposition to president Charles Taylor. Following Taylor's overthrow in 2003, he served as foreign minister between 2005 and 2006 in the government of Ellen Johnson Sirleaf. He was elected to the Senate of Liberia during the 2023 Liberian general election as a member of the Liberia Restoration Party (LRP).

== Career ==
In 2003 he became the leader of the Movement for Democracy in Liberia (MODEL), which soon became Liberia's second largest rebel group. Following the exile of President Charles Taylor, Nimely led his group into the transitional government which was formed on 14 October 2003. He then served as the foreign minister of Liberia until February 2006, when the elected President Ellen Johnson Sirleaf took office and established her new cabinet.

== See also ==
- Second Liberian Civil War
