= Albert Tugbe Chie =

Liberian politician

Albert Tugbe Chie is a Liberian politician and Member of the Senate of Liberia from Grand Kru County Constituency who has served as President Pro Tempore of the Senate of Liberia from 2018 to 2024.

Chie was elected to the Senate in 2014 as an independent. In 2023, he was elected with the Coalition for Democratic Change.

On 12 December 2023, the United States Department of State imposed a travel ban on Chie due to allegations of corruption.
