= Brownie Samukai =

Liberian politician

Minister of National Defence
- In office 16 January 2006 – 22 January 2018
- Appointed by: Ellen Johnson Sirleaf
- Preceded by: Daniel Chea
- Succeeded by: Daniel Dee Ziankahn

Personal details
- Parent: Brownie J. Samukai, Sr. (1914–2009) (father)
- Education: University of Liberia

Brownie Jeffery Samukai Jr. is the former Minister of National Defence of Liberia. He took office on January 16, 2006, as part of President Ellen Johnson Sirleaf's Cabinet.

In the 1980s, he worked within the Liberian Ministry of National Defense. In 1986-87 he was working within the G-4 Branch of the AFL.

In 1991, according to biographical details issued at a 2007 U.S. Institute of Peace briefing, he was appointed as Deputy Minister of Defence for Operations. The biographical details said that he 'was responsible for reestablishing civilian control over the Liberian army and established an urban response team to counter urban terrorism.' He served in this position until 1994.

In 1993 and 94, he served as commander of the 'Black Berets,' a paramilitary police force in the Monrovia enclave of Amos Sawyer's Interim Government of National Unity (IGNU). The International Crisis Group also notes that the Black Berets also fought alongside ECOMOG at times, notably during Charles Taylor's 1992 assault on Monrovia ('Operation Octopus'). 'They and the AFL were accused of killing some 600 civilians in the June 1993 Camp Carter massacre, which, testimony at the Liberian Truth and Reconciliation Commission has indicated, was perpetuated by Taylor's NPFL fighters, who may have orchestrated it to put blame on the Armed Forces of Liberia.'

He served as Director of the Liberian National Police from 1994 to 1995 and Deputy Minister of State for Administration from 1995 to 1997.

In 1998 he served on the AFL Restructuring Commission, where he was listed as a retired Colonel of the AFL in private business.

From 1999 to c.2004-05, he served as a security officer with the United Nations, initially with UNTAET in East Timor, and then from 2000 with United Nations High Commissioner for Refugees and the UN Department of Safety and Security in Tanzania. Responsible for refugee resettlement in Tanzania.

On 27 January 2022, Samukai, with associates, was convicted and ordered imprisoned for embezzlement:

The Supreme Court of Liberia has handed down two-year prison sentences to former defence chief Brownie Samukai along with deputies Joseph Johnson and James Nyuman Ndokor after they failed to return U.S.$1,1 million worth of stolen money from a government pension account. The funds were stolen from the Armed Forces of Liberia pension account during the mandate of former President Ellen Johnson-Sirleaf when Samukai headed the defense ministry. The three men were ordered by the court to pay U.S. .. [$537,828.15] within six months but failed to do so.
