= Senate of Liberia =

Upper house of Liberian legislature

Senate
- 55th Liberian Legislature

Type
- Type: Upper house
- Term limits: Unlimited 9-year terms

Leadership
- President of the Senate: Jeremiah Koung, MDR since 22 January 2024
- President pro tempore: Nyonblee Karnga-Lawrence, LP since 15 January 2024

Structure
- Seats: 30
- Political groups: Coalition for Democratic Change (9) Unity Party (3); Collaborating Political Parties (3); Movement for Democracy and Reconstruction (2); People's Unification Party (1); All Liberian Party (1); Liberia Restoration Party (1) Independents (10)

Elections
- Voting system: First-past-the-post
- Last election: 10 October 2023

Meeting place
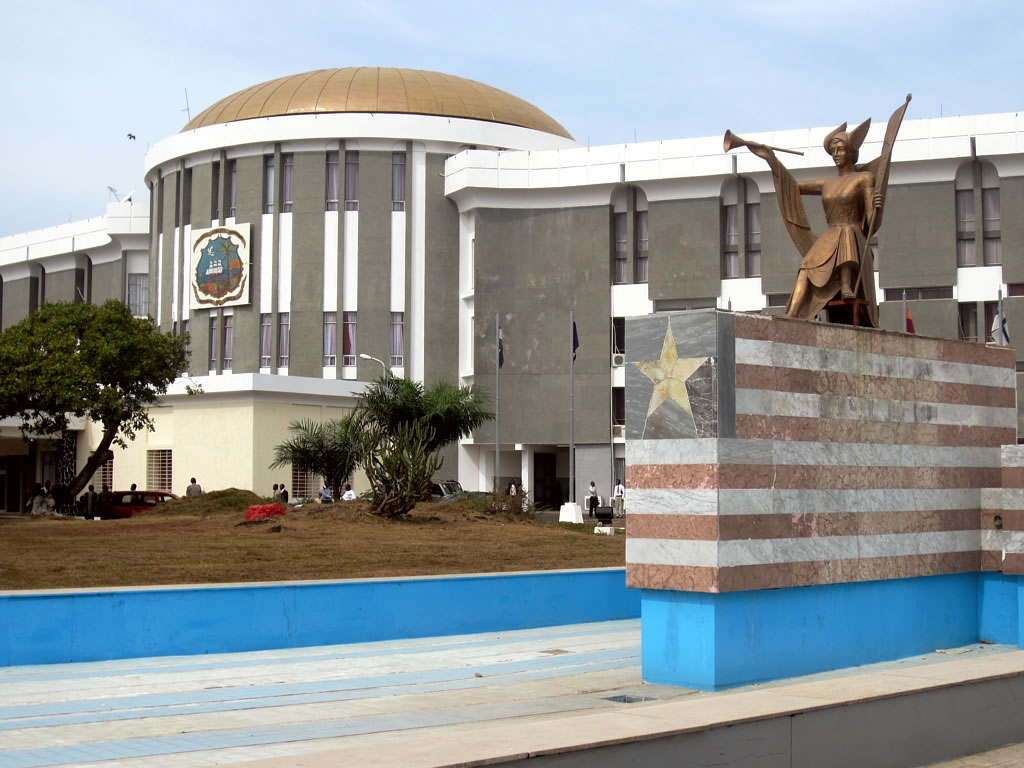
- Capitol Building, Monrovia

Website
- https://senate.gov.lr/

The Senate is the upper house of the bicameral legislative branch of Liberia, and together with the House of Representatives comprises the Legislature of Liberia. Each of the fifteen counties are equally represented by two senators, elected to serve staggered nine-year terms. The Senate meets at the Capitol Building in Monrovia.

The Senate is largely modeled on the United States Senate. The Constitution vests the legislative power of Liberia in both the Senate and the House, which must both concur on a bill prior to it being sent to the president. In addition, the Senate possesses several exclusive powers under the Constitution, including the power to advise and consent to the president's appointments to both the executive and judicial branches and the duty to try all public officials impeached by the House of Representatives.

== History ==
The Senate of Liberia, along with the House of Representatives, inherited the legislative powers of the Council of the Commonwealth of Liberia upon the country's Declaration of Independence in 1847. Modeled on the United States Senate, the Liberian Senate contained two senators from each of the country's three counties, giving it a total membership of only six senators until the formation of Grand Cape Mount County in 1856 and the annexation of the Republic of Maryland in 1857. The Senate again grew with the incorporation of four counties in 1964, and an additional four in 1984–1985. With the addition of the fifteenth county, Gbarpolu County, in 2000, the Senate reached its current membership of thirty senators.

As a result of political turmoil in Liberia during the late 20th and early 21st centuries, the Senate has been disbanded and reconstituted multiple times. Following the military coup d'état in 1980, the Senate was disbanded and several of its members executed, while its powers were vested in the People's Redemption Council. Upon the promulgation of the 1985 Constitution and subsequent 1985 general elections, the Senate was reconstituted, only to dissolve again upon the outbreak of the First Liberian Civil War in 1990. Following a peace deal that ended the war, the Senate once again sat upon the successful holding of the 1997 general elections and remained constituted throughout the Second Liberian Civil War from 1999 to 2003. The Accra Peace Accords that ended the civil war transferred the powers of the Senate to the unicameral National Transitional Legislative Assembly of Liberia for two years, after which voters elected a new Senate in the 2005 general election.

Historically, the Senate was dominated by the president's political party. From 1877 until the 1980 coup, the True Whig Party of the Americo-Liberian minority held a virtual monopoly on the national government, including almost all of the seats in the Senate. Samuel Doe's National Democratic Party of Liberia and Charles Taylor's National Patriotic Party held large majorities in the Senate during their respective presidencies. Following the 2005 general elections, which were widely considered to be the most free and fair in Liberian history, a total of nine parties won seats in the Senate. No single party won a majority of the seats, a first in Liberian political history.

== Membership ==
=== Eligibility ===
Article 30 of the Constitution sets four requirements for members of the Senate: 1) they must possess Liberian citizenship, 2) must be at least thirty years old, 3) must have been domiciled in the county which they represent for at least one year prior to their election, and 4) must be a taxpayer. Under the 1847 Constitution, senators were required to own a certain value of real estate within their county, which in effect limited the ability of indigenous citizens to be elected to the Senate. Property ownership as a requirement for election was eliminated in the current Constitution.

=== Elections ===
Article 83(b) of the 1985 Constitution originally established a two-round system for Senate elections, whereby if no candidate received a majority of the vote, a second election contested by the two candidates with the highest number of votes was held one month later. The Accra Peace Accord temporarily suspended this provision for the 2005 legislative elections, which utilized the First-past-the-post (FPTP) voting system. In 2011, Article 83(b) was amended by referendum to require FPTP voting in all future legislative elections.

=== Oath ===
The Constitution requires all senators to take an oath or affirmation upon assuming their office. The Secretary of the Senate administers the oath to all senators on their first day of sitting in the Senate. The following oath is specified by the Constitution:

I, ___ , do solemnly swear (affirm) that I will support, uphold, protect and defend the Constitution and laws of the Republic of Liberia, bear true faith and allegiance to the Republic, and will faithfully, conscientiously and impartially discharge the duties and functions of the office of Senator to the best of my ability. So help me God.

=== Term ===
Under the original 1847 Constitution, senators served a term of four years without term limits. The term length was increased to six years by constitutional amendment in 1904. The draft 1985 Constitution set the terms of senators at eight years, though the length was changed to nine years by the military government prior to its ratification.

Senatorial terms have been staggered under both constitutions, with two classes of senators being elected in alternating election years. The 2005 Senate elections reinstated this method, with each voter able to cast two ballots for separate candidates. The candidate with the highest number of votes was elected as a First Category senator, serving a nine-year term, followed by elections in 2014. The candidate with the second-highest number of votes became a Second Category senator, serving an exceptional six-year term, followed by elections in 2011 for a normal nine-year term. Since 2011 elections are staggered whereby each county elects one senator (2011–2020), then another senator three years later (2014–2023) followed by a six-year period in which no senators are elected (no half senate elections in 2017).

=== Midterm vacancies ===
In the event of a senator's death, resignation, ascension to a disqualifying office, incapacity or expulsion prior to the completion of their term, the Senate is required to notify the National Elections Commission within 30 days of the vacancy. The NEC then carries out a by-election within 90 days of such notification to fill the vacancy. Senators elected in a by-election only serve the remainder of their predecessor's term.

== Duties ==
=== Legislation ===
Bills may originate in either the House or the Senate with the exception of revenue bills, which Article 34(d)(i) requires to originate in the House. Bills originating in the House, including revenue bills, may be amended by the Senate and sent back to the House. Both chambers are required to pass the same bill in order for it to be sent to the president for signature or veto. If differences exist in the two versions passed by the House and the Senate, a conference committee made up of members of both chambers may be formed to negotiate a single bill for passage by the chambers.

=== Checks and balances ===
The Senate, along with the House, must approve any treaties or other international agreements signed by the president. Should the president veto any bill passed by the House and the Senate, the veto may be overturned by a vote of two-thirds of the members in each chamber. The Constitution also grants the Senate several exclusive powers to check the actions of the executive branch. Under Article 54, the president's appointments of ministers, judges, county officials, military officers and other officers must be confirmed by the Senate. The Senate is also responsible for trying the president, the vice president, and judges in the event that they are impeached by the House. Conviction and removal from office requires the consent of two-thirds of the senators.

== Structure ==
=== Sessions ===
The Senate holds one regular session every year, beginning on the second working Monday of January and ending on August 31, with a two-week break for Easter. Under Article 32(b) of the Constitution, the Senate, by concurrence of one-fourth of its members and one-fourth of the members of the House, or the president, on their own initiative, may extend the session past its adjournment or call for an extraordinary session outside of the regular session. Plenary sessions are held every Tuesday and Thursday, with committees meeting on Mondays and Wednesdays.

=== Leadership ===
Article 51 of the Constitution states that the vice president "shall be President of the Senate and preside over its deliberations without the right to vote, except in the case of a tie vote." In practice, the vice president rarely fulfills this role, with a president pro tempore, elected from among the senators, presiding over the Senate in the vice president's absence. Unlike the president pro tempore of the United States Senate, which is a largely ceremonial role traditionally granted to the most senior senator from the majority party, the office of President pro tempore in Liberia is heavily contested among the senators. The president pro tempore may be removed from office with the concurrence of two-thirds of the senators.

In addition to the president pro tempore, the Senate elects a Secretary of the Senate, Assistant Secretary of the Senate and a Sergeant-at-Arms as officers of the Senate, though these positions are not held by sitting senators.

=== Committees ===
Article 38 of the Constitution empowers both houses of the Legislature to create both committees and sub-committees, with the only caveat being that the Committee on Ways, Means, Finance and Budget is required to consist of one senator from each county. Each committee is headed by a chairperson, appointed by the president pro tempore. In the 52nd Legislature, the twenty-six standing committees were:

- Committee on the Executive
- Committee on Foreign Affairs
- Committee on the Judiciary, Human Rights, Claims and Petitions
- Committee on Ways, Means, Finance and Budget
- Committee on Rules, Order and Administration
- Committee on National Defense, Intelligence, Security and Veteran Affairs
- Committee on Gender Health, Social Welfare; Women and Children Affairs
- Committee on Internal Affairs and Governance
- Committee on Maritime Affairs
- Committee on Commerce, Industry and Trade
- Committee on Agriculture, Fisheries and Forestry
- Committee on Education and Public Administration
- Committee on Concessions and Investment
- Committee on Labor
- Committee on Youth and Sport
- Committee on Planning and Economic
- Committee on Public Works and Rural Development
- Committee on Lands, Mines, Energy, Mineral Resources and Environment
- Committee on Post and Telecommunications
- Committee on Information, Broadcasting, Cultural Affairs and Tourism
- Committee on Banking and Currency
- Committee on Public Accounts and Audits
- Committee on Public Corporations
- Committee on Autonomous Commissions and Agencies
- Committee on Social Security, Pension and Insurance
- Committee on Transportation

== Current members ==
County	Senior Senator	Party	Year elected	Junior Senator	Party	Year elected	Notes
Bomi	Edwin Snowe	Ind.	2020	Alex J. Tyler	Ind.	2023	
Bong	Prince K. Moye	CPP	2020	Johnny K. Kpehe	Ind.	2023	
Gbarpolu	Botoe Kanneh	Ind.	2020	Amara Mohamed Konneh	Ind.	2023	
Grand Bassa	Nyonblee Karnga-Lawrence	LP (Note: After the dissolution of the CPP, Karnga-Lawrence remained a member of the LP.)	2013	Gbehzohngar Milton Findley (Note: Findley was first elected in 2005, though lost re-election in 2014 and 2020.)	Ind.	2023	
Grand Cape Mount	Simeon Boima Taylor	CPP	2020	Dabah M. Varpilah	UP	2023	
Grand Gedeh	Zoe Emmanuel Pennue	CDC	2020	Thomas Nimely	LRP	2023	
Grand Kru	Albert Tugbe Chie	CDC	2014	Numene T. H. Bartekwa	Ind.	2020	
Lofa	Joseph Kpator Jallah	Ind.	2022	Momo T. Cyrus	Ind.	2023	
Margibi	Emmanuel J. Nuquay	PUP	2020	Nathaniel F. McGill	CDC	2023	
Maryland	J. Gbleh-bo Brown	CDC	2014	James P. Biney	CDC	2020	
Montserrado	Saah H. Joseph	CDC	2018	Abraham Darius Dillon	CPP	2019	
Nimba	Nya D. Twayen Jr.	UP	2024	Samuel G. Kogar	MDR	2025	
River Gee	Jonathan Sogbie	CPP	2020	Francis Saidy Dopoh II	Ind.	2023	
Rivercess	Wellington Geevon Smith	Ind.	2020	Bill Teah Twehway	CDC	2023	
Sinoe	Augustine S. Chea	CDC	2018	Crayton O. Duncan	CDC	2023	

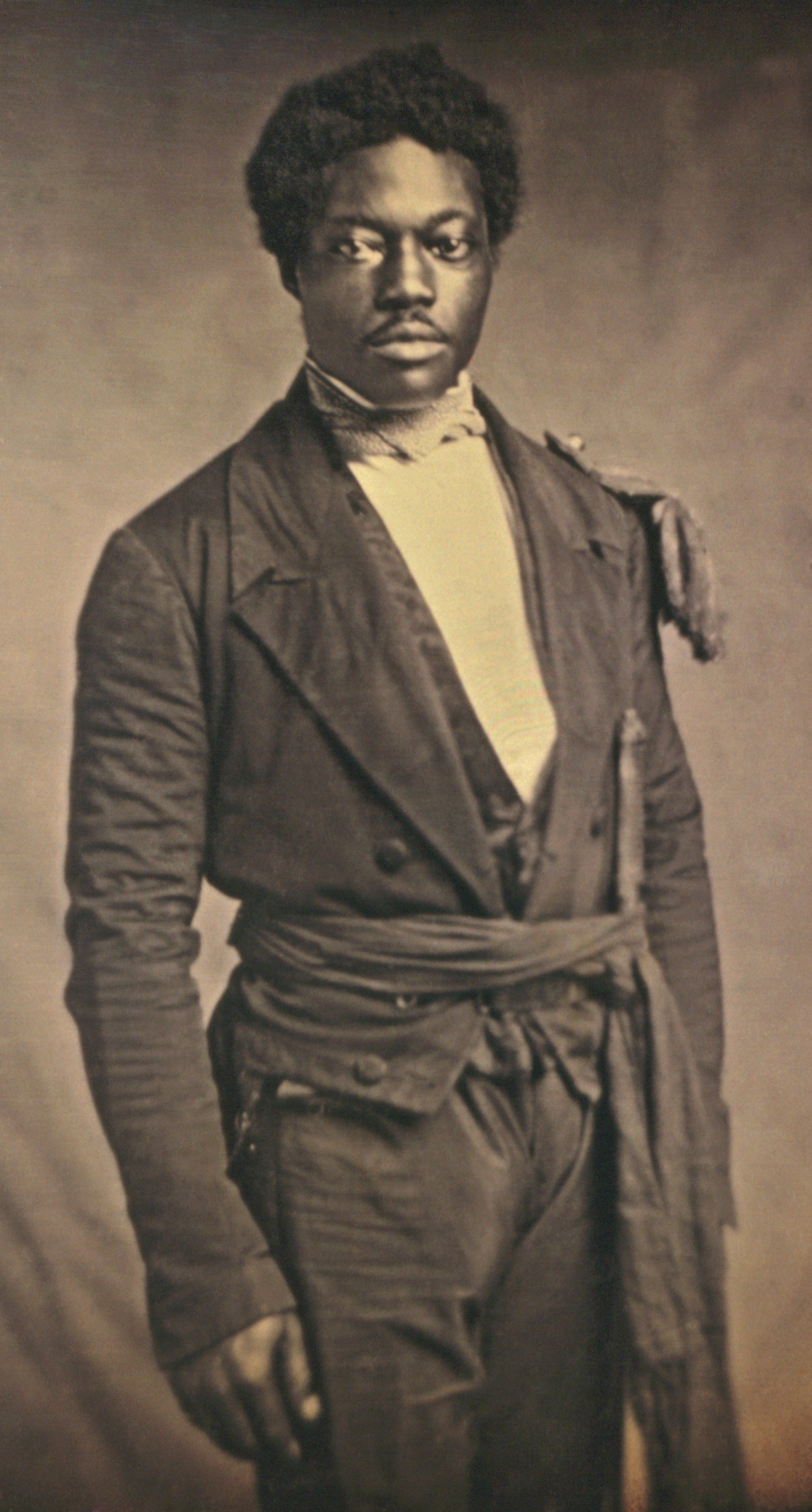
Portrait of Chancy Brown, an early sergeant-at-arms for the Senate of Liberia (made by Augustus Washington)

== See also ==
- List of senators from Bomi County
- List of senators from Bong County
- List of senators from Gbarpolu County
- List of senators from Grand Bassa County
- List of senators from Grand Cape Mount County
- List of senators from Grand Gedeh County
- List of senators from Grand Kru County
- List of senators from Lofa County
- List of senators from Margibi County
- List of senators from Maryland County
- List of senators from Montserrado County
- List of senators from Nimba County
- List of senators from River Gee County
- List of senators from Rivercess County
- List of senators from Sinoe County
