= People's Unification Party =

Political party in Liberia

People’s Unification Party
- Abbreviation: PUP
- Senate seats: 1 / 30
- House seats: 2 / 73

The People's Unification Party (PUP), also known as the Native People's Party, is a political party in Liberia.

== History ==
The PUP was established in 2014, with its founders including Margibi County Representative James Emmanuel Nuquay and Lofa County Senator Henry Yallah, and was joined by Senator Sumo Kupee after he was defeated in the Unity Party primaries.

The PUP won a single seat in the December 2014 Senate elections, with Jim Tornonlah elected in Margibi County. Senator Kupee ran for re-election under the PUP banner, but was defeated by Liberty Party candidate Stephen J. H. Zargo. Another incumbent, Rivercess County Senator Jay Jonathan Banney who was elected in 2005 with the Unity Party, was defeated National Democratic Coalition candidate Francis Paye.

From October 2016 to 15 January 2018, PUP member Rep. Nuquay served as speaker of the House of Representatives of Liberia. In the 2017 House of Representatives election, the PUP won five seats. Incumbent Haja F. Siryon, previously of the Unity Party, was re-elected to Bomi's 3rd House district with the PUP. Two other incumbents, Prince O. S. Tokpah and Samuel Kogar of Nimba County's second and fifth districts respectively, both previously of the National Union for Democratic Progress were elected with the PUP as well. Other PUP victors included Edward W. Karfia (Bong-5) and Dorwohn Twain Gleekia (Nimba-6).

In 2019, in a by-election in Grand Cape Mount County, Victor Varney Watson was elected to the Senate with the PUP. In the 2020 election, Nuquay was elected to the Senate, representing Margibi County. Incumbent Gbarpolu County Senator Armah Jallah, who was elected with the National Patriotic Party in 2011, ran with the PUP in 2020, and failed re-election. James M. Kolleh was elected under the PUP banner in Bong County's 2nd House district in a by-election in 2021.

In August 2020, the PUP elected Rep. Samuel Kogar as its national chairman. In November 2022, Kogar announced the party would not be endorsing any candidate for president in the upcoming election. In April 2023, members of the PUP, including Standard Bearer Nuquay, passed a resolution supporting incumbent President George Weah of the Coalition for Democratic Change (CDC) for re-election. The resolution was passed without the signature or presence of the chairman or members of the executive committee of the party. Chairman Kogar claimed this violated the party's constitution. Following the passing of the resolution, Kogar was suspended from the party for failure to comply with the resolution. Days afterward, Kogar filed a petition for a writ of prohibition at the Supreme Court, challenging his suspension.

The 2023 general election saw losses for the PUP in the legislature. Both representatives Siryon and Tokpah ran with the CDC and did not win re-election. Rep. Karfia did not run for re-election. Rep. Gleekia won re-election under the Movement for Democracy and Reconstruction banner. In the House, only representatives Kogar and Kolleh were re-election with the PUP. Senator Tornonlah did not run for re-election. Senator Watson ran as an independent and was not re-elected.

Rep. Kogar resigned from the PUP ahead of the 2025 Nimba County Senate by-election to join the Movement for Democracy and Reconstruction.

== Election results ==
=== Senate elections ===
Election	Votes	%	Seats	+/–	Position
2014	22,528	4.94	1 / 30	New	▲4th
2020	56,398	6.40	2 / 30	▲1	▲3rd
2023	86,466	4.77	1 / 30	▼1	▼4th

=== House of Representatives elections ===
Election	Votes	%	Seats	+/–	Position
2017	90,421	5.87	5 / 73	New	▲5th
2023	78,913	4.34	2 / 73	▼3	▼4th
