= Collaborating Political Parties =

Political alliance in Liberia

The Collaborating Political Parties (CPP) was a political alliance in Liberia. The alliance was originally formed in 2018 by four opposition political parties: the All Liberian Party (ALP), the Unity Party (UP), the Alternative National Congress (ANC), and the Liberty Party (LP). It was certified by the National Elections Commission (NEC) in 2020. By February 2022, the ALP and UP had withdrawn from the alliance. By March 2022, a large faction of the LP had left as well. In April 2024, the CPP had officially dissolved.

== History ==
The CPP was founded as early as 2018 by four opposition parties, the ALP, UP, ANC, and LP. In the 2017 general election, the parties had gathered a significant number of votes fractured between them. With a collaboration, they hoped to consolidate their electoral success under one alliance, exerting more pressure on the ruling coalition, the Coalition for Democratic Change (CDC) led by President George Weah. The leaders of the four parties signed a memorandum of understanding on February 21, 2019, establishing formal collaboration between the organizations.

In the 2019 Montserrado County by-elections, the CPP backed two candidates: the LP's Abraham Darius Dillon and the ALP's Telia Urey. Dillon contested the Senate race, while Urey contested the vacant seat in Montserrado's 15th House district. Dillon was successful, defeating CDC candidate Paulita C.C. Wie, despite Montserrado County being a CDC stronghold. Urey was defeated by CDC candidate Abu Kamara.

ALP leader, businessman Benoni Urey was the initial chairman of the CPP, serving for nearly two years. A framework document for the alliance was signed by the four parties in May 2020. ANC leader Alexander B. Cummings was elected chairman following the signing of the framework. The goal of the CPP, as outlined in the framework, was to present a single candidate to for all elections between and including the 2023 general election. On August 14, 2020, the CPP was certified by the NEC.

In the 2020 Senate election, the ruling CDC had ten losing candidates, with the CPP gaining six seats, the most of any party in that Senate election. Senator Dillon was re-elected. Other CPP winners included Nyonblee Karnga-Lawrence, Prince Moye, Brownie Samukai, and Jonathan Sogbie. The CPP also opposed the CDC-backed referendum, voted on alongside the Senate, which ultimately failed to pass. Dagbayonoh Kiah Nyanfore II of ModernGhana claimed infighting among the constituent parties cost the CPP Senate seats.

In September 2021, Benoni Urey accused Cummings of tampering with the framework document ahead of the CPP primaries. Cummings denied the allegation. UP leader Joseph Boakai joined in the accusation, along with CPP chairwoman Senator Karnga-Lawrence. Urey alleged that the three leaders, besides Cummings, were never given the original framework document. He alleged they were given a photocopy of the framework document, not the original, and that the signature page was later affixed to the original.

On December 23, 2021, the ALP Executive Committee held a meeting where they deliberated on the issue of leaving the CPP. The committee voted to withdraw from the alliance. The ALP also noted it would seek legal action in regard to the alleged tampering of the CPP framework document. On February 16, 2022, Boakai announced the withdrawal of the UP from the CPP. In March 2022, the faction of the LP under the party's Political Leader Karnga-Lawrence broke from the CPP. LP chairman Musa Bility remained loyal to the CPP. While Karnga-Lawrence's faction was larger, Bility as chairman had legal title over the party. All parties and leaders which left the CPP retained the accusation against Cummings of altering the framework document. The legal case brought against Cummings by the ALP and UP was later dropped by state prosecutors due to lack of evidence.

In August 2022, the ANC and Bility's faction of the LP approved a revised version of the framework document. Cummings was unanimously endorsed as standard bearer of the CPP. Bility was named chairman of the CPP. Cummings selected the LP's Charlyne Brumskine as his running mate in May 2023, ahead of that year's presidential election. The CPP presidential ticket won 29,613 votes, 1.61% of the total. The CPP expressed doubt in the results of the 2023 president election, calling for an examination into the matter. Instead of supporting either Weah or Boakai in the subsequent run-off election, the CPP sent a 12-point agenda to both candidates as a condition for the CPP's endorsement. The CPP saw no victories in the 2023 Senate election. In the House elections, the CPP saw six victories in total. They won the following districts: Grand Bassa-5, Grand Kru-1, Maryland-2, Montserrado-1, Nimba-2, and Nimba-7.

In April 2024, the CPP held a ceremony, officiating the dissolution of the political alliance.
