= 2020 Liberian Senate election =

- 8 December 2020

15 of the 30 seats in the Senate 15 seats needed for a majority
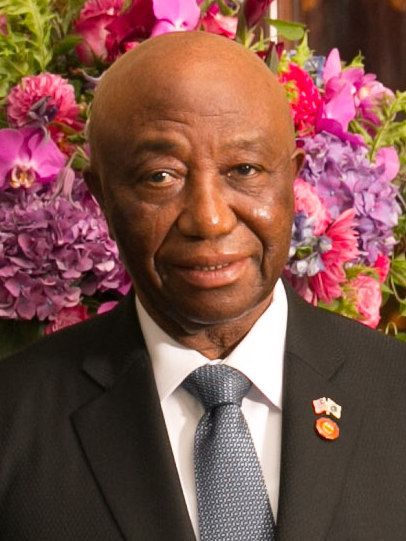

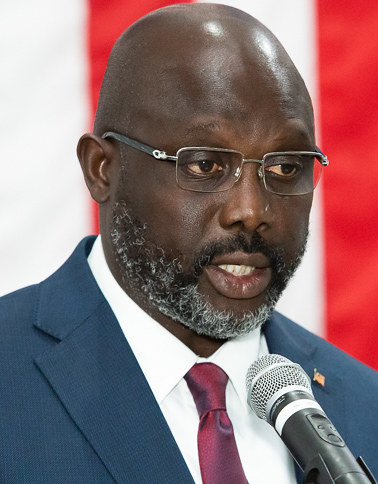
	First party	Second party	Third party
			PUP
Leader	Joseph Boakai	George Weah	Emmanuel Nuquay
Party	CPP	CDC	PUP
Seats before	11	4	1
Seats won	6	3	2
Seats after	13	5	2
Seat change	▲2	▲1	▲2
Popular vote	354,898	246,908	56,398
Percentage	40.27%	28.02%	6.40%
Swing	▲14.32pp (Note: Collaborating Political Parties is a coalition of three parties: the Alternative National Congress (ANC), the Liberty Party and the Unity Party. These parties contested separately at the last election, where they won a combined total of 25.95% of the popular vote.)	▼1.76pp	▲1.64pp
	Fourth party	Fifth party
	MDR	NDC
Party	MDR	NDC
Seats before	—	2
Seats won	1	1
Seats after	1	1
Seat change	New	▼1
Popular vote	37,899	659
Percentage	4.30%	0.07%
Swing	New	▼1.18pp

Senate elections were held in Liberia on 8 December 2020, with half the seats in the Senate up for election. The elections were held concurrently with a constitutional referendum and two House by-elections.

== Results ==
Party	Votes	%	Seats				
Party	Votes	%	Total before	Up	Won	Total after	+/–
Collaborating Political Parties	354,898	40.27	11 (Note: 8 held by the Unity Party, 2 by the Liberty Party, 1 by the Alternative National Congress.)	4 (Note: All held by the Unity Party.)	6 (Note: 4 won by the Unity Party, 2 by the Liberty Party, 1 by the Alternative National Congress and 1 by the All Liberian Party.)	13	+2
Congress for Democratic Change	246,908	28.02	4	2	3	5	+1
People's Unification Party	56,398	6.40	1	0	1	2	+1
Movement for Democracy and Reconstruction	37,899	4.30	0	0	1	1	New
All Liberia Coalition Party	9,629	1.09	0	0	0	0	New
Rainbow Alliance	9,577	1.09	0	0	0	0	New
Liberia Restoration Party	7,253	0.82	0	0	0	0	New
Liberia National Union	6,789	0.77	0	0	0	0	0
Movement for Progressive Change	6,538	0.74	0	0	0	0	0
United People's Party	5,848	0.66	0	0	0	0	0
Liberia Transformation Party	1,411	0.16	0	0	0	0	0
National Democratic Coalition	659	0.07	2	1	0	1	–1
Movement for One Liberia	131	0.01	0	0	0	0	New
National Patriotic Party			5	4	0	1	–4
National Union for Democratic Progress			1	1	0	0	–1
Alliance for Peace and Democracy			1	1	0	0	–1
Liberia Destiny Party			1	1	0	0	–1
Independents	137,251	15.58	4	1	4	7	+3
Total	881,189	100.00	30	15	15	30	0
Valid votes	881,189	95.08					
Invalid/blank votes	45,584	4.92					
Total votes	926,773	–					
Registered voters/turnout	2,476,356	37.42					

=== Results by county ===
The following are the results for the 2020 Senate elections from the National Elections Commission.

2020 Bomi County Senatorial election
Party	Candidate	Votes	%
Independent	Edwin Snowe	16,476	53.97%
CDC	Alex J. Tyler	8,834	28.94%
CPP	Sando Dazoe Johnson	2,994	9.81%
Independent	Soko Adama Dorley	1,328	4.35%
RA	Zobong Boima Norman	894	2.93%
Total votes		30,526	100.0
Rejected ballots		1,525	

2020 Bong County Senatorial election
Party	Candidate	Votes	%
CPP	Prince K. Moye	39,337	51.28%
CDC	Henry Willie Yallah	25,247	32.91%
Independent	Mogana Szorkpor Flomo Jr.	4,125	5.38%
Independent	Mohammed A. Nasser	2,904	3.79%
Independent	Dorothy Kwennah Toomann	1,682	2.19%
Independent	Adam Bill Corneh	1,468	1.91%
Independent	Menipakei Dumoe	1,012	1.32%
Independent	Benedict Kpakama Sagbeh	933	1.22%
Total votes		76,708	100.0
Rejected ballots		4,891	

2020 Gbarpolu County Senatorial election
Party	Candidate	Votes	%
Independent	Botoe Kanneh	4,955	26.2%
CDC	Alfred Gayflor Koiwood	4,498	23.78%
UPP	Boimah Quaye Taweh III	2,666	14.1%
PUP	Armah Zolu Jallah	1,967	10.4%
LINU	Paul Koulboi Kennedy	1,626	8.6%
LTP	John Kerkula Benda Sr.	1,411	7.46%
CPP	Sam Kamara Zinnah	1,164	6.15%
MPC	Allen M. Gbowee	395	2.09%
NDC	Alaric K. Tokpa	231	1.22%
Total votes		18,913	100.0
Rejected ballots		1,518	

2020 Grand Bassa County Senatorial election
Party	Candidate	Votes	%
CPP	Nyonblee Karnga-Lawrence	22,476	42.01%
CDC	Gbehzohngar Milton Findley	20,346	38.03%
Independent	Vincent S. T. Willie II	7,328	13.7%
Independent	Magdalene Magdalene Harris	1,365	2.55%
Independent	Anthony Neki Barchue	836	1.56%
Independent	Dave Llewellyn Dixon	733	1.37%
RA	Charles Paul Vah II	293	0.55%
NDC	Emmanuel Bravy Daykeay	129	0.24%
Total votes		53,506	100.0
Rejected ballots		3,385	

2020 Grand Cape Mount County Senatorial election
Party	Candidate	Votes	%
CPP	Simeon Boima Taylor	10,562	34.98%
CDC	Victor Varney Watson	8,936	29.6%
Independent	Mambu M. Sonii	5,074	16.81%
PUP	Emerson Vayomo Kamara	1,815	6.01%
Independent	Fodee Kromah	1,612	5.34%
UPP	Sando Wayne	1,471	4.87%
LRP	Siafa Gargbeh Sheriff	322	1.07%
RA	Jebeh Dakel Brown	174	0.58%
LINU	Hawa Corneh Bropleh	120	0.4%
MPC	Edwin G. K. Zoedua	107	0.35%
Total votes		30,193	100.0
Rejected ballots		1,745	

2020 Grand Gedeh County Senatorial election
Party	Candidate	Votes	%
CDC	Zoe Emmanuel Pennue Sr.	8,228	40.44%
LRP	Thomas Nimely	6,132	30.14%
Independent	William G. Nyanue	2,207	10.85%
UPP	George Saigbe Boley Sr.	1,230	6.05%
RA	Amos Zleh	696	3.42%
Independent	Beatrice Wonnah Johnson	535	2.63%
PUP	Cyrus S. Cooper II	532	2.61%
MPC	Joseph W. Geebro	519	2.55%
CPP	Felicia Flahn Doboyonnoh Duncan	267	1.31%
Total votes		20,346	100.0
Rejected ballots		1,280	

2020 Grand Kru County Senatorial election
Party	Candidate	Votes	%
Independent	Numene T. H. Bartekwa	3,679	22.83%
LINU	Nathaniel N. Bahway Sr.	3,597	22.32%
Independent	Alfred Toe Segbe	3,174	19.7%
CDC	Peter Sonpon Coleman	3,061	19.0%
CPP	Rosalind Segbe Tonne Sneh	1,026	6.37%
RA	Nicholas N. Doryen Wleh	745	4.62%
Independent	William Wiah Tuider	545	3.38%
NDC	George Toe Sieh Washington Jr.	184	1.14%
MPC	Lawrence Snor Clarke	101	0.63%
Total votes		16,112	100.0
Rejected ballots		1,561	

2020 Lofa County Senatorial election
Party	Candidate	Votes	%
CPP	Brownie Samukai	20,431	31.8%
Independent	Joseph Kpator Jallah	13,968	21.74%
ALCOP	Mariamu Beyan Fofana	9,629	14.99%
CDC	George Tamba Tengbeh	7,679	11.95%
Independent	Julie Fatorma Wiah	6,160	9.59%
Independent	Dedeh Nohr Jones	1,810	2.82%
Independent	Tamba Dabah Aghailas	1,272	1.98%
LINU	Johnny K. M. Ndebe	1,196	1.86%
RA	Abrahim M. Dukuly	940	1.46%
LRP	Gordon Nyuma Moiwula	622	0.97%
Independent	Mohamed O. Kamara	545	0.85%
Total votes		64,252	100.0
Rejected ballots		4,338	

2020 Margibi County Senatorial election
Party	Candidate	Votes	%
PUP	Emmanuel J. Nuquay	34,918	59.65%
CDC	Ivar Kokulo Jones	15,838	27.06%
Independent	Oscar A. Cooper	3,350	5.72%
Independent	Alexander Bango Collins	2,195	3.75%
CPP	Ben A. Fofana	1,227	2.1%
Independent	Gabriel Gahie Bedell Jr.	865	1.48%
MPC	Princess S. Macaulay	147	0.25%
Total votes		58,540	100.0
Rejected ballots		3,096	

2020 Maryland County Senatorial election
Party	Candidate	Votes	%
CDC	James Pobee Biney	9,630	39.4%
Independent	H. Dan Morais	5,098	20.86%
CPP	Eric Wlea Giko	3,622	14.82%
RA	Wollor Emmanuel Topor	2,609	10.67%
Independent	Isaac Blalu Roland	1,650	6.75%
Independent	John Akel Ballout Jr.	1,173	4.8%
Independent	Richard Emmanuel Wilbert Yancy	484	1.98%
LRP	William Phillip Anderson Sr.	177	72
Total votes		24,443	100.0
Rejected ballots		2,109	

2020 Montserrado County Senatorial election
Party	Candidate	Votes	%
CPP	Abraham Darius Dillon	206,368	61.3%
CDC	Thomas Pangar Fallah	120,405	35.76%
Independent	Bernard Benson Jr.	4,187	1.24%
Independent	Phil Tarpeh Dixon	2,755	0.82%
Independent	Sheikh Al-Moustapha Kouyateh	919	0.27%
Independent	Isaac Vah Tukpah	883	0.26%
Independent	Evangeline Israel King	720	0.21%
MPC	Siah Jarmie Tandanpolie	195	0.06%
MOL	Jamima K. H. Wolokolie	131	0.04%
NDC	Cecelia Siaway Teah	115	0.03%
Total votes		336,678	100.0
Rejected ballots		10,327	

2020 Nimba County Senatorial election
Party	Candidate	Votes	%
MDR	Jeremiah K. Koung	37,899	36.12%
CPP	Edith Lianue Gongloe-Weh	34,153	32.55%
PUP	Garrison Doldeh Yealue Jr.	15,607	14.87%
Independent	Taa Z. Wongbe	5,288	5.04%
Independent	Saye-Taayor Adolphus Dolo	5,147	4.91%
MPC	Thomas S. Grupee	4,973	4.74%
RA	Dorr D. Cooper	1,857	1.77%
Total votes		104,924	100.0
Rejected ballots		6,592	

2020 Rivercess County Senatorial election
Party	Candidate	Votes	%
Independent	Wellington Geevon Smith	3,302	23.34%
Independent	Steve Tequah	3,248	22.96%
CDC	Dallas A. V. Gueh	2,149	15.19%
CPP	Gabriel Buchanan Smith	2,056	14.53%
PUP	Bob Rancy Ziankahn	1,559	11.02%
RA	Janjay M. Bloh	1,001	7.08%
UPP	Winston Garpue Borbor	481	3.4%
LINU	Prince B. Brown	250	1.77%
MPC	Eddie Jarque Strother	101	0.71%
Total votes		14,147	100.0
Rejected ballots		1,014	

2020 River Gee County Senatorial election
Party	Candidate	Votes	%
CPP	Jonathan Sogbie	4,972	33.59%
CDC	Charles Korkor Bardyl	4,598	31.06%
Independent	Matthew N. Jaye	2,848	19.24%
Independent	Francis Saywon Younge	2,385	16.11%
Total votes		14,803	100.0
Rejected ballots		901	

2020 Sinoe County Senatorial election
Party	Candidate	Votes	%
CDC	Augustine S. Chea	7,459	43.62%
Independent	Thomas Romeo Quioh	5,028	29.41%
CPP	Grace Scotland-Briamah	4,243	24.82%
RA	Andy M. S. Cheeseman	368	2.15%
Total votes		17,098	100.0
Rejected ballots		1,302	

== Aftermath ==
Nathaniel Blama of the Liberian National Union (LINU) called for a rerun in the election held in Gbarpolu and Grand Kru counties because of tampering with ballots.

The Collaborating Political Parties (CPP) called for a rerun of the election in the Nimba County based on allegations of fraud.
