= 2014 Liberian Senate election =

- 20 December 2014

15 of the 30 seats in the Senate 15 seats needed for a majority
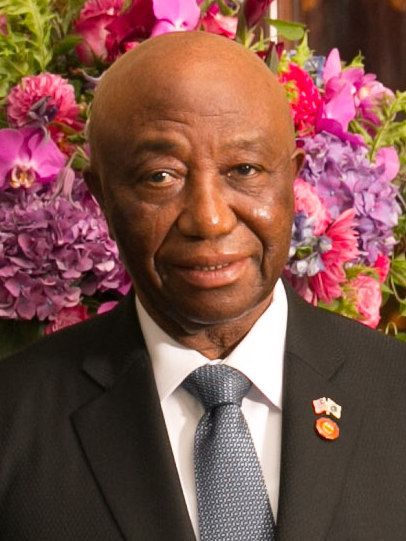

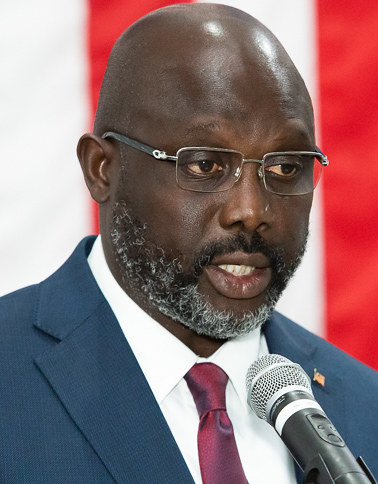
	First party	Second party	Third party
			LIB
Leader	Joseph Boakai	George Weah	Charles Brumskine
Party	UP	CDC	Liberty
Seats before	10	3	1
Seats won	4	3	2
Seats after	8	3	2
Seat change	▼2	Steady	▲1
Popular vote	47,123	135,897	52,351
Percentage	10.33%	29.78%	11.47%
Swing	▼2.52pp	▲9.58pp	▲0.23pp
	Fourth party	Fifth party	Sixth party
	NPP	PUP
Leader	Roland Massaquoi	Emmanuel Nuquay
Party	NPP	PUP	ANC
Seats before	6	—	—
Seats won	1	1	1
Seats after	1	1	1
Seat change	▼5	New	New
Popular vote	27,602	22,528	18,917
Percentage	6.05%	4.94%	4.15%
Swing	▼0.18pp	New	New
	Seventh party
	NDC
Party	NDC
Seats before	1
Seats won	1
Seats after	1
Seat change	Steady
Popular vote	5,726
Percentage	1.25%
Swing	▼2.24pp

Senate elections were held in Liberia on 20 December 2014, with half the seats in the Senate up for election.

== Background ==
The elections were originally scheduled to be held on 14 October 2014, as defined by the constitution. However, they were postponed until 16 December due to the Ebola epidemic. Shortly before 16 December, they were postponed again until 20 December.

== Campaign ==
In early December President Ellen Johnson Sirleaf banned political rallies, claiming that they could cause the Ebola virus to spread.

A total of 139 candidates ran for the 15 seats. Fourteen parties nominated candidates, with 26 people standing as independents. Among the candidates were former footballer George Weah of the Congress for Democratic Change, who won the Montserrado County election and sat in the Senate until his election as president in 2017.

== Results ==
Party	Votes	%	Seats
Congress for Democratic Change	135,897	29.78	2
Liberty Party	52,351	11.47	2
Unity Party	47,123	10.33	4
National Patriotic Party	27,602	6.05	1
People's Unification Party	22,528	4.94	1
Alternative National Congress	18,917	4.15	1
Alliance for Peace and Democracy	18,410	4.03	0
National Democratic Coalition	5,726	1.25	1
Union of Liberian Democrats	4,092	0.90	0
Liberia Transformation Party	3,680	0.81	0
Grassroot Democratic Party of Liberia	3,154	0.69	0
Movement for Progressive Change	3,038	0.67	0
Liberia National Union	1,779	0.39	0
Victory for Change Party	1,266	0.28	0
Independents	110,707	24.26	3
Total	456,270	100.00	15
Valid votes	456,270	95.07	
Invalid/blank votes	23,666	4.93	
Total votes	479,936	100.00	
Registered voters/turnout	1,903,229	25.22	

=== By county ===
The following are the results for the 2014 Senate elections from the National Elections Commission.

2014 Bomi County Senatorial election
Party	Candidate	Votes	%
UP	Morris Gato Saytumah	8,857	47.1%
NPP	Lahai Gbabye Lansanah	6,837	36.3%
Independent	Michael Abou Jones	1,318	7.0%
CDC	Duannah A. Kamara	537	2.9%
Independent	Neh Dukuly Tolbert	421	2.2%
LTP	Abraham Abraham Nyei	291	1.5%
LP	Hajah Sheri Washington	218	1.2%
Independent	Gbatokai F. M. Dakinah	145	0.8%
ANC	Frances Johnson Morris Allison	137	0.7%
MPC	Dwolu Murvee Anderson Sr.	56	0.3%
Total votes		18,817	100.0

2014 Bong County Senatorial election
Party	Candidate	Votes	%
NPP	Jewel C. Howard-Taylor	13,672	35.2%
Independent	Henrique Flomo Tokpa	11,737	30.2%
UP	Ranney Banama Jackson	4,038	10.4%
LP	Franklin Obed Siakor	2,497	6.4%
CDC	Augustus Jonathan Flomo	2,265	5.8%
GDPL	Martin Fahnlon Kerkula Sr.	1,213	3.1%
NDC	Edwin Tokpa Juah	872	2.2%
LINU	James Karpee Saybay	681	1.8%
Independent	Numehn Owen Dunbar	533	1.4%
VCP	Benedict Kpakama Sagbeh	386	1.0%
ANC	James Yarkpawolo Gbarbea Jr.	375	1.0%
LTP	Jefferson Gbaryan	342	0.9%
MPC	Mator M. F. Kpangbai	201	0.5%
Total votes		38,812	100.0

2014 Gbarpolu County Senatorial election
Party	Candidate	Votes	%
ANC	Daniel Flomo Naatehn Sr.	3,962	34.3%
UP	Gertrude Tene Lamin	1,906	16.5%
CDC	Nathaniel Farlo McGill	1,636	14.2%
APD	J. S. B. Theodore Momo Jr.	1,431	12.4%
LP	Sumoward Edwin Harris	1,241	10.7%
PUP	Fatuma Mamie Zinnah	1,159	10.0%
NDC	Alaric K. Tokpa	219	1.9%
Total votes		11,554	100.0

2014 Grand Bassa County Senatorial election
Party	Candidate	Votes	%
LP	Jonathan Lambort Kaipay	16,296	57.4%
Independent	Gbehzohngar Milton Findley	10,306	36.3%
Independent	Gabriel B. Smith	1,353	4.8%
ANC	Siokin Civicus Barsi-Giah	236	0.8%
CDC	Solomon James Murray	213	0.7%
Total votes		28,404	100.0

2014 Grand Cape Mount County Senatorial election
Party	Candidate	Votes	%
UP	Varney Sherman	13,651	61.7%
CDC	Fodee Kromah	3,431	15.5%
NPP	Abel Momodu Massalay	1,131	5.1%
ANC	Simeon Boima Taylor	1,083	4.9%
ULD	James Kormah Momo	884	4.0%
PUP	Victor Varney Watson	654	3.0%
NDC	Matthew V. Z. Darblo Sr.	582	2.6%
LP	Jesse Zinnah Segbo	440	2.0%
LTP	Mohammed Abraham Ware Sr.	181	0.8%
Independent	Elizabeth G. M. Armstrong	52	0.2%
GDPL	Henrietta Victoria Kandakai	38	0.2%
Total votes		22,127	100.0

2014 Grand Gedeh County Senatorial election
Party	Candidate	Votes	%
CDC	A. Marshall Dennis	6,148	35.9%
Independent	Zoe Emmanuel Pennue	3,273	19.1%
PUP	George Saigbe Boley Sr.	2,146	12.5%
LP	Thomas Yaya Nimely	2,109	12.3%
MPC	Charles Gaye Breeze Jr.	1,076	6.3%
Independent	Samuel Kanyon Doe Jr.	870	5.1%
NDC	George Sluwar Dweh Sr.	509	3.0%
APD	Cyrus S. Cooper II	388	2.3%
ANC	William K. Glay Sr.	221	1.3%
NPP	William Y. Glay	196	1.1%
GDPL	Cecilia K. Towah	190	1.1%
Total votes		17,126	100.0

2014 Grand Kru County Senatorial election
Party	Candidate	Votes	%
Independent	Albert Tugbe Chie	5,619	45.4%
UP	Rosalind Segbe Tonne Sneh	2,781	22.5%
Independent	Samuel E. S. Badio	1,551	12.5%
APD	Gbenimah Balu Slopadoe I	879	7.1%
MPC	Patrice Pokar Weah	611	4.9%
NDC	Amos Yonkon Bartu	576	4.7%
ANC	Joseph N. Kpanie II	362	2.9%
Total votes		12,379	100.0

2014 Lofa County Senatorial election
Party	Candidate	Votes	%
LP	Stephen J. H. Zargo	12,797	26.2%
APD	Joseph Kpator Jallah	8,554	17.5%
Independent	Alhaji G. V. Kromah	7,127	14.6%
PUP	Sumo G. Kupee	6,288	12.9%
ANC	Stanley S. Kparkillen	4,855	9.9%
CDC	Galakpai Woizee Kortimai	3,570	7.3%
UP	Francis Mazuwu Carbah	2,966	6.1%
Independent	Fomba Varlee Sannoh	1,870	3.8%
GDPL	Gladys G. Y. Beyan	785	1.6%
Total votes		48,812	100.0

2014 Margibi County Senatorial election
Party	Candidate	Votes	%
PUP	Jim Womba Tornonlah	7,893	30.5%
CDC	Ansu Dao Sonii	6,640	25.7%
NPP	Saah Richard Gbollie	2,696	10.4%
ANC	J. Stanley Nyumah	2,280	8.8%
LP	Clarice Alpha Jah	1,967	7.6%
ULD	Roland C. Kaine	1,712	6.6%
GDPL	William Garway Sharpe	928	3.6%
UP	Edna Araminta Lloyd	715	2.8%
Independent	Gabriel Gahie Bedell Jr.	349	1.3%
APD	William R. Slocum	272	1.1%
LTP	Pennoh Wreh Bestman	196	0.8%
MPC	B. Abraham F. Tengbeh	155	0.6%
NDC	John Fayah Josiah	66	0.3%
Total votes		25,869	100.0

2014 Maryland County Senatorial election
Party	Candidate	Votes	%
Independent	J. Gbleh-bo Brown	5,192	32.7%
CDC	Bhofal Chambers	5,116	32.2%
PUP	Isaac Blalu Roland	2,122	13.4%
NPP	James N. Anderson II	1,101	6.9%
UP	John A. Ballout Jr.	877	5.5%
ANC	Thomas G. Bedell	621	3.9%
ULD	Abraham Botimo Jackson	506	3.2%
LP	Roosevelt S. Kla-Fleh	339	2.1%
Total votes		15,874	100.0

2014 Montserrado County Senatorial election
Party	Candidate	Votes	%
CDC	George Weah	99,226	78.0%
Independent	Robert Alvin Sirleaf	13,692	10.8%
LP	Benjamin Robert Sanvee	4,410	3.5%
Independent	Christopher Zeohn Neyor	3,730	2.9%
LTP	Sheikh Al Moustapha Kouyateh	2,348	1.8%
LINU	Nathaniel T. Blama Sr.	1,098	0.9%
Independent	Miatta Aries Fahnbulleh	970	0.8%
UP	Ali Sylla	610	0.5%
Independent	J. Musu Freeman-Sumo	427	0.3%
Independent	Celia Cuffy-Brown	396	0.3%
PUP	James Laveli Supuwood	331	0.3%
Total votes		127,238	100.0

2014 Nimba County Senatorial election
Party	Candidate	Votes	%
Independent	Prince Johnson	37,932	66.6%
LP	Edith Lianue Gongloe-Weh	9,471	16.6%
CDC	Yamie QuiQui Gbeisay Sr.	5,941	10.4%
ANC	Peter Y. B. Weato	2,210	3.9%
NDC	Joseph D. Z. Korto	943	1.7%
NPP	John Leagar Teah	426	0.7%
Total votes		56,923	100.0

2014 Rivercess County Senatorial election
Party	Candidate	Votes	%
NDC	Francis Saturday Paye	1,959	22.8%
UP	Wellington Geevon Smith	1,278	14.9%
ANC	J. Josephus Burgess Sr.	1,010	11.7%
VCP	Bob Tompoe-Ziankahn	880	10.2%
MPC	Rosana Glaypohkpay D. H. Schaack	687	8.0%
PUP	Jay Jonathan Banney	627	7.3%
NPP	Victor Missiongar Wilson	611	7.1%
LP	D. Onesimus Banwon	566	6.6%
APD	Jerry Vogar Geedeh	441	5.1%
ULD	Emmanuel S. Toe	312	3.6%
CDC	Teplah P. Reeves	143	1.7%
Independent	Minnie Travers Tomah	82	1.0%
Total votes		8,596	100.0

2014 River Gee County Senatorial election
Party	Candidate	Votes	%
UP	Conmany Wesseh	2,672	26.1%
APD	Jonathan Boycharles Sogbie	1,719	16.8%
ANC	Daniel G. Johnson	1,565	15.3%
PUP	Charles Korkor Bardyl	1,308	12.8%
Independent	Andrew Nyenpan Saytue Sr.	1,031	10.1%
CDC	Alexander P. B. Yeaher	742	7.3%
ULD	Geetor Sarku Saydee	678	6.6%
LTP	Michael A. Cooper	322	3.1%
NPP	G. Saygbegee Davis Sr.	193	1.9%
Total votes		10,230	100.0

2014 Sinoe County Senatorial election
Party	Candidate	Votes	%
UP	Juojulue Milton Teahjay	6,772	50.1%
APD	Mobutu Vlah Nyenpan	4,726	35.0%
NPP	Delcontee Juah Wleh Sr.	739	5.5%
Independent	Michael Geegbae Mueller	427	3.2%
Independent	Oscar Jaryee Quiah	304	2.3%
CDC	Richmond Nagbe Tobii	289	2.1%
MPC	Klahn-Gboloh Jarbah	252	1.9%
Total votes		13,509	100.0
