= Unity Party (Liberia) =

Political party in Liberia

- Abbreviation: UP
- Chairperson: Luther Tarpeh
- Senate Leader: Joseph Boakai
- Founder: Edward Kesselly
- Founded: 1984
- Ideology: Christian democracy Economic liberalism
- Political position: Center
- International affiliation: International Democracy Union
- Continental affiliation: Democrat Union of Africa
- Colours: Green and maroon
- Slogan: One Nation, One People, With Liberty And Justice For All
- Seats in the Senate: 10 / 30
- Seats in the House: 25 / 73
- Pan African Parliament: 2 / 5

The Unity Party (UP) is a liberal political party in Liberia that was started in 1984 by Edward B. Kesselly, also its first standard bearer. The Unity Party was founded in Buchanan, Grand Bassa County, on 27 July 1985. The Unity Party participated in the first elections after the 1980 coup, running against President Samuel Doe in October 1985. The party has remained active in Liberian politics since and is the current ruling party following the 2023 Liberian general election.

In the elections held on 19 July 1997, the UP presidential candidate Ellen Johnson Sirleaf won 9.58% of the vote. The party won seven of 64 seats in the House of Representatives and three of 26 available in the Senate. While international observers deemed the polls administratively free and transparent, they noted that it had taken place in an atmosphere of intimidation because most voters believed that former rebel leader and National Patriotic Party (NPP) candidate Charles Taylor would return to war if defeated.

Unity Party candidate Sirleaf won the 2005 presidential elections, defeating George Weah of the Congress for Democratic Change (CDC) in a runoff. The party also won three seats in the Senate and 8 in the House of Representatives. The merger of the Liberia Unification Party and the Liberian Action Party into the Unity Party on 1 April 2009 substantially increased its representation in the Legislature.

The party lost in the runoff of the 2017 Liberian general election to ex-footballer and previous runoff candidate George Weah. On 13 January 2018, the party expelled President Ellen Johnson Sirleaf from the party for campaigning for and with Weah against her own Vice President, Joseph Boakai, who was campaigning on the party ticket.

In 2023, the party won the 2023 Liberian general election, defeating the incumbent George Weah by less than 21,000 votes—making it the closest runoff in Liberia's electoral history.

== Party Leadership ==
Former Vice President Boakai remains the Standard Bearer of the Party and was the leading opposition contender for the 2023 Presidential elections. Hon. Boakai was instrumental in the formation of the Collaborating Political Parties (CPP) that brought together the four largest opposition political parties: the All Liberian Party (ALP), the Alternative National Congress (ANC), the Liberty Party (LP), and the Unity Party (UP) to form an opposition bloc against Pres. Weah's Coalition for Democratic Change (CDC).

The Party is constitutionally led by its chairman, Amin Modad, who was elected in September 2020 with over 62% majority after defeating veteran politician Sen. Conmany Wesseh and others. Modad, a former representative to the World Trade Organization, cited his business background as evidence of his suitability for the role.

== Electoral history ==
=== Presidential elections ===
| Election | Candidate | Votes | % | Votes | % | Result |
| Election | Candidate | First round | | Second round | | Result |
|---|---|---|---|---|---|---|
| 1985 | Edward Kesselly | 57,273 | 11.04% | - | - | Lost ✗ |
| 1997 | Ellen Johnson Sirleaf | 59,557 | 9.58% | - | - | Lost ✗ |
| 2005 | Ellen Johnson Sirleaf | 192,326 | 19.75% | 478,526 | 59.40% | Won ✓ |
| 2011 | Ellen Johnson Sirleaf | 530,020 | 43.93% | 607,618 | 90.71% | Won ✓ |
| 2017 | Joseph Boakai | 446,716 | 28.76% | 457,579 | 38.46% | Lost ✗ |
| 2023 | Joseph Boakai | 796,961 | 43.44% | 814,481 | 50.64% | Won ✓ |

=== House of Representatives elections ===
| Election | Vote | % | Seats | +/– | Position |
|---|---|---|---|---|---|
| 1985 | 57,273 | 11.04% | 2 / 64 | New | ▲4th |
| 1997 | 59,557 | 9.57% | 7 / 120 | ▲1 | ▲2nd |
| 2005 | 123,373 | 12.49% | 8 / 64 | ▲1 | ▼4th |
| 2011 | 226,291 | 17.76% | 24 / 73 | ▲2 | ▲1st |
| 2017 | 220,508 | 14.32% | 20 / 73 | ▼4 | ▼2nd |
| 2023 | 237,931 | 13.09% | 11 / 73 | ▼9 | 2nd |

=== Senate elections ===
| Election | Votes | % | Seats | +/– | Position |
|---|---|---|---|---|---|
| 1985 | 57,273 | 11.04% | 1 / 26 | New | ▲4th |
| 1997 | 59,557 | 9.57% | 3 / 26 | ▲2 | ▲2nd |
| 2005 | 222,705 | 12.93% | 4 / 30 | ▲1 | 2nd |
| 2011 | 164,851 | 12.85% | 10 / 30 | ▼1 | ▲1st |
| 2014 | 47,123 | 10.33% | 8 / 30 | ▼2 | 1st |
| 2020 | 354,898 (As part of CPP) | 40.27% | 6 / 30 | ▼2 | 1st |
| 2023 | 218,138 | 12.04% | 3 / 30 | ▼3 | ▼2nd |
