= 2023 Liberian general election =

- Presidential election
- 10 October 2023 (first round); 14 November 2023 (second round)
- Turnout: 78.86% (first round); 66.12% (second round)
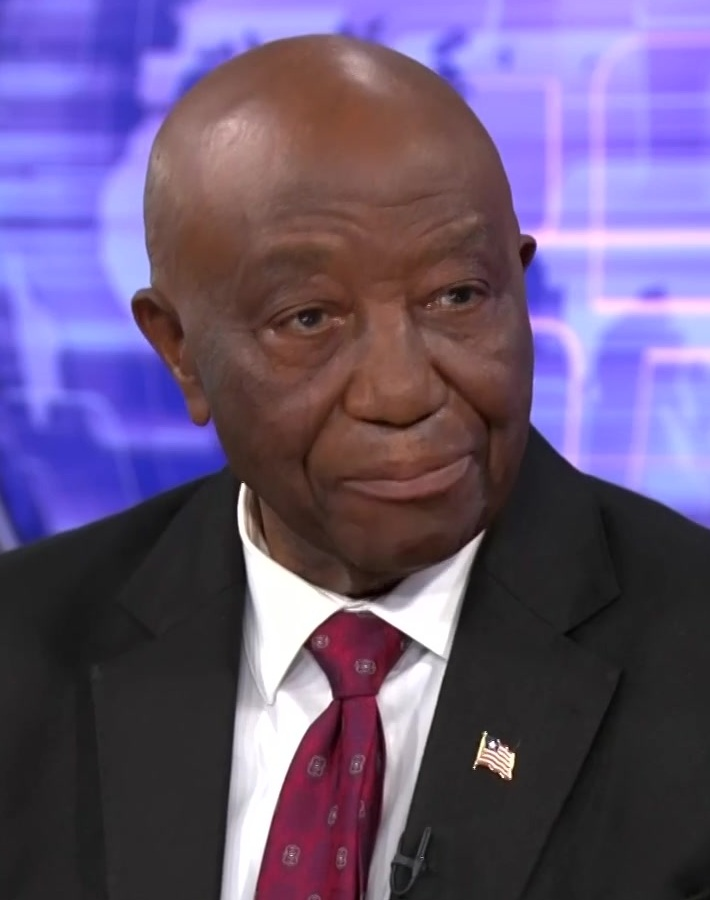

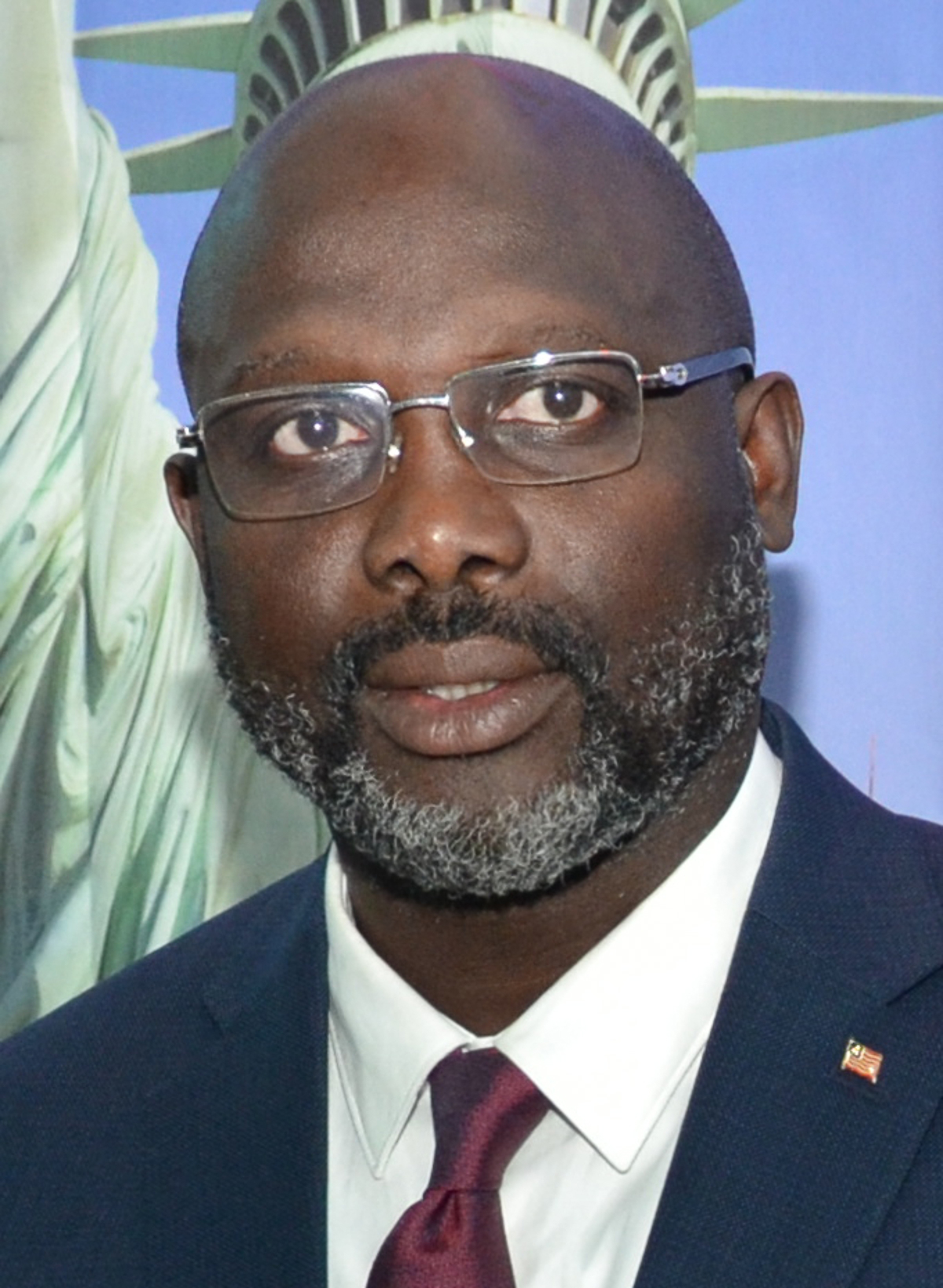
Nominee	Joseph Boakai	George Weah
Party	UP	CDC
Running mate	Jeremiah Koung	Jewel Taylor
Popular vote	814,481	793,914
Percentage	50.64%	49.36%
President before election
George Weah
CDC
Elected President
Joseph Boakai
UP
- House of Representatives election
- 10 October 2023
- All 73 seats in the House of Representatives; 37 seats needed for a majority
Party	Leader	Vote %	Seats	+/–
CDC	George Weah	22.12	25	+4
UP	Joseph Boakai	13.09	11	−9
CPP	Musa Hassan Bility	7.59	6	New
MDR	Prince Johnson	2.77	4	+2
PUP	Samuel Kogar	4.34	2	−3
ALP	Benoni Urey	2.53	1	−1
LINU	Jerome Slojue	2.32	1	0
MPC	O'neal Passawe	1.04	1	+1
NDC	Alaric K. Tokpa	1.04	1	New
VOLT	None	0.81	1	+1
LRP	Gabriel Salee	0.75	1	+1
Independents	—	25.71	19	+6
This lists parties that won seats. See the complete results below.
- Senate election
- 10 October 2023
- 15 of the 30 seats in the Senate; 15 seats needed for a majority
Party	Leader	Vote %	Seats	+/–
CDC	George Weah	34.26	6	+3
UP	Joseph Boakai	12.04	1	−3
MDR	Prince Johnson	7.09	1	+1
LRP	Gabriel Salee	1.47	1	+1
Independents	—	24.34	6	+3
This lists parties that won seats. See the complete results below.

General elections were held in Liberia on 10 October 2023 to elect the President, House of Representatives and half of the Senate. Incumbent president George Weah was eligible for a second term. No candidate won a majority in the first round, with Weah narrowly placing first over opposition leader Joseph Boakai, which meant both advanced to a runoff held on 14 November 2023. Boakai defeated Weah by just over one percentage point in the closest runoff in Liberia's history, and Weah conceded the election peacefully.

European Union observers described the runoff as remarkably close and well administered. ECOWAS and the United States congratulated Liberia on the "largely" peaceful elections.

== Background ==
Liberia has an established history of civil violence following contested elections, particularly the 1985 Liberian coup d'état attempt which was the root cause of the First Liberian Civil War. This election is also notable as it is the first election without United Nations observers since the Second Liberian Civil War. Linda Thomas Greenfield, the United States Ambassador to the United Nations, warned that the U.S. would call out anyone who undermines the electoral process through fraud, violence, or intimidation, while ECOWAS, seeking to prevent another entry in the growing West African Coup Belt, urged for calm. Additionally, ECOWAS reported that the election has sharply divided the population and urged for maturity from political leaders and a peaceful transfer of power.

Liberian voters stated that they felt "underwhelmed" by the first term of the Weah administration, calling out the poor economic state of the country going into the election as well as a slew of corruption scandals in Weah's cabinet as Liberia is still suffering from the fallout of two civil wars and an Ebola outbreak. Weah's campaign focused on the fact the Liberian economy grew by 4.8% in 2022, mostly driven by gold exports to friendly neighbors, as well as promoting a general rule of law campaign. Boakai, meanwhile, focused on the corruption scandals and youth unemployment vowing to save Liberia from "Weah's failed leadership" all while attempting to keep his age of 78 out of political discussions.

== Electoral system ==
The president is elected using the two-round system, while the 73 members of the House of Representatives are elected by first-past-the-post voting in single-member constituencies. One of the two members of the Senate from each county were also up for election via first-past-the-post voting.

== Candidates ==
Nathaniel Barnes, a former Liberian ambassador to the United States (2008–2010), announced in January his intention to run for the presidency as an independent candidate.

Clarence Moniba, the leader of the Liberia National Union, announced in January that he would run for the presidency.

Joseph Boakai, former Vice President of Liberia (2006–2018) and candidate for president in 2017, announced in January that he would run for the presidency again.

Alexander B. Cummings Jr., a former chief administrative officer of Coca-Cola (2008–2016) who finished fifth in the 2017 presidential election, announced he would run for president again as the Alternative National Congress candidate with Charlyne Brumskine as his running mate.

George Weah, incumbent president of Liberia, announced that he would seek a second term in 2023.

== Campaign ==
The election run-up and first round campaigning was generally considered fair and free by both international and domestic watchdog groups. ECOWAS's Head of Election Mission Liberia, Attahiru Jega, praised the electorate for their orderliness and decorum in casting votes. He also commended the country's politicians for the same orderliness and abiding by electoral etiquette. Jega noted that this would be the first Liberian election without the presence of United Nations election observers, with most election security being performed by domestic agencies, namely in the form of the Elections Coordinating Committee which deployed several hundred observers across the country.

However, observers from the African Union, European Union, ECOWAS, and the United States would still be present. During the course of the election, observers followed the balloting across the country and only noted a few minor incidents with the National Elections Commission (NEC) having 14 days to fully count and report all ballots. However, notably, Unity Party campaign spokesman Mohammed Ali falsely claimed that the ECOWAS observers accepted a $150,000 bribe from the CDC to compromise its neutral role as an observer; in response the Unity Party quickly denounced the statement. Meanwhile, the CDC accused the Election Coordinating Committee and its chairman Oscar Bloh of breaking its neutrality and coordinating with the Unity Party by posting a video of Bloh meeting with Unity Party senator Amara Konneh and other high ranking Unity Party members, with the ECC and Bloh denouncing the video as fabricated.

Additionally, both Unity Party and CDC activists claimed that former president, Ellen Johnson Sirleaf, and current vice-president, Jewel Taylor, respectively were traveling abroad to shore up support for an intervention to support their respective parties, however, both were in Ghana for the funeral of the late former First-Lady Theresa Kufuor. Local Voices Liberia, a local watchdog group, attributed the source of the disinformation to be sitting representative Yekeh Y. Kolubah.

On 13 November, the day before the presidential runoff, Justice Minister Frank Musah Dean issued a warning to the participating parties to not announce the results prior to the NEC, warning that doing so would result in partisan violence. However, as the first results started to be reported on 15 November high-ranking members of both the CDC and the Unity Party took to social media to announce that their parties had won the election. Among them was former Finance Minister, sitting senator from Gbarpolu County, and the Unity Party's campaign coordinator, Amara Konneh, who claimed that with 85% of the vote counted Joseph Boakai held a 40,910 vote lead. Other Unity Party figures, such as Yekeh Kolubah who took to the streets with his supporters celebrating a yet to be confirmed Boakai victory, and former warlord Joshua Milton Blahyi promised "retaliation" against the CDC now that they no longer held the presidency, claiming that the CDC supported political violence. Members of the CDC also claimed premature victory, namely CDC secretary-general Jefferson Koijee, who took to the streets with supporters a few hours after polls closed to celebrate.

Additionally, the West African Elders Forum Mission to Liberia and the Angie Brooks International Center also called for calm denouncing premature victory claims and urging against political violence.

By 17 November, the vast majority of the run-off election ballots had been counted, suggesting Weah had lost re-election by a slim margin and that Boakai had won. However, it was announced that the election would need to be re-held in Nimba County on 18 November, after it was revealed one polling station had a greater number of cast ballots than the number of registered voters. Regardless, Weah officially conceded the election to Boakai earlier in the morning on the 18th.

== Results ==
=== President ===
No candidate won a majority in the first round, with Weah narrowly placing first over opposition leader Joseph Boakai, which meant both advanced to a runoff held on 14 November 2023.

Boakai defeated Weah 51% to 49% in the closest runoff in Liberia's electoral history.

Candidate	Running mate	Party	First round		Second round	
Candidate	Running mate	Party	Votes	%	Votes	%
George Weah	Jewel Taylor	Coalition for Democratic Change	804,087	43.83	793,914	49.36
Joseph Boakai	Jeremiah Koung	Unity Party	796,961	43.44	814,481	50.64
Edward W. Appleton	Alex Gontee	Grassroots Development Movement	40,271	2.20		
Lusinee Kamara	Matthew Darblo	All Liberia Coalition Party	35,988	1.96		
Alexander B. Cummings Jr.	Charlyne Brumskine	Collaborating Political Parties	29,613	1.61		
Tiawan Saye Gongloe	Emmanuel Yarkpawolo	Liberian People's Party	26,394	1.44		
Allen R. Brown Jr.	Noosevett Weah	Liberia Restoration Party	15,607	0.85		
Simeon Freeman	James Barclay	Movement for Progressive Change	13,205	0.72		
William Wiah Tuider	Jonah Dumoe	Democratic National Allegiance	11,184	0.61		
Joshua Tom Turner	Somah Paygai	New Liberia Party	9,813	0.53		
Jeremiah Whapoe	Erasmus Fahnbulleh	Vision for Liberia Transformation	9,149	0.50		
Luther Yorfee	Juvenal Pearson	Liberia Rebuilding Party	6,479	0.35		
Bendu Kromah	Thomas Kruah	Independent	5,991	0.33		
Clarence Moniba	Grace-Tee Kpaan	Liberia National Union	5,298	0.29		
Sherikh Kouyateh	Max Vargbelee	Liberia First Movement	5,100	0.28		
David Kiamu	Annie Tuazama	Democratic People's Party of Liberia	5,086	0.28		
Alexander Kollie	Grace Yuan	Reformers National Congress	4,398	0.24		
Sara Beysolow Nyanti	Simeon Moribah	African Liberation League	3,644	0.20		
Robert Franz Morris	Celia Brown	Independent	3,363	0.18		
Richard Saye Miller	Emike Slawon	Liberian for Prosperity Party	2,885	0.16		
Total			1,834,516	100.00	1,608,395	100.00
Valid votes			1,834,516	94.12	1,608,395	98.42
Invalid/blank votes			114,639	5.88	25,788	1.58
Total votes			1,949,155	100.00	1,634,183	100.00
Registered voters/turnout			2,471,617	78.86	2,471,617	66.12

=== House of Representatives ===
Party	Votes	%	Seats	+/–
Coalition for Democratic Change	401,921	22.12	25	+4
Unity Party	237,931	13.09	11	−9
Collaborating Political Parties (ANC–LP)	137,909	7.59	6	New
People's Unification Party	78,913	4.34	2	−3
Movement for Democracy and Reconstruction	50,408	2.77	4	+2
All Liberian Party	45,886	2.53	1	−2
Liberia National Union	42,179	2.32	1	0
Movement for One Liberia	38,884	2.14	0	New
Liberian People's Party	35,400	1.95	0	−1
National Development Party	32,202	1.77	0	New
Economic Freedom Fighters of Liberia	26,102	1.44	0	New
All Liberia Coalition Party	23,436	1.29	0	New
African Liberation League	20,562	1.13	0	New
Liberia Transformation Party	19,087	1.05	0	−1
Democratic National Allegiance	18,959	1.04	0	New
Movement for Progressive Change	18,946	1.04	1	+1
National Democratic Coalition	18,768	1.03	1	New
Vision for Liberia Transformation	14,641	0.81	1	+1
United Independent Democrats	14,393	0.79	0	New
Liberia Restoration Party	13,604	0.75	1	+1
New Liberia Party	10,057	0.55	0	0
Democratic People's Party of Liberia	9,850	0.54	0	New
Liberia Rebuilding Party	9,768	0.54	0	New
Liberia First Movement	8,608	0.47	0	New
Rainbow Alliance (TWP−VCP)	8,574	0.47	0	New
Liberian for Prosperity Party	4,499	0.25	0	New
Reformers National Congress	3,116	0.17	0	New
African Democratic Movement of Liberia	2,303	0.13	0	New
All Liberians Solidarity Party	1,940	0.11	0	New
Greater Action Party of Liberia	831	0.05	0	New
Grassroots Development Movement	228	0.01	0	New
Independents	467,105	25.71	19	+6
Total	1,817,010	100.00	73	0
Valid votes	1,817,010	94.10		
Invalid/blank votes	113,962	5.90		
Total votes	1,930,972	100.00		
Registered voters/turnout	2,471,617	78.13		

=== Senate ===
Party	Votes	%	Seats				
Party	Votes	%	Total before	Up	Won	Total after	+/−
Coalition for Democratic Change	620,892	34.26	6 (Note: 5 held by the Congress for Democratic Change, 1 by the National Patriotic Party.)	3 (Note: 2 held by the Congress for Democratic Change, 1 by the National Patriotic Party.)	6	9	+3
Unity Party	218,138	12.04	6	4	1	3	−3
Movement for Democracy and Reconstruction	128,437	7.09	1	0	1	2	+1
People's Unification Party	86,466	4.77	2	1	0	1	−1
Collaborating Political Parties (ANC–LP)	83,423	4.60	6 (Note: 4 held by the Liberty Party, 2 by the Alternative National Congress.)	3 (Note: 2 held by the Liberty Party, 1 by the Alternative National Congress.)	0	3	−3
Liberia National Union	41,681	2.30	0	0	0	0	0
Liberian People's Party	39,718	2.19	0	0	0	0	0
United Independent Democrats	30,149	1.66	0	0	0	0	New
All Liberia Coalition Party	29,362	1.62	0	0	0	0	0
Liberia Restoration Party	26,575	1.47	0	0	1	1	+1
All Liberian Party	14,121	0.78	1	0	0	1	0
National Development Party	7,077	0.39	0	0	0	0	New
Economic Freedom Fighters of Liberia	6,590	0.36	0	0	0	0	New
Rainbow Alliance (TWP−VCP)	6,552	0.36	0	0	0	0	0
Movement for One Liberia	5,823	0.32	0	0	0	0	0
Democratic National Allegiance	5,206	0.29	0	0	0	0	New
All Liberians Solidarity Party	3,764	0.21	0	0	0	0	New
Vision for Liberia Transformation	3,609	0.20	0	0	0	0	0
New Liberia Party	3,425	0.19	0	0	0	0	0
Liberia Transformation Party	2,881	0.16	0	0	0	0	0
National Democratic Coalition	2,443	0.13	1	1	0	0	−1
Greater Action Party of Liberia	2,120	0.12	0	0	0	0	New
Movement for Progressive Change	2,046	0.11	0	0	0	0	0
Liberia Rebuilding Party	664	0.04	0	0	0	0	New
Independents	441,001	24.34	7	3	6	10	+3
Total	1,812,163	100.00	30	15	15	30	0
Valid votes	1,812,163	93.37					
Invalid/blank votes	128,694	6.63					
Total votes	1,940,857	100.00					
Registered voters/turnout	2,471,617	78.53					

=== Senate election results by county ===
The following are the results for the 2023 Senate elections from the National Elections Commission.

2023 Bomi County Senatorial election
Party	Candidate	Votes	%
Independent	Alex J. Tyler	16,509	34.46%
Independent	Soko Adama Dorley	14,940	31.19%
Independent	Morris G. Saytumah	7,690	16.05%
Independent	Duannah A. Kamara	6,789	14.17%
MOL	Murphy M. Gibson	1,979	4.13%
Total votes		47,907	100.0
Rejected ballots		2,603	

2023 Bong County Senatorial election
Party	Candidate	Votes	%
Independent	Johnny K. Kpehe	78,122	44.11%
PUP	Edward W. Karfiah	56,015	31.63%
ALP	Mohammed A. Nasser	10,382	5.86%
NDP	Mogana Szorkpor Flomo	7,077	4.0%
RA	Ranney B. Jackson	6,552	3.7%
ALCOP	Amos D. S. Barbu Jr.	5,698	3.22%
LRP	Pinky Suawah Bemah	4,233	2.39%
UP	Henrique F. Tokpa	4,034	2.28%
LTP	Bright Fahnlon Sackie	2,881	1.63%
GAPL	J. Alexander Zogbaye	2,120	1.2%
Total votes		177,114	100.0
Rejected ballots		14,587	

2023 Gbarpolu County Senatorial election
Party	Candidate	Votes	%
Independent	Amara Mohammed Konneh	11,651	31.13%
CDC	Alfred G. Koiwood	9,303	24.85%
LINU	Paul K. Kennedy	5,095	13.61%
LRP	John K. Benda Sr.	4,029	10.76%
MOL	Fatuma Z. Browne	3,844	10.27%
LPP	Mohammed A. Dukuly	2,210	5.9%
MPC	Allen M. Gbowee	765	2.04%
NDC	Cole Sumo Payne	535	1.43%
CPP	Daniel Naatehn (Note: Naatehn died before the 2023 election.)	0	0.0%
Total votes		37,432	100.0
Rejected ballots		2,243	

2023 Grand Bassa County Senatorial election
Party	Candidate	Votes	%
Independent	Gbehzohngar Milton Findley	55,629	52.24%
CDC	Janjay Baikpeh	25,384	23.84%
Independent	Magdalene G. Harris	12,396	11.64%
Independent	Jonathan L. Kaipay	9,338	8.77%
ALP	Jeremy G. Russell	3,739	3.51%
Total votes		106,486	100.0
Rejected ballots		9,556	

2023 Grand Cape Mount County Senatorial election
Party	Candidate	Votes	%
UP	Dabah M. Varpilah	12,465	20.4%
Independent	Victor Varney Watson	10,381	16.99%
CDC	Mambu M. Sonii	9,128	14.94%
UID	Hanson S. Kiazolu	8,250	13.5%
Independent	Varney Sherman	7,142	11.69%
Independent	Gayah W. Fahnbulleh	6,677	10.93%
EFFL	Sando Wayne	3,121	5.11%
LPP	Lyndon G. Mabande	1,855	3.04%
PUP	Daogogoe H. Fahnbulleh	832	1.36%
ALCOP	Morris Salia Nyei	648	1.06%
MPC	Edwin G. K. Zoedua	598	0.98%
Total votes		61,097	100.0
Rejected ballots		3,716	

2023 Grand Gedeh County Senatorial election
Party	Candidate	Votes	%
LRP	Thomas Nimely	18,313	41.44%
CDC	A. Marshall Dennis	11,891	26.91%
UP	Alex Chersia Grant	7,977	18.05%
CPP	Cyrus S. Cooper II	4,118	9.32%
LINU	William Y. Glay	1,892	4.28%
Total votes		44,191	100.0
Rejected ballots		2,786	

2023 Grand Kru County Senatorial election
Party	Candidate	Votes	%
CDC	Albert Tugbe Chie	25,861	82.55%
CPP	Vincent Toe Doe	5,465	17.45%
Total votes		31,326	100.0
Rejected ballots		1,886	

2023 Lofa County Senatorial election
Party	Candidate	Votes	%
Independent	Momo T. Cyrus	37,621	28.49%
CDC	Moses Y. Kollie	37,200	28.17%
Independent	Galakpai W. Kortimai	26,849	20.33%
UP	Stephen J. H. Zargo	15,862	12.01%
ALCOP	Mohamed O. Kamara	6,403	4.85%
DNA	Joseph T. Machulay Sr.	4,354	3.3%
ALSOP	Mohamed M. J. Menssalay	3,764	2.85%
Total votes		132,053	100.0
Rejected ballots		6,553	

2023 Margibi County Senatorial election
Party	Candidate	Votes	%
CDC	Nathaniel F. McGill	52,934	39.89%
PUP	J. Yarpuyah Yarkpawolo	24,404	18.39%
UP	Ballah G. Zayzay	23,506	17.71%
Independent	Emmanuel J. Giddings	9,424	7.1%
Independent	Joshua V. Robinson	8,701	6.56%
CPP	Clarice Alpha Jah	6,863	5.17%
EFFL	Emmanuel D. Gonquoi	3,469	2.61%
LPP	Vandalark R. F. Patricks	3,412	2.57%
Total votes		132,713	100.0
Rejected ballots		9,939	

2023 Maryland County Senatorial election
Party	Candidate	Votes	%
CDC	J. Gbleh-Bo Brown	12,729	25.61%
LINU	Wollor E. Topor	11,618	23.37%
Independent	J. Tiah Nagbe	9,125	18.36%
CPP	H. Dan Morais	8,217	16.53%
Independent	Eric Wlea Giko	4,523	9.1%
Independent	Henrique B. Wilson	2,042	4.11%
NLP	William Phillip Anderson	768	1.55%
MPC	Jennifer K. Henshaw	683	1.37%
Total votes		49,705	100.0
Rejected ballots		3,686	

2023 Montserrado County Senatorial election
Party	Candidate	Votes	%
CDC	Saah Hardy Joseph	375,392	56.45%
UP	Wilmot J. M. Paye	152,040	22.86%
CPP	Victoria Torlo Koiquah	50,292	7.56%
LINU	Chernor M. Jalloh	23,076	3.47%
UID	Ayouba S. Sheriff	21,899	3.29%
LPP	Saye M. Boyou	19,571	2.94%
Independent	Saranfoday Kanneh	11,714	1.76%
ALCOP	Idrissa Kaba	11,039	1.66%
Total votes		665,023	100.0
Rejected ballots		51,001	

2023 Nimba County Senatorial election
Party	Candidate	Votes	%
MDR	Prince Johnson	128,437	54.92%
Independent	Nya D. Twayen Jr.	56,651	24.23%
CDC	Roland G. Duo	20,015	8.56%
LPP	James D. Hallowanger	10,931	4.67%
Independent	Armstrong Gobac Selekpoh	8,626	3.69%
ALCOP	Lawrenso Paye Korquoi	5,574	2.38%
VOLT	Wuo Garbie Sokpah	3,609	1.54%
Total votes		233,843	100.0
Rejected ballots		14,066	

2023 Rivercess County Senatorial election
Party	Candidate	Votes	%
CDC	Bill Teah Twehway	12,780	47.89%
CPP	Gabriel B. Smith	8,468	31.73%
NLP	Emmanuel Sear Toe	2,657	9.96%
NDC	Francis S. Paye	1,908	7.15%
LPP	Jay Jonathan Banney	875	3.28%
Total votes		26,688	100.0
Rejected ballots		2,149	

2023 River Gee County Senatorial election
Party	Candidate	Votes	%
Independent	Francis Saidy Dopoh II	10,104	36.4%
CDC	Charles K. Bardyl	7,805	28.12%
PUP	Francis Saywon Younge	5,215	18.79%
UP	Conmany Wesseh	2,254	8.12%
LPP	Gbaye K. Synyenlentu	864	3.11%
DNA	Chelle S. Noring	852	3.07%
REBUILDERS	Commany B. W. Pah Sr.	664	2.39%
Total votes		27,758	100.0
Rejected ballots		1,886	

2023 Sinoe County Senatorial election
Party	Candidate	Votes	%
CDC	Crayton O. Duncan	20,470	52.72%
Independent	J. Milton Teahjay	11,168	28.76%
Independent	Matthew Gee Zarzar	7,189	18.52%
Total votes		38,827	100.0
Rejected ballots		2,037	

== Aftermath ==
Incumbent president Weah conceded the election peacefully.

President-elect Boakai in his victory speech promised to form a government of inclusion that reflects the political, social and religious diversity of the citizens.

=== Car-ramming incident ===
As crowds gathered at the Unity Party headquarters in Monrovia to celebrate Boakai's victory on 20 November, they were rammed by a jeep without license plates, killing three people and injuring 17. The driver, who had switched off the vehicle's lights prior to the incident, fled the scene while the vehicle was set on fire by angry onlookers. While police said the incident was accidental, the Unity Party called it an "act of terrorism" and cancelled upcoming celebrations until further notice. The outgoing government called on the public "to refrain from making unsubstantiated claims about the incident," citing the potential for post-election violence.

=== International reactions ===
European Union observers described the runoff as remarkably close and well administered, saying; "the conduct of the voting process in observed polling stations as very good". EU observers further added the campaign was largely peaceful and quiet. EU observers concluded political freedoms of candidates and supporters were largely respected, but the use of state resources by the ruling party distorted the level playing field.

ECOWAS also congratulated all stakeholders on the "largely" peaceful elections, although it noted isolated incidents in the counties of Lofa, Nimba, Bong and Montserrado, which resulted in "injuries and hospitalisation".

The United States congratulated Liberia on holding a peaceful presidential runoff election. United States Department of State spokesman Matthew Miller said in a statement; "it notes the broad participation of Liberians across the country and applauded the commitment and dedication of Liberian citizens in exercising their right to vote and in engaging in the electoral process peacefully."

== See also ==
- 2024 Liberian by-elections
