= Margibi-3 =

Electoral district in Liberia

- Constituency for the House of Representatives of Liberia
- Electorate: 30,547 (2023)

Current constituency
- Representative: Ellen Amarkai Attoh-Wreh

Margibi-3 is an electoral district for the elections to the House of Representatives of Liberia. It is located in a central portion of Margibi County, bordering Montserrado and Grand Bassa counties.

== Elected representatives ==
Year	Representative elected	Party	Notes
2005	Saah Richarid Gbollie	NPP	
2011	Stephen S. Kafi Jr.	IND	
2017	Ellen Amarkai Attoh	LPP	
2023	Ellen Amarkai Attoh-Wreh	IND	

== Election results ==
2005 Margibi County's 3rd House District Election
Candidate	Party	Votes	%
Saah Richarid Gbollie	National Patriotic Party	4,472	27.53
Henry Zayzay Mulbah	Free Democratic Party	3,369	20.74
Doppa Dormou Howison	Coalition for the Transformation of Liberia	2,322	14.29
Dorothy Ben Everett	Unity Party	1,746	10.75
Moses Flomo Tunnie	Liberty Party	1,403	8.64
Ida Bouyonor-Swen Collins	National Democratic Party of Liberia	1,174	7.23
Chippaye Martha Parker	Congress for Democratic Change	1,035	6.37
William G. Roberts	New Deal Movement	464	2.86
Lahai B. Parker	National Reformation Party	261	1.61
Total		16,246	100.00
Valid votes		16,246	93.69
Invalid/blank votes		1,095	6.31
Total votes		17,341	100.00

2011 Margibi County's 3rd House District Election
Candidate	Party	Votes	%
Stephen S. Kafi Jr.	Independent	4,577	29.98
Prince Anything Wreh	Independent	2,479	16.24
Kollie Sorsor Jollie	Congress for Democratic Change	1,739	11.39
Victoria Worlobah Duncan	Unity Party	1,481	9.70
Joseph Ngobeh Kaiheyah	Union of Liberian Democrats	778	5.10
Austin Sumo Natee	Liberia Empowerment Party	712	4.66
G. Martin Togbah	Independent	675	4.42
John Kollie Korvah	National Democratic Coalition	673	4.41
Emmanuel Garshua Sackor	Liberia Transformation Party	580	3.80
Anthony Topy Merchant Sr.	Independent	452	2.96
Elizabeth Saybah Kokulo	Liberia Restoration Party	430	2.82
Momo Varmuyah Corneh	Liberty Party	367	2.40
Teney Gleakai Troplue	National Union for Democratic Progress	322	2.11
Total		15,265	100.00
Valid votes		15,265	93.61
Invalid/blank votes		1,042	6.39
Total votes		16,307	100.00

2017 Margibi County's 3rd House District Election
Candidate	Party	Votes	%
Ellen Amarkai Attoh	Liberian People's Party	6,335	34.46
Stephen S. Kafi Jr. (Incumbent)	People's Unification Party	4,139	22.52
Sandy Saye Johnson	Liberty Party	1,693	9.21
Alexander Tarnue Gayflor	Coalition for Liberia's Progress	1,094	5.95
Joseph Siaffa Phillips II	All Liberian Party	920	5.00
Jerry Varnie	Coalition for Democratic Change	888	4.83
Henry Saah Fallah	Vision for Liberia Transformation	595	3.24
Kollie S. Jallah	Movement for Democracy and Reconstruction	547	2.98
Blama Fofie Nyei	Movement for Economic Empowerment	440	2.39
Foday George Faisu Jr.	True Whig Party	349	1.90
Nicholas F. Harris	Liberia Transformation Party	338	1.84
P. Blama M. Siryon	Alternative National Congress	294	1.60
Elijah Nagba Moibah	United People's Party	223	1.21
Teney Gleakia Torplue	Movement for Progressive Change	219	1.19
Chris N. M. Kaleebay	Grassroot Democratic Party of Liberia	180	0.98
Momo Varmuya Corneh	Democratic Justice Party	129	0.70
Total		18,383	100.00
Valid votes		18,383	94.89
Invalid/blank votes		989	5.11
Total votes		19,372	100.00
