= Bong-6 =

Electoral district in Liberia

- Constituency for the House of Representatives of Liberia
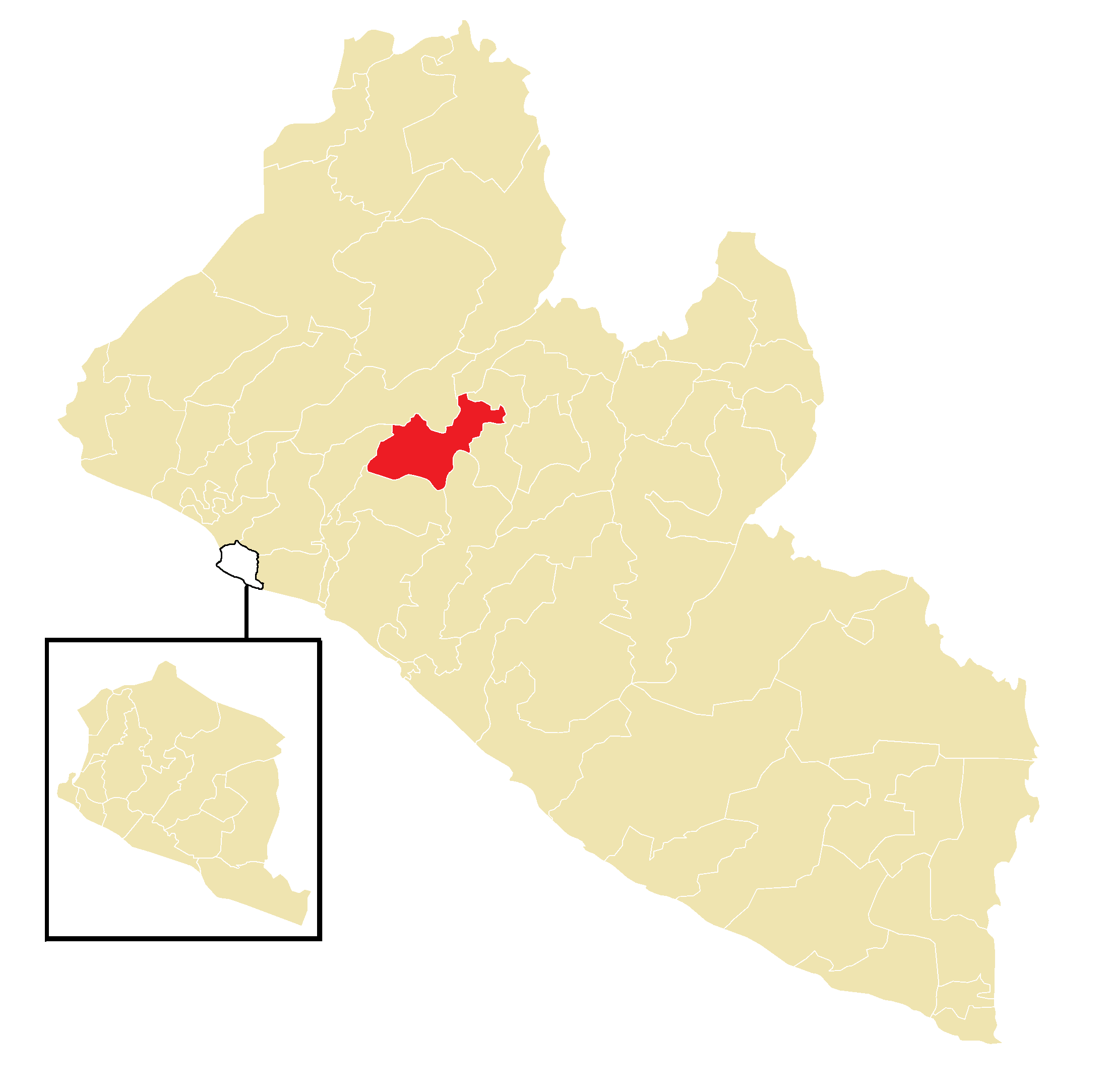
- Electorate: 30,930 (2023)

Current constituency
- Created: 2011
- Representative: Moima Briggs Mensah

Bong-6 is an electoral district for the elections to the House of Representatives of Liberia. The constituency covers Salala District and four communities of Yeallequelleh District (i.e. Gborkornemah, Zeansue, Tarsiah and Gbondoi).

== Elected representatives ==
Year	Representative elected	Party	Notes
2005	Edwin Tokpa Juah	NDM	
2011	Adam Bill Corneh	NPP	
2017	Moima Briggs Mensah	Ind.	
2023	Moima Briggs Mensah	Ind.	

== Election results ==
2005 Bong County's 6th House District Election
Candidate	Party	Votes	%
Edwin Tokpa Juah	New Deal Movement	4,214	28.88
James C. R. Flomo	Coalition for the Transformation of Liberia	2,879	19.73
Dallamah Joseph Sulonteh	Liberty Party	2,311	15.84
Mogana Szorkpor Flomo Sr.	Congress for Democratic Change	2,217	15.20
Susannah Lorpu Mator	Alliance for Peace and Democracy	2,142	14.68
Estelle K. Liberty	Unity Party	826	5.66
Total		14,589	100.00
Valid votes		14,589	90.79
Invalid/blank votes		1,480	9.21
Total votes		16,069	100.00

2011 Bong County's 6th House District Election
Candidate	Party	Votes	%
Adam Bill Corneh	National Patriotic Party	4,654	27.22
Molley Augustus Briggs	National Democratic Coalition	2,564	15.00
Selena Polson Mappy	Unity Party	2,482	14.52
Joseph Orendor Clinton	Union of Liberian Democrats	2,418	14.14
Martin Fahnlon Kerkula Sr.	Movement for Progressive Change	1,972	11.53
Silas K. Tokpa	Liberty Party	1,539	9.00
Wilson Jutonu Boykai	Liberia Transformation Party	781	4.57
Mammie Gooding	Freedom Alliance Party of Liberia	689	4.03
Total		17,099	100.00
Valid votes		17,099	92.10
Invalid/blank votes		1,467	7.90
Total votes		18,566	100.00

2017 Bong County's 6th House District Election
Candidate	Party	Votes	%
Moima Briggs Mensah	Independent	6,210	32.49
Selena Polson Mappy	Coalition for Liberia's Progress	4,683	24.50
David E. Norkoi	People's Unification Party	2,586	13.53
Adam Bill Corneh (Incumbent)	Coalition for Democratic Change	1,279	6.69
Andrew B. Quiqui	All Liberian Party	887	4.64
M. Freeman-Weah	Movement for Economic Empowerment	669	3.50
Allen B. Sumo	Alternative National Congress	586	3.07
Jutonue Abraham Kollie	True Whig Party	413	2.16
Emmanuel B. Brooks	Liberia Restoration Party	396	2.07
Moses S. Vuku	Liberian People's Party	392	2.05
Aaron S. Wennie	Redemption Democratic Congress	384	2.01
Silas Kerkula Tokpa	Unity Party	240	1.26
Joseph Lee Rogers	Liberty Party	145	0.76
J. Billy Joss	Liberia National Union	107	0.56
John Seyaker Simpson	Movement for Progressive Change	70	0.37
James J. Mal Sulonteh	United People's Party	69	0.36
Total		19,116	100.00
Valid votes		19,116	93.70
Invalid/blank votes		1,286	6.30
Total votes		20,402	100.00
