= Lofa-4 =

Electoral district in Liberia

- Constituency for the House of Representatives of Liberia
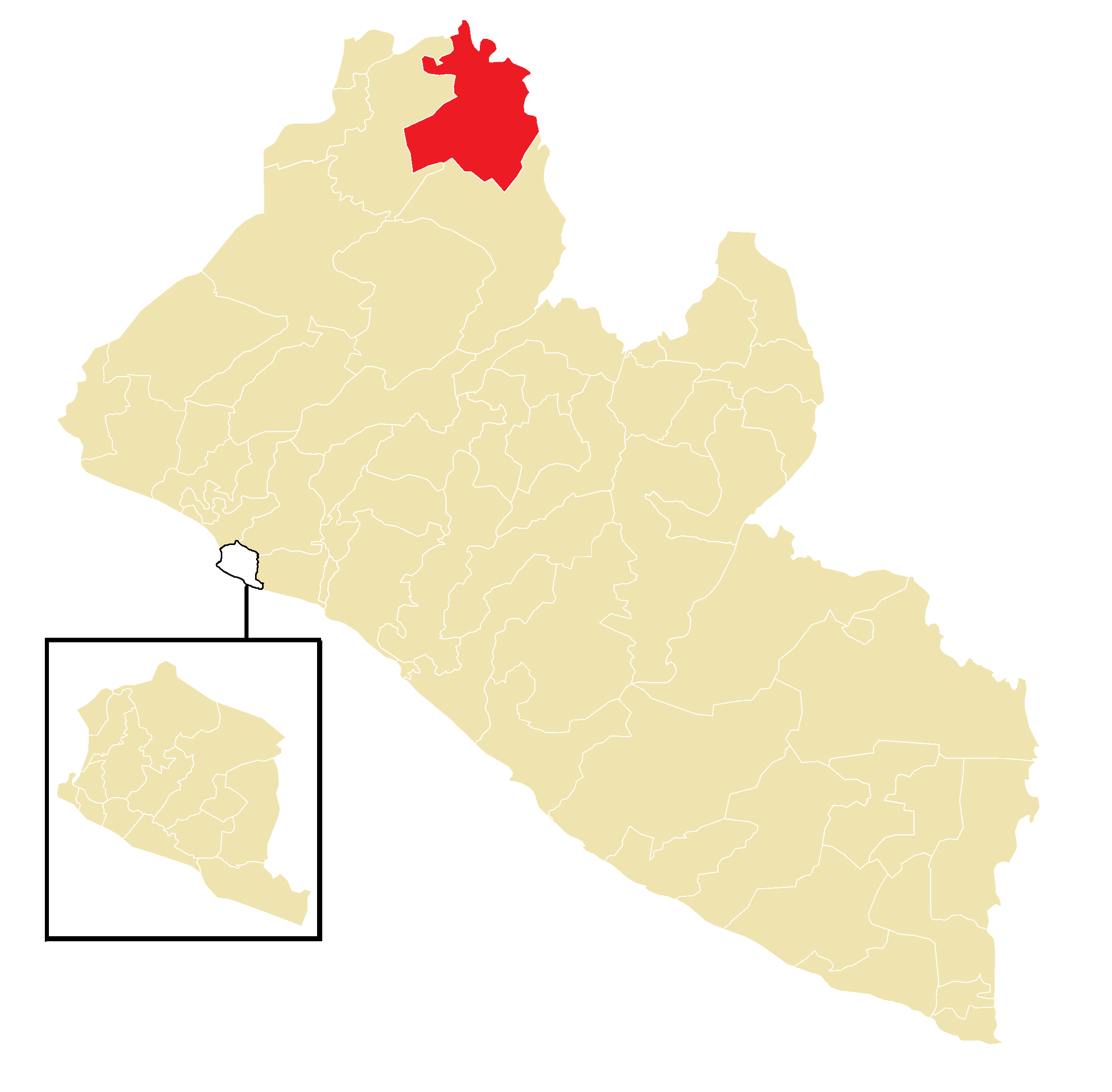
- Electorate: 43,061 (2023)

Current constituency
- Created: 2011
- Representative: Gizzie K. Kollince

Lofa-4 is an electoral district for the elections to the House of Representatives of Liberia. The constituency covers Voinjama City, Quardu Gboni District, six communities of Voinjama District (Worbalamai, Kesselemai, Vezala, Dayzabah, Zogolemai, Karzah) and two communities of Zorzor District (Barziwen, Konia).

== Elected representatives ==
Year	Representative elected	Party	Notes
2005	Moses Yarkpazuo Kollie	COTOL	
2011	Mariamu B. Fofana	UP	
2017	Mariamu B. Fofana	UP	
2023	Gizzie K. Kollince	UP	

== Election results ==
2005 Lofa County's 4th House District Election
Candidate	Party	Votes	%
Moses Yarkpazuo Kollie	Coalition for the Transformation of Liberia	5,799	40.80
Beyan D. Howard	Liberty Party	3,226	22.70
C. Cor-Pulu Fred Farwenel Sr.	New Deal Movement	3,044	21.42
Jacob Mulbah Garmi	Unity Party	1,021	7.18
James K. Godson	Union of Liberian Democrats	896	6.30
William Kulubah Kpukuyou	Alliance for Peace and Democracy	227	1.60
Total		14,213	100.00
Valid votes		14,213	94.79
Invalid/blank votes		781	5.21
Total votes		14,994	100.00

2011 Lofa County's 4th House District Election
Candidate	Party	Votes	%
Mariamu B. Fofana	Unity Party	4,631	22.76
Ruth Kiabeh Kpadeh	Independent	2,574	12.65
Zubah G. Aggrey	Liberia National Union	2,305	11.33
Fobay Falayelah Dorbor	Congress for Democratic Change	2,238	11.00
Mohammed O. Kamara	Independent	1,888	9.28
James Tarnue Korboi	Liberty Party	1,520	7.47
Malian K. Jallabah	All Liberia Coalition Party	1,039	5.11
Varfee Mamadee Konneh	Independent	1,039	5.11
Roland Yarkpawolo Worwee	Movement for Progressive Change	781	3.84
Alhaji Sekou Fofana	National Democratic Coalition	616	3.03
G. Alphonso W. Woiwor	National Union for Democratic Progress	550	2.70
Fomba Kollie Lombeh	Liberia Restoration Party	515	2.53
Domity Cordor Akoi Jr.	Liberia Transformation Party	420	2.06
Abraham S. Kanneh	Progressive Democratic Party	229	1.13
Total		20,345	100.00
Valid votes		20,345	87.69
Invalid/blank votes		2,856	12.31
Total votes		23,201	100.00

2017 Lofa County's 4th House District Election
Candidate	Party	Votes	%
Mariamu B. Fofana (Incumbent)	Unity Party	8,438	29.24
Gizzie K. Kollince	United People's Party	8,127	28.16
Sekou Brahima Korleh	Liberty Party	6,244	21.64
Ruth Kiabeh Kpadeh	All Liberian Party	2,202	7.63
James F. Tellewoyan	Grassroot Democratic Party of Liberia	1,977	6.85
Marzu Komassa Boakai	Coalition for Democratic Change	569	1.97
Sekou M. Dolleh	Movement for Economic Empowerment	404	1.40
Louise K. Haba	Independent	341	1.18
Elizabeth Konah B. Collins	Coalition for Liberia's Progress	233	0.81
Roland Y. Worwee	Movement for Progressive Change	180	0.62
Augustine Saah McCabe	Alternative National Congress	141	0.49
Total		28,856	100.00
Valid votes		28,856	95.05
Invalid/blank votes		1,504	4.95
Total votes		30,360	100.00
