= Grand Bassa-4 =

Electoral district in Liberia

- Constituency for the House of Representatives of Liberia
- Electorate: 30,749 (2023)

Current constituency
- Representative: Alfred H. Flomo

Grand Bassa-4 is an electoral district for the elections to the House of Representatives of Liberia. It is located in a north-western portion of Grand Bassa County, bordering Bong, Nimba, and Rivercess counties.

== Elected representatives ==
Year	Representative elected	Party	Notes
2005	Gabriel B. Smith	LP	
2011	Jeh Byron Browne	LP	
2017	Vincent S. T. Willie II	IND	
2023	Alfred H. Flomo	UP	

== Election results ==
2005 Grand Bassa County's 4th House District Election
Candidate	Party	Votes	%
Gabriel B. Smith	Liberty Party	8,099	47.83
Etta Summarmah Kpui Nasser	Unity Party	2,746	16.22
Elizabeth Mayuepleh Barwon	Coalition for the Transformation of Liberia	1,661	9.81
John S. C. Williams	Congress for Democratic Change	1,241	7.33
Arthur B. Jimmy	National Democratic Party of Liberia	816	4.82
Christian E. Moore	New Deal Movement	596	3.52
K. M. Bailey Togba	Independent	537	3.17
Samuel Gier Reeves	National Patriotic Party	419	2.47
Borbor Baryogar Barchue	Reformed United Liberia Party	417	2.46
Buster Gargar Verdier Sr.	Freedom Alliance Party of Liberia	401	2.37
Total		16,933	100.00
Valid votes		16,933	93.78
Invalid/blank votes		1,123	6.22
Total votes		18,056	100.00

2011 Grand Bassa County's 4th House District Election
Candidate	Party	Votes	%
Jeh Byron Browne	Liberty Party	5,155	33.86
Fred Dahndyu Tukue	Unity Party	2,178	14.30
Bob Augustus Zangar	National Democratic Party of Liberia	1,847	12.13
Junius D. Zoegar II	Congress for Democratic Change	1,580	10.38
Bailey K. M. Togba	Alliance for Peace and Democracy	1,512	9.93
Eric B. Jackson	National Democratic Coalition	1,306	8.58
Jacob Franco Ganteh	Liberia Transformation Party	616	4.05
Daniel Yancee Taylue	Grassroot Democratic Party of Liberia	470	3.09
T. Nathan G. Horace Sr.	National Union for Democratic Progress	331	2.17
L. Solomon Watson	Movement for Progressive Change	231	1.52
Total		15,226	100.00
Valid votes		15,226	91.76
Invalid/blank votes		1,367	8.24
Total votes		16,593	100.00

2017 Grand Bassa County's 4th House District Election
Candidate	Party	Votes	%
Vincent S. T. Willie II	Independent	5,896	29.81
Nicholas Vancia Barkon	Liberia Transformation Party	4,713	23.83
Jeh Byron Browne (Incumbent)	Liberty Party	4,131	20.89
Kokpar B. Wohwoh	Unity Party	1,178	5.96
Jeremiah Dahn	United People's Party	944	4.77
Etta Juah Kpui Nasser	Alternative National Congress	927	4.69
Eric B. Jackson	Liberian People's Party	541	2.74
George J. Morris	Coalition for Democratic Change	480	2.43
David Sulono Frank	All Liberian Party	457	2.31
Fred Dandyu Tukue	Movement for Democracy and Reconstruction	259	1.31
Velda Page Zayzay	Movement for Economic Empowerment	155	0.78
Otis B. Gayman	Movement for Progressive Change	98	0.50
Total		19,779	100.00
Valid votes		19,779	93.39
Invalid/blank votes		1,400	6.61
Total votes		21,179	100.00
