= Grand Cape Mount-2 =

Electoral district in Liberia

- Constituency for the House of Representatives of Liberia
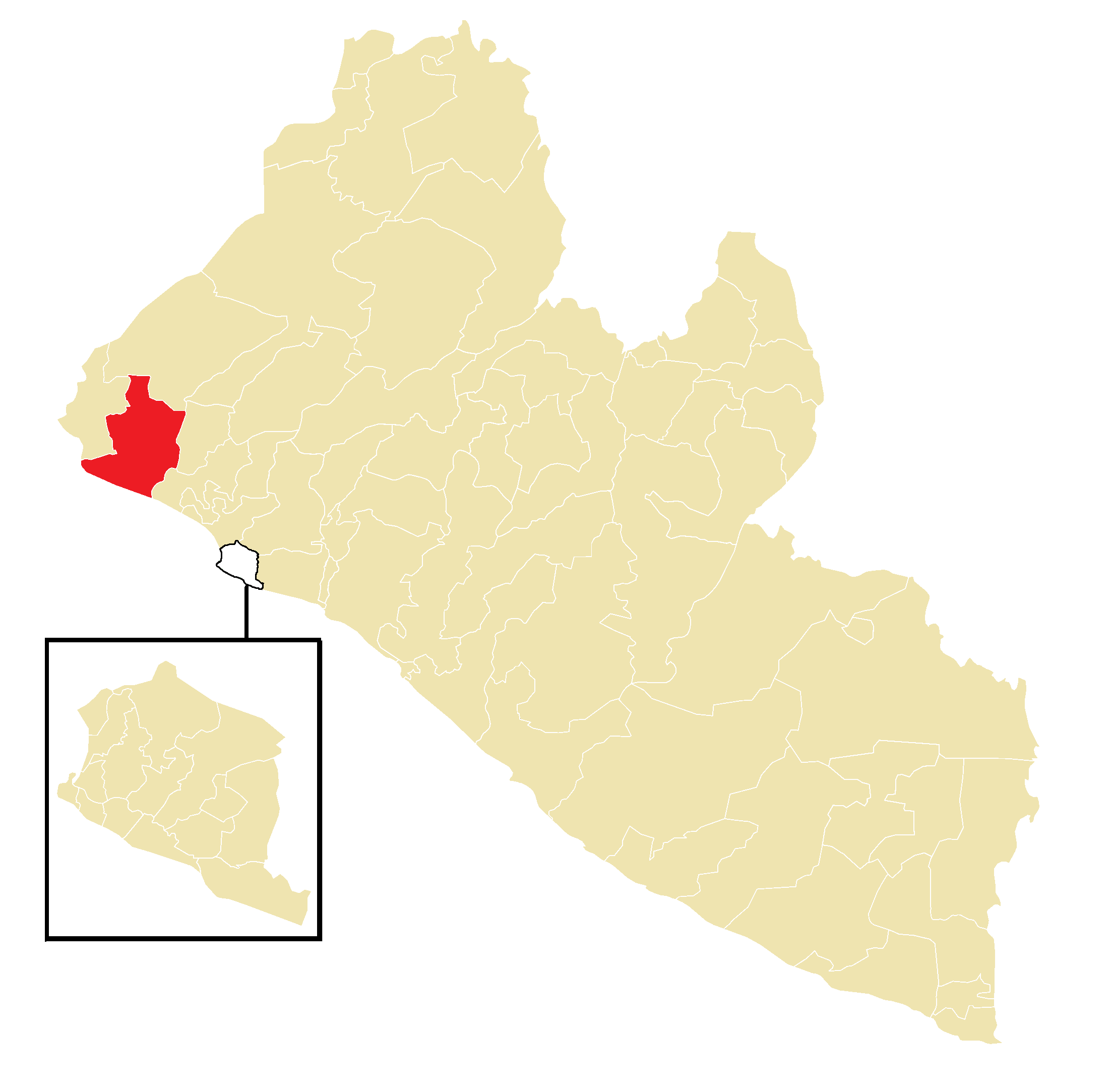
- Electorate: 28,451 (2023)

Current constituency
- Created: 2011
- Representative: Mohammed Dosii

Grand Cape Mount-2 is an electoral district for the elections to the House of Representatives of Liberia. The constituency covers Robertsport City, Garwula District, the Jenne Brown community of Gola Konneh District and Mandoe and Sembehum communities of the Robertsport Commonwealth District.

== Elected representatives ==
Year	Representative elected	Party	Notes
2005	Matthew V. Z. Darblo, Sr.	COTOL	
2011	Mambu M. Sonii	LP	
2017	Mambu M. Sonii	LP	
2023	Mohammed Dosii	IND	

== Election results ==
2005 Grand Cape Mount County's 2nd House District Election
Candidate	Party	Votes	%
Matthew V. Z. Darblo Sr.	Coalition for the Transformation of Liberia	4,457	45.79
Philip Momoh Quaye Sr.	Unity Party	1,881	19.33
James Momodu Madave	Union of Liberian Democrats	898	9.23
Satta Sheriff Kanneh	Reformed United Liberia Party	846	8.69
Abraham Dassama Johnson Sellu I	Congress for Democratic Change	634	6.51
Frederick Kelkeh Metzger	National Patriotic Party	379	3.89
Jeremiah Dennis Blake	Liberty Party	320	3.29
Momo Francis Sheriff Jr.	National Reformation Party	239	2.46
Bai Borbor Bahnbulleh	Independent	79	0.81
Total		9,733	100.00
Valid votes		9,733	94.65
Invalid/blank votes		550	5.35
Total votes		10,283	100.00

2011 Grand Cape Mount County's 2nd House District Election
Candidate	Party	Votes	%
Mambu M. Sonii	Liberty Party	4,293	33.09
Mohammed Abraham Ware Sr.	Independent	1,806	13.92
Eugene Musa H. Shannon	Unity Party	1,762	13.58
Feweh Benedict Sherman	National Patriotic Party	1,617	12.47
Lusine Gray	National Democratic Coalition	1,203	9.27
Seiku A. Fahnbulleh	Independent	507	3.91
M. Abdurahman Kiazolu	Victory for Change Party	447	3.45
M. Abdul-Aziz Balo	Liberia Transformation Party	386	2.98
Mohammed Momolu Kiawu	Citizens Unification Party	294	2.27
Konah Ellen Quoi	Freedom Alliance Party of Liberia	218	1.68
Mambu George David	Grassroot Democratic Party of Liberia	210	1.62
Edwin Boakai Zoludua Sr.	Union of Liberian Democrats	151	1.16
Samuel Tonie Massaquoi	Liberia Destiny Party	78	0.60
Total		12,972	100.00
Valid votes		12,972	92.33
Invalid/blank votes		1,077	7.67
Total votes		14,049	100.00

2017 Grand Cape Mount County's 2nd House District Election
Candidate	Party	Votes	%
Mambu M. Sonii (Incumbent)	Liberty Party	5,585	33.19
Varney Alieu Pusah	Coalition for Liberia's Progress	2,920	17.35
K. Rich Foboi	Movement for Democracy and Reconstruction	2,317	13.77
Siaffa Dudu Gray Sr.	Independent	1,504	8.94
Momodu Sombai	Unity Party	1,417	8.42
Osuman B. Kiazolu	Coalition for Democratic Change	814	4.84
Edwin G. K. Zoedua	Movement for Progressive Change	524	3.11
Alfred Femoh Quayjandii	People's Unification Party	513	3.05
Mohammed Abraham Ware Sr.	Liberia Transformation Party	413	2.45
Sando Boima Grant	Movement for Economic Empowerment	395	2.35
Catherine N. Watson Khasu	All Liberian Party	197	1.17
Elizabeth G. Meatta Armstrong	Alternative National Congress	134	0.80
Fatorma S. V. Kemokai	Vision for Liberia Transformation	93	0.55
Total		16,826	100.00
Valid votes		16,826	94.68
Invalid/blank votes		946	5.32
Total votes		17,772	100.00
