= Grand Bassa-3 =

Electoral district in Liberia

- Constituency for the House of Representatives of Liberia
- Electorate: 38,527 (2023)

Current constituency
- Representative: Matthew Joe

Grand Bassa-3 is an electoral district for the elections to the House of Representatives of Liberia. It is located in a central portion of Grand Bassa County, encompassing much of the Buchanan area.

== Elected representatives ==
Year	Representative elected	Party	Notes
2005	Edward Bueh Sundaygar	LP	Died in office.
2007	Jeh Byron Browne	LP	
2011	Gabriel B. Smith	IND	
2017	Matthew Joe	CDC	
2023	Matthew Joe	CDC	

== Election results ==
2005 Grand Bassa County's 3rd House District Election
Candidate	Party	Votes	%
Edward Bueh Sundaygar	Liberty Party	3,178	20.18
Eric B. Jackson	Free Democratic Party	2,994	19.02
Augustus Bob Zangar	Congress for Democratic Change	2,917	18.53
Murphy G. Harris Duobai	National Democratic Party of Liberia	1,595	10.13
Amos N. Karyea	National Reformation Party	1,071	6.80
Obediah Youado Zangar Sr.	Coalition for the Transformation of Liberia	1,005	6.38
James T. Mendscole	National Patriotic Party	990	6.29
Marie Dogboma Parker	Unity Party	845	5.37
Della G. Stewart Moore	Freedom Alliance Party of Liberia	662	4.20
Hitler P. Wragboe	New Deal Movement	488	3.10
Total		15,745	100.00
Valid votes		15,745	93.03
Invalid/blank votes		1,179	6.97
Total votes		16,924	100.00

2007 Grand Bassa County's 3rd House District By-election, Round 1
Candidate	Party	Votes	%
Abel Moses Nyounbol	Unity Party	1,189	26.36
Jeh Byron Browne	Liberty Party	1,033	22.90
Augustus Bob Zangar	Independent	838	18.58
John Kimber Mannie	Independent	312	6.92
Fred Dahndyn Tukue	Independent	302	6.70
Orishall L. Gould	Congress for Democratic Change	259	5.74
Robert Tuesday Vonyeegar	Independent	215	4.77
Eric B. Jackson	Free Democratic Party	169	3.75
T. Nathan G. Horace	Independent	157	3.48
Roland Oldman Wee	Independent	36	0.80
Total		4,510	100.00
Valid votes		4,510	95.84
Invalid/blank votes		196	4.16
Total votes		4,706	100.00

2007 Grand Bassa County's 3rd House District By-election, Round 2
Candidate	Party	Votes	%
Jeh Byron Browne	Liberty Party	3,042	56.68
Abel Moses Nyounbol	Unity Party	2,325	43.32
Total		5,367	100.00
Valid votes		5,367	96.27
Invalid/blank votes		208	3.73
Total votes		5,575	100.00

2011 Grand Bassa County's 3rd House District Election
Candidate	Party	Votes	%
Gabriel B. Smith	Independent	6,818	38.26
Elizabeth Mar-u-pleh Barwon	Unity Party	3,794	21.29
Albert Calvin Saab	Congress for Democratic Change	2,469	13.86
George B. Gaybueh	Liberty Party	2,015	11.31
Laurence Konmla Bropleh	Independent	1,367	7.67
Mark Whea Dargbeh	National Democratic Coalition	451	2.53
Moses Amuchine Gborgar	Liberia Transformation Party	362	2.03
Emmanuel S. Bryant	Movement for Progressive Change	294	1.65
J. Boakai G. Russell	Union of Liberian Democrats	250	1.40
Total		17,820	100.00
Valid votes		17,820	94.35
Invalid/blank votes		1,067	5.65
Total votes		18,887	100.00

2017 Grand Bassa County's 3rd House District Election
Candidate	Party	Votes	%
Matthew Joe	Coalition for Democratic Change	13,318	54.55
Gabriel B. Smith (Incumbent)	Liberty Party	5,912	24.22
Julia M. Duncan-Cassell	Coalition for Liberia's Progress	2,320	9.50
Laurence Konmla Bropleh	Movement for Economic Empowerment	1,494	6.12
Togar Alexander Bealded	Grassroot Democratic Party of Liberia	766	3.14
Elizabeth M. Barwon	Alternative National Congress	422	1.73
Joseph B. Daniels	Movement for Progressive Change	182	0.75
Total		24,414	100.00
Valid votes		24,414	96.58
Invalid/blank votes		864	3.42
Total votes		25,278	100.00
