= Maryland-1 =

Electoral district in Liberia

- Constituency for the House of Representatives of Liberia
- Electorate: 21,122 (2023)

Current constituency
- Representative: P. Mike Jurry

Maryland-1 is an electoral district for the elections to the House of Representatives of Liberia. It is located in a southern portion of Maryland County, encompassing the county's coast, as well as bordering Grand Kru County and the Ivory Coast. It contains the county capital, Harper.

== Elected representatives ==
Year	Representative elected	Party	Notes
2005	David Gwiah Saydee	APD	
2011	James P. Biney	NPP	
2017	P. Mike Jurry	UP	
2023	P. Mike Jurry	CDC	

== Election results ==
2005 Maryland County's 1st House District Election
Candidate	Party	Votes	%
David Gwiah Saydee	Alliance for Peace and Democracy	3,102	34.16
G. Glomah Wah	Unity Party	2,073	22.83
Solomon Saide Nyemah Smith	National Patriotic Party	1,526	16.80
Adolphus G. Wallace	Congress for Democratic Change	1,118	12.31
Ben J. Wilson	Coalition for the Transformation of Liberia	753	8.29
Sophia Diode Dennis	Liberty Party	509	5.61
Total		9,081	100.00
Valid votes		9,081	92.92
Invalid/blank votes		692	7.08
Total votes		9,773	100.00

2011 Maryland County's 1st House District Election
Candidate	Party	Votes	%
James P. Biney	National Patriotic Party	2,579	26.39
P. Mike Jurry	Liberia Transformation Party	1,964	20.09
George Andrew Prowd	National Democratic Coalition	1,291	13.21
Helena Nyeneplu C. Bedell	Unity Party	1,237	12.66
A. Wakla Neufville II	Movement for Progressive Change	873	8.93
Emmanuel Weh Walker	Independent	610	6.24
Groba Leo Williams	National Union for Democratic Progress	487	4.98
Lee Gahie Newton	Liberty Party	281	2.87
Wah Woart Sr.	Union of Liberian Democrats	185	1.89
Joel Mombo Jackson	National Democratic Party of Liberia	168	1.72
T. Wleh Shad Dennis	Liberia Destiny Party	99	1.01
Total		9,774	100.00
Valid votes		9,774	91.85
Invalid/blank votes		867	8.15
Total votes		10,641	100.00

2017 Maryland County's 1st House District Election
Candidate	Party	Votes	%
P. Mike Jurry	Unity Party	4,763	37.44
William Wade Wallace	True Whig Party	1,695	13.32
Olayee S. Collins	Coalition for Democratic Change	1,218	9.57
J. Jenkins Kla Yancy	People's Unification Party	1,205	9.47
Emmanuel W. Walker	Victory for Change Party	834	6.56
Abraham B. Jackson	Liberty Party	630	4.95
John Dio Kimber III	Independent	472	3.71
Roland T. Barnes Jr.	All Liberian Party	434	3.41
Josephine Y. Allison	United People's Party	433	3.40
Mamie Moulton Funnebo	Alternative National Congress	392	3.08
Nah Kwebo Huskin	Liberia Restoration Party	241	1.89
Nyekan Peter Swen	Movement for Democracy and Reconstruction	205	1.61
Lovette Himidae Wallace	Liberian People's Party	200	1.57
Total		12,722	100.00
Valid votes		12,722	94.13
Invalid/blank votes		794	5.87
Total votes		13,516	100.00
