= Grand Bassa-2 =

Electoral district in Liberia

- Constituency for the House of Representatives of Liberia
- Electorate: 30,726 (2023)

Current constituency
- Representative: J. Clarence T. Banks

Grand Bassa-2 is an electoral district for the elections to the House of Representatives of Liberia. It is located in a central portion of Grand Bassa County, bordering Bong and Margibi counties.

== Elected representatives ==
Year	Representative elected	Party	Notes
2005	Vinicius Sona Hodges	LP	
2011	Mary M. Karwor	UP	
2017	Mary M. Karwor	UP	
2023	J. Clarence T. Banks	IND	

== Election results ==
2005 Grand Bassa County's 2nd House District Election
Candidate	Party	Votes	%
Vinicius Sona Hodges	Liberty Party	4,188	25.95
John Siahn Cee	National Patriotic Party	3,338	20.69
Henry A. Vinjae Gogbor	Unity Party	2,485	15.40
Zanzan Gbotoe Karwor	Free Democratic Party	2,438	15.11
Dawn Julius Griggs	National Reformation Party	1,797	11.14
Daniel B. M. G. King	Congress for Democratic Change	982	6.09
Aaron W. Toto	Coalition for the Transformation of Liberia	908	5.63
Total		16,136	100.00
Valid votes		16,136	93.91
Invalid/blank votes		1,046	6.09
Total votes		17,182	100.00

2011 Grand Bassa County's 2nd House District Election
Candidate	Party	Votes	%
Mary M. Karwor	Unity Party	3,425	24.95
Morris Abu Siryon	Independent	2,338	17.03
Vinicius Sona Hodges (Incumbent)	National Democratic Coalition	1,817	13.24
Jessie Taylue	Liberty Party	1,538	11.21
Paul Oded Bandah	Freedom Alliance Party of Liberia	915	6.67
James E. Brooks	National Patriotic Party	752	5.48
Dawn Julius Griggs	Grassroot Democratic Party of Liberia	706	5.14
Louis Maxwell Diggs	National Union for Democratic Progress	638	4.65
Daniel B. M. G. King	Movement for Progressive Change	631	4.60
Aaron Mike Kugbeh	Liberia Transformation Party	534	3.89
David Vanyan Kennedy	Congress for Democratic Change	432	3.15
Total		13,726	100.00
Valid votes		13,726	91.97
Invalid/blank votes		1,198	8.03
Total votes		14,924	100.00

2017 Grand Bassa County's 2nd House District Election
Candidate	Party	Votes	%
Mary M. Karwor (Incumbent)	Unity Party	5,962	33.05
Johnson S. W. Garwhiyon	Alternative National Congress	1,687	9.35
Paul Oded Bandah	Liberia Restoration Party	1,510	8.37
Jessie K. Taylue	Liberty Party	1,338	7.42
James Emmanuel Brooks	Movement for Economic Empowerment	1,266	7.02
Thompson B. Dahnsaw	Change Democratic Action	1,255	6.96
Albenigo S. Janior	United People's Party	1,243	6.89
Michael G. Vambram	Liberia Transformation Party	879	4.87
Janjay Baikpeh	Coalition for Democratic Change	836	4.63
Shadrach Alpha Reeves	Movement for Progressive Change	752	4.17
Vinicius S. Hodges	True Whig Party	289	1.60
Johnson Metchel Kpandy	All Liberian Party	241	1.34
Moses P. Kamatoe	Democratic Justice Party	233	1.29
Evans R. Tobye	Coalition for Liberia's Progress	178	0.99
Dawn J. Griggs	Redemption Democratic Congress	156	0.86
Sam Opel Saygar Sr.	New Liberia Party	124	0.69
Jerry G. Gludoe	Liberian People's Party	91	0.50
Total		18,040	100.00
Valid votes		18,040	91.07
Invalid/blank votes		1,770	8.93
Total votes		19,810	100.00
