= Margibi-4 =

Electoral district in Liberia

- Constituency for the House of Representatives of Liberia
- Electorate: 28,510 (2023)

Current constituency
- Representative: Emmanuel Yarh

Margibi-4 is an electoral district for the elections to the House of Representatives of Liberia. It is located in a north-western portion of Margibi County, bordering Montserrado and Bong counties.

== Elected representatives ==
Year	Representative elected	Party	Notes
2005	Flasher Garjuan Chideryou	IND	Died in office.
2008	Ballah G. Zayzay	UP	
2011	Ben A. Fofana	UP	
2017	Ben A. Fofana	UP	
2023	Emmanuel Yarh	CDC	

== Election results ==
2005 Margibi County's 4th House District Election
Candidate	Party	Votes	%
Flasher Garjuan Chideryou	Independent	3,528	22.14
George S. Wright	Liberty Party	2,999	18.82
Robert Franz Morris	Unity Party	2,159	13.55
Louise Korpo Howard	Labor Party of Liberia	1,499	9.41
Joseph Ngobeh Kaiheyah	Union of Liberian Democrats	1,468	9.21
Mellish P. G. Weh	Congress for Democratic Change	1,385	8.69
Edward McCauley	Independent	1,093	6.86
Arthomilts Sieh Thomas	National Patriotic Party	956	6.00
George Gahway McGee Jr.	Coalition for the Transformation of Liberia	846	5.31
Total		15,933	100.00
Valid votes		15,933	93.96
Invalid/blank votes		1,024	6.04
Total votes		16,957	100.00

2011 Margibi County's 4th House District Election
Candidate	Party	Votes	%
Ben A. Fofana	Unity Party	6,575	42.72
Hannah Johnson-Slocum	National Patriotic Party	2,524	16.40
Lafayette T. Eastman	Movement for Progressive Change	1,125	7.31
Kekula Damela Golijikaye	Independent	884	5.74
Joseph Suma Dennis	Liberty Party	736	4.78
James Samuel Tarnue	Congress for Democratic Change	659	4.28
Augustine Kpengbah Yerwolo	National Democratic Coalition	592	3.85
Nixon Machor Duncan	Progressive Democratic Party	464	3.01
Vesselee G. Kollie Sr.	National Union for Democratic Progress	464	3.01
Augustine Korlie Jr.	Independent	391	2.54
James O. Dennis	Original Congress Party of Liberia	348	2.26
Alex Boima Lansana	Union of Liberian Democrats	347	2.25
Joe Bamomo Siryon	Liberia Restoration Party	283	1.84
Total		15,392	100.00
Valid votes		15,392	92.21
Invalid/blank votes		1,300	7.79
Total votes		16,692	100.00

2017 Margibi County's 4th House District Election
Candidate	Party	Votes	%
Ben A. Fofana (Incumbent)	Unity Party	7,977	38.84
Francis Fahnlon Cooper	People's Unification Party	5,363	26.11
Fred P. Weasah	Independent	2,155	10.49
J. Oseefeos Bainda	Liberia Transformation Party	1,638	7.98
Hannah J. Slocum	Coalition for Democratic Change	1,534	7.47
Begwoe S. Woenima	Alternative National Congress	674	3.28
Mohamed Keita	Movement for Economic Empowerment	390	1.90
Christopher Garmine Davis	Liberty Party	385	1.87
Edwin Moses Slocum	Movement for Democracy and Reconstruction	214	1.04
Betty Tarqueh Kabah	United People's Party	207	1.01
Total		20,537	100.00
Valid votes		20,537	94.93
Invalid/blank votes		1,096	5.07
Total votes		21,633	100.00
