= Bong-4 =

Liberian electoral district

- Constituency for the House of Representatives of Liberia
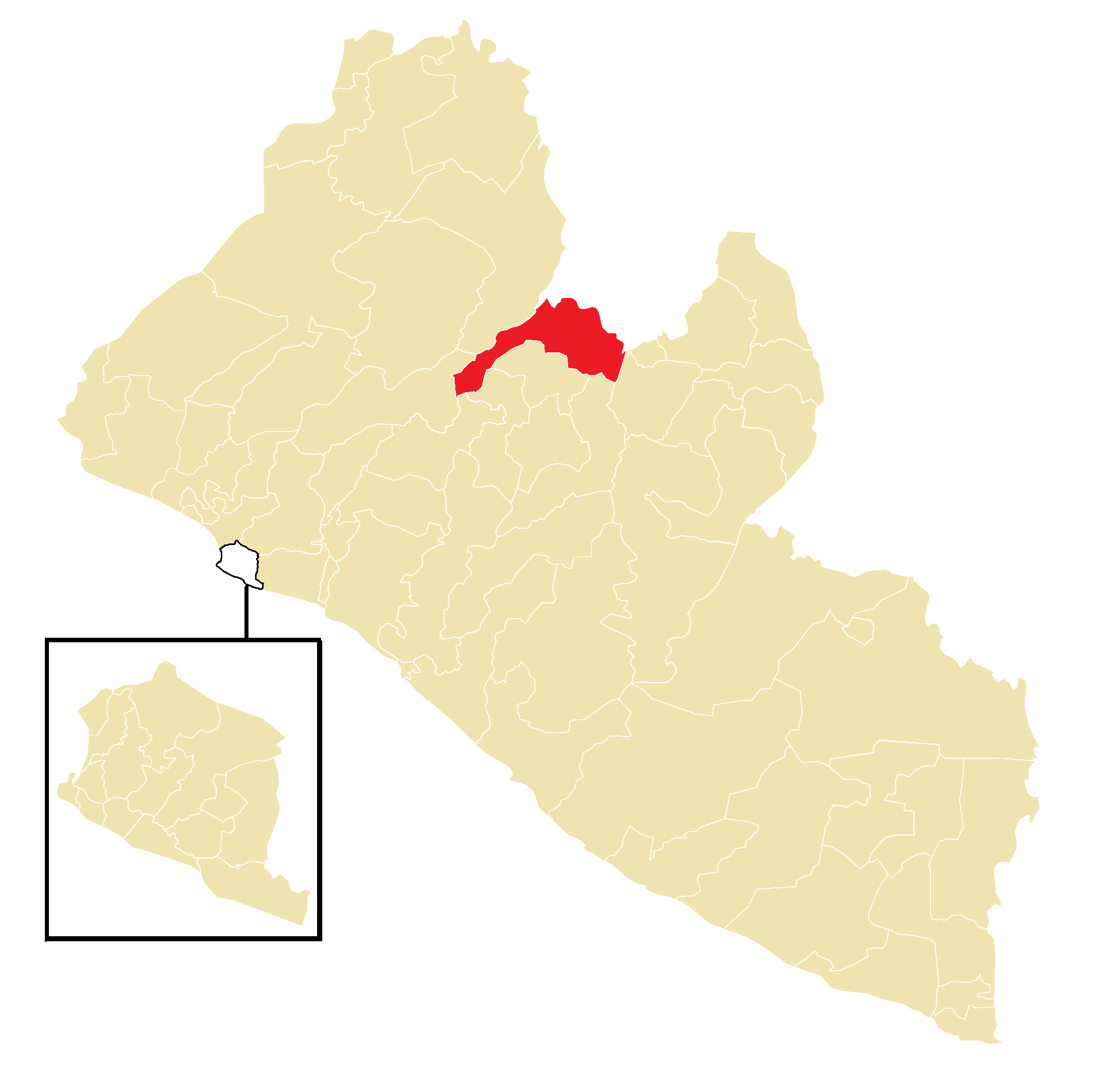
- Electorate: 30,029 (2023)

Current constituency
- Created: 2011
- Representative: Robert Womba

Bong-4 is an electoral district for the elections to the House of Representatives of Liberia. The constituency covers Panta District, nine communities of Zota District (Gbansue Sulonmah, Shamkpallai, Belefana, Jarkai, Nyansue, Gbansue, Pelelei, Farvey and Yowee) and three communities of Sanoyea District (Gou, Laryea and Gbonota).

== Elected representatives ==
Year	Representative elected	Party	Notes
2005	George S. Mulbah	NPP	
2011	Lester M. Paye	Ind.	
2017	Robert Womba	UP	
2023	Robert Womba	UP	

== Election results ==
2005 Bong County's 4th House District Election
Candidate	Party	Votes	%
George S. Mulbah	National Patriotic Party	3,261	18.60
Henry Wailee Yallah	New Deal Movement	3,161	18.03
Esther Coaline Warbey	Coalition for the Transformation of Liberia	2,388	13.62
Charles Morris Kollie	Alliance for Peace and Democracy	2,381	13.58
Omolu Joe Kpangbai	Unity Party	1,250	7.13
Bangalle Yousufu Sirleaf	Progressive Democratic Party	1,158	6.61
Kwalee Kokota Kweekeh	Congress for Democratic Change	1,151	6.57
Comfort Nowai Dolo	Liberty Party	934	5.33
Musu Leemu Faijue	National Democratic Party of Liberia	716	4.08
John Gbaweah McJoe	National Reformation Party	711	4.06
Samuel Bonne-Kollie Freeman	Labor Party of Liberia	419	2.39
Total		17,530	100.00
Valid votes		17,530	91.39
Invalid/blank votes		1,652	8.61
Total votes		19,182	100.00

2011 Bong County's 4th House District Election
Candidate	Party	Votes	%
Lester M. Paye	Independent	2,875	16.75
Susannah Lorpu Mator	Alliance for Peace and Democracy	2,696	15.70
Francis Kerkulah Nakai Darker	Citizens Unification Party	1,742	10.15
Isaac Veaker Urey	Unity Party	1,734	10.10
Rufus W. Kermee	Independent	1,653	9.63
Edwin Tokpa Juah	National Democratic Coalition	1,627	9.48
George F. Gbakolay	Movement for Progressive Change	1,575	9.17
Delino Jarfemah Kollie	Congress for Democratic Change	1,502	8.75
Joseph Mulbah Kerlie	Independent	857	4.99
James Aubrey Flomo	Liberia Transformation Party	537	3.13
Shelor Flomo Namue	Liberty Party	369	2.15
Total		17,167	100.00
Valid votes		17,167	92.87
Invalid/blank votes		1,317	7.13
Total votes		18,484	100.00

2017 Bong County's 4th House District Election
Candidate	Party	Votes	%
Robert Womba	Unity Party	4,232	19.61
Lester M. Paye (Incumbent)	Alternative National Congress	3,471	16.08
Susannah Lorpu Mator	United People's Party	3,179	14.73
Francis K. Nakai Darker Sr.	Movement for Progressive Change	2,817	13.05
James Namolon Paye	All Liberian Party	2,561	11.87
Jeremiah Bokay	Vision for Liberia Transformation	1,682	7.79
Delino J. Kollie	People's Unification Party	962	4.46
Shelor Flomo Namue	Victory for Change Party	717	3.32
Kanmue A. Polumaine	Liberia Transformation Party	466	2.16
Kewon S. Cortee	Liberia National Union	402	1.86
James C. R. Flomo	Movement for Economic Empowerment	387	1.79
Isaac Veaker Urey	Liberty Party	323	1.50
Aloysius Juakposhe	Coalition for Democratic Change	261	1.21
Alphanso Juagboshei	Liberian People's Party	122	0.57
Total		21,582	100.00
Valid votes		21,582	93.16
Invalid/blank votes		1,584	6.84
Total votes		23,166	100.00
