= Lofa-3 =

Electoral district in Liberia

- Constituency for the House of Representatives of Liberia
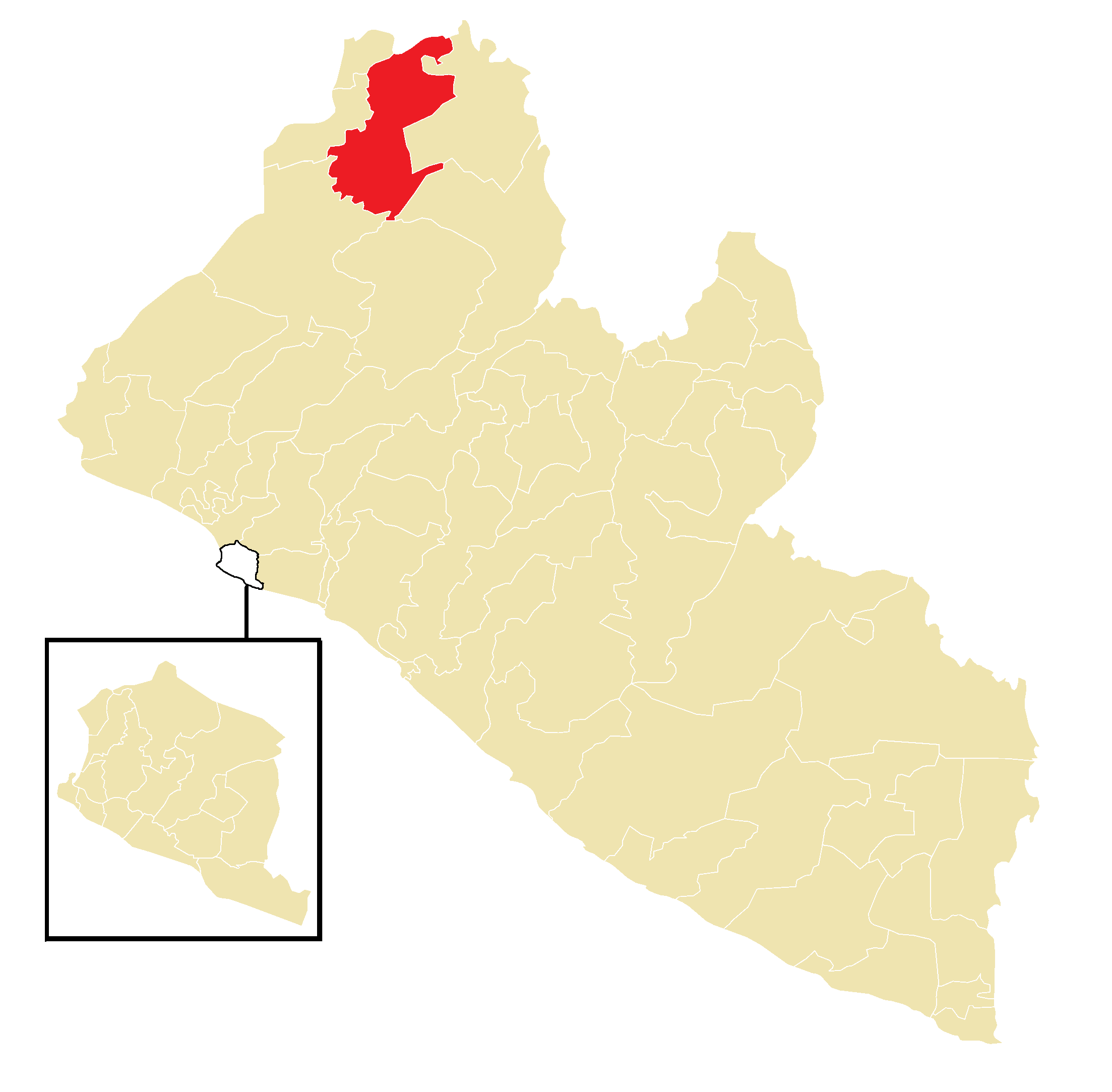
- Electorate: 29,606 (2023)

Current constituency
- Created: 2011
- Representative: Momo Siafa Kpoto

Lofa-3 is an electoral district for the elections to the House of Representatives of Liberia. The constituency covers Kolahun District (except the communities of Kamatahun, Popalahun and Lehun) and parts of Voinjama District (Zawordamai, Kpadehmai, Kpakamai, Tobogizizu, Lawalazu).

== Elected representatives ==
| Year | Representative elected | Party | Notes |
|---|---|---|---|
| 2005 | Malian Kanneh Jallabah | ALCOP | |
| 2011 | Clarence Massaquoi | UP | |
| 2017 | Clarence Massaquoi | UP | |
| 2023 | Momo Siafa Kpoto | CDC | |

== Election results ==
2005 Lofa County's 3rd House District Election
| Candidate | Party | Votes | % |
|---|---|---|---|
| Malian Kanneh Jallabah | All Liberia Coalition Party | 3,900 | 29.86 |
| Boakai Mohammed Sheriff | Progressive Democratic Party | 2,520 | 19.30 |
| Alhaji Sekou Fofana | Coalition for the Transformation of Liberia | 2,519 | 19.29 |
| Frederick A. Duwor | Liberty Party | 1,604 | 12.28 |
| Catherine Sonnie Akoi Kargbo | Unity Party | 963 | 7.37 |
| Mary D. Balloh | National Reformation Party | 771 | 5.90 |
| Ballahwala K. Kollieblee | National Patriotic Party | 509 | 3.90 |
| Kula Varney | Congress for Democratic Change | 273 | 2.09 |
| Total | | 13,059 | 100.00 |
| Valid votes | | 13,059 | 92.43 |
| Invalid/blank votes | | 1,070 | 7.57 |
| Total votes | | 14,129 | 100.00 |

2011 Lofa County's 3rd House District Election
| Candidate | Party | Votes | % |
|---|---|---|---|
| Clarence Massaquoi | Unity Party | 9,340 | 53.25 |
| Samuel Kpehe Ngaima | Liberty Party | 4,475 | 25.51 |
| Paul L. Moniba | Liberia National Union | 1,404 | 8.00 |
| Thomas Acquoi Sarko | Union of Liberian Democrats | 800 | 4.56 |
| Fatuma F. Lomax | National Democratic Coalition | 648 | 3.69 |
| Joseph Barbu Gaygay | Congress for Democratic Change | 563 | 3.21 |
| James Z. Gayflor | Liberia Transformation Party | 311 | 1.77 |
| Total | | 17,541 | 100.00 |
| Valid votes | | 17,541 | 94.09 |
| Invalid/blank votes | | 1,102 | 5.91 |
| Total votes | | 18,643 | 100.00 |

2017 Lofa County's 3rd House District Election
| Candidate | Party | Votes | % |
|---|---|---|---|
| Clarence Massaquoi (Incumbent) | Unity Party | 6,721 | 32.15 |
| Momo Siafa Kpoto | Liberty Party | 5,412 | 25.89 |
| Albert Ballah | Coalition for Liberia's Progress | 2,102 | 10.05 |
| James A. Cooper Sr. | Independent | 1,918 | 9.17 |
| William Saah Willie | People's Unification Party | 1,488 | 7.12 |
| Tom G. Koenig Jr. | Independent | 1,435 | 6.86 |
| Jefferson F. Nyandibo | Liberia National Union | 416 | 1.99 |
| Sangay E. B. S. Moses | All Liberian Party | 305 | 1.46 |
| Momolu S. Vannie | Grassroot Democratic Party of Liberia | 262 | 1.25 |
| Justine Amos Korvayan | Liberia Transformation Party | 238 | 1.14 |
| Vannie Sekou Dudu | Movement for Economic Empowerment | 193 | 0.92 |
| Joseph Ndebeh Morlu | Liberian People's Party | 157 | 0.75 |
| Korva Massa Jorgbor | United People's Party | 125 | 0.60 |
| Isaac Ndama | Coalition for Democratic Change | 69 | 0.33 |
| Alfred Kollie Sele | Alternative National Congress | 66 | 0.32 |
| Total | | 20,907 | 100.00 |
| Valid votes | | 20,907 | 95.16 |
| Invalid/blank votes | | 1,064 | 4.84 |
| Total votes | | 21,971 | 100.00 |
