= Maryland-3 =

Electoral district in Liberia

- Constituency for the House of Representatives of Liberia
- Electorate: 21,544 (2023)

Current constituency
- Representative: Austin Blidi Taylor

Maryland-3 is an electoral district for the elections to the House of Representatives of Liberia. It is located in a northern portion of Maryland County, bordering River Gee and Grand Kru counties, as well as the Ivory Coast.

== Elected representatives ==
Year	Representative elected	Party	Notes
2005	James P. Biney	NPP	
2011	Isaac B. Roland	LP	
2017	Isaac B. Roland	CDC	
2023	Austin Blidi Taylor	IND	

== Election results ==
2005 Maryland County's 3rd House District Election
Candidate	Party	Votes	%
James P. Biney	National Patriotic Party	4,278	53.30
Alfred Thowone Thompson	Coalition for the Transformation of Liberia	1,471	18.33
J. D. Hodo Merriam	National Democratic Party of Liberia	644	8.02
H. Suku-Toe Hodge	Unity Party	600	7.47
William Phillip Anderson Sr.	Reformed United Liberia Party	540	6.73
Eliza Monline Nah	Congress for Democratic Change	494	6.15
Total		8,027	100.00
Valid votes		8,027	94.03
Invalid/blank votes		510	5.97
Total votes		8,537	100.00

2011 Maryland County's 3rd House District Election
Candidate	Party	Votes	%
Isaac B. Roland	Liberty Party	1,549	16.73
David Gwiah Saydee	Unity Party	1,501	16.21
John C. Klon	Liberia Transformation Party	1,364	14.73
George Glomah Wah	Freedom Alliance Party of Liberia	1,335	14.42
Levi G. Goflee	Congress for Democratic Change	991	10.70
Julius Kwarbo Wesee	National Patriotic Party	974	10.52
Anthony D. Queejay	National Union for Democratic Progress	553	5.97
Ben J. Wilson	National Democratic Coalition	548	5.92
Solomon Geesayglocon K. Boe	Republican Party of Liberia	219	2.37
Moses Klayee Hinneh	National Social Democratic Party of Liberia	113	1.22
Joseph Celford Dalieh	National Democratic Party of Liberia	112	1.21
Total		9,259	100.00
Valid votes		9,259	94.59
Invalid/blank votes		530	5.41
Total votes		9,789	100.00

2017 Maryland County's 3rd House District Election
Candidate	Party	Votes	%
Isaac B. Roland (Incumbent)	Coalition for Democratic Change	2,250	19.16
Myers Bill Tuweh Jr.	People's Unification Party	1,780	15.16
J. Tiah Nagbe	Liberty Party	1,577	13.43
Edwin Kla Martin	True Whig Party	1,474	12.55
Jeremiah Toe Hinneh	United People's Party	1,214	10.34
John C. Klon	All Liberian Party	1,199	10.21
Levi G. Goflee	Liberian People's Party	641	5.46
Mason Chumud Goe	Alternative National Congress	578	4.92
Solomon S. Smith	Unity Party	392	3.34
George Glomah Wah	Liberia Restoration Party	335	2.85
Phelicia Geeloh Towalid	Movement for Economic Empowerment	167	1.42
Madison T. Clarke	Liberia Transformation Party	134	1.14
Total		11,741	100.00
Valid votes		11,741	92.96
Invalid/blank votes		889	7.04
Total votes		12,630	100.00
