= Lofa-5 =

Electoral district in Liberia

- Constituency for the House of Representatives of Liberia
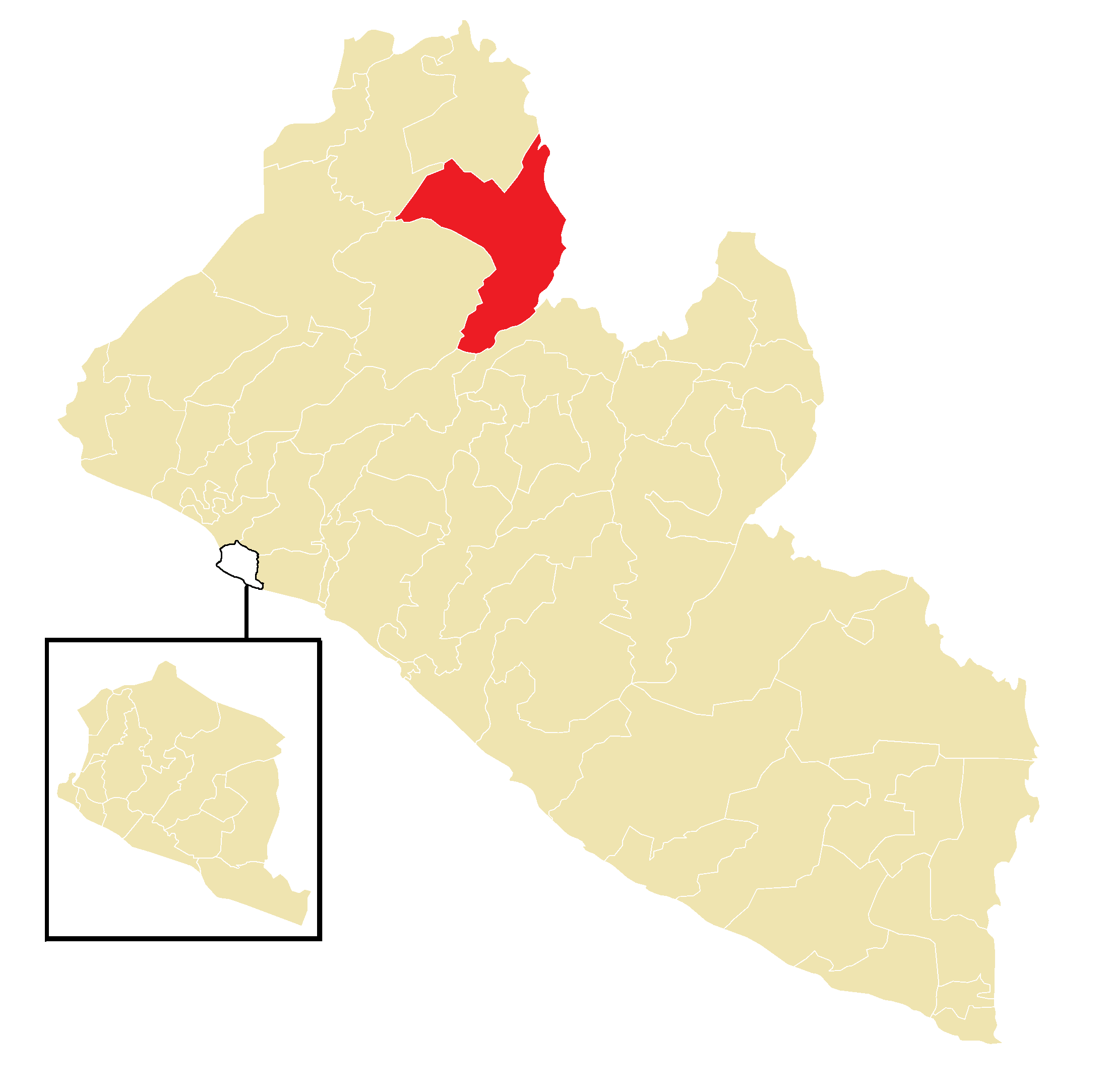
- Electorate: 37,908 (2023)

Current constituency
- Created: 2011
- Representative: Augustine B. Chiewolo

Lofa-5 is an electoral district for the elections to the House of Representatives of Liberia. The constituency covers Salayea District and Zorzor District (except Konia and Barziwen).

== Elected representatives ==
Year	Representative elected	Party	Notes
2011	Moses Y. Kollie	UP	
2017	Beyan Howard	Ind.	
2023	Augustine B. Chiewolo	UP	

== Election results ==
2011 Lofa County's 5th House District Election
Candidate	Party	Votes	%
Moses Y. Kollie	Unity Party	4,627	21.73
Victor F. Korlewala	Independent	2,618	12.29
Barbara Ballah Wilson	Independent	2,432	11.42
Darkollie Sumo	Independent	2,180	10.24
Fred Farwenel	National Democratic Coalition	1,989	9.34
Abel Zinatana Zayzay	Liberia Transformation Party	1,756	8.25
Benedict Kolubah	Congress for Democratic Change	1,466	6.88
Beyan Howard	Independent	1,458	6.85
Amos Mulbah Lavalah Sr.	Grassroot Democratic Party of Liberia	853	4.01
Barkolleh K. Joekai Sr.	Independent	730	3.43
Annie Markelee Flomo	Liberty Party	537	2.52
Pewu Gorvai Beyan	National Union for Democratic Progress	307	1.44
L. Mohammed Keita	All Liberia Coalition Party	201	0.94
Amex Ballah Johnson	National Social Democratic Party of Liberia	143	0.67
Total		21,297	100.00
Valid votes		21,297	91.96
Invalid/blank votes		1,862	8.04
Total votes		23,159	100.00

2017 Lofa County's 5th House District Election
Candidate	Party	Votes	%
Beyan Howard	Independent	6,602	25.81
Augustine Boye Chiewolo	All Liberian Party	5,195	20.31
Alexander S. Gargu	Coalition for Democratic Change	3,400	13.29
Stanley Sumo Kparkillen	Independent	2,329	9.10
David Woyea Ayeakpa	Grassroot Democratic Party of Liberia	1,862	7.28
Nathaniel Y. Mulbah	Victory for Change Party	1,355	5.30
Barbara Ballah-Wilson	Alternative National Congress	1,348	5.27
Victor F. Korlewala	People's Unification Party	1,255	4.91
P. Sumo Darwulo	Movement for Economic Empowerment	1,233	4.82
Beyan P. Sali	Liberia National Union	709	2.77
Gayflor G. Koikoi	Liberia Transformation Party	296	1.16
Total		25,584	100.00
Valid votes		25,584	95.57
Invalid/blank votes		1,187	4.43
Total votes		26,771	100.00
