= Bong-3 =

House of Representatives of Liberia electoral district

- Constituency for the House of Representatives of Liberia
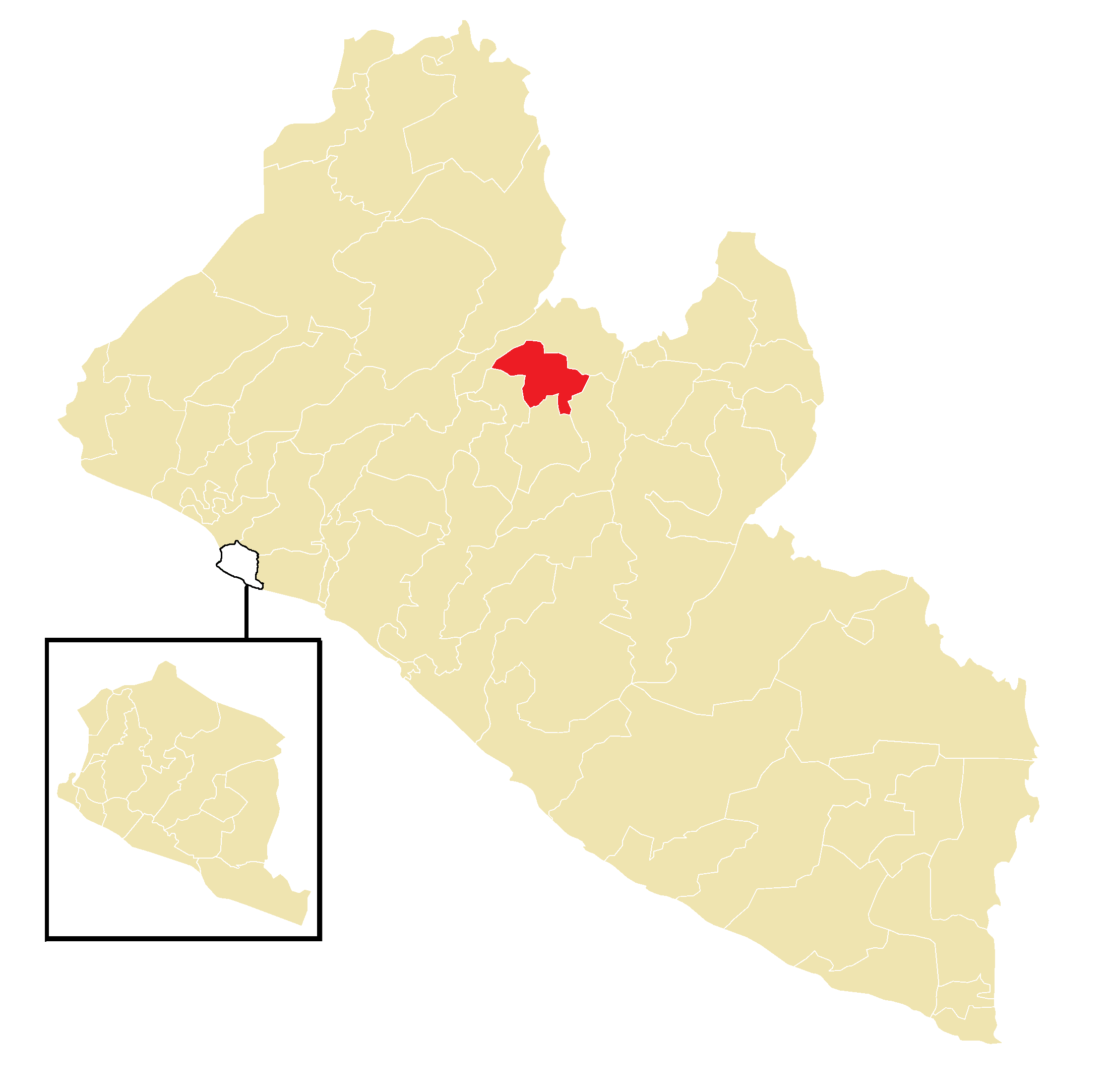
- Electorate: 41,840 (2023)

Current constituency
- Created: 2011
- Representative: J. Marvin Cole

Bong-3 is an electoral district for the elections to the House of Representatives of Liberia. The constituency covers six wards of Gbanga city (wards 1, 2, 3, 4, 6, 7), 7 communities of Jorquelleh District (i.e. Melekei-One, Wainsue-One, Gbarnay-Two, Wongbai-Three, Gbarmue-Four, Kpanyah-Two, Gbaota-One) and Kayata community of Zota District.

== Elected representatives ==
| Year | Representative elected | Party | Notes |
|---|---|---|---|
| 2005 | G. Samuel K. S. Bondo | LP | |
| 2011 | George S. Mulbah | NPP | |
| 2017 | J. Marvin Cole | CDC | |
| 2023 | J. Marvin Cole | CDC | |

== Election results ==
2005 Bong County's 3rd House District Election
| Candidate | Party | Votes | % |
|---|---|---|---|
| G. Samuel K. S. Bondo | Liberty Party | 4,899 | 30.67 |
| Viola Nyamah Cooper | Coalition for the Transformation of Liberia | 4,436 | 27.77 |
| Larwuson M. Tucker | Congress for Democratic Change | 2,618 | 16.39 |
| Joseph Orendor Clinton | Unity Party | 1,627 | 10.19 |
| Charles S. Rennie | United Democratic Alliance | 1,245 | 7.79 |
| Oretha Tinapu Dennis | Labor Party of Liberia | 1,147 | 7.18 |
| Total | | 15,972 | 100.00 |
| Valid votes | | 15,972 | 95.20 |
| Invalid/blank votes | | 805 | 4.80 |
| Total votes | | 16,777 | 100.00 |

2011 Bong County's 3rd House District Election
| Candidate | Party | Votes | % |
|---|---|---|---|
| George S. Mulbah | National Patriotic Party | 13,655 | 82.10 |
| Ansu Vamuyan Sesay | Liberty Party | 2,073 | 12.46 |
| Myrline Bendu Keculah | Unity Party | 905 | 5.44 |
| Total | | 16,633 | 100.00 |
| Valid votes | | 16,633 | 93.72 |
| Invalid/blank votes | | 1,114 | 6.28 |
| Total votes | | 17,747 | 100.00 |

2017 Bong County's 3rd House District Election
| Candidate | Party | Votes | % |
|---|---|---|---|
| J. Marvin Cole | Coalition for Democratic Change | 5,899 | 23.20 |
| Orando K. Zarwolo | All Liberian Party | 5,059 | 19.89 |
| Edward Emmanuel Gboe | Liberty Party | 3,888 | 15.29 |
| Martha C. T. Morris | Unity Party | 2,267 | 8.91 |
| George S. Mulbah (Incumbent) | People's Unification Party | 1,876 | 7.38 |
| Loleyah Hawa Norris | Victory for Change Party | 1,694 | 6.66 |
| Lasana M. Sirleaf | Independent | 984 | 3.87 |
| James Kamara | Movement for Democracy and Reconstruction | 882 | 3.47 |
| Augustus B. C. Flomo | Alternative National Congress | 856 | 3.37 |
| Jerry Kerkulah Kollie | United People's Party | 599 | 2.36 |
| James K. Saybay | Movement for Economic Empowerment | 577 | 2.27 |
| Jonathan M. Bass | Liberia Transformation Party | 319 | 1.25 |
| Prince V. Simpson | True Whig Party | 202 | 0.79 |
| Shelton Y. Beedoe | Change Democratic Action | 197 | 0.77 |
| Stephen J. Mulbah Jr. | Grassroot Democratic Party of Liberia | 131 | 0.52 |
| Total | | 25,430 | 100.00 |
| Valid votes | | 25,430 | 95.15 |
| Invalid/blank votes | | 1,296 | 4.85 |
| Total votes | | 26,726 | 100.00 |
