= Margibi-2 =

Electoral district in Liberia

- Constituency for the House of Representatives of Liberia
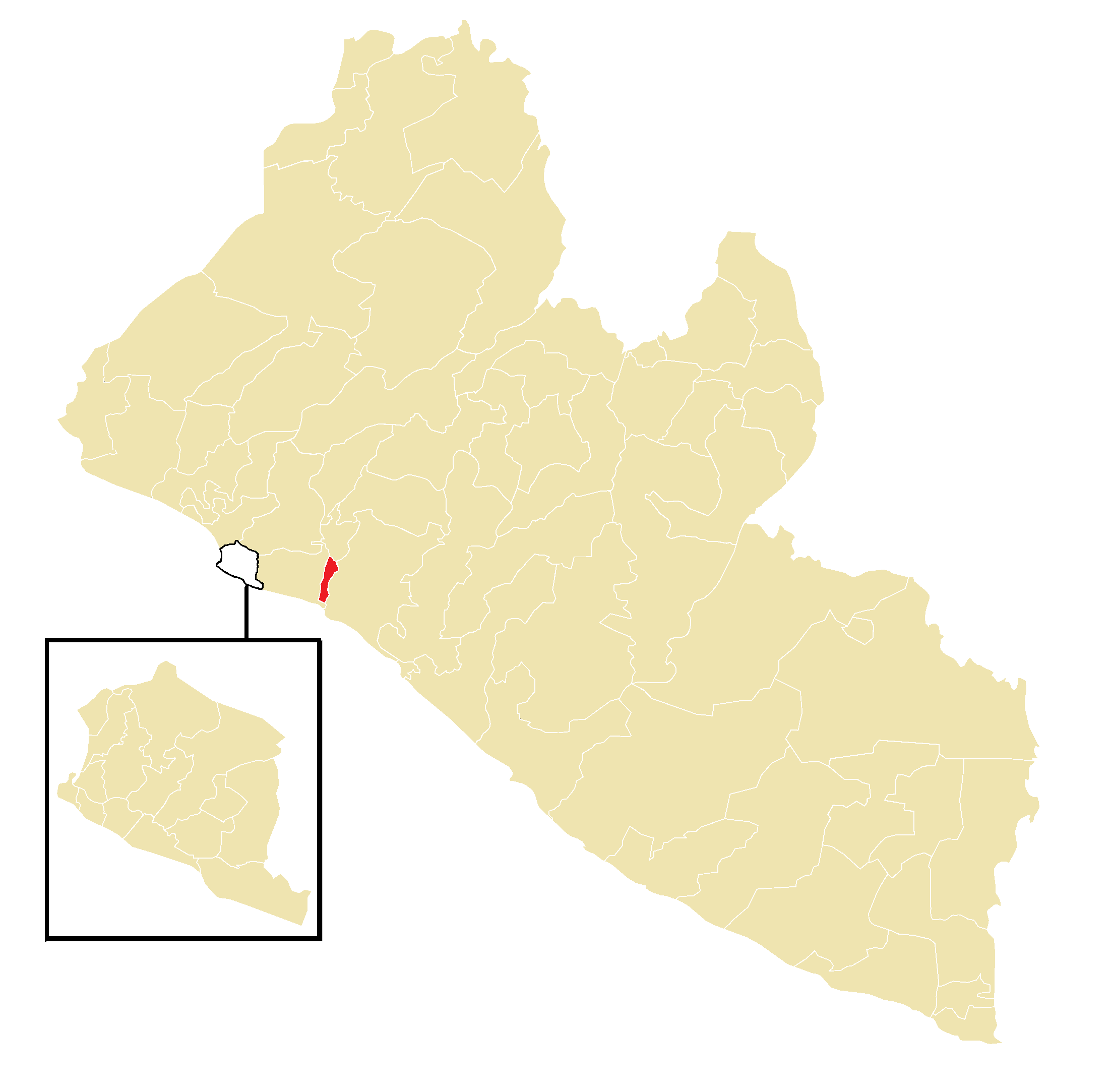
- Electorate: 33,434 (2023)

Current constituency
- Created: 2011
- Representative: Ivar K. Jones

Margibi-2 is an electoral district for the elections to the House of Representatives of Liberia. The constituency covers four communities of Mamabah-Kaba District; Cotton Tree, Dolo Town, Unification and Central Charlesville.

== Elected representatives ==
Year	Representative elected	Party	Notes
2005	Ansu Washington Lackie	UP	Died in office.
2006	Kollie Sorsor Jallah	CDC	
2011	Ballah G. Zayzay	UP	
2017	Ivar K. Jones	Ind.	
2023	Ivar K. Jones	CDC	

== Election results ==
2005 Margibi County's 2nd House District Election
Candidate	Party	Votes	%
Ansu Washington Lackie	Unity Party	3,304	20.09
Joseph S. Dennis	United Democratic Alliance	2,656	16.15
Kollie Sorsor Jallah	Congress for Democratic Change	2,453	14.91
C. Lawuo Gwesa	Coalition for the Transformation of Liberia	2,378	14.46
John Z. Buway	Free Democratic Party	2,289	13.92
Mc-Hilary Malawi Snoh	National Patriotic Party	1,857	11.29
Nanuh Prince Neblett	Liberty Party	1,512	9.19
Total		16,449	100.00
Valid votes		16,449	95.26
Invalid/blank votes		818	4.74
Total votes		17,267	100.00

2006 Margibi County's 2nd House District By-election, Round 1
Candidate	Party	Votes	%
Ben A. Fofana	Unity Party	2,869	45.15
Kollie Sorsor Jallah	Congress for Democratic Change	1,542	24.27
Edwin Woryonwon Harris	Independent	1,126	17.72
Zoe Gougou Willie	Liberty Party	817	12.86
Total		6,354	100.00
Valid votes		6,354	98.33
Invalid/blank votes		108	1.67
Total votes		6,462	100.00

2006 Margibi County's 2nd House District By-election, Round 2
Candidate	Party	Votes	%
Kollie Sorsor Jallah	Congress for Democratic Change	4,199	51.98
Ben A. Fofana	Unity Party	3,879	48.02
Total		8,078	100.00
Valid votes		8,078	98.44
Invalid/blank votes		128	1.56
Total votes		8,206	100.00

2011 Margibi County's 2nd House District Election
Candidate	Party	Votes	%
Ballah G. Zayzay	Unity Party	9,922	53.58
Joshua Velleh Robinson	Congress for Democratic Change	4,993	26.96
Nicholas Flomo Harris	Liberty Party	2,679	14.47
Varney Mulbah Barclay	Independent	925	4.99
Total		18,519	100.00
Valid votes		18,519	94.90
Invalid/blank votes		996	5.10
Total votes		19,515	100.00

2017 Margibi County's 2nd House District Election
Candidate	Party	Votes	%
Ivar Kokulo Jones	Independent	12,568	52.65
Ballah G. Zayzay (Incumbent)	Unity Party	6,748	28.27
Ricks Keller	Coalition for Democratic Change	1,293	5.42
H. Marcus Speare	Liberty Party	1,255	5.26
John D. Davis	Alternative National Congress	816	3.42
James Sellu Lomol	All Liberian Party	655	2.74
Louise G. Reeves	United People's Party	436	1.83
Georgian M. Patten	Liberia Restoration Party	102	0.43
Total		23,873	100.00
Valid votes		23,873	96.41
Invalid/blank votes		888	3.59
Total votes		24,761	100.00
