= Legislature of Liberia =

- 54th Liberian Legislature

Type
- Type: Bicameral
- Houses: Senate; House of Representatives

Leadership
- President of the Senate: Jeremiah Koung since 22 January 2024
- President Pro Tempore: Nyonblee Karnga-Lawrence since 15 January 2024
- Speaker of the House: Richard N. Koon since 21 November 2024

Structure
- Seats: 103; 30 Senators; 73 Representatives
- House of Representatives political groups: Unity (25) CDC (10) Liberty (7) NUDP (6) NDC (5) APD (3) NPP (3) MPC (2) LDP (1) LTP (1) NRP (1) Independents (9)
- Senate political groups: Unity (10) NPP (6) CDC (3) NUDP (2) APD (2) Liberty (1) NDC (1) LDP (1) NDPL (1) Independents (3)

Elections
- Last House of Representatives election: 10 October 2023
- Last Senate election: 10 October 2023
- Next House of Representatives election: 2029

Meeting place
- Capitol Building, Monrovia

Website
- legislature.gov.lr (archived)

The Legislature of Liberia is the bicameral legislature of the government of Liberia. It consists of a Senate – the upper house, and a House of Representatives – the lower house, modeled after the United States Congress. Sessions are held at the Capitol Building in Monrovia. Legislature of Liberia is considered one of the three branches of government based on the Article III of the Constitution of Liberia that stipulates all three branches ought to be equal and coordinated based on the Principle of checks and balances.

The House of Representatives contains 73 seats, with each county being apportioned a number of seats based on its population. The Senate has 30 members, with two senators, who won the first and second position, serving from each county elected based on popular vote. Both House and Senate seats are filled through direct election, with candidates who gain a plurality of the vote winning their contested seats. House members serve a term of six years and senators serve a term of nine years, with sitting members allowed to seek re-election.

The qualifications of the voters are the same for both the election of Senate and the House of Representatives. The qualifications for becoming a voter are the person should possess Liberian citizenship, should be aged at least 18 years old at the end of the registration period, should be registered on a voting roll, should be residing in the country during voter registration and on polling day. The qualification for being a Representative of the House are Liberian citizen by origin and aged at least 25 years old, while it is 30 years for becoming a member of the Senate. The requirements for political parties to field its candidates are the member nominated should be a member of the party and individuals who have gained at least 2 per cent of the total votes cast in the constituency the candidate is fielded. The political party should field candidates in at least 50 per cent of total constituencies and should field at least 30 per cent females. If on any circumstance the seat becomes vacant, by-elections are held within 90 days of the vacancy for both the Senate and the House.

== Legislature ==
The legislature of Liberia was modeled based on the United States Congress. It is bicameral in nature with a Senate and the House of Representatives. There are 15 counties in the country and based on the population, each county is defined to have at least two members, while the total number of members to the house including the Speaker of the House being 73. Each member represents an electoral district and elected to a six-year term based on popular vote.

There are 30 senators, two each for the 15 counties and they serve a nine-year term. Senators are also elected based on plurality of votes. The Vice President of Liberia is the head of the Senate and he also acts as President in his absence.

== Legislative powers ==
The Article III of the Constitution of Liberia stipulates Legislature as one of the three branches of government that ought to be equal and coordinated based on the Principle of checks and balances. The Constitution of Liberia defines legislature as a model of decentralization by defining counties, which are targeted to achieve national growth and development. The counties are further grouped into larger political subdivisions in the name provinces numbering four: Northern, Eastern, Western and Southern. The laws enacted by a province shall be applicable to its jurisdiction and all the provincial laws subordinate the national laws. The provincial capital is chosen by the provincial legislature. The executive administration of each county shall be governed by a County Superintendent and a Vice Superintendent, both of whom are elected by the residents of the county. The national governmental services are made available to residents of province through the branch offices established in each provincial capital. The provincial government are allowed to impose taxes, and allowed to act on stipulated national limits to best manage the resources in the province. The budgets of each province is managed by the province administration with the help of local taxes and central government subsidy. The legislature is mandated to convene on the first day of December, which coincides with the African liberty celebration.

== House of Representatives ==
The qualifications for becoming a voter of the House of Representatives are the person should possess Liberian citizenship, should be aged at least 18 years old at the end of the registration period, should be registered on a voting roll, should be residing in the country during voter registration and on polling day. Voters with mental illness and court-declared incompetency are disqualified to vote for the Representatives. The mandatory requirements for being a Representative of the House are Liberian citizen by origin and aged at least 25 years old. The requirements for political parties to field its candidates are the member nominated should be a member of the party and individuals who have gained at least 2 per cent of the total votes cast in the constituency the candidate is fielded. The candidates who obtained less than 2 per cent of votes are not qualified for the next election from the party. The political party should field candidates in at least 50 per cent of total constituencies and should field at least 30 per cent females. The candidates who secured the highest number of votes cast in a given constituency is declared the Representative of the House of the constituency. If on any circumstance the seat becomes vacant, by-elections are held within 90 days of the vacancy.

Elections from 1971
| Party | 1971 | 1975 | 1985 | 1997 | 2005 | 2011 |
|---|---|---|---|---|---|---|
| True Whig Party | 64 | 74 | | | | |
| National Democratic Party of Liberia (NDPL) | | | 51 | | 1 | |
| Liberian Action Party (LAP) | | | 8 | | | |
| Liberia Unification Party (LUP) | | | 3 | | | |
| Unity Party (UP) | | | 2 | 7 | 8 | 24 |
| All Liberia Coalition Party (ALCOP) | | | | 3 | 2 | |
| United People's Party (UPP) | | | | 2 | | |
| National Patriotic Party (NPP) | | | | 49 | 4 | 3 |
| Alliance of Political Parties (AIPP) | | | | 2 | | |
| Liberian People's Party (LPP) | | | | 1 | | |
| Liberty Party (LP) | | | | | 9 | 7 |
| Congress for Democratic Change (CDC) | | | | | 15 | 11 |
| Coalition for the Transformation of Liberia (COTOL) | | | | | 8 | |
| Independents | | | | | 7 | 9 |
| Alliance for Peace and Democracy (APD) | | | | | 5 | 3 |
| New Deal Movement (NDM) | | | | | 3 | |
| National Reformation Party (NRP) | | | | | 1 | 1 |
| UDA | | | | | 1 | |
| National Union for Democratic Progress (NUDP) | | | | | | 6 |
| National Democratic Coalition (NDC) | | | | | | 5 |
| Movement for Progressive Change (MPC) | | | | | | 2 |
| Liberia Destiny Party (LDP) | | | | | | 1 |
| Liberia Transformation Party (LTP) | | | | | | 1 |

== Senate ==
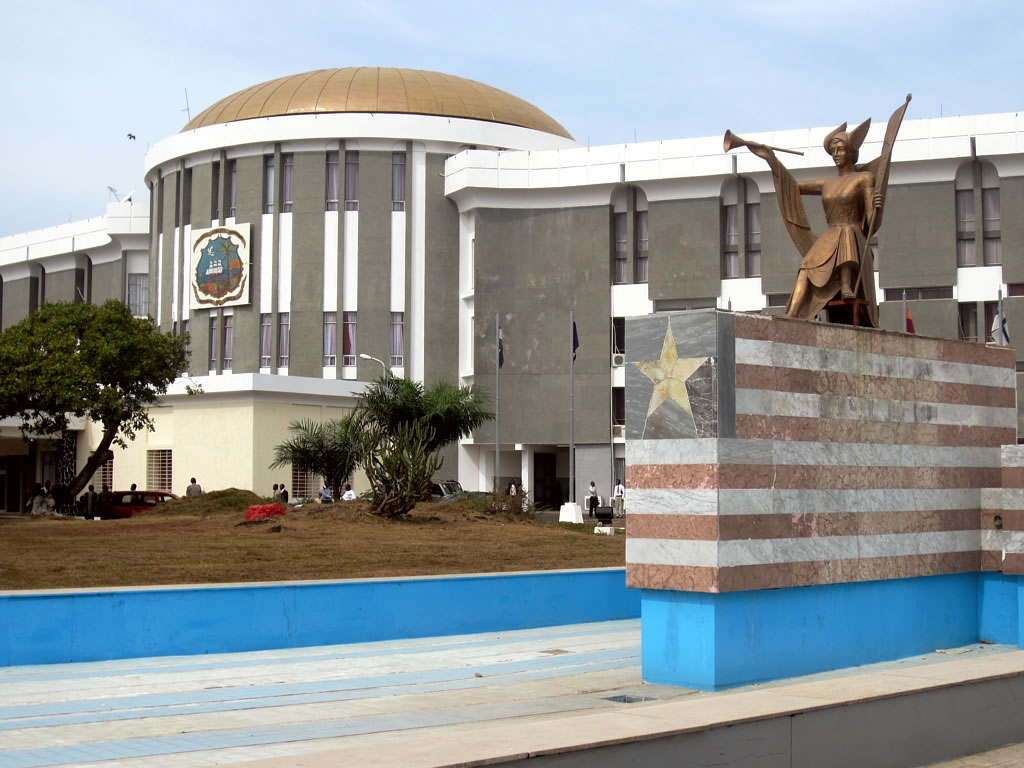
The Capitol Building of Liberia

The qualifications for becoming a voter of Senate are the person should possess Liberian citizenship, should be aged at least 18 years old at the end of the registration period, should be registered on a voting roll, should be residing in the country during voter registration and on polling day. Voters with mental illness and court-declared incompetency are disqualified to vote Senate members. The mandatory requirements for being a Senate member are Liberian citizen by origin and aged at least 30 years old. The requirements for political parties to field its candidates are the member nominated should be a member of the party and individuals who have gained at least 2 per cent of the total votes cast in the constituency the candidate is fielded. The candidates who obtained less than 2 per cent of votes are not qualified for the next election from the party. The political party should field candidates in at least 50 per cent of total constituencies and should field at least 30 per cent females.

The candidates who secured first and second position based on the number of votes cast in a given constituency are declared the senators of the constituency. As an exception, the candidates chosen second were allowed to continue for only a six-year term, but from 2011 elections, all winners and runners up would have a term of nine years. If on any circumstance the seat becomes vacant, by-elections are held within 90 days of the vacancy.

Senate Elections from 1985
| Party | 1985 | 1997 | 2005 | 2011 | 2014 |
|---|---|---|---|---|---|
| Unity Party (UP) | 1 | 3 | 4 | 4 | 4 |
| Independents | | | 3 | 1 | 3 |
| Congress for Democratic Change (CDC) | | | 3 | 2 | 2 |
| Liberty Party (LP) | | | 3 | | 2 |
| National Patriotic Party (NPP) | | 21 | 3 | 4 | 1 |
| National Democratic Coalition (NDC) | | | | 1 | 1 |
| Alternative National Congress (ANC) | | | | | 1 |
| People's Unification Party (PUP) | | | | | 1 |
| Alliance for Peace and Democracy (APD) | | | 3 | 1 | |
| Liberia Destiny Party (LDP) | | | | 1 | |
| National Union for Democratic Progress (NUDP) | | | | 1 | |
| Coalition for the Transformation of Liberia (COTOL) | | | 7 | | |
| National Democratic Party of Liberia (NDPL) | 22 | | 2 | | |
| All Liberia Coalition Party (ALCOP) | | 2 | 1 | | |
| National Reformation Party (NRP) | | | 1 | | |
| Liberian Action Party (LAP) | 2 | | | | |
| Liberia Unification Party (LUP) | 1 | | | | |
| Grand Total | 26 | 26 | 30 | 15 | 15 |

== Historical incidents ==
The Legislature has exhibited its powers in many cases and sometimes to the level of impeaching the President. During 1871, E.J. Roye was the President and after his deposition, Vice President James Smith was impeached by the House of Representatives to prevent another dark skinned President. In 1900, the House of Representatives, Liberian Senate and the cabinet opposed to the interior policies of the President Coleman, who resigned. Experts believe that Liberian legislature was truly democratic until 1944, the era of President William Tubman. Tubman is accused of allowing illiterate members in the branch of the government, who acceded to all the demands of the President and were unaware of their power and responsibilities. Most of the candidates were chieftains, who were not elected based on popular vote. The amendment to constitution seeking representation for provinces made during May 1946 was seen as a measure to further dilute the powers of legislature. There were many cases of corruption against the President who became affluent and could attract candidates with money. There were a lot of cases where opposing candidates were asked to resign or expelled from the legislature.

In December 2024, a fire broke out at the legislature building amid the attempted removal of House Speaker Jonathan F. Koffa.

== See also ==
- Politics of Liberia
