= River Gee-1 =

Electoral district in Liberia

- Constituency for the House of Representatives of Liberia
- Electorate: 12,008 (2023)

Current constituency
- Representative: Alexander Poure

River Gee-1 is an electoral district for the elections to the House of Representatives of Liberia. It is located in an eastern portion of River Gee County, bordering Grand Gedeh, Sinoe, Rivercess, and Grand Kru counties.

== Elected representatives ==
| Year | Representative elected | Party | Notes |
|---|---|---|---|
| 2005 | Charles K. Bardyl | CDC | |
| 2011 | Johnson T. Chea | NDC | |
| 2017 | Alexander Poure | ALP | |
| 2023 | Alexander Poure | CDC | |
