= Montserrado-17 =

Electoral district in Liberia

- Constituency for the House of Representatives of Liberia
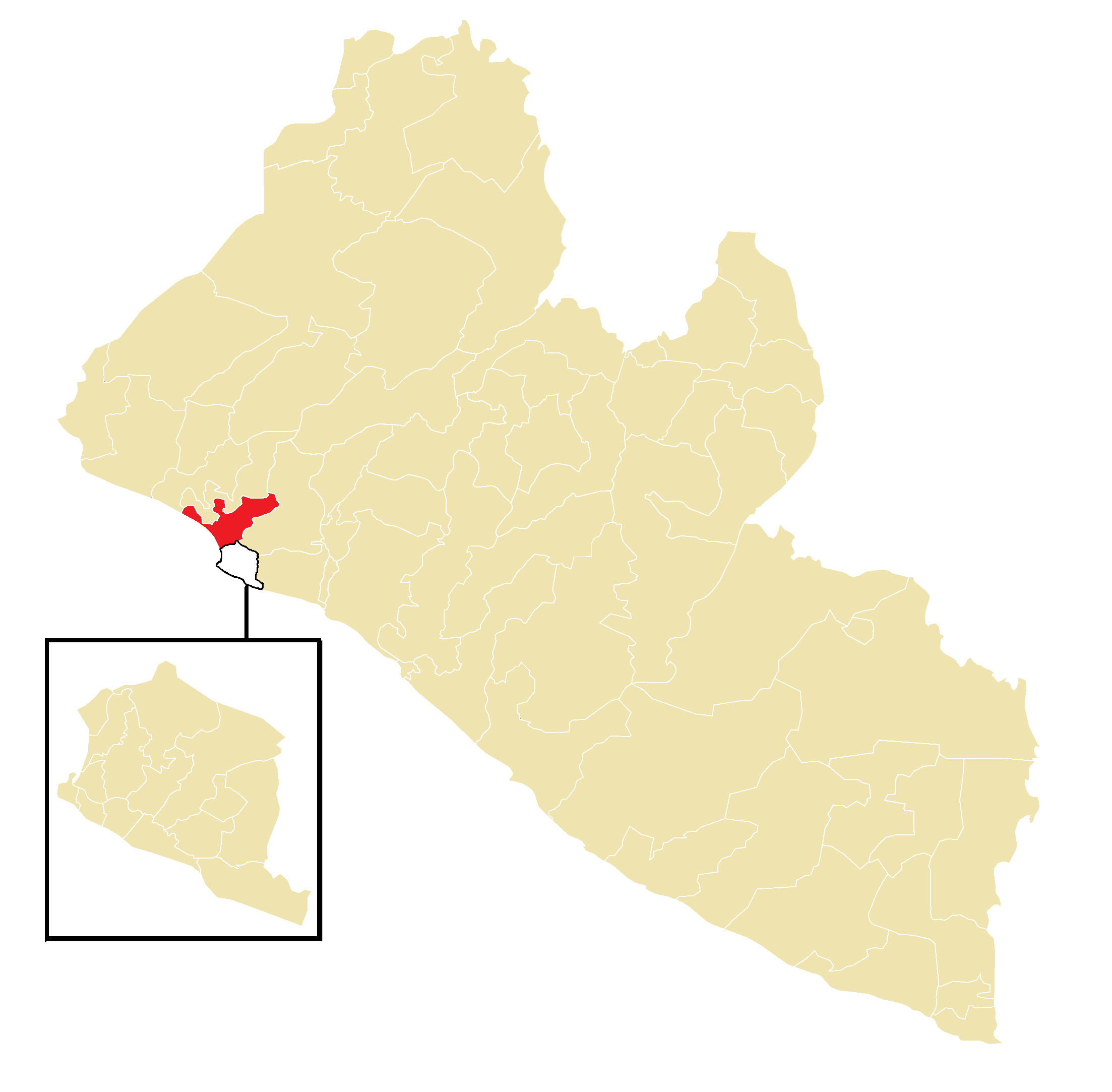
- Electorate: 73,153 (2023)

Current constituency
- Created: 2011
- Representative: Bernard Blue Benson

Montserrado-17 is an electoral district for the elections to the House of Representatives of Liberia. The district covers the St. Paul River District.

== Elected representatives ==
Year	Representative elected	Party	Notes
2011	William V. Dakel, Sr.	NDC	
2017	Hanson Kiazolu	UP	
2023	Bernard Blue Benson	CDC	
