= Sinoe-1 =

Electoral district in Liberia

- Constituency for the House of Representatives of Liberia
- Electorate: 20,783 (2023)

Current constituency
- Representative: Thomas Romeo Quioh

Sinoe-1 is an electoral district for the elections to the House of Representatives of Liberia. It is located in a south-western portion of Sinoe County, encompassing part of the coast.

== Elected representatives ==
Year	Representative elected	Party	Notes
2005	Nelson Wah Barh	UDA	
2011	Jefferson S. Kanmoh	APD	
2017	Crayton Oldman Duncan	UP	
2023	Thomas Romeo Quioh	NDC	
