= Sinoe-3 =

Electoral district in Liberia

- Constituency for the House of Representatives of Liberia
- Electorate: 16,357 (2023)

Current constituency
- Representative: Alex S. Noah

Sinoe-3 is an electoral district for the elections to the House of Representatives of Liberia. It is located in a western portion of Sinoe County, bordering Grand Gedeh and Rivercess counties.

== Elected representatives ==
Year	Representative elected	Party	Notes
2005	Jefferson Seykonmuh Kanmoh	APD	
2011	Nelson Wah Barh	UP	Died in office.
2012	Matthew G. Zarzar	UP	
2017	Matthew G. Zarzar	UP	
2023	Alex S. Noah	CDC	
