= Janga Augustus Kowo =

Liberian politician

Janga Augustus Kowo (born December 18, 1974) is the acting National Chair of the Congress for Democratic Change, Liberia's former governing political party. He previously served as National Secretary General and Vice Chair for Legal and Governmental Affairs before ascending to the Chairmanship of the CDC in March 2024.

A political activist and trained financial manager, before becoming Secretary General of the CDC, he served as Chief Financial officer of the General Auditing Commission of Liberia from 2007 to 2012. Before then, he worked at Liberia's Post war Truth and Reconciliation Commission as Deputy Coordinator for Montserrado County.

Janga Augustus Kowo is the former Comptroller and Accountant General of Liberia. He was appointed in January 2018 after the victory of President George Manneh Weah in December 2017.

He was Secretary of the Joint Presidential Transition Team (JPTT) representing the Coalition for Democratic Change, after its victory in the 2017 General and Presidential Elections.

He is also a veteran former Student Leader and activist serving as President of the Liberia National Student Union LINSU from 2004 to 2009.

Educationally, he holds Bachelor of Law (LLB) from the University of Liberia's Louis Arthur Grimes School of Law, MBA from Maharishi International University (MIU), in Fairfield, IOWA- USA and a Bachelor of Business Administration (BBA) from the University of Liberia.
