= House of Representatives (Liberia) =

Lower house of Liberian legislature

Coordinates: 6°18′06″N 10°47′45″W

- 55th Liberian Legislature

Type
- Type: Lower house

Leadership
- Speaker: Richard Koon, UP since 21 November 2024

Structure
- Seats: 73
- Political groups: CDC (25); Unity (11); Liberty (6); MDR (4); PUP (2); ALP (1); LNU (1); LTP (1); MPC (1); LRP (1); NDC (1); Independents (19)

Elections
- Voting system: First-past-the-post
- Last election: 10 October 2023

Meeting place
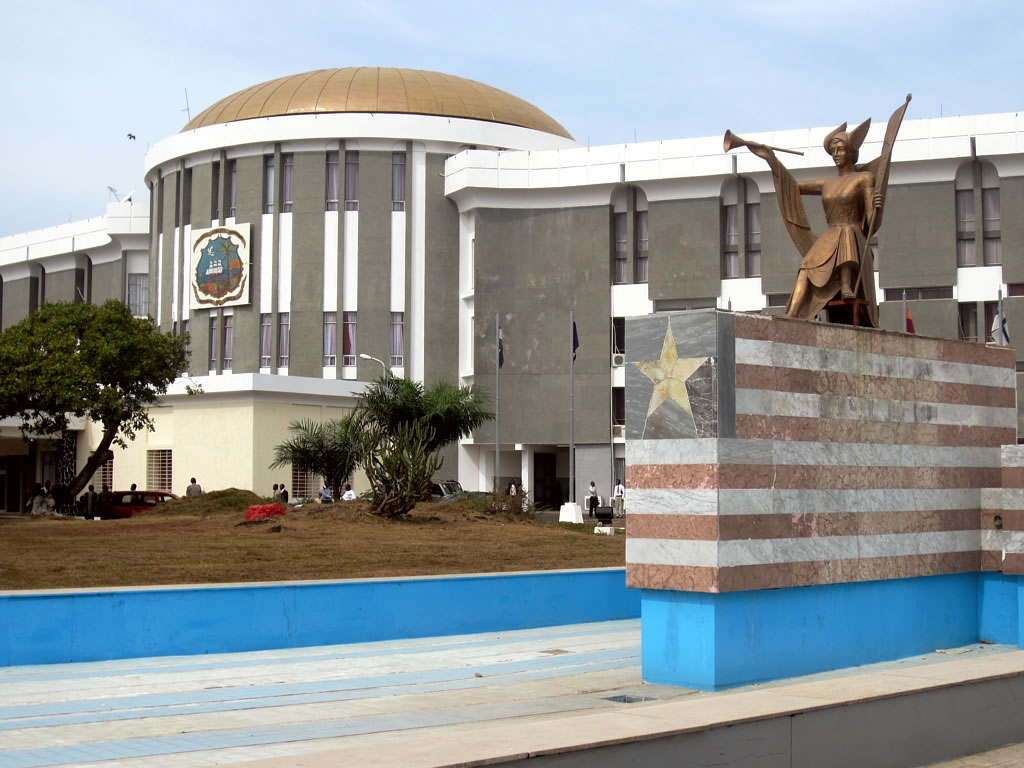
- Capitol Building, Monrovia

Website
- https://archive.today/20121219233214/http://legislature.gov.lr/house

The House of Representatives is the lower chamber of the bicameral legislative branch of Liberia, and together with the Senate comprises the Legislature of Liberia. The number of seats is fixed by law at 73, with each county being apportioned a number of seats based on its percentage of the national population. House members represent single-member districts within the counties drawn up by the National Elections Commission and serve six-year terms. The House meets at the Capitol Building in Monrovia.

The primary purpose of the House is to pass bills in conjunction with the Senate so that they may be sent to the president for signature or veto. The House also holds the exclusive right to introduce revenue bills into the Legislature, as well as to impeach the president, the vice president and judges upon the concurrence of two-thirds of its members. The House is led by the Speaker of the House, elected at the beginning of each new legislature from among its members only.

== Membership ==
=== Eligibility ===
Article 30 of the Constitution sets four requirements for members of the House: 1) they must possess Liberian citizenship, 2) must be at least twenty-five years old, 3) must have been domiciled in the district which they represent for at least one year prior to their election, and 4) must be a taxpayer. Under the 1847 Constitution, House members were required to own a certain value of real estate within their district, which in effect limited the ability of indigenous citizens to be elected to the House. Property ownership as a requirement for election was eliminated in the current Constitution.

=== Seat apportionment ===
Seats in the House are apportioned among the counties of Liberia in proportion to their percentage of the population according to the national census, with each county being guaranteed a minimum of two seats. Article 80(d) of the Constitution states, "Each constituency shall have an approximately equal population of 20,000, or such number of citizens as the legislature shall prescribe in keeping with population growth." Furthermore, the Constitution limits the number of House seats that the Legislature may create to 100. Currently, the number of seats is set at 73, averaging approximately 55,000 citizens per seat.

The National Elections Commission is responsible for reapportioning the seats among the counties following the conclusion of the national census every ten years. Under Article 80(e) of the Constitution, the National Elections Commission is also required to redraw the constituencies within each county at the same time as reapportionment in order to ensure that all of the constituencies are as equal in population as possible. House districts must be wholly contained within a single county.

The current seat distribution among the counties is as follows:

- Bomi – 3
- Bong – 7
- Gbarpolu – 3
- Grand Bassa – 5
- Grand Cape Mount – 3
- Grand Gedeh – 3
- Grand Kru – 2
- Lofa – 5
- Margibi – 5
- Maryland – 3
- Montserrado – 17
- Nimba – 9
- River Gee – 3
- Rivercess – 2
- Sinoe – 3

=== Elections ===
Article 83(b) of the 1985 Constitution originally established a two-round system for House elections, whereby if no candidate received a majority of the vote, a second election contested by the two candidates with the highest number of votes was held one month later. The Accra Peace Accord temporarily suspended this provision for the 2005 legislative elections, which utilized the first-past-the-post (FPTP) voting system. The by-elections held between 2006 and 2011 to fill vacant House seats reverted to the two-round system. However, Article 83(b) was amended by referendum in 2011 to require FPTP voting in all future legislative elections.

=== Term ===
Representatives serve a term of six years, with no limit on the number of times a representative may be reelected. The 1847 Constitution originally set House terms at two years, though this was increased to four years by referendum in 1905. Under the draft version of the 1985 Constitution, representatives would have served four-year terms, though this was changed to six years by the People's Redemption Council prior to the Constitution's ratification in 1985.

=== Oath ===
The Constitution requires all representatives to take an oath or affirmation upon assuming their office. The following oath is specified by the Constitution:

I, ___ , do solemnly swear that I will support, uphold, protect and defend the Constitution and Laws of the Republic of Liberia and bear true faith and allegiance to the Republic and will faithfully, conscientiously and impartially discharge the duties and functions of the office of the Honorable House of Representatives, to the best of my ability. So help me God.

=== Midterm vacancies ===
The House is required to notify the National Elections Commission within 30 days of a vacancy due to a representative's death, resignation, incapacity, or expulsion. The NEC then carries out a by-election within 90 days of such notification to fill the vacancy. Representatives elected in a by-election are only elected to serve the remainder of their predecessor's term.

== Duties ==
=== Legislation ===
Bills may originate in either the House or the Senate, though the House is granted exclusive power under Article 34(d)(i) of the Constitution to introduce revenue bills into the Legislature. Bills originating in the House, including revenue bills, may be amended by the Senate and sent back to the House. Both chambers are required to pass the same bill in order for it to be sent to the president for signature or veto. If differences exist in the two versions passed by the House and the Senate, a conference committee made up of members of both chambers may be formed to negotiate a single bill for passage by the chambers.

=== Checks and balances ===
The Constitution grants the House the sole power to impeach the president, the vice president and judges upon the concurrence of two-thirds of its members. Furthermore, the House must, along with Senate, approve any treaties or other international agreements signed by the president. Should the president veto any bill passed by the House and the Senate, the veto may be overturned by a vote of two-thirds of the members in each chamber.

== Structure ==
=== Sessions ===
The House holds one regular session every year, beginning on the second working Monday of January and ending on August 31, with a two-week break for Easter. Under Article 32(b) of the Constitution, the House, by concurrence of one-fourth of its members and one-fourth of the members of the Senate, or the president, on his or her own initiative, may extend the session past its adjournment or call for an extraordinary session outside of the regular session. Plenary sessions are held every Tuesday and Thursday, with committees meeting on Monday and Wednesday.

=== Leadership ===
At the convocation of each new legislature, the representatives elect a Speaker of the House from among their members to preside over the House. The House also elects a Deputy Speaker, who presides over the House in the absence of the Speaker. Both the Speaker and the Deputy Speaker serve for the entire term of the Legislature and may be removed from their positions by the concurrence of two-thirds of the representatives. In the event of a vacancy in the speakership, the Deputy Speaker serves as Speaker until the election of a replacement within sixty days.

=== Committees ===
Article 38 of the Constitution empowers both houses of the Legislature to create both committees and sub-committees, with the only caveat being that the Committee on Ways, Means, Finance and Budget is required to consist of one representative from each county. The Speaker appoints all chairpersons and members of the House's committees. In the 52nd Legislature, the thirty-three standing committees were:

- Committee on Peace, Religious and National Reconciliation
- Committee on Claims and Petitions
- Committee on Gender Equity and Child Development
- Committee on State Enterprises, Commissions, Public Autonomous Agencies and Utilities
- Committee on Planning and Economic Affairs
- Committee on Executive
- Committee on Foreign Affairs
- Committee on Judiciary
- Committee on Ways, Means and Finance
- Committee on Rules, Order and Administration
- Committee on Public Accounts and Expenditure
- Committee on National Security
- Committee on Lands, Natural Resources and Environment
- Committee on Commerce and Industries
- Committee on Elections and Inauguration
- Committee on Transport
- Committee on Education and Public Administration
- Committee on Maritime Affairs
- Committee on Banking and Currency
- Committee on National Defense
- Committee on Good Governance and Government Reform
- Committee on Agriculture, Forestry and Fisheries
- Committee on Internal Affairs
- Committee on Public Works
- Committee on Post and Telecommunication
- Committee on Resettlement, Repatriation, Relief and Readjustment
- Committee on Information, Broadcasting, Culture and Tourism
- Committee on Youth and Sport
- Committee on Investment and Concessions
- Committee on Human and Civil Rights
- Committee on Rural Development
- Committee on Contracts, Monopolies and Public Procurement Commission
- Committee on Health Care and Social Welfare

== Current representatives ==
County/District	Name	Party	Year elected	Notes
Bomi-1	Jahkpakpa Obediah Varney	UP	2023	
Bomi-2	Manah Bishop Johnson	UP	2017	
Bomi-3	Sam P. Jallah	IND	2023	
Bong-1	Prince K. Koinah	IND	2023	
Bong-2	James M. Kolleh	PUP	2021	
Bong-3	J. Marvin Cole	CDC	2017	
Bong-4	Robert Womba	UP	2017	
Bong-5	Eugine J. M. Kollie	CDC	2023	
Bong-6	Moima Briggs Mensah	IND	2017	
Bong-7	Foday E. Fahnbulleh	IND	2023	
Gbarpolu-1	Zinnah A. Norman	CDC	2023	
Gbarpolu-2	Luther S. Collins	IND	2023	
Gbarpolu-3	Mustapha Waritay	UP	2023	
Grand Bassa-1	Isaac G. Bannie	MPC	2023	
Grand Bassa-2	J. Clarence T. Banks	IND	2023	
Grand Bassa-3	Matthew Joe	CDC	2017	
Grand Bassa-4	Alfred H. Flomo	UP	2023	
Grand Bassa-5	Thomas A. Goshua II	CPP	2017	
Grand Cape Mount-1	Bintu Massalay	CDC	2023	
Grand Cape Mount-2	Mohammed Dosii	IND	2023	
Grand Cape Mount-3	Gbessie Sonni Feika	VOLT	2023	
Grand Gedeh-1	Jeremiah Garwo Sokan Sr.	IND	2024	
Grand Gedeh-2	Marie G. Johnson	LRP	2023	
Grand Gedeh-3	Jacob C. Debee II	LINU	2023	
Grand Kru-1	Nathaniel N. Bahway Sr.	CPP	2017	
Grand Kru-2	Jonathan Fonati Koffa	CDC	2017	
Lofa-1	Thomas P. Fallah	CDC	2005	Fallah was elected in 2005 and 2011 to represent Montseraddo-7, and in 2017 to represent Montseraddo-5.
Lofa-2	Julie Fatorma Wiah	CDC	2015	
Lofa-3	Momo Siafa Kpoto	CDC	2023	
Lofa-4	Gizzie K. Kollince	UP	2023	
Lofa-5	Augustine B. Chiewolo	UP	2023	
Margibi-1	Roland O. Cooper	LP	2023	Cooper was elected in 2011 but was not re-elected in 2017.
Margibi-2	Ivar K. Jones	CDC	2017	
Margibi-3	Ellen A. Attoh-Wreh	IND	2017	
Margibi-4	Emmanuel Yarh	CDC	2023	
Margibi-5	Clarence G. Gahr	CDC	2017	
Maryland-1	P. Mike Jurry	CDC	2017	
Maryland-2	Anthony F. Williams	CPP	2023	
Maryland-3	Austin Blidi Taylor	IND	2023	
Montserrado-1	Rugie Yatu Barry	CPP	2023	
Montserrado-2	Sekou S. Kanneh	UP	2023	Kanneh was elected in 2011 but was not re-elected in 2017.
Montserrado-3	Sumo Kollie Mulbah	ALP	2023	
Montserrado-4	Michael M. Thomas	IND	2023	
Montserrado-5	Prescilla A. Cooper	UP	2023	
Montserrado-6	Samuel R. Enders	IND	2017	
Montserrado-7	Emmanuel Dahn	IND	2023	
Montserrado-8	Prince A. Toles	UP	2023	
Montserrado-9	Frank Saah Foko Jr.	CDC	2020	
Montserrado-10	Yekeh Y. Kolubah	IND	2017	
Montserrado-11	Richard Nagbe Koon	UP	2017	
Montserrado-12	Jerry K. Yogboh	IND	2023	
Montserrado-13	Edward P. Flomo	CDC	2018	
Montserrado-14	Kerkula Muka Kamara	CDC	2023	
Montserrado-15	Abu Bana Kamara	CDC	2019	
Montserrado-16	Dixon W. Seboe	CDC	2017	
Montserrado-17	Bernard Blue Benson	CDC	2023	
Nimba-1	Samuel N. Brown Sr.	IND	2021	
Nimba-2	Nyahn Garsaye Flomo	CPP	2023	
Nimba-3	Nehker E. Gaye	MDR	2023	
Nimba-4	Ernest M. Manseah Sr.	MDR	2023	
Nimba-5	Kortor Kwagrue	MDR	2025	
Nimba-6	Dorwohn Twain Gleekia	MDR	2017	
Nimba-7	Musa Hassan Bility	CMC (Note: Bility was elected on the CPP ticket in 2023. He helped found the Citizens Movement for Change in 2025.)	2023	
Nimba-8	Saye S. Mianah	MDR	2023	
Nimba-9	Taa Wongbe	IND	2023	
River Gee-1	Alexander Poure	CDC	2017	
River Gee-2	Isaac B. Choloplay Wuo	CDC	2023	
River Gee-3	Johnson S. N. Williams Sr.	CDC	2023	
Rivercess-1	Alex J. Grant	IND	2023	
Rivercess-2	Steve Tequah	IND	2023	
Sinoe-1	Thomas Romeo Quioh	NDC	2023	
Sinoe-2	Samson Quejue Wiah	CDC	2020	
Sinoe-3	Alex S. Noah	CDC	2023	

== See also ==
- List of speakers of the House of Representatives of Liberia
- National Transitional Legislative Assembly of Liberia – the country's unicameral legislative body during the transition period (October 2003-January 2006)
