= Union of Liberian Democrats =

Political party in Liberia

The Union of Liberian Democrats (ULD) is a political party in Liberia. The ULD ran candidates in the 2005 Liberian elections, including presidential candidate Robert Kpoto, but would fail to win any seats in the Senate or House of Representatives, and subsequently coming in last in the presidential election.

The 2011 Liberian general election was held on 11 October 2011 which Jonathan A. Mason ran on the ULD ticket but failed to win the presidential seat. Mason got 2,645 votes, which was 0.2% of the vote. The party came in last place in the presidential election.

Francis Nyumalin was elected on the ULD ticket in a by-election in Lofa County's 1st House district on February 28, 2017. Soon after his victory, Nyumalin endorsed Unity Party (UP) candidate, Vice President Joseph Boakai, for president in the 2017 general election, against the wishes of the ULD. The ULD later endorsed Boakai as well. Nyumalin successfully won re-election with the UP in the 2017 general election.

The party joined the Coalition for Democratic Change for the 2023 general election, running joint candidates for the parliament and supporting George Weah for the presidency.
