= New Deal Movement =

Political party in Liberia

The New Deal Movement (NDM) is a political party in Liberia. In the 2005 general election, the presidential candidate of the party, George Klay Kieh, Jr. and his running mate Alaric Tokpa won 0.5% of the votes, while the Party received 3.62% of the vote, good for three seats in the House of Representatives of Liberia.
