= National Union for Democratic Progress =

Political party in Liberia

- Abbreviation: NUDP
- Founder: Prince Johnson
- Founded: September 2010
- Dissolved: c. 2015
- Preceded by: Independent National Patriotic Front of Liberia
- Succeeded by: Movement for Democracy and Reconstruction
- Colours: Magenta; White; Green
- Slogan: Dawn of a New Era

The National Union for Democratic Progress (NUDP) was a political party in Liberia.

== History ==
The NUDP was certified by the National Elections Commission (NEC) in September 2010. It was founded by Prince Yormie Johnson, Senator for Nimba County and former head of the rebel Independent National Patriotic Front of Liberia, to contest the 2011 presidential and legislative elections. Initially, Senator Abel Massalay was to serve as Johnson's running mate, but after failing to visit his residence during Johnson's illness, Massalay was dismissed. James Laveli Supuwood would later be selected as running mate. Johnson received 139,786 votes, 11.6% of the total. The NUDP came in third in the presidential election, behind the Congress for Democratic Change (CDC).

In the 2011 legislative elections, NUDP candidate Thomas Semandahn Grupee won the Nimba County seat in the Senate. This resulted in the NUDP having two members in the Senate in total. NUDP candidates won six seats in the House of Representatives. Each seat was in Nimba County. The following won the electoral districts numbers 1 through 6 respectively: Jeremiah Kpan Koung, Prince O. S. Tokpah, Samuel G. Z. Woleh, Garrison Yealue Jr., Samuel Gongben Kogar, and Ricks Yeah Toweh.

In the second round of the 2011 presidential election, Johnson endorsed incumbent president and Unity Party nominee Ellen Johnson Sirleaf. In early November 2011, the executive committee for the NUDP, led by Chairman Gbawou Kowou, expelled Johnson. Kowou accused Johnson of supporting Sirleaf unilaterally, without the consent of the executive committee. The executive committee had supported the opposing CDC's presidential candidate, Winston Tubman. Kowou further accused Johnson of criminal behavior. Johnson did not accept his expulsion from the party and maintained that he was still standard bearer. A complaint was filed with the NEC by Kowou's faction against Johnson. NEC ruled in favor of Johnson, as according to The New Dawn Liberia, the Kowou faction "did not submit the constitution acted upon to the Elections Commission to support plaintiff’s arguments." The ruling brought the party back to status quo, with Johnson as standard bearer.

By May 2012, following the NEC's advice, the Kowou faction wanted to hold a party convention to resolve the leadership crisis. Kowou's faction claimed they would hold a convention in July in Grand Gedeh County. Johnson's faction claimed the Kowou faction was suspended and illegitimate. The Johnson faction further said they instead would hold a convention in Ganta in June. Following the NEC's ruling, both factions had their own executive committees claiming to be the NUDP leadership.

In May 2013, Johnson claimed to resign from the NUDP. Soon after, he claimed he was joking. The NUDP convention was held in late June 2013 in Buchanan. Despite the use of scare tactics and threats of violence against the convention by Johnson, the convention was uninterrupted. Johnson did not attend the convention, signalling Johnson's departure from the party. The convention elected Representative Ricks Toweh as acting standard bearer, replacing Johnson.

After his leaving the NUDP, Johnson won re-election to the Senate in 2014 as an independent. By May 2014, the NEC had filed a petition to have 20 political parties, including the NUDP, de-certificated. The NUDP was accused of not meeting the standard for submitting statements to the NEC detailing the assets and liabilities of the party and its candidates. It was additionally accused of knowingly submitting false or misleading statements. By November 2015, the NEC delisted the NUDP as a registered political party. In May 2016, the Movement for Democracy and Reconstruction was certified by the NEC. This was a new party founded by Senator Johnson.

== Election results ==
=== Presidential elections ===
Election	Candidate	Votes	%	Votes	%	Result
Election	Candidate	First round		Second round		Result
2011	Prince Johnson	139,786	11.58%	-	-	Lost ✗

=== Senate elections ===
Election	Votes	%	Seats	+/–	Position
2011	51,494	4.30	2 / 30	New	▲5th

=== House of Representatives elections ===
Election	Votes	%	Seats	+/–	Position
2011	50,010	4.20	6 / 73	New	▲6th
