= All Liberian Party =

Political party in Liberia

- Abbreviation: ALP
- Leader: Benoni Urey
- Senate seats: 1 / 30
- House seats: 1 / 73

The All Liberian Party (ALP) is a political party in Liberia.

== History ==
The ALP was certified by the National Elections Commission on August 7, 2015. Benoni Urey served as the first standard bearer of the party. Urey is a businessman who previously served as President Charles Taylor's head of Bureau of Maritime Affairs. At the time of the party's founding, he served as chair of LoneStar Communications Corporation, one of Liberia’s largest cell phone companies. In June 2016, Emmanuel Lomax, the first chairman of the ALP, resigned from the party. In November 2016, Bomi County Senator Sando D. Johnson, a founding member of the National Patriotic Party, joined the ALP.

In August 2016, the ALP along with 11 other opposition political parties, signed a communique in Ganta to work together against the ruling Unity Party (UP) in the 2017 general election. Urey contested the 2017 presidential election for the ALP, with Alexander Nyonkon Duopu serving as his running mate. The ALP ticket received 24,246 votes, 1.6% of the total. Following the first round of the election, the ALP submitted a complaint, alleging irregularity. The Liberty Party (LP) submitted a complaint of its own. The UP joined in the complaint. The complaint received support from the ALP and the Alternative National Congress (ANC). All complaints were ruled against due to lack of evidence. Duopu broke ranks with the rest of the ALP, supporting Coalition for Democratic Change (CDC) nominee George Weah's candidacy. Duopu disliked Urey's change of position on Joseph Boakai and the UP, and he wanted to align himself with Nimba County Senator Prince Johnson's position.

In the 2017 House of Representatives elections, the ALP ran 61 candidates. Three were successful: Albert B. Hills Jr. (Bong-1), Joseph P. Kolleh (Bong-7), and Alexander Poure (River Gee-1).

As early as 2018, the ALP got involved in founding a political party alliance known as the Collaborating Political Parties (CPP). The other constituent parties were the UP, the ANC, and the LP. The leaders of the four parties signed a memorandum of understanding on February 21, 2019, establishing formal collaboration between the organizations. It established Urey as the alliance's first chairman. A framework document for the alliance was signed by the four parties in May 2020. ANC leader Alexander B. Cummings was elected chairman following the signing of the framework. The goal of the CPP, as outlined in the framework, was to present a single candidate to for all elections between and including the 2023 general election. On August 14, 2020, the CPP was certified by the NEC. In the 2020 Senate election, the ruling CDC had ten losing candidates, with the CPP gaining six seats, the most of any party. Dagbayonoh Kiah Nyanfore II of ModernGhana claims infighting among the constituent parties cost the CPP Senate seats. Senator Sando Johnson attempted re-election with the CPP, but was defeated.

In September 2021, Urey accused Cummings of tampering with the framework document ahead of the CPP primaries. Cummings denied the allegation. UP leader Boakai joined in the accusation, along with CPP chairwoman Senator Nyonblee Karnga-Lawrence. Urey alleged that the three leaders, besides Cummings, were never given the original framework document. He alleged they were given a photocopy of the framework document, not the original, and that the signature page was later affixed to the original. On December 23, 2021, the ALP Executive Committee held a meeting where they deliberated on the issue of leaving the CPP. The committee voted to withdraw from the alliance. The ALP also noted it would seek legal action in regard to the alleged tampering of the CPP framework document. On February 16, 2022, Boakai announced the withdrawal of the UP from the CPP. The legal case brought against Cummings by the ALP and UP was later dropped by state prosecutors due to lack of evidence.

In December 2022, Urey was re-elected as standard bearer of the ALP. The ALP did not contest the presidency in the 2023 general election. Ahead of the election, the party endorsed the UP candidate Boakai. Urey remained an ally of Boakai following the collapse of the CPP until Boakai announced his running mate to be the Movement for Democracy and Reconstruction's Jeremiah Koung. Following a meeting between Urey and Boakai where Boakai could not be convinced to change his running mate, Urey began to support the CDC's George Weah. The ALP's National Executive Committee voted against a resolution to endorse Weah on September 22, 2023. Regardless, on October 29, ahead of the runoff election, Urey hosted an ALP event endorsing Weah's re-election. ALP Chairman Theodore Momo condemned Urey's endorsement, as it did not reflect the opinion of the majority of the ALP's leadership.

In the 2023 legislative elections, the ALP contested the Senate and the House. Mohammed A. Nasser unsuccessfully contested the Senate in Bong County. Of the three representatives from the 2017 election, two were not re-elected, and Rep. Poure was re-elected under the CDC banner. Sumo K. Mulbah was elected in Montserrado's 3rd House district.
