= Movement for Progressive Change =

Political party in Liberia

The Movement for Progressive Change (MPC) is a political party in Liberia.

== History ==
The MPC contested the 2011 presidential election. Their nominee was Simeon C. M. Freeman, alongside running mate Cyrus Cromah. After a failed referendum in August to shorten the residency requirements for presidential candidates, the MPC filed a legal challenge against six other presidential candidates, including incumbent president Ellen Johnson Sirleaf, on grounds they were ineligible to run due to failing to meet the unchanged residency requirements. The case was dismissed by the Supreme Court of Liberia on October 5. Freeman received 5,559 votes, 0.5% of the total. In the legislature, the MPC won no seats in the Senate, but two in the House of Representatives. Numene T. H. Bartekwa was elected in Grand Kru County's 2nd House district and Alex Chersia Grant won in Grand Gedeh County's 3rd House district.

The MPC again unsuccessfully contested the Senate in the 2014 election. In the 2015 by-election in Rivercess County's 2nd House district, Byron W. Zahnwea was elected on the MPC ticket.

In early 2016, Freeman fled the country. He was facing legal charges of treason by the Sirleaf government after he had claimed the government was involved with the death of businessman Harry A. Greaves Jr. Freeman claimed that he himself was declared an enemy by the government. In June 2016, several MPC members left the party, joining the Alternative National Congress, due to the group's lack of confidence in the leadership of the MPC. The government dropped all charged against Freeman while he was out of the country. He returned to the country in December.

In the 2017 election, Freeman again contested the presidency, alongside running mate William T. Knowlden. According to Rodney Sieh of FrontPage Africa, Freeman was among the harshest critics of the Sirleaf government running, advocating a smaller government and a prioritization of the private sector as a means of economic growth. Freeman received 6,682 votes, 0.4% of the total. In the legislative elections, the MPC saw no victories in 2017. Rep. Grant won re-election under the Coalition for Democratic Change banner, Rep. Zahnwea won re-election under the Unity Party banner, and Jonathan Fonati Koffa won Grand Kru County's 2nd House district.

By September 30, 2020, Nimba County Senator Thomas Grupee switched party allegiance from the Unity Party to the MPC. In the Senate election that year, Senator Grupee was defeated for re-election by Jeremiah Koung. No MPC candidates were elected. By September 20, 2022, Q. Somah Paygai, who served as the running mate on the National Patriotic Party ticket in the 2005 presidential election had become a member of the MPC.

In May 2023, ahead of the presidential election that year, Freeman announced his running mate to be James Kollie Barclay. Freeman received 13,205 votes, 0.72% of the votes. The MPC again won no seats in the Senate. In the House, Isaac G. Bannie was elected to Grand Bassa County's 1st district.
