= Movement for Economic Empowerment =

Political party in Liberia

The Movement for Economic Empowerment (MOVEE) is a political party in Liberia. It is a part of the Coalition for Democratic Change.

== History ==
MOVEE was certificated by the National Elections Commission (NEC) on September 24, 2015. In September 2016, six founding members of MOVEE defected to the Alternative National Congress. They claimed to be members of an organ of the party known as the Elders Council. Among reasons cited for leaving were a lack of policy from MOVEE, as well as an allegation that the party was being run in an unconstitutional manner. The vice chairman of MOVEE, Robert Sammy, responded, explaining there was no Elders Council, and refuted claims of unconstitutionality.

In August 2016, MOVEE along with 11 other opposition political parties, signed a communique in Ganta to work together against the ruling Unity Party (UP) in the 2017 general election. In the 2017, J. Mills Jones contested the presidency with MOVEE. He was a former executive at the International Monetary Fund from Sinoe County who had resigned as governor of the Central Bank of Liberia in March 2016 to run. In March 2017, a ruling by the Supreme Court of Liberia upheld a 2014 law, the National Code of Conduct, which had potential effects on the eligibility of Jones for the presidency. The law prevented presidential appointees from engaging in political activities. Specifically, canvassing votes for ones own campaign could only be done if the appointee resigned two years before the election in question. In response, MOVEE stated that Jones would be running regardless of the implications of the ruling. The NEC, in an attempt to abide by the court's ruling, initially prevented 24 candidates from running, including Jones, though later it would later overturn most of the rejections, again including Jones'.

In June 2017, Jones named Samuel B. Reeves Jr., pastor of Providence Baptist Church, as his running mate. The MOVEE presidential ticket received 12,854 votes, 0.8% of the total. Reeves resigned as vice standard bearer of MOVEE after the election. MOVEE blamed the Code of Conduct debacle for its poor showing and had questioned the integrity of the election. In the subsequent run-off election, MOVEE supported the Coalition for Democratic Change (CDC). In the 2017 House of Representatives elections, MOVEE ran 62 candidates. Francis Saywon Young was elected in River Gee County's 2nd House district. In December 2017, the party's National Executive Committee suspended Jones indefinitely following an allegation of burglary and assault. Shortly after, Jones resigned from the party.

In early 2020, a convention was to be held to replace party officers, however, the COVID-19 pandemic disrupted the party's functioning. The National Executive Committee in April passed a resolution making United Nations ambassador Dee Maxwell Saah Kemayah Sr., who had served as the party's chairman since March 2016, its political leader, and making Dan Saryee its chairman. In May 2020, MOVEE, along with 10 other political parties, signed a document to become part of the Rainbow Alliance (RA), with the goal of opposing the CDC in the 2023 election. The RA was certified by the NEC on August 31, 2020, with MOVEE as one of its 7 founding parties.

By September 2020, Kemayah had been appointed as foreign minister by President George Weah of the CDC. Before September 2022, Kemayah had been removed from the National Executive Committee. It was felt that his serving as ambassador to the UN prevented him from doing his duties in the role. He was elected as political leader again in September 2022.

MOVEE left the RA in October 2022. In February 2023, MOVEE signed a resolution to support President Weah's bid for a second term in the 2023 election. The resolution also declared MOVEE's intent of joining the CDC. In March 2023, MOVEE, along with 5 other political parties, signed a resolution officially joining the CDC. In September 2023, football player and couch James Debbah joined MOVEE.
