= Coalition for the Transformation of Liberia =

Political party alliance in Liberia

The Coalition for the Transformation of Liberia (COTOL) was a political coalition that was formed to contest the 2005 Liberian general election. Initially, COTOL consisted of the Liberian Action Party (LAP), Liberia Unification Party (LUP), People's Democratic Party of Liberia (PDPL), and the formerly dominant True Whig Party (TWP).

In the 2005 elections, the coalition's presidential candidate Varney Sherman placed 5th out of 22 candidates, winning 7.8% of the vote. He subsequently endorsed George Weah of the Congress for Democratic Change in the presidential run-off election.

COTOL was more successful in the concurrent legislative elections, winning seven Senate seats, the most of any single political party or coalition, and eight seats in the House of Representatives.

The PDPL withdrew in 2006, and the LAP and LUP merged with the ruling Unity Party in 2010, effectively ending the coalition.
