= National Democratic Coalition (Liberia) =

- Founded: 2011
- Ideology: Pan-Africanism; African socialism Social democracy Liberalism
- Political position: Centre-left to left-wing
- Seats in the Senate: 0 / 30
- Seats in the House: 1 / 73

The National Democratic Coalition (NDC) is a coalition of Liberian political parties formed in 2011 to contest the 2011 presidential and legislative elections. The original members of the coalition were the New Deal Movement (NDM), the National Patriotic Party (NPP), the National Democratic Party of Liberia (NDPL), the Liberian People's Party (LPP), the United People's Party (UPP), the Liberia Equal Rights Party (LERP), the Labor Party of Liberia (LPL). the Free Democratic Party (FDP), the Majority Party of Liberia (MAPOL) and the National Democratic Movement for Industrial Change (NADMIC).

On 12 February 2011, New Deal nominated Dew Mayson, a former Liberian ambassador and university professor, as its standard bearer, and NDC had been expected to nominate Mayson as its presidential candidate. However, New Deal suspended Mayson as its standard bearer on 6 July 2011 following for unspecified reasons, only to later reinstate him in less than a week later. Mayson later told reporters that there was an internal debate within the NDC over whether to contest the presidential election or to solely field candidates for the legislative elections. The day prior to the NDC's convention, the NPP and the NDPL withdrew from the coalition, and on 17 July, the remaining members of the coalition nominated Mayson as their presidential candidate.
