= National Patriotic Party =

Political party in Liberia

- Leader: Disputed; James Biney/Joe Mulbah
- Founded: 1997
- Preceded by: National Patriotic Front of Liberia
- Youth wing: National Patriotic Party Youth Council
- Women's wing: National Patriotic Party Woman's Wing
- Ideology: Nationalism; Militarism; Authoritarianism; Neopatrimonialism
- National affiliation: Coalition for Democratic Change
- Slogan: Liberty - Justice - Discipline - Work
- Seats in the Senate: 0 / 30
- Seats in the House: 0 / 73
- Pan African Parliament: 0 / 5

The National Patriotic Party (NPP) is a political party in Liberia. It was formed in 1997 by members of the National Patriotic Front of Liberia following the end of the First Liberian Civil War.

== History ==
The party contested the 1997 general election, with the NPFL's leader, Charles Taylor, serving as the party's presidential candidate. Taylor won the presidential election with 75% of the vote. The party also won 49 of 64 seats in the House of Representatives and 21 of 26 in the Senate. Due to domestic and international pressure as a result of the Second Liberian Civil War, Taylor stepped down as president in August 2003. In October of that year, Taylor's successor, Moses Blah, and the members of the Legislature resigned and ceded power to the National Transitional Government of Liberia.

The party later contested the 2005 general election. The party's presidential candidate was Roland Massaquoi, who earned 4.1% of the vote. The NPP also won four seats in the House of Representatives and another four in the Senate.

The party was a member of the Coalition for Democratic Change (CDC) during the 2011 Liberian general election, and joined the CDC's boycott of the runoff election in protest due to partisan politicians being named to the National Elections Commission (NEC) and demanding the resignation of NEC Chairman James Fromayan.

=== 2016 convention ===
The party's 2016 convention was held in Buchanan, Liberia. The main topic was the influence held by Jewel Howard-Taylor, who served in an official capacity as the party's "Standard Bearer." Prior to the convention she was able to negotiate a coalition with George Weah's CDC to see Taylor elected Vice President of Liberia during the 2017 Liberian general election. Additionally, she also organized a meeting to change the party's constitution, greatly enhancing her powers to basically rule the NPP by decree.

During the 2017 election it was found that Charles Taylor was continuing to guide the party via phone calls from prison. Weah and the NPP party structure denied this, stating that Charles Taylor has no influence over Weah, the NPP, or his ex-wife Jewel Howard-Taylor.

In 2018, party chairman James Biney, angered by Taylor's meddling with the party, issued a resolution expelling Taylor, as well as John Gray, who she installed as chairman, from the party, and recommending to George Weah to remove her from the position of Vice President. Biney has made it clear that his faction of the NPP is unhappy with their position in the CDC and the CDC's continued support of Taylor and her faction of the NPP as opposed to the legitimate faction and leadership of the NPP and threatened the CDC with their withdrawal. This has led to a split in many county affiliates, namely the Maryland County branch developing two rival leaderships, one supporting Taylor and another supporting Biney. In 2019 the CDC seriously considered removing Taylor from the office of vice president, with Mulbah Morlu, chairman of the Congress for Democratic Change suggesting she be replaced with the Minister of State for Presidential Affairs, Nathaniel McGill, however, backed off following backlash from the pro-Taylor NPP, namely chairwoman of the NPP's woman wing and Bong County superintendent Esther Walker, and the NPP Bong county chairman James Dorbor Sao and vice chairman for administration Paul Wheeler.

In 2020 Agnes Reeves Taylor, ex-wife of Charles Taylor, returned to Liberia after the dismissal of her war crime charges. Biney's NPP welcomed her return with a parade and a rally, championing her as the "true mother" of the NPP, and seeking to tap her for a leadership role to mitigate the influence of Jewel Howard-Taylor.

In 2021, following the sudden death of Emmanuel Barten Nyeswua, the Youth Council of the NPP, which are vocal and often militant supporters of Jewel-Taylor, petitioned George Weah to name a pro-Taylor member of the NPP, Clarence Williams, as chairman of the Internal Audit Agency to show unity between the NPP and CDC. Instead Weah named David A. Kemah, a non-partisan, as the new chairman.

=== 2022 convention and split ===
In 2022 the NEC ruled that Chairman Biney's term should have expired after his four year term in 2020, and that his tenure was without legitimacy. In response, Biney coordinated the party's 7th party convention in October in Paynesville, Liberia. Despite calls from the NEC to have the Biney and Taylor factions put their differences aside Democratically at the convention, Taylor and her supporters instead organized a rival convention. Inside the city hall Biney was re-elected as chairman, while the rival convention held outside by Jewel Howard-Taylor declared all seats in the party's executive to be vacant and elected Stanley Kparkillen as the new party chairman. A fight would break out between the two convention goers with at least one death. Taylor's faction of the party argued that as standard bearer, Taylor is the sole authority to vet and approve members of the party to participate in the Weah government, and shortly after the convention declared that the NPP would be supporting the CDC with Taylor again as Weah's running mate. Chairman Emeritus of the party, Chief Cyril Allen, denounced the 7th party convention as "complete gangsterism" and accused Taylor of paying attendees to sign a resolution against Biney and the NPP party structure. In March of 2022 the Supreme Court of Liberia found in favor of Biney, that Jewel Howard-Taylor had no official powers to call a party convention, and that the 2016 party constitution was declared null and void and that Biney is the rightful leader of the party.

The CDC has largely supported the attempted takeover of the party by Taylor's faction, with Weah's advisor on communications, Gabriel Nyenkan, arguing that the NPP should be grateful to the CDC for allowing them to participate in the government, and that the NPP as a stand alone political party "had become a striped frame of a vehicle and could bring nothing to the table." The Liberian government, despite the supreme court ruling, has recognized Taylor's faction as the party leadership.

In 2023 Taylor named Joe Mulbah as "acting chairman" of her faction of the NPP who suspended chairman James Biney from the party, who, in turn, nullified his own suspension and suspended Taylor and Mulbah. The cause of the renewed dispute is Biney's refusal to sign a resolution to commit the party to the Coalition for Democratic Change against the wishes of the party's executive committee, which Taylor argued is a violation of article 4 of the party's 2004 Constitution. However, Biney argued that Taylor had no authority to suspend the chairman, and that by attempting to do so violated article 5 of the party's 2004 Constitution and that Taylor and Mulbah were "convening an illegal and unconstitutional gathering." Biney has also gone on saying that the committee gathering to call for signing of the CDC resolution was illegitimate as meetings of the party's executive committee can only be called and presided over by the party chairman.

Shortly after the "suspension" of Biney, Taylor organized members of the NPP Youth Council to protest for a war crimes trail for Prince Johnson while he was purportedly giving a sermon against Taylor which prompted the congregation to evacuate out of fear of a violent escalation. In response Johnson began surrounding his church with armed supporters and threatened a violent response should Taylor continue to push for protests against him. Most opposition parties to the CDC used the event as an opportunity to criticize Taylor, Weah and the NPP as a whole.

== Electoral results ==
=== Presidential elections ===
Election	Candidate	First round		Second round		Result	Ref.
Election	Candidate	Votes	%	Votes	%	Result	Ref.
1997	Charles Taylor	468,443	75.33	—N/a		Elected ✓	
2005	Roland Massaquoi	40,361	4.14	—N/a		Lost ✗	
2011	Did not run						
2017	Did not run						

=== House elections ===
Election	Votes	%	Position	Seats	+/–	Government
1997	468,443	75.33	▲1st	49 / 64	New	Supermajority government
2005	78,751	8.42	▼5th	4 / 64	▼45	Opposition
2011	42,420	3.56	▼7th	3 / 64	▼1	Opposition
2017	239,754 (as part of CDC)	15.57	▲1st	21 / 73	▲15	Government
2023	401,921 (as part of CDC)	22.12	1st	25 / 73	▲4	Opposition

=== Senate elections ===
Election	Votes	%	Position	Seats	+/–	Status in legislature	Ref.
1997	468,443	75.33	▲1st	21 / 26	New	Supermajority government	
2005	178,259	10.54	▼5th	3 / 26	▼18	Opposition	
2011	70,260	5.87	▲4th	6 / 26	▲3	Opposition	
2014	27,602	6.01	4th	5 / 26	▼1	Opposition	
2020	(Note: Vice-President Jewel Howard-Taylor has the voting power of a senator)		▼14th	1 / 26	▼4	Government	
