= Liberty Party (Liberia) =

Political party in Liberia

- Abbreviation: LP
- Leader: Nyonblee Karnga-Lawrence
- Founder: Charles Brumskine
- Founded: 19 May 2005
- Headquarters: Monrovia, Liberia
- Ideology: Liberalism; Economic liberalism Federalism; Parliamentarianism
- Political position: Center to center-right
- National affiliation: Collaborating Political Parties (2018–2024)
- Colours: Green; White
- Senate: 3 / 30
- House of Representatives: 6 / 73

Website
- Facebook page

The Liberty Party (LP) is a liberal political party in Liberia.

== History ==
The party was founded on 19 May 2005. It first fielded candidates in the 2005 elections. Its candidate Charles Brumskine placed third in the presidential poll, winning 13.9% of the vote. The party won 2/15 of the half up for election seats in the Senate and nine in the House of Representatives.

In October 2010, the party was set for a coalition with the Congress for Democratic Change (CDC), the largest party in the Legislature. The deal would have seen the two field a single list of candidates and presidential candidate in the next year's elections; a shared leadership of Brumskine and the CDC's standard-bearer, George Weah. This deal fell apart, and party accordingly announced in February 2011 its senator Franklin Siakor had been chosen as Brumskine's running mate for the election.

The 2014 senate elections saw the party take second (or third if including the independents), with 11.47% of the vote, however the third-largest tranche of party political seats – all being geographic – happened to favour the then lesser-polling Unity Party. The LP share of the up for election half of senate seats was 2/15. The party has 4 of the 30 senators, the most recently elected being Abraham Darius Dillon in 2019.

In the 2017 two-purpose elections, the party eked out third (or fourth if including the independents), with 9.62% of the presidential vote; 8.57% in the House. In the latter its sum of three seats was surpassed by the lesser-polling PUP, and by the greater-polling independents with 13 of the 73 seats.

It was formerly led by Charlyne Brumskine. Since 2024, its political leader is Nyonblee Karnga-Lawrence.
