= Alternative National Congress =

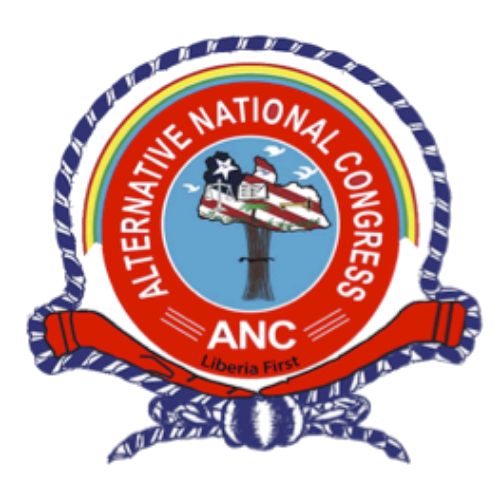
- Abbreviation: ANC
- Leader: Alexander B. Cummings Jr.
- Ideology: Social Liberalism; Anti-Corruption
- Political position: Center
- National affiliation: Collaborating Political Parties
- Colors: Red and White
- Slogan: Liberians deserve better
- Senate seats: 1 / 30
- House seats: 0 / 73

Website
- ancglobalgroup.com

The Alternative National Congress (ANC) is a social liberal political party in Liberia.

== History ==
The ANC was established on 17 August 2013 after registering with the National Electoral Commission. It was founded by former members of the Congress for Democratic Change including Lafayette Horatio Gould and Henry Pedro Costa, who broke away from the party. The party won a single seat in the 2014 Senate elections, with Daniel Naatehn winning in Gbarpolu County.

In the 2017 general elections the party nominated Alexander B. Cummings Jr. as its presidential candidate; he finished fifth with 7% of the vote. Despite having the fourth-highest vote share in the House of Representatives elections, the party failed to win a seat. It did not nominate any candidates in the 2020 Senate elections.

The party's chairman and only senator Daniel Naatehn died on 8 August 2023 while receiving treatment overseas.

Cummings was nominated as the party's presidential candidate for the 2023 general elections, which it contested as part of the Collaborating Political Parties (CPP) alongside the Liberty Party. Charlyne Brumskine was his running mate.
