= Coalition for Democratic Change =

- Abbreviation: CDC
- Leader: George Weah
- Founders: George Weah; Jewel Taylor
- Founded: 29 December 2016
- Ideology: Big tent
- Colours: Blue
- Senate: 9 / 30
- House of Representatives: 25 / 73

The Coalition for Democratic Change (CDC) is a political alliance in Liberia.

== History ==
The alliance was certified by the National Elections Commission on 29 December 2016 to contest the 2017 general elections. The coalition initially consisted of the Congress for Democratic Change, National Patriotic Party and the Liberia People's Democratic Party. It nominated George Weah, leader of the Congress for Democratic Change, as its presidential candidate. Weah was elected President in the second round of voting with 61.5% of the vote, while the CDC won 21 of the 73 seats in the House of Representatives.

For the 2023 general election the coalition expanded to also include, beyond the original members, the Union of Liberian Democrats, the United People's Party, the Change Democratic Action and the Movement for Economic Empowerment.
