= Congress for Democratic Change =

Political party in Liberia

- Abbreviation: CDC
- Chairperson: Janga Augustus Kowo
- Founder: George Weah
- Ideology: Populism; Civic nationalism Reformism
- Political position: Big tent
- National affiliation: Coalition for Democratic Change
- Colours: Blue
- Seats in the Senate: 9 / 30
- Seats in the House: 25 / 73

Website
- cdcliberia.org

Congress for Democratic Change (abbreviated CDC) is a Liberian political party formed by supporters of George Weah's during the 2005 presidential campaign.

== History ==
During the 11 October 2005 elections, Weah placed first in the presidential poll, winning 28.3% of the vote. He was defeated by Ellen Johnson Sirleaf of the Unity Party in the 8 November run-off election, winning 40.6% of the vote compared to Johnson-Sirleaf's 59.4%. In the 2017 presidential election, the party was the largest component of the Coalition for Democratic Change, and won the presidency under Weah.

The party won three seats in the Senate and 15 in the House of Representatives.

== Electoral history ==
=== Presidential elections ===
Election	Candidate	Votes	%	Votes	%	Result
Election	Candidate	First round		Second round		Result
2005	George Weah	275,265	28.27%	327,046	40.60%	Lost ✗
2011	Winston Tubman	394,370	32.68%	62,207	9.29%	Lost ✗
2017	George Weah (Note: Ran as candidate of the Coalition for Democratic Change)	596,037	38.37%	732,185	61.54%	Won ✓
2023	George Weah	804,087	43.83%	793,914	49.36%	Lost ✗

=== House of Representatives elections ===
Election	Vote	%	Seats	+/–	Position
2005	157,753	15.97%	15 / 64	New	▲1st
2011	163,592	12.84%	11 / 73	▼4	▼2nd
2017	239,754 (as part of CDC)	15.57%	21 / 73	▲15	▲1st
2023	401,921 (as part of CDC)	22.12%	25 / 73	▲4	1st

=== Senate elections ===
Election	Votes	%	Seats	+/–	Position
2005	252,677	15.97%	3 / 30	New	▲3rd
2011	259,161	20.20%	3 / 30	Steady	3rd
2014	135,897	29.78%	4 / 30	▲1	3rd
2020	246,908	28.02%	6 / 30	▲2	▲2nd
2023	620,892 (as part of CDC)	34.26%	9 / 30	▲3	▲1st
