= Communities of the Greater Monrovia District =

The Greater Monrovia District, i.e. the district covering the Liberian capital Monrovia is divided into 160+ communities, below listed by municipal administration and electoral district;

Community	Pop. (2014 est.)	Households (2014 est)	Municipal administration	Electoral district
Bong Mines Bridge	5,573	1,359	New Kru Town	Montserrado-16
Central New Kru Town	5,880	1,434	New Kru Town	Montserrado-16
Crab Hole	7,532	1,837	New Kru Town	Montserrado-16
Duala Market	6,405	1,562	New Kru Town	Montserrado-16
Duala Mombo Town-East	8,752	2,135	New Kru Town	Montserrado-16
Fundaye	4,259	1,039	New Kru Town	Montserrado-16
Lagoon East	5,405	1,318	New Kru Town	Montserrado-16
Lagoon West	5,575	1,360	New Kru Town	Montserrado-16
Monboe Town West	3,475	848	New Kru Town	Montserrado-16
Nyuan Town	6,692	1,632	New Kru Town	Montserrado-16
Point Four	7,317	1,785	New Kru Town	Montserrado-16
Popo Beach A	5,938	1,448	New Kru Town	Montserrado-16
Popo Beach B	2,913	710	New Kru Town	Montserrado-16
Tweh Farm	8,683	2,118	New Kru Town	Montserrado-16
Blamo Town	7,105	1,733	Garwolon	Montserrado-15
Central Logan Town	6,749	1,646	Garwolon	Montserrado-15
Free Port Development	194	47	Garwolon	Montserrado-15
Gbandi Town	5,277	1,287	Garwolon	Montserrado-15
Jamaica Road	8,306	2,026	Garwolon	Montserrado-13
King Peter Town	4,924	1,201	Garwolon	Montserrado-15
Little White Chapel	7,741	1,888	Garwolon	Montserrado-15
Stockton Creek	2,253	549	Garwolon	Montserrado-13
Vicky Spot	3,404	830	Garwolon	Montserrado-15
Zinc Camp	9,219	2,248	Garwolon	Montserrado-15
Zondo Town	8,077	1,970	Garwolon	Montserrado-15
Central Clara Town I	5,968	1,456	Garwolon	Montserrado-14
Central Clara Town II	7,356	1,794	Garwolon	Montserrado-14
Cow Factory	9,799	2,390	Garwolon	Montserrado-14
Free Port Community	5,810	1,417	Garwolon	Montserrado-14
Giblata	2,164	528	Garwolon	Montserrado-14
Hope Community	6,441	1,571	Garwolon	Montserrado-14
Paity Town	5,488	1,338	Garwolon	Montserrado-14
Peugeot Garage	4,013	979	Garwolon	Montserrado-14
River View	4,832	1,179	Garwolon	Montserrado-14
Struggle Community	7,652	1,866	Garwolon	Montserrado-14
Vai Town A	1,468	358	Garwolon	Montserrado-14
Vai Town B	2,367	577	Garwolon	Montserrado-14
Central West Point	7,959	1,941	West Point	Montserrado-7
Fish Town	6,094	1,486	West Point	Montserrado-7
Grandcess Yard	7,341	1,790	West Point	Montserrado-7
Police Station	4,911	1,198	West Point	Montserrado-7
Power Plant	4,651	1,134	West Point	Montserrado-7
West Point	3,649	890	West Point	Montserrado-7
Centennial Area	4,974	1,213	Monrovia City Corporation	Montserrado-7
Lynch / Center Streets	6,778	1,653	Monrovia City Corporation	Montserrado-7
Mamba Point	10,524	2,567	Monrovia City Corporation	Montserrado-7
Randall / Newport Streets	5,361	1,307	Monrovia City Corporation	Montserrado-7
Randall / Lynch Streets	7,326	1,787	Monrovia City Corporation	Montserrado-7
Rock Crusher	9,779	2,385	Monrovia City Corporation	Montserrado-7
Snapper Hill	2,432	593	Monrovia City Corporation	Montserrado-7
Sports Commission	3,220	785	Monrovia City Corporation	Montserrado-7
BTC Area	138	34	Monrovia City Corporation	Montserrado-7
Bassa Community	2,219	541	Monrovia City Corporation	Montserrado-8
Bernard Quarters	3,997	975	Monrovia City Corporation	Montserrado-8
Bishop Brooks	4,889	1,193	Monrovia City Corporation	Montserrado-8
Buzzi Quarters	5,081	1,239	Monrovia City Corporation	Montserrado-8
Capitol Hill	547	133	Monrovia City Corporation	Montserrado-8
Crown Hill	3,253	793	Monrovia City Corporation	Montserrado-8
Jallah Town	3,761	917	Monrovia City Corporation	Montserrado-8
Maternity Community	3,495	853	Monrovia City Corporation	Montserrado-8
Rock Spring Valley	4,272	1,042	Monrovia City Corporation	Montserrado-8
Slipway	5,418	1,321	Monrovia City Corporation	Montserrado-8
Soniwein	7,179	1,751	Monrovia City Corporation	Montserrado-8
Warwein	1,683	410	Monrovia City Corporation	Montserrado-8
Cooper Clinic	11,135	2,716	Monrovia City Corporation	Montserrado-8/ Montserrado-9
Fiama	7,263	1,772	Monrovia City Corporation	Montserrado-9
Fish Market	2,694	657	Monrovia City Corporation	Montserrado-9
ICA Camp	4,723	1,152	Monrovia City Corporation	Montserrado-9
Ocean View	4,061	990	Monrovia City Corporation	Montserrado-8/ Montserrado-9
Plumkor	5,418	1,321	Monrovia City Corporation	Montserrado-8
Pyne People	6,726	1,640	Monrovia City Corporation	Montserrado-9
Saye Town	5,169	1,261	Monrovia City Corporation	Montserrado-8
Central Lakpazee	6,353	1,550	Monrovia City Corporation	Montserrado-9
Fiama East	7,644	1,864	Monrovia City Corporation	Montserrado-9
Gbangaye Town	4,435	1,082	Monrovia City Corporation	Montserrado-9
New Matadi	9,357	2,282	Monrovia City Corporation	Montserrado-9
Old Matadi	6,632	1,618	Monrovia City Corporation	Montserrado-9
Raymond Field	4,569	1,114	Monrovia City Corporation	Montserrado-9
Wroto Town	6,753	1,647	Monrovia City Corporation	Montserrado-9
Catholic Hospital	5,761	1,405	Congo Town	Montserrado-10
Chugbor	7,765	1,894	Congo Town	Montserrado-10
Divine-Togba Camp	7,255	1,770	Congo Town	Montserrado-10
Gaye Town Community	10,242	2,498	Congo Town	Montserrado-10
Key & Death Hole	7,407	1,807	Congo Town	Montserrado-10
Nippay Town	3,682	898	Congo Town	Montserrado-10
Smythe Road	3,940	961	Congo Town	Montserrado-10
Tarr Town	5,681	1,386	Congo Town	Montserrado-10
Yekpee Town	3,280	800	Congo Town	Montserrado-10
Barchue Town	3,555	867	Congo Town	Montserrado-10
Congo Town	3,121	761	Congo Town	Montserrado-10
Congo Town Old Rd	7,649	1,866	Congo Town	Montserrado-10
Oldest Congo Town	2,199	536	Congo Town	Montserrado-10
Pagos Island	2,202	537	Congo Town	Montserrado-5
Peace Island	4,658	1,136	Congo Town	Montserrado-10
Swankamore	5,036	1,228	Congo Town	Montserrado-5
72nd Community	16,162	3,942	Paynesville City Corporation	Montserrado-5
A.B Tolbert Road	7,539	1,839	Paynesville City Corporation	Montserrado-5
Barnard Farm	7,459	1,819	Paynesville City Corporation	Montserrado-4
Bassa Town	10,985	2,679	Paynesville City Corporation	Montserrado-5
City View	7,798	1,902	Johnsonville	Montserrado-2
Double Bridge	5,135	1,252	Paynesville City Corporation	Montserrado-2
Duport Road N. East	11,709	2,856	Paynesville City Corporation	Montserrado-4
Duport Road North	9,114	2,223	Paynesville City Corporation	Montserrado-4
Duport Road South	14,113	3,442	Paynesville City Corporation	Montserrado-4
GSA Road Rockville	13,117	3,199	Paynesville City Corporation	Montserrado-6
Jacob Town	10,853	2,647	Paynesville City Corporation	Montserrado-2
Kemah Town/Omega	26,110	6,368	Paynesville City Corporation	Montserrado-4
Kende-jah	7,730	1,885	Paynesville City Corporation	Montserrado-6
King Gray-ELWA	5,969	1,456	Paynesville City Corporation	Montserrado-6
Kpelle Town	14,808	3,612	Paynesville City Corporation	Montserrado-6
Morris Farm	14,271	3,481	Paynesville City Corporation	Montserrado-3
Neezoe	13,273	3,237	Paynesville City Corporation	Montserrado-3
Paynesville Joe Bar	8,594	2,096	Paynesville City Corporation	Montserrado-4
Pipeline A	8,864	2,162	Paynesville City Corporation	Montserrado-3
Pipeline B	11,338	2,765	Paynesville City Corporation	Montserrado-3
Police Academy	15,890	3,876	Paynesville City Corporation	Montserrado-5
Red Light	16,478	4,019	Paynesville City Corporation	Montserrado-5
Rehab/Borbor Town	19,425	4,738	Paynesville City Corporation	Montserrado-6
Rock Hill	10,142	2,474	Johnsonville	Montserrado-2
S.D. Cooper	6,032	1,471	Paynesville City Corporation	Montserrado-6
Soul Clinic	14,826	3,616	Paynesville City Corporation	Montserrado-4
Town Hall	5,953	1,452	Paynesville City Corporation	Montserrado-5
Wood Camp	16,923	4,128	Paynesville City Corporation	Montserrado-3
Zinc Factory	11,444	2,791	Paynesville City Corporation	Montserrado-2
Barnersville Road	4,737	1,155	Gardnersville	Montserrado-11
Chicken Soup Factory	25,198	6,146	Gardnersville	Montserrado-12
Day Break Mouth Open	4,960	1,210	Gardnersville	Montserrado-11
Grass Field	8,517	2,077	Gardnersville	Montserrado-11
J.E Marshall	8,555	2,087	Gardnersville	Montserrado-11
JJY / Snow Hill	8,535	2,082	Gardnersville	Montserrado-12
Kesselly Booulevard	5,351	1,305	Gardnersville	Montserrado-12
River View	5,530	1,349	Gardnersville	Montserrado-12
MTA	4,635	1,130	Gardnersville	Montserrado-12
Mangrove Island	4,361	1,064	Gardnersville	Montserrado-12
Shoe Factory	6,726	1,640	Gardnersville	Montserrado-12
Stephen Tolbert Estate	4,476	1,092	Gardnersville	Montserrado-12
Bassa Town	2,524	616	New Georgia	Montserrado-13
Battery Factory	4,869	1,188	New Georgia	Montserrado-13
Chocolate City A	5,961	1,454	New Georgia	Montserrado-13
Chocolate City B	6,025	1,470	New Georgia	Montserrado-13
Flahn Town	5,417	1,321	New Georgia	Montserrado-13
Iron Factory	3,966	967	New Georgia	Montserrado-13
New Georgia	5,700	1,390	New Georgia	Montserrado-13
New Georgia Estate	9,753	2,379	New Georgia	Montserrado-13
Old Field Gulf Sign Board	9,739	2,375	New Georgia	Montserrado-13
SOS Transit	5,877	1,433	New Georgia	Montserrado-13
Topoe Village	6,345	1,548	New Georgia	Montserrado-13
Barnersville Estate	4,227	1,031	Barnersville	Montserrado-11
Behwein Community	6,256	1,526	Barnersville	Montserrado-11
Dabwe Town	3,061	747	Barnersville	Montserrado-11
Duan Town	5,445	1,328	Barnersville	Montserrado-11
Johnsonville Road A	6,425	1,567	Barnersville	Montserrado-12
Johnsonville Road B	5,002	1,220	Barnersville	Montserrado-11
Kaba Town	6,740	1,644	Barnersville	Montserrado-11
Old Field South	3,267	797	Barnersville	Montserrado-11
Caldwell Community	4,456	1,087	Caldwell	Montserrado-15
Caldwell Market	3,817	931	Caldwell	Montserrado-11
Cassava Hill	437	106	Caldwell	Montserrado-11
Central Caldwell	3,308	807	Caldwell	Montserrado-15
Dixville A	3,599	878	Dixville	Montserrado-11
Dixville B	1,318	321	Dixville	Montserrado-11
Dixville Water Side	1,092	266	Caldwell	Montserrado-11
New Georgia Road	7,474	1,823	Caldwell	Montserrado-15
Samukai Town	1,844	450	Caldwell	Montserrado-11
Upper Caldwell	3,807	929	Caldwell	Montserrado-11
