= List of senators from Montserrado County =

Montserrado County highlighted in red.

Montserrado County elects two senators to the Senate of Liberia. It is currently represented by Saah H. Joseph and Abraham Darius Dillon.

== List of senators ==
Senator Elected	Year (Note: Indicates the year or years the senator was elected.)	Party (Note: Indicates party the senator was registered with during their election.)	Notes
Joyce Musu Freeman	2005	CDC	Ran as an independent for re-election in 2014.
Hannah G. Brent	2005	CDC	Died in office in 2009.
Geraldine M. Doe-Sheriff	2009	CDC	
Geraldine M. Doe-Sheriff	2011	CDC	Died in office in 2019.
George Weah	2014	CDC	Elected president in 2017.
Saah H. Joseph	2018	CDC	
Saah H. Joseph	2023	CDC	
Abraham Darius Dillon	2019	LP	Also backed by the UP, ANC, and ALP.
Abraham Darius Dillon	2020	CPP	

== See also ==
- Montserrado County House of Representatives districts
  - Montserrado-1
  - Montserrado-2
  - Montserrado-3
  - Montserrado-4
  - Montserrado-5
  - Montserrado-6
  - Montserrado-7
  - Montserrado-8
  - Montserrado-9
  - Montserrado-10
  - Montserrado-11
  - Montserrado-12
  - Montserrado-13
  - Montserrado-14
  - Montserrado-15
  - Montserrado-16
  - Montserrado-17
