= Chocolate City, Liberia =

Chocolate City
- Suburb
- Location in Liberia
- Coordinates: 6°19′57″N 10°45′26″W
- Country: Liberia
- County: Montserrado County
- District: Greater Monrovia

Population (2014)
  - Total: 11,986
- Time zone: UTC+0 (GMT)

Chocolate City is a central-northern suburb of Monrovia, the administrative capital and largest city in Liberia. It is located in the New Georgia Township. The suburb can be found on the outskirts of Monrovia, approximately 4.7 kilometres (2.9 mi) away from the city itself. The area has a total population of just under 12,000.

== Name ==
There are a number of theories as to how Chocolate City got its name. One is that Chocolate City got its name from a chocolate factory that was due to be built in the area that never was completed. Another local tale is that the area regularly smelled of faeces, and rather than name the source of the smell, the locals started calling it Chocolate City to make light of it.

== History ==
During the Second Liberian Civil War between the years of 1999–2003, the area was war-torn, and "rape, murder and plunder" happened every night in Chocolate City at the hands of soldiers, with the civilian population suffering greatly. Hundreds of thousands of refugees hid in churches, schools and houses and many thousands died.

The area was badly affected by the ebola epidemic in 2014.

== Population ==
Chocolate City contains two communities, Chocolate City A and Chocolate City B. As of 2014 the population of Chocolate City A was estimated at 5,961 and the population of Chocolate City B at 6,025. Chocolate City A and Chocolate City B are part of the Montserrado-13 electoral district. The area is known to contain slum settlements.

Chocolate City contains the Elizabeth Blunt School and Francis Freeman Elementary School.
