= Kaba Town =

- Community
- Location in Liberia
- Coordinates: 6°21′53″N 10°43′14″W
- Country: Liberia
- County: Montserrado County
- District: Greater Monrovia
- Township: Gardnersville
- Time zone: UTC+0 (GMT)

Kaba Town is a community in Gardnersville, Greater Monrovia District, Liberia. Kaba Town is part of the Montserrado-11 electoral district.
