= Montserrado-12 =

Electoral district in Liberia

- Constituency for the House of Representatives of Liberia
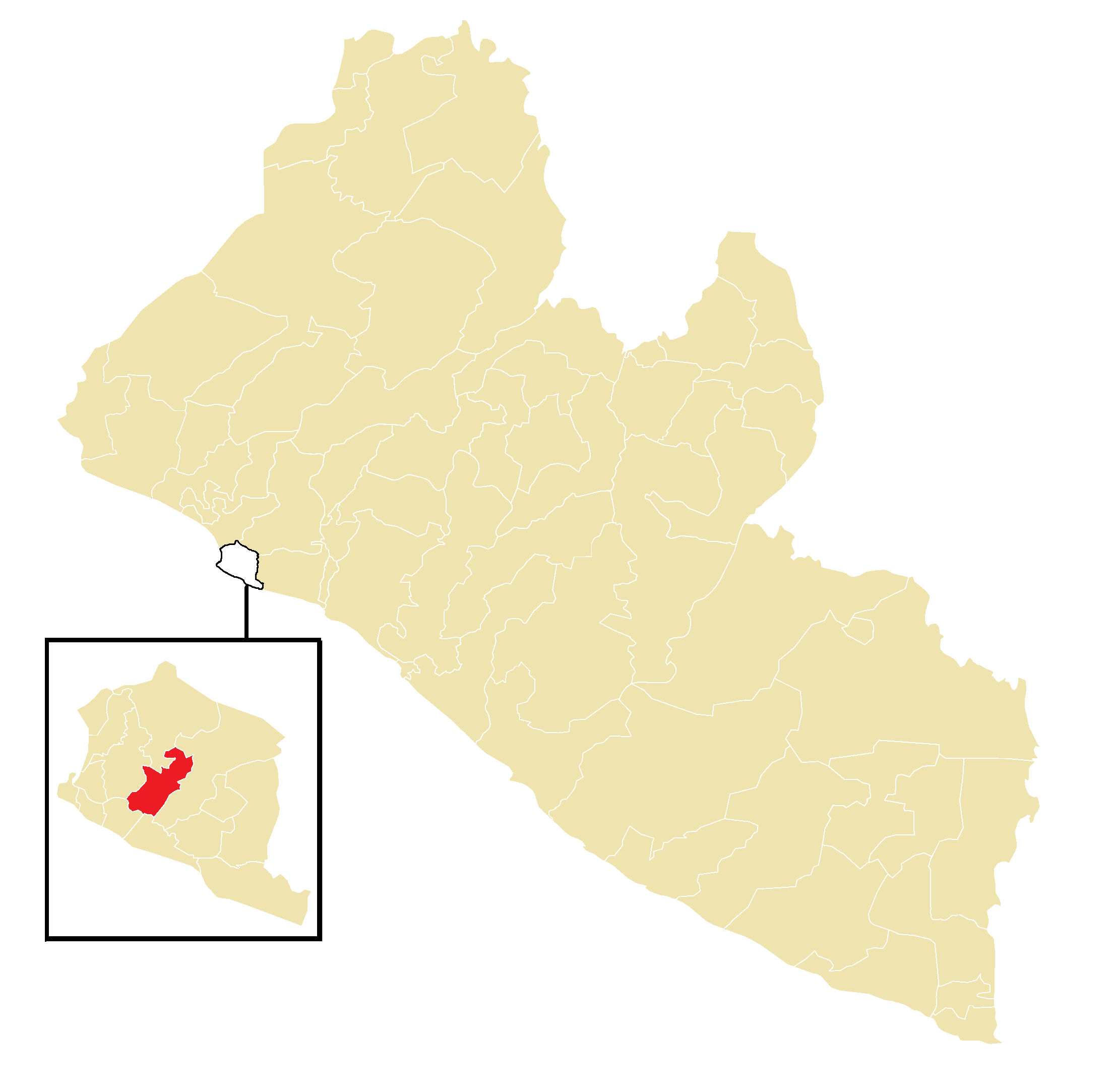
- Electorate: 54,396 (2023)

Current constituency
- Created: 2011
- Representative: Jerry K. Yogboh

Montserrado-12 is an electoral district for the elections to the House of Representatives of Liberia. The district covers 8 communities of the Gardnersville township; Chicken Soup Factory, Shoe Factory, Stephen Tolbert Estate, River View, MTA, Kesselly Boulevard, Mangrove Island and J.J.Y.-Snow Hill and well as the Johnsonville Road A community of the Barnersville township.

== Elected representatives ==
| Year | Representative elected | Party | Notes |
|---|---|---|---|
| 2005 | Edward S. Forh | CDC | |
| 2011 | Richmond S. Anderson | LP | |
| 2017 | George Beyan Samah | Ind. | |
| 2023 | Jerry K. Yogboh | Ind. | |

== Election results ==
2005 Montserrado County's 12th House District Election
| Candidate | Party | Votes | % |
|---|---|---|---|
| Edward S. Forh | Congress for Democratic Change | 10,021 | 41.93 |
| Ebenezer C. Barclay Sr. | Alliance for Peace and Democracy | 3,236 | 13.54 |
| David K. Swen | Independent | 2,862 | 11.97 |
| Benjamin S. Taylor | Unity Party | 2,475 | 10.35 |
| S. W. Peters | Coalition for the Transformation of Liberia | 2,275 | 9.52 |
| J. L. Crusoe | Liberty Party | 1,451 | 6.07 |
| James T. Tumu | All Liberia Coalition Party | 818 | 3.42 |
| Al B. Karlay | Independent | 764 | 3.20 |
| Total | | 23,902 | 100.00 |
| Valid votes | | 23,902 | 95.34 |
| Invalid/blank votes | | 1,167 | 4.66 |
| Total votes | | 25,069 | 100.00 |

2011 Montserrado County's 12th House District Election
| Candidate | Party | Votes | % |
|---|---|---|---|
| Richmond S. Anderson | Liberty Party | 4,057 | 16.99 |
| Augustus Mawolo Zayzay Jr. | Independent | 3,755 | 15.72 |
| Dave Koomey Sr. | Congress for Democratic Change | 3,699 | 15.49 |
| Samuel D. Freeman Worzie | Unity Party | 2,694 | 11.28 |
| Emmanuel Hallie Fallah | Liberia Transformation Party | 2,343 | 9.81 |
| Urias Worjloh Brooks | Independent | 1,978 | 8.28 |
| Nouho S. M. Kenneth | National Union for Democratic Progress | 1,478 | 6.19 |
| B. Edward Wawoe Sr. | National Democratic Coalition | 1,447 | 6.06 |
| Tenial Watta Duo | Original Congress Party of Liberia | 952 | 3.99 |
| Patrick N. Nyenkan | Union of Liberian Democrats | 507 | 2.12 |
| Paye S. Gbelayan | Independent | 403 | 1.69 |
| Nathaniel Nyema Giko | National Democratic Party of Liberia | 308 | 1.29 |
| Alfred Kaibah Worzi | Liberia Reconstruction Party | 264 | 1.11 |
| Total | | 23,885 | 100.00 |
| Valid votes | | 23,885 | 94.69 |
| Invalid/blank votes | | 1,340 | 5.31 |
| Total votes | | 25,225 | 100.00 |

2017 Montserrado County's 12th House District Election
| Candidate | Party | Votes | % |
|---|---|---|---|
| George Beyan Samah | Independent | 7,401 | 22.42 |
| Richmond S. Anderson | Liberty Party | 4,324 | 13.10 |
| Dave Koomey Sr. | Coalition for Democratic Change | 3,775 | 11.43 |
| Augustus M. Zayzay Jr. | Grassroot Democratic Party of Liberia | 2,689 | 8.14 |
| Amara M. Fofana | Unity Party | 1,976 | 5.98 |
| Prince Dimeh Kreplah | Independent | 1,839 | 5.57 |
| Paye Saydee Gbelayan | People's Unification Party | 1,768 | 5.35 |
| Bilclintosh Sedek Kamara | Movement for Economic Empowerment | 1,382 | 4.19 |
| Tenial Watta Duo | Democratic Justice Party | 1,381 | 4.18 |
| Joseph T. P. Cummings | Alternative National Congress | 947 | 2.87 |
| Isaiah Moboe Sarkor | Liberia Restoration Party | 929 | 2.81 |
| Siafa S. Kamara | Vision for Liberia Transformation | 748 | 2.27 |
| Noratus Howard Afabor | Liberia Transformation Party | 666 | 2.02 |
| Michael M. Williams Sr. | Coalition for Liberia's Progress | 651 | 1.97 |
| Emmanuel K. Robertson | Liberian People's Party | 425 | 1.29 |
| Archievego M. Doe | United People's Party | 417 | 1.26 |
| Teah D. Nimley | Movement for Democracy and Reconstruction | 378 | 1.14 |
| John H. Mathies | Independent | 314 | 0.95 |
| Baindu C. N. Taylor | Movement for Progressive Change | 255 | 0.77 |
| Kedrick N. Dunbar | Change Democratic Action | 228 | 0.69 |
| Laraamand S. Nyonton | All Liberian Party | 207 | 0.63 |
| Abraham Siaka Sherif | Liberia National Union | 164 | 0.50 |
| Peter C. Dorkpoh Jr. | True Whig Party | 154 | 0.47 |
| Total | | 33,018 | 100.00 |
| Valid votes | | 33,018 | 95.53 |
| Invalid/blank votes | | 1,546 | 4.47 |
| Total votes | | 34,564 | 100.00 |
