= Key & Death Hole =

- Community
- Country: Liberia
- County: Montserrado County
- District: Greater Monrovia
- Township: Congo Town

Population (2014)
  - Total: 7,407

Key & Death Hole is a community in the township of Congo Town, Greater Monrovia District, Liberia. The community is located on the eastern, i.e. Old Road, side of the Spriggs Payne Airport. The name Death Hole stems from massacres of the Liberian Civil War, occurring near the airfield in 1990. An alternative name for the area is Tweh-Johnsonville, after Matthew Tweh and Rt. Gen. J. Samuel Johnson.

As of 2014 the population of Key & Death Hole was estimated at 7,407. Key & Death Hole is part of the Montserrado-10 electoral district.
