= Montserrado-2 =

Electoral district in Liberia

- Constituency for the House of Representatives of Liberia
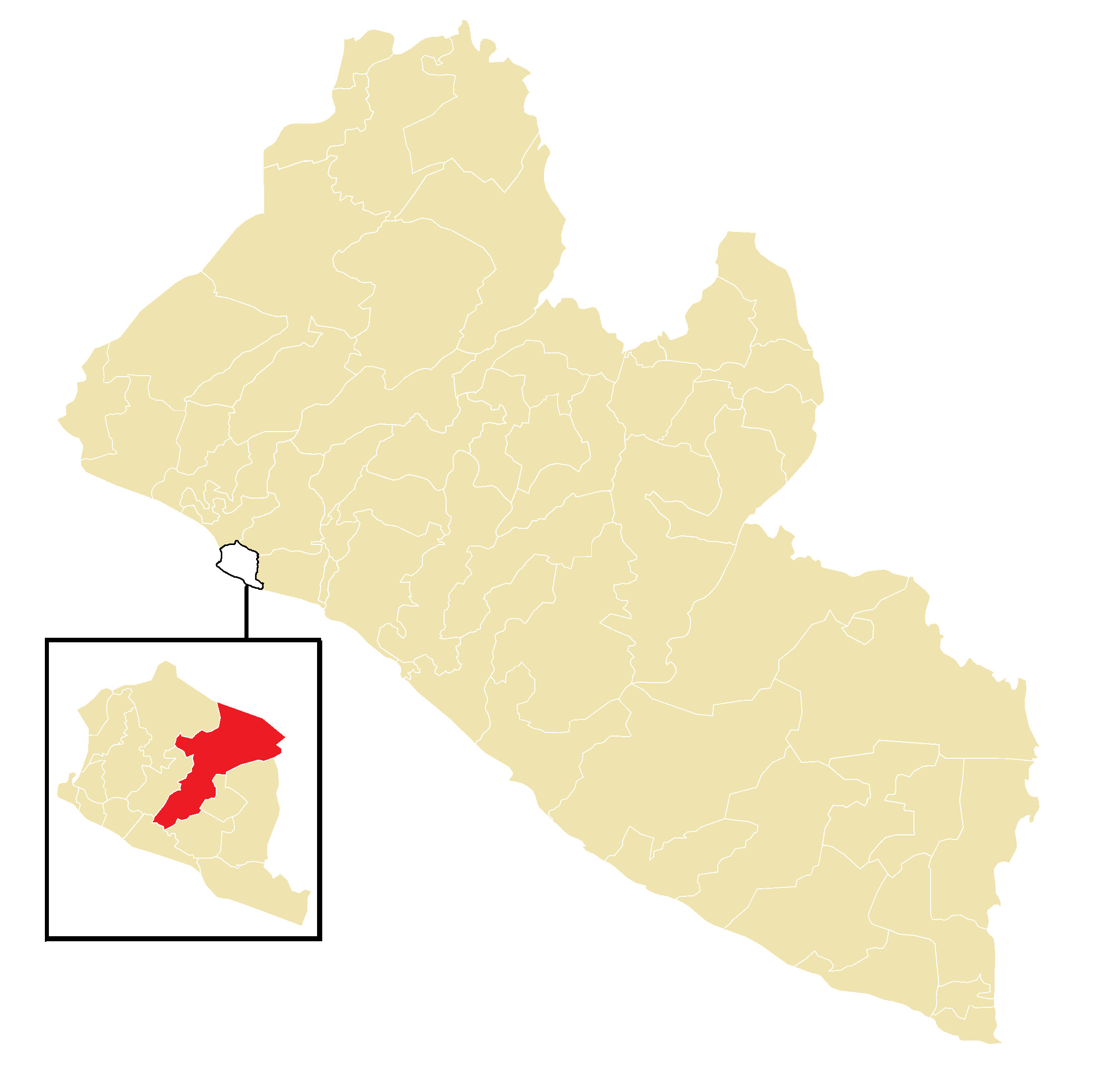
- Electorate: 61,495 (2023)

Current constituency
- Created: 2011
- Representative: Sekou Sarafoday Kanneh

Montserrado-2 is an electoral district for the elections to the House of Representatives of Liberia. The district covers Johnsonville Township and the Double Bridge, Jacob Town and Zinc Factory communities of Paynesville.

== Elected representatives ==
Year	Representative elected	Party	Notes
2005	Rufus Dio Neufville	CDC	
2011	Sekou S. Kanneh	UP	
2017	Jimmy W. Smith	CDC	
2023	Sekou Sarafoday Kanneh	UP	

== Election results ==
2005 Montserrado County's 2nd House District Election
Candidate	Party	Votes	%
Rufus Dio Neufville	Congress for Democratic Change	11,765	47.14
David Ernest Kortie	Unity Party	4,309	17.27
Elizabeth Alexandra Bannerman	National Patriotic Party	2,371	9.50
Johnny Saley Foyah Sr.	Liberty Party	1,895	7.59
Lawrence Wah Jackson	Coalition for the Transformation of Liberia	1,755	7.03
Macokoni James	All Liberia Coalition Party	945	3.79
Cleopatra Manu Davies	Free Democratic Party	688	2.76
Ephraim Baysamah Seville	Independent	682	2.73
Alphonso P. Tiady	New Deal Movement	548	2.20
Total		24,958	100.00
Valid votes		24,958	94.99
Invalid/blank votes		1,316	5.01
Total votes		26,274	100.00

2011 Montserrado County's 2nd House District Election
Candidate	Party	Votes	%
Sekou S. Kanneh	Unity Party	7,145	29.75
Jimmy W. Smith	Congress for Democratic Change	6,600	27.48
James Mulbah Flomo-Kellen	Independent	3,011	12.54
Mulbah P. Gayflor	Independent	1,714	7.14
Shedrick A. Bettie Sr.	Independent	1,669	6.95
Jenkins Rickson Jorgbor	Liberty Party	1,155	4.81
Augustine Sumoiwuo Arkoi	Independent	1,124	4.68
Ivy Kpasie Harris	Movement for Progressive Change	665	2.77
J. Deami Stewart	Liberia Transformation Party	299	1.25
Daniel Saye Mehnbiah Sr.	National Union for Democratic Progress	289	1.20
Mohammed Fofi Fofana	All Liberia Coalition Party	229	0.95
Timothy Barcrah Gaye	Original Congress Party of Liberia	115	0.48
Total		24,015	100.00
Valid votes		24,015	94.06
Invalid/blank votes		1,516	5.94
Total votes		25,531	100.00

2017 Montserrado County's 2nd House District Election
Candidate	Party	Votes	%
Jimmy W. Smith	Coalition for Democratic Change	11,502	33.62
Sekou S. Kanneh (Incumbent)	Unity Party	9,570	27.98
Nimely Jarbokly Donyen	Liberia Transformation Party	3,417	9.99
James M. Flomo-Kellen	All Liberian Party	2,336	6.83
Kulanyah Eric Yeasu	Independent	2,305	6.74
Mohammed Sekou Saysay	Liberty Party	1,769	5.17
Tom Destiny Rogers	United People's Party	722	2.11
Robert T. Payzine Jr.	Liberian People's Party	481	1.41
Nelsco A. Wolo	Movement for Democracy and Reconstruction	469	1.37
Anthony V. S. Mallay II	Movement for Economic Empowerment	393	1.15
Shelia Bryant Kenneh	Change Democratic Action	388	1.13
Gertie Kelvin Sulunteh	Alternative National Congress	286	0.84
Dehkortee Deah Sheirff	People's Unification Party	223	0.65
Wede O. Glay	Movement for Progressive Change	192	0.56
Yanka M. Sampson	Liberia Restoration Party	154	0.45
Total		34,207	100.00
Valid votes		34,207	93.72
Invalid/blank votes		2,294	6.28
Total votes		36,501	100.00
