= Chicken Soup Factory =

- Community
- Country: Liberia
- County: Montserrado County
- District: Greater Monrovia
- Township: Gardnesville

Population (2014)
  - Total: 25,198

Chicken Soup Factory is a community in Gardnesville Township, Greater Monrovia District, Liberia. The name hails from a defunct Maggi chicken bouillon cube factory located in the area.

== History ==
Despite the name, the chicken soup factory it was named after no longer operates. As of 2014 the population of Chicken Soup Factory was estimated at 25,198. Chicken Soup Factory is part of the Montserrado-12 electoral district. During the 2014 Ebola virus epidemic in Liberia, Chicken Soup Factory was quarantined by Liberian officials with no outside access permitted.

In 2015, the Chicken Soup Factory community was involved in a dispute with the government of Liberia in 2015. The Liberian authorities had designated the Industrial Park area for demolition and reconstruction without compensating residents. Due to the number of people living there, the Liberian authorities considered forcibly removed the inhabitants from the area in order to carry out the demolition. The region's senator Armah Jallah protested this and cited that though they were technically squatting on the land illegally, the 40,000 population and longevity of their presence should be taken into account and requested the park be moved.

In 2018, a new steelworks was constructed in Chicken Soup Factory. By 2025, there were concerns over safety at the steelworks due to a number of injuries and deaths of workers there. In 2022, the Chicken Soup Factory residents requested a redeveloped football stadium. The Montserrado County district #12 representative candidate Prince Krepla financed the new 400 seater, $6 million stadium with his own fundraising.
