= Bushrod Island =

Island in Liberia

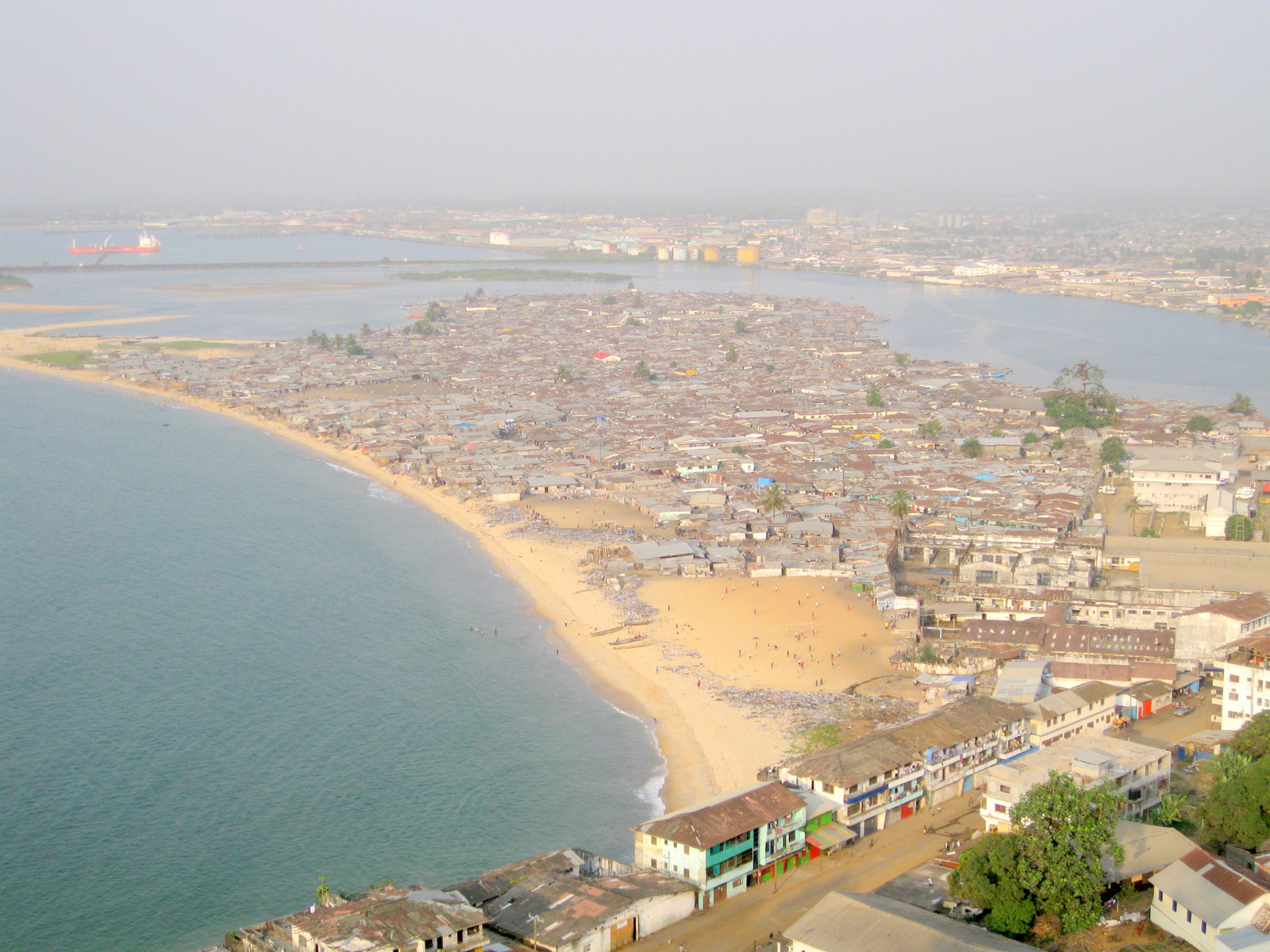
- Interactive map of Bushrod Island

Geography
- Location: Atlantic Ocean
- Coordinates: 6°21′27″N 10°47′8″W
- Area: 13.64 km^{2} (5.27 sq mi)

Administration
- Liberia
- County: Montserrado

Demographics
- Population: 234,596 (1996)
- Pop. density: 17,200/km^{2} (44500/sq mi)

Bushrod Island is an island near Monrovia, Liberia surrounded by the Atlantic Ocean, the Saint Paul River, the Mesurado River and Stockton Creek (a tidal channel that connects the two rivers). It contains the Freeport of Monrovia, the major national port of Liberia and a variety of businesses. It also contains numerous residential areas and government buildings. There are four towns on the island, Vai Town, New Kru Town, Logan Town and Clara Town.

Its proximity to the capital and industrial base make it an important commercial area for the country. End Point is a geographical feature on north end of Bushrod Island.

== History ==
Mostly a low-lying mangrove swamp, Bushrod Island was occupied by the Dei people from the 16th century until the early 19th century. Gawulun was the chief town of the Dei on the island, and served as the capital of the Dei when "King Peter" was selected as the chief spokesman for his fellow Dei chiefs in 1819.

In the late 1820s the community of New Georgia was established on Bushrod Island by people who had been freed from a slave ship in 1820, and kept in Georgia in the United States until 1827. New Georgia is now located on the mainland directly to the east of Bushrod Island.

The island is named after Bushrod Washington, a nephew of George Washington and first president of the American Colonization Society (ACS). The ACS, which was active during the first part of the 19th century, advocated the emigration to Africa of free and enslaved African Americans.

In 1878 a community of Vai people (called "Vai Town" by Williams) was located on Bushrod Island across the Mesurado River from Monrovia, while a few miles up the river on the island the community of New Georgia had about 500 residents.

During the Second Liberian Civil War in 2003, the island was an important frontline in the battle for Monrovia between government and LURD forces. Due to the fighting, the American Joint Task Force Liberia deployed to stabilize the area on August 14, 2003.
