= Montserrado-5 =

Electoral district in Liberia

- Constituency for the House of Representatives of Liberia
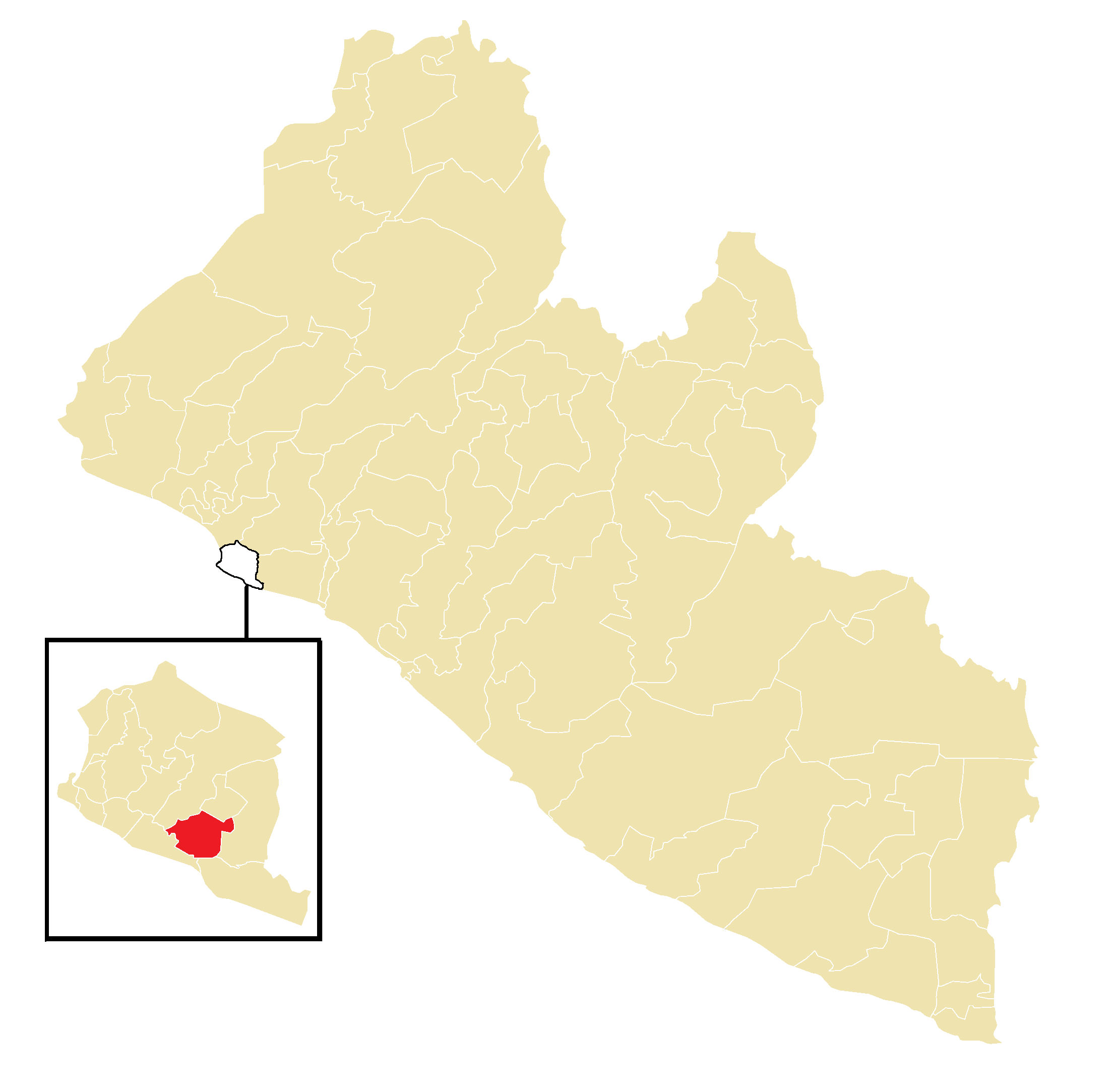
- Electorate: 45,395 (2023)

Current constituency
- Created: 2011
- Representative: Prescilla A. Cooper

Montserrado-5 is an electoral district for the elections to the House of Representatives of Liberia. The district covers the Paynesville communities of 72nd Community, Police Academy, Bassa Town, Red Light, A.B. Tolbert Road and Town Hall, as well as the Congo Town communities of Swankamore and Pagos Island.

== Elected representatives ==
Year	Representative elected	Party	Notes
2005	Edwin Snowe	IND	
2011	Thomas P. Fallah	CDC	
2017	Thomas P. Fallah	CDC	
2023	Prescilla A. Cooper	UP	

== Election results ==
2005 Montserrado County's 5th House District Election
Candidate	Party	Votes	%
Edwin Snowe	Independent	14,210	59.28
Augustus A. Lawrence	Liberty Party	2,885	12.04
Mary Z. Sherif	Unity Party	2,580	10.76
Benjamin L. Byepu Jr.	Congress for Democratic Change	2,241	9.35
Marie E. McIntosh	National Patriotic Party	992	4.14
Lewis J. Clinton	Freedom Alliance Party of Liberia	478	1.99
Rebecca B. Free	National Reformation Party	400	1.67
Steven G. Weah Sr.	Alliance for Peace and Democracy	184	0.77
Total		23,970	100.00
Valid votes		23,970	95.64
Invalid/blank votes		1,094	4.36
Total votes		25,064	100.00

2011 Montserrado County's 5th House District Election
Candidate	Party	Votes	%
Thomas P. Fallah	Congress for Democratic Change	7,824	29.74
Alexander Allieu Suah Sr.	Unity Party	4,879	18.55
Clarence Kezele Momolu Sr.	Independent	2,575	9.79
Julius Kollie Sele	Independent	2,381	9.05
Michael Z. Holder Jr.	Independent	2,241	8.52
Tewah Lusu Blama Dunor	Liberia Reconstruction Party	1,242	4.72
Tugbeh Chieh Tugbeh	Original Congress Party of Liberia	1,190	4.52
Bob D. Taylor	National Patriotic Party	1,108	4.21
Anthony Saah Tengbeh	Liberty Party	905	3.44
Borbor Baba Kromah	National Reformation Party	723	2.75
Paye Earlvin Glay	Liberia Transformation Party	572	2.17
Johnson A. Mentee Gweh Sr.	Union of Liberian Democrats	349	1.33
Emmanuel Lloyd	Movement for Progressive Change	315	1.20
Total		26,304	100.00
Valid votes		26,304	93.07
Invalid/blank votes		1,959	6.93
Total votes		28,263	100.00

2017 Montserrado County's 5th House District Election
Candidate	Party	Votes	%
Thomas P. Fallah (Incumbent)	Coalition for Democratic Change	12,384	37.69
Alexander A. Suah Sr.	Coalition for Liberia's Progress	4,641	14.12
Kwesi Sarmu Johnson Sr.	Liberty Party	4,130	12.57
Norris L. Tweah	Unity Party	1,968	5.99
Michael Zoiboi Holder Jr.	Movement for Democracy and Reconstruction	1,728	5.26
Benjamin Yele Wehye	Movement for Economic Empowerment	1,595	4.85
Charlyne Andrena Taylor	Independent	1,353	4.12
Shiafa L. A. Dennis	Alternative National Congress	1,267	3.86
Borbor Baba Kromah	United People's Party	660	2.01
C. Hendrix Grupee	Vision for Liberia Transformation	591	1.80
Williametta Marpoo Woods	Independent	587	1.79
Retta A. Vincent	True Whig Party	469	1.43
Anthony Saah Tengbeh	Movement for Progressive Change	432	1.31
Christopher Swaray	Liberia Transformation Party	401	1.22
Grace Y. Yuan	All Liberian Party	362	1.10
Safiyatu A. R. Massaquoi	Grassroot Democratic Party of Liberia	290	0.88
Total		32,858	100.00
Valid votes		32,858	95.19
Invalid/blank votes		1,660	4.81
Total votes		34,518	100.00
