= Montserrado-11 =

Electoral district in Liberia

- Constituency for the House of Representatives of Liberia
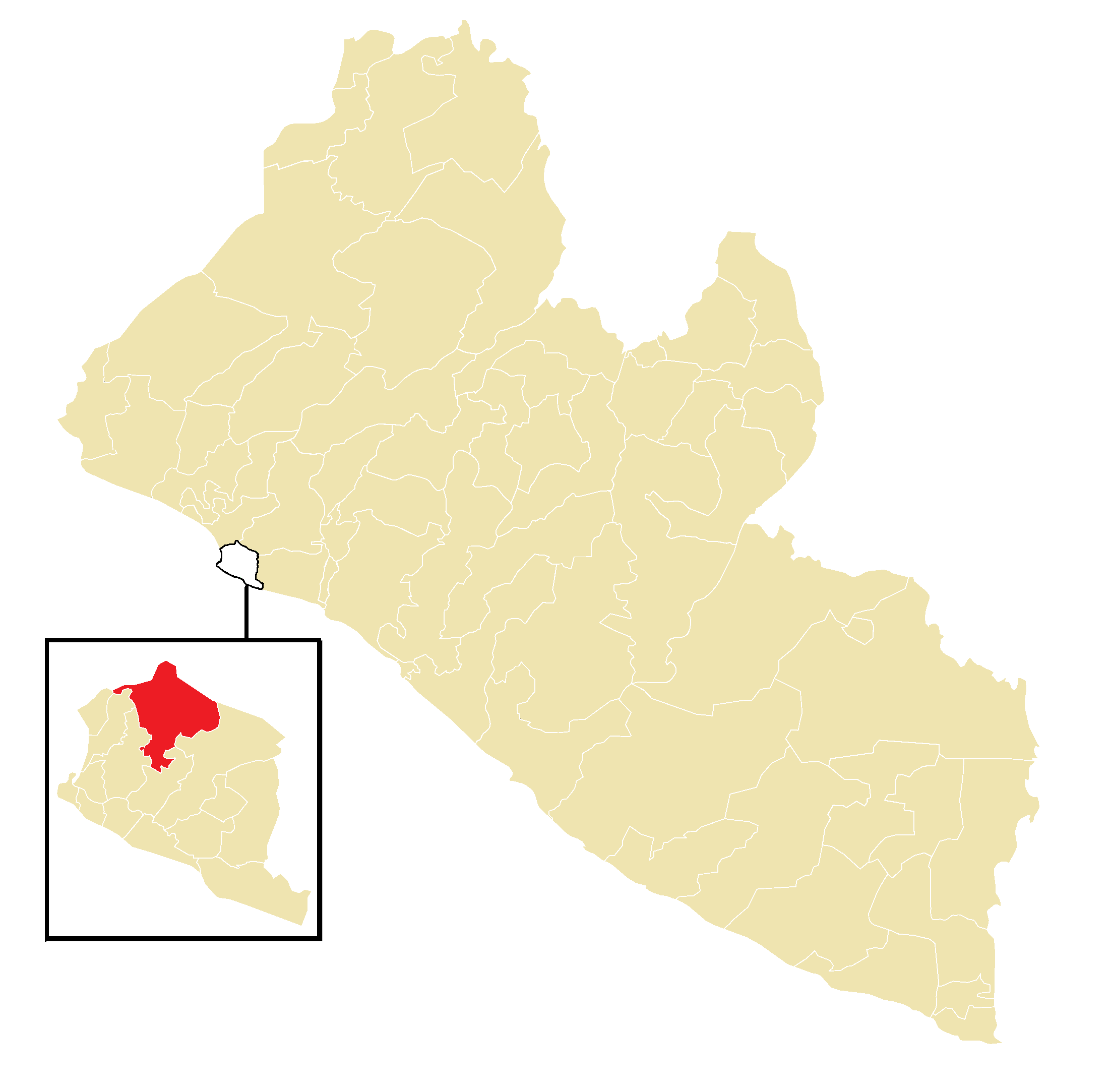
- Electorate: 59,901 (2023)

Current constituency
- Created: 2011
- Representative: Richard Koon

Montserrado-11 is an electoral district for the elections to the House of Representatives of Liberia. The district covers the eastern parts of Caldwell township (Caldwell Market, Upper Caldwell, Dixville Water Side, Samukai Town and Cassava Hill), all of Dixville township, parts of Barnersville township (all communities except Johnsonville Road A) and four communities of the Gardnersville township (Grass Field, Barnersville Road, Day Break Mouth Open and J.E. Marshall).

== Elected representatives ==
Year	Representative elected	Party	Notes
2005	Elmond Tatius Barclay	CDC	
2011	Moses Saah Tandanpolie	CDC	Died in office.
2012	J. Gabriel Nyenka	UP	
2017	Richard Koon	UP	
2023	Richard Koon	UP	

== Election results ==
2005 Montserrado County's 11th House District Election
Candidate	Party	Votes	%
Elmond T. Barclay	Congress for Democratic Change	7,795	31.96
Jenkins D. Pelenah	Coalition for the Transformation of Liberia	4,041	16.57
Amex B. Johnson	Unity Party	4,024	16.50
Philip D. Samuels	United Democratic Alliance	3,066	12.57
Ma-Zoe B. Kiawu	Liberty Party	1,417	5.81
Musa S. Daramay	All Liberia Coalition Party	1,060	4.35
Larine E. Mathies	Freedom Alliance Party of Liberia	830	3.40
Bokotoe N. Sackor	Progressive Democratic Party	830	3.40
Clarence N. Wilson	National Patriotic Party	741	3.04
Stephen Kaifa Jr.	National Reformation Party	584	2.39
Total		24,388	100.00
Valid votes		24,388	95.25
Invalid/blank votes		1,217	4.75
Total votes		25,605	100.00

2011 Montserrado County's 11th House District Election
Candidate	Party	Votes	%
Moses Saah Tandanpolie Sr.	Congress for Democratic Change	8,123	34.63
J. Gabriel Nyenka	Unity Party	4,806	20.49
Richard Koon	Independent	2,443	10.42
Alice T. Togbe	Original Congress Party of Liberia	1,461	6.23
Jargba Kokoidee Jargba	Citizens Unification Party	1,017	4.34
Stephen Garbee Forkpa	Freedom Alliance Party of Liberia	975	4.16
J. Jenkins Kla-Yancy II	Independent	841	3.59
Tugbe Saydee Worjloh	Liberty Party	752	3.21
Julius T. Suku	Liberia Transformation Party	705	3.01
Korto Jallah Socree	National Democratic Party of Liberia	698	2.98
J. Owen-Dweh Woart	Independent	627	2.67
Robert Wreah Jarwleh	National Democratic Coalition	493	2.10
Jehu B. Yates	National Social Democratic Party of Liberia	263	1.12
Franklin Boimah Massaquoi	Liberia Empowerment Party	250	1.07
Total		23,454	100.00
Valid votes		23,454	94.43
Invalid/blank votes		1,384	5.57
Total votes		24,838	100.00

2017 Montserrado County's 11th House District Election
Candidate	Party	Votes	%
Richard Koon	Unity Party	6,674	20.54
J. Gabriel Seedee Nyenka	Coalition for Democratic Change	5,416	16.67
Lafayette B. Gould Sr.	Alternative National Congress	4,008	12.33
Siah J. Tandanpolie	Liberia Transformation Party	2,541	7.82
Tonia A. Gibson	Independent	1,964	6.04
Joseph Edward Williamson	Change Democratic Action	1,863	5.73
Thompson N. Jargba	Independent	1,408	4.33
Philomina Nmah Freeman	Liberia National Union	1,184	3.64
B. Edward Wawoe Sr.	Liberty Party	951	2.93
Jackson N. Morlu	Independent	733	2.26
Nyenekon Beauty Barcon	Vision for Liberia Transformation	608	1.87
Moses P. Roberts Sr.	Coalition for Liberia's Progress	608	1.87
Emmanuel M. Nyantee	True Whig Party	584	1.80
Tarwuo L. Poure	All Liberian Party	546	1.68
James Nyan Domah	Liberians for Prosperity	523	1.61
Thomas W. O. King	Movement for Economic Empowerment	483	1.49
Milton J. Jargbah	People's Unification Party	476	1.46
Samuel D. Wureh Jr.	Independent	450	1.38
Krangar Royal David	Movement for Progressive Change	390	1.20
R. Jackie Moore	Movement for Democracy and Reconstruction	382	1.18
Richie Garley Grear	United People's Party	378	1.16
Franklin B. Massaquoi	Liberia Restoration Party	178	0.55
Mougnuemuetorh Sackor	Liberian People's Party	151	0.46
Total		32,499	100.00
Valid votes		32,499	95.16
Invalid/blank votes		1,653	4.84
Total votes		34,152	100.00
