= Montserrado-3 =

Electoral district in Liberia

- Constituency for the House of Representatives of Liberia
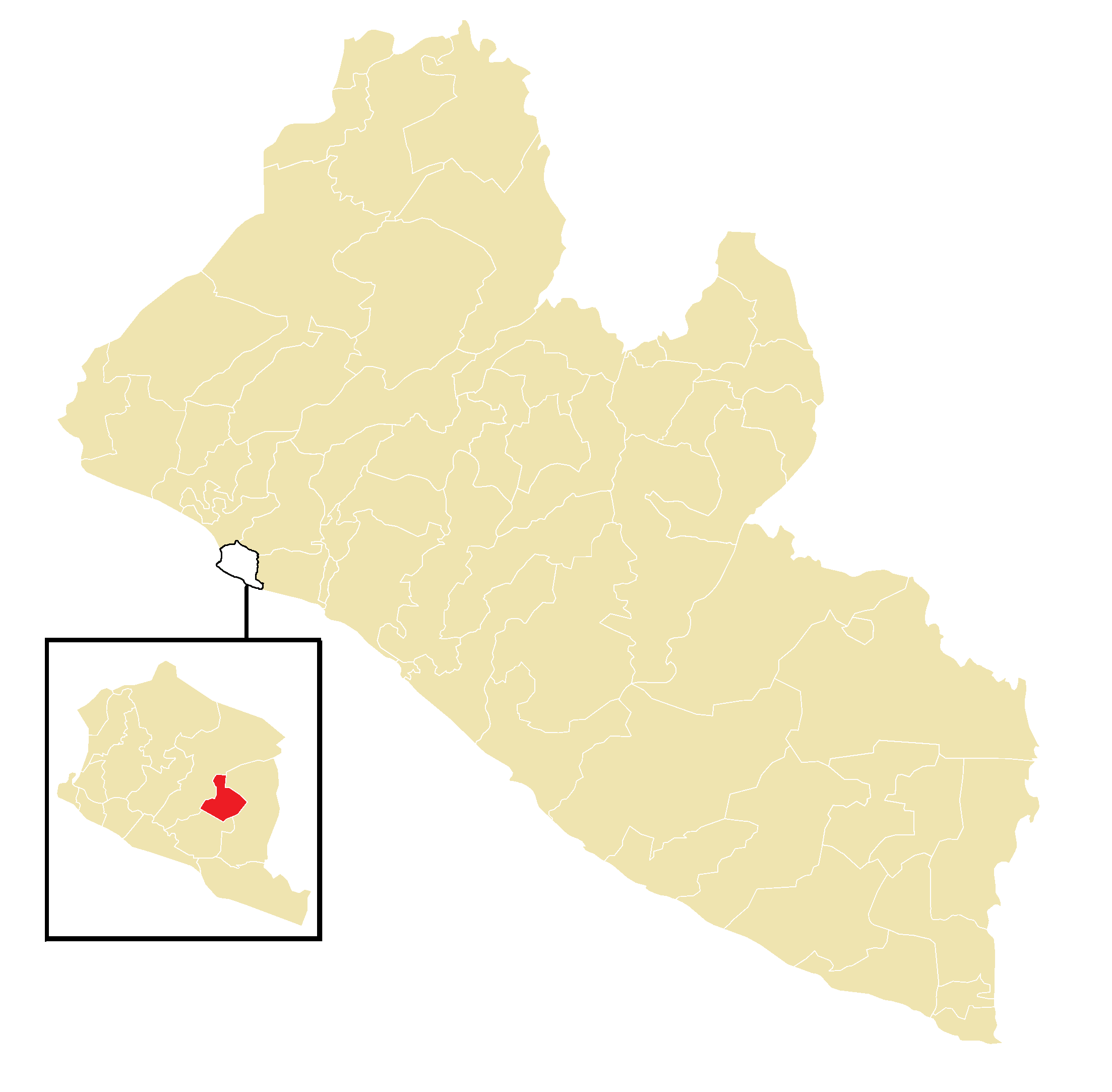
- Electorate: 51,064 (2023)

Current constituency
- Created: 2011
- Representative: Sumo Kollie Mulbah

Montserrado-3 is an electoral district for the elections to the House of Representatives of Liberia. The constituency covers the Morris Farm, Wood Camp, Pipe Line A, Pipe Line B and Neezoe communities of Paynesville.

== Elected representatives ==
Year	Representative elected	Party	Notes
2005	Kettehkumuehn Earl Murray	CDC	
2011	Bill Twehway	UP	
2017	Ceebee C. D. Barshell	UP	
2023	Sumo Kollie Mulbah	ALP	

== Election results ==
2005 Montserrado County's 3rd House District Election
Candidate	Party	Votes	%
Kettehkumuehn E. Murray	Congress for Democratic Change	5,398	19.07
Tarnue Jarboi	Unity Party	4,490	15.86
Fatu Kamara	Liberty Party	3,738	13.21
Michael I. Diggs	Independent	3,314	11.71
B. M. Catakaw	Coalition for the Transformation of Liberia	2,286	8.08
Jallah M. Kingsley	National Patriotic Party	2,272	8.03
Una K. Thompson	United Democratic Alliance	2,219	7.84
Richmond S. Anderson	National Party of Liberia	1,532	5.41
Michael K. Kesselly	Independent	1,392	4.92
Mohammed V. Kamara	Union of Liberian Democrats	737	2.60
Kainde D. Johns	New Deal Movement	522	1.84
Sam Y. Cooper	Alliance for Peace and Democracy	405	1.43
Total		28,305	100.00
Valid votes		28,305	95.90
Invalid/blank votes		1,209	4.10
Total votes		29,514	100.00

2011 Montserrado County's 3rd House District Election
Candidate	Party	Votes	%
Bill Twehway	Unity Party	5,607	22.54
David Sumowuoi Flomo	Congress for Democratic Change	5,501	22.11
Kuku Younger Dorbor	Liberty Party	4,172	16.77
Solo Gbardyu	Independent	3,931	15.80
Konah Voker Sr.	National Reformation Party	989	3.98
Stephen Z. Holder	Freedom Alliance Party of Liberia	870	3.50
Michael Kosleh Kwamie	National Union for Democratic Progress	782	3.14
Abraham B. Gerard	Independent	575	2.31
Memuna Kromah Dennis	Liberia Transformation Party	561	2.25
Laurine Hedd Williams Nhaway	Progressive Democratic Party	433	1.74
Isaac Liverpool George Jr.	Victory for Change Party	414	1.66
David J. K. Sana	Grassroot Democratic Party of Liberia	378	1.52
Toney Bracewell Jr.	Liberia Empowerment Party	244	0.98
Augustine B. Wheaton	National Democratic Coalition	219	0.88
Abraham F. Yarmai Sr.	Liberia Restoration Party	203	0.82
Total		24,879	100.00
Valid votes		24,879	94.54
Invalid/blank votes		1,438	5.46
Total votes		26,317	100.00

2017 Montserrado County's 3rd House District Election
Candidate	Party	Votes	%
Ceebee C. D. Barshell	Unity Party	7,960	25.18
Bill Twehway (Incumbent)	Coalition for Democratic Change	7,308	23.12
Patrick Komoyan	Alternative National Congress	4,113	13.01
Kanio Bai Gbala	Liberty Party	2,166	6.85
H. Lawrence M. Darkollie	Movement for Economic Empowerment	2,157	6.82
Kuku Younger Dorbor	Liberia Transformation Party	1,312	4.15
Josiah Flomo Joekai Jr.	Independent	1,199	3.79
Kollie Massayan Sorsor Sr.	Liberia National Union	1,194	3.78
Sumo Kollie Mulbah	All Liberian Party	948	3.00
Stephen Zoiboi Holder	United People's Party	670	2.12
David S. Flomo	Victory for Change Party	632	2.00
Amos Mulbah Lavalah	Movement for Progressive Change	600	1.90
James Jaye Larblah	Change Democratic Action	457	1.45
Cecelia S. Q. Vanwen	Grassroot Democratic Party of Liberia	376	1.19
Michael Kosleh Kwamie	Movement for Democracy and Reconstruction	217	0.69
Garmai Wenwu Evans	Coalition for Liberia's Progress	205	0.65
Esther B. McGill	Liberia Restoration Party	98	0.31
Total		31,612	100.00
Valid votes		31,612	94.76
Invalid/blank votes		1,749	5.24
Total votes		33,361	100.00
