= Dixville, Liberia =

Dixville
- Township
- Country: Liberia
- County: Montserrado
- District: Greater Monrovia

Government
  - Commissioner: Comfort W. Taylor

Population (2014)
  - Total: 4,917

Dixville is a township in Greater Monrovia District, Montserrado County, Liberia. The Dixville township was one of five townships founded in the second wave of colonization, between 1828 and 1847 (when Liberia was declared an independent state).

== Government ==
In 2018 President George Weah appointed Comfort W. Taylor as Commissioner for Dixville.

Dixville is part of the Montserrado-11 electoral district.

== Demographics ==
Dixville township is divided into two communities;

Community	Inhabitants (2014 est.)	No. of Households (2014 est.)
Dixville A	3,599	878
Dixville B	1,318	321
Total:	4,917	1,199
