= Montserrado-7 =

Electoral district for the elections to the House of Representatives of Liberia

- Constituency for the House of Representatives of Liberia
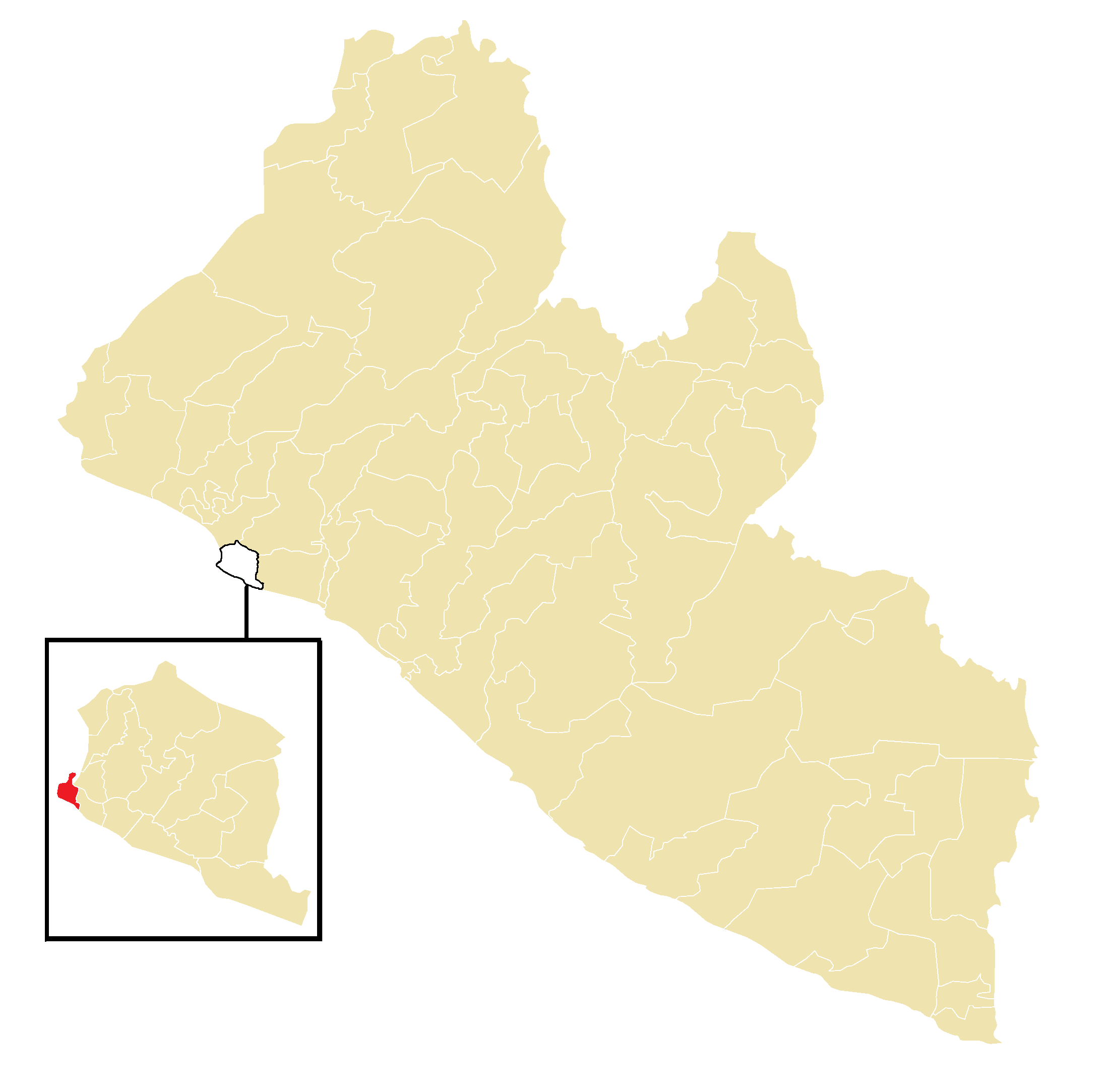
- Electorate: 44,311 (2023)

Current constituency
- Created: 2011
- Representative: Emmanuel Dahn

Montserrado-7 is an electoral district for the elections to the House of Representatives of Liberia. The district covers the township of West Point and downtown Monrovia (i.e the Centennial Area, Lynch/Center Streets, Mamba Point, Randall/Newport Streets, Randall/Lynch Streets, Rock Crusher, Snapper Hill, Sports Commission and BTC Area communities).

== Elected representatives ==
Year	Representative elected	Party	Notes
2005	Thomas P. Fallah	CDC	
2011	Solomon C. George	CDC	
2017	Solomon C. George	CDC	
2023	Emmanuel Dahn	IND	

== Election results ==
2005 Montserrado County's 7th House District Election
Candidate	Party	Votes	%
Thomas P. Fallah	Congress for Democratic Change	4,741	19.95
Joseph G. Mulbah	National Reformation Party	4,281	18.01
Mohammed S. Sheriff	Unity Party	3,873	16.30
Solomon C. Gbardyou	Liberty Party	2,830	11.91
Abu F. Donzo	All Liberia Coalition Party	1,869	7.86
Allison Barco	National Patriotic Party	1,828	7.69
Sekou M. Saysay	Progressive Democratic Party	1,731	7.28
Isaac L. Flomo	Coalition for the Transformation of Liberia	1,510	6.35
John B. Dennis	National Democratic Party of Liberia	603	2.54
D. M. Morris	Freedom Alliance Party of Liberia	501	2.11
Total		23,767	100.00
Valid votes		23,767	93.08
Invalid/blank votes		1,766	6.92
Total votes		25,533	100.00

2011 Montserrado County's 7th House District Election
Candidate	Party	Votes	%
Solomon C. George	Congress for Democratic Change	7,004	25.90
Frank Musah Dean Jr.	Unity Party	3,976	14.70
A. Ernest Tweh	Independent	3,202	11.84
Aliou Varney Bah	Independent	3,093	11.44
Andrew Nyumah Ngolloe	Liberia Transformation Party	2,817	10.42
Abraham Sensee Sirleaf	Independent	1,465	5.42
Gabriel Cuwor Starks	Independent	1,219	4.51
Ciapha Saah Gbollie	National Democratic Coalition	1,101	4.07
Pierre Dezoe Harris	Independent	925	3.42
Rodney Patrick Anderson	Independent	776	2.87
Elizabeth Alexandra Bannerman	Independent	644	2.38
Charles Meindy Jangaba	Independent	572	2.12
Evelyn Zeor Bailey Clarke	National Democratic Party of Liberia	250	0.92
Total		27,044	100.00
Valid votes		27,044	93.85
Invalid/blank votes		1,771	6.15
Total votes		28,815	100.00

2017 Montserrado County's 7th House District Election
Candidate	Party	Votes	%
Solomon C. George (Incumbent)	Coalition for Democratic Change	8,317	27.10
Sabah Jomah	Independent	4,696	15.30
Kebeh Forkpa Collins	Independent	3,397	11.07
Emmanuel Dahn	Unity Party	2,953	9.62
Abdallah M. Housseini	All Liberian Party	2,561	8.34
Aliou Varney Bah	Liberian People's Party	1,794	5.85
Pokah Kwiah Roberts	Independent	1,169	3.81
Alfred P. K. Cassell	Liberty Party	991	3.23
Andrew N. Ngolloe	Victory for Change Party	948	3.09
Ella Musu Coleman	Movement for Progressive Change	820	2.67
Boima Kay Folley	Movement for Economic Empowerment	801	2.61
Alomiza Mamie Ennos	Alternative National Congress	744	2.42
Ciapha Saah Gbollie	Grassroot Democratic Party of Liberia	516	1.68
Sam B. G. McCrumanda	Liberia Transformation Party	432	1.41
David Z. F. Jallah	Liberia Restoration Party	181	0.59
Emmanuel Nah Davies	United People's Party	135	0.44
James D. Cooper	Vision for Liberia Transformation	121	0.39
Amos Gbeyanyon Yloe	Liberia National Union	114	0.37
Total		30,690	100.00
Valid votes		30,690	96.42
Invalid/blank votes		1,139	3.58
Total votes		31,829	100.00
