= Montserrado-4 =

Electoral district in Liberia

- Constituency for the House of Representatives of Liberia
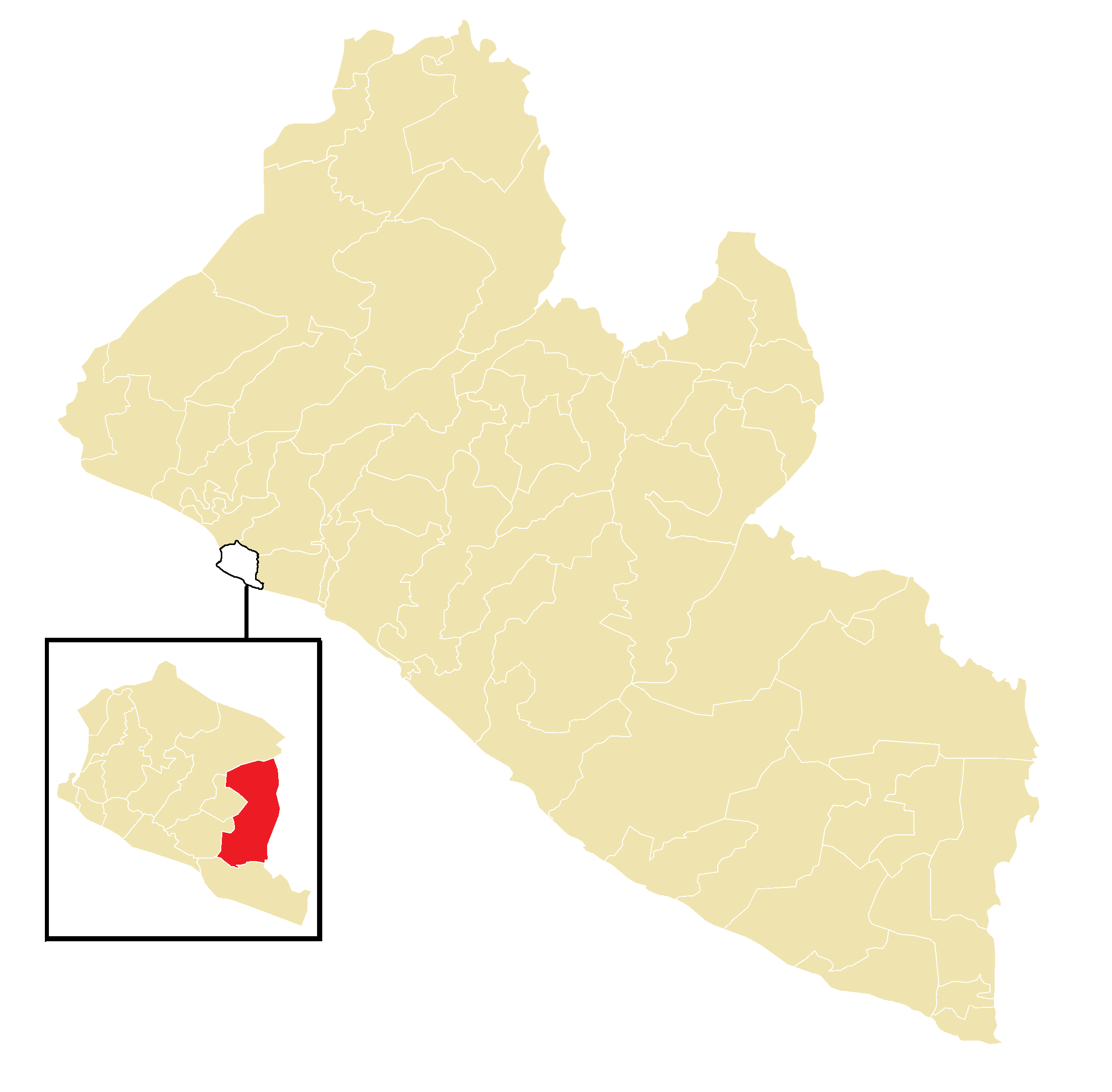
- Electorate: 75,517 (2023)

Current constituency
- Created: 2011
- Representative: Michael M. Thomas

Montserrado-4 is an electoral district for the elections to the House of Representatives of Liberia. The district covers the Paynesville communities of Kemah Town/Omega, Soul Clinc, Duport Road North, Duport Road North East, Duport Road South and Paynesville Joe Bar.

== Elected representatives ==
Year	Representative elected	Party	Notes
2005	Dusty Lawrence Wolokolie	UP	
2011	Henry B. Fahnbulleh	UP	
2017	Rustonlyn S. Dennis	LTP	
2023	Michael M. Thomas	IND	

== Election results ==
2005 Montserrado County's 4th House District Election
Candidate	Party	Votes	%
Dusty L. Wolokolie	Unity Party	7,424	27.01
George B. Kailondo Sr.	Congress for Democratic Change	6,970	25.36
Alexander V. Saylee	Liberty Party	4,492	16.34
Barclay B. Dennis Jr.	Coalition for the Transformation of Liberia	2,175	7.91
Beegar I. Coker	National Patriotic Party	1,605	5.84
Omar V. Al-Sherif	United Democratic Alliance	1,506	5.48
Richelieu L. Johnson	Freedom Alliance Party of Liberia	922	3.35
Eric J. Goodridge Sr.	National Democratic Party of Liberia	888	3.23
Jenekai D. Lansanah	National Reformation Party	815	2.97
Kaifa M. Holmes	Reformed United Liberia Party	688	2.50
Total		27,485	100.00
Valid votes		27,485	95.67
Invalid/blank votes		1,243	4.33
Total votes		28,728	100.00

2011 Montserrado County's 4th House District Election
Candidate	Party	Votes	%
Henry B. Fahnbulleh	Unity Party	5,939	22.31
Garbee F. Pewee	Congress for Democratic Change	4,738	17.80
Momo B. Kamara	Movement for Progressive Change	3,346	12.57
Amos Beyane	Independent	2,029	7.62
Zoe K. Gougou Willie	Liberia Transformation Party	1,694	6.36
Emily Mollie Gaye	Liberia Empowerment Party	1,201	4.51
Toe Edward Dahn	Original Congress Party of Liberia	1,147	4.31
Nuwoe A. D. Scott	Alliance for Peace and Democracy	1,040	3.91
Michael Aquay	Liberty Party	945	3.55
Charles Vad Brooks	National Union for Democratic Progress	930	3.49
Richard Welemongar Suah	Liberia Destiny Party	914	3.43
T. Odicious Sackie	Freedom Alliance Party of Liberia	840	3.16
Jerry Kerkulah Kollie	National Democratic Coalition	655	2.46
Paul Duo Tuazama Jr.	Citizens Unification Party	436	1.64
Mark Korvah Kollie	Union of Liberian Democrats	277	1.04
Cooper Gbatah	All Liberia Coalition Party	274	1.03
Richelieu Lama Taylor	Liberia Reconstruction Party	210	0.79
Total		26,615	100.00
Valid votes		26,615	93.58
Invalid/blank votes		1,825	6.42
Total votes		28,440	100.00

2017 Montserrado County's 4th House District Election
Candidate	Party	Votes	%
Rustonlyn S. Dennis	Liberia Transformation Party	6,494	14.68
Momo B. Kamara	Independent	5,403	12.21
John A. A. Gabriel	Independent	3,652	8.26
S. Yelekay Tingban	Vision for Liberia Transformation	3,185	7.20
Henry B. Fahnbulleh (Incumbent)	Unity Party	3,175	7.18
John Sumo Flomo Jr.	Movement for Economic Empowerment	2,969	6.71
Nuwoe A. D. Scott	Coalition for Democratic Change	2,604	5.89
Garbee F. Pewee	Alternative National Congress	2,327	5.26
Terance Troken Doe	Movement for Progressive Change	2,037	4.60
Soko Karmo Sackor	Liberty Party	1,796	4.06
Jimmy Saah Bombo	Movement for Democracy and Reconstruction	1,568	3.54
Alex Geroge Korkolea	Redemption Democratic Congress	1,498	3.39
Emmanuel D. Howe	Independent	1,166	2.64
Sekou M. Kromah	Independent	822	1.86
Francis Fayiah Sellu	Liberia Restoration Party	778	1.76
Arthur L. Wonbgaye	Liberia National Union	515	1.16
Daniel Dmx Davis	All Liberian Party	512	1.16
Joehandsome F. Weahweah	Coalition for Liberia's Progress	475	1.07
Robert B. Warnee Sr.	United People's Party	454	1.03
Anthony Aaron Zaizay	Victory for Change Party	435	0.98
Richard G. Sumo	Grassroot Democratic Party of Liberia	417	0.94
Cecelia Siaway Teah	Liberian People's Party	414	0.94
Migbeh Saye Gbartoe-Dor	True Whig Party	405	0.92
Sampson G. Sayway	New Liberia Party	317	0.72
Malian Kanneh Jalabah	Independent	311	0.70
Wolo Nagbe	Change Democratic Action	197	0.45
Stephen M. Harmon	Democratic Justice Party	170	0.38
Adolphus Benedict Parker	Independent	139	0.31
Total		44,235	100.00
Valid votes		44,235	94.04
Invalid/blank votes		2,803	5.96
Total votes		47,038	100.00
