= Montserrado-6 =

Electoral district in Liberia

- Constituency for the House of Representatives of Liberia
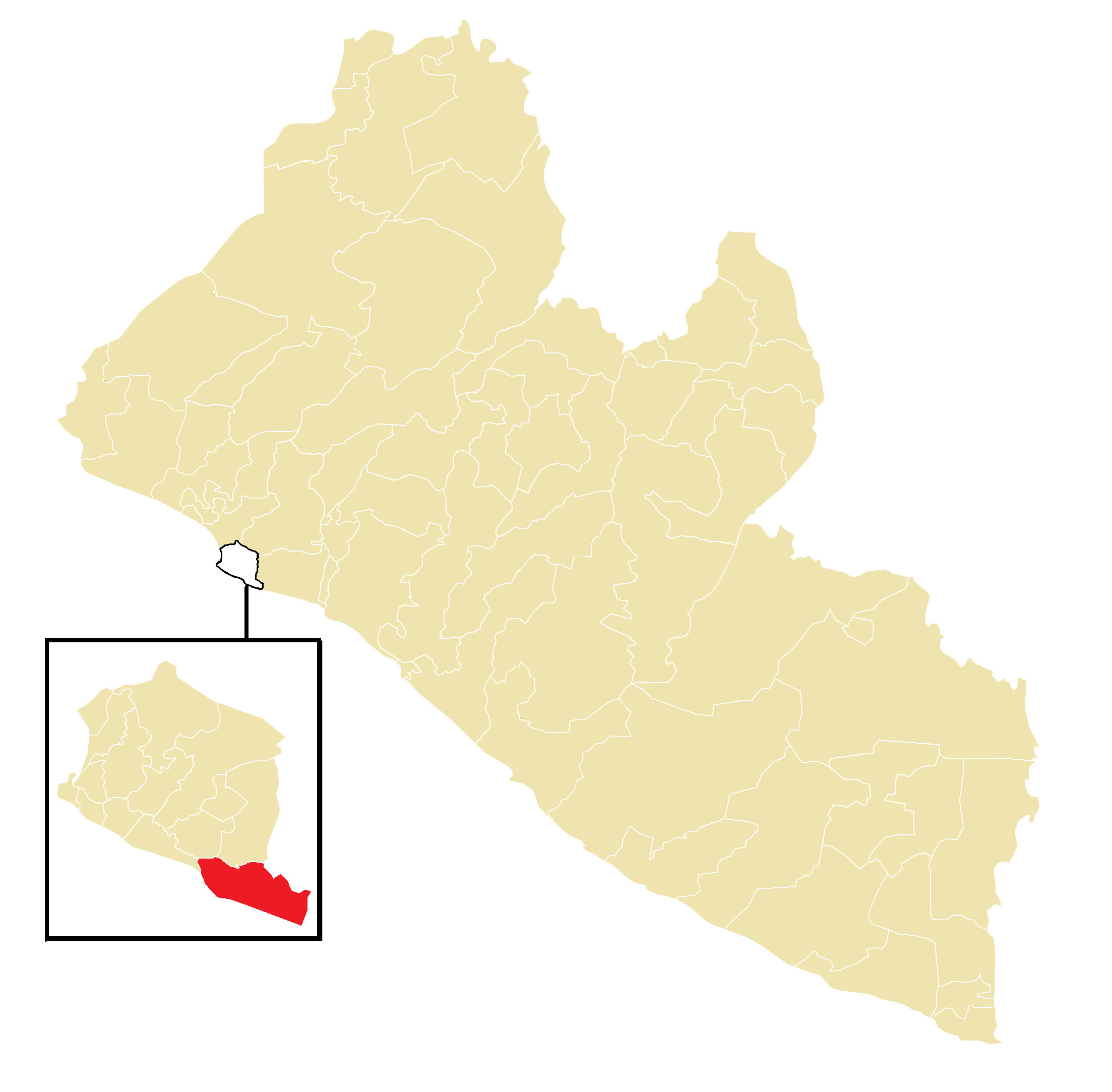
- Electorate: 61,958 (2023)

Current constituency
- Created: 2011; 15 years ago
- Representative: Samuel R. Enders

Montserrado-6 is an electoral district for the elections to the House of Representatives of Liberia. The district covers the Paynesville communities of S. D. Cooper, GSA Road Rockville, King Gray-ELWA, Kpelle Town and Rehab/Borbor Town.

== Elected representatives ==
Year	Representative elected	Party	Notes
2005	Kuku Younger Dorbor	LP	
2011	Edwin M. Snowe Jr	Ind.	
2017	Samuel R. Enders	Ind.	
2023	Samuel R. Enders	Ind.	

== Election results ==
2005 Montserrado County's 6th House District Election
Candidate	Party	Votes	%
Kuku Y. Dorbor	Liberty Party	6,816	28.78
Keturah B. Norman-Siebu	Unity Party	4,851	20.48
Teah W. Twehway	Congress for Democratic Change	4,520	19.09
Varney J. Mabande	National Patriotic Party	2,481	10.48
Emmanuel K. Jallah	Alliance for Peace and Democracy	2,088	8.82
D. C. Dedday	Coalition for the Transformation of Liberia	1,653	6.98
Abraham K. Donzo	Progressive Democratic Party	876	3.70
Dickson D. Zawiea	Liberia Destiny Party	396	1.67
Total		23,681	100.00
Valid votes		23,681	94.60
Invalid/blank votes		1,351	5.40
Total votes		25,032	100.00

2011 Montserrado County's 6th House District Election
Candidate	Party	Votes	%
Edwin Snowe	Independent	13,262	51.03
Meapeh Kou Gono-Glay	Congress for Democratic Change	4,548	17.50
Joseph Payequiyah Todd	Independent	2,493	9.59
Uriah Glaybo	Grassroot Democratic Party of Liberia	1,754	6.75
Shirley Kaydea Sherman	Independent	1,514	5.83
Jarsieh Josiah Belleh	Liberia Transformation Party	736	2.83
Sam Mohammed Kromah	Liberty Party	651	2.50
Amos Yarko Flomo	Progressive Democratic Party	580	2.23
Vickie Wannie Wilson	Liberia Empowerment Party	332	1.28
Augustine Baccus Dukie Kimber	Movement for Progressive Change	121	0.47
Total		25,991	100.00
Valid votes		25,991	94.84
Invalid/blank votes		1,415	5.16
Total votes		27,406	100.00

2017 Montserrado County's 6th House District Election
Candidate	Party	Votes	%
Samuel R. Enders	Independent	18,489	45.15
Joseph Payequiyah Todd	Coalition for Democratic Change	6,653	16.25
Martin Saye Kollah	Liberty Party	4,939	12.06
Henry P. Costa	All Liberian Party	3,287	8.03
Samuel B. Jacobs	Movement for Democracy and Reconstruction	1,841	4.50
Uriah Glaybo	Democratic Justice Party	1,558	3.80
Kanvee Gaines Adams	Alternative National Congress	1,505	3.68
Reginald K. S. Taylor	Independent	607	1.48
Thomas Blah	Redemption Democratic Congress	405	0.99
K. Solomon Sawyer Sr.	Coalition for Liberia's Progress	346	0.84
Rufus King Tull	Liberia Transformation Party	306	0.75
Thomas Gideon Goba Sr.	People's Unification Party	276	0.67
Esther Rufus	Movement for Economic Empowerment	262	0.64
Irene N. Gould Murvee	United People's Party	196	0.48
Jargbah A. Jargbah	Vision for Liberia Transformation	177	0.43
Hinali A. Ajime	Movement for Progressive Change	101	0.25
Total		40,948	100.00
Valid votes		40,948	96.33
Invalid/blank votes		1,558	3.67
Total votes		42,506	100.00
