= Montserrado-9 =

Electoral district for the House of representatives in Liberia

- Constituency for the House of Representatives of Liberia
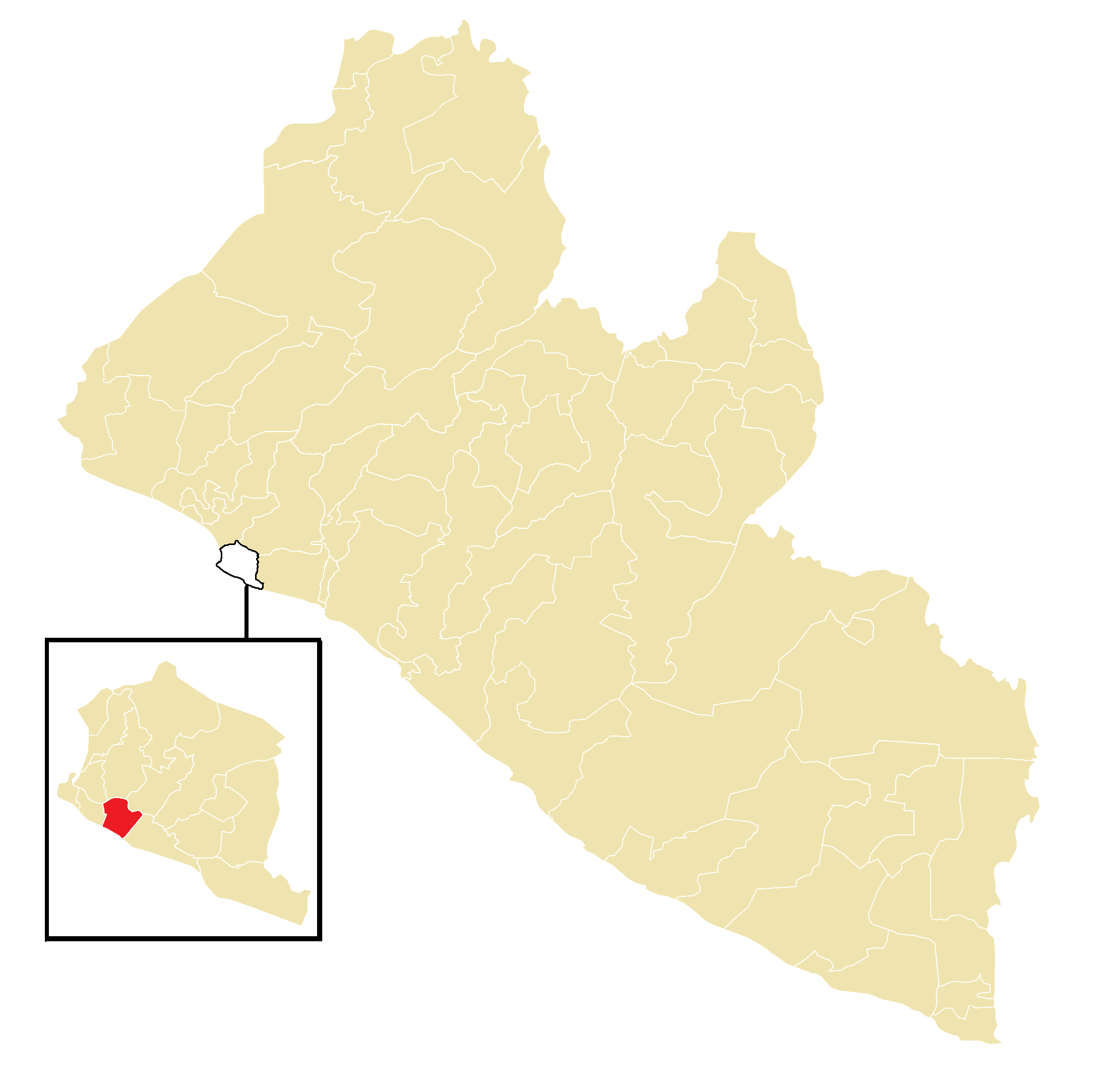
- Electorate: 44,038 (2023)

Current constituency
- Created: 2011
- Representative: Frank Saah Foko, Jr.

Montserrado-9 is an electoral district for the elections to the House of Representatives of Liberia. The district covers the Monrovia communities of ICA Camp, Pyne People, Fiama, Fiama East, Fish Market, Gbangaye Town, Wroto Town, Raymond Field, Central Lakpazee, Old Matadi and New Matadi, as well as the eastern parts of Cooper Clinic and Ocean View communities. The 12th Street constitutes the boundary between Montserrado-8.

== Elected representatives ==
Year	Representative elected	Party	Notes
2005	Moses Saah Tandanpolie Sr.	CDC	
2011	Munah E. Pelham	CDC	
2017	Munah E. Pelham-Youngblood	CDC	Died in office.
2020	Frank Saah Foko Jr.	CDC	
2023	Frank Saah Foko Jr.	CDC	

== Election results ==
2005 Montserrado County's 9th House District Election
Candidate	Party	Votes	%
Moses Saah Tandanpolie Sr.	Congress for Democratic Change	6,335	23.08
Nerissa F. Kamara	Unity Party	4,789	17.45
Joseph S. Momolu	Union of Liberian Democrats	2,580	9.40
Baryonic W. Sherman Sr.	Liberty Party	2,467	8.99
Mohammed M. Massalay	All Liberia Coalition Party	2,373	8.65
Dennis E. Chattah	Liberia Equal Rights Party	2,080	7.58
Andrew B. Jaye	Alliance for Peace and Democracy	1,644	5.99
Cecelia K. Cooper	Free Democratic Party	1,427	5.20
Francis F. Wisseh	Coalition for the Transformation of Liberia	1,409	5.13
John H. Kollie Sr.	National Patriotic Party	1,267	4.62
L. K. Sherif	United Democratic Alliance	581	2.12
Gabriel T. Kumeh	Freedom Alliance Party of Liberia	495	1.80
Total		27,447	100.00
Valid votes		27,447	94.51
Invalid/blank votes		1,593	5.49
Total votes		29,040	100.00

2011 Montserrado County's 9th House District Election
Candidate	Party	Votes	%
Munah E. Pelham	Congress for Democratic Change	6,634	25.01
B. Miller Catakaw	Unity Party	4,928	18.58
Ivan I. F. Tumbey II	Independent	3,235	12.19
John Nester Randall Jr.	Independent	2,238	8.44
Moncio Robert D. W. Kpadeh	Independent	1,484	5.59
Grace Bemah Yates	Independent	889	3.35
Thomas Saidy Bah Kaydor Jr.	National Democratic Coalition	871	3.28
E. Murana Sheriff	Independent	744	2.80
James Kormon	Liberia Destiny Party	727	2.74
George Saye Dahn Sr.	Independent	724	2.73
Una Kumba Thompson	Independent	636	2.40
J. Elder Jallah	Liberty Party	593	2.24
Michael K. Kesselly	Victory for Change Party	502	1.89
Beyan Gorballah Kota	Independent	482	1.82
Kettehkumuehn Earl Murray	All Liberia Coalition Party	452	1.70
Fubbi F. A. Henries	Independent	390	1.47
Molley Varney Kromah	Movement for Progressive Change	373	1.41
James D. Hallowanger	National Union for Democratic Progress	234	0.88
Amos Dorbor Gayflor	Liberia Transformation Party	228	0.86
Seltue Robert Karweaye	Liberia Restoration Party	165	0.62
Total		26,529	100.00
Valid votes		26,529	95.24
Invalid/blank votes		1,327	4.76
Total votes		27,856	100.00

2017 Montserrado County's 9th House District Election
Candidate	Party	Votes	%
Munah Pelham-Youngblood (Incumbent)	Coalition for Democratic Change	12,783	40.32
Fubbi F. A. Henries	Alternative National Congress	8,675	27.36
B. Miller Catakaw	Unity Party	5,862	18.49
Joe Kpoto	All Liberian Party	2,033	6.41
Jeanetta Koyah Johnson	Liberty Party	734	2.32
Grace Bemah Yates	True Whig Party	519	1.64
Lawrence A. Flomo	Movement for Economic Empowerment	300	0.95
Landry K. Gaie Jr.	United People's Party	263	0.83
Emmanuel Wru-Pour Cooper	Independent	194	0.61
David S. O. Smith III	Liberia Transformation Party	123	0.39
George R. Smith	Liberia Restoration Party	121	0.38
Prince J. Polee	Vision for Liberia Transformation	95	0.30
Total		31,702	100.00
Valid votes		31,702	97.51
Invalid/blank votes		809	2.49
Total votes		32,511	100.00

2020 Montserrado County 9th House District By-election
Candidate	Party	Votes	%
Frank Saah Foko Jr.	Coalition for Democratic Change	8,650	33.92
Fubbi Franklin Armah Henries	Collaborating Political Parties	8,542	33.50
Cyvette Gibson	Independent	3,211	12.59
B. Miller Catakaw	Independent	2,557	10.03
Edmond K. P. P. Lloyd	Independent	904	3.54
James Salinsa Debbah	Independent	753	2.95
Saah Roberts	Rainbow Alliance	597	2.34
Rahaile M. Foday	Movement for One Liberia	287	1.13
Total		25,501	100.00
Valid votes		25,501	96.79
Invalid/blank votes		845	3.21
Total votes		26,346	100.00
