= Thomas Nimene Botoe =

Liberian politician

Thomas Nimene Botoe (December 25, 1912 – August 20, 1969) was a Liberian politician, Governor of the Kru Community in Monrovia.

During the presidency of William V.S. Tubman, he was accused of a role in "The Plot That Failed". Along with Nettie-Sie Brownell, Gbaflen Davies, and S. Raymond Horace, he was charged with sedition and high treason, and jailed and tortured. He was eventually pardoned by Tubman along with the other leaders and finally exonerated by President William R. Tolbert Jr, in 1974 after Tubman's death. A street named Botoe Avenue in New Kru Town was dedicated in his honor.
