= New Georgia, Liberia =

Coordinates: 6°22′N 10°46′W

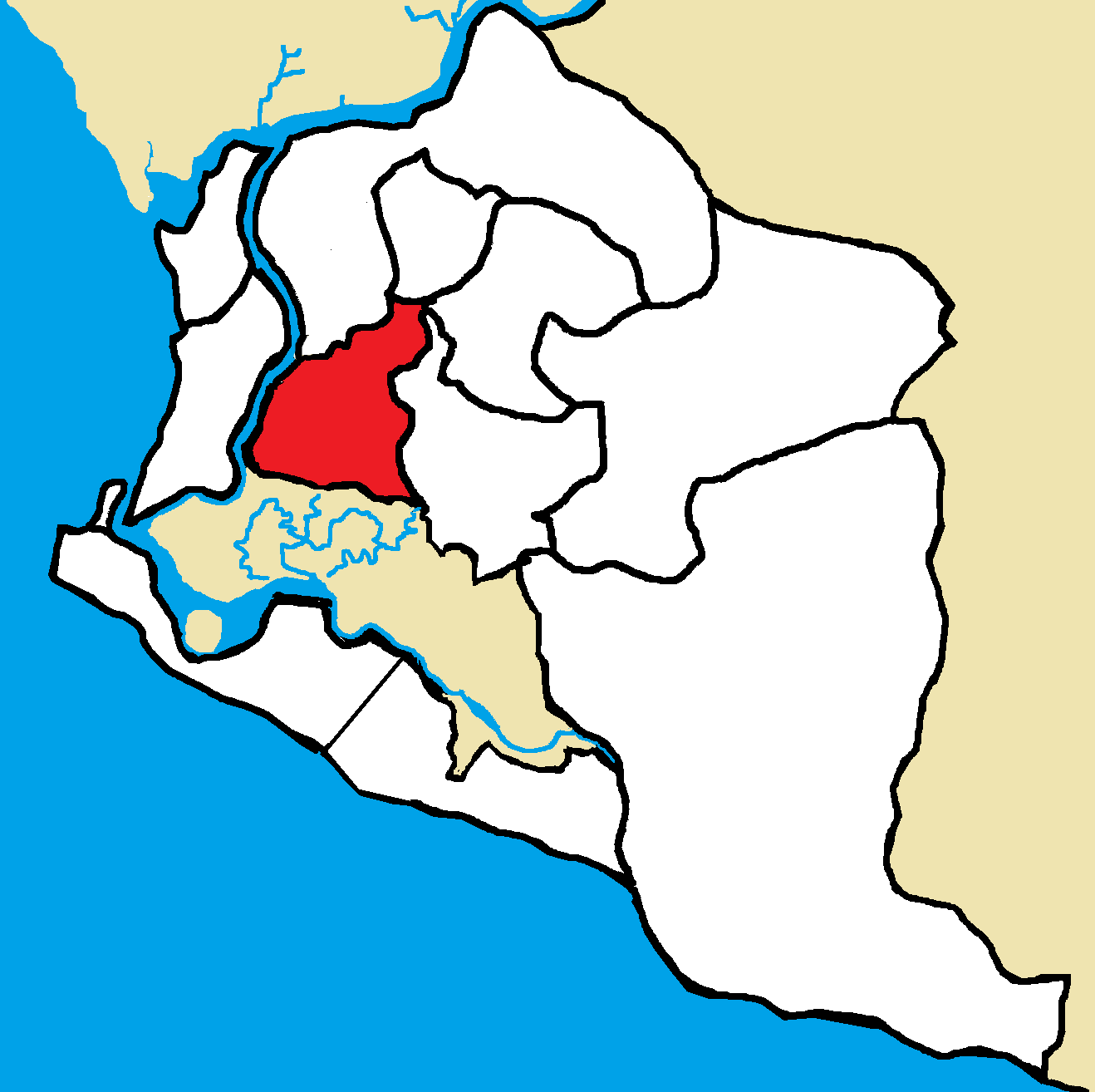
Location of New Georgia within the Greater Monrovia District

New Georgia is a township in Montserrado County, Liberia that was first settled by Africans who had been taken from slave ships that were seized or wrecked near the United States, then sent to Liberia after several years had passed.

== History ==
In July 1827 a ship named Norfolk carried 131, 143 or 144 Africans to Liberia from the United States, of whom 78 were adult women and another eleven or twelve were under ten years of age. One hundred twenty of those people had been found on the slave ship Antelope when it was seized off the coast of Florida in 1820. They had been held in Georgia for seven years waiting for the courts to settle their fate. After being kept under supervision in Monrovia for a while, the people from the Antelope were settled along Stockton Creek on Bushrod Island about four miles up the Mesurado River from Monrovia. The settlement was named New Georgia after their home of the prior seven years. Although "recaptured" Africans (people taken from slave ships by U.S. Navy anti-slave trade patrol ships) had been brought to Liberia previously, none were still there when the people from the Antelope arrived. Most, if not all, of the people found on the Antelope in 1820 and taken to Liberia in 1827 had originally been loaded on slave ships at Cabinda, and were probably Kongo people.

In March 1830 92 African men who had survived the 1827 wreck of the slave ship Guerrero near Key Largo, Florida were brought to Liberia from the United States and settled at New Georgia. These men were mostly Igbos and "Persas" or "Pessas". About 150 people who had been freed from coastal slaving stations by Americo-Liberians also settled in New Georgia.

In the 1830s New Georgia consisted of separate communities of Congos and Igbos separated by a small rivulet, with a total of about 300 people. The "recaptured" Africans at New Georgia had inter-married between the groups and many of the men married women from local tribes. There was a schoolhouse for the children, and the town was described as being pleasing in appearance. Houses in New Georgia were surrounded by vegetable and fruit gardens and the town was surrounded by fields where maize, rice, cassava and vegetables were grown. New Georgia was an important supplier to the market in Monrovia. The men of the town also sawed lumber and made shingles. The people of New Georgia prospered, and were described as "decidedly the most contented and independent of any in the colony." New Georgia is listed as one of the settlements making up the Commonwealth of Liberia in the 1839 Constitution. In 1878 a traveler reported about 500 people living in New Georgia.

As of 2009 a bridge connecting New Georgia with Barnersville was under construction. The new bridge would replace one that was built in 1992 for military purposes by peacekeepers from the Economic Community of West African States Monitoring Group. The badly deteriorated bridge had been closed to vehicle traffic for several years before it collapsed in 2009. Also as of 2009 a new elementary school operated by the United Methodist Church was under construction in New Georgia.

== Demographics ==
New Georgia (or Zone Z1300) is divided into eleven communities;

Community	Inhabitants (2014 est.)	No. of Households (2014 est.)
Bassa Town	2,524	616
Battery Factory	4,869	1,188
Chocolate City A	5,961	1,454
Chocolate City B	6,025	1,470
Flahn Town	5,417	1,321
Iron Factory	3,966	967
New Georgia	5,700	1,390
New Georgia Estate	9,753	2,379
Old Field Gulf Sign Board	9,739	2,375
SOS Transit	5,877	1,433
Topoe Village	6,345	1,548
Total:	66,176	16,141

== Government ==
In 2018 President George Weah appointed Lewis K. Wleh, Sr. as Commissioner for New Georgia.

New Georgia is part of the Montserrado-13 electoral district.
