= Montserrado-10 =

Electoral district in Liberia

- Constituency for the House of Representatives of Liberia
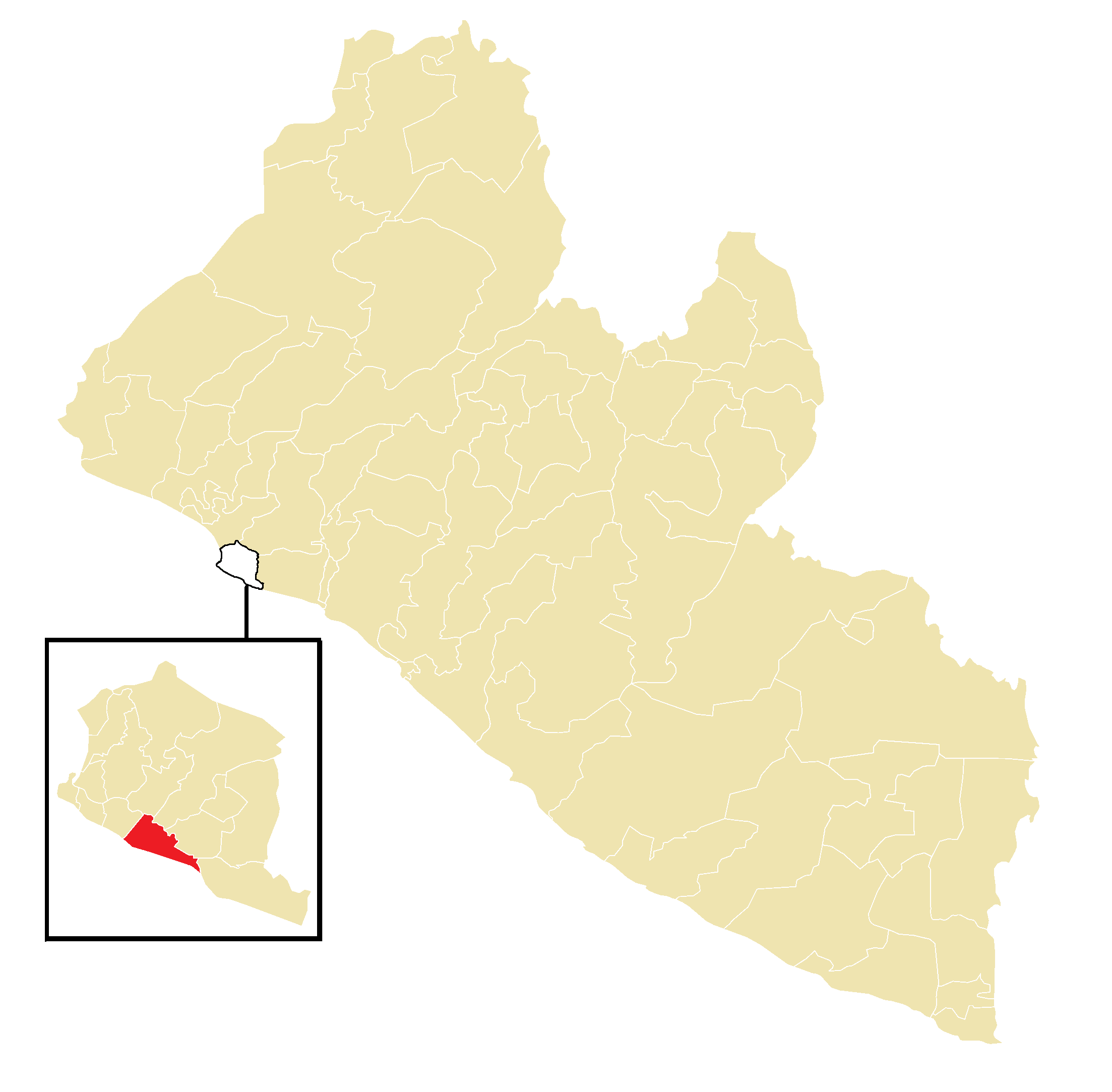
- Electorate: 57,119 (2023)

Current constituency
- Created: 2011
- Representative: Yekeh Kolubah

Montserrado-10 is an electoral district for the elections to the House of Representatives of Liberia. The district covers all of the communities of the Congo Town township, except Pagos Island and Swankamore.

== Elected representatives ==
Year	Representative elected	Party	Notes
2005	Regina Sokan Teah	CDC	
2011	Julius F. Berrian	CDC	
2017	Yekeh Kolubah	Ind.	
2023	Yekeh Kolubah	Ind.	

== Election results ==
2005 Montserrado County's 10th House District Election
Candidate	Party	Votes	%
Regina S. Teah	Congress for Democratic Change	10,910	41.87
Abraham V. Corneh	National Patriotic Party	3,856	14.80
Moivee C. Dennis	Liberty Party	2,999	11.51
Stephen F. Kimba	Unity Party	2,977	11.43
M. B. Jaleiba Jr.	Coalition for the Transformation of Liberia	2,732	10.49
Fomba K. Sirleaf	All Liberia Coalition Party	2,580	9.90
Total		26,054	100.00
Valid votes		26,054	95.39
Invalid/blank votes		1,259	4.61
Total votes		27,313	100.00

2011 Montserrado County's 10th House District Election
Candidate	Party	Votes	%
Julius F. Berrian	Congress for Democratic Change	6,820	25.53
Yekeh Y. Kolubah	Independent	6,211	23.25
George Bobby Kailondo	Unity Party	4,353	16.30
David Gomon Benitoe	Independent	3,253	12.18
Fatu J. Massaley	Liberty Party	2,809	10.52
David M. Kolleh Jr.	All Liberia Coalition Party	1,239	4.64
Siah Vanesser McCarthy Hare	Liberia Transformation Party	678	2.54
Sam Jaymu Brown	National Union for Democratic Progress	562	2.10
Konah Lawrence Parker	Independent	388	1.45
Bill Nathaniel Ross III	National Democratic Coalition	214	0.80
P. Sayon Menyon	Liberia Destiny Party	183	0.69
Total		26,710	100.00
Valid votes		26,710	94.72
Invalid/blank votes		1,488	5.28
Total votes		28,198	100.00

2017 Montserrado County's 10th House District Election
Candidate	Party	Votes	%
Yekeh Kolubah	Independent	13,884	43.42
Julius F. Berrian (Incumbent)	People's Unification Party	4,452	13.92
Mulbah K. Morlu Jr.	Coalition for Democratic Change	4,330	13.54
Audrey Mazoe Johnson	Independent	1,409	4.41
Calvin A. Diggs	Alternative National Congress	1,395	4.36
Albert J. B. Cooper	Independent	1,217	3.81
Baseh F. Cooper Sr.	Liberty Party	1,146	3.58
David G. Benitoe	Liberia Transformation Party	659	2.06
C. Wellington Morgan	All Liberian Party	659	2.06
Mohammed Action Sonie	Democratic Justice Party	568	1.78
Eunice Davis Gardiner	Independent	469	1.47
Robert S. Bestman II	Liberian People's Party	391	1.22
Leo Mulbah	Movement for Economic Empowerment	299	0.93
Stephen Allen Tolbert II	Independent	271	0.85
Obadiah Kbemeti Moiseemah	Vision for Liberia Transformation	241	0.75
Jerry Gabriel Morris	United People's Party	168	0.53
Alpha Bird Collins	True Whig Party	156	0.49
Elizabeth M. G. Zarwea	Movement for Democracy and Reconstruction	143	0.45
Johnson T. Blojeh	Liberia Restoration Party	122	0.38
Total		31,979	100.00
Valid votes		31,979	96.43
Invalid/blank votes		1,184	3.57
Total votes		33,163	100.00
