= Swankamore =

- Community
- Country: Liberia
- County: Montserrado County
- District: Greater Monrovia
- City: Congo Town

Population (2014)
  - Total: 5,036

Swankamore is a community in Congo Town, Greater Monrovia District, Liberia. The community is located SKD Boulevard.

As of 2014 the population of Key & Death Hole was estimated at 5,036. Swankamore is part of the Montserrado-5 electoral district.

As of 2018 there were reports of plans for the construction of a Hilton Hotel in the community.
