= New Kru Town =

- Borough
- Location in Liberia
- Coordinates: 6°22′24″N 10°47′34″W
- Country: Liberia
- County: Montserrado County
- District: Greater Monrovia

Government
  - Governor: Robert B. Teah

Area
  - Total: 5.13 km^{2} (1.98 sq mi)

Population (2014)
  - Total: 84,399
  - Density: 16,500/km^{2} (42,600/sq mi)
- Time zone: UTC+0 (GMT)

New Kru Town is a northwestern coastal suburb of Monrovia, Liberia.

== Overview ==
New Kru Town is a northwestern coastal suburb of Monrovia, located on the north end of Bushrod Island. It is the only borough in Liberia.

The town grew as a planned "transplant" town of Old Kru Town after World War II when "Old Kru Town was evacuated for the development of a new breakwater for the new port with assistance from the Liberian government". Being located where the Saint Paul River estuary meets the Atlantic Ocean, sea-fishing is an important source of income.

A slum area, it has been subject to ethnic tensions. Squatted houses are built in precarious zones and in 2013, 200 homes were washed away by a high tide. In 2019 President George Weah appointed Tarpeh D. Carter as governor of New Kru Town, replacing Alice Weah. New Kru Town constitutes the Montserrado-16 electoral district.

== Landmarks ==
An "imposing" church was built in New Kru Town in about 1975 by American missionaries. It also contains the Redemption Hospital and the multi-million dollar D. Tweh Memorial High School, "originally named in honor of Tolbert before the 1980 coup". An avenue, Botoe Avenue, is named after Thomas Nimene Botoe.

== Demographics ==
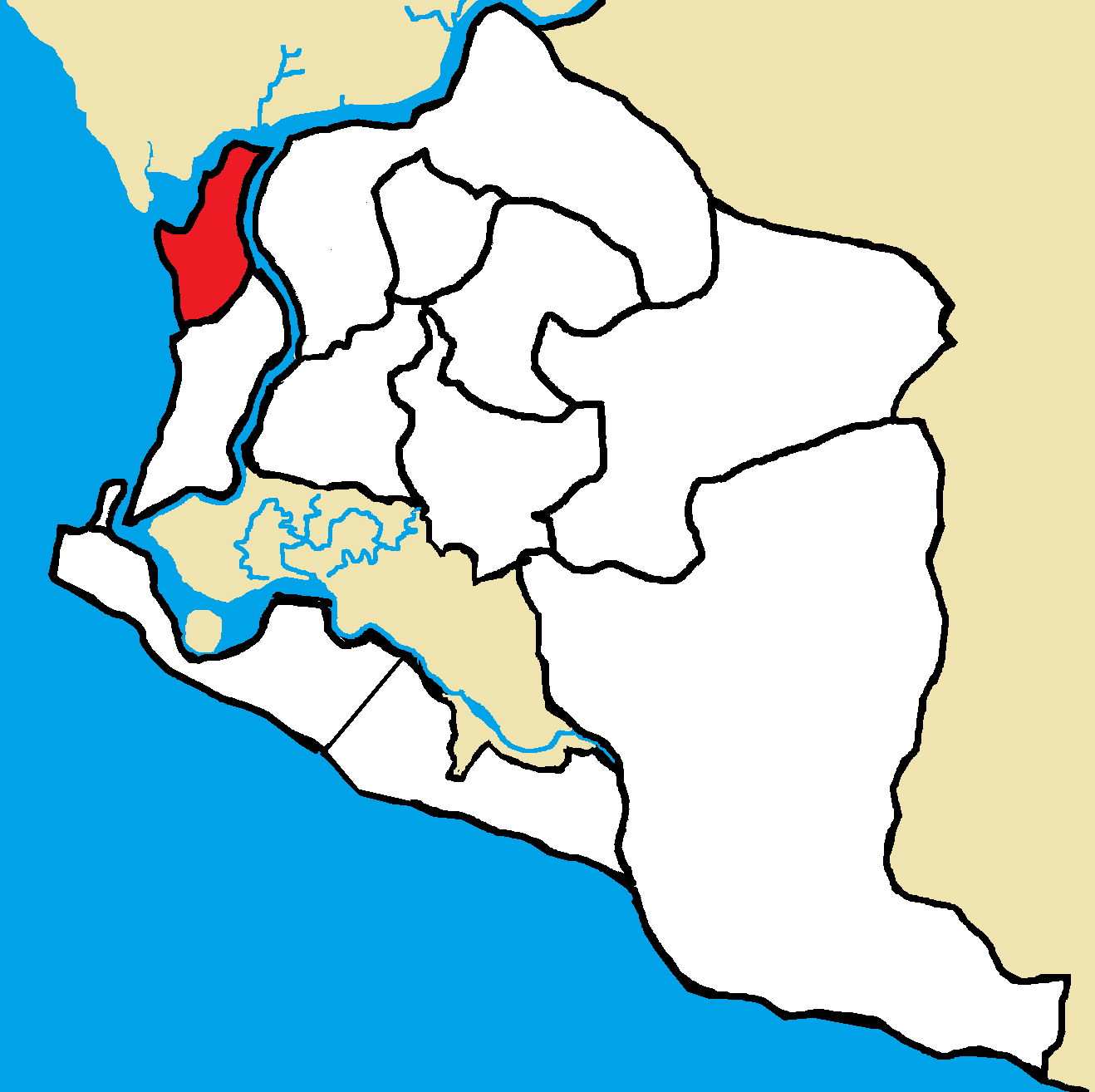
New Kru Town within the Greater Monrovia District

New Kru Town (or Zone Z100) is divided into 14 communities;

| Community | Inhabitants (2014 est.) | No. of households (2014 est.) |
|---|---|---|
| Bong Mines Bridge | 5,573 | 1,359 |
| Central New Kru Town | 5,880 | 1,434 |
| Crab Hole | 7,532 | 1,837 |
| Duala Market | 6,405 | 1,562 |
| Duala Mombo Town-East | 8,752 | 2,135 |
| Fundaye | 4,259 | 1,039 |
| Lagoon East | 5,405 | 1,318 |
| Lagoon West | 5,575 | 1,360 |
| Monboe Town West | 3,475 | 848 |
| Nyuan Town | 6,692 | 1,632 |
| Point Four | 7,317 | 1,785 |
| Popo Beach A | 5,938 | 1,448 |
| Popo Beach B | 2,913 | 710 |
| Tweh Farm | 8,683 | 2,118 |
| Total: | 84,399 | 20,585 |
