= Caldwell, Liberia =

Township in Montserrado County, Liberia

Coordinates: 6°24′N 10°44′W

Caldwell is a township located in Montserrado County, Liberia. Caldwell was one of the four townships established in the first wave of colonization (between 1822 and 1827). It is listed as one of the original settlements comprising the Commonwealth of Liberia in the 1839 Constitution, which was drafted by the American Colonization Society. The name comes from Elias B. Caldwell and family, about 1816, Presbyterians in what became Caldwell, New Jersey.

== Government ==
In 2018 President George Weah appointed Francis Woods as Commissioner for Caldwell.

The western parts of Caldwell township (New Georgia Road, Caldwell Community, Central Caldwell) are part of the Montserrado-15 electoral district. The eastern parts of Caldwell township (Caldwell Market, Dixville Water Side, Upper Caldwell, Samukai Town and Cassava Hill) are part of the Montserrado-11 electoral district.

== Demographics ==
Caldwell township is divided into eight communities;

Community	Inhabitants (2014 est.)	No. of Households (2014 est.)
Caldwell Community	4,456	1,087
Caldwell Market	3,817	931
Cassava Hill	437	106
Central Caldwell	3,308	807
Dixville Water Side	1,092	266
New Georgia Road	7,474	1,823
Samukai Town	1,844	450
Upper Caldwell	3,807	929
