= Montserrado-8 =

Electoral district in Liberia

- Constituency for the House of Representatives of Liberia
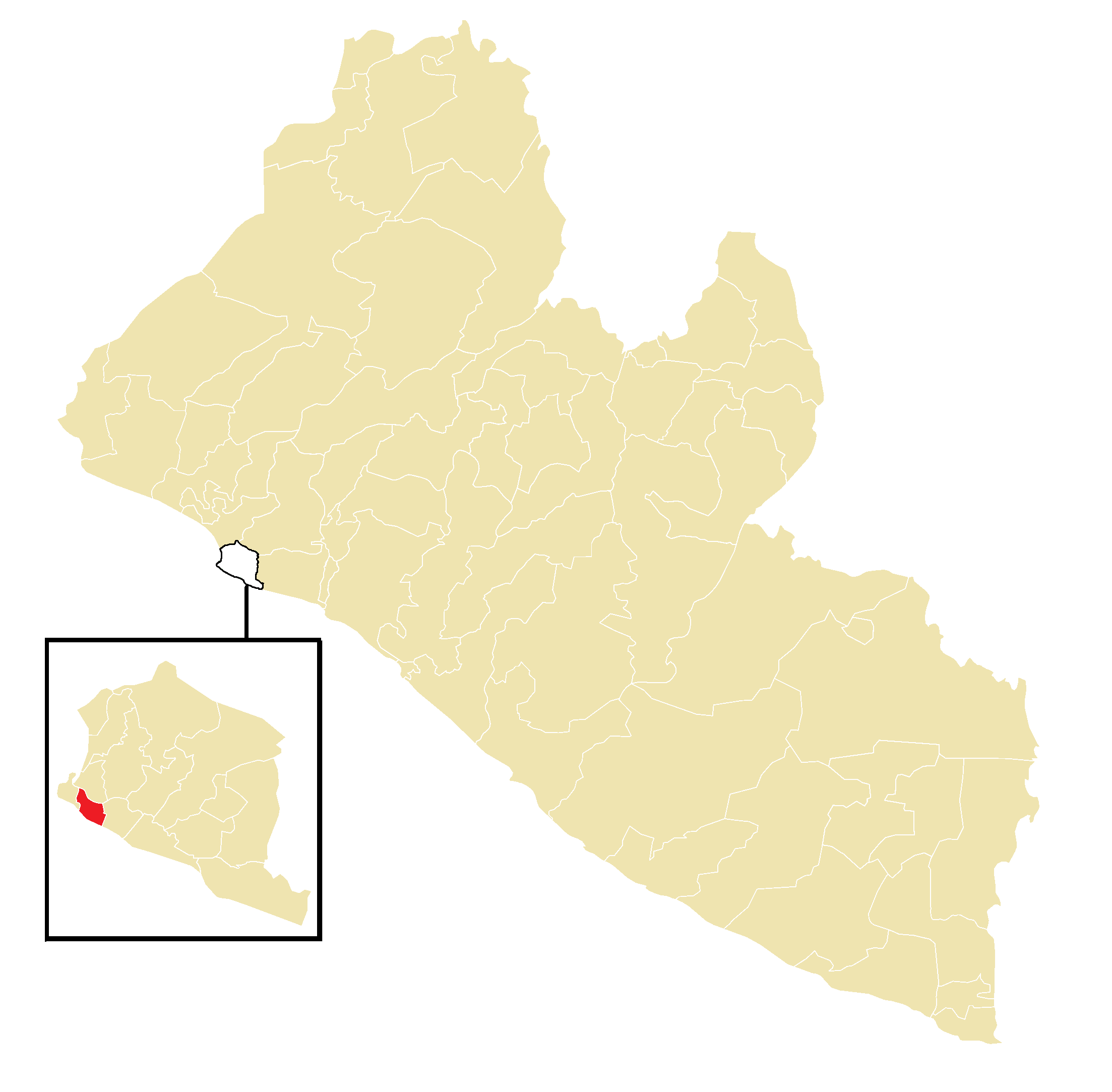
- Electorate: 36,899 (2023)

Current constituency
- Created: 2011
- Representative: Prince A. Toles

Montserrado-8 is an electoral district for the elections to the House of Representatives of Liberia. The district covers the Monrovia communities of Bassa Community, Bernard Quarters, Bishop Brooks, Buzzi Quarters, Capitol Hill, Crown Hill, Jallah Town, Maternity Community, Rock Spring Valley, Plumkor, Saye Town Slipway, Soniwein and Warwein, as well as the western parts of Cooper Clinic and Ocean View communities. The 12th Street constitutes the boundary between Montserrado-8 and Montserrado-9.

== Elected representatives ==
Year	Representative elected	Party	Notes
2005	Dave Koomey	CDC	
2011	Acarous M. Gray	CDC	
2017	Acarous M. Gray	CDC	
2023	Prince A. Toles	UP	

== Election results ==
2005 Montserrado County's 8th House District Election
Candidate	Party	Votes	%
Dave Koomey	Congress for Democratic Change	5,739	21.28
Nyenekon B. Snoh-Barcon	Unity Party	5,266	19.52
J. Gabriel S. Nyenka	New Deal Movement	4,403	16.32
Samuel S. Fayiah	Liberty Party	4,310	15.98
Tawah Y. Augustine	Free Democratic Party	1,637	6.07
Doris D. Tucker	Coalition for the Transformation of Liberia	1,580	5.86
Benetta J. Fisher	National Patriotic Party	1,385	5.13
Kpengba F. Fayiaa	National Democratic Party of Liberia	1,287	4.77
Stephen S. Saysay	Union of Liberian Democrats	1,016	3.77
George L. Sieh	Freedom Alliance Party of Liberia	350	1.30
Total		26,973	100.00
Valid votes		26,973	95.11
Invalid/blank votes		1,386	4.89
Total votes		28,359	100.00

2011 Montserrado County's 8th House District Election
Candidate	Party	Votes	%
Acarous M. Gray	Congress for Democratic Change	9,148	32.04
Jeremiah Q. Krah	Unity Party	3,440	12.05
Wilfred Garpu Peters	Independent	3,400	11.91
Mustapha Waritay	Independent	2,470	8.65
Rufus Dio Neufville	Independent	2,423	8.49
William Kpanah-Gowah Barnes	Independent	1,834	6.42
Clifford Johnson Young Sr.	Independent	1,351	4.73
Prince A. Toles	Liberty Party	929	3.25
Theophilus Julukon Nelson	Independent	735	2.57
Dedeh Larmee Sorbor	Victory for Change Party	637	2.23
Emmanuel Geordo Crusoe	Grassroot Democratic Party of Liberia	457	1.60
Madison Friley Smith	Liberia Reconstruction Party	384	1.35
Joe Wylie	National Democratic Coalition	360	1.26
Rufus G. Towahsam	National Union for Democratic Progress	309	1.08
Tugbeh Philip Massaquoi	National Democratic Party of Liberia	243	0.85
Torkonlon II O. T. Weedor	Liberia Transformation Party	227	0.80
Al William Green	Citizens Unification Party	203	0.71
Total		28,550	100.00
Valid votes		28,550	94.56
Invalid/blank votes		1,642	5.44
Total votes		30,192	100.00

2017 Montserrado County's 8th House District Election
Candidate	Party	Votes	%
Acarous M. Gray (Incumbent)	Coalition for Democratic Change	5,474	20.10
Prince A. Toles	Liberty Party	3,704	13.60
George Abu Miller	Coalition for Liberia's Progress	3,113	11.43
Ishmeal M. Sheriff	Independent	2,665	9.79
Wellington Masilee Bright	Unity Party	2,000	7.34
Wilfred Garpu Peters	True Whig Party	1,563	5.74
Jacob Barnes	Independent	1,212	4.45
James N. N. Fallah	Movement for Progressive Change	1,038	3.81
Jonathan Varney Koffa	Alternative National Congress	976	3.58
Michael T. K. Davies	Change Democratic Action	931	3.42
Clifford Johnson Young	Independent	714	2.62
Varfee T. J. Quaye	Movement for Economic Empowerment	534	1.96
Bella Diallo	Liberian People's Party	522	1.92
Stephen Lec Togba	United People's Party	466	1.71
Celestin G. Sepoe	Independent	462	1.70
Ciatta T. Bambara	Redemption Democratic Congress	438	1.61
Joseph Sunnae Kannah Jr.	All Liberian Party	367	1.35
James S. Gbollie	Grassroot Democratic Party of Liberia	279	1.02
James Oscar Soloe Sr.	Liberia National Union	262	0.96
Edward Benedict Palmer	Independent	227	0.83
Jefferson D. Coleman	Liberia Transformation Party	148	0.54
Florence C. Kaydee	Liberia Restoration Party	139	0.51
Total		27,234	100.00
Valid votes		27,234	96.61
Invalid/blank votes		956	3.39
Total votes		28,190	100.00
