= Montserrado-13 =

Electoral district in Liberia

- Constituency for the House of Representatives of Liberia
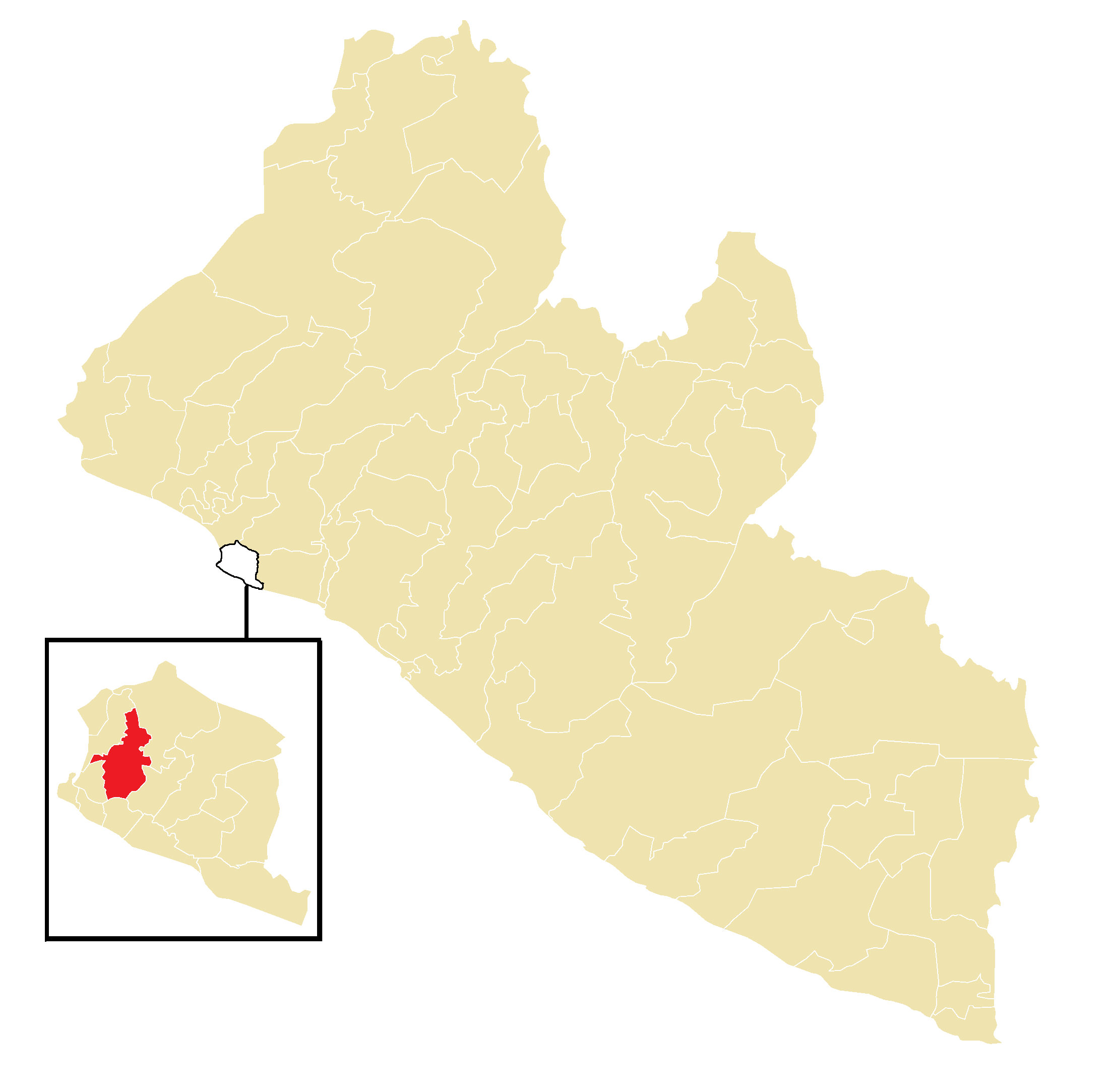
- Electorate: 49,468 (2023)

Current constituency
- Created: 2011
- Representative: Edward P. Flomo

Montserrado-13 is an electoral district for the elections to the House of Representatives of Liberia. The district covers the New Georgia Township as well as the St. Michael community of Gardnersville Township and the Stockton Creek and Jamaica Road communities of Garwolon Township.

== Elected representatives ==
Year	Representative elected	Party	Notes
2005	Victoria Lynch	CDC	
2011	Saah H. Joseph	CDC	
2017	Saah H. Joseph	CDC	Resigned after elected to the Senate.
2018	Edward P. Flomo	Ind.	
2023	Edward P. Flomo	CDC	
