= Montserrado-16 =

Electoral district in Liberia

- Constituency for the House of Representatives of Liberia
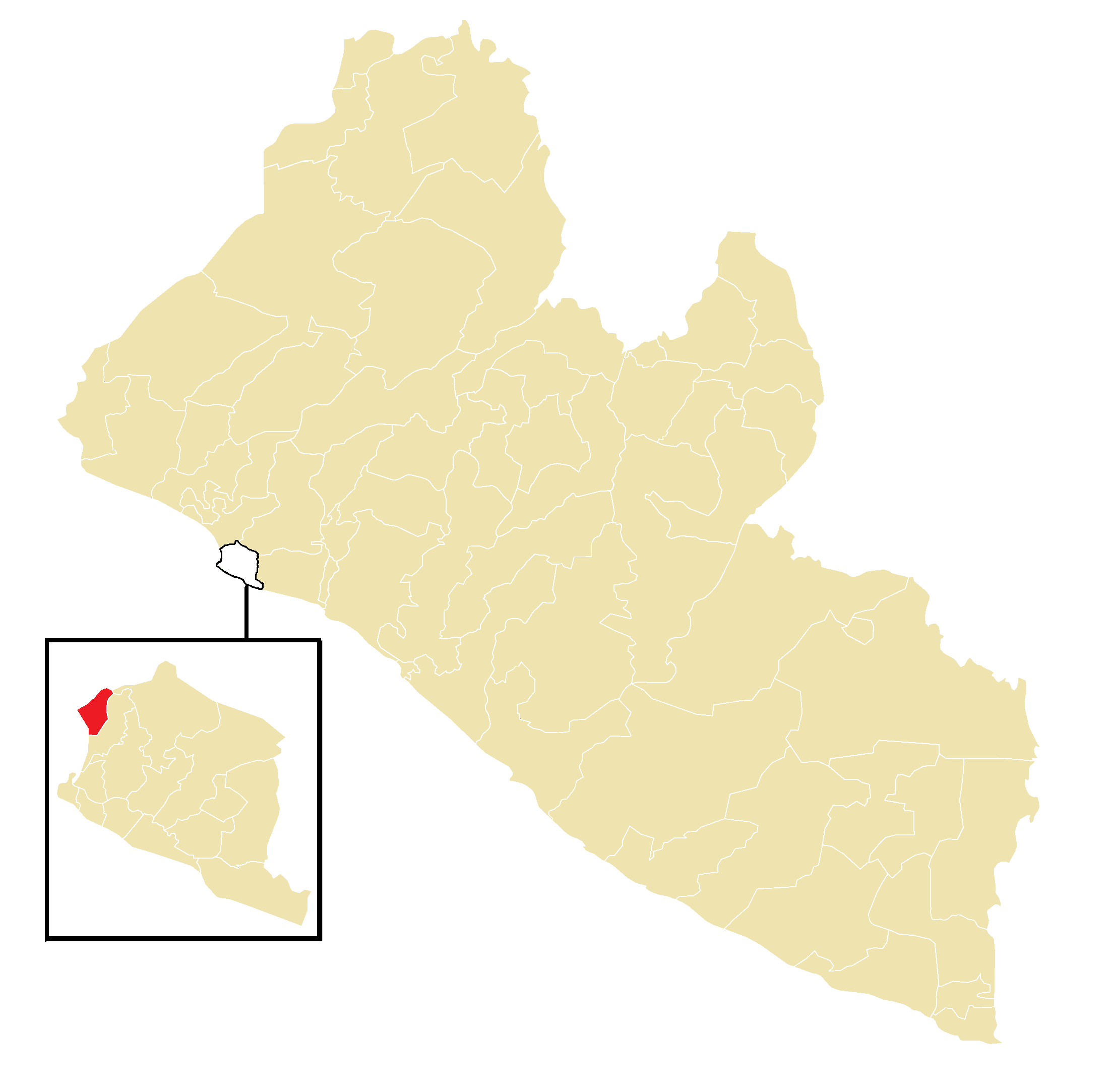
- Electorate: 48,302 (2023)

Current constituency
- Created: 2011
- Representative: Dixon W. Seboe

Montserrado-16 is an electoral district for the elections to the House of Representatives of Liberia. The district covers the borough of New Kru Town.

== Elected representatives ==
| Year | Representative elected | Party | Notes |
|---|---|---|---|
| 2011 | Edward S. Forh | Ind. | |
| 2017 | Dixon W. Seboe | CDC | |
| 2023 | Dixon W. Seboe | CDC | |
