= Gardnersville =

- Township
- Location in Liberia
- Coordinates: 6°20′31″N 10°44′0″W
- Country: Liberia
- County: Montserrado County
- District: Greater Monrovia

Government
  - Commissioner: Rev. David Roberts
- Time zone: UTC+0 (GMT)

Gardnersville or Gardnesville is a township in the Greater Monrovia District, Liberia.

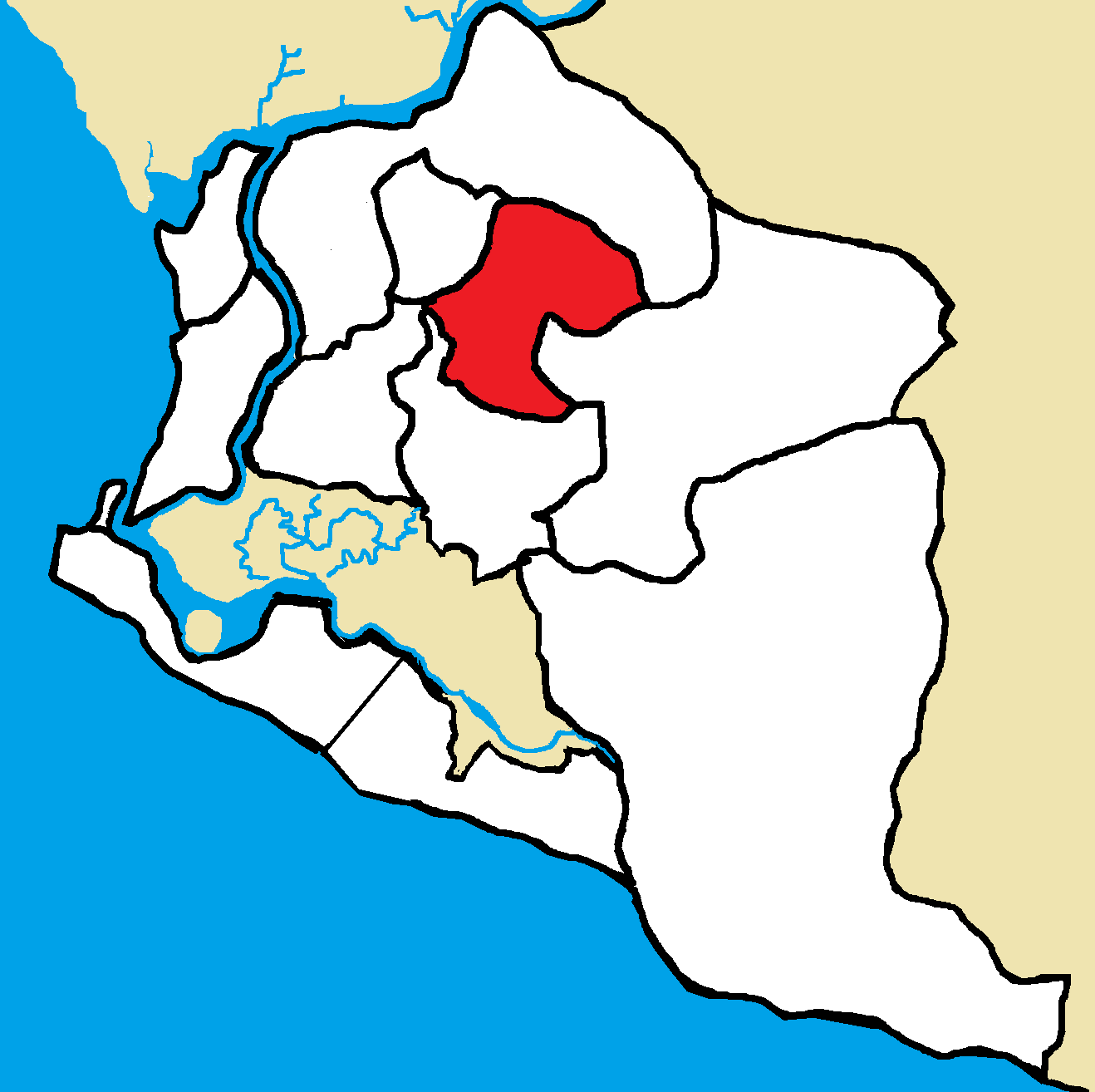
Location of Gardnesville within the Greater Monrovia District

During the Liberian Civil War, the area was war torn and thousands of refugees hid in buildings in Gardnersville and Chocolate City. On October 20, 1992, two American nuns from the Precious Blood order were ambushed by soldiers of the National Patriotic Front of Liberia and murdered and had their vehicle stolen. In 1993 the situation became so bad that the suburb became inaccessible.

In 2018 President George Weah appointed Rev. David Roberts as Commissioner for Gardnersville.
