= Paynesville, Liberia =

City in Montserrado County, Liberia

Paynesville Paynesward
- Location in Liberia
- Coordinates: 6°17′N 10°43′W
- Country: Liberia
- County: Montserrado County
- Settled: 19th century (as Americo-Liberian settlement)

Government
  - Type: City Corporation
  - Mayor: Pam Belcher-Taylor
- Elevation: 79 ft (24 m)

Population (2008)
  - Total: 317,693
- Most populous municipality in Liberia per 2008 census
- Time zone: UTC+00:00 (GMT)
- Website: www.pcc.gov.lr

Paynesville (sometimes Paynesward) is a city in Montserrado County, Liberia, and part of the Greater Monrovia area. It lies directly east of Monrovia, along the main route to Roberts International Airport. Paynesville is a major commercial hub, home to the large Red Light Market, and hosts significant national landmarks such as the Samuel Kanyon Doe Sports Complex.

== History ==
Paynesville developed as a settlement outside Monrovia and gradually grew into one of Liberia's largest urban municipalities. Its name is believed to derive from settlers of Americo-Liberian origin. During the Liberian Civil Wars (1989–2003), Paynesville hosted large numbers of displaced people and became a key battleground in the conflict.

The city was also home to the Paynesville Omega Transmitter, once the tallest structure in Africa and used for long-range radio transmission, until its demolition in 2011.

== Geography and climate ==
Paynesville is situated immediately east of Monrovia at an elevation of about 24 metres above sea level. It serves as a gateway between Monrovia and Robertsfield. The city lies in a tropical monsoon climate zone, with heavy rainfall between May and October and a drier season from November to April.

== Demographics ==
According to the 2008 National Housing and Population Census, Paynesville had an estimated population of over 300,000, making it one of the most populous municipalities in Liberia. The population is ethnically diverse, with representation from most major Liberian groups. The dominant languages are Liberian English, Kpelle, Bassa, and Vai, and Christianity is the predominant religion.

== Government and administration ==
Paynesville is administered by the Paynesville City Corporation (PCC), led by a mayor appointed by the President of Liberia. Former mayors have included Cyvette Gibson (2012–2018) and Pam Belcher-Taylor (2018–present). In 2024, the PCC launched its first Five-Year Strategic Plan (2024–2029) to guide urban development, focusing on sanitation, infrastructure, governance, and sustainable growth.

== Economy ==
The city is best known for the Red Light Market, a sprawling commercial district where thousands of traders operate daily, supplying goods to Monrovia and beyond. Informal commerce, small-scale retail, and transport services dominate the local economy.

== Infrastructure and services ==
The Samuel Kanyon Doe Sports Complex is Liberia’s largest stadium and hosts national football matches and public events. A community park adjacent to Paynesville City Hall, featuring playgrounds, seating areas, and a basketball court, was officially opened in 2024 with construction support from the Government of the People's Republic of China.

Major roads such as the Robertsfield Highway and Somalia Drive pass through Paynesville, making it a transport hub between Monrovia and the rest of the country.

== Education ==
Paynesville hosts numerous primary and secondary schools, both public and private. In 2020, the humanitarian group My Sister’s Keeper donated a reading room to the Christ Foundation Community Elementary School to support literacy.

== Culture and sports ==
Sports are an important part of Paynesville’s community life. The football club Paynesville FC gained national attention after securing Liberia’s second slot in the CAF Confederation Cup in 2024 following victories over Cameroon’s Fovu Club de Baham.

Religious institutions and community organizations are active across the city, reflecting the city’s diverse cultural fabric.

== Notable people ==
- Ellen Johnson Sirleaf, former President of Liberia, has been associated with residences in Paynesville.
- George Weah, football legend and former President of Liberia, maintains a residence in Paynesville.
- Joseph Boakai, current President of Liberia maintains a residence in the rehab of Paynesville.

== See also ==
- Greater Monrovia
- Monrovia
