= All Liberia Coalition Party =

Political party in Liberia

The All Liberia Coalition Party (ALCOP) is a political party in Liberia. In the last elections held on 19 July 1997, the ALCOP presidential candidate Alhaji G.V. Kromah won 4.02% of the vote. The party won 3 of 64 seats in the House of Representatives and 2 of 26 in the Senate. While international observers deemed the polls administratively free and transparent, they noted that it had taken place in an atmosphere of intimidation because most voters believed that former rebel leader and National Patriotic Party (NPP) candidate Charles Taylor would return to war if defeated.

Kromah ran again as the party's presidential candidate in the 11 October 2005 elections. He won 2.8% of the vote. The party won one seat in the Senate and two in the House of Representatives. In 2020, Lusinee Kamara succeeded G. V. Kromah as the party leader.

In the 2023 general election the party under the leadership of Ansu V.S. Dulleh fielded Lusinee Kamara as presidential candidate, who finished fourth with 1.96% of the votes, but failed to win any seat in both the House of Representatives and the Senate.
