= Greater Monrovia District =

Districts located in Montserrado County, Liberia

Coordinates: 6°18′38″N 10°48′17″W

Greater Monrovia is one of four districts located in Montserrado County, Liberia. It contains the country's capital Monrovia. It recorded a population of 970,824 in the 2008 census.

Greater Monrovia has no official administrative status. Unlike other districts of Liberia which are divided into clans, Greater Monrovia is divided into zones. The Monrovia City Corporation (MCC) is responsible for the administration of the city of Monrovia. Greater Monrovia also contains several semi-autonomous townships (Congo Town, New Georgia, Gardnersville, Dixville, Barnesville, Caldwell, Johnsonville and Garworlon) and the only borough in Liberia, New Kru Town. The MCC provides services to the townships and borough through a revenue-sharing arrangement, but has no zoning or enforcement jurisdiction in them.

== See also ==
- Communities of the Greater Monrovia District
