= Liberia Transformation Party =

Political party in Liberia

- Abbreviation: LTP
- Leader: Kennedy G. Sandy
- Founder: Kennedy G. Sandy

The Liberia Transformation Party (LTP) is a political party in Liberia.

== History ==
The LTP was founded by Kennedy G. Sandy. Sandy has served as a pastor and bishop. He served as the party's nominee when it contested the 2011 presidential election. Alloycious Dennis Wolloh served as his running mate. He received 13,612 votes, 1.1% of the total. Sandy also opposed the 2011 constitutional referendum. In the subsequent runoff election, the LTP joined the Congress for Democratic Change, along with several other opposition parties, in withdrawing from the electoral process, alleging fraud. In 2011, the LTP won no seats in the Senate, but won one in the House of Representatives. Emerson V. Kamara was elected to represent Grand Cape Mount's 3rd House district.

The party won no seats in the 2014 Senate election.

Sandy ran again with the LTP in the 2017 presidential election. His running mate was Victoria Morris Tweh. Sandy attempted to withdraw from the election in 2017, due to his involvement with the Constitution Review Committee, however the National Elections Commission did not permit him to so late in the election, due to a section of the Election Law. He received 5,343 votes, 0.3% of the total. Rep. Kamara was re-elected with the Coalition for Democratic Change instead of the LTP. Rep. Samuel G. Karmo (Bomi-1), who was elected with the Unity Party in 2011, ran with the LTP in 2017, though he was not re-elected. Rustonlyn S. Dennis was elected in Montserrado's 4th House district.

The party won no seats in the 2020 Senate election.

The LTP did not contest the 2023 presidential election. Rep. Dennis unsuccessfully contested re-election as an independent. The LTP again won no seats in the Senate.
