= George Harley =

George Harley may refer to:

- George Harley (physician) (1829–1896), Scottish physician
- George Davies Harley (1762–1811), English actor and poet
- George Harley (painter) (1791–1871), English watercolourist
- George Way Harley (1894–1966), American Methodist missionary in Liberia
