= ELWA Hospital =

Eternal Love Winning Africa Hospital

Geography
- Location: Paynesville District, Monrovia, Liberia
- Coordinates: 6.2409°N 10.6958°W

History
- Founded: 1965

Links
- Other links: List of hospitals in Liberia

Eternal Love Winning Africa Hospital is a hospital in Liberia located in the capital city Monrovia. It holds 120 beds and is operated by SIM. It was established in 1965 This hospital continued its operations during the Ebola epidemic and civil wars.

== See also ==
- List of hospitals in Liberia
- 2014 Ebola virus epidemic in Liberia
