= Redemption Hospital =

Geography
- Location: Monrovia District, Monrovia, Liberia
- Coordinates: 6°22′11.8″N 10°47′30.8″W

Services
- Beds: 200

Links
- Other links: List of hospitals in Liberia

Redemption Hospital is a 200-bed hospital operated by the government in Liberia's capital city, Monrovia. This hospital had stopped its operations during the hard times of the Ebola epidemic and civil wars of 1990s. The hospital, renamed "New Redemption Hospital", is set to be one of the larger hospitals in Monrovia. It is currently under construction in the suburb of Caldwell. Construction is being carried out by the Liberian government and architecture company Mass Design Group based in Boston with an office in Kigali.

== See also ==
- List of hospitals in Liberia
- 2014 Ebola virus epidemic in Liberia
