= John F. Kennedy Medical Center (Liberia) =

Geography
- Location: Monrovia, Liberia
- Coordinates: 6.2866°N 10.7736°W

Services
- Emergency department: Yes

History
- Founded: 1971

Links
- Website: www.jfkmc.gov.lr
- Other links: List of hospitals in Liberia

John F. Kennedy Medical Center is the national medical center of Liberia, located in the Sinkor district of Monrovia.

== History ==
The JFK Medical Center was built at the request of Liberian President William V.S. Tubman, whose 1961 visit with U.S. President John F. Kennedy laid the groundwork for USAID funding for a national medical center in Liberia. The project was funded with a $6.8 million loan and $9.2 million in grants from USAID and a $1 million contribution from the Liberian Government. Construction began in 1965 and the facility opened on July 27, 1971.

When dedicated, the Medical Center was composed of four institutions:

- John F. Kennedy Memorial Hospital
- Maternity Hospital
- Tubman National Institute of Medical Arts (a paramedical and nursing school)
- Catherine Mills Rehabilitation Hospital (a psychiatric care facility)

The maternity hospital was rebuilt in 1981 with funding from the Japanese government and named the Liberian-Japanese Friendship Maternity Hospital.

The Catherine Mills Rehabilitation Hospital was completely destroyed during the Liberian civil conflict. JFK now is affiliated with the E.S. Grant Mental Health Hospital, located in Paynesville, Monrovia.

== Liberian Civil War ==
The facility sustained heavy damage over the 23-year period of civil unrest that began with the 1980 coup led by Samuel Doe and lasted until 2003. The main hospital, which at five stories is one of the tallest structures in the vicinity, was at one point occupied by rebel forces and used as a machine gun outpost overlooking Tubman Boulevard, a major road linking the Sinkor neighborhood with downtown Monrovia. The hospital was also used at one time by the Red Cross and Médecins Sans Frontières as a field hospital for the war wounded.

== Renovations ==
Scottish philanthropist Ann Gloag funded a partial renovation of the hospital wards in the main hospital, which was completed in 2009.

== General administrators ==
The General Administrator is in charge of all the component organizations that make up the Medical Center and is appointed by the President of Liberia. Former General Administrators include:

- Dr. Moses Kronyanh Weefur: 1971–1980
- Dr. Wvannie Mae Scott-McDonald: 2007–2017
- Dr. Jerry F. Brown: 2018–present

== See also ==
- List of hospitals in Liberia
- 2014 Ebola virus epidemic in Liberia
