= Francis Kateh =

Liberian physician and an academic (born 1965)

Francis N. Kateh (born 12 July 1965 in Karlokeh, Maryland County) is a Liberian physician and an academic.

Kateh began his doctoral training in medicine when he volunteered at the Ganta United Methodist Hospital. Thereafter, he got a scholarship at the University of Liberia and subsequently to the United States where he attended MacMurray College in Jacksonville, Illinois. Although sponsored by the then Central Illinois Conference of the United Methodist Church, Kateh matriculated to Spartan University School of Medicine, Vieux Fort, St. Lucia where he obtained a degree in medicine. Graduates of the Spartan University School of Medicine are ineligible for licensure in several U.S. states, and Great Britain. Kateh returned to Liberia during the First Liberian Civil War.

After serving in Liberia for the United Methodist Church for over six years, he returned to the United States. Kateh earned a Master of Health Administration degree from Governors State University, University Park, IL. Being touched by the devastation in New Orleans, due to Katrina, Kateh decided to pursue a degree in Homeland Security with emphasis in Public Health Disaster Preparedness. On May 10, 2008, Dr. Kateh earned a Master of Professional Studies in Homeland Security Leadership with emphasis in Public Health Disaster Preparedness. He is married and has four children.

== Career history ==
- Adjunct Professor, Health Care Law & ethics and International Health Care Issues and Policies, Pfeiffer University, Graduate Program in Health Administration, Charlotte, NC
- Public Health Director, Anson County, North Carolina- 2004–present
- Former Surgical Assistant- Sacred Heart Hospital, Chicago, IL-
- Former Adjunct Instructor, Anatomy and Physiology, Prairie State College, Chicago Heights, IL-
- Former Chief Medical Officer/Medical Director of Ganta United Methodist Hospital, Liberia-
- Former Head of Surgery, Ganta United Methodist Hospital, Liberia-

== Professional affiliation ==
- Member- North Carolina Association of Local Health Directors
- Regional Representative- Region VI (North Carolina Association of Local Health Directors)
- Member- American Public Health Association
- Member- American College of Health Executives
- Chairperson, Exercise and Evaluation Committee, National Association of County and City Health Officials (NACCHO)-
- Member Public Health Preparedness Essential Services Committee (NACCHO)-
- Peer Reviewer- Disaster Preparedness and Evaluation-
- Member, Board of Trustees - MacMurray College, Jacksonville, IL (2005–2007)

== Awards ==
- 2006 Community Leadership Award- Spencer Memorial UMC- Charlotte, NC
- Distinguished Young Alumni Award- MacMurray College- 2001
- Distinguished Alumni for the Millennium- MacMurray College- 2000
