= St. Joseph's Catholic Hospital =

- Brothers of St. John of God, Province of Africa

Geography
- Location: Monrovia District, Monrovia, Liberia
- Coordinates: 6.35000°N 10.46667°W

Organisation
- Funding: Catholic hospital
- Type: Healthcare
- Affiliated university: Catholic Mission

Services
- Beds: 141

History
- Opened: 1963

Links
- Website: www.sjcatholichospital.com
- Other links: List of hospitals in Liberia

St. Joseph's Catholic Hospital is a Christian-run hospital which was established in 1963. It serves everyone around the community in Liberia. The hospital does not charge for providing services to its clients. It is a not for profit institution.

== History ==
Founded in the 1960s, St. Joseph's was forced to close in 2014 by the Ebola epidemic in Liberia.

== See also ==
- List of hospitals in Liberia
