= Squatting in Liberia =

Liberia on globe

Squatting in Liberia is one of three ways to access land, the other two being ownership by deed or customary ownership. The informal settlement of West Point was founded in the capital Monrovia in the 1950s and is estimated to house between 29,500 and 75,000 people. During the First Liberian Civil War (1989–1997) and the Second Liberian Civil War (1999–2003), many people in Liberia were displaced, and some ended up squatting in Monrovia. The Ducor Hotel fell into disrepair and was squatted, before being evicted in 2007. In the early 2020s, over 9,000 Burkinabés were squatting on remote land, and the Liberia Land Authority (LLA) announced a plan to title all land in the country.

== Overview ==
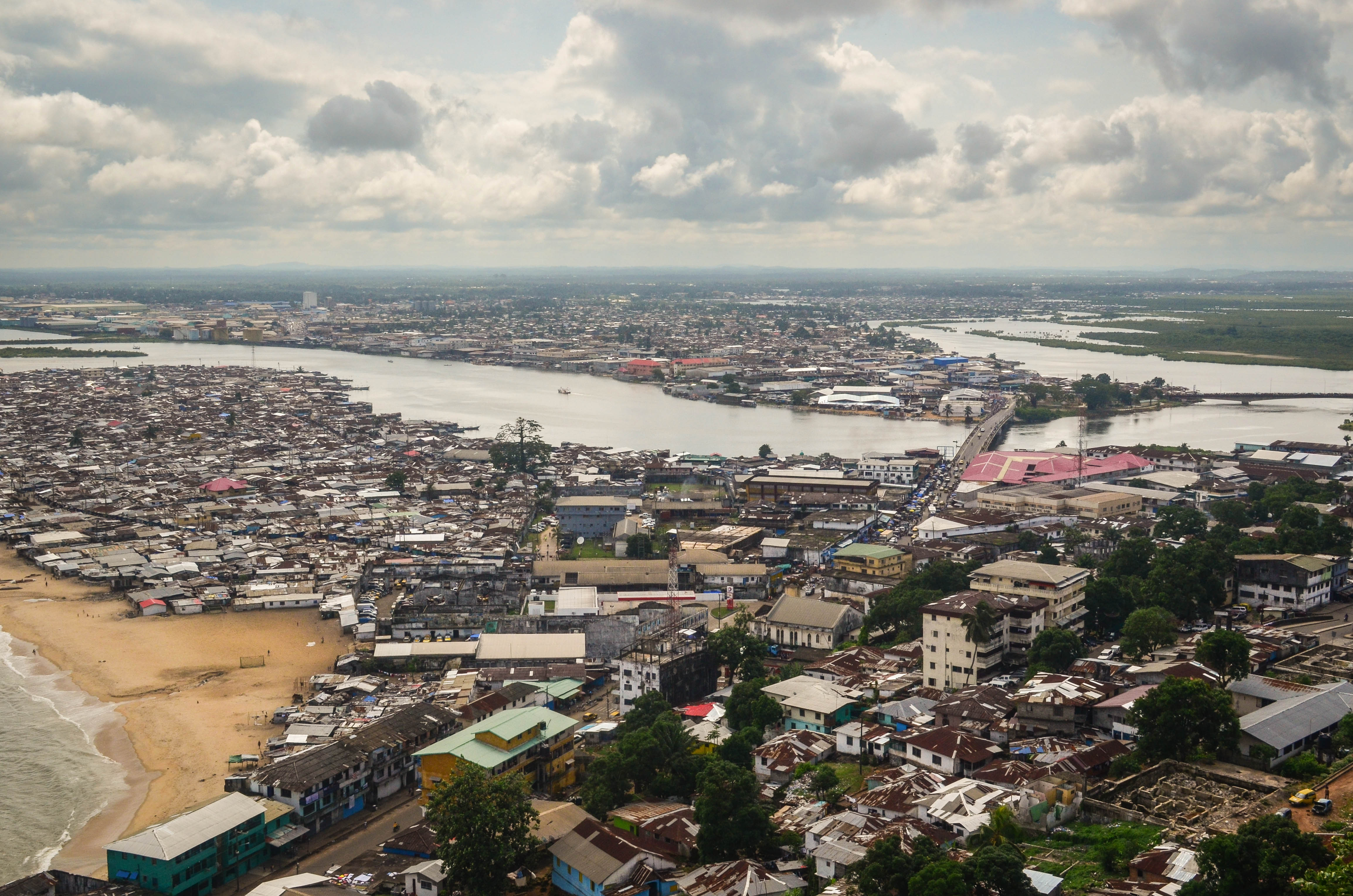
The West Point informal settlement in 2013, on the left side of the picture. Clara Town is across the bridge.

Access to land in Liberia is achieved through squatting, ownership by deed or customary ownership (which does not use deeds). From the 1950s onwards there have been squatted informal settlements in the capital Monrovia. West Point was founded in the 1950s and is estimated to house between 29,500 and 75,000 people. Many squats are beside the sea; in 2013, 200 homes in New Kru Town were washed away by a high tide.

== Civil wars ==
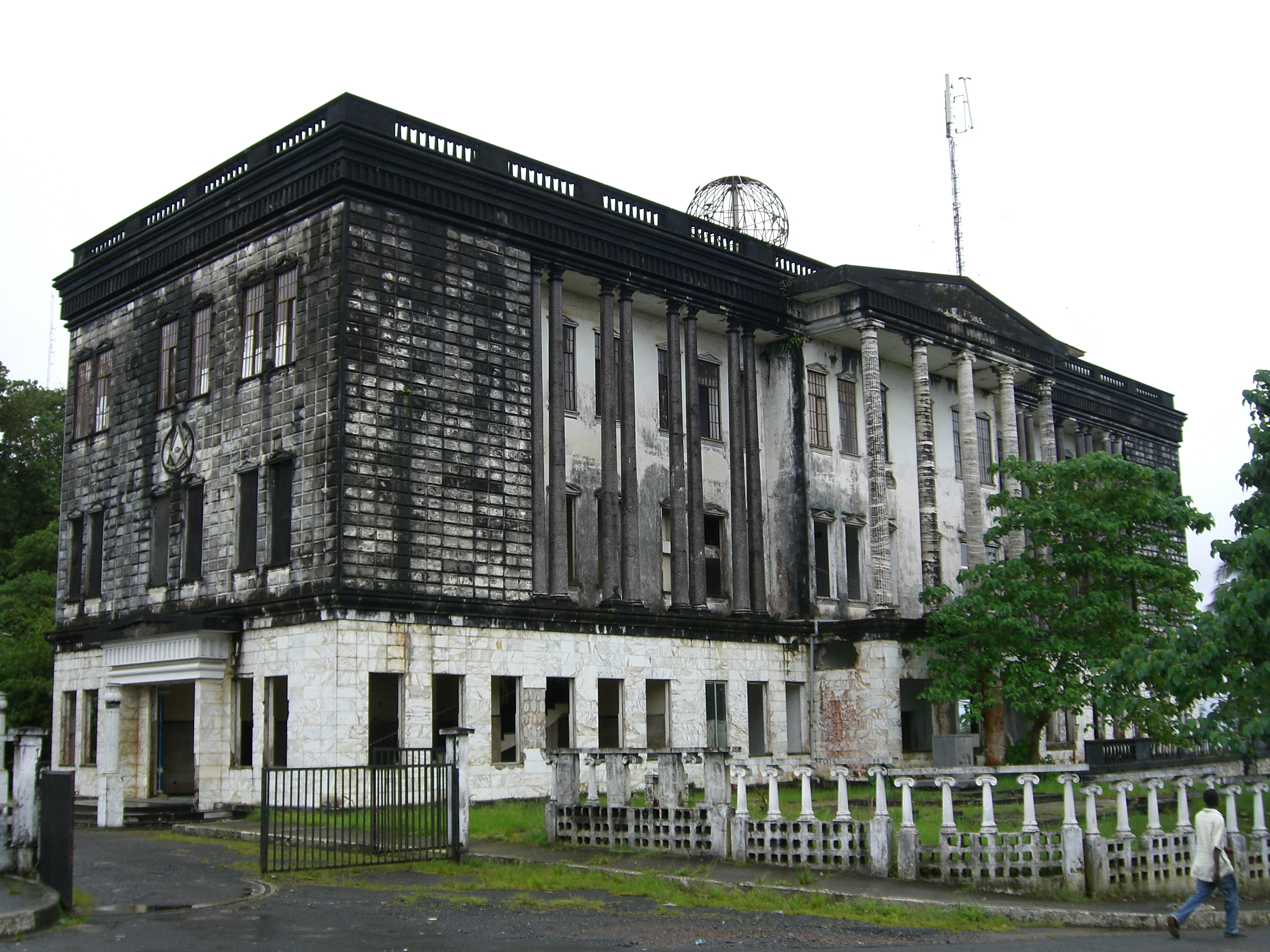
The Grand Masonic Temple of the Masonic Order of Liberia in 2006

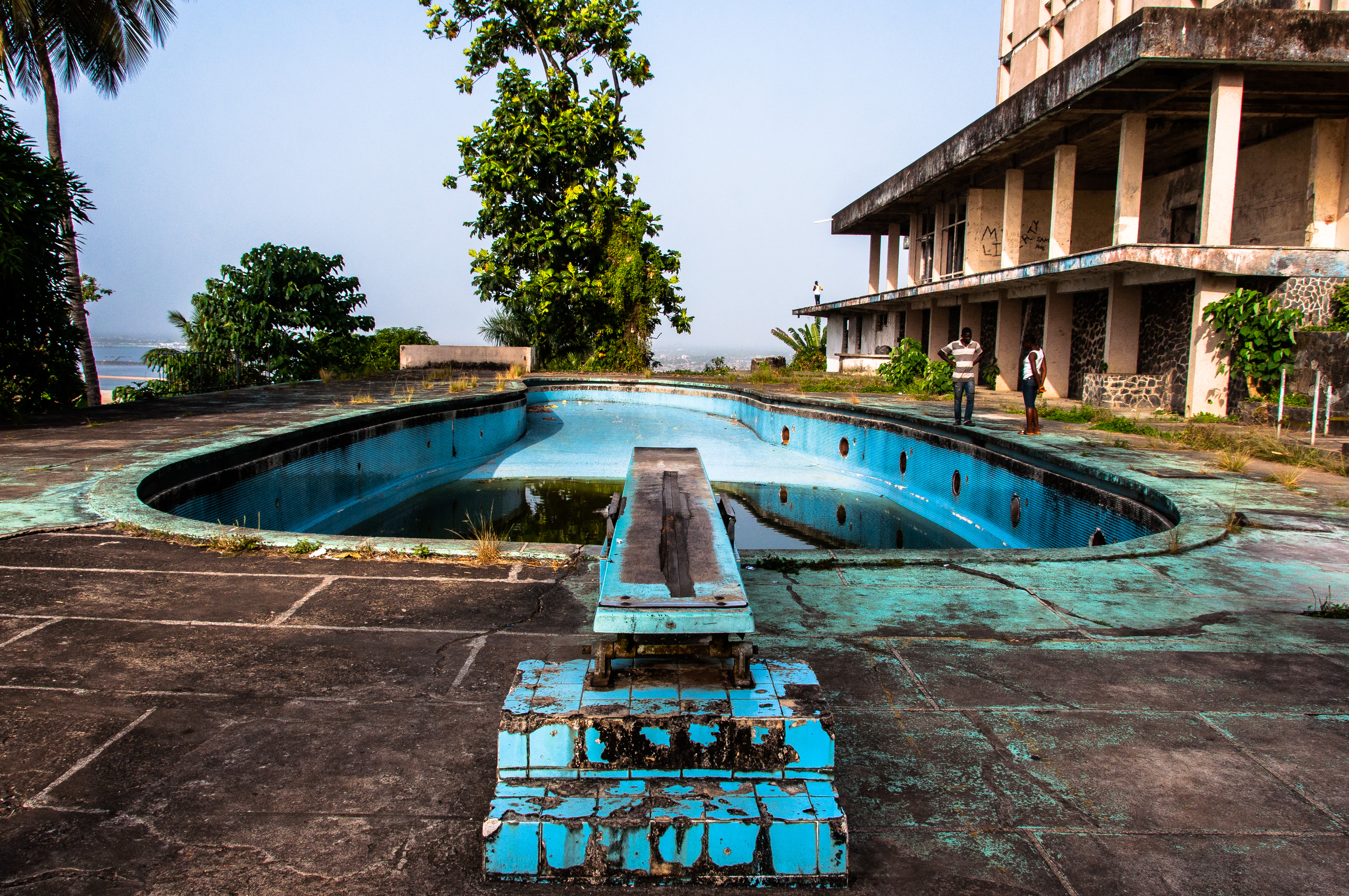
Derelict swimming pool at the Ducor Hotel

During the First Liberian Civil War (1989–1997) and the Second Liberian Civil War (1999–2003), many people in Liberia were displaced, and some ended up squatting in Monrovia. The government charged the squatters a US$20 annual fee, allegedly based on the 1957 Zoning Code; although this gave no actual legal rights to land, it did mark de facto tenure. The Grand Masonic Temple of the Masonic Order of Liberia was occupied by 8,000 squatters, and the derelict Ducor Hotel was also occupied, the inhabitants being evicted in 2007. As of 2014, there were 27 squatted areas in Monrovia.

The ruined former palace of politician William Tubman in the town of Harper was also squatted. In the nation's second city Ganta, Gio and Mano ex-soldiers squatted following the end of conflict. They were Christian and supported Charles Taylor's faction, whereas the houses they squatted were owned by Mandinka people who were Muslim and who fought for the Liberians United for Reconciliation and Democracy (LURD), so these differences created tensions over land ownership. From 2003 onwards, the local council has given squatters rights to people occupying privately owned land, and the mayor herself was squatting. The mayor was forced to relinquish her own squat in 2008 and cancel the permissions, yet this has not led to evictions. Around 2,000 former LURD soldiers occupied a plantation located between Monrovia and the border with Sierra Leone. As of 2005, they were refusing to leave the site until the United Nations offered them retraining, and they were supporting themselves financially by illegally tapping rubber.

== 2020s ==
The Daily Observer reported in 2020 that over 9,000 Burkinabés were squatting on remote land in Grand Gedeh County. In January 2021, the Liberia Land Authority announced it would be digitally titling all land in the country. The Minister of Finance, Samuel D. Tweah, said, "We should stop calling people squatters; let those squatters confer titles on squatters and let's move on. There are too many lands here in this country; government gets plenty land". In lower Margibi County, the residents of the 70-year-old informal settlement Unification Town received titles to their land in late 2020.
