= List of hospitals in Liberia =

This is an incomplete list of hospitals in Liberia

== Monrovia ==
- AMI Expeditionary Healthcare Hospital
- John F. Kennedy Medical Center
- Jahmale Medical Solutions
- Eternal Love Winning Africa Hospital
- Redemption Hospital
- St. Joseph's Catholic Hospital
- Cooper Adventist Hospital
- MSF Pediatric Hospital
- E. S. Grant Mental Health Hospital
- A.M.E. University Clinic
- Hope For Women International Health Center
- James N.Davis Jr. Memorial Hospital (Paynesville)
- Benson Hospital (Paynesville)
- Bensonville Hospital
- Snapper Hill Clinic
- Peace Clinic(Old Road _Louisiana)

== Elsewhere ==
=== Grand Gedeh County ===
- Martha Tubman Memorial Hospital, Zwedru, Grand Gedeh County
- Ziah Town Hospital, Ziah Town, Grand Gedeh County

=== Lofa County ===
- Curran Hospital, Zorzor, Lofa County
- Telewonyan Hospital, Voinjama, Lofa County
- Kolahun hospital, Kolahun, Lofa County
- Borma hospital, Foya, Lofa County

=== Grand Cape Mount County ===
- St. Timothy Memorial Hospital, Robertsport, Grand Cape Mount County

=== Bomi County ===
- Liberia Government Hospital, Tubmanburg, Bomi County

=== Gbarpolu County ===
- Chief Jallalone Memorial Hospital, Bopulu, Gbarpolu County
- Emirates Hospital – Liberia, Bopolu, Gbarpolu County

=== Grand Bassa County ===
- Liberia Government Hospital, Buchanan, Grand Bassa County
- Liberia Agricultural Company (LAC) Hospital, LAC, Grand Bassa County
- Mittal Steel Hospital, Buchanan, Grand Bassa County
- Gbokpasom Medical Center, Robert Street, Buchanan, Grand Bassa County Liberia

=== Rivercess County ===
- St. Francis Hospital, Cestos city, Rivercess County

=== Margibi County ===
- Firestone Health Services, comprising Firestone Medical Center (FMC) situated in Duside, Harbel Health Center (HHC), Farmington Health Center (FHC) and Div. #35 Clinic], Margibi County
- C.H. Rennie Hospital, Kakata, Margibi County
- 14 Military Hospital, EBK Barracks, Margibi County

=== Bong County ===
- GW Health Group, Bong County
- Phebe Hospital, Bong County
- Bong Mines Hospital, Bong County
- C.B.Dunbar Memorial Hospital, Gbarnga, Bong County
- Salala Hospital, Salala, Bong County

=== Nimba County ===
- George Way Harley Memorial Hospital, Sanniquellie, Nimba County
- Jackson F. Doe Memorial Regional Referral Hospital, Tappita, Nimba County.
- Ganta United Methodist Hospital, Ganta, County
- G.W. Harley Memorial Hospital, Saniquelleh, Nimba County
- Zoe Geh Medical Center, Nimba County
- Saclepea Comprehensive Health Center, Saclepea, Nimba
- E&J Hospital

Ganta

=== Grand Kru County ===
- Rally Time Hospital, Grandcess, Grand Kru County
- Domo Nimene Maternity Hospital, Sasstown, Grand Kru County

=== Sinoe County ===
- GW Health Group, Sinoe County
- F.J. Grant Memorial Hospital, Greenville, Sinoe County

=== Maryland County ===
- J.J. Dossen Hospital, Harper, Maryland County
- Cavalla Medical Center, Cavalla, Maryland County
- Pleebo Health Center, Pleebo, Maryland County

== See also ==
- Health in Liberia
