= Ebola misinformation =

Misinformation about Ebola viruses

Multiple conspiracy theories, hoaxes, and quack cures have circulated about ebola viruses, regarding the origin of outbreaks, treatments for ebola virus disease, and preventative measures.

== Unproven and disproven treatments ==
During the Western African Ebola virus epidemic (2013–2016), a number of unproven and fake treatments were marketed online in the United States, including snake venom, vitamin C, "Nano Silver", and various homeopathic and herbal remedies, including clove oil, garlic, and ewedu soup. Gary Coody, national health fraud coordinator for the FDA, described the purveyors of these unproven treatments as "like storm-chasing roofers, who go and try to defraud people after a big storm. Some of them may be making an honest mistake; other companies are trying to rip people off." Coody also said the problem with implausible and unproven remedies is not only that they are unlikely to work, but also that such treatments may lead to patients delaying effective and timely medical care in a hospital setting.

== Implausible and disproven methods for preventing Ebola ==
During the 2014 and 2019 outbreaks, a number of hoax remedies for the prevention of Ebola were spread online. One such common thread was the frequent use of essential oils. There is no evidence that any of these treatments will decrease the risk of Ebola virus infection, and no known plausible mechanisms for such an effect.

== Virus origins ==
During the 2014 outbreak in Liberia, an article in the Liberian Observer alleged that the virus was a bioweapon designed by the US military as a form of population control. Other theories spreading online during the pandemic alleged that the New World Order had engineered the virus to impose quarantines and travel bans to soften an eventual descent into martial law. During a 2019 outbreak in the Democratic Republic of the Congo, rumors spread that the virus was imported to the country for financial gain, or as part of a plot to procure organs for the black market.
