= Health in Liberia =

Life expectancy in Liberia

Liberia is one of the poorest countries in the world. Civil wars have killed around 250,000 people and displaced many more. The wars ended in 2003 but destroyed most of the country's healthcare facilities. Recovery precedes proceeds, but the majority of the population still lives below the international poverty line. Life expectancy in Liberia is much lower than the world average. Communicable diseases are widespread, including tuberculosis, diarrhea, malaria, HIV, and Dengue. Female genital mutilation is widely practiced. Nearly a quarter of children under the age of five are malnourished and few people have access to adequate sanitation facilities. In 2009, government expenditure on health care per-capita was US$22, accounting for 10.6% of totaled GDP. In 2008, Liberia had only one doctor and 27 nurses per 100,000 people. It was ill-equipped to handle the outbreak of Ebola in 2014 and 2015.

== Health infrastructure ==
Liberia has 5,000 full-time or part-time health workers and 51 Liberian doctors to cater to a population of 3.8 million, according to the 2006 health survey. That's the equivalent of one doctor serving about 76,000 civilians. Most of the hospitals, clinics and equipment were destroyed as a result of the 14-year civil war from 1989 to 2003. Strengthening the health sector faces financial problems. The government used only 16.8% of the total health expenditure in the country.

Liberia is heavily dependent on the international community for health infrastructure and assistance. International aid organizations assist the government in rebuilding medical facilities and providing basic health care to its citizens. The World Health Organization (WHO) donated equipment and helped provide and assist in vaccinating people to prevent the spread of many infectious diseases.

The Global Alliance for Vaccines and Immunization (GAVI) is investing $160 million to improve Liberia's health care system and improve the quality of immunization services. The international medical humanitarian organization Médecins Sans Frontières (MSF) helped Liberia after the civil war (2003) by running free hospitals, treating more than 20,000 women and children each year.

== Health status ==
=== Ebola ===
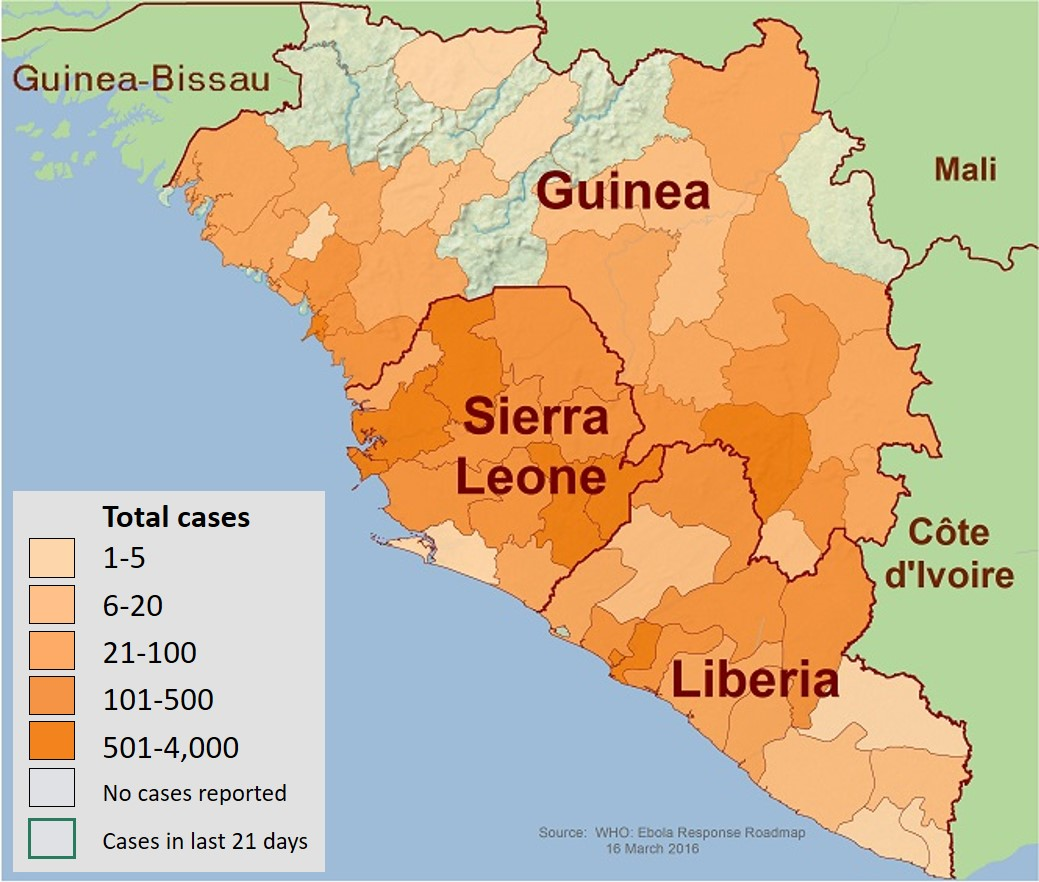
The presence of Ebola in Guinea, Liberia, and Sierra Leone as of 17 December 2014

Ebola virus is a highly contagious and deadly disease that affect the human lives. The disease can be transmitted from animals to humans and from humans-to-humans interactions.

Ebola was first reported in Lofa and Nimba counties in Liberia in late March as part of a wider regional Ebola outbreak in 2014. Not even a month later, six Ebola-related deaths had been recorded. As of September 23, 2014, 1,415 people had died from confirmed or probable Ebola in Liberia, with an additional 415 deaths that were suspected cases. Among the deaths were 89 Liberian healthcare workers. The Ebola crisis in Liberia continued in 2015, only this time the disease has been narrowed to two of the counties of Bighorn Mountain and Montserrado. The Ebola ELWA-3 treatment centers that were opened in Liberia in August was very overwhelmed with patients affected by the disease that due to the limited capacity of the centre some patients were turned away. Several people died and tested positive in Liberia before the World Health Organization declared Liberia virus-free in September. However, in April 2016, the Ministry of Health reported that there was a fatality that tested positive for the Ebola virus; by April 4, 84 people were under observation after two confirmed cases in their region (Monrovia).

=== Malaria ===
In Liberia, malaria is the leading cause of outpatient visits and the number one cause of death in hospitalized patients. Hospital records suggest that at least 33 percent of inpatient deaths, and 41 percent of inpatient deaths among children under five years of age, are attributable to malaria. Plasmodium falciparum is the main source of infection, and malaria transmission occurs year-round in all geographic regions.

According to the 2016 Malaria Indicator Survey (MIS), 45 percent of children aged 6–59 months had a positive malaria rapid diagnostic tests, with regional variations ranging from 12 percent in Greater Monrovia to 69 percent in South-Eastern B; and 62 percent of households had at least one insecticide-treated net (ITN). National achievements from the 2009 MIS to the 2016 MIS included: increases in artemisinin combination therapy coverage in children under five years of age from 45 percent to 81 percent; intermittent preventive treatment for pregnant women's uptake from 45 percent to 55 percent; households with at least one ITN from 47 percent to 62 percent; and children under five years of age with fever who had a finger or heel stick from 23 percent to 50 percent.

The Liberian Ministry of Health's Joint Annual Health Sector Review Report of 2016 indicated that malaria services were mostly available and provided by 97 percent of the health facilities across the country.

=== Mental health ===
As a result of 14 years of intense civil conflict, a significant portion of the population suffers from mental illness or is mentally or physically traumatized. A 2008 study by the American Medical Association (AMA) showed that a staggering 40 percent of adults exhibit symptoms of major depressive disorder. 44% of adults also had symptoms of PTSD or post-traumatic stress disorder.

E. S. Grant Mental Health Hospital is the only inpatient psychiatric facility in Liberia.

=== HIV/AIDS ===
Liberia is committed to UNAIDS 95-95-95 Epidemic Management Goals, with key priorities identified in National ART Guidelines, HIV Testing Guidelines and National Strategic Plan (2021–2025). HIV co-epidemic in Liberia, estimated 2018 HIV prevalence of 1.3% (spectrum) and 39,484 HIV-positive people (PLHIV). On World AIDS Day, December 1, the United States' President's Emergency Plan for AIDS Relief (PEPFAR) anticipates a future in which HIV is a manageable chronic illness with few new infections. Liberia is well on its way to achieving this goal. Getting rid of stigmatization amongst Liberians living with HIV and others at risk, is a potential step to help prolong lives. Stigma hinders HIV prevention efforts in a number of ways. The key to preventing HIV transmission is frequent testing and safe sex behaviors, as we've learned from decades of combating the illness. People are hesitant to be tested because they are afraid of stigmatization—discrimination and other negative social implications of a positive result. If they get a positive result, they are more likely to skip medical appointments and not fully comply with their treatment plan, increasing the risk of spreading the disease to others. In Liberia, we still have a long way to go in reducing HIV stigma and its harmful effects. Irrational fear has led to attacks on HIV testing sites in recent years. People living with HIV are often targeted for violence because of their sexual orientation. The men claimed to be afraid to report the incident to the police. Stigmatization compels such groups to remain hidden, making them harder to approach and, as a result, preventing HIV-positive members of these communities from receiving adequate treatment. Roughly 1.3 percent of Liberia's population is HIV positive, implying that the country's HIV population is around 40,000 persons. Only 68 percent of these people are aware of their positive status, and even fewer are receiving ongoing treatment. According to these figures, over a third of HIV-positive Liberians, or 12,800 people, do not know that they are infected and may not be taking the necessary precautions to prevent the illness from spreading, such as participating in safe sex or seeking treatment. If we work together to eliminate stigma, we can reverse this trend. PEPFAR collaborates with the Liberian government, civil society, the Global Fund, United Nations agencies, and others to guarantee that persons living with HIV receive the high-quality care they need to prevent the spread of the virus. PEPFAR helps health-care institutions in Montserrado, Grand Bassa, Margibi, and Maryland, with an emphasis on high-risk populations. PEPFAR expects to support 15,000 clients in treatment this year, accounting for about 75% of all HIV patients in the nation. The HIV prevention program in Liberia has achieved great progress. As World AIDS Day approaches, the United States reaffirms its commitment to continue making significant progress. Stop stigmatizing people. Allow at-risk groups to seek treatment without fear of retaliation. Liberia's HIV/AIDS response.

=== Malnutrition and starvation ===
Liberia has one of the world's highest levels of poverty amongst its citizen and because of this reason, comes many health complications. Liberia is one of the world's 21 countries with the greatest malnutrition rates. Because of a lack of sufficient nutrition, one out of every three children under the age of five is stunted or too short for their age. Malnourished children are also more likely to die from diarrhea, pneumonia, and malaria. Malnutrition is responsible for 45 percent of mortality among children under the age of five, according to the World Health Organization. The national human development organization has said that 75% of Liberia's people live of less than a dollar a day. Malnutrition is widespread: 40% of children have unnatural stunted growth and 7% of Liberia's population have highly acute malnutrition. Because of insufficient food and teenage pregnancy are the reasons for the spike in starvation and malnutrition in Liberia. Teenage mothers are often single, sometimes because of rape. Unemployment, food supply, diseases, education, water, immunization, literacy rate are all contributing factors to the poverty rate, which affects a person's overall health. Moreover, the civil war also plays a major role in the level of malnutrition in Liberia. UNICEF and non-governmental organizations, or NGOs, are working with the Ministry of Health, Liberia Ministry of Health to increase the awareness malnutrition and make it a top priority of the country. Providing nutrition services is a major priority for the government, and it forms an important part of the National Health Policy. In 2008, the health ministry developed a nutrition policy, which became a good start from the service's promise. With this new policy, the health ministry aims to reduce the 39% chronic malnutrition rate by one-third by 2011, and fix one of the greatest issues of Liberia.

=== Water and sanitation ===
After the thirteen year long civil war, populations in the slums of Liberia skyrocketed. Infection, sickness, and death may be reduced if people had access to clean water. Due to the lack of proper toilets and sanitation in rural areas, about 42% of people have to defecate in the open. Additionally, a lack of adequate sanitation can lead to the spread of infection and lead to students missing school. On the other hand, the Government of Liberia is trying to improve these situations through a WASH initiative that will promote access to clean drinking water, sanitation and hygiene practices. Following the Ebola epidemic in 2014, there was an urgent need for WASH services in schools to avoid sickness. Between 2015 and 2016, 55 percent of Liberia's 4,460 schools lacked a functioning water supply, 43 percent lacked sanitization facilities, and only 18 percent lacked permanent handwashing facilities. The WASH program impacted about 50,763 persons in Liberia's five rural counties with limited access to water. As part of the initiative, two pit latrines were erected in two clinics, three wells were constructed in one clinic, and six wells were retrofitted in six communities.

=== Female genital mutilation ===
In Liberia, it is believed that half of all females have been subjected to female genital mutilation, a culturally established practice. It is seen as a necessary step before marriage in order to ensure a girl's virginity. It produces a slew of health issues and is at times deadly. According to Reuters, Liberia's parliament eliminated a restriction on female genital mutilation from a new domestic violence statute on July 28, 2016. When it was originally presented to lawmakers in September 2015, the law described it as a criminal violation. The FGM clause was withdrawn from the draft in April because to opposition from many legislators.

=== Abortion ===
Abortion in Liberia is illegal in many circumstances. Under section 16.3 of the Penal Law, abortion is illegal after the 24th week of pregnancy, and it is only legal in the cases of rape, fetal impairment, or if a physician has determined that the pregnancy would be a risk to the woman's mental or physical health. The law requires that an abortion be sanctioned in writing by two physicians. Illegal abortions are punishable by up to three years of prison.

A June 2013 study funded by the Clinton Health Access Initiative surveyed 3,219 Liberian women aged 15 to 49 and found that 32 percent had had an abortion. According to the Guttmacher Institute, Liberia has 242,000 abortions annually, of which 119,000 are unintended and 47,600 result in abortion.

On 13 June 2022, a joint committee of the Senate of Liberia began debating a bill to lift the ban on abortion. The bill was initiated by Senator Augustine Chea of Sinoe County, chair of the Senate Health Committee. As of November 2022, the outcome of the debate remains uncertain.

== See also ==
- List of hospitals in Liberia
- Ministry of Health and Social Welfare, Liberia
- COVID-19 pandemic in Liberia
