= Clara Town =

Slum on Bushrod Island in Monrovia, Liberia

Coordinates: 6°20′N 10°48′W

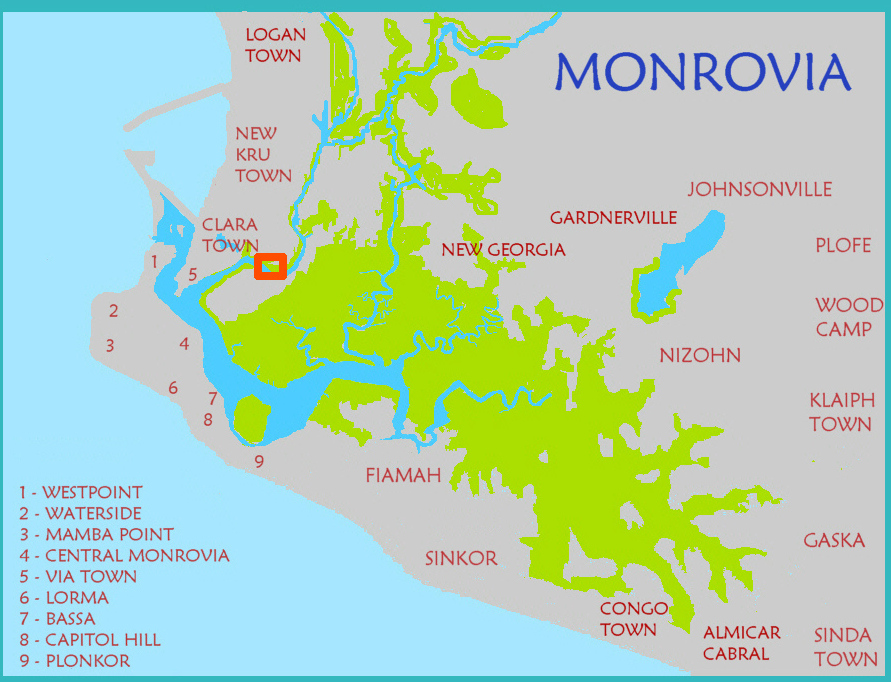
Clara Town located on a map of greater Monrovia.

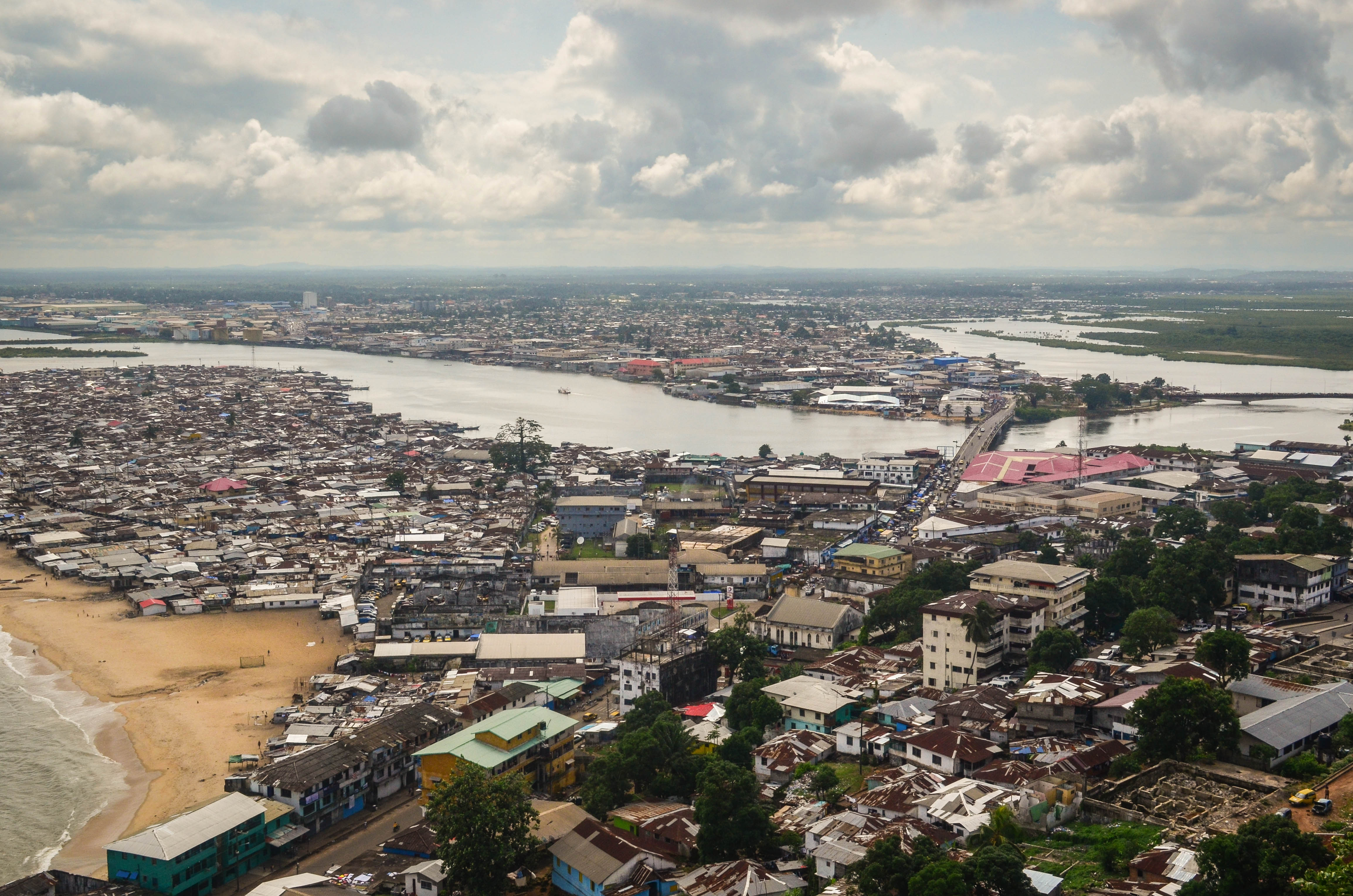
Clara Town is across the bridge on Bushrod Island. To the left of the photo is the slum of West Point.

Clara Town is a slum located on Bushrod Island in Monrovia, the capital of Liberia. It is built upon a swamp. Clara Town was one of several ethnic communes that was squatted in the outskirts of Monrovia. Clara Town had around 4,500 inhabitants in 1964 out of whom 99% were Kru.

An area within Clara Town is named "Struggle Community". According to The New Humanitarian this zone is "a network of haphazard, rubbish-strewn streets, many of which are flooded for several months of the year". In this area, 10,000 residents share two privately owned water taps. Clara Town's 75,000 people shared 11 public toilets and 22 public taps in 2009.

== Notable people ==
- George Weah, former soccer player and president of Liberia.
