= West Point, Monrovia =

Coordinates: 6.3273°N 10.8064°W

West Point
- Township
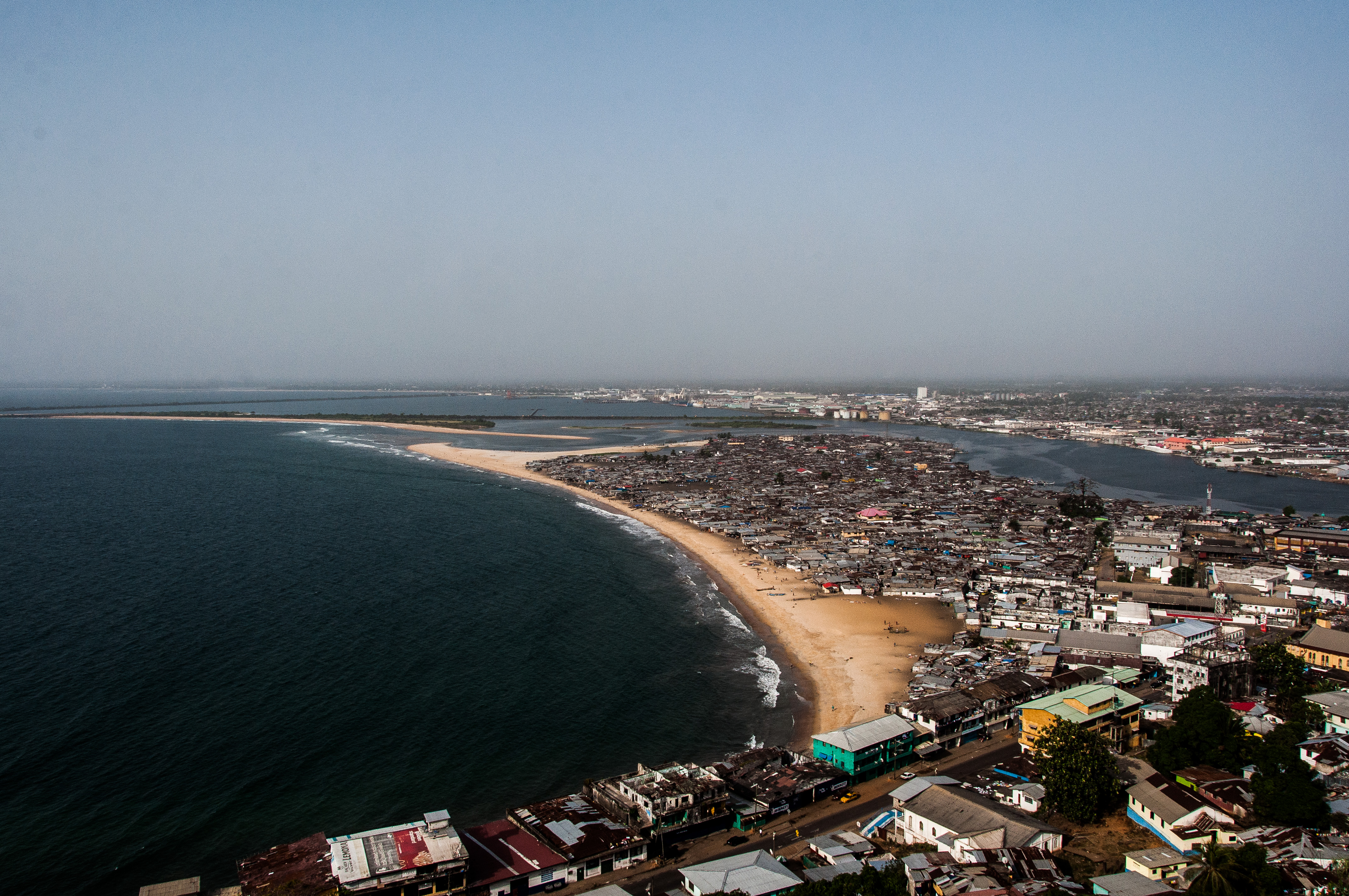
- Interactive map of West Point
- Country: Liberia
- County: Montserrado
- District: Greater Monrovia

Government
  - Commissioner: William C. Wea

Area
  - Total: 0.53 km^{2} (0.20 sq mi)

Population (2014)
  - Total: 34,605
  - Density: 65,000/km^{2} (170,000/sq mi)

West Point is a township of the Liberian capital city of Monrovia, located on a 0.53 km^{2} peninsula which juts out into the Atlantic Ocean between the Mesurado and Saint Paul rivers. West Point is one of Monrovia's most densely populated slums.

Environmental degradation has gradually caused part of the peninsula to erode into the ocean. Endemic problems include overpopulation and diseases such as tuberculosis.

== History ==
The informal settlement was squatted in the 1940s or 1950s by fishermen. An experiment in the 1970s to move people from West Point failed. Residents returned despite squalid living conditions. People moved back to fish and make a living as informal shopkeepers and service providers close to the city centre.

During the 2014 Ebola outbreak, it was placed under Cordon sanitaire for 18 days. This drew criticism from health experts and human rights advocates, and Liberia's president, Ellen Johnson Sirleaf, acknowledged it was a mistake.

== Government ==
In 2018 President George Weah appointed William C. Wea as Commissioner for West Point.

West Point is part of the Montserrado-7 electoral district.

== Demographics ==
West Point (or Zone Z400) is divided into six communities:

Community	Inhabitants (2014 est.)	No. of Households (2014 est.)
Central West Point	7,959	1,941
Fish Town	6,094	1,486
Grandcess Yard	7,341	1,790
Police Station	4,911	1,198
Power Plant	4,651	1,134
West Point	3,649	890
Total:	34,605	8,439

== Social issues ==
=== Sanitation ===
The area lacks proper sanitation and public toilets. and a 2009 report by United Nations Office for the Coordination of Humanitarian Affairs estimated that there were four public toilets in the area. Pay toilets exist, but residents cannot afford them, and thus public defecation is common. The beach surrounding West Point is often used as a lavatory which creates health hazards as the water is used for drinking and fish from the water are consumed.

=== Child sexual abuse ===
Child prostitution and sex tourism is said to be rampant in the place with minor-aged girls reported to have engaged in these activities. During the Liberian Civil Wars, rape and sexual abuses were uncontrolled and widespread which were committed by several militant groups. This gave rise to the number of infected children with AIDS/HIV.

In 2018, Katie Meyler's More Than Me Foundation school located in West Point received multiple reports and controversies about rape and sexual abuses in her own institution which were then committed by Macintosh Johnson, the co-founder and staff of the school. These were published by several news agencies internationally leading to widespread investigations by the police. The serial rapist was reported to have abused "dozens" of young girls, aged 9-16, enrolled in the school. After more search, the police determined that Johnson had AIDS. Meyler then stepped down as the leading figure of the foundation.

== See also ==
- Clara Town
- Ebola virus epidemic in Liberia
- Freeport of Monrovia

General:

- Slums in Africa
