= Nedowein =

Village in Margibi County, Liberia

Nedowein (or Nidowin) is a village in Margibi County, Liberia, near the capital Monrovia's international airport.

A case of Ebola virus disease was diagnosed in Nedowein in late June 2015, leading to a number of people in the village being put under quarantine.
