= Ganta United Methodist Hospital =

- United Methodist Church

Geography
- Location: Ganta, Nimba County, Liberia
- Coordinates: 7°14′16″N 8°57′54″W

Services
- Emergency department: Yes

History
- Founded: 1926

Ganta United Methodist Hospital is a hospital in Ganta, northeast Liberia. The hospital serves a population of around 450,000 in Liberia and neighbouring countries.

== History ==
The hospital was established in 1926 by Dr. George Way Harley and his wife Winifred. It had to close after severe damage by looting and a rocket attack during the summer of 2003, but reopened in March 2004.

== Capabilities ==
In 2005, the hospital had two physicians, an ophthalmologist, and a general practitioner who also carried out surgery. Services provided by the hospital included an outpatient clinic, obstetrics, pediatrics, and laboratory services. It also ran an Eye Project with a jeep-equipped outreach team to bring patients for operations such as cataract removal.

The hospital is part of a complex which includes a leprosy and tuberculosis rehabilitation centre, schools and vocational training facilities, and a demonstration farm.

== See also ==
- List of hospitals in Liberia
