= George Harley (painter) =

Watercolour painter and drawing-master

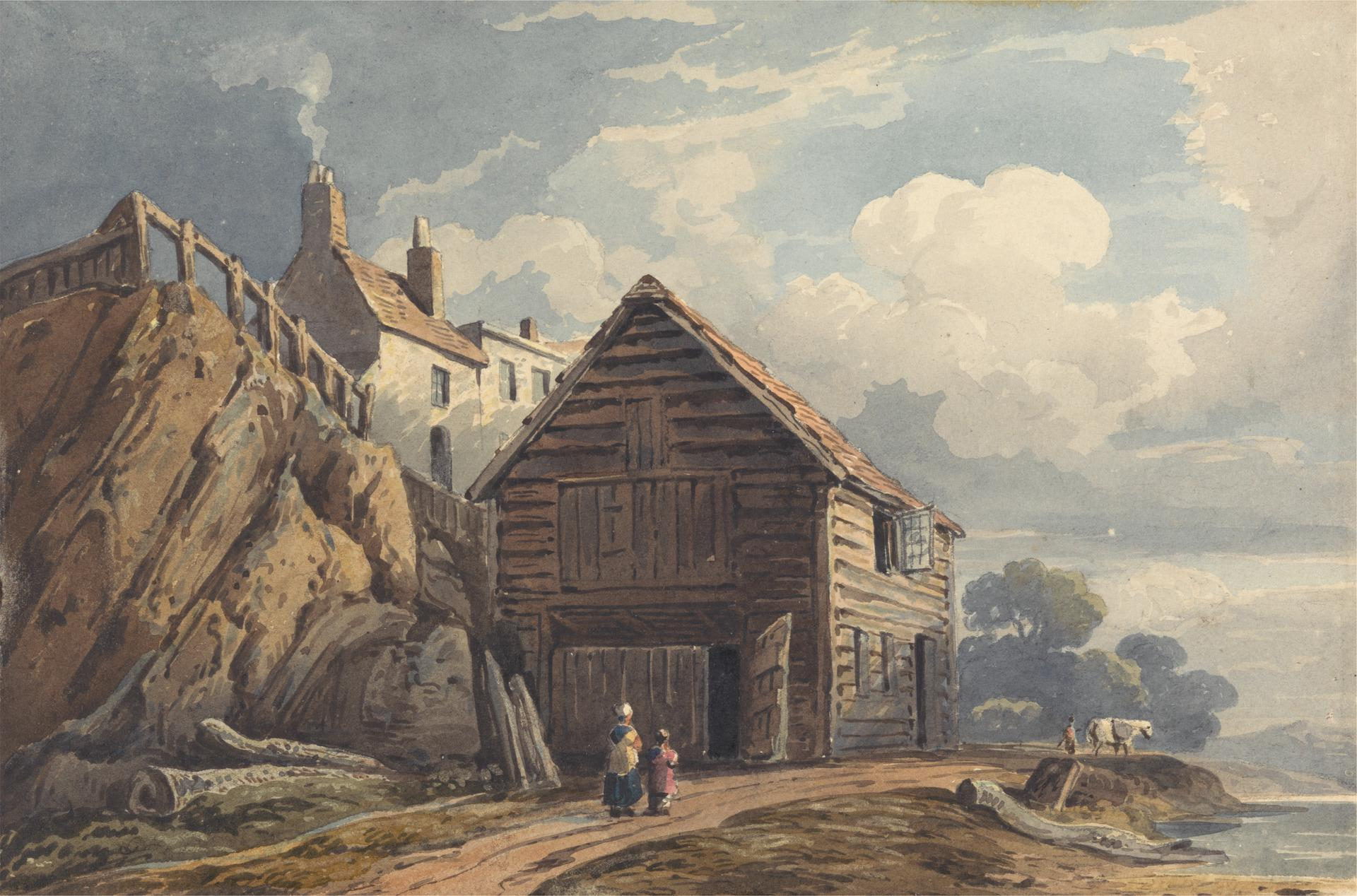
Landscape with a Boatshed

George Harley (1791–1871) was an English water-colour painter and drawing-master.

== Life ==
George Harley, born in 1791, appears as an exhibitor at the Royal Academy in 1817, when he sent two drawings of views in London. He had a large practice as a drawing-master, and drew in lithography some landscape drawings, as Lessons in Landscape, for Messrs. Rowney & Forster's series of lithographic drawing-books, published in 1820–2. In 1848 he published a small Guide to Pencil and Chalk Drawing from Landscape, dedicated to his past and present pupils, which reached a second edition.

Harley died in 1871, aged eighty, and was buried on the western side of Highgate Cemetery.

== Works ==
There are two water-colour drawings by Harley in the print room at the British Museum, one being a view of Maxstoke Priory, Warwickshire. A view of Fulham Church and Putney Bridge entered the collection of the South Kensington Museum.

== Gallery ==
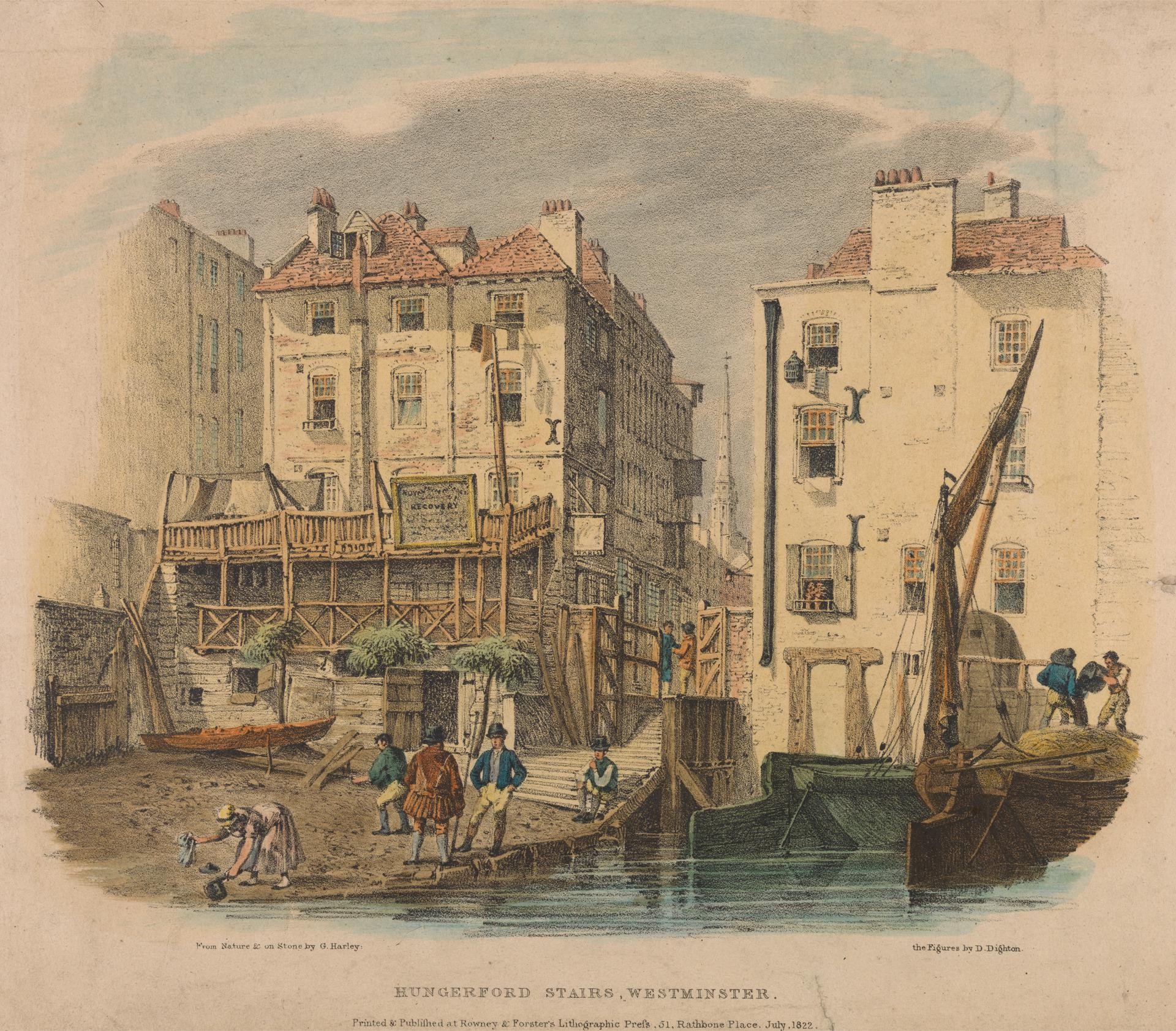
Hungerford Stairs, Westminster (1822)

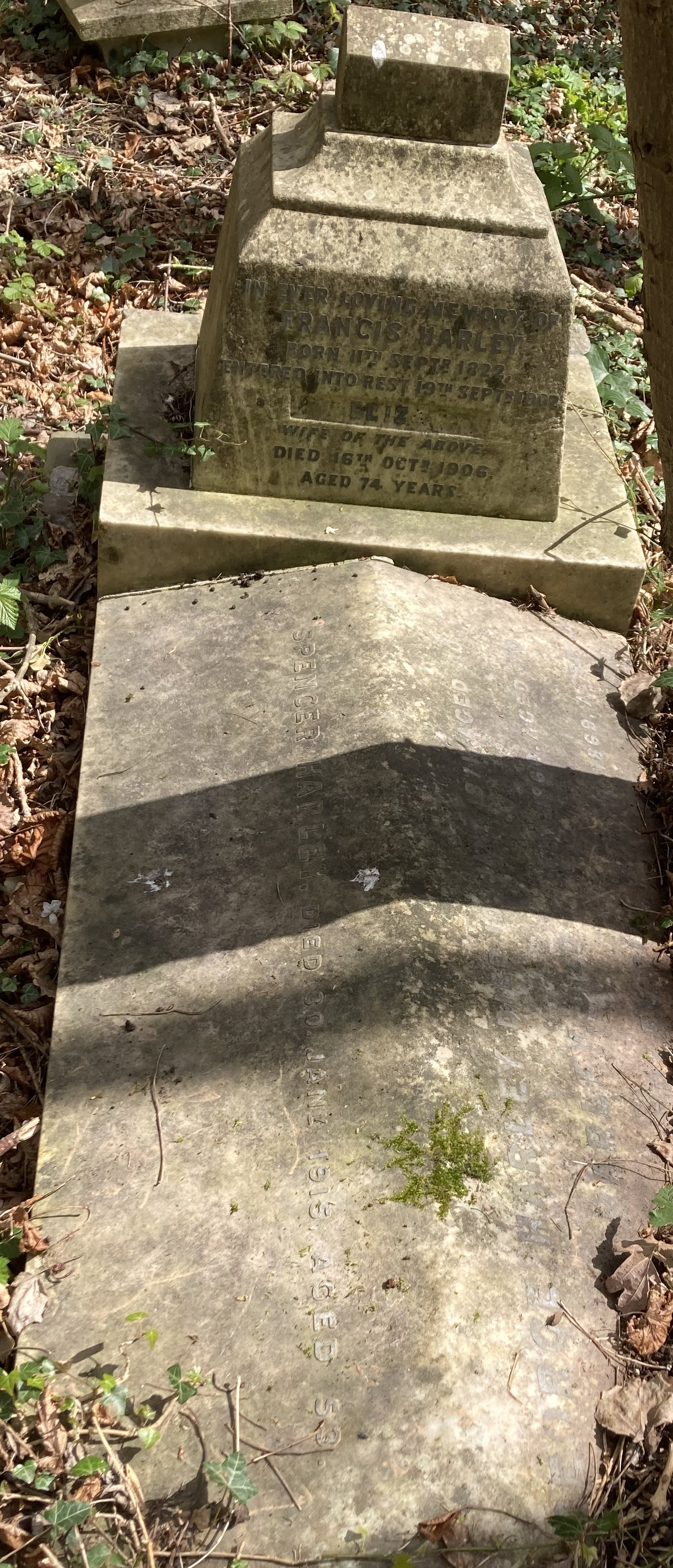
Grave of George Harley in Highgate Cemetery
