= George Way Harley =

American Methodist medical missionary

- Born: 8 August 1894; Asheville, North Carolina, US
- Died: 7 November 1966 (aged 72); Merry Point, Lancaster County, Virginia, US
- Occupations: Medical Doctor, Missionary
- Known for: Ganta, Liberia mission

George Way Harley (8 August 1894 – 7 November 1966) was an American Methodist medical missionary. He spent 35 years in Ganta, Liberia, where he established Ganta Hospital, a school and a church. He was known for his research into the local culture, and received many honors from the Liberian government and from American and British institutions. Major collections of ceremonial masks purchased by Harley in Liberia are held in the Peabody Museum of Archaeology and Ethnology at Harvard University and the Anthropology Department of the College of William & Mary.

== Early years ==
George Way Harley was born in Asheville, North Carolina on 8 August 1894 to George Gamewell Harley (1862–1925), a Methodist minister, and Lillie Way Harley. Harley wanted to become a missionary from an early age. He was raised in Brevard, Bessemer City, Norwood and Concord. He attended Trinity College (now Duke University) in Durham, North Carolina, and graduated with a B.A. in 1916. He was a high school teacher for a year in New Bern, North Carolina and then the head of a carpenter gang at Camp Jackson, South Carolina.

Harley enlisted in the Medical Corps in June 1918 and was assigned to the Chemical Warfare Unit in the Brady Laboratory of the Yale School of Medicine. He studied pathological museum techniques and embalming at McGill University before entering Yale University, where he obtained an M.D. in 1923. He then spent a year as an intern at the Municipal Hospital in Hartford, Connecticut. Harley married Winifred Jewell of Merrimac, Massachusetts on 4 August 1923. She had graduated from Bates College and taught high school before attending Yale University, where she met Harley. They had three sons.

In 1924, Harley applied successfully for a position at the Methodist Episcopal church mission in Ganta, Liberia. He spent the summer at Wilfred Grenfell's Harrington Hospital in Labrador, then from September 1924 to February 1925 studied at the Kennedy School of Missions of the Hartford Seminary. At the same time he took a course in metalworking at the local high school in Hartford. He attended the London School of Tropical Medicine from May to September 1925, took a map-making course at the Royal Geographical Society and studied under a craftsman potter for a month.

== Medical missionary ==
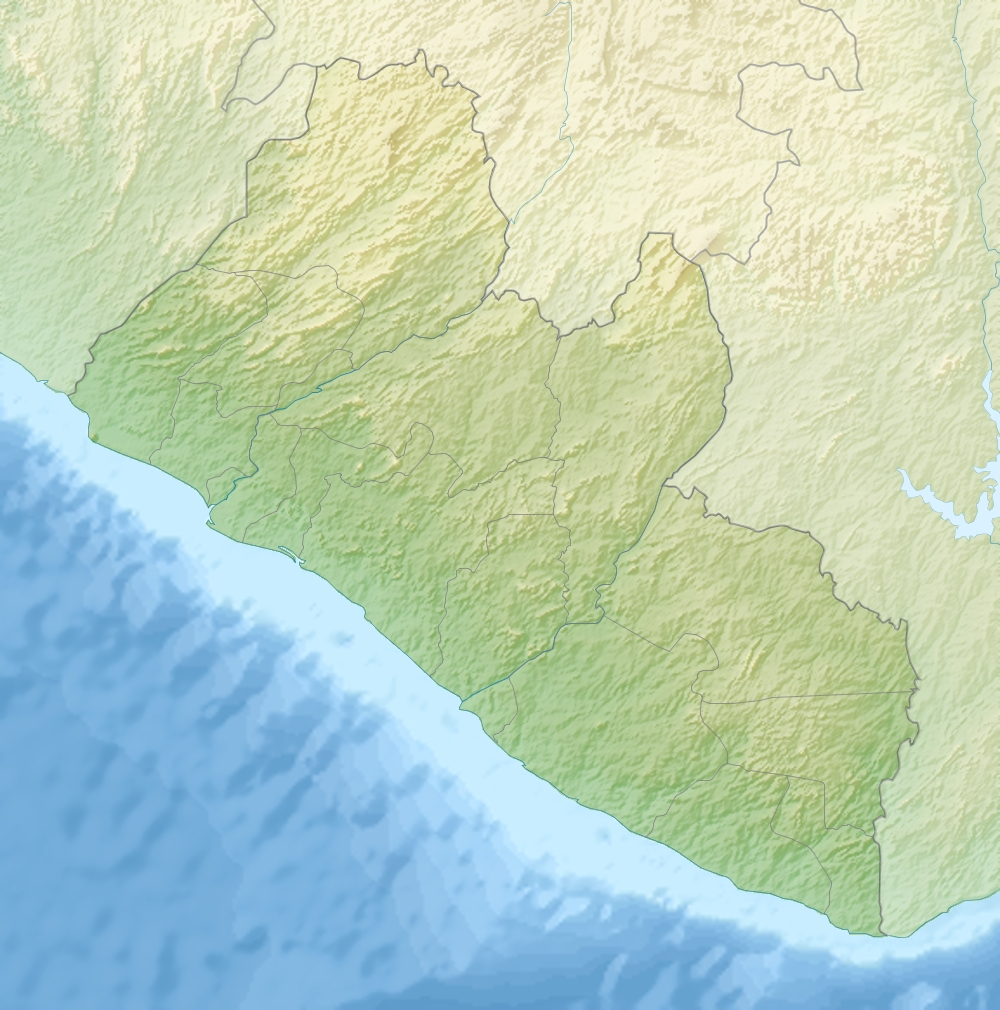
Location of Ganta in Liberia

The Liberian government, based at Monrovia on the western coast, began to establish some level of military control over the interior in the early 20th century. This made it possible to establish a mission in the late 1920s in the densely forested and sparsely populated northeast interior region. The Poro societies, the secret men's societies, had been outlawed and were under growing pressure to dissolve. In the 1920s the government introduced a hut tax, a considerable hardship in regions that did not have a money-based economy, which may have helped Harley buy ceremonial masks for cash.

The Firestone Tire and Rubber Company was allowed to establish large rubber plantations in south-central Liberia, employing as many as 10,000 laborers, and private rubber plantations mostly owned by the government elite employed forced labor. Mandingo traders were granted land and encouraged to establish markets, selling imported goods in exchange for local produce such as kola and latex. The missionary schools opened up new opportunities to village children. All these changes combined to cause huge disruption, breaking down traditional social structures.

Harley left for Ganta, Liberia in October 1925, and remained in Liberia for 35 years apart from vacations. The Harleys spent four months in preparation in Monrovia before leaving for Ganta, where the government had given them permission to build a mission on 250 acres (100 ha) of land. Ganta is 150 miles (240 km) inland, and is the main village of the Mano people, who numbered 600,000 at the time. With local help the Harleys built the mission compound with several huts for use as a home, a medical dispensary and a chapel. Later they built a school and shops, a leper village and two "sick villages". Much later a hospital was built at Ganta, one of the best in Liberia.

Harley had not been ordained, but served as pastor of the church until 1948. His skill as a doctor quickly became well-known, and sometimes he had to treat 160 people in one day. However, at first the Harleys made little progress in converting the Mano to Christianity. Winifred gave birth to a son shortly after they reached Ganta, but he died of a tropical fever at the age of four. Harley recalled that his open grief when he buried his son came as a revelation to the villagers. The Harleys had decided to return to America after their son's death, but the whole village came to hear the next Sunday service. The Harleys began to make converts now that they had shown their humanity.

Harley took a scientific and practical approach to problem-solving. He tested wood samples for use in buildings to determine their resistance to insects, and he tested local remedies to find whether they were effective. He took great interest in teaching the local people and giving them industrial training. The novelist Graham Greene and his cousin Barbara Greene visited the Harleys at Ganta for three days in 1935. Greene was struck by the huge amount of work Harley undertook each day, leaving him too exhausted for conversation in the evening. Harley was made a member of the Guild of Blacksmiths in Liberia, uniquely for a white man. He received many honors from the government of Liberia. He helped the Liberian government with development projects, and acted as an adviser on a wide range of issues to the United States Public Health Service, the Peace Corps, the World Health Organization and other organizations.

== Anthropologist ==
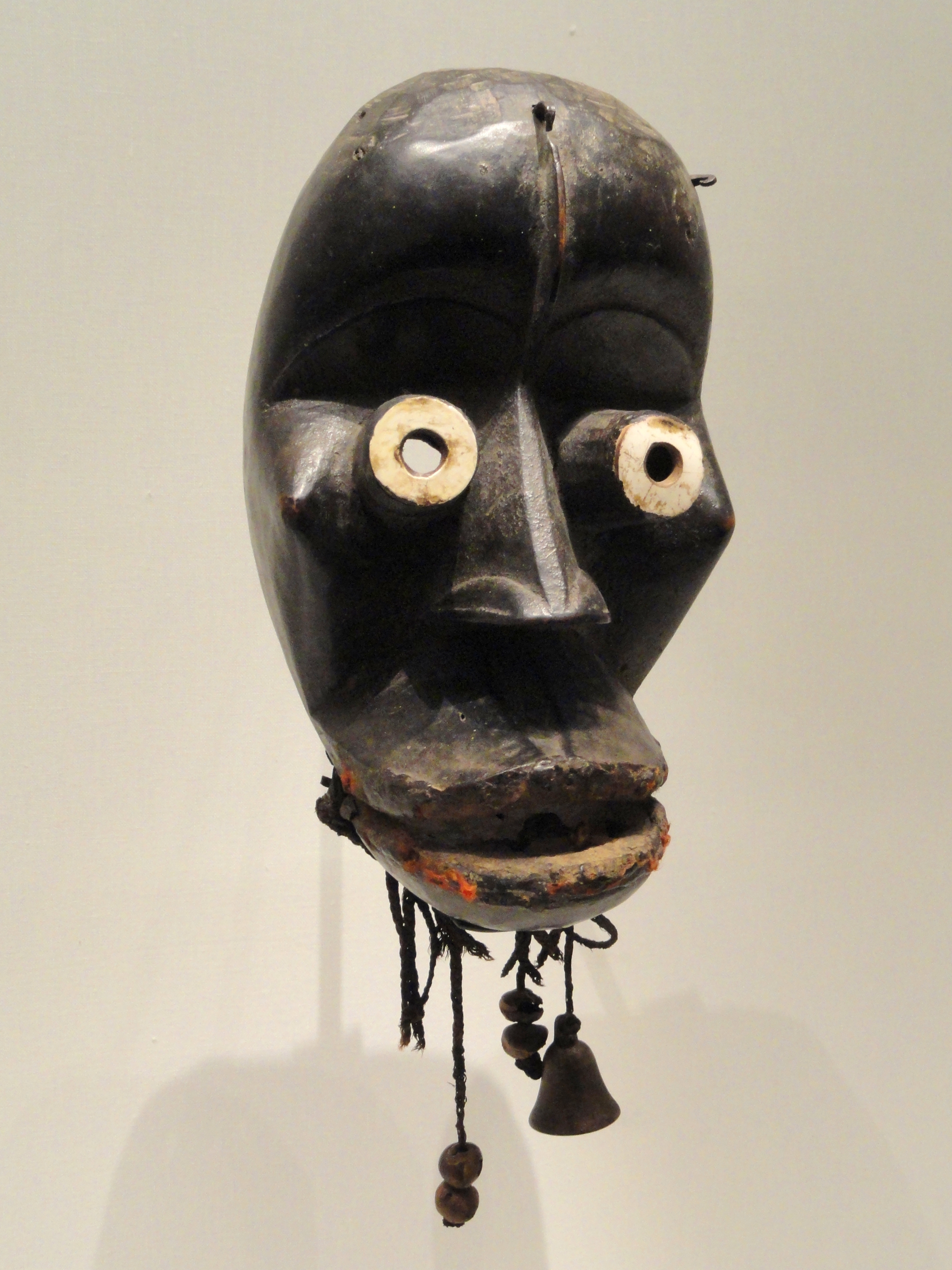
Mano mask from the early 20th century, The mask, made of wood, Formica, metal and seeds was collected by Harley between 1933 and 1937 and is now held by the Cleveland Museum of Art. Harley's handwritten label identifies the mask as "Dunuma, Chief Devil of the Poro, Mano ... owned by the late Se Gola of the half Mano, half Kpelle town of Gbotai, in the Lao section, near the St. John River."

In 1928 the Harleys were visited by George Schwab and his wife, a missionary couple involved in anthropological research. Schwab helped introduce Harley to the anthropologist Earnest Hooton of Harvard, the start of a long professional relationship. Harley studied anthropology and tropical medicine as a graduate student at Harvard in his first furlough from Liberia (1930–31), and was appointed a field associate for Harvard. He held this position for the rest of his missionary career. He spent his subsequent furloughs in 1938, 1944, 1948 and 1952 at the Peabody Museum of Archaeology and Ethnology at Harvard where he worked with the displays of artifacts, wrote and studied. He was also a fellow of the Royal Geographical Society, the Royal Anthropological Institute and the Royal School of Tropical Medicine and Hygiene.

Harley studied local medicine and wrote a thesis on the subject that earned him a PhD in 1938 from the Kennedy School of Missions. His thesis on Native African Medicine was published by Harvard University Press in 1941. He also published articles on medicine, geography and anthropology in various journals. Harley's wife Winifred was a full participant in the mission and looked after the finances. Winifred was a trained botanist, and collected botanical specimens. She published six articles on the plants she found. She cared for the sick, taught and helped study the Mano people and their use of medicinal plants, while raising her three sons.

Between 1930 and 1948 Harley purchased and cataloged 391 wooden face masks for the Peabody museum, mostly from Mano- and Dan-speaking peoples. He wrote two essays on the masks, Notes on the Poro in Liberia (1941) and Masks as Agents of Social Control in Northeast Liberia (1950) which described the function of the masks in secret societies and by local leaders. These essays became very influential from the late 1950s onward, and art dealers and publications took to labeling all masks from northeast Liberia as Poro masks. Harley also bought masks for himself, and sold them to help fund his sons' college educations, and for income in his retirement. The manufacture and sales of masks helped fund the leper colony at Ganta. Harley's approach to collecting and documenting reflected the anthropological theories of the time, and included an effort to classify the masks by type and relate the classification to social functions.

Harley bought the masks from vendors, usually Dan-speakers, who brought them to Harley's house at night. He asked the vendor where the mask came from and what purpose the mask had, and recorded this information on a label attached to the mask. The supply of masks grew to a peak in 1939, perhaps due to social changes that made them less valuable, then began to dry up with prices rising as American and European collectors entered the market. At first Harley was discriminating, looking for masks to represent the different types that he had identified. Later he tended to buy all that was offered, in the hope that a vendor of a low-value mask would later return with one of more interest. As Winifred Harley explained,

Some of the younger Mano men had masks, charms or fetishes in their possession which they may have inherited from a father or an uncle, to their own embarrassment ... The young men feared these things even though they did not entirely believe in them. When they knew that my husband bought "old things" they were tempted by the chance to shift the responsibility, get the troublesome things off their hands, and come into a sum of money as well.

Harley became intrigued by the men's secret societies, which he called "Poro" after other ethnographies, and which conducted elaborate initiation ceremonies for boys. The masked officials of the societies had supernatural powers derived from ancestral spirits, and exercised broad authority that extended beyond village boundaries. The Harleys were handicapped by never learning more than rudimentary Mano, so had to rely on translators. They did not and perhaps could not attend masking ceremonies in person. Harley contributed to George Schwab's Tribes of the Liberian Hinterland (1947), which he edited and which was largely based on material that had been collected by Harley. The book covered material culture, subsistence, technology and the economy, and gave some information on social organization and religion. A 1949 reviewer said the book was excellent in providing factual information, but was weak in anthropological analysis and showed strong ethnocentric bias. Thus natives are said to have no moral sense since they do not know of "sinning against God." The book was weak or misleading in its interpretation of local religion and social structures.

== Death and legacy ==
In 1960 the Harleys retired to Merry Point, Lancaster County, Virginia where he suffered a fatal heart attack on 7 November 1966 at age 72 . His ashes were flown to Liberia and buried near the Ganta Church. Liberia declared a national day of mourning on his death. President William Tubman publicly praised Harley's long service on behalf of the people of Liberia. His wife moved back to New England, where she wrote a book about her life's work titled A Third of a Century with George Way Harley in Liberia (1973). She died on 31 December 1979. Harley was an old-school missionary who felt for the local people but did not mix with them. He judged himself and others severely, was devoted to duty, quick tempered and dour in nature.

When Harley retired from Liberia in 1960 there were over 26 buildings at the mission including a school, woodworking shop, blacksmith's shop, leper colony, hospital, dormitories, and hotel. During the Second Liberian Civil War, in 2003 the mission was damaged by rebel missiles, but it was rebuilt. A collection of 274 objects that the Harleys had collected while at Ganta was purchased in 1965 by Professor Nathan Altshuler, one of the founders of the Anthropology Department at the College of William & Mary, and presented to the college as a teaching resource. His cataloged collection of 391 wooden face masks in the Peabody museum is justly famous for its size and variety, and the many excellent examples of Mano and Dan masks.

== Publications ==
- Harley, George Way (1941). Notes on the Poro in Liberia.
- Harley, George Way (1941). Native African Medicine with Special Reference to its Practice in the Mano Tribe of Liberia. Ph.D. dissertation for the Hartford Seminary Foundation.
- Schwab, George (1947). Harley, George Way (ed.). Tribes of the Liberian Hinterland.
- Harley, George Way (1950). Masks as Agents of Social Control in Northeast Liberia.

== Sources ==
- Adams, Monni (2009-03-23). "Both Sides of the Collecting Encounter: The George W. Harley Collection at the Peabody Museum of Archaeology and Ethnology, Harvard University". Museum Anthropology. 32 (1): 17–32. doi:10.1111/j.1548-1379.2009.01018.x.
- "African Objects from the Ganta Mission, Liberia". The College of William & Mary. 2014.
- "George W. Harley Collection". College of William & Mary.
- "Guide to the George Way Harley Papers, 1911-1975". Duke University.
- Herzog, George (1949). "Tribes of the Liberian Hinterland by George Schwab; George W. Harley". American Anthropologist. 51 (2): 304–306. doi:10.1525/aa.1949.51.2.02a00140. JSTOR 664116.
- Kervick, Patricia H. (2011). "Harley, George W., 1894-1966 and Winifred J. Harley, 1895-1979, Letters, 1922-1980, inclusive: A Finding Aid". Peabody Museum Archives, Harvard University.
- Levy, Suzanne S. (1988-10-28). "Harley, George Way". Dictionary of North Carolina Biography: Vol. 3, H-K. Univ of North Carolina Press. ISBN 978-0-8078-6713-6.
- Mark, Joan (1998-12-01). The King of the World in the Land of the Pygmies. U of Nebraska Press. ISBN 978-0-8032-8250-6.
- Petridis, Constantine (Spring 2012). "A "Harley Mask" at the Cleveland Museum of Art". African Arts. 45: 16–31. doi:10.1162/afar.2012.45.1.16. S2CID 57563281.
- Seamands, Stephen (2012-03-08). Give Them Christ: Preaching His Incarnation, Crucifixion, Resurrection, Ascension and Return. InterVarsity Press. ISBN 978-0-8308-6983-1.
- "The Collectors: George Way and Winifred J. Harley". The College of William & Mary. 2014.
