= Ganta =

City in Nimba County, Liberia

Ganta Gompa
- Location in Liberia
- Coordinates: 7°14′15″N 8°58′53″W
- Country: Liberia
- County: Nimba County
- Established: 1969

Government
  - Type: City Council
  - Mayor/Mayoress: Hon. Amos N. G. Suah

Population (2008)
  - Total: 41,106
  - Ethnicities density: 45/sq mi (17/km^{2})
  - Religions: Christian

Ganta, also known as Gompa City, is a town approximately 323 kilometres (201 mi) from Monrovia in Nimba County of northern Liberia. It is located just south of the Guinea border. It is the second-most populous city in Liberia, with an estimated population of 41,106 as of 2008. A bustling market town, it contains a prominent white mosque, noted for its decorated minarets of carved stars.

== Geography ==
It is connected by highway to Zwedru, some 238 kilometres (148 mi) to the southeast. The Mano River passes through the northern part of the town, marking the border between Liberia and Guinea.

== Economy ==
Ganta is an emerging city with a population of 41,106 as of 2008. As early as 1983, it was observed by the Foreign Broadcast Information Service that it had the potential to become "one of the most developed and commercial cities in rural Liberia". As of 2007, there are five banks in Ganta with other financial institutions. The city contains Jackie's Guest House, the Alvino Hotel, the Beer Garden, Justina Bar and Restaurant etc. In 2004, some 20 acres of land near Ganta were purchased to build a new college, costing $13,500.

== Healthcare ==
American Methodist missionary and physician George Way Harley began working in Ganta in October 1925, where he established a new hospital, dispensary, church, school, and several residences. He found a leper colony there at the time, and established a new Mission in Ganta in 1926. Ganta Hospital serves 450,000 people in Nimba County and surrounding areas. As of 2008 it had 32 beds, with the expectation to grow to 50.

In September 2014, it was reported that two female victims of the Ebola virus in Ganta, Dorris Quoi and Ma Kebeh, had been "resurrected".
