= Ebola virus epidemic in Liberia =

Health disaster in Africa

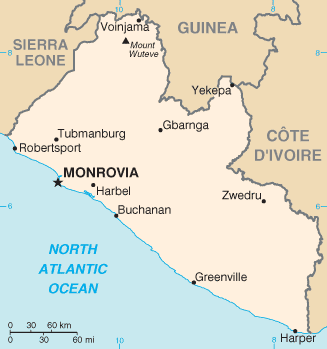
- A map of Liberia
- Cases contracted in Liberia: 10,675 (as of 7 April 2016)
- Deaths: 4,809 (as of 7 April 2016)

Location of Liberia in Africa

An epidemic of Ebola virus disease occurred in Liberia from 2014 to 2016, along with the neighbouring countries of Guinea and Sierra Leone. The first cases of virus were reported by late March 2014. The Ebola virus, a biosafety level four pathogen, is an RNA virus discovered in 1976.

Before the outbreak of the Ebola epidemic the country had 50 doctors for its population of 4.3 million. The country's health system was seriously weakened by a civil war that ended in 2003.

== History ==
=== West African outbreak ===
Researchers generally believe that a two-year-old boy, later identified as Emile Ouamouno, who died in December 2013 in the village of Meliandou, Guéckédou Prefecture, Guinea, was the index case of the current Ebola virus disease epidemic. His mother, sister, and grandmother then became ill with similar symptoms and also died. People infected by those initial cases spread the disease to other villages. Although Ebola represents a major public health issue in sub-Saharan Africa, no cases had ever been reported in West Africa and the early cases were diagnosed as other diseases more common to the area. Thus, the disease had several months to spread before it was recognized as Ebola.

== Start of outbreak: 2014 ==
On 30 March 2014, Liberia confirmed its first two cases of Ebola virus disease in Foya, Lofa County.

=== Early events ===
By 23 April, thirty-four cases and six deaths from Ebola in Liberia were recorded. By 17 June, sixteen people had died from the disease in the country. The initial cases were thought to be malaria, an extremely common disease in Liberia, and thus leading to doctors being infected with the Ebola virus.

By 17 June, the first deaths occurred in Monrovia from Ebola when seven patients died from the disease. Among them was a nurse, along with other members of her household. At the time, there were about 16 cases reported in Liberia in total. The nurse was treated at Redemption Hospital, a free state-run health care facility in New Kru Town, west of Monrovia.

On 2 July, the head surgeon of Redemption Hospital died from the disease. He was treated at the JFK Medical Center in Monrovia. Following his death Redemption Hospital was shut down, and patients were either transferred or referred to other facilities in the area. By 21 July, four nurses at Phebe Hospital in Bong County contracted the disease. On 27 July, Samuel Brisbane, one of Liberia's top doctors, died from Ebola. A doctor from Uganda also died from the disease. Two U.S. health care workers, one a doctor (Kent Brantly) and the other a nurse were also infected with the disease. Both of them missionaries, they were medically evacuated from Liberia to the US for treatment where they made a full recovery.

By 28 July, most border crossings had been closed, with medical checkpoints set up at the remaining ports and quarantines in some areas. Arik Air suspended all flights between Nigeria and Liberia. On 30 July, Liberia shut down its schools in an attempt to prevent the outbreak from spreading.

=== August ===
On the first weekend of August, locals quarreled with a burial team trying to bury 22 bodies. The police were summoned and order was restored. On 4 August, the Liberian government ordered all corpses of those who died to be cremated. The body of a patient who died from Ebola is highly contagious in the days following the death. At the time, there were 156 recorded deaths from the disease in Liberia.

On 11 August, the Ivorian government announced the suspension of all flights to and from countries affected by Ebola. Ten days later, it decided to close its borders as well with Guinea and Liberia, the two countries most affected by Ebola. On 27 August, wild dogs were seen eating the corpses that had not been collected for burial. A pack of dogs were observed digging up bodies and eating them in Liberia. One study indicated that dogs may eat at Ebola-infected carcasses and may become carriers of the disease.

==== West Point quarantine (19–30 Aug) ====
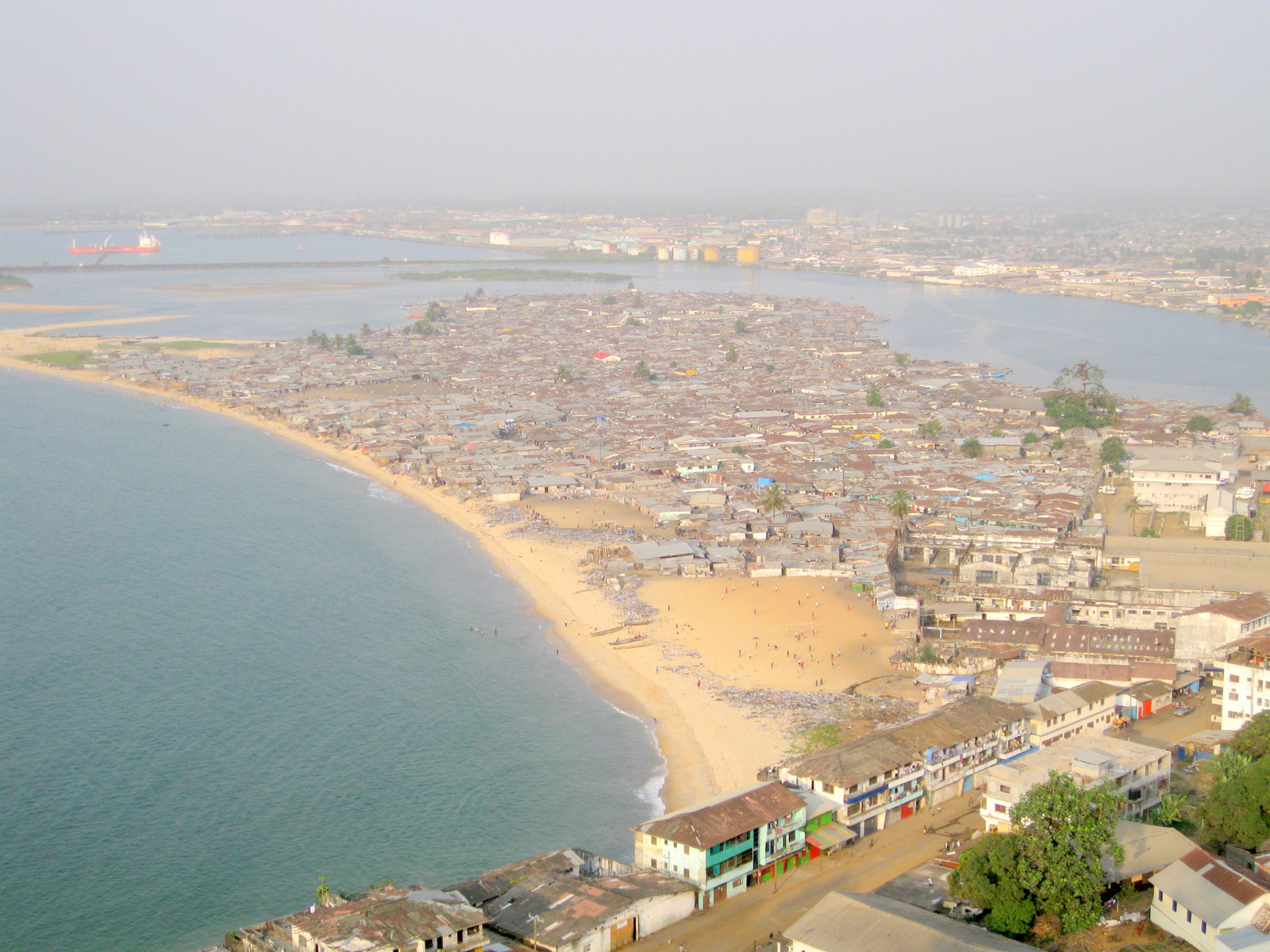
A view of the West Point area of Monrovia

On 18 August, a mob of residents from West Point, an impoverished area of Monrovia, descended upon a local Ebola clinic to protest its presence. The protesters turned violent, threatening the caretakers, removing the infected patients, and looting the clinic of its supplies, including blood-stained bed sheets and mattresses. Police and aid workers expressed fear that this would lead to mass infections of Ebola in West Point.

On 19 August, the Liberian government quarantined the entirety of West Point and issued a curfew statewide. Violence again broke out on 22 August, after the military fired on protesting crowds. An inquiry into the incident found the security forces at fault, stating they "fired with complete disregard for human life". The quarantine blockade of the West Point area was lifted on 30 August. The Information Minister, Lewis Brown, said that this step was taken to ease efforts to screen, test, and treat residents.

=== September ===
By 1 September, Ivory Coast announced the opening of humanitarian corridors with its two affected neighboring countries. On 20 September, Liberia opened a new 150-bed treatment unit clinic in Monrovia. At the opening ceremony of the Old Island Clinic on Bushrod Island six ambulances were already waiting with suspected Ebola patients. More patients were waiting by the clinic after making their way on foot with the help of relatives. Two days later 112 beds were already filled with 46 patients testing positive for Ebola, while the rest were admitted for observation. This expanded the number of beds in the city beyond 240. Its capacity was exceeded within 24 hours with a shortage of staff and logistics to take care of a patient with correct precautions in place. One source says it opened on 21 September 2014, with a 100-bed capacity. As of 23 September, there had been 3,458 total cases, 1,830 deaths, and 914 lab confirmed cases according to the World Health Organization.

By late September, there were three clinics in Monrovia. Despite this patients waiting to be treated died outside as the clinics had run out of space to treat the increasing number of patients. If patients could not get a bed in the clinic they sometimes waited in holding centers until a bed opened up. There were additional cases in Monrovia where the bodies were dumped into the river. One woman used trash bags to protect herself as she cared for four other family members ill with Ebola. Her father became ill in late July, but they could not find a place of treatment for him and ended up doing home-care.

On 25 September, Liberia's chief medical official went on a self-enforced quarantine after her assistant died from the disease, fearing she might have been accidentally exposed to the virus. By 29 September it was announced she tested negative for Ebola and government officials praised her for following the self quarantine protocol. A few days later, on 28 September Ivory Coast resumed flights to Liberia which had been suspended since 11 August 2014, after WHO's critique for tending to economically strangle the affected nations. From the beginning of the crisis, WHO has discouraged closing the borders with affected countries.

On 30 September, a cameraman was tested positive for Ebola in a Texas hospital after contracting the disease before traveling back to the United States from Liberia. He covered the Ebola outbreak for NBC News (see 2014 Ebola virus cases in the United States). Following this the Liberian government enacted strict restrictions on journalistic coverage aimed at protecting patients' privacy.

=== October ===
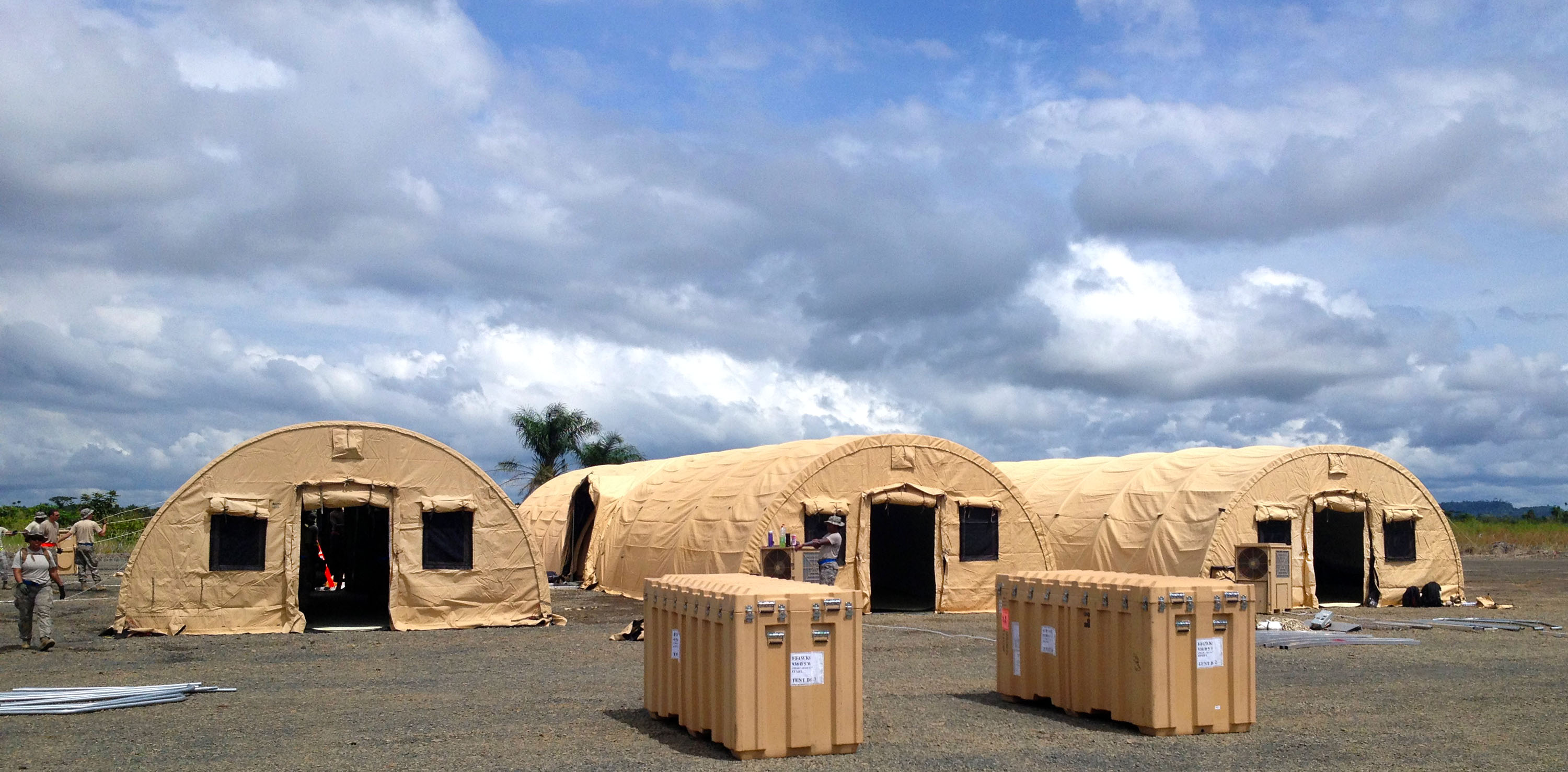
The 25-bed Monrovia Medical Unit was constructed for health care workers supporting Operation United Assistance.

In early October, Ellen Johnson Sirleaf, the President of Liberia, continued requesting more aid to fight the disease. On 2 October, a new 60-bed clinic was opened in Kenema. By then, the outbreak was described as being out of control and an exponential growth in cases was seen. The focus shifted to slowing the outbreak down. A key element was that the health care establishments were overwhelmed thus leading to those infected being turned away from treatment centers. This eventually led to the infection of others taking care of sick or dying patients at home.

By 3 October, at least eight Liberian soldiers died after contracting the disease from a female visitor. On 3 October more medical supplies arrived from Germany. On that same day Gerlib opened up an Ebola isolation ward at its 48-bed facility in Paynesville (Monrovia). On 10 October all journalists were banned from entering Ebola clinics.

On 14 October, a hundred U.S. troops arrived in Liberia, bringing the total to 565 to aid in the fight against the deadly disease. On 16 October, U.S. President Obama authorized, via executive order, the use of National Guard and reservists in Liberia. A report on 15 October indicates that Liberia may need 80,000 more body bags and about 1 million protective suits for the next six months. In October, WHO pushed for its 70-70-60 plan to control the outbreak. By 19 October, it was reported that 223 health care workers had been infected with Ebola, and 103 of them had died in Liberia.

On 19 October, the President of Liberia apologized to the Mayor of Dallas, for the Liberian national that brought the disease to the United States. By 19 October, only one area in Liberia, Grand Gedeh County, had yet to report an Ebola case. 14 out of the 15 districts have reported cases. The disease had been noted to be spreading in Monrovia, the nation's capital with over one million inhabitants. Monrovia was particularly affected with 305 new cases reported in the week ending 19 October.

=== November ===
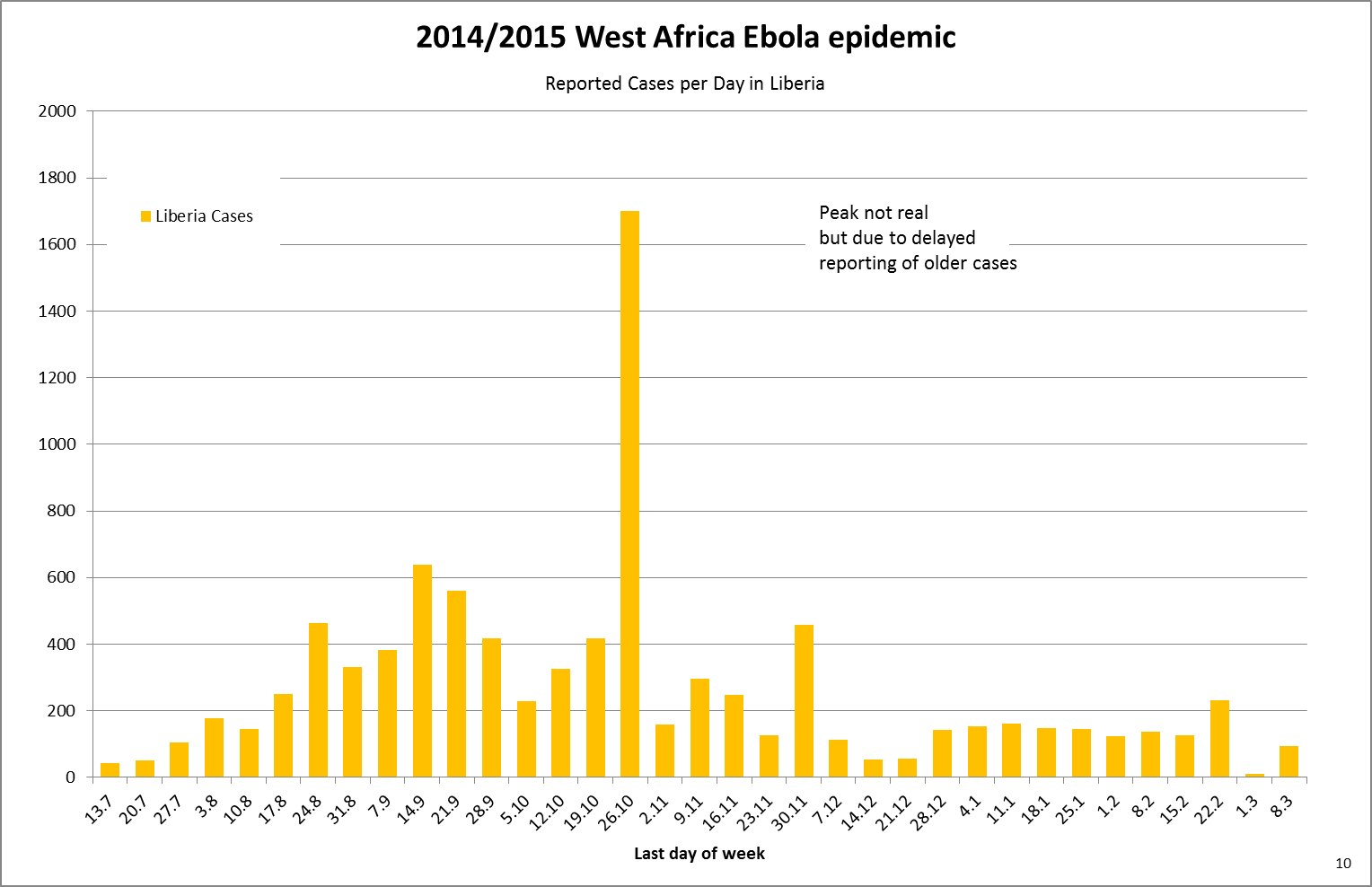
The reported weekly cases of Ebola in Liberia as listed on Wikipedia's 2014 Ebola Virus in West Africa timeline of reported cases and deaths; some values are interpolated.

By 5 November, Liberia had 6,525 cases (including 1,627 probable, 2,447 suspected cases) and 2,697 deaths. The 5 November WHO situation report noted that, "There appears to be some evidence of a decline at the national level in Liberia, although new case numbers remain high in parts of the country." A report by CDC released on 14 November, based on data collected from Lofa county, indicates that there has been a genuine reduction in new infections. This is credited to an integrated strategy combining isolation and treatment with community behaviour change including safe burial practices, case finding and contract tracing – this strategy might serve as a model to implement in other affected areas to accelerate control of Ebola. Roselyn Nugba-Ballah led the Safe & Dignified Burial Practices Team for the Liberian Red Cross and was awarded the Florence Nightingale Medal for her work during the crisis in 2017.

On 13 November, the Liberian President announced the lifting of the state of emergency in the country following the decrease in the number of new cases in the country. The decline in Liberia cases was contradicted in reports from WHO with 439 new cases reported between 23 and 28 November.

=== December ===
On 4 December, it was reported that President Sirleaf banned all rallies and gatherings in Monrovia before the senatorial election, fearing that the risk of the Ebola virus spreading may be increased.

== Outbreak continues: 2015 ==
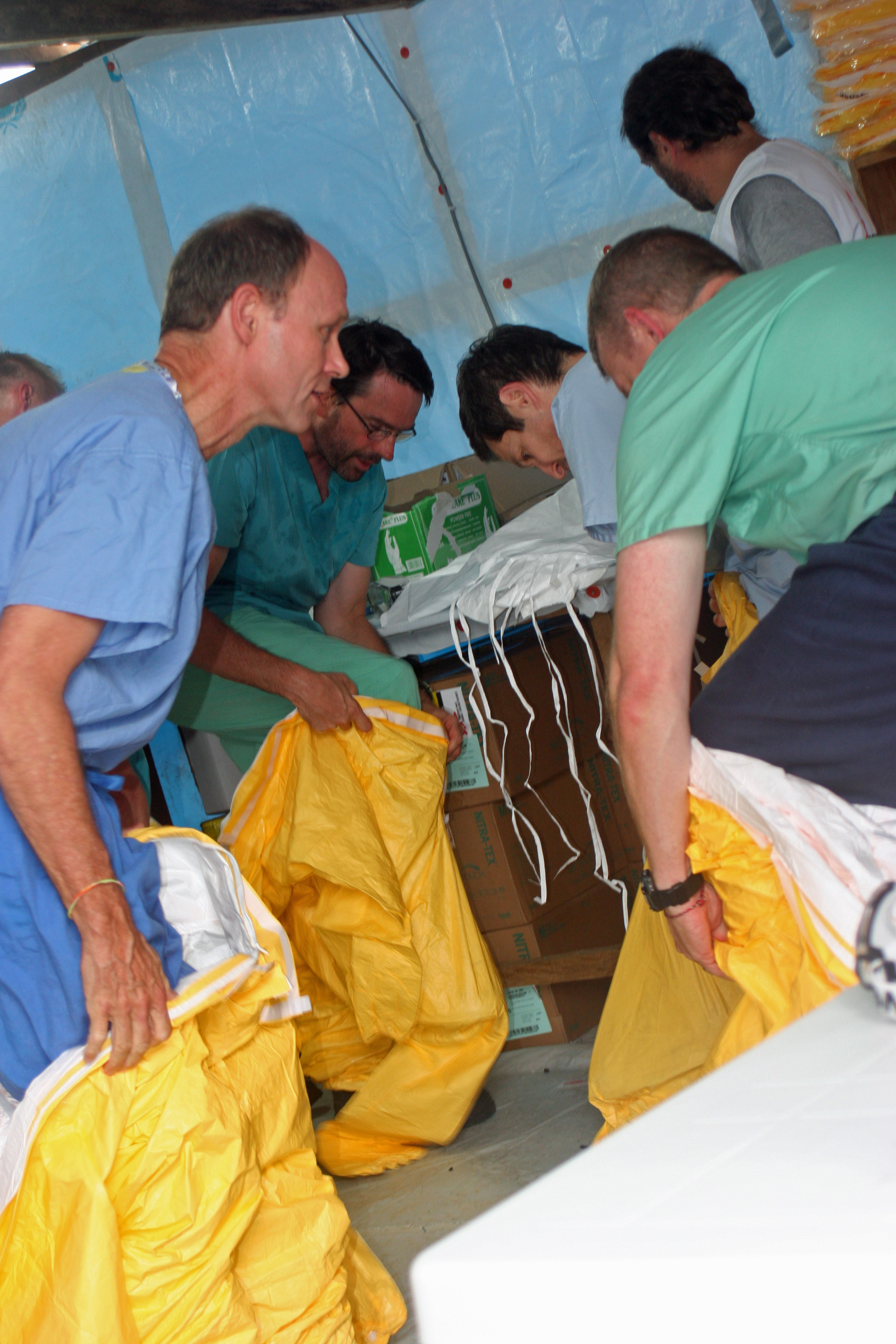
Doctors from Médecins Sans Frontières and the American CDC put on protective gear before entering an Ebola treatment ward in Liberia, August 2014.

On 13 January 2015, the Liberian government announced that new cases of Ebola in Liberia were now restricted to only two of its counties: Grand Cape Mount County and Montserrado County. On 28 January, the ELWA-3 Ebola treatment centre in Monrovia was partially dismantled. When the centre opened in August it had been swamped with patients, even needing to turn some away, but according to staff it was now down to only two patients. The MSF field coordinator said that as of that date Liberia was down to only five confirmed cases in all of Liberia. On 30 January, Liberia extended school reopenings by two weeks. On 10 February, the U.S. military indicated it would end its relief mission. On 20 February, Liberia opened its land borders.

In the first week of March, the World Health Organization announced that Liberia had released its last Ebola patient after going a week without any new cases of the virus being reported. If the country had reported no new cases for 42 days, it would be declared Ebola-free according to the WHO.

On 5 March Tolbert Nyeswah, the assistant health minister of Liberia, reported that the country have released their last confirmed case of Ebola from a Chinese-staffed treatment centre. Beatrice Yardoldo was the last confirmed case and has been treated since 18 February. No new cases were reported for two weeks. On 20 March Moses Massaquoi, leader of the Clinton Health Access Initiative in Liberia, reported a new confirmed case in the country. The patient developed symptoms on 15 March, and was tested positive on 20 March. Subsequently, the patient died on 27 March.

The countdown restarted on 28 March, following the burial of the last casualty. The country was officially declared Ebola-free on 9 May, after 42 days passed with no new cases of Ebola being reported. As of May 2015, the country remained on high alert against recurrence of the disease.

=== June/July ===
Three months passed with no new reports of cases. However, on 29 June, Liberia reported that the body of a 17-year-old youth, who had been treated for malaria, tested positive for Ebola. The patient was from Nedowein, a village in Margibi County near the capital Monrovia's international airport.

The WHO announced the male youth had been in close contact with at least 102 people with no recent history of traveling. Contact tracing followed with visitors from affected areas and those attending his funeral. On 1 July a second case was confirmed. By 2 July a third new case was confirmed leading to the possibility that they might have been infected with the Ebola virus lurking in animal meat according to researchers. All three cases may be linked to a dog meat meal they shared.

=== September ===
"Today, 3 September 2015, WHO declares Liberia free of Ebola virus transmission in the human population. Forty-two days have passed since the second negative test on 22 July 2015 of the last laboratory-confirmed case. Liberia now enters a 90-day period of heightened surveillance...".

"WHO commends the Government of Liberia and its people on the successful response to this recent re-emergence. It is in full accord with government calls for sustained vigilance...".

=== November ===
After two months of going Ebola-free, on 20 November, a new case was confirmed when a 15-year-old boy was diagnosed with Ebola and two family members subsequently tested positive as well. Health officials were concerned because the child had not recently travelled or been exposed to someone with Ebola and the WHO stated, "we believe that this is probably again, somehow, someone who has come in contact with a virus that had been persisting in an individual, who had suffered the disease months ago." Two members of the US CDC were sent to the country to help to ascertain the cause of the new cases. The infected boy died on 24 November, and on 3 December the two remaining cases were released after recovering from the virus. The 42-day countdown toward Liberia being declared Ebola-free, for the third time, started on 4 December 2015 and ended on 14 January 2016 when Liberia was declared Ebola-free. On 16 December, WHO reaffirmed that the cases in Liberia were the result of re-emergence of the virus in a previously infected person, and there was speculation that the boy may have been infected by an individual who became infectious once more due to pregnancy which may have weakened her immune system. On 18 December, the WHO indicated that it still considers Ebola in West Africa a public health emergency, though progress has been made.

== January 2016 ==
After having completed the 42 day time period, Liberia was declared free from the virus on 14 January 2016, effectively ending the outbreak started in neighbouring Guinea two years earlier. Liberia however had a 90-day period of heightened surveillance which was scheduled to conclude on 13 April 2016.

=== April–June 2016 ===
On 1 April, it was reported that a new Ebola fatality had occurred in Liberia, and on 3 April, a second case was reported in Monrovia. On 4 April, it was reported that 84 individuals were under observation due to contact with the two confirmed cases of the virus. On 7 April, Liberia confirmed three new cases since the virus resurfaced. A total of 97 contacts, including 15 healthcare workers were being monitored. The index case of the new flare up was reported to be the wife of a patient who died from the virus in Guinea. She traveled to Monrovia after the funeral of her husband but died from the disease. The national Incident Management System (IMS) was immediately reactivated to coordinate the response to this flare-up and the counties enhanced the surveillance and prevention for a quick detention and interruption of transmission in case of eventual importation of cases from Monrovia. On 9 June, after 42 days, the country was declared Ebola-free.

== Healthcare capacity ==
=== Clinics ===
On 20 September 2014, Liberia opened the 150-bed Old Island Clinic on Bushrod Island in Monrovia. Another clinic in Monrovia is a 160-bed facility staffed and run by Médecins Sans Frontières. On 25 November China opened a "state of the art clinic" outside Monrovia. The 100-bed clinic was mostly staffed by Chinese medical and other personnel.

JFK (John F. Kennedy Medical Center) is another treatment center, and could hold 35 beds but expanded to 75 because of the increasing demand for beds. On 10 November, the U.S. opened the first of 17 Ebola treatment facilities it was building for Liberia, in Tubmanburg.

== Confounding factors ==
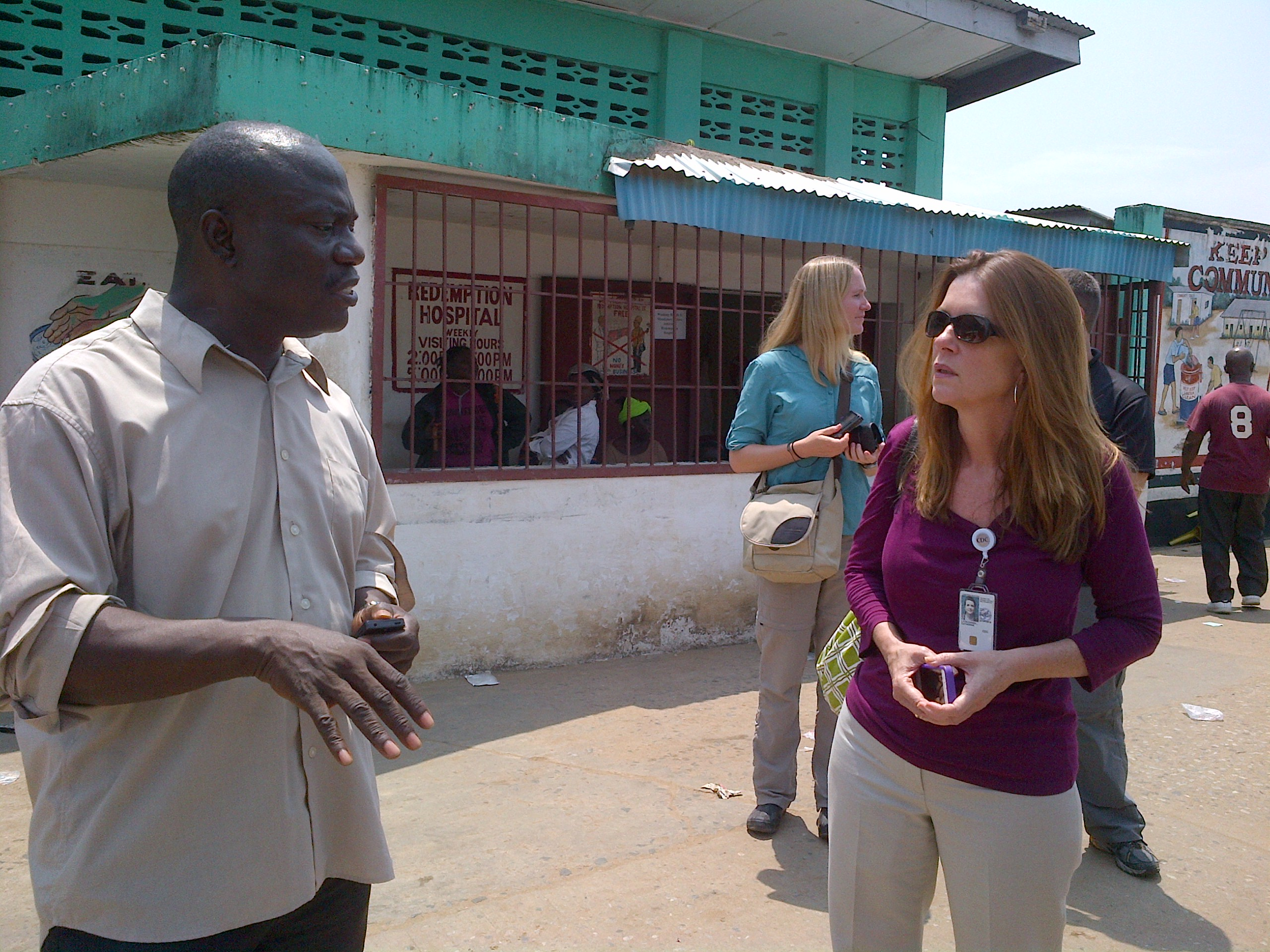
A CDC official consulting with a Liberian District representative about Ebola

=== Sanitation ===
Sanitation is a major struggle in most parts of Monrovia. There are four public toilets in the West Point area in Monrovia, an area with 70,000 inhabitants. The beach and river surrounding West Point area are often used as a lavatory. The Mesurado River is a source of drinking water, and the fish from the water are a primary source of food for many.

=== Corruption ===
It has been reported that body-collection teams, dispatched to collect the body of a suspected Ebola death, accepted bribes to issue falsified death certificates to family members. Due to the stigma of Ebola some families did not want to admit that their relative died from Ebola. The body of the deceased would then be left with relatives for a traditional funeral.

During the 10-day Liberian government quarantine of the West Point slum in Monrovia, residents were able to leave the quarantine area by bribing soldiers and police officers. A journalist inside West Point told a local radio station that Liberian soldiers and police were seen "daily soliciting monies from those being quarantined in the area to escape". The journalist reported that "many of those even suspected of having the disease were given free passage to leave West Point for Monrovia city center." An American non-governmental organization journalist reported that Liberian police threatened arrest and demanded bribes in order for him to leave the MSF compound.

=== Hiding of Ebola infected and dead ===
In October, it was noted that many of the Ebola deaths and those dying were not being reported to health authorities. While the epidemic had been accelerating, the number of bodies being collected was falling. "Very, very few of those dying in the community are being brought forward," said Cokie van der Velde, who organized the collections of bodies with Médecins Sans Frontières.

Van der Velde announced that the main crematorium in Monrovia was running at full capacity in Monrovia. It was cremating 80 bodies at its mass pyre per day. In early October, the number of cremations drastically decreased to 30 or 40 per day. Van der Velde said, "That means they're being kept hidden and buried in secret". Traditional funeral rituals are a risk factor in the spread of Ebola, as the body is at its most contagious stage post-mortem.

By late October, it was reported that many beds in Liberian Ebola treatment centers were empty due to people no longer reporting suspected Ebola cases to health authorities. The assistant Liberian health minister announced at the time that an assessment of Ebola treatment units discovered that out of the 742 beds only 351 were occupied by patients. The non-reporting is believed to be due to a policy decision in August to cremate all bodies of suspected Ebola cases in Monrovia. Cremation was against local culture of a traditional burial. The cremation order came after people in Monrovia's neighborhoods resisted the burial of hundreds of Ebola victims near their homes.

=== Issues within government ===
On 6 August 2014, President Sirleaf, in an emergency announcement, informed absent government ministers and civil service leaders to return to their duties in Liberia. In late August Sirleaf dismissed 10 government officials, including deputy ministers in the central government who refused to return to work. The benefits and pay for nearly twenty other high-ranking officials who refused to return were halted.

In mid-November, President Sirleaf reshuffled the country's cabinet in response to widespread criticism of the government's heavy-handed yet ineffective response to the Ebola crisis. George Warner, previously the head of civil service, would replace Walter Gwenigale as health minister. Sirleaf commented Gwenigale had her "full confidence" and would continue as an adviser.

=== Transfusions of blood from Ebola survivors ===
A black market for the blood of Ebola survivors was reported in Liberia. Buyers of the blood hoped to gain immunity or recovery via a blood transfusion. These transfusions have been noted as posing a risk for the transmission of HIV/AIDS, malaria and other blood-borne diseases. "This has the potential to divert time and resources originally allocated to control Ebola", according to a US military report.

=== Local conspiracy theories ===
- The Liberian Observer, a major Liberian newspaper, has repeatedly published Ebola-related conspiracy theories. In September, it published an article claiming that Ebola and the AIDS virus are genetically modified organisms to be used as bio-weapons on Africans in an attempt to reduce Africa's population. In October, the story went viral on social media.
- In late October, it was reported that harassment of gay Liberians in Monrovia was occurring after some church leaders said that "God was angry with Liberians over corruption and immoral acts such as homosexuality, and that Ebola was a punishment". The harassment included car windows being smashed and some gay people being forced from their homes and into hiding.
- "The Ebola outbreak was sparked by a bewitched aircraft that crashed in a remote part of Sierra Leone, casting a spell over three West African countries – but a heavily alcoholic drink called bitter Kola can cure the virus."
- "Some members of the community thought it was a bad spirit, a devil or poisoning."
- At the beginning of the outbreak, many did not believe that the disease existed. "I thought it was a lie (invented) to collect money because at that moment I hadn't seen people affected in my community."

== Effects ==
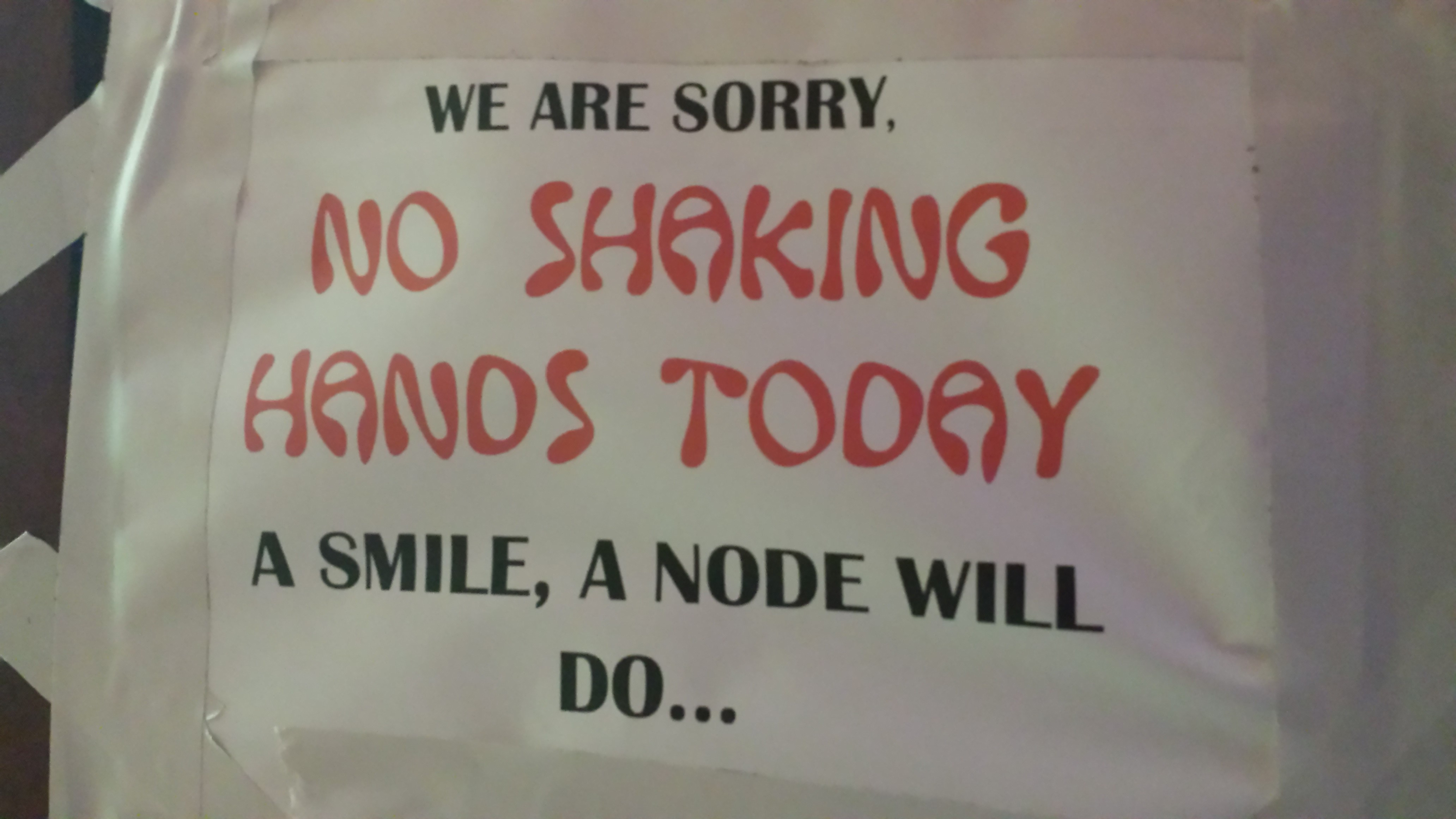
A sign in a Monrovia radio station advising people not to shake hands, as Ebola can be spread through physical contact via body fluids.

=== Evacuations ===
On 5 August 2014, the Brothers Hospitallers of St. John of God confirmed that Brother Miguel Pajares had been infected after volunteering in Liberia. The Spanish military assisted with his transfer on 6 August. Authorities stated he would be treated in the 'Carlos III' hospital in Madrid. This attracted controversy, amid questions as to the authorities' ability to guarantee no risk of transmission. Brother Pajares died from the virus on 12 August.

Kent Brantly, a physician and medical director in Liberia for the aid group Samaritan's Purse, and co-worker Nancy Writebol were infected while working in Monrovia. Both were flown to the United States at the beginning of August for further treatment. On 21 August, Brantly and Writebol recovered and were discharged.

A French volunteer health worker working for MSF in Liberia contracted Ebola there and was flown to France on 18 September 2014. French Health Minister Marisol Touraine stated the nurse would receive the experimental drug favipiravir. By 4 October she had recovered and was released from hospital.

After a news-network's cameraman came down with Ebola, he was evacuated to the U.S. and the rest of the crew also returned and went into quarantine.

=== Local works derived from the Ebola crisis ===
- "White Ebola", a political song by Mr. Monrovia, AG Da Profit and Daddy Cool, centered on the general mistrust of foreigners.
- "Ebola in Town", a dance tune by a group of West African rappers, D-12, Shadow and Kuzzy Of 2 Kings warns people of the dangers of the Ebola virus.
- Senegalese rapper Xuman parodied Rihanna's "Umbrella" in "Ebola est là" (Ebola Is Here). The song's lyrics warns locals that, "The disease is among our neighbours, Liberians and Guineans."
- "Ebola is Real", A hip hop tune done in collaboration with Liberian artists F.A., Soul Fresh, DenG, Adolphus Scott (a Liberian communication specialist for UNICEF) and Liberia's Ministry of Health & Social Welfare.
- A 5-minute public service advert was carefully crafted by Adolphus Scott and others, to increase general Ebola awareness. The clip runs an estimated 5 times a day on local TV stations.
- "State of Emergency", a hip hop tune by Tan Tan B and Quincy B, produced without government involvement.
- In August 2014, George Weah and Ghanaian musician Sidney produced a song to raise awareness about Ebola. All proceeds from the track been donated to the Liberian Health Ministry.
- Charles Yegba, leader of the AFROCO music group, plans to record a song and video to raise awareness about Ebola across Liberia.
- There were a number of Ebola-themed jokes circulating in West Africa.
- Liberian Radio programme directors have increased vernacular Ebola prevention programs' air time on 44 community radio stations to include most of the 30 minority languages used in the rural areas. Programmes of 30 minutes, 3 times a day, include commercials, phone-ins and news, broadcast in the local language. Only about 20% of Liberians understand English.

On 24 May 2016, Liberian Child's right and Environmental Activist, Chair-Person of the National Children and Youth Advisory Board Wantoe Teah Wantoe, acknowledged The United Nations body, Government body, and civil society actors at the World Humanitarian Summit through his Preliminary address on the need to contribute to Liberia's resilience and recovery after the casualties of the Ebola virus disease. He spoke of the vulnerabilities of Liberian children whose status had been changed to orphans and semi-orphans due to the deaths caused by the Ebola virus.

== See also ==
- Ebola virus epidemic in West Africa
- Ebola virus epidemic in Guinea
- Ebola virus epidemic in Sierra Leone
- Ebola virus disease in Mali
- Ebola virus disease in Nigeria
- Health in Liberia
- 2014 Ebola Virus in West Africa timeline of reported cases and deaths
- Fatu Kekula
