= E. S. Grant Mental Health Hospital =

Hospital in Monrovia, Montserrado, Liberia

Geography
- Location: Du Port Road, Paynesville, Monrovia, Liberia
- Coordinates: 6.315605°N 10.807372°W (Approximate)

Organisation
- Type: Specialist
- Affiliated university: University of Liberia A.M. Dogliotti School of Medicine

Services
- Speciality: Psychiatric hospital

Links
- Lists: Hospitals in Liberia

E. S. Grant Mental Health Hospital, in Monrovia, Liberia, is the sole psychiatric hospital in the Republic of Liberia. It is located on Du Port Road in the Paynesville community in Monrovia.

Prior to 2008, the hospital was a private hospital run by a German NGO, Cap Anamur. In 2008, it was absorbed into the public health system, to be administered by JFK Hospital.

The hospital had capacity for 80 inpatients. It also provides outpatient consultation, and groups for people who use substances .

As of 2019, the hospital was served by two psychiatrists. A psychiatry residency program was established in 2019, in collaboration with the University of Liberia A.M. Dogliotti School of Medicine. Psychiatry and family medicine residents spend time on their psychiatry rotations in the hospital.

== See also ==
- List of hospitals in Liberia
