= St. Martin's Catholic High School =

- Gbarnga, Bong County; Liberia

Information
- Religious affiliations: Roman Catholic, Congregation of Christian Brothers
- Opened: 2009 (reopened)
- Closed: 1989–2009
- Enrolment: 280 (2010)
- Athletics: Basketball, soccer, volleyball
- Alumni: Torchbearers

St. Martin's Catholic High School (SMS) is a Roman Catholic secondary school in Gbarnga, Liberia. It is sponsored by the Congregation of Christian Brothers, and is considered one of the best high schools in Bong County.

== History ==
During the First Liberian Civil War of 1989–1996 the school was forced to close. The class of 1990, with 49 students, was unable to graduate due to the growing unrest.

The school reopened in 2009, six years after the end of the Second Liberian Civil War, with the support of the Congregation of Christian Brothers and the Torchbearers, an association of former students who were supposed to graduate in 1990.

In 2010, for the first time in the school's history, the titles of valedictorian, salutatorian, and the third-place student were all female, out of 70 graduates. This was considered notable because in Liberia, only 35 percent of 12th-grade students were female at the time.

In the 2010s, the school began to struggle, mostly due to the effects of the West African Ebola virus epidemic of 2014–2015. This was augmented by a vocal outcry by parents of students enrolled at the school in 2013, who protested "exorbitant fees", saying that the school was exploiting them. The Christian Brothers, who sponsor the school, responded with a fundraising campaign under the auspices of Edmund Rice Development, a Christian Brothers organization. The Torchbearers, an alumni group, organized an online crowdfunding campaign to raise money for scholarships, describing the school as being in "dire straits". In addition, St Mary's College Preparatory School in Crosby, England, a Christian Brothers school, raised £1,300 for St. Martin's, which it said had an "uncertain future".

== Athletics ==
The school has basketball, soccer, and volleyball teams.

=== Basketball ===
The school's basketball team was an informal activity until the late 1960s, when members of the team asked Joe Jauregui, a foreign educator doing mission work, to be their coach. He agreed, and organized a more formal basketball program including games with teams from other schools in the area, including Gboveh High School, and W.V.S. Tubman Junior High School (named after William Tubman). The tournaments grew in popularity, but were discontinued after the outbreak of the First Liberian Civil War. In 2012, Liberian Youth and Sports Minister S. Tornorlah Varpilah, himself a St. Martin's alumni, reestablished the league tournaments. The tournaments once again grew immensely popular, and notable persons such as Vice President of Liberia Joseph Boakai have attended games.

== Notable alumni ==
- Michael Kpakala Francis – Roman Catholic Archbishop of Monrovia from 1981 to 2011
- Franklin Siakor – Liberian politician; Bong County junior senator, Senate of Liberia
- S. Tornorlah Varpilah – Liberian Youth and Sports Minister

=== Torchbearers ===
The Torchbearers are a group of alumni composed of members of the class of 1990 who were unable to graduate. In addition to helping reestablish the school in 2009, they also provide scholarships for students at the school.

== See also ==
- Education in Liberia
- List of schools in Liberia
- Religion in Liberia
- Roman Catholicism in Africa
