= St. Patrick's High School (Liberia) =

Defunct secondary school in Liberia

- Monrovia; Liberia

Information
- Established: 1936
- Closed: 1996

St. Patrick's High School was a high school in Monrovia, Liberia, from 1936 to 1996. It was one of the top secondary schools in the country.

== History ==
In 1934, after being appointed Vicar Apostolic of Liberia, Father John Collins founded the St. Patrick School in Monrovia for the benefit of local children under the auspices of the Society of African Missions. He was rejoined by Father Francis Carroll in 1936, and under their direction, the school extended to the secondary level in 1939.

In 1943, the school's first five graduates finished their scholarship, a first for a Catholic school in Liberia.

After Father John Collins died in 1961, Father Francis Carroll was consecrated Bishop of Monrovia, and one year later made the arrangements for the Brothers of Holy Cross to take over the management of St. Patrick's High School.

Maintaining a high profile for its excellent education, the school was closed for a time during the 1989 civil war. Two nuns, Sister Agnes and Sister Shirley, reopened the school. Both were killed in 1992 by National Patriotic Front of Liberia (NPFL) rebel leader Charles Taylor's forces during the continued strife.

The brothers then ran the school until April 6, 1996, when the hierarchy closed all Catholic facilities.

== Notable alumni ==
- Emmanuel Nyan Gbalazeh – Chief Justice, Supreme Court of Liberia.

== Principals ==
1. Father Francis Carroll (1936–)
2. Father Thomas Lakins
3. Father Joseph Guinan
4. Father Michael Rooney
5. Father O'Donovan
6. Brother Donald Allen
7. Brother Austin Maley
8. Brother Paul Clark
9. Brother John Zoglemann
10. Brother Edward Foken (1971–79, 1980–84)
11. Brother James Newberry (1982–89)
12. Sister Shirley Kolmer
13. Richard Goodlin - 1996

== See also ==
- Education in Liberia
- List of schools in Liberia
- Religion in Liberia
