= Gabriel Blamo Snosio Jubwe =

Liberian Roman Catholic prelate (born 1958)

The Most Reverend Gabriel Blamo Snosio Jubwe
- Archbishop of Monrovia, Liberia
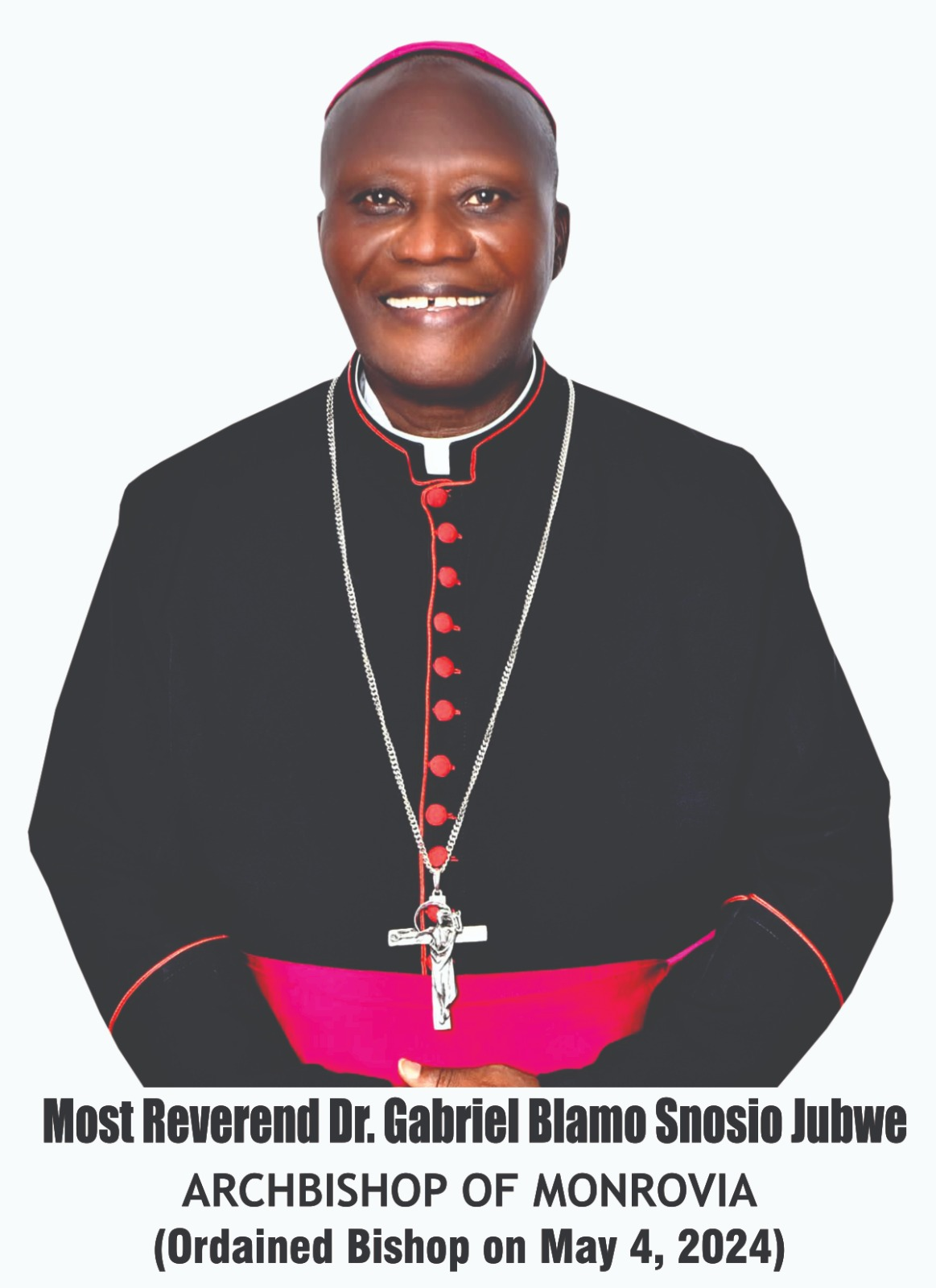
- Church: Catholic Church
- Archdiocese: Roman Catholic Archdiocese of Monrovia
- See: Monrovia
- Appointed: 28 February 2024
- Installed: 4 May 2024
- Predecessor: Lewis Jerome Zeigler
- Successor: Incumbent
- Other posts: Administrator of Monrovia, Liberia (1 October 2021 until 28 February 2024)

Orders
- Ordination: 18 December 1983
- Consecration: 4 May 2024 by Walter Erbì
- Rank: Archbishop

Personal details
- Born: Gabriel Blamo Snosio Jubwe; 7 September 1958 (age 67)
- Motto: "Unitas et pax in Christo" (Unity and peace in Christ)

Styles of Gabriel Blamo Snosio Jubwe
- Reference style: Your Grace; The Most Reverend
- Spoken style: His Grace
- Religious style: Archbishop

Gabriel Blamo Snosio Jubwe (born 7 September 1958) is a Liberian Roman Catholic prelate who is the Archbishop of the Roman Catholic Archdiocese of Monrovia, Liberia since February 2024. While still a priest, he was appointed Administrator of Monrovia from October 2021 until February 2024. He was appointed bishop by Pope Francis on 28 February 2024. He was consecrated at Monrovia, Archdiocese of Monrovia in Liberia on 4 May 2024.

== Background and education ==
He was born on 7 September 1958 to Liberian parents, in Lagos, Archdiocese of Lagos, Nigeria. He attended elementary and secondary schools in Nigeria. He studied philosophy and theology at the St. Paul's College Seminary in Gbarnga, Liberia, before he was ordained a priest in December 1983. He graduated with a Doctorate in Liturgy from the Pontifical Athenaeum of Saint Anselm, in Rome, Italy.

== Priest ==
He was ordained a priest of the Roman Catholic Archdiocese of Monrovia, Liberia on 18 December 1983. He served as priest until 28 February 2024.

After ordination, he served in various roles including as:

- Rector of the Sacred Heart Cathedral, Monrovia Archdiocese
- Vicar General, of the Archdiocese of Monrovia
- Secretary General of the Catholic Bishops Conference of Liberia,
- Director of the Pontifical Mission Societies in Liberia
- Rector of the Saint Paul Major Seminary in Gbarnga, Liberia
- Member of the College of Consultors of the Archdiocese of Monrovia, Liberia.
- Parish priest of Saint Pius X Parish in Monrovia, Archdiocese of Monrovia.
- While still a priest, The Very Reverend Monsignor Father Gabriel Blamo Snosio Jubwe was appointed Administrator of the Archdiocese of Monrovia from 1 October 2021 until 28 February 2024.

== Bishop ==
On 28 February 2024, Pope Francis appointed him as Archbishop of the Roman Catholic Archdiocese of Monrovia, Liberia. He was consecrated and installed at the Sacred Heart Cathedral, in Monrovia, Archdiocese of Monrovia on 4 May 2024. The Principal Consecrator was Archbishop Walter Erbì, Titular Archbishop of Nepete assisted by Archbishop Edward Tamba Charles, Archbishop of Freetown and Bishop Anthony Fallah Borwah, Bishop of Gbarnga.

== See also ==
- Catholic Church in Liberia

== Succession table ==
Catholic Church titles
Preceded by Lewis Jerome Zeigler (12 February 2011 - 7 June 2021)	Archbishop of Monrovia (since 28 February 2024)	Succeeded by Incumbent
