= List of schools in Liberia =

This is a list of notable schools in the African country of Liberia.

== Primary and secondary schools ==
Grand Cape Mount County

Masroor Ahmadiyya Senior High School, Tiene Town, Tewor District

=== Montserrado County ===
- Innovation Preparatory International Academy (IPREP)
- African Dream Academy
- Alexander B Cumming School
- American International School of Monrovia
- AM Fofana High School
- Best Brains Academy, Thinkers Village
- Bethesda Christian Mission School
- Elizabeth Crawford High School
- B. W. Harris Episcopal High School
- Christian Bible Faith Mission High school, Joe Bar, Paynesville
- Carolyn A.Miller High School, Bassa Town Community, Paynesville
- Christian Missionary Fellowship International Bilingual High school
- Carver Mission Academy, Paynesville
- Cyber-ed Christian School of Excellence
- College of West Africa
- Don Bosco Technical High School, Sinkor
- Drims School System, Paynesville
- Effort Baptist Church School, Paynesville
- ELWA Academy, Paynesville
- Haywood Mission Institute
- Heritage International Leadership Academy
- Isaac A David Memorial, Paynesville
- JJ Roberts United Methodist High School
- JW Harris Memorial
- JAHZJET Mission School
- Kendeja Highschool
- Levi C Williams
- Light International School System
- Our Lady of Grace International
- Paynesville Harvest Christian Academy, Paynesville City
- Paynesville Community School
- Ricks Institute
- Seventh Day Adventist High School
- Soltiamon Christian School System
- Spiritan Academy, Central Monrovia
- Sr Kathleen McGuire Memorial Catholic High School, ELWA
- St Kizito Catholic High School
- St Peter's Lutheran High School
- William VS Tubman High School

=== Margibi County ===
- Booker Washington Institute, Kakata
- Dolo Town Public School, Marshall
- Duazon Public School, Duazon
- Elizabeth Sele Mulbah Institute, Duazon
- Gbotee R Peabody Foundation, Duazon
- Harbel Multilateral High School
- John P Mitchell Public School
- Kakata Community College, Kakata City
- Liberia Renaissance Education Complex, Duazon
- Mid-Liberia Christian School System, Ben's Town, Marshall
- Sangbah E. Cole Memorial Elementary & Jr. High School

=== Gbarnga ===
- Gbarnga Lutheran Mission

=== Grand Bassa County ===
- Bassa High School
- Drims School System
- St Peter Claver Catholic High School

== Post-secondary institutions ==
- Adventist University of West Africa, Margibi County
- African Methodist Episcopal University, Montserrado County
- Bong County University, Bong County
- Booker Washington Institute, Kakata
- Cuttington University, Bong County
- Louis Arthur Grimes School of Law, Montserrado County
- Nimba County University College, Nimba County
- Bluecrest University, Montserrado County
- Starz University, Montserrado County
- Stella Maris Polytechnic, Montserrado County
- Tubman University, Maryland County
- United Methodist University, Montserrado County
- University of Liberia, Montserrado County

== See also ==
- Education in Liberia
- CENSIL University College
