= List of Catholic dioceses in Liberia =

The Roman Catholic Church in Liberia is composed of one ecclesiastical province with 2 suffragan dioceses.

== List of dioceses ==
=== Episcopal Conference of Liberia ===
==== Ecclesiastical Province of Monrovia ====
- Archdiocese of Monrovia
  - Diocese of Cape Palmas
  - Diocese of Gbarnga
