= AISM =

AISM may refer to:

- American International School of Medicine, Georgetown, Guyana
- American International School of Monrovia, Monrovia, Liberia
- American International School of Mozambique, Maputo, Mozambique
- Annals of the Institute of Statistical Mathematics
- Australian International School, Malaysia, Selangor, Malaysia
- Association Internationale de Signalisation Maritime
