= Anthony Fallah Borwah =

Liberian Catholic prelate (born 1966)

The Most Reverend Anthony Fallah Borwah
- Bishop of Gbarnga, Liberia
- Church: Catholic Church
- Archdiocese: Roman Catholic Archdiocese of Monrovia
- See: Roman Catholic Diocese of Gbarnga
- Appointed: 21 March 2011
- Installed: 11 June 2011
- Predecessor: Lewis Jerome Zeigler
- Successor: Incumbent

Orders
- Ordination: 15 September 1996
- Consecration: 11 June 2011 by Lewis Jerome Zeigler
- Rank: Bishop

Personal details
- Born: Anthony Fallah Borwah; 3 October 1966 (age 59) Wodu, Diocese of Gbarnga, Bong County, Liberia

Styles of Anthony Fallah Borwah
- Reference style: Your Lordship; The Most Reverend
- Spoken style: His Lordship
- Religious style: Bishop

Anthony Fallah Borwah (born 3 October 1966) is a Liberian Catholic prelate who is the bishop of the Roman Catholic Diocese of Gbarnga in Liberia, since 21 March 2011. Before that, from 15 September 1996, until he was appointed bishop, he was a priest of the Archdiocese of Monrovia. He was appointed bishop by Pope Benedict XVI. He was consecrated bishop and installed at Gbarnga on 11 June 2011.

== Background and education ==
He was born on 3 October 1966, in Wodu, Diocese of Gbarnga, Bong County, Liberia. He attended primary and secondary school near his home area. After secondary school, he studied at the Saint Kizito Seminary in Kenema, in Sierra Leone, "for the propaedeutics course", in 1987. He studies philosophy at Saint Paul's College = in Gbarnga, Liberia. He then transferred to the philosophical seminary in Makeni, Sierra Leone, where he graduated with a Bachelor's degree in 1994. He studied theology at Saint Peter's Regional Seminary, at Cape Coast, Ghana from 1995 until 1996. From 1998 until 2001, he studied at the Pontifical University of the Holy Cross in Rome where he graduated with a Licentiate in social communications.

== Priest ==
On 15 September 1996, he was ordained a priest for the Archdiocese of Monrovia at the Cathedral of Monrovia. He served as a priest until 21 March 2011. While a priest, he served in various roles and locations including as:

- Assistant parish priest of the Sacred Heart Cathedral, Monrovia from 1996 until 1997.
- Assistant parish priest of Saint Peter Claver Parish, Buchanan from 1997 until 1998.
- Studies in Rome at the Pontifical University of the Holy Cross, leading to the award of a licentiate in social communications, from 1998 until 2001.
- Parish priest of Christ the King Parish, Monrovia from 2001 until 2005.
- Parish priest of Saint Anthony Parish, Gardnersville, Monrovia from 2005 until 2009.
- Director of the Archdiocesan Catholic Media Center, Monrovia from 2001 until 2011.
- Speaker for the Episcopal Conference of Liberia (CABICOL) from 2002 until 2011.
- Professor of Philosophy at the University of Liberia from 2004 until 2011.
- Administrator of the Sacred Heart Cathedral, Monrovia from 2009 until 2011.

== Bishop ==
On 21 March 2011, Pope Benedict XVI appointed Reverend Father Anthony Fallah Borwah of the clergy of Monrovia, previously Professor of Philosophy at the University of Liberia and Administrator of the Sacred Heart Cathedral in Monrovia, as the new Bishop of the Diocese of Gbarnga, in Liberia.

He was consecrated bishop on 11 June 2011 by Lewis Jerome Zeigler, Archbishop of Monrovia assisted by George Antonysamy, Titular Archbishop of Sulci and Andrew Jagaye Karnley, Bishop of Cape Palmas. While bishop at Gbarnga, Bishop Anthony Fallah Borwah served as the President of the Catholic Bishops' Conference of Liberia (CABICOL) in the early 2020s.

== See also ==
- Catholic Church in Liberia

== Succession table ==
Catholic Church titles
Preceded by Lewis Jerome Zeigler (30 May 2002 - 11 July 2009)	Bishop of Gbarnga (since 21 March 2011)	Succeeded by Incumbent
