= Tubman family (Liberia) =

Liberian political family

The Tubman family is a prominent Americo-Liberian family from Harper, Liberia. The family is descended from African American slaves, the Tubmans who were owned by a prominent Maryland family. The Tubman family has produced notable Liberians such as William Tubman and Winston Tubman.
