= Apostolic Nunciature to Gambia =

Diplomatic post of the Holy See

The Apostolic Nunciature to Gambia is an ecclesiastical office of the Catholic Church in Gambia. It is a diplomatic post of the Holy See, whose representative is called the Apostolic Nuncio with the rank of an ambassador. The title Apostolic Nuncio to Gambia is held by the prelate appointed Apostolic Nuncio to Liberia; he resides in Liberia.

== List of papal representatives to Gambia ==
Apostolic Pro-Nuncios

- Johannes Dyba (25 August 1979 - 1 June 1983)
- Romeo Panciroli (6 November 1984 - 18 March 1992)
- Luigi Travaglino (7 November 1992 - 2 May 1995)

Apostolic Nuncios

- Antonio Lucibello (8 September 1995 - 27 July 1999)
- Alberto Bottari de Castello (18 December 1999 - 1 April 2005)
- George Antonysamy (4 August 2005 - 21 November 2012)
- Mirosław Adamczyk (8 June 2013 - 12 August 2017)
- Dagoberto Campos Salas (17 August 2018 – 14 May 2022)
- Walter Erbi (30 November 2022 - 1 July 2026)
