= Javier Domingo Fernández González =

Venezuelan Roman-Catholic priest

Reverend Javier Domingo Fernández González
- Apostolic Nuncio to Liberia and Sierra Leone; Titular Archbishop-elect of Diana
- Appointed: 21 November 2026
- Predecessor: Walter Erbì
- Other post: Titular Archbishop-elect of Diana

Orders
- Ordination: 21 July 2001

Personal details
- Born: 7 July 1973 (age 53) Caracas, Venezuela

Javier Domingo Fernández González (born 7 July 1973) is a Venezuelan prelate of the Catholic Church who works in the diplomatic service of the Holy See.

== Biography ==
Javier Domingo Fernández González was born on 7 July 1973 in Caracas, Venezuela. He was ordained a priest for the Archdiocese of Caracas on 21 July 2001.

He holds a Doctorate in Theology from the Pontifical Gregorian University in Rome and a Doctorate in Canon Law from the San Dámaso Ecclesiastical University in Madrid

== Diplomatic career ==
Fernández González entered the Holy See Diplomatic Service on 1 July 2007, and served in the apostolic nunciatures in the Central African Republic, Spain, Nigeria and India, and at the Secretariat of State, first in the Section for Relations with States and International Organizations, and then in the Section for General Affairs, as head of Protocol.

On 21 November 2026, Pope Leo XIV appointed him Titular Archbishop of Diana and Apostolic Nuncio to Liberia and Sierra Leone. He is scheduled to be consecrated as an archbishop on a date TBD.

== See also ==
- List of heads of the diplomatic missions of the Holy See
