= Apostolic Nunciature to Sierra Leone =

Diplomatic mission of the Holy See in Africa

The Apostolic Nunciature to Sierra Leone is an ecclesiastical office of the Catholic Church in Sierra Leone. It is a diplomatic post of the Holy See, whose representative is called the Apostolic Nuncio with the rank of an ambassador. The title Apostolic Nuncio to Sierra Leone is held by the prelate appointed Apostolic Nuncio to Liberia; he resides in Liberia.

== List of papal representatives to Sierra Leone ==
Apostolic Delegates

- Johannes Dyba (25 August 1979 - 1 June 1983)
- Romeo Panciroli (6 November 1984 - 18 March 1992)
- Luigi Travaglino (4 April 1992 - 2 May 1995)
- Antonio Lucibello (8 September 1995 - 27 July 1999)

Apostolic Nuncios

- Alberto Bottari de Castello (18 December 1999 - 1 April 2005)
- George Antonysamy (20 September 2005 - 21 November 2012)
- Mirosław Adamczyk (21 September 2013 - 12 August 2017)
- Dagoberto Campos Salas (17 November 2018 – 14 May 2022)
- Walter Erbì (20 July 2022 – 1 July 2026)
- Javier Domingo Fernández González (21 November 2026 – present)
