= Andrew J. Karnley =

Liberian Catholic prelate (born 1967)

The Most Reverend Andrew Jagaye Karnley
- Bishop of Cape Palmas, Liberia
- Church: Catholic Church
- Archdiocese: Roman Catholic Archdiocese of Monrovia
- See: Roman Catholic Diocese of Cape Palmas
- Appointed: 5 January 2011
- Installed: 30 April 2011
- Predecessor: Boniface Nyema Dalieh

Orders
- Ordination: 9 July 1995
- Consecration: 30 April 2011 by George Antonysamy
- Rank: Bishop

Personal details
- Born: Andrew Jagaye Karnley; 29 April 1967 (age 58); Jawajeh, Bomi County, Liberia

Styles of Andrew Jagaye Karnley
- Reference style: Your Lordship; The Most Reverend
- Spoken style: His Lordship
- Religious style: Bishop

Andrew Jagaye Karnley (born 29 April 1967) is a Liberian prelate of the Roman Catholic Church. Since 2011, he has been the Bishop of Cape Palmas, a diocese with its seat in Harper. He was previously Apostolic Administrator of the Archdiocese of Monrovia from 2005 to 2011.

== Biography ==
Karnley was born in Bomi County on 29 April 1967 to Samuel and Hawa (Sandoin) Karnley. He attended his parish's Catholic school and Our Lady of Fatima High School in Cape Palmas. Zoé studied at Pope John XXIII Minor Seminary from 1982 to 1986. Later he completed his philosophy studies at the Major Seminary of Gbarnga and his theology studies at the Major Seminary of Cape Coast in Ghana. He was ordained to the priesthood on 9 July 1995.

He was vicar of Our Lady of Lourdes Parish from 1995 to 1996; Vice-Rector and then Rector of the Queen of Apostles Minor Seminary of Monrovia from 1996 to 1998; parish priest of the Immaculate Conception Parish in Monrovia from 1998 to 2000; and Rector of the St. Charles Lwanga Pre-Major Seminary Seminary from 2000 to 2005.

In February 2005, he was appointed Apostolic Administrator of the Archdiocese of Monrovia after Archbishop Michael Kpakala Francis suffered a severe stroke. His term as apostolic administrator ended with the appointment of Bishop Lewis Zeigler of Gbarnga as Bishop Coadjutor on 11 July 2009. From 2009 to 2011 Karnley studied church history in Rome at the Pontifical Gregorian University.

Pope Benedict XVI appointed him Bishop of Cape Palmas on 5 January 2011. He received his episcopal consecration on 30 April at St. Theresa's Cathedral (Harper) in the presence of archbishops from Ghana, the Ivory Coast, Nigeria, and Sierra Leone.
