= Catholic Church in Liberia =

The Catholic Church in Liberia is part of the worldwide Catholic Church, under the spiritual leadership of the Pope in Rome.

In 2020, there were approximately 348,000 Catholics in Liberia (7.52% of the population). There are 3 dioceses including 1 archdiocese:

- Monrovia
  - Cape Palmas (located in Harper, Maryland County)
  - Gbarnga (located in Gbargna, Bong County)

Lewis Jerome Zeigler was the archbishop until 2021; in 2023, the seat is vacant.

== History ==
=== Background ===
At the beginning of the 20th century, the Americo-Liberian settlers were to be found on the seacoast and at the mouths of the two most important rivers. Of the native tribes, the principal are the Veys, the Pessehs, the Barlines, the Bassas, the Kru, the Grebo, and the Mandingos. The converts came chiefly from the Kru and the Grebo. Methodist, Baptist, Presbyterians, and Episcopalian missions had been established in the country for many years with scant results at the beginning of the 19th century.

=== First American mission to Liberia ===
As a number of the first American colonists were Catholics from Maryland and the adjoining states, they eventually caught the attention of the Congregation for the Evangelization of Peoples and the second Provincial Council of Baltimore in 1833 undertook to meet the difficulty of sending missionaries to serve the local faithful. In accordance with the measures taken, Rev. Edward Barron, Vicar-General of Philadelphia, Rev. John Kelly of New York, and Denis Pindar, a lay catechist from Baltimore, volunteered for the mission and sailed for Africa from Baltimore on 2 December 1841. They arrived there safe and Father Barron serve the first Mass at Cape Palmas on 10 February 1842. After a time, finding that he did not receive missionaries enough to accomplish anything practical, Father Barron returned to the United States, and thence went to Rome where he was made on 22 January 1842, Vicar Apostolic of the Two Guineas, and titular Bishop of Constantia.

=== Missionary takeover of religious congregations ===
With seven priests of the Congregation of the Holy Ghost, he returned to Liberia, arriving at Cape Palmas on 30 November 1843. Five of these priests died on the mission of fever, to which Denis Pindar, the lay catechist, also fell a victim, on 1 January 1844. Bishop Barron and Father Kelly held out for two years, and then, wasted by fever, they determined to return to the United States, feeling that it was impossible to withstand the climate any longer. Bishop Barron died of yellow fever during an epidemic at Savannah, Georgia, on 12 September 1854, and Father Kelly died at Jersey City, New Jersey, on 28 April 1866.

The Fathers of the Holy Ghost, who took up the work, were also forced by the climate to abandon it in a couple of years, and the permanent mission lapsed until 25 February 1884. The Fathers of Montfort (Company of Mary), under Fathers Blanchet and Lorber, then laid the foundation of another mission at Monrovia. The President of the Republic, Mr. Johnson, and the people generally gave them a cordial welcome, because of its emphasis on providing a thorough education, but the sectarian ministers organized a cabal against them, and endeavoured to thwart all their efforts to spread the Catholic faith. They made some progress in spite of this, and in the following year, having received reinforcements from France, opened a school for boys and extended their operations into other places. Father Bourzeix learned the native language, in which he compiled a catechism and translated a number of hymns. Deaths among the missionaries and the health of the others shattered by fever forced these priests also to abandon the Liberia mission. After this it was visited occasionally by missionaries from Sierra Leone until 1906, when the Congregation for the Evangelization of Peoples handed its care over to the Society of African Missions from Lyon, and three Irish priests, Fathers Stephen Kyne, Joseph Butler, and Dennis O'Sullivan, with two French assistants, continued to work among the 2800 Catholics the vicariate was estimated to contain in 1910.

Diplomatic relations between the Holy See and Liberia were established in 1927, celebrated by a spectacular and massive march through the streets of Monrovia on the feast of Christ the King, which subsequently boosted registration in Catholic schools and a lasting foundation of Catholicism.

== Outspokenness during the dictatorships ==
Under the dictatorships of William Tubman up to Samuel Doe, the Catholic Church continued its work in education and with the poor, as well as using its voice to denounce abuses and corruption under the different dictatorial regimes. The Catholic Church was seen as more trustworthy than other churches because its peculiar mode of financing and hierarchy did not leave it at the government's mercy. Its financing came "predominantly from giant German agencies which would simply cease contributing if previous grants were not scrupulously accounted for." Because it did not include high-ranking government officials, and because of the Catholic episcopal authority (prelates were not elected for just a few years), the Church benefited from a great freedom of expression, which it used wisely to denounce the government when necessary, using "machinery for public comment on national issues" with the Lenten or Advent Pastoral Letters. Archbishop Michael Kpakala Francis in his first letter written in 1977, denounced corruption in these words:

"It is not too late to stop this ugly trend of corruption in our country. We are proud to call ourselves Christian, but can we honestly do so if corrupt practices are the normal things in our lives?"

— First Pastoral Letter of Archbishop Francis, 1977

The Catholic Church also used its voice to condemn the systematic recourse to violence for political ends in Liberia. For instance, after Samuel Doe's coup in 1980, the Catholic Bishops were quick in bringing out a statement on "The Liberian Situation", emphasizing the role of the Church in the country's political life, "without usurping the role of the State and without favouring any party." The bishops reminded the State of its duty to protect and not breach the citizens' rights. The statement declared that:

"Violence has no place in a just government. Violence destroys the very fabric of society, foments hatred and brings about hostility where there should be love"

— Catholic Bishops Pastoral Letter on "The Liberian Situation", 1980

== Civil war and aftermath ==
During the 1989–1997 Liberian Civil War, many churches and religious centres were used as shelters. Priests and religious were also the target of violence and many were killed. The Catholic Church in Liberia has on many occasions renewed its appeal for a War Crimes Court to be set up, "in an effort to enhance the justice system against individuals who commit atrocities against Liberians", as reconciliation must come with justice.

== Involvement in the fight against AIDS ==
In 2009, as part of its effort "to complement government and global efforts to create an increased awareness on the prevention of the HIV and AIDS pandemic", the Catholic Heath Secretariat of the Diocese of Gbarnga in Liberia renewed the local Church's commitment and perseverance by organizing "intense HIV/AIDs awareness and sensitization campaigns in Bong County".

== See also ==
- Religion in Liberia
