= Holy Spirit Cathedral, Gbarnga =

Holy Spirit Cathedral
- Holy Spirit Cathedral
- 6.99366°N 9.46784°W
- Location: Gbarnga
- Country: Liberia
- Denomination: Roman Catholic Church

The Holy Spirit Cathedral or simply Cathedral of Gbarnga, is a religious building that is located in Gbarnga the second largest city in the African country of Liberia, in the Bong County, northeast of Monrovia city.

It is the seat of the Diocese of Gbarnga (Dioecesis Gbarnganus) which was created in November 1986 by decision of Pope John Paul II by Bula De Monroviensi. Follow the Roman or Latin rite and is under the pastoral responsibility of the Bishop Anthony Fallah Borwah.

== See also ==
- Roman Catholicism in Liberia
- Holy Spirit Cathedral
