= Boniface Nyema Dalieh =

- Bishop of Cape Palmas
- Church: Catholic Church
- Diocese: Diocese of Cape Palmas
- In office: December 17, 1973 – October 15, 2008
- Predecessor: Patrick Kla Juwle
- Successor: Andrew J. Karnley
- Previous post: Titular Bishop of Talaptula (1973-1981)

Orders
- Ordination: July 11, 1965 by Nicholas Grimley
- Consecration: March 17, 1974 by Thomas Joseph Brosnahan

Personal details
- Born: December 9, 1933 Pleebo, Maryland County, Liberia
- Died: April 25, 2014 (aged 80)

Boniface Nyema Dalieh (December 9, 1933 – April 25, 2014) was a Liberian Roman Catholic bishop.

Ordained to the priesthood in 1965, he was named the Vicar Apostolic of Cape Palmas on December 17, 1973, and titular bishop of Talaptula. He received his episcopal consecration on March 17, 1974 from Thomas Joseph Brosnahan, with Francis Carroll and Anthony Saliu Sanusi as co-consecrators. On December 19, 1981, this Vicariate Apostolic was promoted as the Diocese of Cape Palmas, and Bishop Dalieh become the first diocesan bishop until retiring on October 15, 2008.
