= Apostolic Nunciature to Liberia =

Diplomatic post of the Holy See

The Apostolic Nunciature to Liberia is an ecclesiastical office of the Catholic Church in Liberia. It is a diplomatic post of the Holy See, whose representative is called the Apostolic Nuncio with the rank of an ambassador. The Apostolic Nuncio to Liberia is usually also the Apostolic Nuncio to Gambia and Sierra Leone upon his appointment to said nations. The nuncio resides in Monrovia.

== List of papal representatives to Liberia ==
Apostolic Internuncios

- John Collins, S.M.A. (12 July 1951 - 3 March 1961)
- Francis Carroll, S.M.A. (9 November 1961 - 25 August 1979)
  - Pro-Nuncio from 7 March 1966

Apostolic Pro-Nuncios

- Johannes Dyba (25 August 1979 - 1 June 1983)
- Romeo Panciroli (6 November 1984 - 18 March 1992)
- Luigi Travaglino (4 April 1992 - 2 May 1995)

Apostolic Nuncios

- Antonio Lucibello (8 September 1995 - 27 July 1999)

Apostolic Nuncios

- Alberto Bottari de Castello (18 December 1999 - 1 April 2005)
- George Antonysamy (4 August 2005 - 21 November 2012)
- Mirosław Adamczyk (13 February 2013 - 12 August 2017)
- Dagoberto Campos Salas (28 July 2018 – 14 May 2022)
- Walter Erbì (16 July 2022 – 1 July 2026)
- Javier Domingo Fernández González (21 November 2026 – present)
