= Stella Maris Polytechnic University =

Private university in Monrovia, Liberia

- School logo
- Motto: Latin: Sapientia, Eruditio et Scientiae ad Officium
- Motto in English: "Wisdom, Knowledge & Skills for Service"
- Type: Private
- Established: 1988; 38 years ago
- Affiliations: Association of African Universities; Roman Catholic Archdiocese of Monrovia
- Religious affiliation: Catholic
- Chancellor: Lewis Jerome Zeigler
- President: Rosaline Y. T. Doe (acting)
- Students: 2,308 (2021)
- Location: Monrovia, Liberia; 6.2978°N 10.7939°W
- Campus: Urban
- Website: smpu.edu.lr

Stella Maris Polytechnic University (SMPU) is a private university in Monrovia, Liberia. Founded in 1988, the school is owned and operated by the Roman Catholic Archdiocese of Monrovia. Located on Capitol Hill, the school has approximately 2,300 students. The school is recognized by Liberia's National Commission on Higher Education as an approved baccalaureate granting school of higher learning, and is a member of the Association of African Universities.

== History ==
The school traces its history back to the Arthur Barclay Vocational Institute that had its roots in a donation of land to the church in 1972. Eventually the planned school was renamed as the Arthur Barclay Technical Institute and first held classes in February 1979. Catholic leaders then considered starting a Catholic college beginning in 1985, which eventually led to the establishment of Don Bosco Polytechnic. That school included Arthur Barclay Technical Institute which then became the Arthur Barclay Technical Institute.

The larger institution was chartered by the Liberian Legislature on August 15, 1988. Due to civil strife in the country, Don Bosco did not begin operating until 1993 when the Mother Patern College of Health Sciences opened. Then in January 1997 the school's board resolved to open the larger institution, which occurred in November of that year. Don Bosco Polytechnic was then renamed as Stella Maris Polytechnic in 2005.

In May 2007, Ireland's troops serving as part of the United Nations Mission in Liberia donated 21 computers as well as a large container of books to the SMP. As of 2009, the school had 2,090 students enrolled. Of those, 1,324 were men and 766 were women. In May 2010, the school's debate team won IBI International's inter-collegiate debate competition for Liberia. SMP beat out a total of six other schools, including African Methodist Episcopal University in the final round. In May 2011, SMP students prevented classes from being held in protest of a proposed tuition hike from US$5 to $7 per credit, as well as a proposed exit examination that would be required to graduate.
