= Mirosław Adamczyk =

Polish prelate of the Catholic Church (born 1962)

His Excellency, The Most Reverend Mirosław Adamczyk
- Apostolic Nuncio of Albania
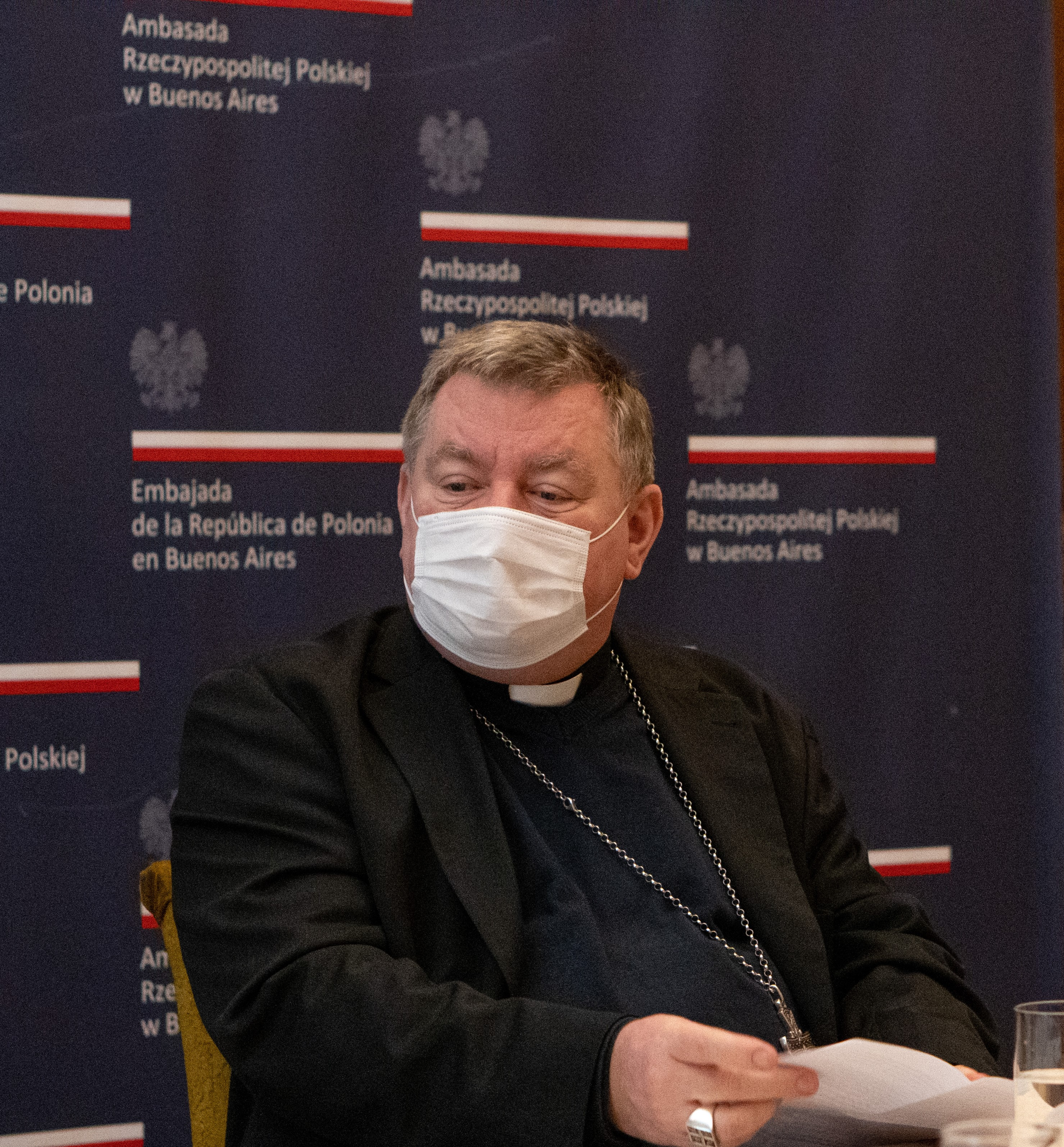
- Adamczyk in 2021
- Appointed: 14 January 2026
- Predecessor: Luigi Bonazzi
- Other post: Titular Archbishop of Otricoli
- Previous posts: Apostolic Nuncio to Argentina (2020–2026); Apostolic Nuncio to Panama (2017–2020); Apostolic Nuncio to Liberia, Gambia, and Sierra Lione (2013–2017)

Orders
- Ordination: 16 May 1987 by Tadeusz Gocłowski
- Consecration: 27 April 2013 by Kazimierz Cardinal Nycz; Sławoj Leszek Głódź; Savio Hon Tai-fai

Personal details
- Born: 16 July 1962 (age 63) Gdańsk, Poland
- Motto: Spes Autem Non Confundit
- Coat of arms

Styles of Mirosław Adamczyk
- Reference style: His Excellency; The Most Reverend
- Spoken style: Your Excellency
- Religious style: Archbishop

Mirosław Adamczyk (born 16 July 1962) is a Polish prelate of the Catholic Church who has worked in the diplomatic service of the Holy See since 1993, with the title of apostolic nuncio since 2013.

== Biography ==
Mirosław Adamczyk was born on 16 July 1962 in Gdańsk. He was ordained a priest for the Archdiocese of Gdańsk on 16 May 1987.

== Diplomatic career ==
He earned a degree in canon law and joined the diplomatic service of the Holy See on 1 July 1993. His early assignments took him to Madagascar, India, Hungary, Belgium, South Africa, and Venezuela.

On 22 February 2013, Pope Benedict XVI appointed him Apostolic Nuncio to Liberia and Titular Archbishop of Otricoli. He received his episcopal consecration from Cardinal Kazimierz Nycz on 27 April in the Cathedral of Oliwa.

Later in the year, Pope Francis gave him additional responsibilities as Apostolic Nuncio to the Gambia on 8 June and to Sierra Leone on 21 September.

On 12 August 2017, Pope Francis appointed him Apostolic Nuncio to Panama.

On 22 February 2020, Pope Francis appointed him Apostolic Nuncio to Argentina.

On 14 January 2026, Pope Leo XIV appointed him Apostolic Nuncio to Albania.

== See also ==
- List of heads of the diplomatic missions of the Holy See
