= John Collins (nuncio) =

John Collins S.M.A.
- Apostolic Internuncio to Liberia
- Church: Catholic Church
- In office: 12 July 1951 – 3 March 1961
- Predecessor: Position established
- Successor: Francis Carroll
- Other post: Titular Bishop of Thala (1934-1961)
- Previous posts: Vicar Apostolic of Monrovia (1950-1960); Vicar Apostolic of Liberia (1934-1950); Prefect of Liberia (1932-1934)

Orders
- Ordination: 15 June 1913 by Robert Browne
- Consecration: 30 September 1934 by Daniel Cohalan

Personal details
- Born: 21 August 1889 Leap, County Cork, United Kingdom of Great Britain and Ireland
- Died: 3 March 1961 (aged 71) Monrovia, Liberia

John Collins, S.M.A. (21 August 1889 – 3 March 1961) was an Irish prelate of the Catholic Church who worked as a missionary in Liberia for 47 years. He became a bishop in Liberia in 1934 and the diplomatic representative of the Holy See there from 1951 to 1961.

== Biography ==
John Collins was born on 21 August 1889 in Leap, County Cork, Ireland, the eighth of ten children. He studied in Irish seminaries and took his final vows as a member of the Society of African Missions on 31 October 1911. He was ordained a priest of the Society of African Missions on 15 June 1913 and began working in Liberia later that year.

Note: Beginning in 1932, Collins held a variety of titles in Liberia, and his title changed as the ecclesiastical jurisdiction changed, evolving from the Prefecture of Liberia, to the Vicariate of Liberia, to the Vicariate of Monrovia, and after Collins's death to the Archdiocese of Monrovia.

On 26 February 1932, Pope Pius XI appointed him Apostolic Prefect of Liberia. He was also given the diplomat's title of chargé d'affaires that year.

On 9 April 1934, the day the Prefecture became a Vicariate, Pope Pius appointed Collins titular bishop of Thala and Vicar Apostolic of Liberia. He received his episcopal consecration on 30 September 1934 from Bishop Daniel Cohalan of Cork.

He made fundraising trips to the United States in 1934, 1936, and 1950.

His title changed to Apostolic Vicar of Monrovia on 2 February 1950 with the change in the name of the vicariate.

On 12 July 1951, Pope Pius XII named him Apostolic Internuncio to Liberia.

His service as Vicar of Monrovia ended upon the appointment of his successor, Francis Carroll, on 20 December 1960.

He was still internuncio when he died from pneumonia in Monrovia on 3 March 1961 at the age of 71. The government set a mourning period of fifteen days. He was given a state funeral and President William Tubman delivered the principal eulogy.
