= Diocese of Gbarnga =

Roman Catholic diocese in Liberia

Coordinates: 6.9937°N 9.4677°W

Diocese of Gbarnga Dioecesis Gbarnganus

Location
- Country: Liberia
- Metropolitan: Monrovia

Statistics
- Area: 34,100 km^{2} (13,200 sq mi)
- Population: Total; Catholics: (as of 2004); 970,000; 14,300 (1.5%)

Information
- Rite: Latin Rite

Current leadership
- Pope: Leo XIV
- Bishop: Anthony Fallah Borwah

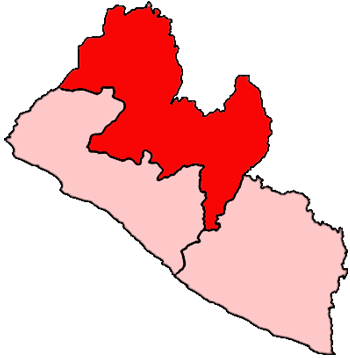

The Roman Catholic Diocese of Gbarnga (Latin: Gbarngan(us)) is a diocese located in the city of Gbarnga in the ecclesiastical province of Monrovia in Liberia. It was erected on 17th November, 1986.

== History ==
- November 17, 1986: Established as Diocese of Gbarnga from the Metropolitan Archdiocese of Monrovia

== Leadership ==
- Bishops of Gbarnga (Roman rite)
  - Bishop Benedict Dotu Sekey (1986.11.17 – 2000.12.13)
  - Bishop Lewis Jerome Zeigler (2002.05.30 — 2009.07.11), appointed Coadjutor Archbishop of Monrovia
  - Bishop Anthony Fallah Borwah (since 21 March 2011)

== See also ==
- Catholic Church in Liberia

== Sources ==
- GCatholic.org
- Catholic Hierarchy
