= Maryland ritual killings =

Series of murders in Liberia in the 1970s

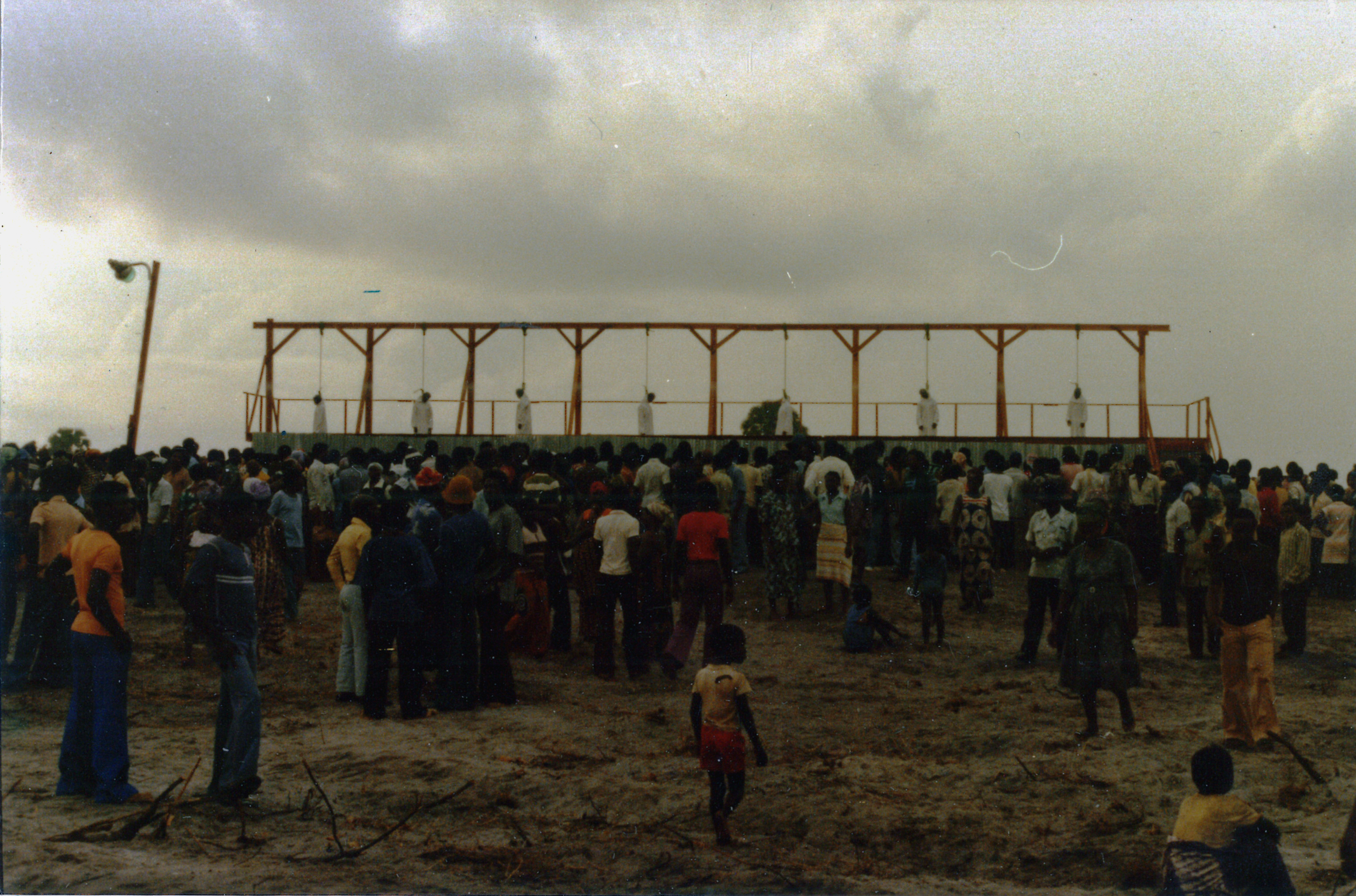
The public hanging of the Harper Seven on 16 February 1979

The Maryland ritual killings were a series of ritualistic murders that occurred around Harper, Maryland County, Liberia in the 1970s. The crimes have been regarded as "Liberia's most notorious ritual killing case" due to the number of murders, the involvement of high ranking government officials and their subsequent public executions.

== History ==
Between 1965 and 1977 over 100 murders occurred in Maryland County, many of which were considered ritualistic due to the mutilation and removal of body parts. During the 1970s, Liberians in Maryland County were constantly under the threat of ritual murders. Between November 1976 and July 1977, 14 people had disappeared in the county prompting Liberian president William Tolbert to fire Superintendent of Maryland County, James Daniel Anderson, who failed to report the missing people. Tolbert publicly declared "Anyone who kills deliberately: The law will kill that person".

These murders went unreported and uninvestigated until the murder of a local fisherman and popular singer, Moses Tweh. Tweh was abducted on June 26, 1977. His body was discovered on July 4, 1977, heavily mutilated with his eyes, ears, nose, tongue and penis removed. Prior to the discovery of Tweh's body, Wreh Taryonnoh, the girlfriend of Assistant Supervisor of Schools, Francis Nyepan, was allegedly heard by a group searching for Tweh saying that "if they would be so lucky to find him, only his bones they might see". This sparked the arrest of 12 people, a majority of whom were government officials.

== Arrests ==
In July and early August 1977, 12 people were arrested:

=== Executed ===
- James Daniel Anderson, Superintendent of Maryland County
- Allen Nathaniel Yancy, Representative for Maryland County, House of Representatives
- Francis Wlateh Nyepan, Assistant Supervisor of Schools
- Philip B. Seyton, Senior Inspector of the Ministry of Commerce, Maryland County
- Thomas Barclay, cook of Allen Yancy
- Wreh Taryonnoh, girlfriend of Francis Nyepan
- Putu Dueh

=== Died before execution ===
- Wonplu Boye, domestic servant for Francis Nyapan
- Kotee Weah, Chief Cook for the General Manager of the Firestone Company, Cavalla, Maryland County

=== Pardoned ===
- Tagbedi Wisseh, Acting Chief of Grandcess residents in Harper

=== Released ===
- Joshua W. Brown, Chief Security Officer, Liberia Sugar Company
- Teah Toby, Kru Governor

The accused were forced to walk through the street naked "carrying two buckets loaded with sand". They were allegedly tortured during interrogation.

== Trial ==
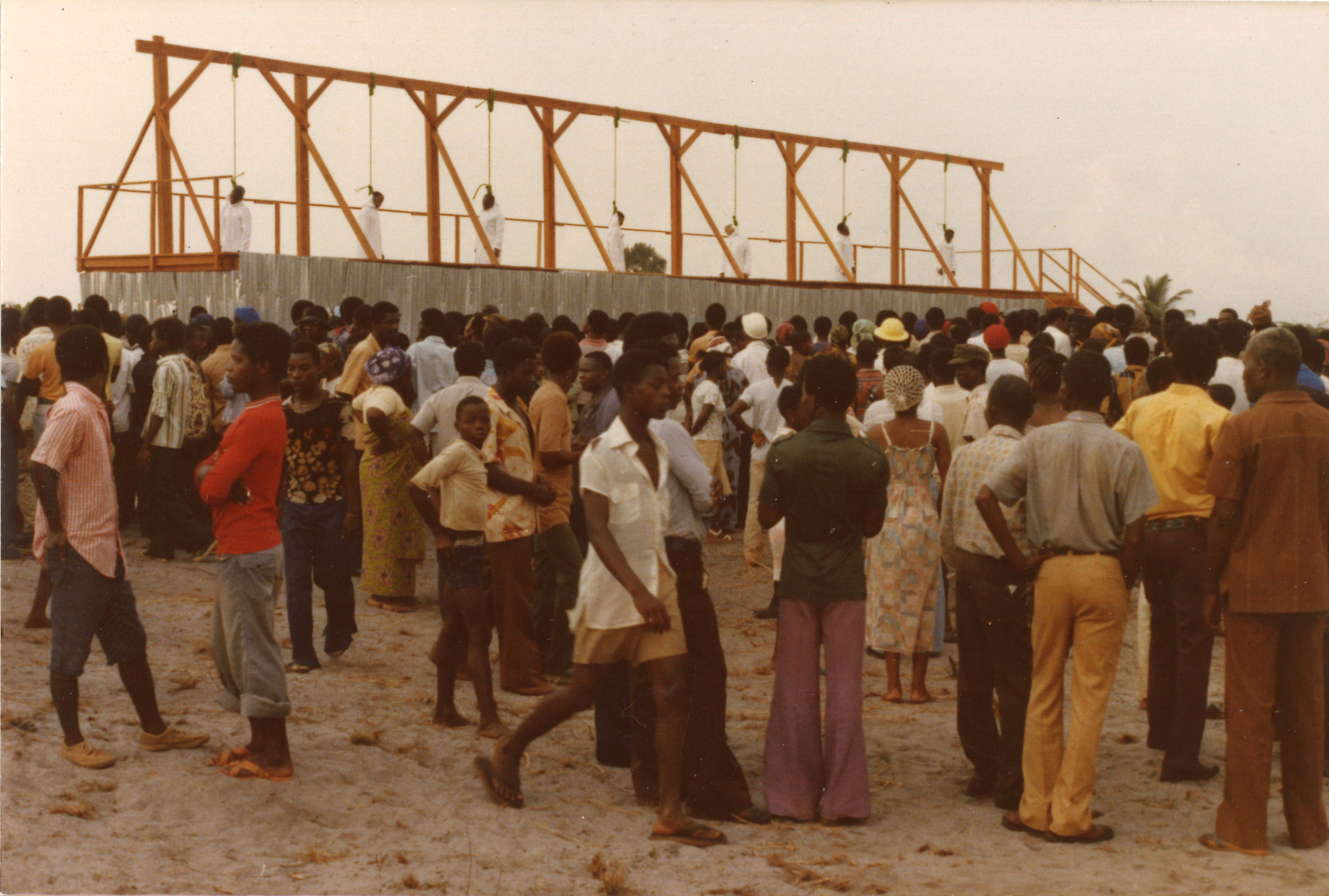
The Hanging of the Harper Seven, Liberia - 16 February 1979

During the first Harper Trial, Joshua Brown and Teah Toby were released and later became state witnesses. The other ten defendants were found guilty and sentenced to public execution by hanging. Tagbedi Wisseh appealed his conviction and was pardoned by Tolbert before execution. Wonplu Boye and Koti Weah both died before execution; it was rumored their own family members poisoned them to avoid shame.

Nonetheless, Tolbert, beleaguered, allowed the remaining executions to be carried out despite his party affiliation with the accused. Some authors have taken the success of the prosecution as evidence of an internal struggle within the True Whig Party, as Tolbert had been courting the support of newer non-urban and non-Americo-Liberian parts of the party over more established conservative elements as represented by the accused.

=== Execution ===
On 16 February 1979, the seven remaining people convicted of Moses Tweh's murder were publicly hanged at dawn in Harper. The media dubbed them the "Harper Seven".

== See also ==
- Crime in Liberia
