= Education in Liberia =

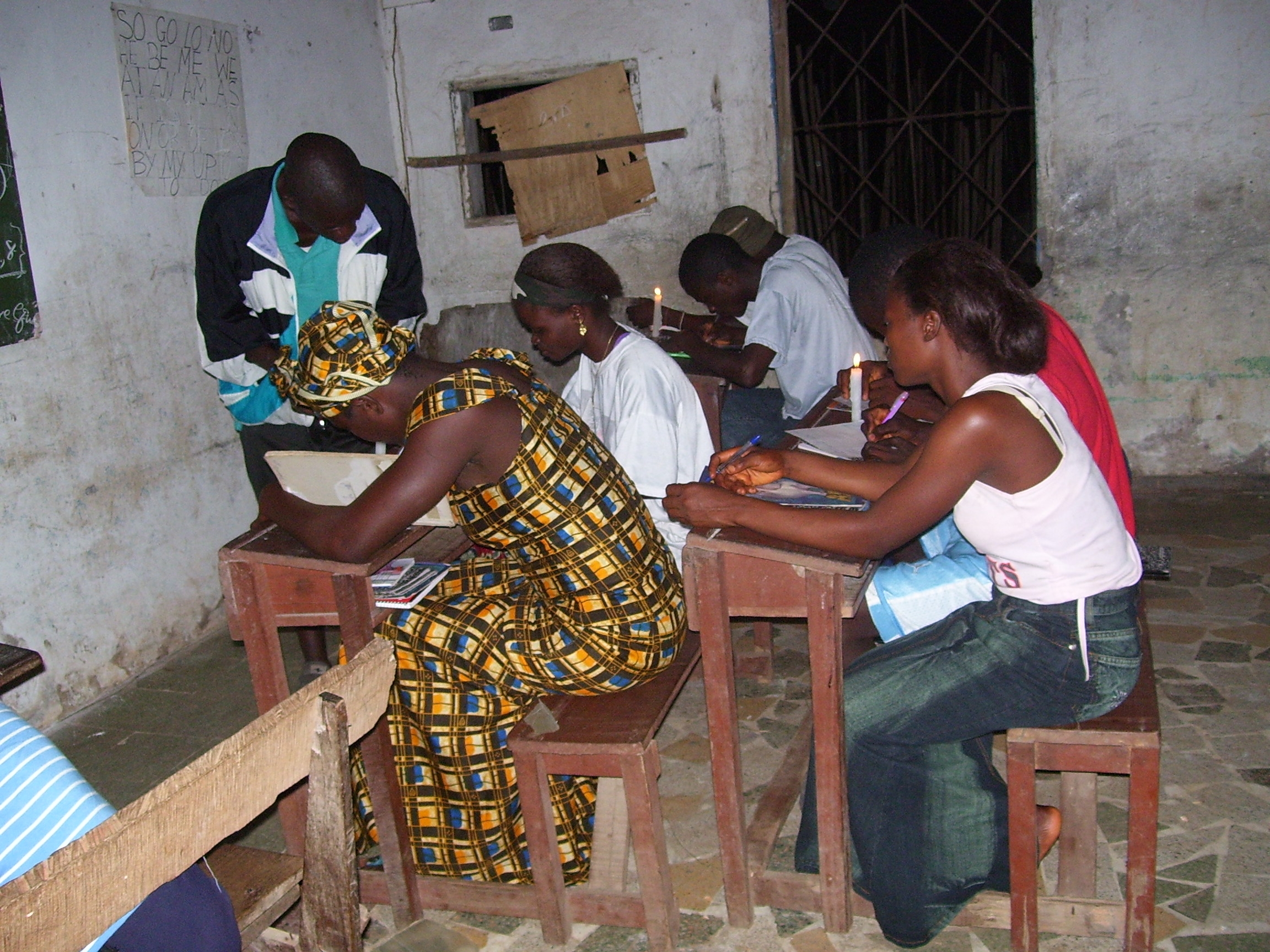
Students studying by candlelight in Bong County, Liberia.

Education in Liberia was severely affected by the First Liberian Civil War and Second Liberian Civil War, between 1989 and 2003. In 2010, the literacy rate of Liberia was estimated at 60.8% (64.80% for males and 56.8% for females).

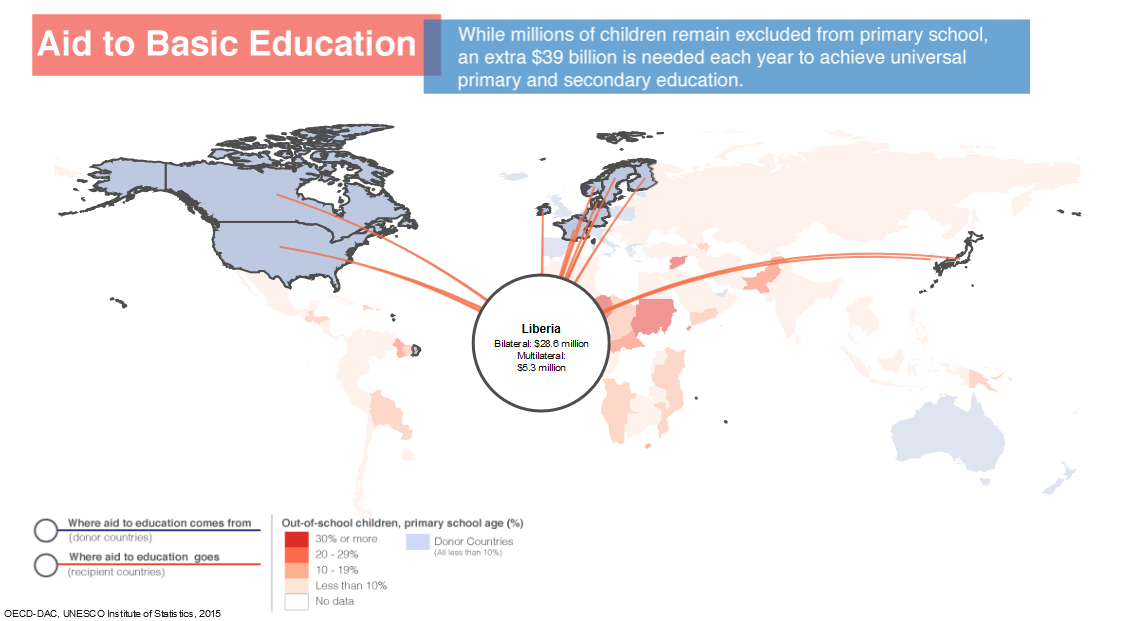
Aid to Basic Education, the amount of bilateral and multilateral aid contributed or received by Liberia (source: UNESCO)

Education in Liberia is free for primary students attending a government school, but most of these schools lack adequate learning facilities. Most parents prefer sending their kids to private schools, which are often very expensive for the average Liberian.

The country operates on a 6-3-3 system.

The Human Rights Measurement Initiative (HRMI) finds that Liberia is fulfilling only 35.9% of what it should be fulfilling for the right to education based on the country's level of income. HRMI breaks down the right to education by looking at the rights to both primary education and secondary education. While taking into consideration Liberia's income level, the nation is achieving 45.7% of what should be possible based on its resources (income) for primary education but only 26.1% for secondary education.

== Primary education ==
The Liberia Primary School Certificate Examination is coordinated in government-funded schools (and many private schools) by the West African Examinations Council.

== Secondary education ==
Secondary school examinations in government-funded schools (and many private schools) are coordinated by the West African Examinations Council. These are the Liberia Junior High School Certificate Examination, the Liberia Senior High School Certificate Examination and the West African Senior School Certificate Examination.

== Higher education ==
Historically, from 1862 to the outbreak of the war in the 1980s, higher education in the country centered on:

- Liberia College, the precursor to the University of Liberia
- Cuttington Collegiate College, the precursor to Cuttington University College
- Harper Technical College (founded in 1971), renamed William V. S. Tubman College of Technology in 1978, now known as Tubman University.

Currently higher education in Liberia is decentralized.

Higher education is provided by a number of public and private universities. The University of Liberia is the country's largest and oldest university. Located in Monrovia, the university opened in 1862 and today has six colleges, including a medical school and the nation's only law school, the Louis Arthur Grimes School of Law.

In 2009, Tubman University in Harper, Maryland County became the second public university in Liberia. Cuttington University, established by the Episcopal Church of the USA in 1889 in Suakoko, Bong County, is the nation's oldest private university. Since 2006, the government has also opened community colleges in Buchanan, Sanniquellie, Voinjama, and many other County headquarters.

In addition to the above-named colleges, there also exist:

- Starz University
- African Methodist Episcopal University
- Don Bosco Technical College
- United Methodist University (UMU)
- African Methodist Episcopal Zion University (AMEZU)
- African Bible College University (ABCU)
- Liberia International Christian College (LICC)
- Nimba County University College (NCUC)

These universities are greatly contributing to the higher education needs in Liberia. They have produced students that are working with international organizations such as the UN, international banking institutions, government, and other local institutions. Some are pursuing graduate degrees abroad due to limited graduate programs in the country. For example, while there is an undergraduate program in sociology at all of these universities, there is no graduate program for students wanting to pursue a graduate degree in sociology.

The following are disciplines in which undergraduate degrees are being offered: Sociology, geology, political science, history, biology, chemistry, economics. accounting, management, education, journalism, civil engineering, physics, mathematics, English, geography, social work, nursing, architectural engineering, rural development, laboratory technology, theology, general science, and agriculture. Some of these disciplines are only being offered at a single university. For example, Social Work is only being offered as a degree at the United Methodist University (UMU) and Mother Pattern College of Health Sciences, which falls under Don Bosco Polytechnic.

The University of Liberia offers graduate degrees in education, regional planning, international relations, and public administration, while Cuttington University is offering graduate degrees in education, Public Health, Business administration, Management, Public administration, and nursing education. The additional colleges do not have no graduate programs.

Liberia has three public Rural Teacher Training Institutes in Webbo, Kakata, and Zorzor.

== Corruption within the education system ==
In Liberia's education system, patronage and bribery by administrators, professors, and students are widely reported. Abuse of resources, teacher absenteeism, and sex for grades are common. A culture of silence prevents reporting of problems and hence any constructive reform.

In 2013, a confidential anonymous SMS suggestions box for students and educators began to operate in elements of Liberia's education system, in order to report systemic abuses.
