= Dagoberto Campos Salas =

Costa Rican prelate of the Catholic Church

His Excellency, The Most Reverend Dagoberto Campos Salas
- Apostolic Nuncio to Ecuador; Titular Archbishop of Forontoniana
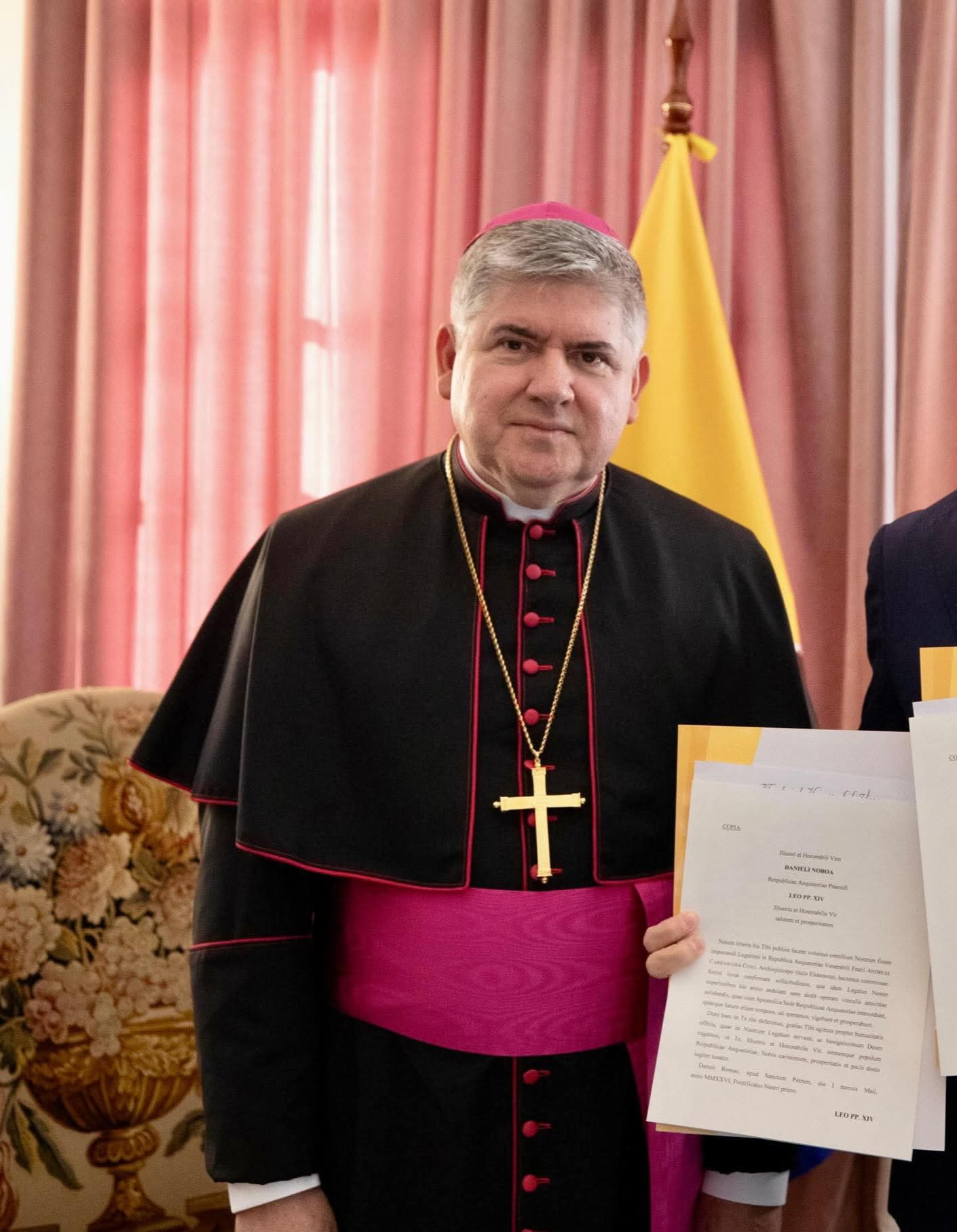
- His Excellency Monsignor Dagoberto Campos Salas at the presentation of his credentials as the new Apostolic Nuncio in Ecuador on June 16, 2026
- Church: Roman Catholic Church
- Appointed: 1 May 2026
- Predecessor: Andrés Carrascosa Coso
- Other post: Titular Archbishop of Forontoniana
- Previous posts: Apostolic Nuncio in Panama (2022-2026); Apostolic Nuncio to Liberia, Gambia and Sierra Leone (2018-2022)

Orders
- Ordination: 22 May 1994
- Consecration: 29 September 2018 by Pietro Parolin

Personal details
- Born: Dagoberto Campos Salas; 14 March 1966 (age 60) Puntarenas, Costa Rica
- Denomination: Roman Catholic
- Education: Pontifical Ecclesiastical Academy
- Motto: 'Amor fortior est'
- Coat of arms

Styles of Dagoberto Campos Salas
- Reference style: His Excellency; The Most Reverend
- Spoken style: Your Excellency
- Religious style: Archbishop

Dagoberto Campos Salas (born 14 March 1966) is a Costa Rican prelate of the Catholic Church who works in the diplomatic service of the Holy See. He is the first native of Costa Rica to hold the title of apostolic nuncio.

== Biography ==
Salas was born on 14 March 1966 to Dimas Campos and Benilda Salas in Puntarenas, Costa Rica, and after the age of ten lived in Abangares and Poás as well. He was ordained a priest on 22 May 1994 for the Diocese of Tilarán-Liberia and spent the next year as chaplain in the presidential palace during the administration of President José María Figueres.

He earned a degree in canon law and studied at the Pontifical Ecclesiastical Academy from 1995 to 1999.

== Diplomatic career ==
He entered the diplomatic service of the Holy See on 1 July 1999, filling assignments in the nunciatures in Sudan (1999-2003), Chile (2003-2006), Switzerland, Turkey and Mexico.

On 28 July 2018, Pope Francis appointed Apostolic Nuncio to Liberia and Titular Archbishop of Forontoniana. Salas was ordained a bishop by Cardinal Pietro Parolin at St. Peter's Basilica on 29 September 2018. He was given additional responsibilities as Nuncio to Gambia on 17 August 2018 and to Sierra Leone on 17 November 2018.

In Liberia, he received a complaint of abuse on the part of two bishops from a former priest; with the head of the Liberian Bishops Conference, he visited the Vatican in June 2019 to discuss the accusations and the bishops' denials.

On 14 May 2022, Pope Francis named him Apostolic Nuncio to Panama.

On May 1, 2026, the Pope Leo XIV named him Apostolic Nuncio in Ecuador.

== See also ==
- List of heads of the diplomatic missions of the Holy See
