= Francis Carroll (nuncio) =

Irish prelate

Francis Carroll SMA
- Vicar Apostolic of Monrovia
- Church: Catholic Church
- See: Apostolic Vicariate of Monrovia
- In office: 20 December 1960 – 28 October 1976
- Predecessor: John Collins
- Successor: Michael Kpakala Francis
- Other posts: Titular Archbishop of Gabula (1964-1980); Apostolic Pro-Nuncio to Liberia (1966-1979)
- Previous posts: Apostolic Internuncio to Liberia (1961-1966); Titular Bishop of Sozopolis in Haemimonto (1960-1964); Prefect of Cape Palmas (1950-1960)

Orders
- Ordination: 20 December 1936 by Edward Mulhern
- Consecration: 21 May 1961 by Pope John XXIII

Personal details
- Born: Francis Malachy Carroll; 12 June 1912 Newry, County Down, United Kingdom of Great Britain and Ireland
- Died: 10 October 1980 (aged 68) Newry, County Down, Northern Ireland, United Kingdom

Francis Malachy Carroll, SMA (12 June 1912 – 10 October 1980) was a Northern Irish Catholic prelate who served as Apostolic Pro-Nuncio to Liberia from 1966 to 1979. He previously served as Prefect Apostolic of Cape Palmas from 1950 to 1960 and Apostolic Vicar of Monrovia from 1960 to 1976. He was a member of the Society of African Missions.

== Biography ==
Francis Carroll was born in Newry, County Down, Northern Ireland, in the Diocese of Dromore, on 12 June 1912. He studied at schools in Newry run by the Christian Brothers from 1916 to 1927, when he decided to become a missionary priest. He then studied until 1931 at the institutions of the Society of African Missions (SMA): Sacred Heart College, Ballinafad, County Mayo; St. Joseph's College, Wilton, Cork. He entered the SMA novitiate at Kilcolgan, County Galway, and was admitted to the SMA on 2 July 1933. He studied theology in the major seminary at Dromantine, County Down, until June 1937. He was ordained a priest in St. Colman's Cathedral, Newry, on 20 December 1936.

He was assigned to the SMA's Liberian mission and arrived in Liberia in October 1937. He focused his work on education, opening and managing schools while maintaining good relations with the government education department. In 1946, Liberian President William Tubman awarded Carroll the Star of Africa in recognition of his education work.

On 2 February 1950 the Holy See divided the Vicariate of Liberia, creating the Prefecture of Cape Palmas and the Vicariate of Monrovia. Carroll was nominated Prefect Apostolic of Cape Palmas on 27 October 1950. On 20 December 1960, Pope John XXIII named him Apostolic Vicar of Monrovia and titular bishop of Sozopolis in Haemimonto. He received his episcopal consecration on 21 May 1961 in St. Peter's Basilica from Pope John XXIII.

He was given the additional title of Apostolic Internuncio to Liberia on 9 November 1961 and assigned the titular see of archbishop of Gabula on 14 January 1964. On 7 March 1966, Pope Paul VI appointed him Apostolic Pro-Nuncio to Liberia.

With increasingly ill health Carroll offered his resignation as Apostolic Vicar, which was accepted in February 1976. (Note: His successor as Apostolic Vicar, Michael Kpakala Francis, was named on 28 October 1976.) In April 1979, Pope John Paul II accepted Carroll's resignation as Pro-Nuncio. (Note: Johannes Dyba was named to succeed him as Pro-Nuncio on 25 August 1979.)

Carroll retired to the SMA house in Tenafly, New Jersey, United States. He died in his family's home in Newry on 10 October 1980.
