= Dromantine House =

Dromantine House was a seminary of the Society of African Missions from 1926 until 1972. The estate is still owned by the Society of African Missions but currently serves as a "Retreat and Conference Centre" Over its lifetime as a seminary some 600 priests were ordained for service in Africa. The decision was taken that from 1972 students would train at the National Seminary in Maynooth.

Prior to the acquisition of Dromatine the Society of African Missions in Ireland had St. Joseph's Seminary on the Blackrock Road in Cork. The seminary and its students were transferred to Dromantine House. The Society of African Missions also had a Novitiate in at Cloughballymore, Kilcolgan, Co. Galway, from which students would progress from this to the Major seminary at Dromantine.

Over the years the building and facilities have developed and updated. The St. Patrick's wing on the east side was added in November 1931. the St. Brendan's Wing on the west side was built in 1935. In 1959, the St. Colman's Wing with 62 study-bedrooms and a new assembly and lecture hall were added. In 2001, after a number of years of renovations, the Retreat and Conference Centre was opened.

Prior to the SMA Fathers taking over the property, the Estate was the stately home of the McInnes family, often called the Manor of Clanagan.

== Dromantine Retreat and Conference Centre ==
Now the House and its facilities are used as a Retreat and Conference Centre. Diploma and Certificate Courses in Theology are run from the centre on evenings and at the weekends. A number of other pastoral care programmes for the Diocese of Down and Connor are also run from the centre.

The family event known as the "Dromantine Fun Day" are run annually during the summer. The event has been the main fund-raising event for the House since the 1950s. During the event the grounds are opened for stalls selling food, attractions and live music is played on an outdoor stage.

During the Summer, a summer school is run within Dromantine House.

In partnership with the Mater Dei Institute of Education (part of DCU) in Dublin, the Society of African Missions at Dromantine and Methodist Edgehill Theological College in Belfast ran a three-year Exploring Theology Certificate course accredited by Dublin City University, in Dromantine.
