= Michael Kpakala Francis =

Liberian Roman Catholic prelate (1936 - 2013)

The Most Reverend Michael Kpakala Francis
- Archbishop Emeritus of Monrovia, Liberia (Deceased)
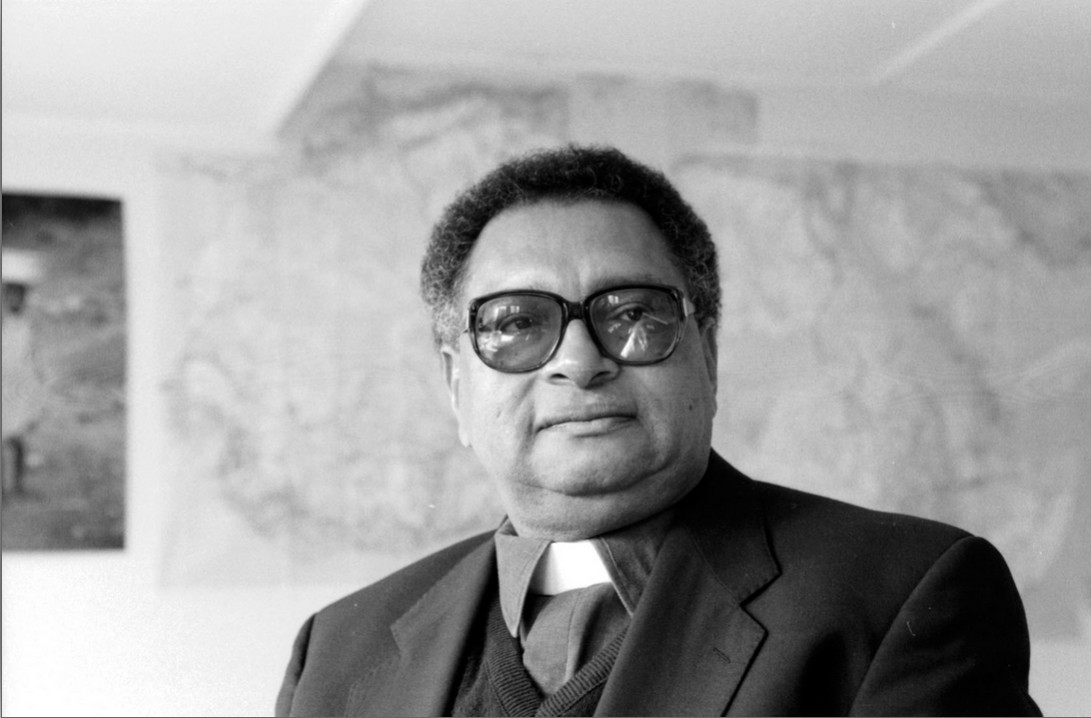
- Francis in 1992
- Church: Catholic Church
- Archdiocese: Roman Catholic Archdiocese of Monrovia
- See: Monrovia
- Appointed: 19 December 1981
- Installed: 19 December 1981
- Term ended: 12 February 2011
- Predecessor: Francis Malachy Carroll
- Successor: Lewis Jerome Zeigler
- Other posts: Apostolic Vicar of Monrovia, Liberia (28 October 1976 - 19 Dec 1981)

Orders
- Ordination: 4 August 1963 by Nicholas Grimley
- Consecration: 19 December 1976 by Francis Malachy Carroll
- Rank: Archbishop

Personal details
- Born: Michael Kpakala Francis; February 12, 1936 Kakata, Liberia
- Died: 19 May 2013 (aged 77)

Styles of Michael Kpakala Francis
- Reference style: Your Lordship; The Most Reverend
- Spoken style: His Lordship
- Religious style: Bishop

Michael Kpakala Francis (12 February 1936 – 19 May 2013) was a Liberian prelate of the Catholic Church who led the Apostolic Vicariate of Monrovia from 1976 to 1981 and then served as the first Archbishop of the newly established Roman Catholic Archdiocese of Monrovia from 1981 to 2011. He retired from pastoral care on 12 February 2011, having attained the mandatory retirement age of 75 years for Catholic bishops. He died on 19 May 2013, three months following his 77th birthday.

== Biography ==
Michael Kpakala Francis was born on 12 February 1936 in Kakata District, Liberia. He was ordained a priest on 4 August 1963.

On 28 October 1976, Pope Paul VI appointed him titular bishop of Ausuccura and Apostolic Vicar of Monrovia. He received his episcopal consecration on 19 December 1976 from his predecessor, Francis Carroll.

On 19 December 1981, Pope John Paul appointed him the first Archbishop of the newly created Archdiocese of Monrovia.

He suffered a stroke in 2004 that left him paralyzed and unable to speak, using a wheelchair to move. Andrew J. Karnley was named apostolic administrator to help manage the affairs of the Archdiocese. Pope Benedict XVI accepted his resignation on 12 February 2011. (Note: Karnley had been appointed Bishop of Cape Palmas a month earlier.)

He was the first priest and bishop to institute the Catholic Justice and Peace Council (J.P.C.) in Liberia. This council was organized to defend human rights and civil liberty in the war-ravaged country under then-President Charles Taylor. In 1996, after the famous 6 April fracas in Monrovia, the bishop decided to close all Catholic schools because he felt Catholic institutions (including Radio Veritas) were targeted by fighters loyal to Taylor. The bishop later reconsidered his decision in 1997, after a public outcry.

He died on 19 May 2013 following an illness.

Francis was a recipient of the Robert F. Kennedy Human Rights Award in 1999, given each year to an individual whose courageous activism is at the heart of the human rights movement and in the spirit of Robert F. Kennedy's vision and legacy.
