= Benedict Dotu Sekey =

Ghanaian Catholic bishop

- Bishop of Gbarnga
- Church: Catholic Church
- Diocese: Diocese of Gbarnga
- In office: 17 November 1986 – 13 December 2000
- Predecessor: Diocese erected
- Successor: Lewis Jerome Zeigler

Orders
- Ordination: 20 August 1967 by Nicholas Grimley
- Consecration: 6 January 1987 by Pope John Paul II

Personal details
- Born: 10 August 1940 Accra, Colony of the Gold Coast, British Empire
- Died: 13 December 2000 (aged 60)

Benedict Dotu Sekey (10 August 1940 in Accra – 13 December 2000) was a Ghanaian clergyman and bishop for the Roman Catholic Diocese of Gbarnga in Liberia. He was ordained in 1967. He was appointed in 1986. He died in 2000.
