= American International School of Medicine =

Private medical school in Guyana

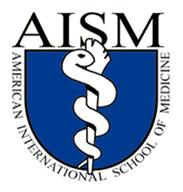
- Type: Medical School
- Established: 1999; 27 years ago
- President: Dr. Colin A Wilkinson
- Location: 89 Sandy Babb Street Georgetown Georgetown, Guyana
- Website: www.aism.edu

The American International School of Medicine (AISM) is a private medical school with its main campus in Georgetown, Guyana, and a US information office in Atlanta, Georgia. Clinical placements in the United States of America, United Kingdom, India, Canada, and some sites in Africa. Graduates obtain a Medical Doctorate upon successful completion of the four or five years of didactic education and training candidates earn the doctor of medicine degree to exit the medical program successfully.

The AISM is chartered in and is recognized by the government of Guyana. AISM is registered with the National Accreditation Council of Guyana. The university is listed in the AVICENNA directory of medicine and the FAIMER International Medical Education Directory (IMED) and World Health Organization.

== History ==
AISM was established in 1999 by International Medical Educators Associates, Inc. (IMEA) in Atlanta, Georgia, USA, headed by Dr. Colin A. Wilkinson. The establishment of AISM in Guyana was approved by the Cabinet of the Government of Guyana on October 19, 1999. The first batch of students was admitted in January 2000. Since then, AISM has graduated hundreds of physicians, researchers, academics, and medical education administrators who are working in Guyana, U.K., USA, Antigua and Barbuda, Grenada, Nigeria, India, Trinidad, Pakistan, Tanzania and other countries.

In 2012, AISM collaborated with the Civil Defence Commission and the Cheddi Jagan International Airport trained 18 airport staff members to be certified as first responders.

== Medical Program ==
AISM has a four-year Doctor of Medicine (MD) Program. It consists of 5 semesters of basic sciences and 6 semesters of clinical sciences. The basic sciences program is taught at the Georgetown, Guyana campus and the clinical sciences program is completed in Guyana, the US, and/or the UK.

After completing the basic sciences program, students take the USMLE Step 1 examination. Upon completion of the program, students take the USMLE step 2 examination and/or if applicable the PLAB.

AISM graduates are eligible to take the Medical Council of India (MCI) approved for interning in clinical practice in India examination(s) to be able to complete postgraduate training and practice in India. Many AISM graduates are invited and have accepted residency training positions in Guyana, the USA, the UK, Caricom countries, and Nigeria, to name a few jurisdictions.

== Tuition ==
The tuition cost for the MD program as of January 2017 was:

- Average tuition for the Basic Sciences per semester is: US$7,500
- Average tuition for the Clinical Sciences per semester is: US$8,500
