= Tubman University =

Public university in Harper, Liberia

William V. S. Tubman University
- Former names: William V. S. Tubman College of Technology; William V. S. Tubman Teachers College
- Type: Public
- Established: 1978; 48 years ago
- Affiliations: National Commission on Higher Education
- President: Dr. Olu Q. Menjay.
- Undergraduates: 1195 (2015)
- Location: Harper, Maryland County, Liberia; 4.40021°N 7.69655°W
- Campus: Urban
- Mascot: Phoenix
- Website: tubmanu.edu.lr
- Founding president Dr. Elizabeth Davis-Russell, 2008 - 2016

William V. S. Tubman University, commonly known as Tubman University, is a public university located in Harper, Maryland County, Liberia. The university is named after William Tubman, the 19th President of Liberia.

Founded in 1978 as the William V. S. Tubman College of Technology, the school originally offered associate's degrees in architecture, civil engineering, electrical engineering, electronics and mechanical engineering. Tubman was also one of the main schools in Liberia to produce secondary school teachers. In 1990, the college was accredited to offer Bachelor of Science degrees in those fields, but soon closed following the outbreak of the First Liberian Civil War. The school remained closed through the 1990s up to the end of the Second Liberian Civil War in 2003. Enrollment numbers showed 264 students and a faculty of 28 in 1999.

In 2008, the college was reopened by President Ellen Johnson Sirleaf, with Dr. Elizabeth Davis-Russell appointed that year as the first female president of the university. In April 2009, Sirleaf signed a bill elevating Tubman to university status, and the newly renamed and renovated university opened on 14 September 2009. The school's enrollment stood at 288 at that time, of which 219 were male and 69 were female. Enrollment stood at 838 for the first semester of the 2013-14 school year, and the school held its first commencement in June 2014. William V. S. Tubman University is proud of its graduating class of nursing students who experienced a 100% pass-rate on the State Board of Nursing examinations. The nation's first female mechanical engineer graduated from William V. S. Tubman University in 2016.

== Organization ==
The university is governed by a board of trustees appointed by the president of Liberia. The university is organized into six colleges:

- College of Agriculture and Food Sciences
- College of Education
- College of Engineering and Technology
- College of Health Sciences
- College of Management and Administration
- College of Arts and Sciences
