= American International School of Monrovia =

Location
- Congo Town, Monrovia, Liberia
- Coordinates: 6.279371°N 10.748008°W

Information
- School type: Independent school
- Motto: Achievement, Integrity, Service, Motivation
- Founded: 1960 (closed in 1990); 2007 (re-opening)
- Director: Dr. Cassandra Hazel
- Grades: Pre K - 12
- Gender: Co-Educational
- Enrolment: 93
- Education system: American
- Language: English
- Website: https://www.aismonrovia.org/

The American International School of Monrovia (AISM) is an American International school in Congo Town, Monrovia, Liberia. As of 2017 it serves grades early childhood through 10.

Originally founded in 1960 as the American Cooperative School, the school closed in April 1990 due to the First Liberian Civil War. The school reopened under its current name, AISM, in 2007 with support of the American Embassy and the Liberian Government. As of 2021, it has 93 students. The educational programing includes Pre-K through the 10th grade.

== Curriculum ==
The school offers a rigorous American Curriculum under the framework/standards from AERO- American Educators Reaching Out. AERO is a project supported by the U.S. State Department's Office of Overseas Schools and the Overseas Schools Advisory Council to assist schools in developing and implementing standards-based curricula in alignment with the Common Core and many other top tier international schools. AERO's resources, workshops, and professional development/consultation services assist overseas schools to implement and sustain standards-based curricula. AISM incorporates standardized testing (MAP) to measure student mastery of skills and curriculum along with other formative and summative assessments to ensure students are achieving educational milestones.

== Facilities ==
The school is located in a residential area, approximately 5 miles from downtown Monrovia, in a section called Congo Town, Old Road. The large physical plant is situated on a 6-acre beautiful site. Nineteen classrooms have been renovated, including the recent construction of a science lab, art room, and library. There are playground areas in front of and adjacent to the school, for Early Childhood and Lower school students. Throughout the campus, there are beautiful flower gardens, with seating areas, to read, study, and gather for upper school students. There is a large gymnasium and a regulation-size soccer field. The campus is wireless and uses fiber-optic technology; the school has Google Chromebooks for students to borrow.
