= Walter Erbì =

Italian clergyman and diplomat

His Excellency, The Most Reverend Walter Erbì
- Apostolic Nuncio of Indonesia and ASEAN; Titular Archbishop of Nepi
- Appointed: 1 July 2026
- Predecessor: Piero Pioppo
- Other post: Titular Archbishop of Nepi
- Previous post: Apostolic Nuncio to Liberia, Sierra Leone and Gambia (2022-2026)

Orders
- Ordination: 10 May 1992
- Consecration: 3 September 2022 by Pietro Parolin, Arrigo Miglio, and Giovanni Paolo Zedda

Personal details
- Born: 8 January 1968 (age 58) Turin, Italy
- Motto: SUB TUUM PRÆSIDIUM
- Coat of arms

Styles of Walter Erbì
- Reference style: His Excellency; The Most Reverend
- Spoken style: Your Excellency
- Religious style: Archbishop

Walter Erbì (born 8 January 1968) is an Italian prelate of the Catholic Church who works in the diplomatic service of the Holy See.

== Biography ==
Walter Erbì was born on 8 January 1968 in Turin, Italy. He was ordained a priest for the Diocese of Iglesias on 10 May 1992.

== Diplomatic career ==
To prepare for a diplomatic career he joined the Pontifical Ecclesiastical Academy in 1999. He entered the diplomatic service of the Holy See on 1 July 2001 and has served in the apostolic nunciature in the Philippines, in the General Affairs Section of the Secretariat of State and in the Pontifical Representations in Italy, the United States of America and Turkey. He graduated in canon law.

He speaks Italian, Spanish, English and French.

On 16 July 2022, Pope Francis appointed him Titular Archbishop of Nepi and Apostolic Nuncio to Liberia.

On 20 July 2022, Pope Francis also added the post of nuncio to Sierra Leone. He was consecrated as an archbishop on 3 September 2022.

On 30 November 2022, Pope Francis also appointed him as nuncio to Gambia.

On 1 July 2026, Pope Leo XIV appointed him as nuncio to Indonesia and ASEAN.

On 6 November 2026, he presented his credentials to Indonesian President Prabowo Subianto at the Merdeka Palace.

== See also ==
- List of heads of the diplomatic missions of the Holy See
