= Diocese of Cape Palmas =

Roman Catholic diocese in Liberia

Coordinates: 4.3757°N 7.7128°W

Diocese of Cape Palmas Dioecesis Capitis Palmensis

Location
- Country: Liberia
- Metropolitan: Monrovia

Statistics
- Area: 31,760 km^{2} (12,260 sq mi)
- Population: Total; Catholics: (as of 2006); 271,000; 19,100 (7.0%)

Information
- Denomination: Catholic Church
- Sui iuris church: Latin Church
- Rite: Roman Rite

Current leadership
- Pope: Leo XIV
- Bishop: Andrew J. Karnley

The Diocese of Cape Palmas (Latin: Dioecesis Capitis Palmensis) is a Latin Church ecclesiastical territory or diocese of the Catholic Church in Liberia. Its episcopal see is Cape Palmas. The Diocese of Cape Palmas is a suffragan diocese in the ecclesiastical province of the metropolitan Archdiocese of Monrovia.

== History ==
- February 2, 1950: Established as Apostolic Prefecture of Cape Palmas from the Apostolic Vicariate of Liberia
- May 7, 1962: Promoted as Apostolic Vicariate of Cape Palmas
- December 19, 1981: Promoted as Diocese of Cape Palmas

== Bishops ==
- Prefect Apostolic of Cape Palmas
  - Father Francis Carroll, S.M.A. (1950.10.27 – 1960.12.20), appointed Vicar Apostolic of Monrovia; future Archbishop
- Vicars Apostolic of Cape Palmas
  - Bishop Nicholas Grimley, S.M.A. (1962.05.07 – 1972.07.30)
  - Bishop Patrick Kla Juwle (1972.07.30 – 1973.08.18)
  - Bishop Boniface Nyema Dalieh (1973.12.17 – 1981.12.19); see below
- Bishops of Cape Palmas
  - Bishop Boniface Nyema Dalieh (1981.12.19 - 2008.10.15); see above
  - Bishop Andrew J. Karnley (since 2011.04.30)

=== Other priest of this diocese who became bishop ===
- Benedict Dotu Sekey, appointed Bishop of Gbarnga in 1986

== See also ==
- Roman Catholicism in Liberia

== Sources ==
- GCatholic.org
- Catholic Hierarchy
