= Archdiocese of Monrovia =

Latin Catholic jurisdiction in Liberia

Coordinates: 6.3191°N 10.8103°W

Archdiocese of Monrovia Archidioecesis Monroviensis

Location
- Country: Liberia
- Ecclesiastical province: Monrovia

Statistics
- Area: 6,168 sq mi (15,980 km^{2})
- Population: Total; Catholics: (as of 2013); 2,058,000; 140,705 (6.8%)
- Parishes: 30

Information
- Denomination: Catholic Church
- Sui iuris church: Latin Church
- Rite: Roman Rite
- Established: 18 April 1903
- Secular priests: 27 (2013)

Current leadership
- Pope: Leo XIV
- Metropolitan Archbishop: Gabriel Blamo Snosio Jubwe

Map
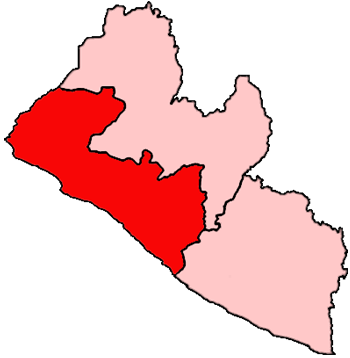

The Archdiocese of Monrovia (Archidioecesis Monroviensis) is Latin Church ecclesiastical territory or archdiocese of the Catholic Church in Liberia. It was elevated to an archdiocese in December 1981. It was initially established as the Prefecture Apostolic of Liberia in 1903, being separated from the Apostolic Vicariate of Sierra Leone (which is now the Archdiocese of Freetown and Bo). Until Saturday, February 12, 2011, the Archdiocese of Monrovia had been headed by Michael Kpakala Francis, who had been Monrovia's archbishop since its elevation in 1981, but Vatican Information Service (VIS) stated that he resigned that day for reasons of age and was succeeded immediately by his Coadjutor Archbishop, Lewis Jerome Zeigler.

According to church statistics, the percentage of Catholics under the archdiocese has risen to 8.2 percent of the total population in 2004 out of a total of approximately 1.6 million people. The Diocese of Cape Palmas was created from it in 1981. The Diocese of Gbarnga was created from it in 1986.

== Bishops ==
=== Ordinaries ===
==== Prefect Apostolic of Liberia ====
- Father Jean Ogé, SMA (3 January 1911 – 16 November 1931)
- Father John Collins, SMA (26 February 1932 – 9 April 1934); see below

==== Vicar Apostolic of Liberia ====
- John Collins, SMA (9 April 1934 – 2 February 1950); see above & below

==== Vicars Apostolic of Monrovia ====
- John Collins, SMA (2 February 1950 – 20 December 1960); see above
- Francis Carroll, SMA (20 December 1960 – 28 October 1976); concurrent with this, became nuncio in 1961 and titular archbishop in 1964
- Michael Kpakala Francis (28 October 1976 – 19 December 1981); see below

==== Archbishops of Monrovia ====
- Michael Kpakala Francis (19 December 1981 – 12 February 2011); see above
- Lewis Jerome Zeigler (12 February 2011 – 7 June 2021)
- Gabriel Blamo Snosio Jubwe (28 February 2024 – )

=== Coadjutor Archbishop ===
- Lewis Jerome Zeigler (2009–2011)

=== Other priest of this diocese who became bishop ===
- Lewis Jerome Zeigler (priest here, 1974–1986), appointed Bishop of Gbarnga in 2002; later returned here as Coadjutor
- Andrew J. Karnley (Priest here, 1995–2011, Apostolic Administrator here, 2005–2009), appointed Bishop of Cape Palmas in 2011
- Anthony Fallah Borwah (Priest here, 1996–2011), appointed Bishop of Gbarnga in 2011

== See also ==
- List of Roman Catholic dioceses in Liberia
- Stella Maris Polytechnic

== Sources ==
- Archdiocese of Monrovia on catholichierarchy.org
