= Lewis Jerome Zeigler =

Liberian Roman Catholic prelate (1944–2022)

The Most Reverend Lewis Jerome Zeigler
- Archbishop of Monrovia
- Church: Roman Catholic Church
- Archdiocese: Monrovia
- See: Monrovia
- Appointed: 12 February 2011
- Term ended: 7 June 2021
- Predecessor: Michael Kpakala Francis
- Successor: Gabriel Blamo Snosio Jubwe
- Previous posts: Bishop of Gbarnga (2002–2009); Coadjutor Archbishop of Monrovia (2009–2011); President of the Liberian Episcopal Conference (2005–2017)

Orders
- Ordination: 22 December 1974
- Consecration: 9 November 2002 by Michael Kpakala Francis

Personal details
- Born: 4 January 1944 Harrisburg, Liberia
- Died: 12 August 2022 (aged 78) Monrovia, Liberia
- Denomination: Roman Catholic

Ordination history of Lewis Jerome Zeigler
History
Episcopal consecration
- Principal consecrator: Michael Kpakala Francis
- Co-consecrators: Joseph Henry Ganda; Boniface Nyema Dalieh
Episcopal succession
Bishops consecrated by Lewis Jerome Zeigler as principal consecrator
- Anthony Fallah Borwah: 11 June 2011

Lewis Jerome Zeigler (4 January 1944 – 12 August 2022) was a Liberian Roman Catholic prelate who served as the Archbishop of Monrovia since 2011 until 2021. Zeigler was born in Harrisburg in 1944 and was ordained in 1974 before he was appointed in 2002 as the Bishop of Gbarnga. He was later named as the Coadjutor Archbishop of Monrovia in 2009 and ascended to head the diocese in 2011 after his predecessor died in office. Zeigler was a conservative prelate who opposed same-sex marriage and abortion in Liberia.

== Life ==
Lewis Jerome Zeigler was born in 1944 in Harrisburg in Liberia. He was ordained to the priesthood in Monrovia on 22 December 1974 and was incardinated in the Gbarnga diocese just over a decade later on 17 November 1986. Pope John Paul II appointed Zeigler as the Bishop of Gbarnga and Zeigler received his episcopal consecration on 9 November 2002 from Michael Kpakala Francis at the Gbarnga Cathedral.

He later was transferred to Monrovia in 2009 after Pope Benedict XVI appointed him as the coadjutor bishop to Francis which also meant he would succeed Francis at once following the latter's resignation or death. In 2011 he became the Archbishop of Monrovia after Francis resigned and he was installed at some point after. On 11 June 2018 he made his first "ad limina apostolorum" visit to Pope Francis.

== Positions ==
=== Priesthood ===
In 2015 at the Chrism Mass the archbishop called on priests to desist from activities that distract them from their ecclesial duties and said that most priests seemed to chase wealth and material goods involved with the world rather than focusing their lives on the Church. Zeigler said: "It is my appeal to all of you, my fellow priests, to serve and not to chase things of the world like iPhones, iPads and whatever".

Zeigler also called on the faithful to pray for their pastors whenever they do wrong since it would "help to strengthen and put them on the right path".

=== Corruption ===
Zeigler has referred to corruption as the major foe to nation building in Liberia and has said that corruption hinders national progress. The archbishop said that "our society is sick" due to greed and selfishness which has swallowed the nation. He also called on Liberians to fight against corruption by focusing on defeating individual greed.

=== Homosexuality ===
In an address at an official service at the Providence Baptist Church as a guest speaker on 11 April 2014, the archbishop spoke against homosexuality and same-sex marriage, observing that Liberian culture was being denigrated by calamity due to Liberians "ignoring their creator" and entering into "unwholesome activities that continue to annoy God". Zeigler also said that such national crises such as the Ebola outbreak came about due to the dissolute ways Liberians lived that displeased God.

Zeigler further referred to same-sex marriage as an "abomination".

== See also ==
- Catholic Church in Liberia
- Religion in Liberia

Catholic Church titles
| Preceded by Michael Kpakala Francis | Archbishop of Monrovia; 2011–2021 | Succeeded by Sede vacante |
| Preceded by Benedict Dotu Sekey | Bishop of Gbarnga; 2002–2009 | Succeeded by Anthony Fallah Borwah |
