= Harper, Liberia =

Harper
- Town
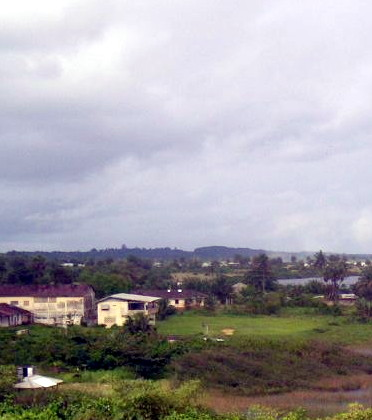
- Harper in 2004

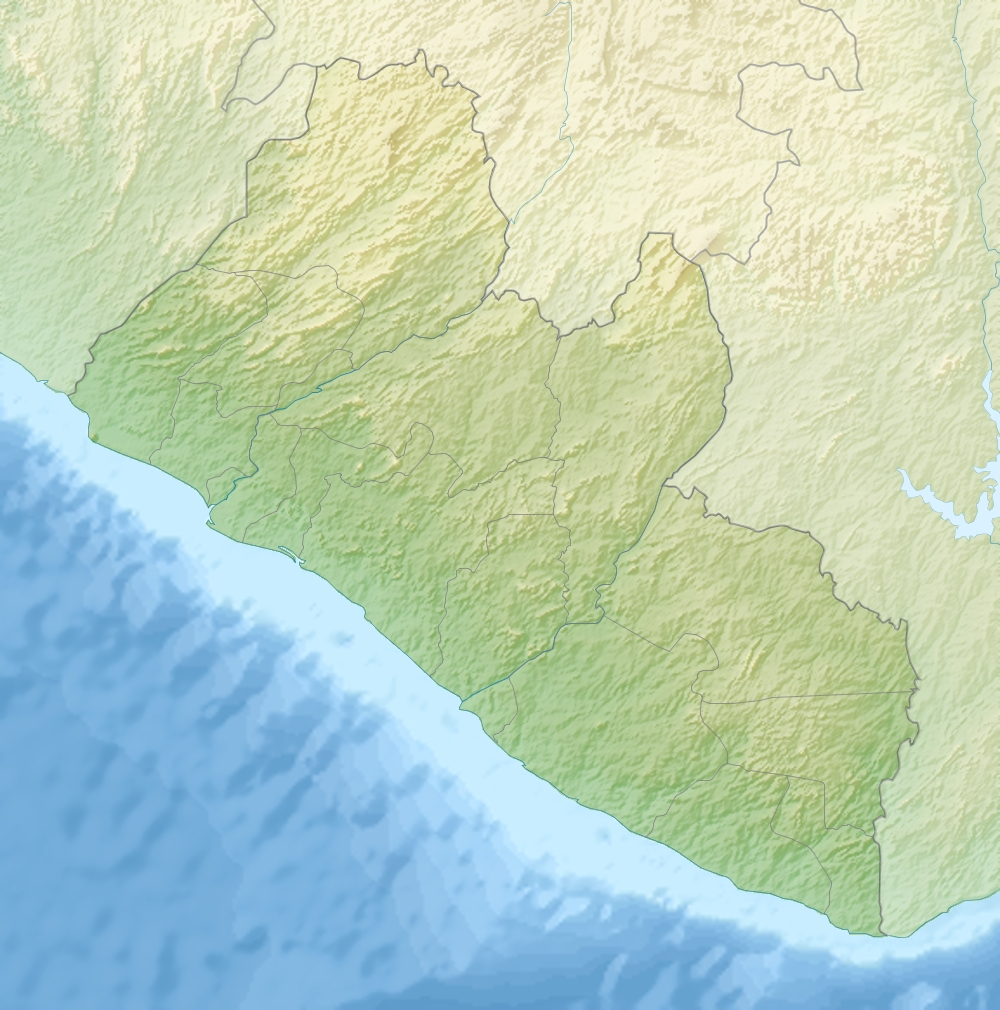
- Location in Liberia
- Coordinates: 04°22′33″N 07°42′03″W
- Country: Liberia
- County: Maryland County

Population (2008)
  - Total: 17,837
- Time zone: UTC±00:00
- Climate: Af

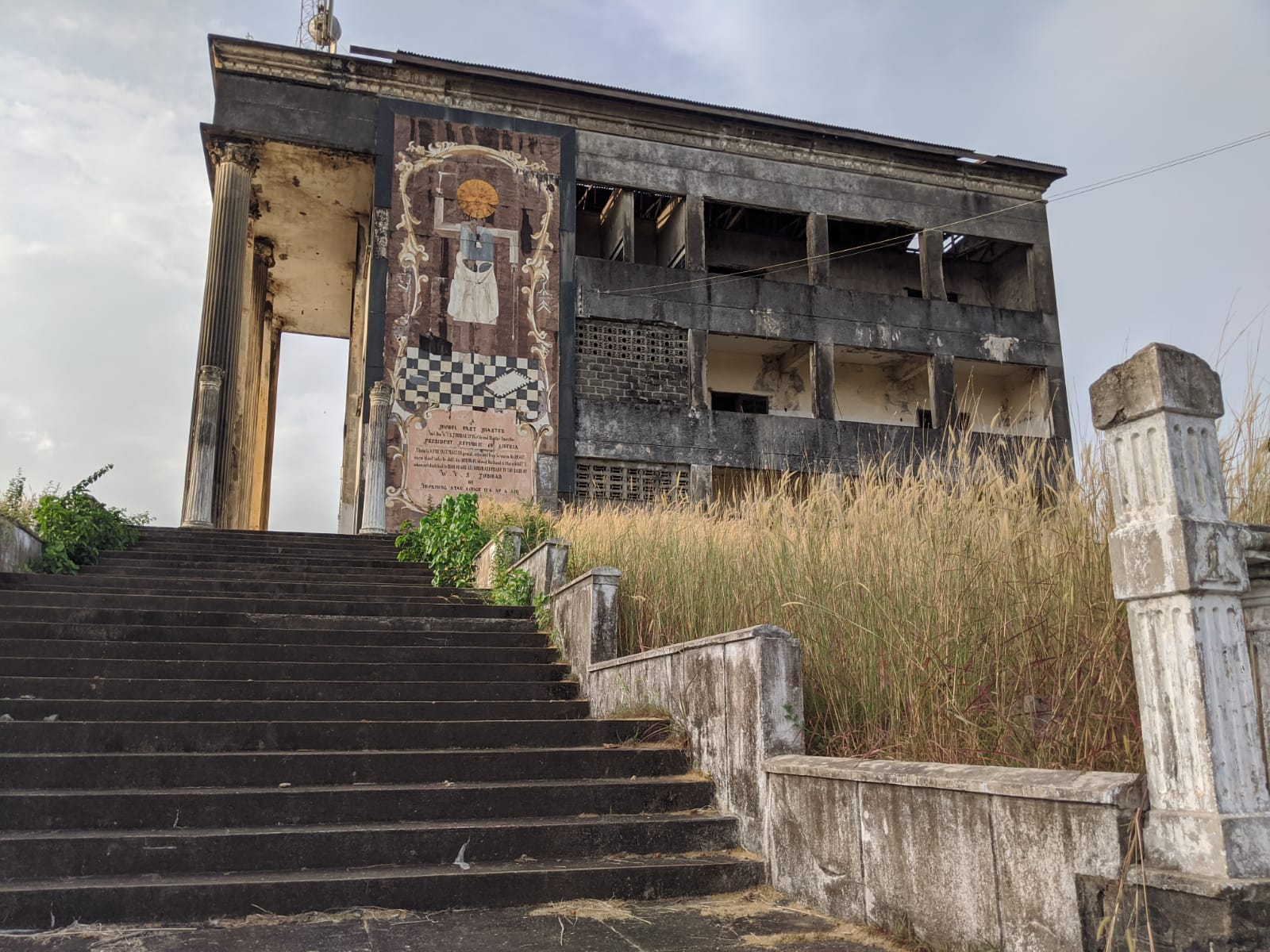
Shell of Morning Star Masonic Lodge, Harper, Liberia

Harper, situated on Cape Palmas, is the capital of Maryland County in Liberia. It is a coastal town situated between the Atlantic Ocean and the Hoffman River. Harper is Liberia's 11th largest town, with a population of 17,837.

== Name ==
The town is named after Robert Goodloe Harper, a prominent U.S. politician and member of the American Colonization Society. It was he who proposed the name Liberia for the American Colonization Society's settlement in Africa, and the town of Harper was named in honor of him. Harper was the capital of the short-lived Republic of Maryland (1834–1857).

== Geography ==
A warm ocean temperature is present year round. Fish are found in abundance, as well as whales, dolphins, and large oysters. Fanti canoes sail from Harper to Monrovia via Greenville. This trip can take from 3 to 6 days depending on the wind and weather. A UNMIL ship, the MV Catarina, sails fortnightly between Harper and Monrovia. From the Ivory Coast, Harper is accessible from Tabou.

Local landmarks are the old, ruined mansion of William Tubman, President of Liberia, and the shell of the Morning Star Masonic Lodge, also built by Tubman.

== History ==
=== Americo-Liberian period ===
Harper was the capital of the Republic of Maryland, an independent country (1834–1857), the last component of modern Liberia.

Cape Palmas, the region of which Harper is the center, is one of the traditional hometowns of the Americo-Liberians, descendants of free people of color and freed slaves from the United States who settled in Liberia and declared it an independent country in 1847. John Brown Russwurm, an African-American abolitionist and governor of Monrovia, was buried in Harper after his death. There is a statue to commemorate his gravesite.

Harper as it existed prior to the Civil Wars was based on the plantation architecture of the southern United States, where many of the Americo-Liberians came from. "Today [2016], no place captures the ambiguous world of the Americo-Liberians better than Harper, whose oldest neighborhoods are reminiscent of New Orleans. Once occupied by the ruling elite, houses in the style of plantation mansions now stand silent and ghostly."

One of the town's most famous citizens is President William Tubman (1895-1971), who was born in Harper. In 2021, his mansion lies in ruins and is occupied by squatters.

=== Civil War and after ===
Before the First Liberian Civil War, Harper was an important administrative centre.

During the 1970s, Harper was terrorized by Maryland ritual killings. The crimes have been regarded as "Liberia's most notorious ritual killing case" due to the number of murders, the involvement of high ranking government officials, and their subsequent public executions.

Tubman University, one of only two public universities in Liberia, is located in Harper.

Harper is also home to the Roman Catholic Diocese of Cape Palmas, one of three dioceses of the Catholic Church in Liberia.

== See also ==
- Maryland ritual killings
- Republic of Maryland
