= African Methodist Episcopal University =

University in Monrovia, Liberia

- School seal
- Type: Private
- Established: 1995; 31 years ago
- Religious affiliation: African Methodist Episcopal Church
- President: Rev. Alvin E. Attah, Sr. (interim)
- Students: 5,051 (2018)
- Undergraduates: 4,797
- Postgraduates: 254
- Location: Monrovia, Liberia; 6°18′38″N 10°48′04″W
- Website: www.ame.edu.lr

The African Methodist Episcopal University (AMEU) is a private institution of higher learning located in Monrovia, in the West African nation of Liberia. Located on Camp Johnson Road, the school is the second largest college in Liberia with over 5,000 students. The school was established in 1995 by the African Methodist Episcopal Church, and chartered by the Liberian Legislature in 1996.

== History ==
AMEU was organized in 1995 by Bishop Cornal Garnett Henning, Sr. and leaders of the African Methodist Episcopal Church, during his administration as presiding prelate. Bryant Theological Seminary was the first component school of the university. Bryant Theological Seminary had been started in 1992 by David R. Daniels, Jr., now a bishop in the church. The university was then chartered in February 1996.

In 2003, Louise C. York served as president of the university, and accounting was the most popular major at the Christian school. During the Second Liberian Civil War in 2003, the school's campus was attacked and ransacked. As the commencement ceremony proceeded that year, the 185 graduates could hear mortar shells exploding in the background as rebel forces attempted to take the capital. After the civil strife ended, the country's National Commission on Higher Education approved the university to operate on a temporary basis in November 2005, and in February 2006 the school received full approval.

A scam by students at the school in February 2006 cost the university US$100,000 (~$149,257 in 2024) in lost funds, which resulted in the arrest of four people the next month. Also in February 2006, USAID paid for some reconstruction on the campus. Levi Zangar resigned as president of the school in November 2006 citing problems with the school's board of directors. In April 2007, students protested against the university's administration for requiring students to pay 80% of tuition for the new semester prior to classes beginning.

The school held its eighth commencement in November 2007 at the Samuel Kanyon Doe Sports Complex, with Liberian President Ellen Johnson Sirleaf as the convocation speaker. The school graduated over 400 students at that time. In February 2011, students at AMEU protested an increase in tuition, poor pay for their instructors, and for providing a poor education. The school had raised the cost per course to US$11 from $8. As of 2018, the school had 5,051 students enrolled, with 254 of those being graduate students. The total enrollment placed the school as the second biggest in the country, behind only the University of Liberia. On March 31, 2020, a new interim president, Rev. Alvin E. Attah, Sr., was named by the Board of Trustees of the university.
