= Romeo Panciroli =

Italian prelate of the Catholic Church

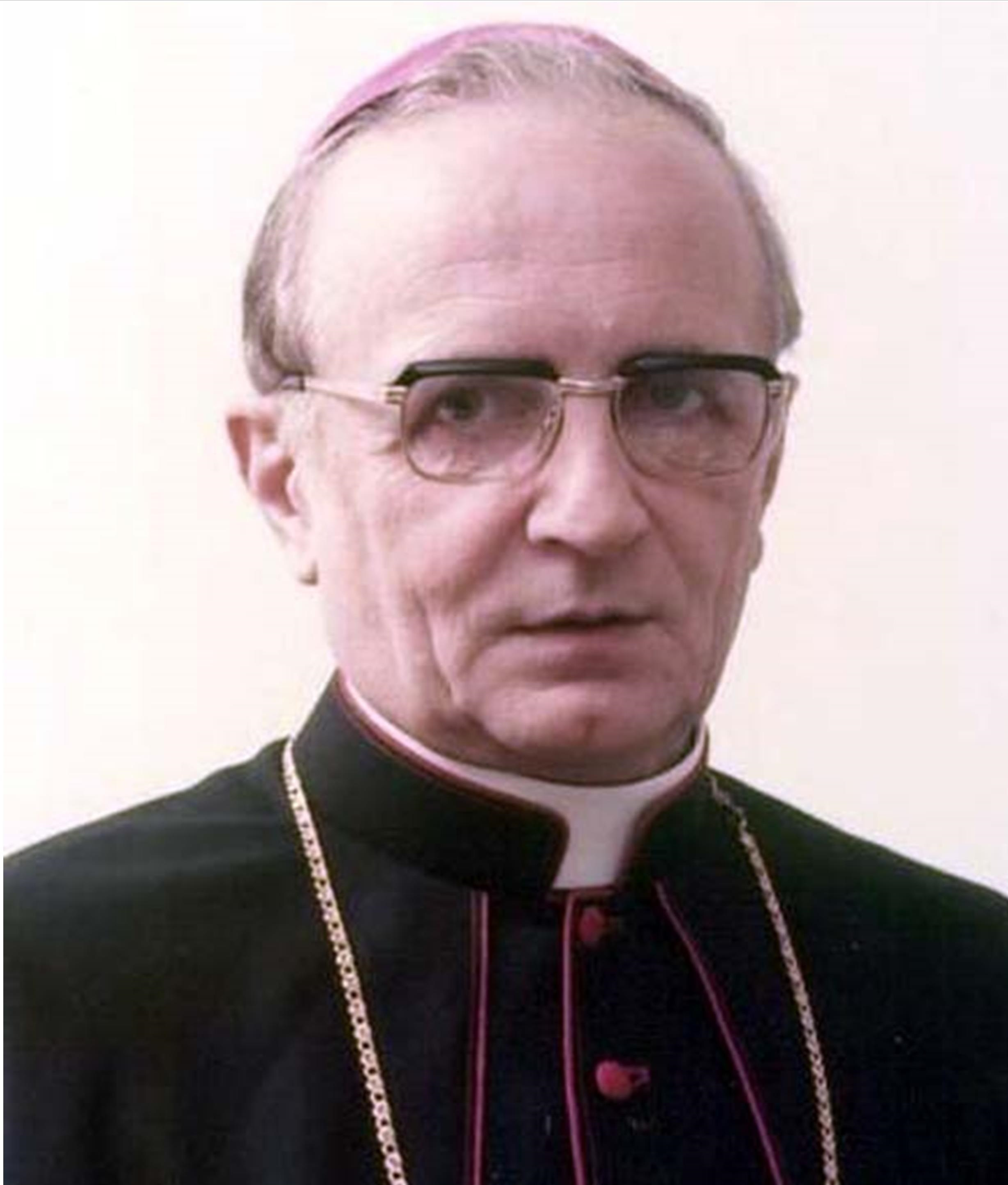

Romeo Panciroli (born 21 November 1923 – 17 March 2006) was an Italian prelate of the Catholic Church who worked in communications until 1984 and then in the diplomatic service of the Holy See.

== Biography ==
He was born in Reggio Emilia on 21 November 1923 and grew up in San Polo d'Enza. On 11 June 1949, he was ordained a priest of the Comboni Missionaries of the Heart of Jesus.

He worked in Verona on the Comboni monthly magazine Nigrizia and then in Rome as secretary to the central committee for the Holy Year of 1950. He returned to Verona and taught ethics and philosophy and moved to Rome again to work for Messis Film, which produced documentaries and films. From 1959 to 1964 he worked at the apostolic delegation in Lagos, Nigeria.

In 1964, he became an official of the Pontifical Council for Social Communications, becoming undersecretary on 7 January 1970 and secretary on 24 September 1973.

On 3 June 1976, Pope Paul VI appointed him interim director of the Holy See Press Office, and on 5 September 1977 he was named director. (Note: He remained secretary of the Pontifical Commission when he became director of the Press Office.)In that role, on 29 September 1978, Panciroli announced the death of Pope John Paul I. He also maintained the traditional style of Vatican press relations, saying only what the moment required. According to one correspondent, journalists gave him the nickname "Monsignore non mi risulta" ("Monsignor I have nothing on that.") (Note: Veteran Vatican journalist Luigi Accattoli described how he parried questions about conflicts and anxieties: "'I can assure you that here the question is not seen this way' was one of his usual answers, always formulated in the mild and firm tone that was characteristic of him.") Another reported: "He always imparted the news with the ponderousness he felt it deserved."

On 6 November 1984, Pope John Paul II appointed him titular archbishop and Apostolic Pro-Nuncio to Liberia and Gambia, as well as Apostolic Delegate to Sierra Leone and Guinea. On 16 December, he received his episcopal consecration from Cardinal Bernardin Gantin.

On 1 August 1987 Pope John Paul appointed him Apostolic Pro-Nuncio to Guinea.

On 18 March 1992 Pope John Paul appointed him Pro-Nuncio, and on February 1 1994 Apostolic Nuncio to Iran.

In April 1999 he returned to Rome and worked in various positions at the Secretariat of State.

He died in Rome 17 March 2006 and was buried in San Polo d'Enza.
