= Gbarnga =

Capital of Bong County, Liberia

Gbarnga Gbanga, Gbanka
- Location in Liberia
- Coordinates: 6°59′53″N 9°28′23″W
- Country: Liberia
- County: Bong County
- Elevation: 250 m (820 ft)

Population (2008)
  - Total: 34,046
- Time zone: UTC±00:00 (GMT)
- Climate: Am

Gbarnga is the capital city of Bong County, Liberia, lying north east of Monrovia. During the First Liberian Civil War, it was the base for Charles Taylor's National Patriotic Front of Liberia. Cuttington College, a private, Episcopal-affiliated institution, is located near the town. Its campus was once home to the Africana Museum, which was destroyed during the civil war.

As of the 2008 census, Gbarnga has a population of 34,046. Of this, 16,080 were male and 17,966 female; it is the fourth-most populous urban area in Liberia.

Gbarnga is the hometown of Tamba Hali, a former professional football player for the Kansas City Chiefs of the National Football League in the United States.

The town is twinned with Baltimore, Maryland, in the United States.

== Climate ==
Köppen-Geiger climate classification system classifies its climate as tropical monsoon (Am). Its climate is similar to the capital Monrovia, but less rainy and with cooler night temperatures.

Climate data for Gbarnga
Month	Jan	Feb	Mar	Apr	May	Jun	Jul	Aug	Sep	Oct	Nov	Dec	Year
Mean daily maximum °C (°F)	32.1 (89.8)	33.1 (91.6)	32.5 (90.5)	32.3 (90.1)	31.3 (88.3)	30.4 (86.7)	29.1 (84.4)	28.1 (82.6)	29.8 (85.6)	31.1 (88.0)	31.3 (88.3)	31.5 (88.7)	31.1 (87.9)
Daily mean °C (°F)	25.1 (77.2)	25.2 (77.4)	25.3 (77.5)	25.7 (78.3)	25.3 (77.5)	24.8 (76.6)	24.1 (75.4)	23.2 (73.8)	24.5 (76.1)	25.5 (77.9)	25.8 (78.4)	25.1 (77.2)	25.0 (76.9)
Mean daily minimum °C (°F)	18.1 (64.6)	17.4 (63.3)	18.1 (64.6)	19.1 (66.4)	19.3 (66.7)	19.2 (66.6)	19.2 (66.6)	18.3 (64.9)	19.2 (66.6)	20 (68)	20.3 (68.5)	18.7 (65.7)	18.9 (66.0)
Average precipitation mm (inches)	20 (0.8)	61 (2.4)	150 (5.9)	179 (7.0)	194 (7.6)	216 (8.5)	221 (8.7)	204 (8.0)	384 (15.1)	236 (9.3)	110 (4.3)	38 (1.5)	2,013 (79.1)
Source: Climate-Data.org, altitude: 250m

== Places of worship ==
- Holy Spirit Cathedral

== Education ==
- Gboveh High School
- St. Martin's Catholic High School
- Williams VS Tubman-Gray united methodist High School
- AB Francis SDA School
- St. Peter Episcopal High School
- Alexandre A. Andrews Academy High School
- Sumo Moye Memorial Institute
- St. Marks Lutheran High School
- St. Paul's Major Catholic Seminary
