= William Tubman =

President of Liberia from 1944 to 1971

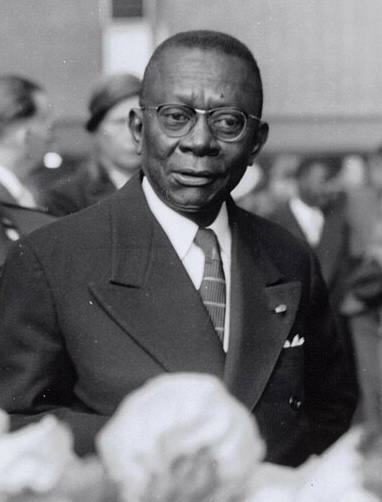
- Tubman in the Netherlands, c. 1956

19th President of Liberia
- In office 3 January 1944 – 23 July 1971
- Vice President: Clarence Lorenzo Simpson (1944–1952); William Tolbert (1952–1971)
- Preceded by: Edwin Barclay
- Succeeded by: William Tolbert

Senator from Maryland County
- In office 1923–1931
- In office 1934–1937

Associate Justice of the Supreme Court
- In office 1937–1943

Personal details
- Born: William Vacanarat Shadrach Tubman; 29 November 1895 Harper, Liberia
- Died: 23 July 1971 (aged 75) London, England
- Party: True Whig
- Spouse(s): Martha Aletha Rhoda Pratt-Tubman Antoinette Tubman (m. 1948)

Military service
- Allegiance: Liberia
- Branch/service: Liberian Frontier Force
- Years of service: 1910–1917
- Rank: Officer

William Vacanarat Shadrach Tubman (29 November 1895 – 23 July 1971) was a Liberian politician. He was the 19th president of Liberia and the longest-serving president in the country's history, serving from his election in 1944 until his death in 1971.

Tubman is regarded as the "father of modern Liberia" in that during his presidency sufficient foreign investment was attracted to modernize the country's economy and infrastructure. During his tenure, Liberia experienced a period of prosperity. He also led a policy of national unification to reduce the social and political differences between his fellow Americo-Liberians and the indigenous Liberians.

== Early life and family background ==
William Tubman was born on 29 November 1895, in Harper, which is located in southeastern Liberia. He was one of 5 children, who grew up poor. He was also a descendant of people who were formerly enslaved in the U.S. Tubman's grandfather, Alexander Tubman, was a stonemason, general in the Liberian army, and a former Speaker of the Liberian House of Representatives, as well as a Methodist preacher. Tubman's father was a strict disciplinarian. He required his five children to attend daily family prayer services, and to sleep on the floor because he thought beds were too soft and "degrading to character development". Tubman's mother, Elizabeth Rebecca (née Barnes) Tubman, was from Atlanta, Georgia. Alexander's parents, Sylvia and William Shadrach Tubman, were freedmen, part of a group of 69 freed slaves whose transportation to Liberia in 1844 was paid by their former mistress Emily Harvie Thomas Tubman, a widow and philanthropist in Augusta, Georgia.

Emily Tubman was instrumental in the manumission of enslaved African Americans and paying for their transportation to Liberia for "repatriation". Initially, she had great difficulty freeing her slaves in ante-bellum Georgia. Despite appeals to the Georgia State Legislature and financial donations to the University of Georgia, her efforts to manumit numerous slaves were disapproved. After Nat Turner's Rebellion in 1831, the state legislature had greatly restricted manumissions, requiring a legislative act for each, and posting of expensive bonds by the owner to guarantee the free black would leave the state within a short period of time.

Tubman sought the help of her friend and mentor, Henry Clay of Kentucky, president of the American Colonization Society. This organization, made up of both abolitionists and slaveholders, had proposed colonization in Africa as a solution for freedmen, rather than allowing them to remain in the United States. Their presence was considered to unsettle slaves in the South, and in both the North and South, lower-class whites resented competing with them for jobs. Clay assured her that sending her former slaves to Liberia would be a safe and suitable option. After arriving in Liberia, this group of freedmen took "Tubman" as their surname and settled together. They named their community Tubman Hill after their benefactress.

== Education ==
William Tubman, the second son, went to primary school in Harper, followed by the Methodist Cape Palmas Seminary, and Harper County High School. Beginning in 1910, when he was 15, he participated in several military operations within the country through 1917, being promoted from private to officer.

Planning to become a preacher, at age 19 Tubman was named as a Methodist lay preacher. After studying law under various private tutors, he passed the bar examination and became a lawyer in 1917.

== Early career ==
Tubman was soon appointed as a recorder in the Maryland County Monthly and Probate Court a tax collector, teacher, and as colonel in a militia.

He was a Freemason and belonged to lodges of Prince Hall Freemasonry.

== Elective office ==
Having joined the True Whig Party (TWP), which had been the dominant political party in Liberia since 1878, Tubman began his career in politics. In 1923, aged 28, he was elected to the Senate of Liberia from Maryland County, holding the record as the youngest senator in the history of Liberia. Identifying as the "Convivial Cannibal from the Downcoast Hinterlands," he fought for constitutional rights for the members of indigenous tribal groups, who comprised the overwhelming number of Liberians.

Re-elected as senator in 1929, Tubman became the legal adviser to vice president Allen Yancy. He resigned from the Senate in 1931 to defend Liberia before the League of Nations amid allegations that his country was using slave labor. Tubman was reelected to the national legislature in 1934; he resigned in 1937 after being appointed by President Edwin Barclay as associate justice of the Supreme Court of Liberia, where he served until 1943. An official biography speculates that Barclay appointed Tubman to the Liberian Supreme Court to remove him as a competitor for the presidency.

== President of Liberia ==
In December 1942, Liberia had to elect a successor to President Edwin Barclay. Six candidates ran for office; the two favorites were Tubman and Foreign Minister Clarence L. Simpson. Tubman was elected president on 4 May 1943, at the age of 48, and was inaugurated 3 January 1944.

While the United States, its ally, began to base military operations in the country after it entered World War II, Liberia did not declare war on Germany and Japan until 27 January 1944. In April 1944, Liberia joined the Allied cause by signing the Declaration by United Nations.

Choosing to sever diplomatic relations with Germany and expel German citizens from Liberia was a difficult decision for Tubman for economic and social reasons: (1) German merchants were integral to the Liberian economy; (2) Germany was Liberia's major trading partner; and (3), most of the doctors in Liberia were Germans. Under the above declaration, Tubman agreed to expel all German residents and oppose the Axis powers.

=== Foreign relations ===
Liberian policy is committed to the concept of a free enterprise system, democracy, and a pragmatic search for solutions to problems of multinational existence. We envisage a synthesis composed of individual states retaining their own way of life, but united by mutual exchanges of peoples, goods and ideas, by pacts of non-aggression, non-interference in the internal affairs of other states, and of perpetual peace.

— William Tubman

In foreign policy, Tubman aligned his country with the US, which he hailed as "Our strongest, closest, and most reliable friend." In June 1944, he and former president Edwin Barclay traveled to the White House as guests of President Franklin D. Roosevelt, and became the first African heads of state to be received there. Following the war, which resulted in an anti-colonial movement on the African continent, Tubman strengthened ties among fellow Africans by participating in the Asian-African Conference of 1955, and the First Conference of Independent African States in Accra, organized in 1958 by Kwame Nkrumah of Ghana. In 1959, Tubman organized the Second Conference of African States.

In 1951 the United States and Liberia signed a mutual agreement of defense.

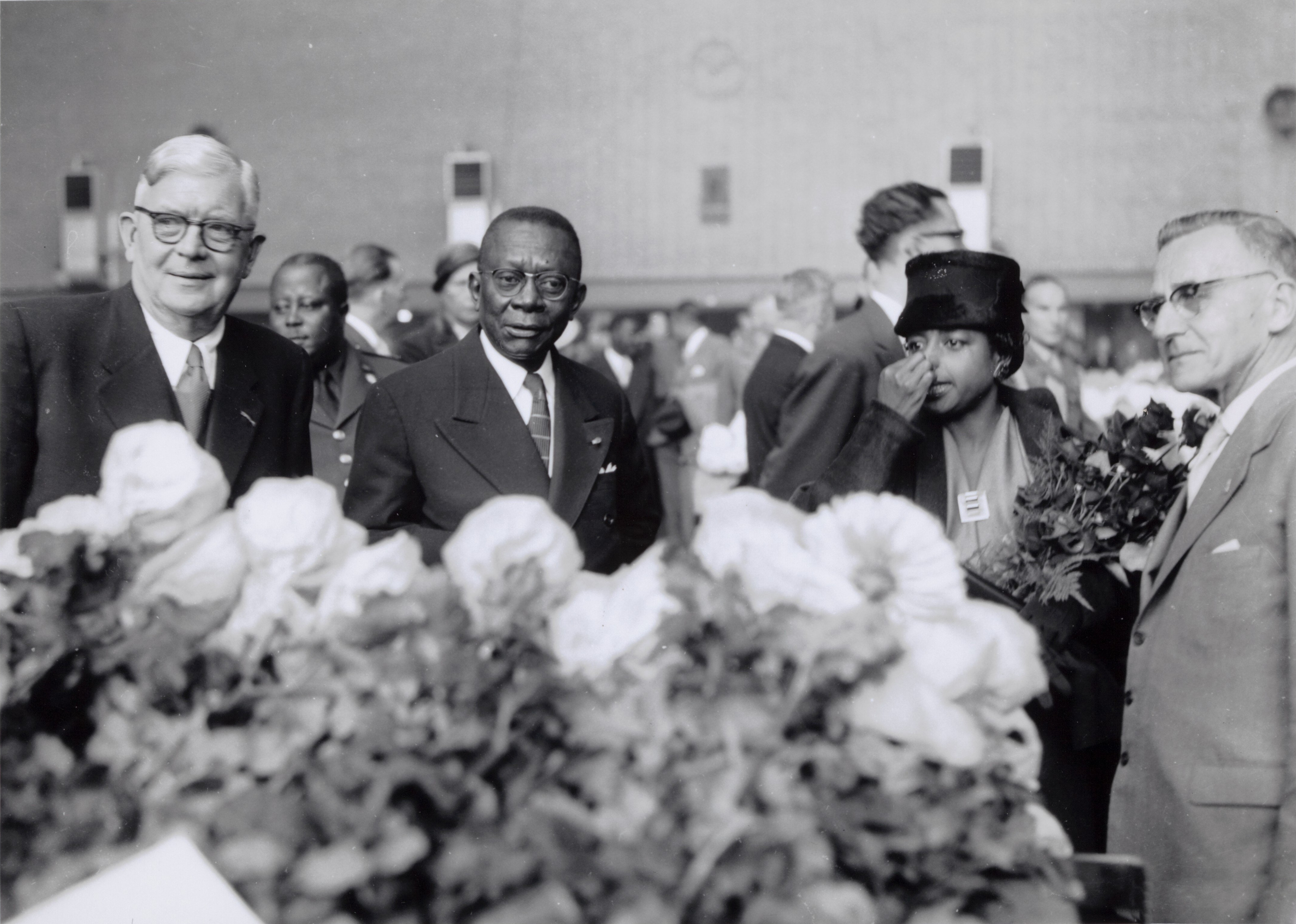
Tubman in the Netherlands as president.

In 1957, the United States erected a Voice of America relay facility, one of several U.S. communications facilities to be placed on Liberian soil during the Cold War.

In 1961, following a Pan-African conference held in Monrovia, Tubman helped to found the African Union. This association of "moderate" African leaders worked for gradual unification of Africa, unlike the "revolutionary" group based at Casablanca.

We wage no war against socialism if it is kept within the territories and among people that are so inclined, but we shall fight till death any attempt to impose and force upon us what we consider a mystical illusion.

— Tubman

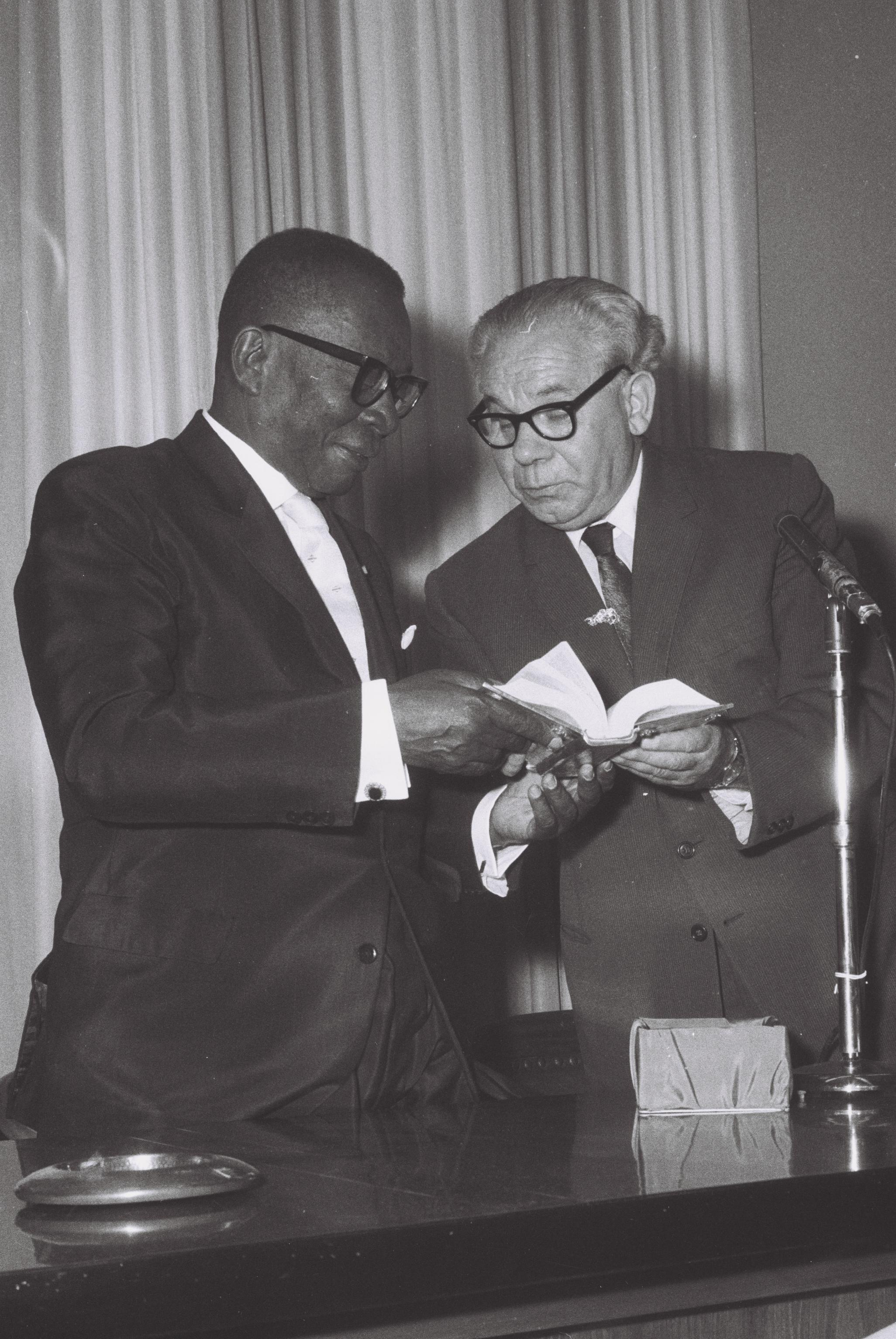
William Tubman 1962.

A U.S. Peace Corps program began in Liberia which would run until 1990 when Civil war broke out.

Tubman's government was critical of communism, and avoided establishing diplomatic relations with most of the communist countries (Yugoslavia, which was regarded highly by the Liberian government, was the lone exception); however, Liberia did exchange trade and goodwill missions with the Soviet Union and other Eastern European states.

=== Economic development ===
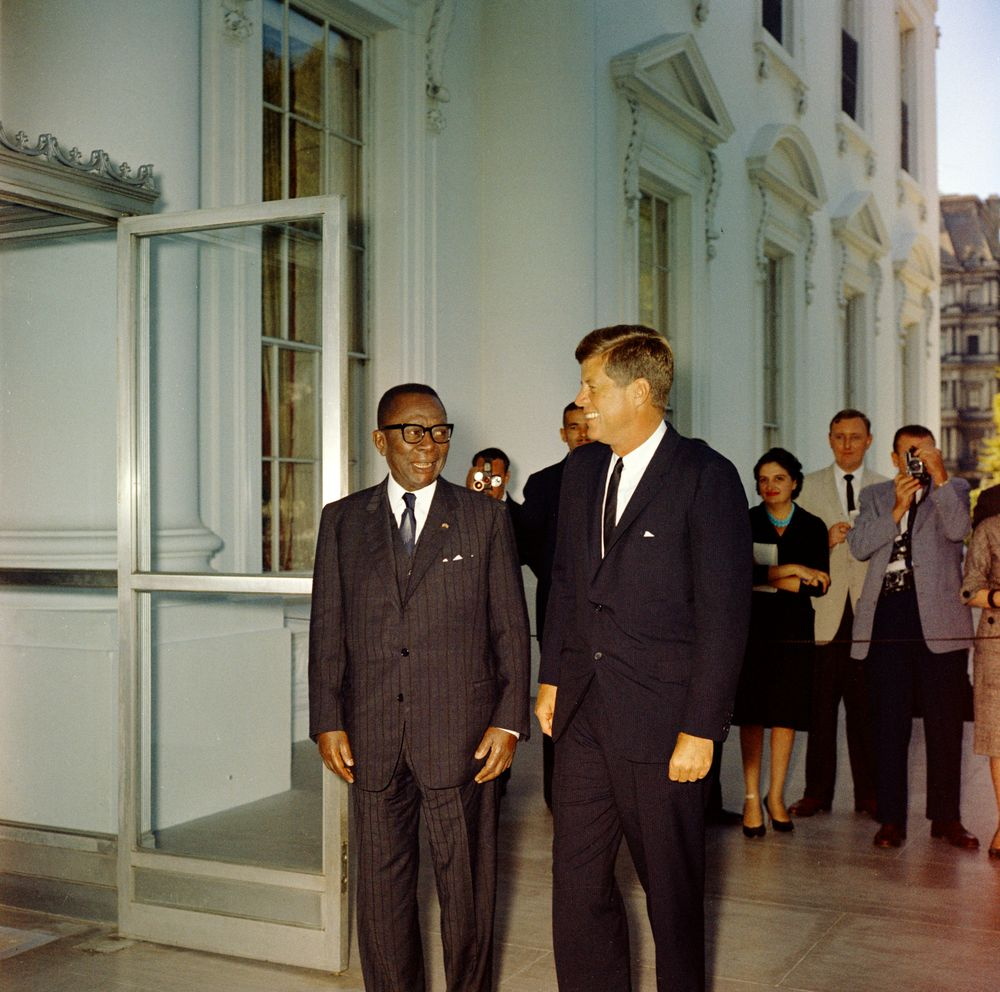
William Tubman and John F. Kennedy at the White House in 1961

When Tubman was appointed to the Supreme Court in the 1930s, Liberia was seriously underdeveloped, lacking basic infrastructure of roads, railways, and sanitation systems. Tubman said that Liberia had never received the "benefits of colonization", by which he meant the investment by a wealthy major power to develop the infrastructure of the country. He established an economic policy, known as the "porte ouverte" ("open door"), to attract foreign investment. Working to facilitate and encourage foreign businesses to locate in Liberia, he encouraged development. Between 1944 and 1970, the value of foreign investments, mainly from the United States, increased by 200%. From 1950 to 1960, Liberia experienced an average annual growth of 11.5%.

With the expansion of the economy, Tubman gained revenues for the government to construct and modernize infrastructure: the streets of Monrovia were paved, a public sanitation system was installed, hospitals were built, and a literacy program was launched in 1948. During Tubman's administration, several thousand kilometers of roads were built, as was a railway line to connect the iron mines to the coast for transport of this commodity for export. During this period, he transformed the Port of Monrovia into a free port to encourage trade.

By early 1960, Liberia began to enjoy its first era of prosperity, thanks in part to Tubman's policies and implementation of development. It was during this time that Tubman became regarded as a pro-Western, stabilizing influence in West Africa, at a period when other countries were achieving independence—often amid violence. During the 1960s, Tubman was courted by many Western politicians, notably U.S. President Lyndon B. Johnson.

In the past, the bulk of Liberia's production depended on rubber. But with the modernization of the state's infrastructure at the hands of Tubman, Liberia started to use its other national resources. Several Americo-Liberian nationalities, German, and Swedish companies became involved in the exploitation of iron mines—making Liberia the first source of iron in Africa, and the fourth worldwide. Tubman wanted to diversify the economy, rather than basing it on rubber and iron resources, which made up 90% of the country's exports. He encouraged the development of coffee plantations, palm oil, sugar cane, and especially rice cultivation in 1966 (with the help of Taiwan).

In his personal life, Tubman courted Amy Ashwood Garvey, and had a long-term relationship with her.

=== Role in the Cold War ===
As World War II gave way to the Cold War, the United States viewed Liberia as an ideal post from which to fight the spread of communism through Africa. Under Tubman, Liberia voted with the U.S. on most key matters at the United Nations, albeit it sometimes sided with other African states, particularly on decolonization and anti-apartheid issues. Tubman gradually extended ties to the Soviet bloc, but he supported the United States on the Vietnam War, as did his successor, William R. Tolbert.

=== Assessment ===
His former ally and later political opponent S. David Coleman and his son John were hunted down and killed by Liberian soldiers for allegedly plotting to overthrow him. The Coleman funeral was poorly attended, as people were afraid of being seen as Coleman sympathizers. That same year the constitution was changed to allow Tubman to stay in office for more than two terms.

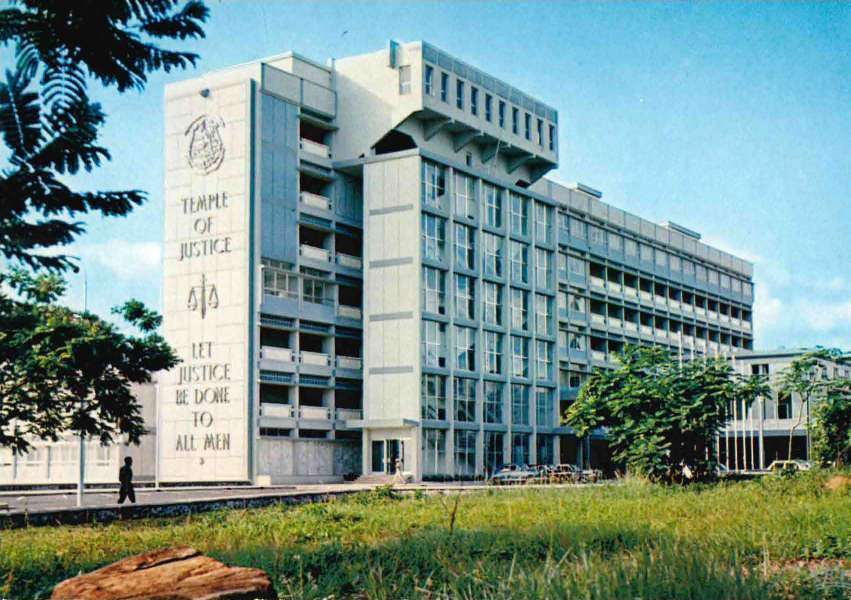
Temple of Justice c.1960s.

In 1961 Tubman declared a state of emergency after riots and a strike took place. In July 1965, Raymond J. Horace and three other individuals involved in the 1955 attempted assassination of Tubman were released from prison. As a result of labor unrest, Tubman was granted emergency powers by the parliament for twelve months.

By the time Tubman died, Liberia had the largest mercantile fleet in the world.

== See also ==
- History of Liberia
- Americo-Liberians
- President of Liberia
- William Tolbert
- Tubmanburg

Political offices
| Preceded by Edwin Barclay | President of Liberia; 1944–1971 | Succeeded by William Tolbert |
