= Outline of Liberia =

Overview of and topical guide to Liberia

The Flag of Liberia

The Coat of arms of Liberia

The location of Liberia

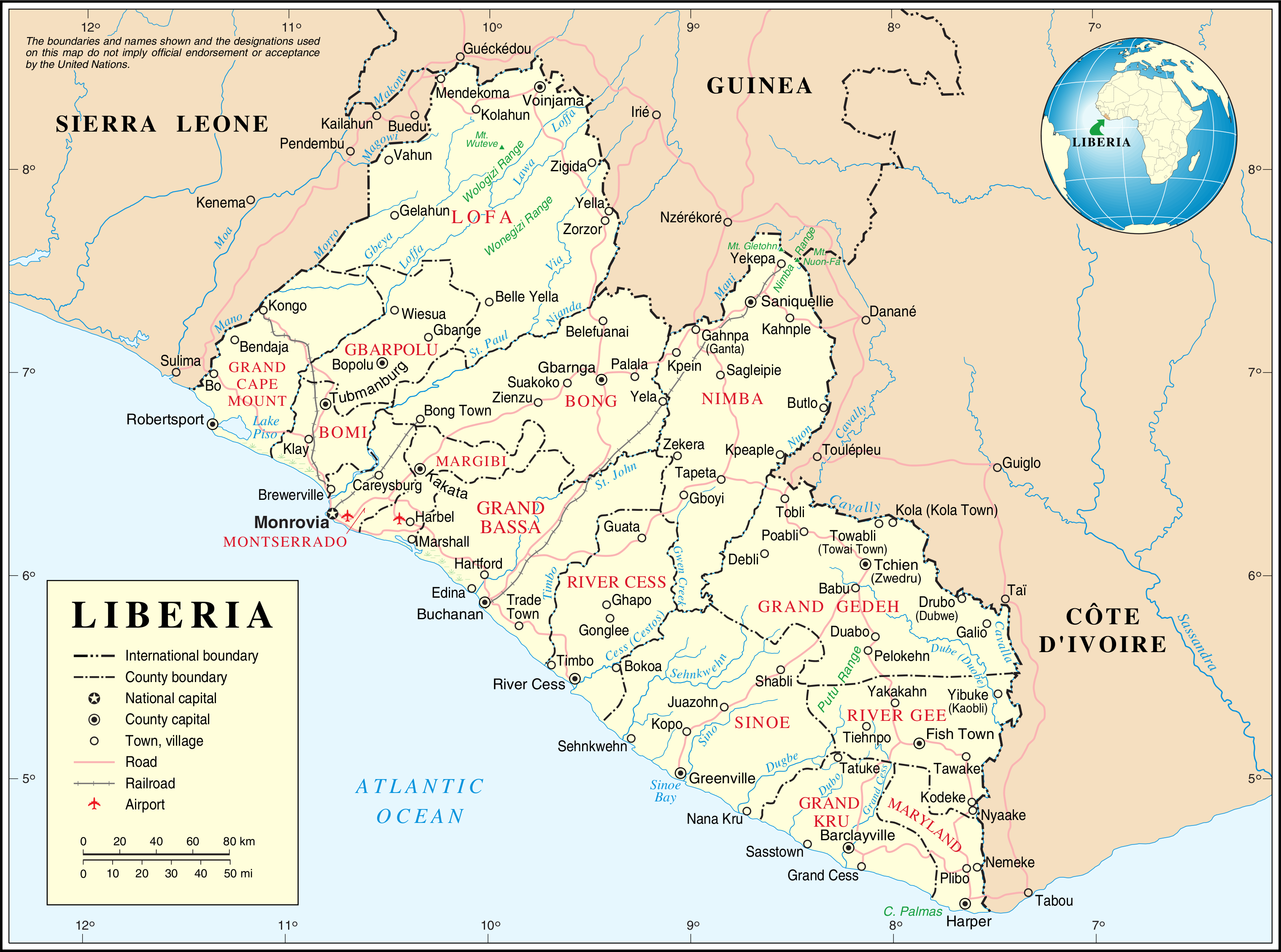
An enlargeable map of the Republic of Liberia

The following outline is provided as an overview of and topical guide to Liberia:

Liberia – a country in West Africa, bordered by Sierra Leone, Guinea, Côte d'Ivoire, and the Atlantic Ocean. Liberia has a hot equatorial climate with most rainfall arriving in summer with harsh harmattan winds in the dry season. Liberia's populated Pepper Coast is composed of mostly mangrove forests while the sparse inland is forested, later opening to a plateau of drier grasslands. Since 1989, Liberia has been in a state of flux witnessing two civil wars, the First Liberian Civil War (1989–1996), and the Second Liberian Civil War (1999–2003), displacing hundreds of thousands of people and devastating the country's economy.

== General reference ==
An enlargeable map of Liberia

- Pronunciation: /laɪˈbɪəriə/
- Common English country name: Liberia
- Official English country name: The Republic of Liberia
- Common endonym(s):
- Official endonym(s):
- Adjectival(s): Liberian
- Demonym(s): Liberian(s)
- Etymology: Name of Liberia
- ISO country codes: LR, LBR, 430
- ISO region codes: See ISO 3166-2:LR
- Internet country code top-level domain: .lr

== Geography of Liberia ==
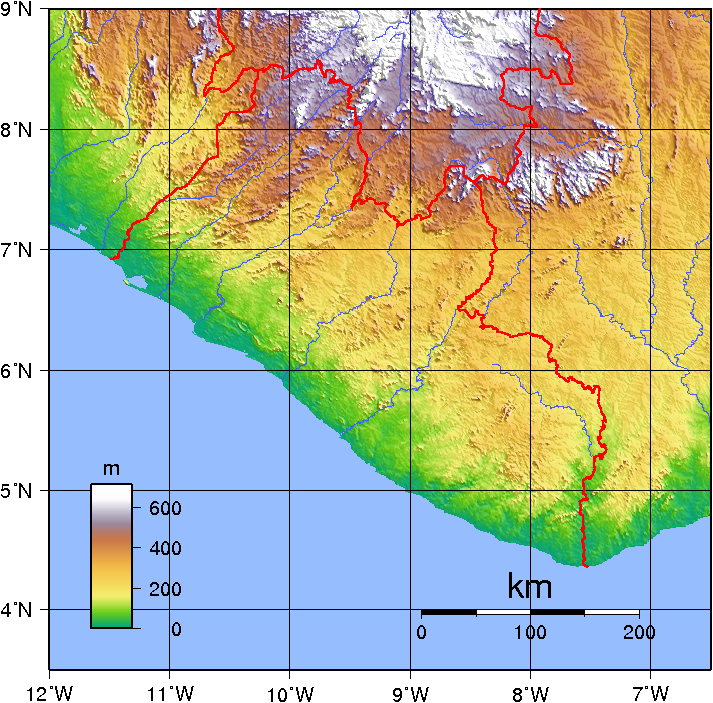
An enlargeable topographic map of Liberia

- Liberia is: a country
- Population of Liberia: 3,750,000 - 129th most populous country
- Area of Liberia: 111,369 km^{2}
- Atlas of Liberia

=== Location ===
- Liberia is situated within the following regions:
  - Northern Hemisphere and Western Hemisphere
    - Africa
      - West Africa
- Time zone: Coordinated Universal Time UTC+00
- Extreme points of Liberia
  - High: Mount Wuteve 1,440 m (4,724 ft)
  - Low: North Atlantic Ocean 0 m
- Land boundaries: 1,585 km

Côte d'Ivoire 716 km
Guinea 563 km
Sierra Leone 306 km

- Coastline: North Atlantic Ocean 579 km

=== Environment of Liberia ===
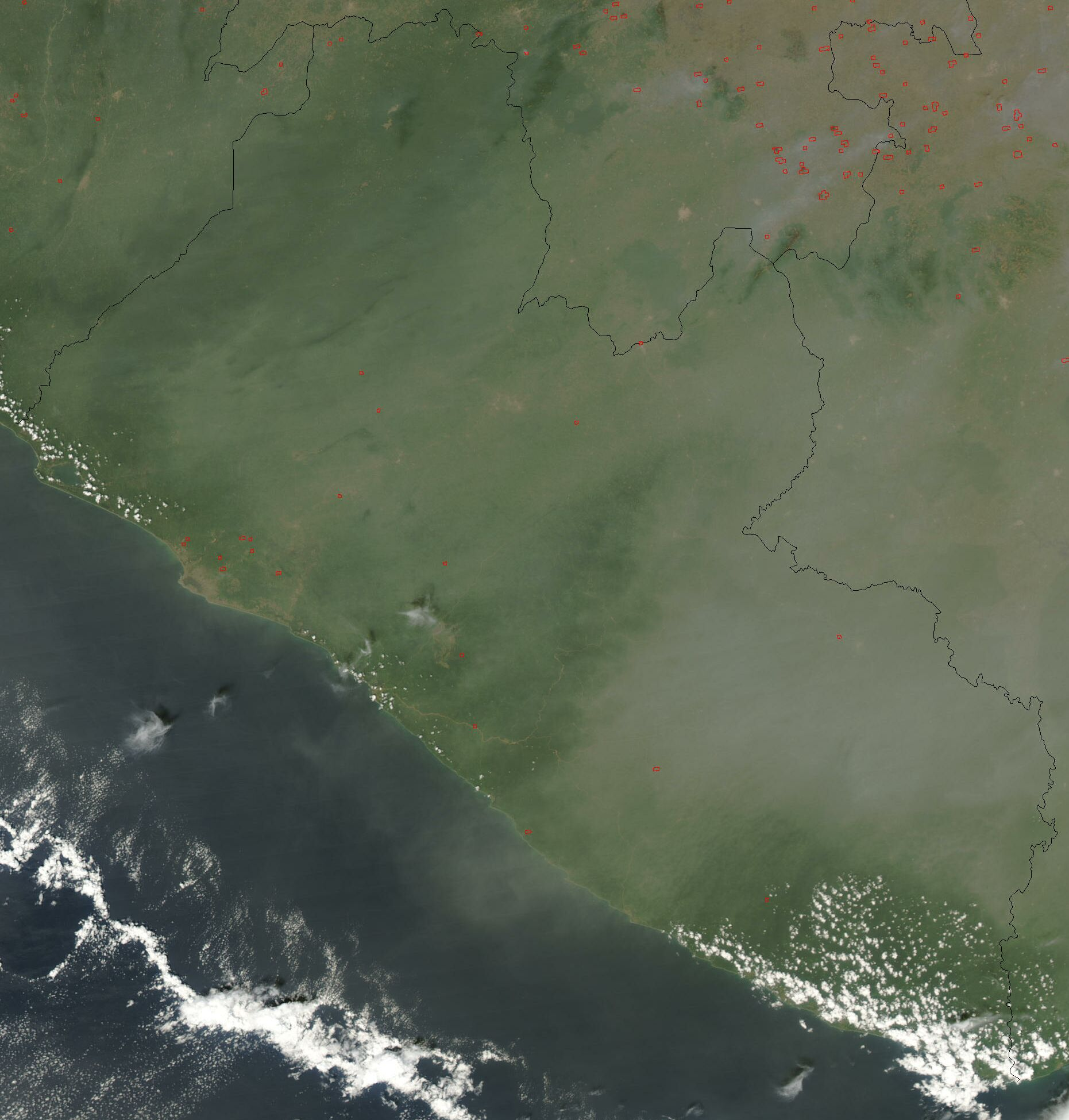
An enlargeable satellite image of Liberia

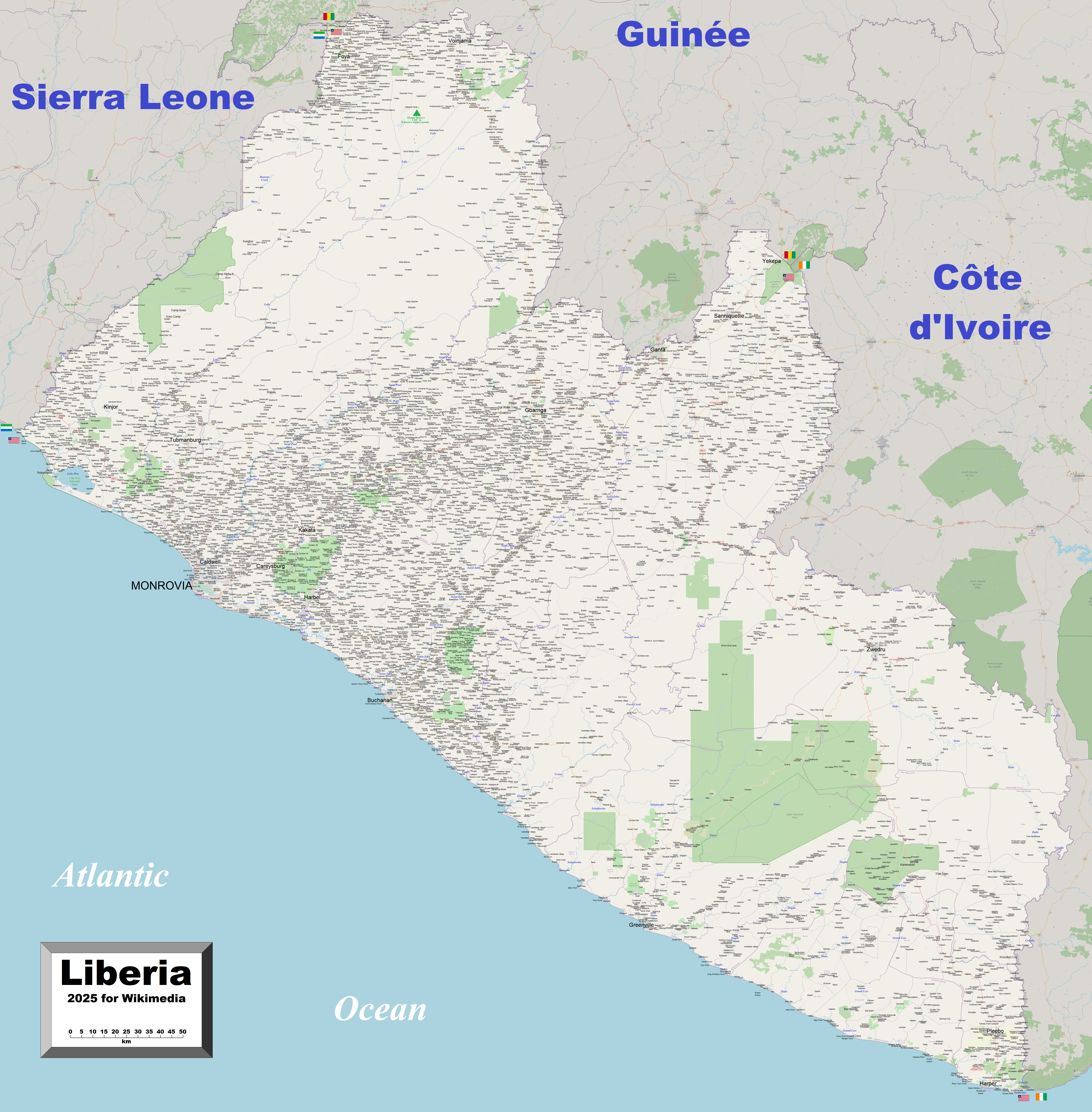
An enlargeable map of Liberia's cities, towns and many villages

- Climate of Liberia
- Wildlife of Liberia
  - Fauna of Liberia
    - Birds of Liberia
    - Mammals of Liberia

==== Natural geographic features of Liberia ====
- Glaciers in Liberia: none
- Rivers of Liberia
- World Heritage Sites in Liberia: None

=== Regions of Liberia ===
==== Administrative divisions of Liberia ====
- Counties of Liberia
  - Bomi County
  - Bong County
  - Gbarpolu County
  - Grand Bassa County
  - Grand Cape Mount County
  - Grand Gedeh County
  - Grand Kru County
  - Lofa County
  - Margibi County
  - Maryland County
  - Montserrado County
  - Nimba County
  - Rivercess County
  - Sinoe County

Districts of Liberia

Clans of Liberia

- Capital of Liberia: Monrovia
- Cities of Liberia

=== Demography of Liberia ===
Demographics of Liberia

== Government and politics of Liberia ==
- Form of government: presidential representative democratic republic modeled on the government of the United States
- Capital of Liberia: Monrovia
- Elections in Liberia
- Political parties in Liberia

=== Branches of the government of Liberia ===
Government of Liberia

==== Executive branch of the government of Liberia ====
- Head of state and head of government: President of Liberia, Joseph Boakai
  - Vice President of Liberia, Jeremiah Koung
- Cabinet of Liberia

==== Legislative branch of the government of Liberia ====
- Parliament of Liberia (bicameral)
  - Upper house: Senate of Liberia
  - Lower house: House of Representatives of Liberia

==== Judicial branch of the government of Liberia ====
Court system of Liberia

- Supreme Court of Liberia

=== Foreign relations of Liberia ===
Foreign relations of Liberia

- Diplomatic missions in Liberia
- Diplomatic missions of Liberia

==== International organization membership ====
The Republic of Liberia is a member of:

- African, Caribbean, and Pacific Group of States (ACP)
- African Development Bank Group (AfDB)
- African Union (AU)
- Economic Community of West African States (ECOWAS)
- Food and Agriculture Organization (FAO)
- Group of 77 (G77)
- International Atomic Energy Agency (IAEA)
- International Bank for Reconstruction and Development (IBRD)
- International Civil Aviation Organization (ICAO)
- International Criminal Court (ICCt)
- International Criminal Police Organization (Interpol)
- International Development Association (IDA)
- International Federation of Red Cross and Red Crescent Societies (IFRCS)
- International Finance Corporation (IFC)
- International Fund for Agricultural Development (IFAD)
- International Labour Organization (ILO)
- International Maritime Organization (IMO)
- International Mobile Satellite Organization (IMSO)
- International Monetary Fund (IMF)
- International Olympic Committee (IOC)
- International Organization for Migration (IOM)
- International Red Cross and Red Crescent Movement (ICRM)
- International Telecommunication Union (ITU)
- International Trade Union Confederation (ITUC)
- Inter-Parliamentary Union (IPU)
- Multilateral Investment Guarantee Agency (MIGA)
- Nonaligned Movement (NAM)
- Organisation for the Prohibition of Chemical Weapons (OPCW)
- United Nations (UN)
- United Nations Conference on Trade and Development (UNCTAD)
- United Nations Educational, Scientific, and Cultural Organization (UNESCO)
- United Nations Industrial Development Organization (UNIDO)
- Universal Postal Union (UPU)
- World Confederation of Labour (WCL)
- World Customs Organization (WCO)
- World Federation of Trade Unions (WFTU)
- World Health Organization (WHO)
- World Intellectual Property Organization (WIPO)
- World Meteorological Organization (WMO)
- World Trade Organization (WTO)

=== Law and order in Liberia ===
Law of Liberia

- Constitution of Liberia
- Human rights in Liberia
  - LGBT rights in Liberia
  - Gender Equality in Liberia
  - Disability in Liberia
  - Human trafficking in Liberia
- Law enforcement in Liberia

=== Military of Liberia ===
Military of Liberia

- Command
  - Commander-in-chief: President of Liberia
- Forces
  - Army of Liberia
- Military history of Liberia

== History of Liberia ==
History of Liberia

- Military history of Liberia

== Culture of Liberia ==
Culture of Liberia

- Cuisine of Liberia
- Languages of Liberia
- National symbols of Liberia
  - Coat of arms of Liberia
  - Flag of Liberia
  - National anthem of Liberia
- Prostitution in Liberia
- Public holidays in Liberia
- Religion in Liberia
  - Hinduism in Liberia
  - Islam in Liberia
- World Heritage Sites in Liberia: None

=== Art in Liberia ===
- Cinema of Liberia
- Music of Liberia

=== Sports in Liberia ===
Sports in Liberia

- Football in Liberia
- Liberia at the Olympics

== Economy and infrastructure of Liberia ==
- Economic rank, by nominal GDP (2025): 161st (one hundred and sixty-first)
- Agriculture in Liberia
- Communications in Liberia
  - Internet in Liberia
- Companies of Liberia
- Currency of Liberia: Dollar & Dollar
- ISO 4217: LRD & USD
- Energy in Liberia
- Health care in Liberia
  - Abortion in Liberia
- Mining in Liberia
- Tourism in Liberia
- Transport in Liberia
  - Airports in Liberia
  - Rail transport in Liberia

== Education in Liberia ==
- List of universities in Liberia
- List of schools in Liberia

== See also ==
Liberia

- List of international rankings
- List of Liberia-related topics
- Member state of the United Nations
- Outline of Africa
- Outline of geography
