= Gender inequality in Liberia =

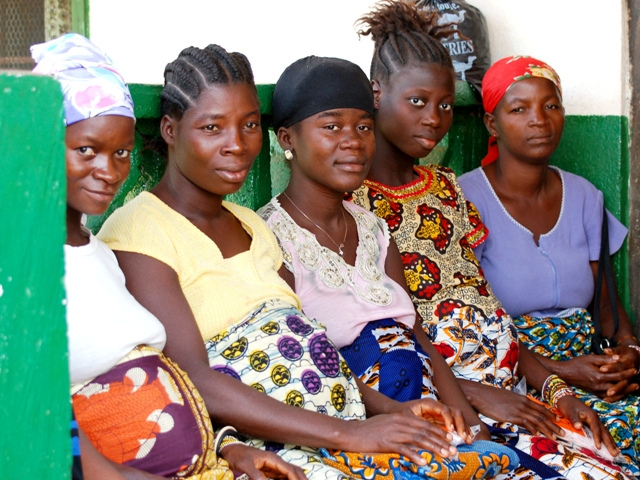
Liberian women, 2008.

The extent of gender inequalities varies throughout Liberia in regard to status, region, rural/urban areas, and traditional cultures. In general, women in Liberia have less access to education, health care, property, and justice when compared to men. Liberia suffered two devastating civil wars from 1989–1996 and 1999–2003. The wars left Liberia nearly destroyed with minimal infrastructure and thousands dead. Liberia has a Human Development Report ranking of 174 out of 187 and a Gender Inequality Index rank of 154 out of 159.

Despite the progress of Liberia's economy since the end of its second civil war in 2003, it remains one of the poorest countries in the world today with high levels of poverty and deprivation, exacerbated by economic crises and increasing food prices.

== Gender roles ==
In Liberia, men and women have clear gender divisions of labor. Women typically clean, cook, and take care of children, but their contributions to the family are rarely recognized as work. Men are seen as the head of the households and the breadwinners. Women are held back in society by biases in education, health care, land ownership, and credit, along with cultural practices like pre-arranged marriages and female genital mutilation.

These factors constrain women from entering the workforce. The traditional role of women as caregivers in Liberian society is an example of Martha Nussbaum's idea of a resource-based approach, favoring protection of the status quo.

=== Shifts toward gender equality in Liberia ===
After the UN signed the peace treaty with Liberia in 2003, the gender roles that restricted women from achieving equality began to change. After the wars in Liberia ended, initially, there was little to no participation from women in positions of power, organizations or in government. Now, there are over 100 women's organizations according to the Women's NGO Secretariat of Liberia (WONGOSOL). These organizations serve to feed funds to local powerful women leaders. In comparison to other countries affected by wars, women in Liberia have been successful in making their voices heard in politics despite male resistance.

In terms of women in politics, Liberia had elected their first female president Ellen Johnson Sirleaf in 2006, a step toward progress in a developing country. Recently, the National Institute for Public Opinion (NIPO) has raised awareness of women empowerment and equality through organizing the 16 Days of Activism against Gender-based Violence. Through this month long campaign, it brought awareness to the legalities women were entitled to both nationally and internationally as well as female participation in politics and policy making.

On a more international scale, with assistance from Sweden, UN women have reached out to men to join the fight against gender-based violence. As part of the campaign, twelve men were nominated to become ambassadors to bring awareness and encourage other men to take a stand against violence against women. While there has been some progress, in order to fulfill the MDG development goal of promoting gender equality and empowering women there are still some areas to improve on such as addressing the gender discrimination in law, unequal job opportunities and wage gaps as well as a lack of equal women's participation in decision making.

== Violence against women ==
=== Sexual violence during the Liberian Civil Wars ===
During the First Liberian Civil War, there were widespread reports of sexual violence towards women. After the war, a survey taken of 205 women in the capital city of Monrovia showed that 49% experienced at least one type of physical or sexual violence by a soldier; 17% reported being beaten, tied up, or detained by an armed guard; 32% were strip-searched; and 15% experienced rape, attempted rape, or sexual coercion. Sexual coercion refers to a forced sexual relationship between a soldier and a woman who is forced into the relationship because of wartime conditions in order to feed herself or her family, to have shelter and clothing, or for protection and safety.

After the Second Liberian Civil War, the International Rescue Committee reported that it had assisted almost 1,000 women and girls who had suffered gender-based violence in Montserrado County. 63% of the assaults were rapes. The IRC also surveyed Liberian women and girls between the ages of 15 and 49 in refugee camps in Sierra Leone. 74% of those surveyed reported having been subject to sexual violence. The majority of incidents were improper sexual comments, with sexual touching, stripping, and cavity searches also common.

Post-War Gender Violence Outcome

After the wars ended, the opening ceremony of the peace negotiations was held on June 4, 2003 in Ghana, Liberia. A significant issue during these negotiations for peace is that there were none addressing the sexual violence crimes suffered by both women and children, land rights or even a discussion to include women's rights to education, despite five women being present during these negotiations. Despite Liberia passing the Rape Amendment Act in 2006 to impose stricter punishments and offering no bail to accused rapists, it was found that many women's groups had never even seen the new law.

One solution that was offered in December 2008 was the creation of a rape court in order to fast track rape cases to give the victims closure. However due to the weaknesses and corruptions of the court system, many victims and their families were reluctant to press charges due to the system ruling in favor of men. While this is a step to improve the quality of life for women it does not solve the problem of sexual violence.

=== Women soldiers ===
Women and girls were abducted in the thousands and forced to fight and move supplies. Many of the older girls and women were sent directly to the front line without receiving any military training. A woman resisting or refusing a commander's orders risked being beaten, raped or killed.

=== Ethnic violence ===
Women belonging (or accused of belonging) to certain ethnic groups or factions had an increased risk for sexual violence, being forced to cook for soldiers or becoming sex slaves. In a 1998 survey of 106 women in Monrovia accused of being an ethnic group or faction member- 61% reported being beaten, locked up, strip searched, or raped. Women forced to cook for soldiers had even higher chances of sexual coercion or rape.

== Female genital mutilation ==
Female genital mutilation is prevalent in some ethnic groups throughout Liberia. The civil wars led to a decrease in female genital mutilation due to upheaval of life in rural areas, but the practice is still common. A 2007 study indicates that 52.8% of women ages 15–29 in the Sande Society have been subjected to female genital mutilation. The majority of victims do not speak out against the practice for fear of being ostracized or killed by community members.

== Education ==
=== Inequalities ===
When it comes to education in Liberia, boys are favored over girls to go to school. In most cases the extended family will fund the education for boys but rarely girls. This is an example of Amartya Sen's theory of Special Opportunity Inequality: education opportunities are less for girls than for boy in both primary and secondary education. The reason for education inequality of boys over girls is typically families believe an educated woman will take her education to her husband's family, resulting in a loss to their family. Regardless of sex, if the family is able to pay for a child's education they are usually steered toward gender specific occupation. Boys are taught the sciences and mathematics while girls are taught nursing and teaching.

In 2007, the literacy rate for adult men was 55% and women was 41%. "Literacy (and education in general) is very much connected to women's ability to form social relationships on a basis of equality with other and to achieve the important social good of self-respect." "Illiteracy, moreover, is strongly linked, as I have already argued, to other forms of injustice: domestic violence without exit options and unequal political and employment opportunities." - Martha Nussbaum

=== Education laws ===
In 2001 an education law was enacted making primary education free and compulsory, though resources have not been adequate to implement the policy nationwide. Since her election in 2006, President Ellen Johnson Sirleaf has worked to promote school enrollment. In 2012 primary school enrollment in urban areas was 63.7% for girls and 86.8% for boys, in rural areas it was 33.1% for girls and 44.9% for boys.

The reason for the gender inequality is that boys are seen to be more likely to use their education to contribute to household wealth. As a result of the education law, youths who had previously little or no access to education have been returning to school. A 2006 school census showed that 15% of the students in primary school were ages 6 to 7 years old, and half of the students were ages 11 to 20.

=== Reasons for low education ===
The main contributors to the overall low levels of education for Liberians is the lack of infrastructure in schools, security problems across the country and the high cost of education. A 2006 census from the Liberian Ministry of Education found that one in five schools in Liberia had been destroyed during the wars. Many schools were without water and restrooms, along with more than 60% of teachers lacking formal qualifications and being paid very low salaries (200–300 USD per year).

For people living in indigenous/rural areas there are many reasons for low levels of education including, limited access to schools, curriculum not being seen as relevant for rural life, the expense of sending children to urban areas for school, the belief that education will alienate their children from cultural values and in the case of girls, the belief that modern careers favor men.

== Health ==
=== Fertility rate ===
The fertility rate has been slowly declining from 6.9 births per woman in 1984 to 5.4 in 2007 and 5.2 in 2012. Although fertility rates are decreasing in Liberia, its population growth rate is 2.6%, meaning that Liberia is one of the fastest growing nations in Africa. This growth is caused by a large percent of the female population being of reproductive age, along with early marriage practices (approximately 48% married by age 18 in 2007) and widespread polygamy, especially in rural areas. Contraceptive use is low among women from poor households and unmarried women, with an estimated prevalence rate of 11%.

=== Maternal health ===
Maternal mortality is a major problem in Liberia, in 2010 there were 770 deaths per 100,000 live births. The devastating Liberian Civil Wars destroyed the country's health infrastructure. Even finding accurate numbers on maternal mortality is difficult because most cases go unreported, along with problems recording traditional births.

=== HIV/AIDS ===
The transmission of HIV in Sub-Saharan Africa is primarily through heterosexual intercourse, mother-to-child transmission, and contaminated blood and unsterilized medical equipment. With greater use of health services during pregnancy, there is a higher chance of HIV infection due to contaminated equipment. The risk of HIV increases with malnutrition and parasite-burdened people, which is a very real problem for the citizens of Liberia. There is a widely held belief across Sub-Saharan Africa that sex with a virgin cures HIV. The HIV/AIDS prevalence in Liberia is low, at 1.5%.

In areas where women are not allowed to own land, they have less of an ability to practice safe sex without risking fear of abandonment. In 2004 the United Nations Development Program gave Liberia $24 million in funding to aid in the treatment of individuals with HIV/AIDS, many of which were victims of sexual violence.

== Legal framework ==
=== Civil and customary laws ===
Liberia operates on a dual system of law. Civil law is based on Anglo-American ideals, and customary law is based on customs and unwritten tribal practices. Because of this system women are subject to more inequalities when living in rural/tribal areas. Customary law is the default except when it conflicts with the constitution. However, in practice, customary laws conflicting with the constitution generally go unchecked by the statutory system. Customary law regards women as property of their husbands, because of this, women rarely have a role in family decisions.

=== Civil rights ===
Under the civil law, men and women share the same legal rights. Women are able to inherit land or property, take out bank loans, and have custody over children. Under customary law women cannot inherit land or property and have no rights to custody or parental authority. Liberian women have had the right to vote since 1949.

=== Marriage ===
There are gender inequalities in marriage law because the minimum legal age of marriage is 18 for women and 21 for men. One third of married women in the age group 15-49, are in polygamous marriages. In 2004 the United Nations estimated that 36% of girls from 15-19 were married, divorced or widowed. While polygamy in Liberia is illegal under civil law, customary law allows men to have up to 4 wives. Customary law restricts a married woman's rights to inherit property from her spouse. When widowed, women are at the mercy of the customary laws that are not subject to the civil courts.

=== Bodily integrity ===
The law does not protect a woman's bodily integrity in Liberia. Though violence against women is illegal, the levels of domestic violence and sexual assault are high. The definition of rape was broadened in 2006 to make spousal rape a criminal offense. Martha Nussbaum describes bodily integrity in her capabilities approach as "being able to move freely from place to place; to be secure against violent assault, including sexual assault and domestic violence; having opportunities for sexual satisfaction and choice in matters of reproduction."

Education plays a significant part in a woman's bodily integrity. As women become more educated, they take charge of decisions affecting their lives that once may have been made by their husbands, family members, or by social norms. Nussbaum says that "the role of education in developing central human capabilities in no sense implies that, without education, women do not have selves worthy of respect or basic human dignity."

== Women in politics ==
The role women have played in Liberian politics has been substantial. Women helped to end the Second Liberian Civil War with the Mass Action for Peace Movement in 2003 led by Leymah Gbowee. Women's participation in politics has risen to 13.5% in 2011. Liberia ranks 90 out of 193 for female representation.

== Feminist movement ==
In 1920 the women's movement organized in the National Liberian Women's Social and Political Movement, who campaigned without success for women's suffrage, followed by the Liberia Women's League and the Liberian Women's Social and Political Movement; in 1946, limited suffrage was finally introduced for women of the privileged Libero-American elite, and expanded to universal women's suffrage in 1951.

== Women in indigenous society ==
=== Grebo people ===
The Grebo are an indigenous people inhabiting southeastern Liberia. Grebo society exhibits social stratification based on access to resources, land ownership, and political influence. Higher-status families typically possess greater control over land and political institutions, while lower-status groups may have less access to economic opportunities.

In lower-status Grebo families, women perform the primary agricultural labor, including planting, weeding, harvesting, and processing crops. While women often serve as the primary economic providers through the cultivation and sale of rice and cash crops, they maintain subordinate social positions within the domestic hierarchy, contributing their earnings to collective household wealth.

In higher-status Grebo families, social roles often follow a traditional division of labor where men serve as primary breadwinners and women focus on domestic responsibilities and childcare. In these contexts, social status is frequently associated with women's involvement in domestic management rather than external economic production.

Grebo culture employs a dual-sex political system in which men and women occupy separate but complementary positions of authority. This system provides for independent political functions, including the election of separate male and female town chiefs who share no family ties. While this structure offers women significant political autonomy and distinct avenues for leadership, access to these positions is often contingent upon socioeconomic factors; for example, women without property holdings face greater barriers to entering higher social strata than their male counterparts.

== Notable women ==
- Ellen Johnson Sirleaf, the 24th President of Liberia
- Angie Elizabeth Brooks, the only African woman to become president of the UN General Assembly
- Jewel Cianeh Howard Taylor, Liberian politician
- Comfort M. Freeman, Liberian peace activist
- Leymah Gbowee, Liberian peace activist

== See also ==
- Polygamy in Liberia
- Women in Africa

Documentaries:

- Pray the Devil Back to Hell

General:

- Human rights in Liberia
