= International Labor Rights Forum v Firestone Tire and Rubber Co =

International Labor Rights Forum v Firestone Tire and Rubber Co (2005) was a class–action lawsuit filed by The International Labor Rights Forum on November 17, 2005, against the Firestone Tire and Rubber Company, on behalf of a group of former child laborers, in Liberia.

The plaintiffs accused the company of knowingly allowing the use of child laborers filing a suit as a result of policies which began when Firestone opened its first plant in Liberia in 1926.

Firestone contends the 1926 agreement as a milestone advancement in the global production of rubber.

== See also ==
- Economy of Liberia
- Liberia (on 1926 rubber agreement)
- Firestone Tire and Rubber Company#Firestone's corporate troubles
