= LGBTQ rights in Liberia =

- Liberia
- Legal status: Illegal since 1978
- Penalty: Up to 1 year's imprisonment or maximum of LBR$1,000 fine (repeal proposed)
- Military: No
- Discrimination protections: Yes, employment protections on the basis of sexual orientation and gender identity since 2015

Family rights
- Recognition of relationships: No
- Adoption: No

Lesbian, gay, bisexual, transgender, and queer (LGBTQ) people in Liberia face legal and social challenges which others in the country do not experience. LGBTQ people in Liberia encounter widespread discrimination, including harassment, death threats, and at times physical attacks. Several prominent Liberian politicians and organizations have campaigned to restrict LGBTQ rights further, while several local, Liberian-based organizations exist to advocate and provide services for the LGBTQ community in Liberia. Same-sex sexual activity is criminalized regardless of the gender of those involved, with a maximum penalty of three years in prison, and same-sex marriage is illegal.

== Legal status ==
Same-sex sexual activity is criminalized in Liberia. Sections 14.74 and 14.79 of Liberia's penal code defines consensual same-sex sexual activity as "voluntary sodomy," a first-degree misdemeanor punishable by up to one year in prison or a fine of up to L$1000, or both. The law applies to all individuals engaging in oral or anal sexual activity who "are not husband and wife or living together as man and wife though not legally married." As a result, same-sex sexual activity in Liberia is criminalized, regardless of the gender of the people participating in it. Under section 50.8 subsection 1. "First degree misdemeanor. A defendant convicted of a misdemeanor of the first degree may be sentenced as for a felony of the third degree if the court is satisfied that there is an exceptional need for rehabilitative or incapacitative measures for the protection of the public in view of the fact that this is the third conviction against the defendant within five years for misdemeanors of the first degree or more serious crimes." Section 50.5 subsection c. says "For a felony of the third degree, to a definite term of imprisonment to be fixed by the court, the maximum of which shall be three years."

Enforcement and prosecution of this law is uncommon. However, the fact that the law exists can deter LGBTQ victims of crimes from reporting them to police, as some LGBTQ people have been arrested on the basis of their sexuality or gender identity after their attackers used the fact they were part of the LGBTQ community as an excuse for their crimes.

Gender-affirming hormone therapy and gender-affirmation surgery are not available in Liberia. Same-sex marriage is not recognized in Liberia.

=== Legislation considered in 2012 ===
In late 2011, British Prime Minister David Cameron announced that the United Kingdom would suspend foreign aid to countries which persecuted LGBTQ people. In December of that year, United States Secretary of State Hillary Clinton delivered a speech urging nations around the world to respect LGBTQ rights, the same day an Obama administration memo was released directing all US government agencies to do what they could to promote LGBTQ rights abroad, including by taking LGBTQ rights into account when making decisions about foreign aid or migrants' asylum status. Several Liberian news outlets reported that the United States planned to stop granting foreign aid to countries which did not sufficiently respect LGBTQ rights or, in particular, countries which did not recognize same-sex marriage. This triggered a backlash against LGBTQ rights and LGBTQ people in Liberia, including multiple pieces of anti-LGBTQ legislation and an increase in violent attacks against LGBTQ people.

In 2012, two anti-LGBTQ bills were introduced in the Liberian Legislature. A bill introduced by Representative Clarence Massaquoi proposed increasing the penalty for same-sex sexual activity, from a first-degree misdemeanor carrying a maximum sentence of one year in prison to a second-degree felony with a maximum prison sentence of five years. A separate bill introduced by then-Senator Jewel Howard Taylor would have categorized same-sex marriage as a first-degree felony, with a maximum ten-year prison sentence. In response, President Ellen Johnson Sirleaf threatened to veto either bill, while also defending the existing laws criminalizing same-sex sexual activity as a misdemeanor, ascribing existing laws to "traditional values in our society that we'd like to preserve." Massaquoi's bill to increase the penalties for same-sex sexual activity failed to pass either the House or Senate, while Taylor's bill to criminalize same-sex marriage was passed by the Senate but not the House. As a result, neither bill was enacted into law.

== Discrimination protections ==
Section 2.4 (b)(iii) of Liberia’s Decent Work Act (2015) entitles all who seek to work in Liberia to do so regardless of sex, gender identity or sexual orientation.

== Political support ==
=== Support ===
Stop AIDS in Liberia (SAIL) was the first NGO founded by LGBTQ people in Liberia for the service of fellow LGBTQ people in Liberia. It was originally founded to educate men who have sex with men about HIV/AIDS, to test them for HIV/AIDS, and to provide counseling for those who tested positive for HIV/AIDS. Since 2012, it has expanded its programming to include a wider range of services and has expanded its mission to include all LGBTQ people in Liberia. SAIL has led trainings for the Liberian National Police on the importance of LGBTQ rights, and they have advocated in the media on the behalf of LGBTQ people. Other groups, such as the Transgender Network of Liberia (TNOL), which was founded by a transgender Liberian woman in 2014, have emerged from the SAIL umbrella to further cater to specific communities and needs as independent organizations.

In January 2012, University of Liberia student Archie Ponpon founded an organization called the Movement for the Defense of Gay and Lesbian Rights in Liberia (MODEGAL), which advocated for the legalization of same-sex marriage in Liberia. Activists affiliated with MODEGAL attempted to organize on the campus of the University of Liberia, but they were physically attacked, threatened with death, and forced to flee. Ponpon was not openly a member of the LGBTQ community, and he did not consult with existing LGBTQ advocacy organizations or activists in Liberia to coordinate strategy, sparking some LGBTQ rights activists in the country to question whether Ponpon was motivated by a genuine interest in LGBTQ rights in Liberia or an attempt to use the platform of LGBTQ rights to gain wealth or attention for himself. The organization mostly had the effect of provoking outrage and backlash among opponents of LGBTQ rights in Liberia during the 2012 anti-LGBTQ panic, and it has not been active since.

=== Opposition ===
Several prominent Liberian politicians have attempted to garner support by opposing LGBTQ rights. President Charles Taylor attempted to vilify LGBTQ Liberians in order to unify the country under his leadership, and to lend himself a sense of attention to moral issues, after winning the presidency of Liberia in the aftermath of the First Liberian Civil War. When defending his proposal to recategorize same-sex sexual activity as a felony, Clarence Massaquoi claimed, "Homosexuality is not part of our existence as a people." In response to MODEGAL activism in support of LGBTQ rights in 2012, House Speaker Alex Tyler vowed that he would never support a bill protecting LGBTQ rights, and that any such bill "will be thrown in the 'Du or Montserrado River." In September 2016, when announcing his candidacy for president, Prince Johnson vowed that he would "never, ever accept gay rights." Jewel Howard Taylor, who proposed the 2012 bill that would have criminalized same-sex marriage, was elected vice president in 2017.

The New Citizens Movement is an anti-LGBTQ coalition of Christian and Muslim leaders, which was founded in 2012. The organization gained particular prominence when it gathered 100 000 signatures for a petition to Ellen Johnson Sirleaf supporting the existing ban and criminalization of same-sex sexual activity. Many members of the New Citizens Movement have claimed, despite evidence to the contrary, that the LGBTQ community are a recent, Western- or colonial-invented phenomenon, and arguments that the LGBTQ identities are "not African" are common among opponents of LGBTQ rights, both within and outside the organization.

The New Citizens Movement has employed religious messages in its opposition to LGBTQ rights, but it has emphasized issues specific to postwar Liberia. Since-debunked reports emerged in the Liberian press in 2012 alleging that a nonexistent California-based organization had bribed lawmakers to legalize same-sex marriage. Although the story was later proven to be false, it associated LGBTQ rights with the issues of corruption and foreign influence. Similarly, New Citizens Movement activists have made unsubstantiated allegations that young people in Liberia have been denied jobs after refusing to have sex with prospective employers of the same sex, tying LGBTQ rights to unemployment issues. The New Citizens Movement has also argued that recognizing LGBTQ rights would fissure the nation in a way that could lead to another civil war in the country.

== Living conditions ==
A 2020 United Nations report found "serious, widespread," and persistent violations of LGBTQ Liberians' human rights. LGBTQ people in Liberia have faced employment and housing discrimination, physical attacks and death threats. LGBTQ Liberians often have to hide their identities in public, though some private spaces exist for LGBTQ people to be their authentic selves, often sponsored by LGBTQ advocacy organizations such as Stop AIDS in Liberia and the Transgender Network of Liberia, or created by private individuals.

=== Attacks on LGBTQ people ===
In 1990, during the First Liberian Civil War, famed singer Tecumsay Roberts was murdered by high-ranking members of the Independent National Patriotic Front of Liberia (INPFL) after he was accused of being gay. He was killed shortly after INPFL leader Prince Johnson supposedly "verified" that he had engaged in same-sex sexual activity. Johnson has been accused of murdering Roberts, though Johnson has accused INPFL deputy Samuel Varnii of being the one to actually kill Roberts.

In 2012, Movement Against Gays in Liberia (MOGAL) distributed fliers which published the names of people in Monrovia they claimed were gay and threatened their lives.

In November 2016, after the conclusion of an event in Monrovia introducing candidates for the Transgender Network of Liberia's 2017 Miss Trans Diva pageant, residents of the neighborhood in which the event took place attacked those who remained at the event and threatened to kill anyone present. More than two dozen people were trapped in a structure for hours before police managed to defuse the situation.

=== Health ===
According to a 2013 UN-AIDS survey, the prevalence rate of HIV/AIDS among Liberian men who have sex with men (MSM) is 19.8%. In addition to advocacy on behalf of LGBTQ people in Liberia, Stop Aids in Liberia has been active in reducing the rates of HIV/AIDS in the MSM population.

== Summary table ==
Same-sex sexual activity legal	No (Penalty: 1 year imprisonment or fine)
Equal age of consent	No
Anti-discrimination laws in employment only	Yes (Since 2015)
Anti-discrimination laws in the provision of goods and services	No
Anti-discrimination laws in all other areas (Incl. indirect discrimination, hate speech)	No
Same-sex marriages	No
Recognition of same-sex couples	No
Stepchild adoption by same-sex couples	No
Joint adoption by same-sex couples	No
LGBTQ people allowed to serve openly in the military	No
Right to change legal gender	No
Access to IVF for lesbians	No
Conversion therapy made illegal	No
Commercial surrogacy for gay male couples	No
MSMs allowed to donate blood	No

== See also ==
- Human rights in Liberia
- LGBTQ rights in Africa
- LGBTQ rights by country or territory
