= Liberia Cement Corporation =

Liberian cement manufacturer

Liberia Cement Corporation (Cemenco)
- Industry: Cement manufacture
- Products: Cement
- Website: www.cemenco.com/en

The Liberia Cement Corporation, also known as Cemenco, is a major company in the economy of the Republic of Liberia. One of the oldest firms operating in the country in the early twenty-first century, it holds a monopoly on the sale of cement in the country. The firm's original factory was opened by Mr. Fouad R Khalifa a Lebanese businessman and by President William V.S. Tubman in early January 1968. In the early 2010s, another firm announced its goal of entering the Liberian market, but by late 2012, no other companies were yet in the market. In response to this challenge, corporate officials announced in November 2012 their plans to erect a new manufacturing plant. Its previously existing facility is located on Bushrod Island in Monrovia, as is the site of the plant announced in November 2012; at that time, company bosses were planning to use a site formerly occupied by a manufacturing component of the defunct Mesurado Group of Companies. Historically, Cemenco had warehouses at the Freeport of Monrovia, but an ownership dispute over the warehouse property resulted in its conveyance to a Chinese firm in late 2012.

In the mid-2000s, Cemenco was partially privately owned; its shares were divided among international firm Scancem, which owned 62% of the company; the Liberian government, with 29%; and other stockholders, who owned 9% of the company. Its monopoly status derives from a government decision in 1977, before the military coup that overthrew the country's government; at least one prominent Liberian has alleged that the monopoly status was a mechanism to enable political corruption by government officials who personally owned shares in the company.

Liberia Cement has been the focus of environmental health complaints from those who live in nearby Monrovia neighborhoods, such as New Georgia and the Jamaica Road corridor. Residents have alleged that government officials have provided them no aid in fighting the company, which they say causes numerous childhood diseases because of the wide dissemination of the dust that its grinding process produces. In light of this difficulty, early plans for the plant announced in 2012 included the addition of pollution control equipment approved by the country's pollution control agency, and at the same time, observers noted reduced dust emissions from the existing plant. The firm's goals include achieving the ability to produce multiple types of cement, rather than continuing to import the product from other countries.
