= United Methodist University =

University in Monrovia, Liberia

- School seal
- Type: Private
- Established: 1998; 28 years ago
- Affiliations: United Methodist Church of Liberia
- Students: 9,118 (2016)
- Location: Monrovia, Liberia; 6.31764°N 10.8053°W
- Website: umu.edu.lr

The United Methodist University (UMU) is a private institution of higher learning located in Monrovia in the West African nation of Liberia. Established in 1998 and opened in 2000, the school had 9,118 students as of 2016. UMU is certified by the Liberian government's National Commission on Higher Education to grant both bachelor's and master's degrees.

== History ==
The United Methodist University in Liberia began to explore starting a university in the 1970s which led to adding a junior college business program at the College of West Africa in 1980. The church then studied expanding the school into a full university with an exploratory committee formed in 1986. The church planned to move forward in 1990, but the First Liberian Civil War delayed the creation of the school, which the goal was re-affirmed in 1997. On 9 October 1998, the Liberian Legislature chartered United Methodist University, with the school, then opening in January 2000 under the leadership of Rev. Dr. Emmanuel F. Bailey.

In April 2011, the school and Starz Institute of Technology began a partnership in which Starz would operate the university's information technology program. The next March, UMU discontinued the program after the country's National Commission on Higher Education informed UMU it would have to end the partnership due to Starz not being an authorized degree granting school. The university announced plans to start a radio station in December 2012 at a cost of US$25,000 (~$33,662 in 2024) in order to provide practical training to students in the Mass Communication Department.

== Academics ==
Academic programs at UMU include Six colleges: College of Science and Technology, College of Liberal and Fine Arts, College of Theology, College of Health Sciences, College of Management and Administration, and the Joseph Jenkins Roberts College of Education. UMU has partnerships with US-based colleges, including Salem State University and Illinois Central College.

== See also ==
- List of universities in Liberia
