= Polygamy in Liberia =

Societal aspect of Liberia

While polygamous unions are unlawful under the Liberian civil code, such marriages are perfectly permissible under the Liberia's customary law.

== Dynamics ==
According to reports, polygamous marriages make up about one-third of all Liberian marriages. One third of married women in the age group 15-49, are in polygamous marriages.

Customary law allows men to have up to 4 wives. Customary law restricts a married woman's rights to inherit property from her spouse. When widowed, women are at the mercy of the customary laws that are not subject to the civil courts.

== See also ==
- Gender inequality in Liberia
