= Agriculture in Liberia =

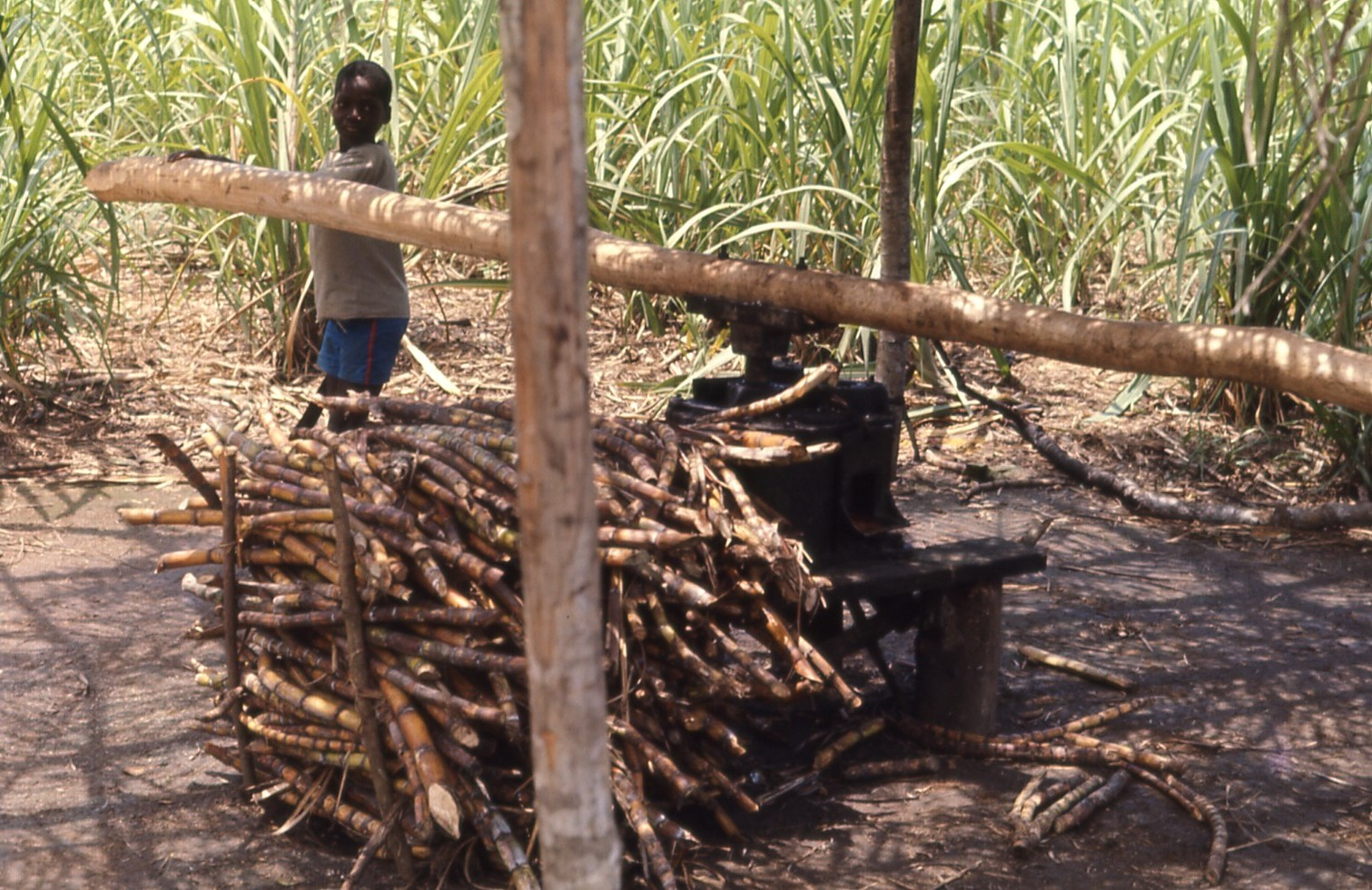
Young boy grinding sugar cane near Flumpa, Nimba County, 1968

Agriculture in Liberia is a major sector of the country's economy worth 38.8% of GDP, employing more than 70% of the population and providing a valuable export for one of the world's least developed countries (as defined by the UN). Liberia has a climate favourable to farming, vast forests, and an abundance of water, yet low yields mean that over half of foodstuffs are imported, with net agricultural trade at -$73.12 million in 2010. This was dismissed as a "misconception" by Liberia's Minister of Agriculture.

The major crops are natural rubber, rice, cassava, bananas and palm oil. Timber is also a major export at $100 million annually, although much of this is the product of unsustainable habitat destruction, with Asian corporations criticised for their role. Although agricultural activity occurs in most rural locations, it is particularly concentrated in coastal plains (subsistence crops) and tropical forest (cash crops). The sector is very important for women as they are widely employed in it in comparison to the economy as a whole.

== History ==
Deys, Bassa, Kru, and the West Atlantic Gola and Kissi, are likely to be the first inhabitants of the region of present-day Liberia. Their migration was caused by the decline of the Malian Empire in 1375 and Songhay in 1591. Favourable arable land in comparison to their homelands also brought them in the area. Alongside their social and cultural customs, these immigrants also took with them rice, tuber and cotton cultivation. Evidence for this comes from early European merchants, such as Pedro de Cintra, who arrived in 1461.

When the first American slaves were repatriated to Liberia in 1822, they met hostile tribes. The people and their farming was little-changed from centuries previously. However, settlers developed commercial agriculture, growing most of the crops the country now grows today. The industry was still noted as inefficient and primitive in the 1850s, but had considerable potential for trade in produce: "If the land was cleared, it would be excellent land for corn, eddoes, cassada, cane, and rice". However, in the 1870s the agricultural sector witnessed a prolonged crisis due to falling prices of cocoa and sugar as well as coffee being introduced to Brazil. In the first half of the 20th century, the nation received loans from the United States, who created it, developing its economy and agriculture. In World War II, due to south east Asia's rubber's control by Japan, the United States invested heavily in Liberia, especially in agricultural infrastructure.

In the 1990s the government was criticised for selling rights for deforestation to foreign companies, who exploited the bio-diverse hardwood rainforest. This resulted in many reforestation programmes, although woodland is still destroyed for other uses, such as iron ore mining. Indeed, 98% of the population rely on firewood for fuel, and trees are still cut down for export to Europe and to grow plants. Liberia also lost 70% of its rare mangrove forest at the coast by the mid-1980s. Only a quarter of the original evergreen rainforest is left and almost all the remainder of the land is a mosaic of crops, shrubs and planted trees, in contrast to the Great Plains of its founding country.

Much of the industry was devastated by two civil wars ('89-'96 and '99-'03), with rice production falling by 76% between 1987 and 2005. However, the fighting completely destroyed almost all other sectors of the economy, causing agriculture's share of GDP to rise from 40% in 1990 to 95% in 1996. Chronic malnutrition was (and still is) widespread, caused by a lack of infrastructure, poverty due to unemployment and low use of fertilisers and pesticides (below 1%).

Nevertheless, recent investment from foreign companies has resulted in cash crop production rising since 2006 with the percentage of households producing them doubling from 28% in 2006 to 46% in 2009 and 55% in 2012. The main cash crops are rubber, coffee, and cocoa. This followed a successful election in 2005, which allowed a democratic government to rebuild infrastructure.

== Land ==
Half of Liberia's total landmass is forest (4.9 million hectares) and 47% is arable land, although most of this is upland pasture. The 'slash and burn' technique is used extensively to convert woodland into rice paddies, often at the expense of biodiversity. The nation consists of flat, coastal plains and dwarf mountains further inland in the north east.

=== Soil ===
Three quarters of the country's land is made up of latosol, a reddish, mineral-rich but infertile soil found in tropical rainforest. While suitable for timber production, without leaf litter it quickly loses its fertility. This, in deforested area, combined with a lack of chemicals, causes Liberia's low yields.

=== Climate ===
A tropical climate gives high temperatures all-year round (roughly 27 °C), relative humidity of 65-80%, and heavy rainfall, especially in coastal regions with 3,500-4,600 mm. The rainy season lasts from May to October and leaves the region in water surplus for 5–8 months.

== Livestock ==
The livestock sector accounts for 14% of GDP despite large areas of pasture after being devastated by the civil war. Almost all animals were eaten. This is also combined with a lack of rural credit and an unfavourable climate. For example, cattle population (per 1000) plummeted from 42 in 1985 to 36 a decade later. Grand Gedeh, Lofa, Bong, and Nimba counties harbour the majority of the cattle, sheep and goats. The most prevalent breeds of cattle are N’Dama and Muturu, although there have been limited attempts to cross breed these with larger cattle. The most common breed of ruminant in the West African Dwarf and there are also other types of goat. Over 80% of ruminants are kept in traditional village animal husbandry systems. The government constructed ranches and encouraged commercial cattle production but have all been since deserted.

There is no dairy industry in Liberia and all milk is imported. Many of the problems with farming are also blamed on rural-urban migration: as the young move from the countryside to Monrovia and other cities, there is a shortage of labour for farming.

The Food and Agriculture Organization identified the following problems in 2002:

- Lack of improved breeding stock.
- Lack of feed.
- Diseases and unavailability of veterinary services.
- Lack of adequate training of available livestock officers.
- Lack of processing facilities.
- Inadequate transportation and roads, and
- Inadequate policy.
- less payment to workers
- low power or heavy machine

== Crops ==
=== Rice ===
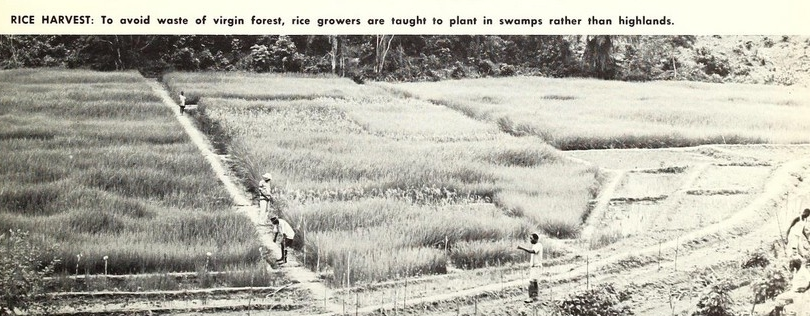
Harvesting Rice in Liberia in 1965

Alongside cassava, rice is the staple food of the republic, with 238,000 tonnes produced in 2013. The foodstuff accounts for 22% of agricultural GDP, far higher than all livestock. However, the harvest still falls short of 1988 levels which were 299,000 tonnes even though the population has doubled. Yields are also low with most rice at 3 tonnes per hectare, less than half the average in the United States.

In 1979, rice riots resulted in the destruction of $40 million worth of private property. Forty people were killed and 500 wounded. In the wake of the Ebola virus epidemic in West Africa, rice production has shifted away from the traditional 'breadbasket' Lofa, Nimba and Bong Counties to the south east following irrigation investment which tripled yields. The epidemic has also caused large price rises and overgrown rice fields, causing the government to declare a state of emergency.

=== Timber ===
Liberia has over 230 species of tree and 14 million acres of forest. Its tropical hardwoods are valuable, chiefly in luxury furniture abroad. The largest firm in the sector is the Indonesian-owned Oriental Timber Corporation, with about three million acres and it has invested over $100 million in sawmills.

=== Rubber ===
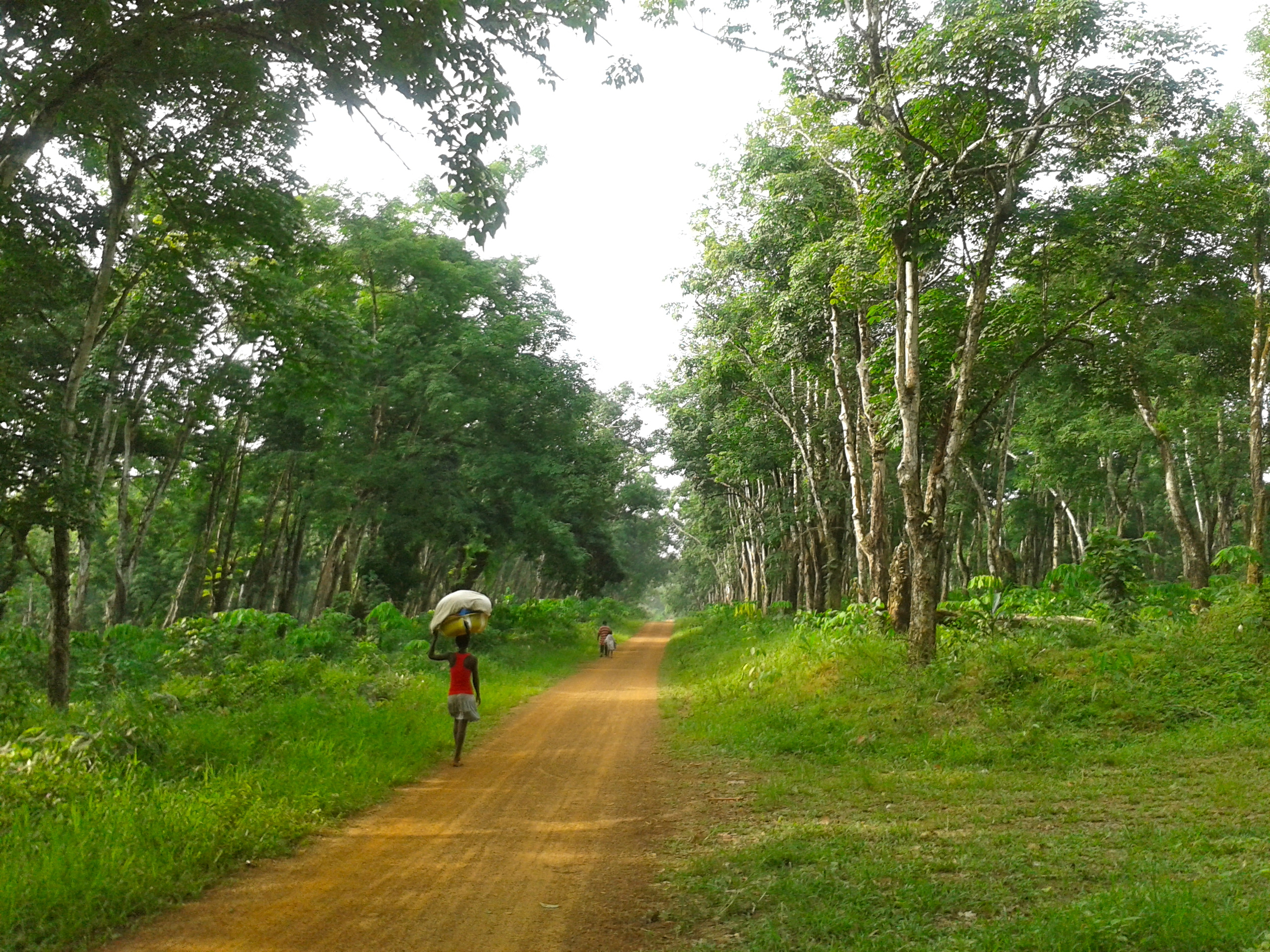
Rubber Tree Plantation in Margibi County, Liberia

The rubber industry was born in the country when Hilary R. W. Johnson, the president, permitted a British firm to extract wild latex in 1890. Liberia Rubber Corporation, another British corporation, built a plantation at Mount Barclay two decades later, but both failed in their endeavours.

During World War I, Britain and the Netherlands controlled 98% of the raw materials necessary for the production of rubber. In 1922, the Rubber Restriction Act was passed in Britain, increasing the cost of rubber. Then, in 1926, Mr. Harvey S. Firestone (a tyre company owner) obtained a 99-year lease for 4% of the country's territory in exchange for a $5 million loan. This ensured the nation's rapid growth in the world natural rubber market in World War II. The 12,000 Liberian employees were paid low wages, because the Liberian government felt that "men with money in their pockets would eventually have demanded the ballot". Firestone gave Charles Taylor, the warlord who caused the deaths of 300,000 Liberians, millions of dollars to secure the future of the firm's plantations, but production was still stopped for 6 years from 1990.

Despite making up 11% of its exports, there are estimated to be 600,000 ha. of overgrown rubber plantations, some 60 years old. Ergo, there is a large export potential in the redundant rubber-wood. The rubber industry is also diversifying, using trees which no longer produce latex as biomass.

=== Cassava ===
The shrub makes up 23% of Liberian agricultural GDP and is now the second most important food crop. It can be grown throughout the country, although the area covered may vary considerably for different counties. The Liberian Ministry of Agriculture stated that the total area covered by the crop in 1977 was 86,000 ha with an average yield of 1800 kg/ha, and that 26 percent of all agricultural households in the country grew the crop. Its cultivation increased rapidly in the early 1980s. In 1985 283,000 tonnes of cassava was made, 23% larger than the previous year. The same increase happened with the area harvested (113 100 ha) and yield per ha (2500 kg).

Most Liberian cassava is processed into various forms for human consumption. Cassava is normally left in the ground until it is ready to be sold, eaten, or processed into a more durable form. The leaves are also often eaten as a vegetable and the FAO encourages their use as animal feed.

Cassava can be ground into farina flour by removing the skin and grinding it in hammer mills or by hand in a traditional mortar. This is after it has been dried, most typically in the sun. Farina is produced throughout the country, especially in Bassa, Bomi and Nimba counties.

=== Coconut palm ===
The coconut palm is a versatile element of every local village. Its branches facilitate house building and thatched roofs. The leaves are used in baskets, nets and crude clothes. The fruit itself is high in energy as fat, and can make cooking oil, candles, soap, palm wine and dried flakes. The ash from burnt shells is also another constituent of the soap-making process. Fences, brooms and spoons can also be made from this crop.

== International aid ==
Since 1977 the Food and Agriculture Organization has given aid to the country. It has encouraged diversification of farms with projects such as horticulture and snail-farming as well as improved yields after Chinese investment. Almost all investment in the country is dependent on foreign donations as the economy was all but destroyed after decades of conflict.

== Ministry of Agriculture ==
The Ministry of Agriculture (MOA) is the government ministry responsible for the governance, management and promotion of agriculture, founded on May 11, 1972. The Ministry is responsible for the oversight of agronomy, animal husbandry and other agriculture industries, the economic organization of the agriculture and food industries, and national food security. The work of the Ministry is divided into sectors of Livestock Production, Agricultural Chemicals and Crop Production.

The current Minister of Agriculture is Mogana S. Flomo Jr., Ph.D. Main Ministry offices are located in Monrovia.
