= Liberian Women's Social and Political Movement =

The Liberian Women's Social and Political Movement was a Liberian women's organization founded by Sarah Simpson-George in 1946.

== History ==
Sarah Simpson-George was a Liberian educator. She was the sister of Clarence Lorenzo Simpson, William Tubman's (19th President of Liberia) first vice president, and the wife of Samuel D. George, MP for Montserrado County. Encouraged by visiting the United States for a NCNW Wartime Workshop in 1944, she published 'An Open Letter to the Women of Liberia' in Monrovia's Weekly Mirror newspaper on her return, and founded the Liberian Women's Social and Political Movement in 1946. The Movement announced its purpose as follows:

The Liberian Women’s Social and Political Movement is a National organization which embraces all women of Liberia. The organization is a social and political movement because it aims, by a connected series of efforts and actions, to achieve certain ends pertaining to society and the mutual relation of individuals as also those relating to civil government and its administration.

The Liberian Women's Social and Political Movement took part in that year's NCNW annual convention, sending Mary McCritty Fiske as official delegate. In the years that followed it pressed for women to be allowed to serve on juries, which was achieved in 1949, and to be elected to public office, which was achieved in a 1951 constitutional amendment.

Papers relating to the Liberian Women's Social and Political Movement survive among the William V. S. Tubman papers and have been digitized.
