= List of universities in Liberia =

This is a list of universities in Liberia. As of 2018, Liberia had a total of 38 government recognized universities and colleges that confer baccalaureate degrees or higher. In addition, as of 2010, there were 14 community colleges that were recognized by the National Commission on Higher Education.

Unaccredited universities operating illegally in Liberia have been occasionally shut down by the government. This list only includes accredited schools.

== Recognized universities ==
=== Public ===
Liberia has three public universities.

- Tubman University, Cape Palmas, Maryland County, formerly William V.S. Tubman College of Technology (2500 students).
- University of Liberia, Monrovia, Montserrado County (17,620 students as of 2009)
- Nimba University, formerly called Nimba County Community College (2,000 students as of 2022)
- Grand Gedeh Community College

=== Private ===
The Liberian education authority distinguishes between private and faith-based universities.

- Adventist University of West Africa, Marshall, Margibi County
- African Methodist Episcopal University, Montserrado County (3,432 students as of 2009)
- African Methodist Episcopal Zion University, Montserrado County (2,325 students as of 2009)
- Cuttington University, Suacoco, Bong County, oldest private and coeducation university in Africa (2,287 students as of 2009)
- Stella Maris Polytechnic University, Monrovia, Montserrado County (2,090 students as of 2009)
- United Methodist University, Monrovia, Montserrado County (3,118 students as of 2009)
- Wesleyan College
- A.M.E. Zion University, Monrovia
- African Bible College University, Yekepa, Nimba County (65 students as of 2009)
- Baptist College of Missionary Physician Assistants
- Barshell University, Paynesville, Montserrado County
- BlueCrest University College Liberia, Sinkor Road, Montserrado Country
- Bushrod College of Science & Technology
- Carver Christian University (CCU), [Formerly, Monrovia Bible College (MBC)], Paynesville, Montserrado,
- CENSIL College, Paynesville, Liberia, Montserrado County
- CEPRES International University (CIU) Monrovia
- Free Pentecostal College (FPC)
- Hill City University of Science & Technology
- Liberia Assemblies of God Bible College (LAGBC)
- Liberia Baptist Theological Seminary
- Liberia International Christian College, Ganta, Nimba County
- LICOSESS College of Education (Monrovia with Satellite campuses in 7 counties). Largest Teacher Training College in Liberia (2500 teacher aspirants as of 2025) www.licosess.org
- Notre Dame University College of Liberia
- Rafiki College of Classical Education, Boys' Town, Margibi County
- Smythe Institute of Management and Technology, Monrovia, Montserrado County
- Starz University, Monrovia, Montserrado County
- Sumo Moye Memorial Technical College, (SMMTC) Liberia
- The Salvation Army Polytechnic(T-SAP)
- Trinity University, Liberia

== Others ==
- Booker Washington Institute, Kakata
