= Coat of arms of Liberia =

- Armiger: Republic of Liberia
- Adopted: 26 April 1847
- Motto: The Love of Liberty Brought Us Here

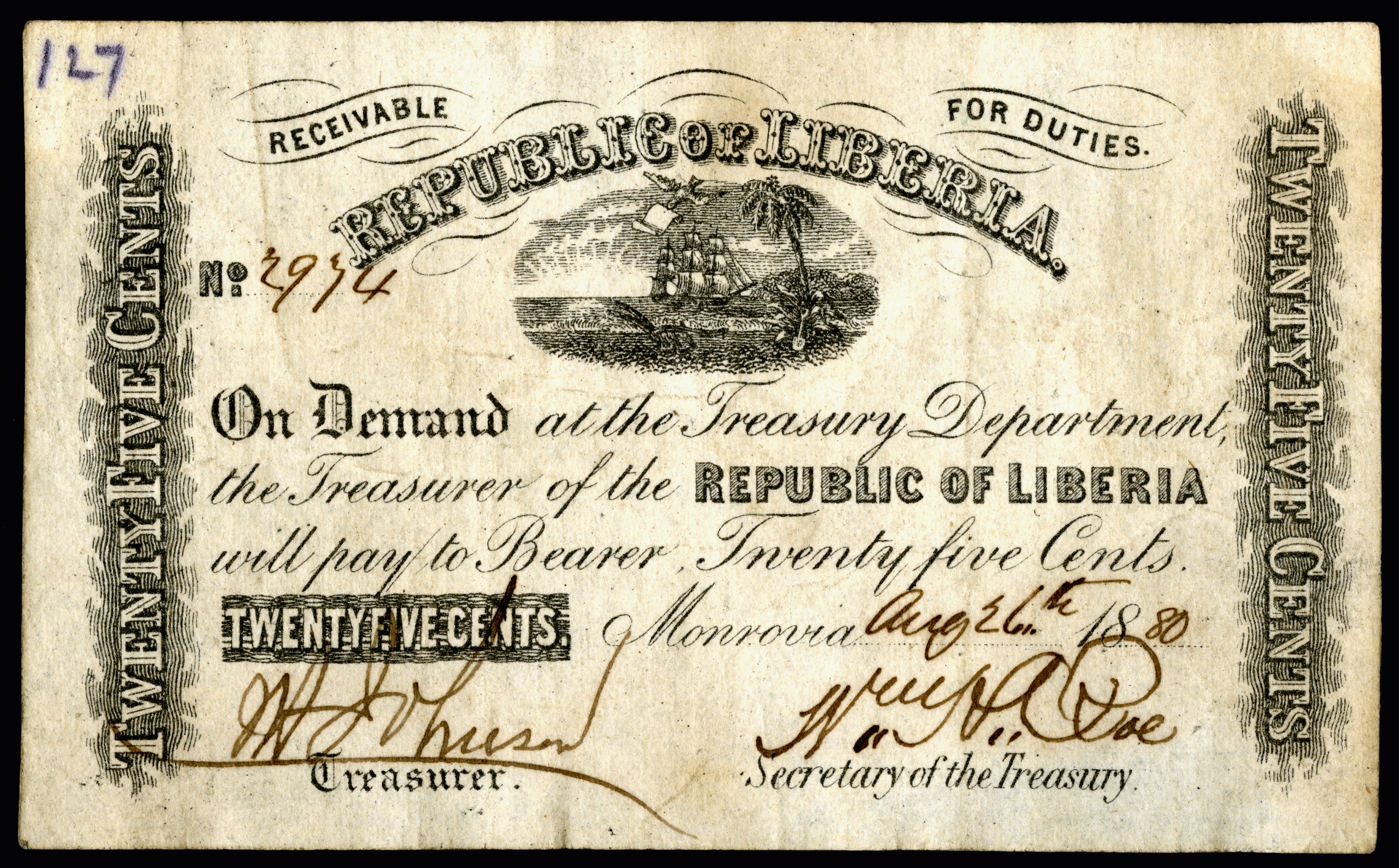
The national coat of arms as depicted on Liberian currency in 1880.

The coat of arms of Liberia consists of a shield containing a picture of a 19th-century ship arriving in Liberia. The ship represents the ships that brought free people of color and formerly enslaved people from the United States to Liberia. Above the shield, the national motto of Liberia appears on a scroll: The Love of Liberty Brought Us Here, and below the shield another scroll contains the official name of the country, Republic of Liberia.

The plow and the shovel represent the dignity of labor and hard work through which the nation will prosper. The rising sun in the background represents the birth of a nation.

The palm tree, the nation's most versatile source of food, represents prosperity.

The white dove with a scroll represents the breath of peace.

== History ==
On 22 July 1974, the Legislature of Liberia passed an act giving authorization to the president to establish a commission to give consideration to possible changes to a number of national symbols, including the national seal and motto. President William Tolbert appointed 51 members to the Commission on National Unity. The commission was headed by McKinley Alfred Deshield Sr., and was also called the Deshield Commission. The commission sought to reexamine the symbols, and remove divisive or uninclusive aspects of them. The commission submitted their report on 24 January 1978. The report recommended changing the motto from "The Love of Liberty Brought Us Here" to "Love, Liberty, Justice, Equality". The proposed change to the motto was never made.

=== Older versions ===
Seal of American Colonization Society

circa 1847-1889

1847–1889

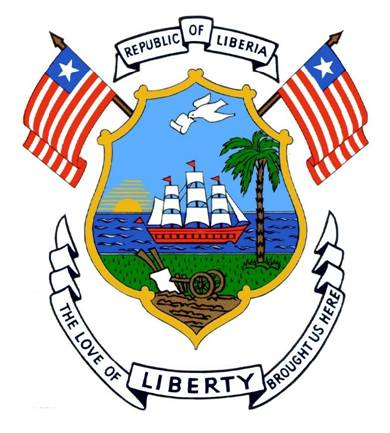
1889–1921

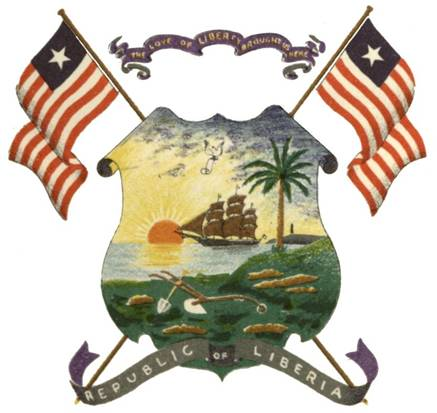
1921–1974

== Description ==
The coat of arms of Liberia has no heraldic blazon. According to David Kazanjian's article The Speculative Freedom of Colonial Liberia, the national device of Liberia was adopted at the 1847 constitutional convention. The article quotes the following description as the design guidelines:

Seal: A dove on the wind with an open scroll in its claws. A view of the ocean with a ship under sail. The sun just emerging from the waters. A palm tree, and in its base a plough and spade. Beneath the emblems, the words REPUBLIC OF LIBERIA and above the emblems, the national motto: "THE LOVE OF LIBERTY BROUGHT US HERE".
