= Economy of Liberia =

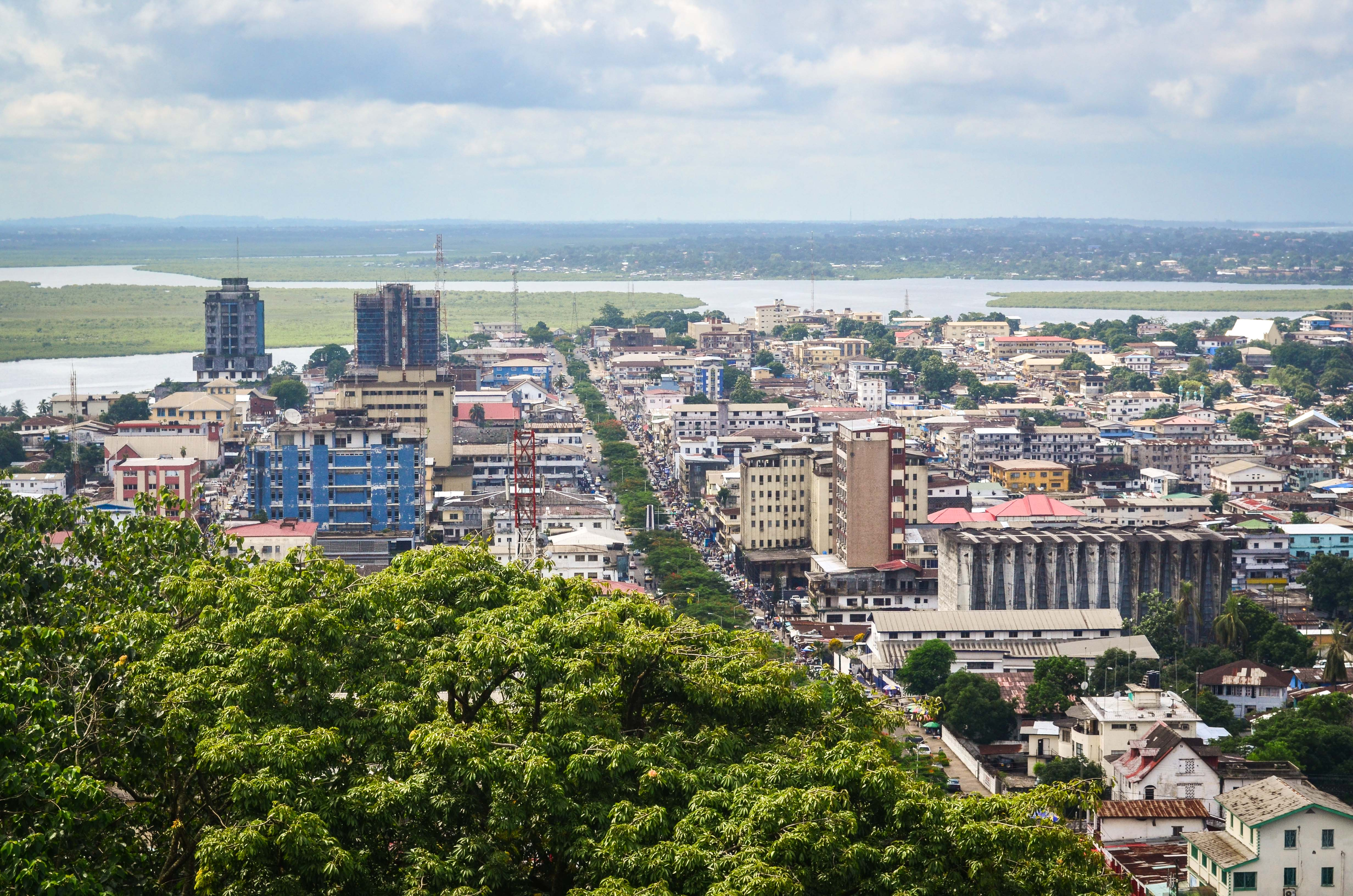
- Currency: Liberian dollar (LRD); United States dollar (USD)
- Trade organizations: AU, AfCFTA (signed), African Development Bank, ECOWAS, MRU, WAMZ, WTO, Group of 77
- Country group: Least Developed; Low-income economy

Statistics
- Population: ▲5,073,296 (2020 est.)
- GDP: ▲$5.17 billion (nominal; 2025); ▲$11.42 billion (PPP; 2025)
- GDP rank: 161st (nominal; 2025); 162nd (PPP; 2025)
- GDP growth: ▲4.6% (2023); ▲4.8% (2024); ▲5.3% (2025); ▲5.5% (2026f)
- GDP per capita: ▲$907 (nominal; 2025); ▲$2,010 (PPP; 2025)
- GDP per capita rank: 175th (nominal; 2025); 178th (PPP; 2025)
- GDP by sector: agriculture: 34%; industry 13.8%; services 52.2%; (2017 est.)
- Inflation (CPI): 20.5% (2020 est.)
- Population below national poverty line: 54.1% (2014 est.); 40.9% on less than $1.90/day (2016)
- Gini coefficient: 35.3 medium (2016)
- Human Development Index: ▼0.465 low (2018) (176th); 0.314 low IHDI (2018)
- Labor force: ▲1,639,258 (2019); ▲74.6% employment rate (2016)
- Labor force by occupation: agriculture: 70%; industry: 8%; services: 22%; (2000 est.)
- Unemployment: 2.8% (2014 est.)
- Main industries: mining (iron ore and gold), rubber processing, palm oil processing, diamonds

External
- Exports: ▲$260.6 million (2017 est.)
- Export goods: rubber, timber, iron, diamonds, cocoa, coffee
- Main export partners: Germany 36.2%; Switzerland 14.2%; United Arab Emirates 8.8%; United States 6.8%; Indonesia 4.7%; (2017)
- Imports: ▼$1.166 billion (2017 est.)
- Import goods: fuels, chemicals, machinery, transportation equipment, manufactured goods; foodstuffs
- Main import partners: Singapore 29.8%; China 24.4%; South Korea 17.5%; Japan 9.4%; (2017)
- Current account: ▼ −$627 million (2017 est.)
- Gross external debt: ▲$1.036 billion (31 December 2017 est.)

Public finance
- Government debt: ▲34.4% of GDP (2017 est.)
- Foreign reserves: ▼$459.8 million (31 December 2017 est.)
- Budget balance: −4.3% (of GDP) (2017 est.)
- Revenue: 553.6 million (2017 est.)
- Spending: 693.8 million (2017 est.)
- Economic aid: recipient: International multi-billion dollar debt relief and development aid
- All values, unless otherwise stated, are in US dollars.

The economy of Liberia is extremely underdeveloped, with only $3.222 billion by gross domestic product as of 2019, largely due to the First (1989–1996) and Second Liberian Civil War (1999–2003). Liberia itself is one of the poorest and least developed countries in the world, according to the United Nations.

Until 1979, Liberia's economy was among the more developed and fastest-growing in Sub-Saharan Africa, but after the 1980 coup d'état, it declined, and the civil war destroyed much of Liberia's economy and infrastructure, especially the infrastructure in and around the nation's capital, Monrovia. The war also caused a brain drain and the loss of capital, as the civil war involved overthrowing the Americo-Liberian minority that ruled the country. Some have returned since 1997, but many have not.

Liberia is richly endowed with water, mineral resources, forests, and a climate favorable to agriculture, but poor in human capital, infrastructure, and stability. Liberia has a fairly typical profile for Sub-Saharan African economies. The majority of the population is reliant on subsistence agriculture, while exports are dominated by raw commodities such as rubber and iron ore. Local manufacturing, such as it exists, is mainly foreign-owned.

The democratically elected government, installed in August 1997, inherited massive international debts and currently relies on revenues from its maritime registry to provide the bulk of its foreign exchange earnings. The restoration of the infrastructure and the raising of incomes in this ravaged economy depend on the implementation of sound macro- and microeconomic policies of the new government, including the encouragement of foreign investment.

== Economic history ==
Much of independent Liberia's economic history is subject to limited archival documentation, making it hard for economic historians to make comprehensive assessments about the nature of Liberia's economy over time. The Liberian government only began producing GDP per capita data in 1964.

A 2022 study by LSE economic historian Leigh A. Gardner assessed that Liberian GDP per capita was $430 in 1845, which was just above subsistence and approximately half of Japan's GDP per capita at the time. It rose to approximately $500 by the time of independence, but the economy subsequently stagnated until the 1930s when a period of rapid economic growth began. Whereas Liberia had been poorer than Ghana during the 19th and early 20th centuries, it caught up with Ghana in 1950 and subsequently diverged considerably, becoming almost twice as wealthy as Ghana by 1970. Throughout the 1970s, the Liberian economy stagnated.

In 1926, the Liberian government gave the Firestone Tire company the right to lease up to 1 million acres of land for 99 years at a cost of 6 cents per acre. Firestone developed an inordinate sway over the Liberian government, effectively acquiring control over its finances in the subsequent period. The company was an important source of foreign investment into Liberia during this period. Firestone then set about establishing rubber tree plantations of the non-native South American rubber tree, Hevea brasiliensis in the country. By the 1950s, the company was Liberia's largest private employer and also its largest exporter. Vincent Browne wrote in 1955 that rubber accounted for more than $45,000,000 of Liberia's approximately $55,000,000 worth of exports. Liberia became one of the largest rubber exporters in the world in the post-World War II period. Today, Firestone's rubber plantation in Liberia is the world's largest contiguous rubber plantation, operated by the Firestone (now Bridgestone) subsidiary, the Firestone Natural Rubber Company.

In the 1940s, Liberia become one of the largest recipients of American aid. US aid to Liberia began with the Lend-Lease program of 1942. The aid per capita received by Liberia was comparable to that obtained by countries such as Korea and Marshall Aid recipients like the United Kingdom. Economic historian George Dalton estimated in 1965 that Liberia received more aid per capita from the United States than any other African country.

In the post-WWII period, Liberia tried to become a destination for offshore services, as the country loosened laws related to ship registration, corporation, and taxes. The Liberian shipping registry was highly successful as Liberia had by the 1960s become the largest ship registry in the world in terms of tonnage.

The Liberian economy had relied heavily on the mining of iron ore prior to the civil war. Liberia was a major exporter of iron ore on the world market. By the 1970s, iron mining accounted for more than half of Liberia's export earnings. Since the coup d'état of 1980, the country's economic growth rate has slowed down because of a decline in the demand for iron ore on the world market and political upheavals in Liberia.

Upon the end of the war in 2003, GDP growth began to accelerate again, reaching a peak of 9.4% in 2007. In 2009, during the Great Recession GDP growth slowed to 4.6%, though a strengthening agricultural sector led by rubber and timber exports increased growth to 5.1% in 2010 and an expected 7.3% in 2011, making the economy one of the 20 fastest growing in the world.

In March 2010, Bob Johnson, founder of BET, funded the first hotel constructed in Liberia in 20 years. The 13-acre (53,000 m^{2}) luxury resort was built in the Paynesville section of Monrovia.

Liberia's external debt was estimated in 2006 at approximately $4.5 billion, 800% of GDP. As a result of bilateral, multilateral and commercial debt relief from 2007 to 2010, the country's external debt fell to $222.9 million by 2011.

== Economic sectors ==
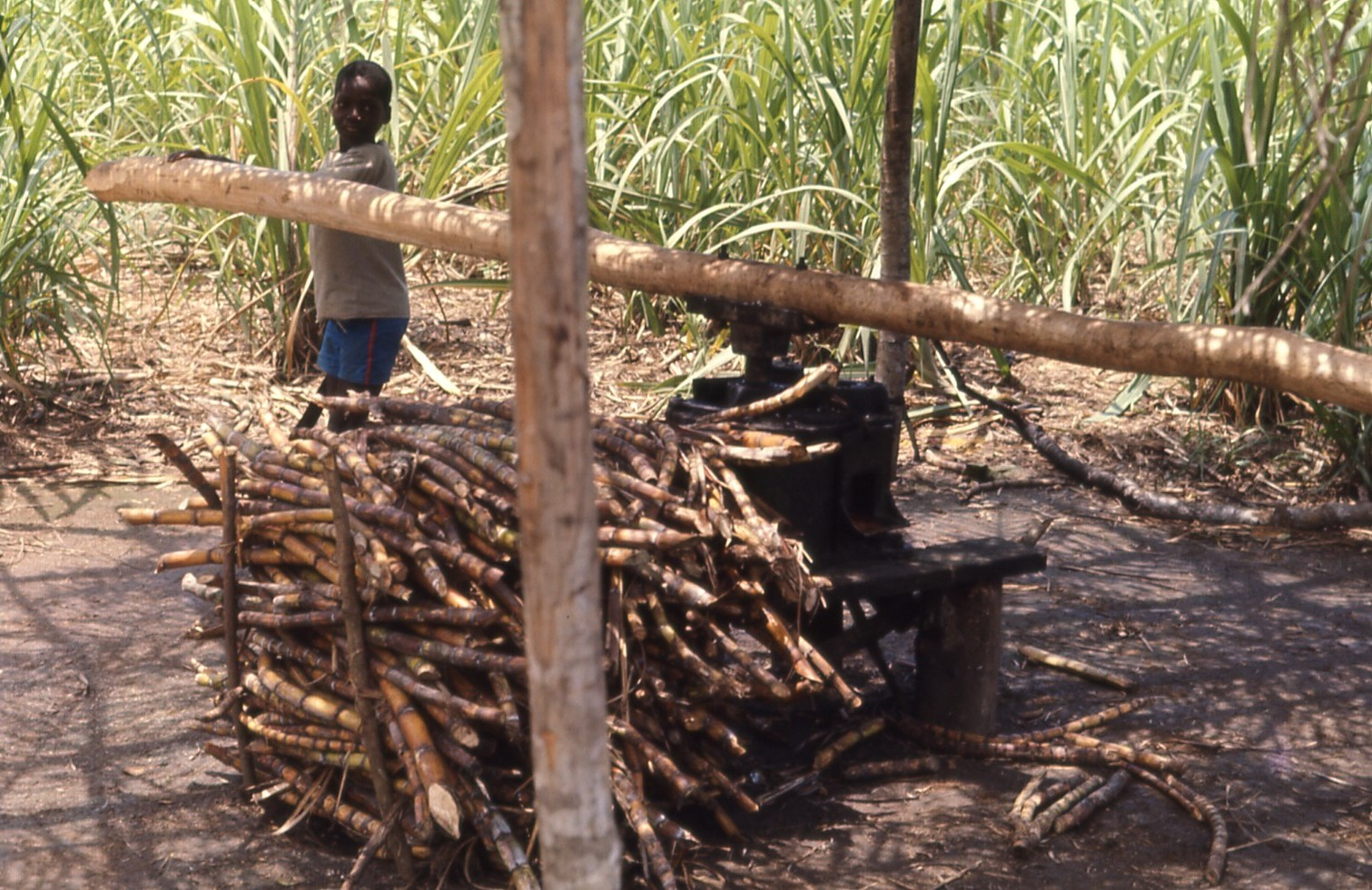
Boy grinding sugar cane 1968

Liberia's business sector is largely controlled by foreigners mainly of Levantine (primarily Lebanese) and Indian descent. There also are limited numbers of Chinese people engaged in agriculture. The largest timber concession, Oriental Timber Corporation (OTC), is Indonesian owned. There also are significant numbers of West Africais engaged in cross-border trade. Legal monopolies are possible; for example, Cemenco holds a monopoly on cement production.

=== Agriculture ===
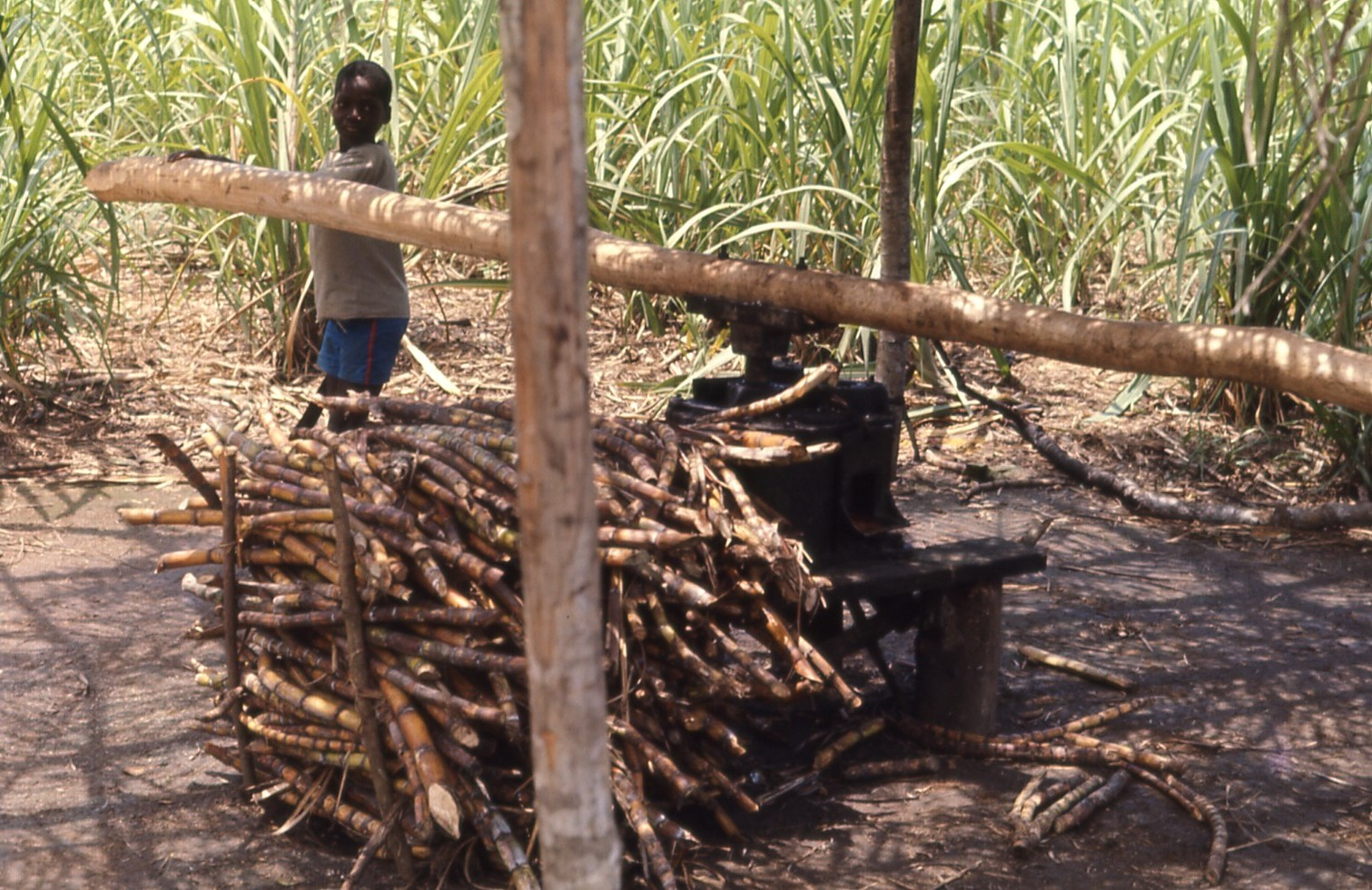
Young boy grinding sugar cane near Flumpa, Nimba County, 1968

Agriculture in Liberia is a major sector of the country's economy worth 38.8% of GDP, employing more than 70% of the population and providing a valuable export for one of the world's least developed countries (as defined by the UN). Liberia has a climate favourable to farming, vast forests, and an abundance of water, yet low yields mean that over half of foodstuffs are imported, with net agricultural trade at -$73.12 million in 2010. This was dismissed as a "misconception" by Liberia's Minister of Agriculture.

The major crops are natural rubber, rice, cassava, bananas and palm oil. Timber is also a major export at $100 million annually, although much of this is the product of unsustainable habitat destruction, with Asian corporations criticised for their role. Although agricultural activity occurs in most rural locations, it is particularly concentrated in coastal plains (subsistence crops) and tropical forest (cash crops). The sector is very important for women as they are widely employed in it in comparison to the economy as a whole.

=== Forestry ===
Timber and rubber are Liberia's main export items since the end of the war. Liberia earns more than $100 million and more than $70 million annually from timber and rubber exports, respectively.

=== Mining and resources ===
Alluvial diamond and gold mining activities also account for some economic activity. In recent years (2005 - 2012), foreign investment from ArcelorMittal, BHP and China Union is aiding the revitalization of the iron-ore mining sector.

Liberia has begun exploration for offshore oil; unproven oil reserves may be in excess of one billion barrels. The government divided its offshore waters into 17 blocks and began auctioning off exploration licenses for the blocks in 2004, with further auctions in 2007 and 2009. An additional 13 ultra-deep offshore blocks were demarcated in 2011 and planned for auction. Among the companies to have won licenses are Repsol YPF, Chevron Corporation and Woodside Energy.

=== Shipping flag of convenience ===
Liberia maintains an open maritime registry, meaning that owners of ships can register their vessels as Liberian with relatively few restrictions. This has meant that Liberian ship registration is usually understood as the employment of a flag of convenience. Liberia has the second-largest maritime registry in the world behind Panama, with 4,300 vessels registered under its flag accounting for 12% of ships worldwide. This includes 35% of the world's tanker fleet. Liberia earned more than $18 million from its maritime program in 2000.

=== Tourism ===
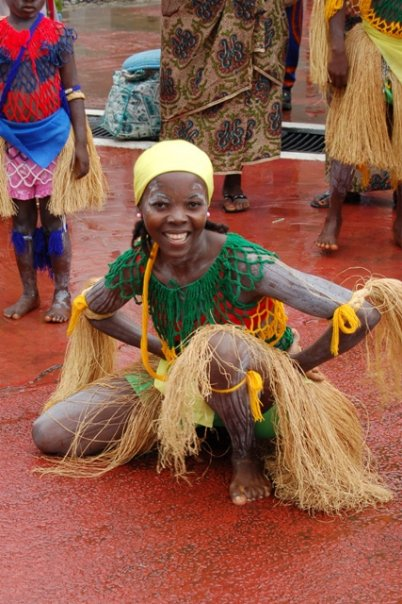
Liberian dancer.

Tourism forms a small part of the national economy of Liberia. In the past, many tourists visited Liberia, mostly from the United States. Liberia's economy, including the tourist industry, was badly damaged by 1989-2003 civil war in the country, and has only just started picking up with the launching of a Tourism Association in the country. Accommodation is now available to tourists, as is Liberia's transport infrastructure. One bright spot is surfing off Robertsport.

=== Foreign aid ===
Liberia has relied heavily on vast amounts of foreign assistance, particularly from the United States, Sweden, Britain, France, Italy, Germany, the People's Republic of China, and Romania. But because of the Liberian Government's perceived disregard for human rights, foreign assistance to Liberia has declined drastically.

The Republic of China (Taiwan) and Libya are currently the largest donors of direct financial aid to the Liberian Government. Significant amounts of aid continue to come in from Western countries through international aid agencies and non-governmental organizations, avoiding direct aid to the government.

=== Communications ===
Communications in Liberia is the press, radio, television, fixed and mobile telephones, and the Internet. There are six major newspapers in Liberia, and 45% of the population has a mobile phone service. Also, the radio stations in Liberia are abundant to the extent that there are over 70 radio stations in the entire country (Liberia). As for Montserrado County, there exist about 30 radio stations.

Even as it struggles with economic and political constraints, Liberia's media environment is expanding. The number of registered newspapers and radio stations (many of them community stations) is on the rise despite limited market potential. And politically critical content and investigative pieces do get published or broadcast.

=== Energy ===
Exports of Liberia by product category (2019) Chemical products Transportation Machines Mineral products Plastics and rubbers Metals Foodstuffs Precious metals Textiles Instruments Animal products Vegetable products Paper goods Footwear and headwear Miscellaneous Stone and glass Wood products Animal and vegetable bi-products Animal hides Arts and antiques Weapons

Formal electricity services are solely provided by the state-owned Liberia Electricity Corporation, which operates a small grid almost exclusively in the Greater Monrovia District. The vast majority of electric energy services is provided by small privately owned generators. At $0.54 per kWh, the electricity tariff in Liberia is among the highest in the world. Total installed capacity in 2013 was 20 MW, a sharp decline from a peak of 191 MW in 1989.

== International economic networks ==
Liberia is a member of the Economic Community of West African States (ECOWAS). With Guinea and Sierra Leone, it formed the Mano River Union (MRU) for development and the promotion of regional economic integration. The MRU became all but defunct because of the Liberian civil war which spilled over into neighboring Sierra Leone and Guinea.

== Data ==
The following table shows the main economic indicators in 2000–2036, including historical data and estimates through 2025 and IMF projections for 2026. Inflation below 5% is in green.

Year	GDP (in billion US$ PPP)	GDP per capita (in US$ PPP)	GDP (in billion US$ nominal)	GDP growth (real)	Inflation rate (in Percent)	Government debt (in % of GDP)
2000	3.7	1,282	0.9	n/a	▲5.3%	468.1%
2001	▲3.8	▲1,299	▲0.9	▲2.8%	▲12.1%	▼465.2%
2002	▲4.1	▲1,345	▲0.9	▲4.4%	▲14.2%	▼463.6%
2003	▼2.9	▼958	▼0.7	▼−29.0%	▲10.3%	▲600.1%
2004	▲3.1	▲1,003	▲0.9	▲4.0%	▲3.6%	▼543.4%
2005	▲3.4	▲1,068	▲0.9	▲5.9%	▲6.9%	▼488.5%
2006	▲3.8	▲1,154	▲1.1	▲8.5%	▲9.5%	▼450.9%
2007	▲4.5	▲1,289	▲1.3	▲13.1%	▲11.4%	▼366.8%
2008	▲4.8	▲1,338	▲1.7	▲6.1%	▲17.5%	▼235.3%
2009	▲5.1	▲1,361	▲1.8	▲5.2%	▲7.4%	▼132.2%
2010	▲5.5	▲1,413	▲2.0	▲6.4%	▲7.3%	▼25.4%
2011	▲6.0	▲1,505	▲2.3	▲7.7%	▲8.5%	▼22.5%
2012	▲6.7	▲1,614	▲2.7	▲8.4%	▲6.8%	▼20.5%
2013	▲7.4	▲1,739	▲3.0	▲8.8%	▲7.6%	▲20.6%
2014	▲7.6	▼1,736	▲3.1	▲0.7%	▲9.9%	▲24.3%
2015	▲7.6	▼1,709	▲3.1	0.0%	▲7.7%	▲24.4%
2016	▼7.6	▼1,654	▲3.3	▼−1.6%	▲8.8%	▲28.0%
2017	▲7.9	▲1,683	▲3.3	▲2.5%	▲12.4%	▲31.8%
2018	▲8.5	▲1,763	▼3.3	▲1.2%	▲23.5%	▲36.2%
2019	▲8.9	▲1,801	▼3.1	▼−2.5%	▲27.0%	▲48.1%
2020	▼8.2	▼1,586	▼3.0	▼−3.0%	▲17.0%	▲58.5%
2021	▼8.1	▼1,537	▲3.5	▲5.0%	▲7.8%	▼53.5%
2022	▲9.1	▲1,689	▲4.0	▲4.8%	▲7.6%	▲54.4%
2023	▲9.8	▲1,792	▲4.4	▲4.6%	▲10.1%	▲57.2%
2024	▲10.5	▲1,869	▲4.8	▲4.0%	▲8.2%	▼56.4%
2025	▲11.3	▲1,979	▲5.2	▲5.1%	▲8.3%	▼54.9%
2026	▲12.3	▲2,095	▲5.6	▲5.1%	▲5.7%	▼53.8%

== See also ==
- Central Bank of Liberia
- Transport in Liberia
- Tourism in Liberia
- Firestone Natural Rubber Company
- United Nations Economic Commission for Africa
