= Human rights in Liberia =

Human rights in Liberia became a focus of international attention when the country's president, Ellen Johnson Sirleaf, was named one of the three female co-winners of the 2011 Nobel Peace Prize, all of whom were cited "for their non-violent struggle for the safety of women and for women's rights to full participation in peace-building work".

Yet, as the Guardian noted in October 2012, "the award to President Sirleaf was not unanimously welcomed in her own country", and a year after the prize was announced, one of Sirleaf's co-winners, Liberian activist Leymah Gbowee, articulated the views of many of Sirleaf's critics, charging the president with nepotism, among other offenses, and citing the high government positions held by Sirleaf's three sons. In November 2012, a Liberian human-rights lawyer, Tiawan Saye Gongloe, also criticized Sirleaf's nepotism and called on her to resign.

Both nepotism and corruption are widespread in Liberia. Among the country's other very serious human-rights problems are ritualistic killings, police abuse, incidents of so-called "trial by ordeal", arbitrary arrest, the denial of due process, violence against women, domestic violence, female genital mutilation, child abuse, human trafficking, and child labor. Since the end of the Civil War in 2003, however, there has been a great deal of activity by a number of international organizations with the objective of establishing in Liberia a solid democracy based on human rights.

Liberia is a signatory of the International Covenant on Civil and Political Rights, the International Covenant on Economic, Social and Cultural Rights, the International Convention on the Elimination of All Forms of Racial Discrimination, the Convention on the Elimination of All Forms of Discrimination against Women, the Convention against Torture and Other Cruel, Inhuman or Degrading Treatment or Punishment, and the Convention on the Rights of the Child.

== Civil War aftermath ==
The 2003 peace agreement that ended the Civil War called for the establishment by the Liberian government of an Independent National Human Rights Commission. Although an act officially founding such a commission was passed in 2008, the actual formation of the commission was delayed for several years. Amnesty International noted in 2013 that Liberia was in dire need of such a commission, and called on the government to "make the establishment of such a commission a top priority".

In September 2009 the Independent National Commission on Human Rights was finally created, yet the selection of its members, according to Human Rights Watch, was marred by "a flawed vetting procedure, inadequate involvement of civil society groups, and the initial selection of a member with close ties to the president, and of other members who lacked relevant experience", all of which raised doubts about the commission's independence and about Sirleaf's commitment to it.

Human Rights Watch noted that in 2010 Liberia "made no progress in ensuring the prosecution of those responsible for war crimes committed during the armed conflicts" in accordance with the 2009 final report of the Truth and Reconciliation Commission. A 2012 report by Amnesty International complained that persons guilty of major human-rights violations during the civil war had still not been brought to justice, and the Truth and Reconciliation Commission's call for the establishment of a criminal tribunal to prosecute such cases had still not been heeded.

Five human rights organizations formed the Coalition for Justice in Liberia (CJL) in October 2012 "to advocate for justice, create awareness, and campaign for the establishment of an international tribunal to prosecute perpetrators of war crimes in Liberia". It also seeks, among other things, to help "build and strengthen national democratic institutions and the rule of law in Liberia which will include monitoring, documenting and advocating their effective functioning as people-centered institutions of justice that uphold the rule of law and respect for human rights". The CJL said that its first order of business would be "to name and shame" the perpetrators of wartime human-rights violators "and make sure that the USA is neither a safe haven for them nor a vacation joint where they travel and enjoy their bloody wealth without any form of accountability".

Since Liberia's civil war ended in 2002, UN forces have been in charge of security and have been training Liberian armed forces and police. A US-led program to recruit and train a new Liberian army finished its task in December 2009, although American military personnel continued to train Liberian military officers throughout 2010. Security forces, although reporting to civilian officials, sometimes act on their own.

== Basic rights ==
As a rule, the government respects citizens' freedom of speech and of the press, although the government has sued newspapers and others for libel. Journalists often publish articles in return for payment. Internet access is unrestricted, although fewer than 1 percent of Liberians are online. Academic institutions operate freely. The right to free assembly is usually respected, though there are exceptions. Liberians enjoy religious freedom. They also enjoy the freedom to travel domestically and abroad, and the right to move abroad and repatriate, but when traveling are sometimes subject to arbitrary searches and extortion by police and immigration officers.

Discrimination based on ethnicity, sex, religion, disability, and other such traits is illegal, but often takes place nonetheless. Racial discrimination is legal, however. Only blacks, for example, may become Liberian citizens or landowners.

Liberians living outside of Monrovia have highly limited access to government services.

Ritualistic killings, which involve the removal from the victim's corpse of body parts used in tribal rituals, and which are often described in police reports as accidents or suicides, are a common occurrence. Protests against these killings are also common, and sometimes lead to injury and death

== Corruption ==
Corruption is endemic at every level of the Liberian government. Corruption is not, as such, a punishable crime under Liberian law.

There exists an underfunded and understaffed Liberian Anti-Corruption Commission, created in 2008, that is supposedly empowered to prosecute crimes that effectively amount to corruption. Human Rights Watch noted in 2011 that though there had been a multiplicity of high-level corruption scandals during the previous year, they had resulted in "few investigations and only two convictions". The Anti-Corruption Commission, HRW complained, is "hampered by insufficient funds [and] personnel" and does not actually have the "authority to independently prosecute cases", and that the failure of Sirleaf to deal with this issue has led to "the perception that the president lacks the will to address the problem".

== Women's rights ==
Women have the same legal status as men. Rape and domestic violence are illegal, but widespread, and the laws against them are not effectively enforced. Rape and other forms of sexual violence remain among the most frequently committed crimes. Spousal rape is not criminalized.

Recent improvements on this front include the establishment of a court for gender and sexual violence cases the opening of a UN-supported safe house in Monrovia for survivors of sexual violence, the UN's funding of a national action plan on gender-based violence, and the ratification by Liberia of the Protocol to the African Charter on Human and Peoples' Rights on the Rights of Women in Africa. Human Rights Watch noted that in 2010, reporting of rape and the police response to those reports improved, but despise the establishment of the sexual-violence court "deficiencies in the justice system and the reluctance of witnesses to testify hampered efforts to prosecute cases".

Sexual harassment is not illegal, and is also common. Polygamy is also illegal, but many men have several wives, in accordance with local traditions. The Ministry of Gender and Development is charged with protecting women's rights.

The UN Committee on the Elimination of Discrimination against Women, in a 2009 report, called on Liberia "to enact without delay and as a matter of priority legislation prohibiting female genital mutilation and to ensure that offenders are prosecuted and punished in accordance with the severity of this violation". It also called on Liberia "to immediately stop issuing permits to practitioners, as is currently being done by the Ministry of Internal Affairs", and to implement and strengthen programs designed to change attitudes toward the practice. The committee also urged Liberia "to address all forms of violence against women", to make use of every possible means "to convey the message that all forms of violence against women, including domestic violence, are unacceptable", and to ensure that such violence is properly addressed by the judicial system.

Trafficking of women is a problem, and the UN Committee on the Elimination of Discrimination against Women has called on Liberia to effectively implement and enforce the 2005 Anti-Human Trafficking Act, to provide support to women victims, and to address root causes of the problem.

== Children's rights ==
In Liberia, a child becomes a citizen if at least one parent is Liberian or if the child is black and born in the country. Non-black children born in Liberia are not entitled to citizenship, a policy that raises significant concerns about their rights and protections. Although education is technically free, families are responsible for providing uniforms, books, and supplies. Many schools also require additional "fees" to cover operational costs and salaries, which can be a barrier for low-income families.

Child abuse, including sexual abuse, is prevalent, and practices such as female genital mutilation (FGM) remain common and legal. Prostitution of young girls is also a significant issue, alongside child trafficking, compounded by the presence of many street children in urban areas such as Monrovia. According to recent estimates, there are thousands of street children in Liberia, many of whom are orphans or come from unstable family situations. These children often lack access to basic necessities, including food, shelter, and education.

Orphanages in Liberia operate with little regulation, leading to inadequate food supplies, poor sanitary conditions, and limited medical care. Many orphanages depend on external support from organisations such as UNICEF for financial aid. As of 2023, it is estimated that there are over 30,000 orphans in Liberia, a situation exacerbated by the aftermath of civil wars and health crises, namely, the Ebola outbreak.

In terms of international agreements, Liberia is not a signatory of the 1980 Hague Convention on the Civil Aspects of International Child Abduction, which raises concerns regarding the protection of children's rights in cases of international custody disputes.

The Norwegian Human Rights Fund "supports several local initiatives to defend the rights of children and to promote human rights in Liberia's school system", including programs to prevent the sexual exploitation and abuse of students in schools. It has helped in the establishment of "peer watch clubs" and "redress committees" that report such abuses and that have led to the dismissal of a number of teachers. A member of one of these school clubs said that its activity "has contributed to increased respect for student's rights at the school. For instance, the habit of untimely relationships between teachers and students has been greatly reduced since the club was established two years ago." Efforts supported in part by the NHRF have also contributed to the eradication of physical punishment in schools.

As part of a 2010 project by the Self Help Development & Relief Agency that sought to improve the human-rights situation for secondary-school students in southeastern Liberia, "more than 3000 students and teachers participated in training sessions on human rights issues". Students debated human-rights and formed committees "to identify and highlight violations and find tools to hold perpetrators to account". The program was successful in many ways, helping to eliminate such longstanding practices as "children working on the farms of teachers and purchasing palm oil as school fees" and parents being obliged to pay tuition for nominally free schools. "Progress was also made in the area of abuse and violence against students. In most schools targeted, a ban on beating students for wrongdoings or failure has been enforced. In one case, flogging of students was banned as a result of the SHDRA intervention."

UNESCO, through the United Nations Peacebuilding Fund, collaborated with the Liberian Ministry for Education to implement the "Peace, Human Rights and Citizenship Education" program in the country's schools. This involved training 1,300 teachers to equip "students with knowledge and conflict resolution skills in order to promote peaceful co-existence".

Ultimately, while there are initiatives underway to improve the situation for orphans and vulnerable children in Liberia, significant challenges remain. Addressing these issues requires a coordinated effort from government, NGOs, and the international community to ensure that all children, especially orphans, can access their rights to education, safety, and support.

== Rights of the disabled ==
Discrimination against disabled people is illegal but widespread, especially in the countryside. Most public buildings are inaccessible to disabled people, and there is no law requiring them to be accessible. As a result of the civil war, there are many Liberians with disabilities. There is a National Commission on Disabilities but it is not effective at protecting disabled people's rights.

== Minority rights ==
Liberia has 16 different indigenous ethnic groups, each with its own language, and mutual intolerance among them persists. Persons of non-black heritage are not permitted to own property in Liberia and are not eligible to apply for citizenship.

== LGBT rights ==
Same sex activities are illegal in Liberia. There are no known LGBT rights organizations. When Sirleaf won the Nobel Peace Prize and was widely lauded as a human-rights heroine, this discrepancy was noted by many, but Sirleaf stood her ground against gay rights.

A joint interview in March 2012 with Tony Blair made international headlines because of Sirleaf's support of her country's antigay legislation and because of Blair's refusal to challenge her on the subject. "We've got certain traditional values in our society that we would like to preserve," Sirleaf said.

== Trade union and labour rights ==
Workers in the private sector have the right to join unions and are allowed to strike and to engage in collective bargaining. Workers in the public sector are forbidden from joining trade unions.

Forced labor is illegal, but takes place, with rural families often sending women and children to cities to work in homes or as street vendors. Children under 16 are not allowed to work, but this prohibition is not effectively enforced and child labor is virtually ubiquitous, with minors working in urban markets, on farms and plantations, and in other jobs, some of them dangerous.

The Child Labor Commission is supposed to protect children from working, but is insufficiently staffed and funded. Various laws limit working hours, establish benefit requirements, and set health and safety standards. There is a minimum wage but it does not apply to many workers.

A project in Liberia by the Action for Community and Human Development has sought to "enhance industrial workers unions' capacity to engage with management and protect workers' rights, build the capacity of local community development structures in governance and decision making, and assist constituents with their engagement with local authorities".

== Legal and penal system ==
=== Rights of persons on trial ===
The Liberian judiciary is characterized by inefficiency, corruption, underqualified lawyers and judges, and a chronic lack of court facilities, transportation, and other resources. Although defendants have the right to attend their own trials, to consult an attorney, to view evidence, and to appeal convictions, these rights are often denied to persons who do not pay bribes or have a lawyer.

Amnesty International described the problems with the Liberian judiciary as follows in 2012: "Inadequate police investigations, a shortage of public defenders, poor case management, corruption, and a judiciary that lacked the capacity to hear cases in a timely manner contributed to a backlog in the criminal justice system. Around 80 per cent of prisoners were awaiting trial; some were detained for years before their trial....People were often required to pay for services that are supposed to be free, for example for police to carry out investigations. Magistrates routinely denied bail. The judiciary lacked independence." Judges will often award damages, try cases, release prisoners, and issue not-guilty verdicts in return for bribes, and defendants are often advised by their lawyers to pay off judges, jurors, and others.

=== Rights of persons in prison ===
Prison conditions in Liberia are substandard, with overcrowding, insufficient food and potable water, poor sanitation and ventilation, and a lack of medical care. The Red Cross has been helping to improve the water supply and sanitation at several facilities, while the UN and various NGOs have been providing medical services and working on sanitary issues. In some cases, men and women, adults and children, and convicts and defendants awaiting trial are incarcerated together. Inmates are allowed to receive visitors and practice their religions.

The government permits monitoring of prison conditions by the UN, human-rights groups, and the media. In 2008 the overwhelming majority of inmates in Monrovia Central Prison, according to Amnesty International, were being "held without charge, some for as long as two years". In 2010, according to Human Rights Watch, "just over 10 percent of the roughly 1,700 individuals detained in Liberia's prisons had been convicted of a crime".

Sirleaf signed an act in 2008 that reintroduced the death penalty. The United Nations Human Rights Committee noted with concern that this represented a violation of the Second Optional Protocol to the International Covenant on Civil and Political Rights, of which Liberia is a signatory.

== Historical situation ==
The following chart shows Liberia's ratings since 1972 in the Freedom in the World reports, published annually by Freedom House. A rating of 1 is "free"; 7, "not free".^{1}

Historical ratings

| Year | Political Rights | Civil Liberties | Status | Head of State^{2} |
| 1972 | 6 | 6 | Not Free | William R. Tolbert, Jr. |
| 1973 | 6 | 5 | Not Free | William R. Tolbert, Jr. |
| 1974 | 6 | 3 | Partly Free | William R. Tolbert, Jr. |
| 1975 | 6 | 4 | Partly Free | William R. Tolbert, Jr. |
| 1976 | 6 | 4 | Partly Free | William R. Tolbert, Jr. |
| 1977 | 6 | 4 | Partly Free | William R. Tolbert, Jr. |
| 1978 | 6 | 5 | Partly Free | William R. Tolbert, Jr. |
| 1979 | 6 | 5 | Partly Free | William R. Tolbert, Jr. |
| 1980 | 7 | 6 | Not Free | William R. Tolbert, Jr. |
| 1981 | 6 | 6 | Not Free | Samuel Doe |
| 1982^{3} | 6 | 6 | Not Free | Samuel Doe |
| 1983 | 5 | 5 | Partly Free | Samuel Doe |
| 1984 | 6 | 5 | Partly Free | Samuel Doe |
| 1985 | 5 | 5 | Partly Free | Samuel Doe |
| 1986 | 5 | 5 | Partly Free | Samuel Doe |
| 1987 | 5 | 5 | Partly Free | Samuel Doe |
| 1988 | 5 | 5 | Partly Free | Samuel Doe |
| 1989 | 6 | 5 | Not Free | Samuel Doe |
| 1990 | 7 | 7 | Not Free | Samuel Doe |
| 1991 | 7 | 6 | Not Free | Amos Sawyer |
| 1992 | 7 | 6 | Not Free | Amos Sawyer |
| 1993 | 6 | 6 | Not Free | Amos Sawyer |
| 1994 | 7 | 6 | Not Free | Amos Sawyer |
| 1995 | 7 | 6 | Not Free | David D. Kpormakpor |
| 1996 | 7 | 6 | Not Free | Wilton G. S. Sankawulo |
| 1997 | 4 | 5 | Partly Free | Ruth Perry |
| 1998 | 4 | 5 | Partly Free | Charles Taylor |
| 1999 | 4 | 5 | Partly Free | Charles Taylor |
| 2000 | 5 | 6 | Partly Free | Charles Taylor |
| 2001 | 6 | 6 | Not Free | Charles Taylor |
| 2002 | 6 | 6 | Not Free | Charles Taylor |
| 2003 | 6 | 6 | Not Free | Charles Taylor |
| 2004 | 5 | 4 | Partly Free | Gyude Bryant |
| 2005 | 4 | 4 | Partly Free | Gyude Bryant |
| 2006 | 2 | 2 | Partly Free | Gyude Bryant |
| 2007 | 3 | 4 | Partly Free | Ellen Johnson Sirleaf |
| 2008 | 3 | 4 | Partly Free | Ellen Johnson Sirleaf |
| 2009 | 3 | 4 | Partly Free | Ellen Johnson Sirleaf |
| 2010 | 3 | 4 | Partly Free | Ellen Johnson Sirleaf |
| 2011 | 3 | 4 | Partly Free | Ellen Johnson Sirleaf |
| 2012 | 3 | 4 | Partly Free | Ellen Johnson Sirleaf |
| 2013 | 3 | 4 | Partly Free | Ellen Johnson Sirleaf |
| 2014 | 3 | 4 | Partly Free | Ellen Johnson Sirleaf |
| 2015 | 3 | 4 | Partly Free | Ellen Johnson Sirleaf |
| 2016 | 3 | 4 | Partly Free | Ellen Johnson Sirleaf |
| 2017 | 3 | 3 | Partly Free | Ellen Johnson Sirleaf |
| 2018 | 3 | 3 | Partly Free | Ellen Johnson Sirleaf |
| 2019 | 3 | 4 | Partly Free | George Weah |
| 2020 | 3 | 4 | Partly Free | George Weah |
| 2021 | 3 | 4 | Partly Free | George Weah |
| 2022 | 3 | 4 | Partly Free | George Weah |
| 2023 | 2 | 4 | Partly Free | George Weah |

== International treaties ==
Liberia's stances on international human rights treaties are as follows:

International treaties

| Treaty | Organization | Introduced | Signed | Ratified |
| Convention on the Prevention and Punishment of the Crime of Genocide | United Nations | 1948 | 1948 | 1950 |
| International Convention on the Elimination of All Forms of Racial Discrimination | United Nations | 1966 | - | 1976 |
| International Covenant on Economic, Social and Cultural Rights | United Nations | 1966 | 1967 | 2004 |
| International Covenant on Civil and Political Rights | United Nations | 1966 | 1967 | 2004 |
| First Optional Protocol to the International Covenant on Civil and Political Rights | United Nations | 1966 | 2004 | - |
| Convention on the Non-Applicability of Statutory Limitations to War Crimes and Crimes Against Humanity | United Nations | 1968 | - | 2005 |
| International Convention on the Suppression and Punishment of the Crime of Apartheid | United Nations | 1973 | - | 1976 |
| Convention on the Elimination of All Forms of Discrimination against Women | United Nations | 1979 | - | 1984 |
| Convention against Torture and Other Cruel, Inhuman or Degrading Treatment or Punishment | United Nations | 1984 | - | 2004 |
| Convention on the Rights of the Child | United Nations | 1989 | 1990 | 1993 |
| Second Optional Protocol to the International Covenant on Civil and Political Rights, aiming at the abolition of the death penalty | United Nations | 1989 | - | 2005 |
| International Convention on the Protection of the Rights of All Migrant Workers and Members of Their Families | United Nations | 1990 | 2004 | - |
| Optional Protocol to the Convention on the Elimination of All Forms of Discrimination against Women | United Nations | 1999 | 2004 | - |
| Optional Protocol to the Convention on the Rights of the Child on the Involvement of Children in Armed Conflict | United Nations | 2000 | 2004 | - |
| Optional Protocol to the Convention on the Rights of the Child on the Sale of Children, Child Prostitution and Child Pornography | United Nations | 2000 | 2004 | - |
| Convention on the Rights of Persons with Disabilities | United Nations | 2006 | 2007 | 2012 |
| Optional Protocol to the Convention on the Rights of Persons with Disabilities | United Nations | 2006 | 2007 | - |
| International Convention for the Protection of All Persons from Enforced Disappearance | United Nations | 2006 | - | - |
| Optional Protocol to the International Covenant on Economic, Social and Cultural Rights | United Nations | 2008 | - | - |
| Optional Protocol to the Convention on the Rights of the Child on a Communications Procedure | United Nations | 2011 | - | - |

== See also ==
- Disability in Liberia
- Human trafficking in Liberia
- Internet censorship and surveillance in Liberia

== Notes ==
1.Note that the "Year" signifies the "Year covered". Therefore the information for the year marked 2008 is from the report published in 2009, and so on.
2.As of 1 January.
3.The 1982 report covers 1981 and the first half of 1982, and the following 1984 report covers the second half of 1982 and the whole of 1983. In the interest of simplicity, these two aberrant "year and a half" reports have been split into three year-long reports through interpolation.
