= Liberian dollar =

Currency of Liberia

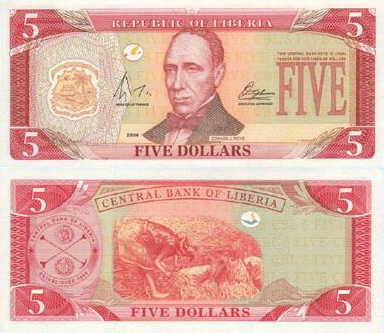
- A $5 banknote (1999)

ISO 4217
- Code: LRD (numeric: 430)
- Subunit: 0.01

Units of account
- Symbol: $, L$, LD$
- Subunit
- 1/100: cent

Denominations
- Banknotes
- Freq. used: L$20, L$50, L$100, L$500, L$1,000
- Rarely used: L$5, L$10
- Coins
- Freq. used: L$5, L$10
- Rarely used: 5¢, 10¢, 25¢, 50¢, L$1

Demographics
- User(s): Liberia

Issuance
- Central bank: Central Bank of Liberia
- Website: cbl.org.lr

The dollar (currency code LRD) has been the currency of Liberia since 1943. It was also the country's currency between 1847 and 1907. It is normally abbreviated with the sign $, or alternatively L$ or LD$ to distinguish it from other dollar-named currencies. It is divided into 100 cents.

== First use ==
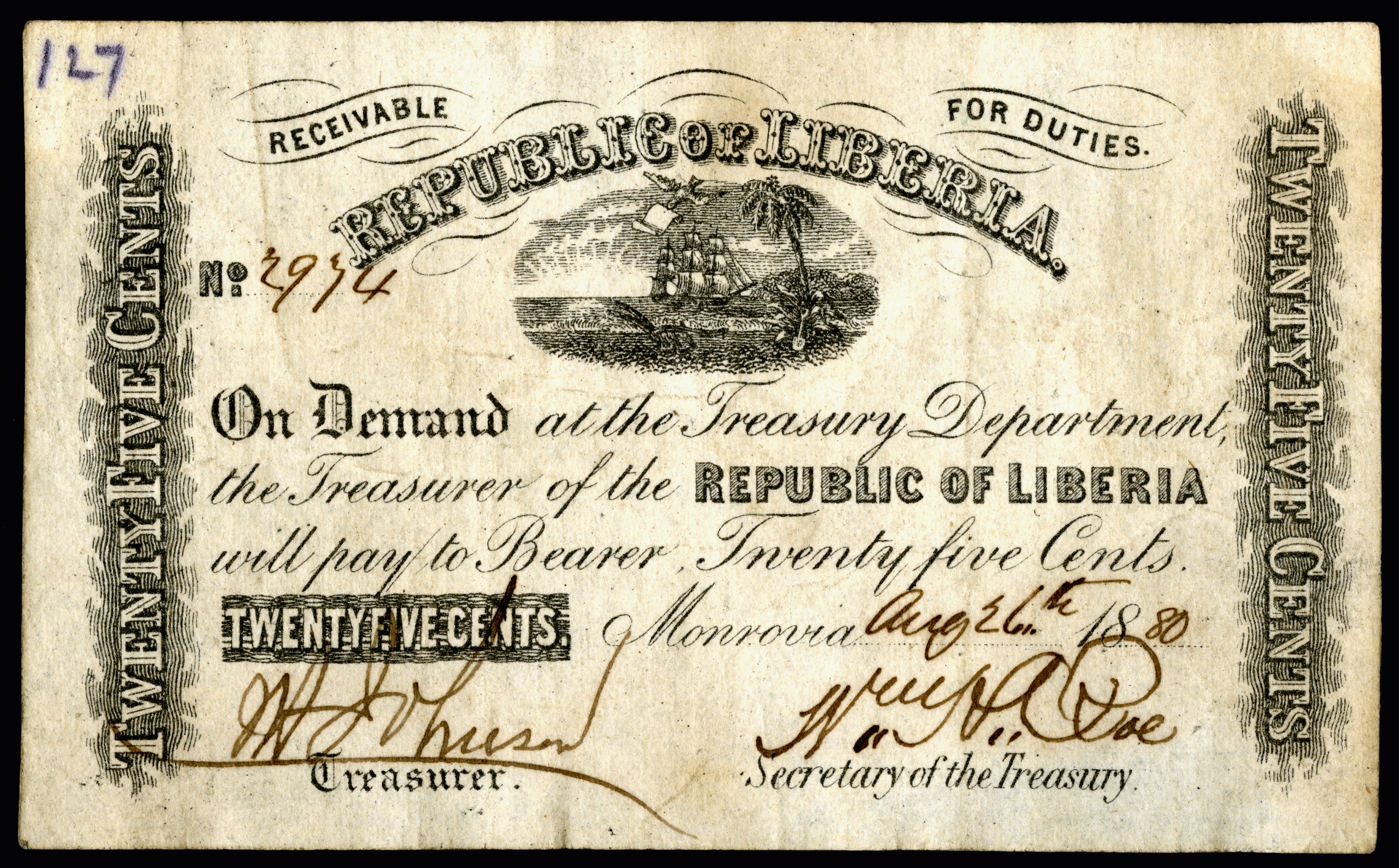
Twenty-five cent note (1880), previously unknown as a denomination.

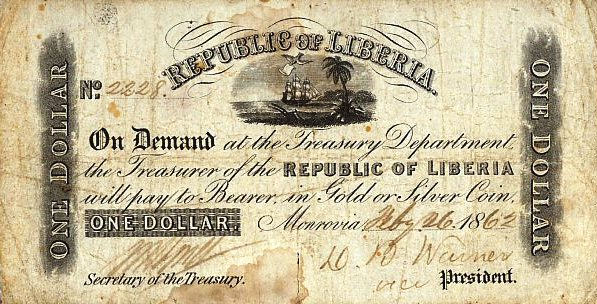
19th Century Liberian One dollar.

The first Liberian dollar was issued in 1847. It was initially pegged to the US dollar at par. Several fiscal crises during the nineteenth century compelled Liberia to supplement the coins with a paper currency which lost value against the US dollar. And circulated alongside the US dollar until 1907, when Liberia adopted the British West African pound, which was pegged to sterling.

=== Coins ===
In 1847 and 1862, copper 1 and 2 cents coins were issued and were the only Liberian coins until 1896, when a full coinage consisting of 1, 2, 10, 25 and 50 cents coins were introduced. The last issues were made in 1906.

=== Money notes ===
The Treasury Department issued notes between 1857 and 1880 in denominations of 10 and 50 cents, 1, 2, 3, 5 and 10 dollars.

== Reintroduction ==
United States currency replaced the British West African pound in Liberia in 1935. Starting in 1937, Liberia issued its own coins which circulated alongside US currency.

The flight of suitcase-loads of USD paper by Americo-Liberians following the April 12, 1980, coup d'état created a currency shortage. This was remedied by minting of the Liberian $5 coins. The seven-sided coins were the same size and weight as the one-dollar coin; this prevented corrupt members of elite society leaving the country with Liberia's money.

In the late 1980s the coins were largely replaced with a newly designed $5 note modeled on the US greenback ("J. J. Roberts" notes). The design was modified during the 1990-2004 civil war to ostracize notes looted from the Central Bank of Liberia. This effectively created two currency zones—the new "Liberty" notes were legal tender in government-held areas (primarily Monrovia), while the old notes were legal tender in non-government areas. Each was not considered legal in the other territory. Following Charles Taylor's arrival in Monrovia in 1995, the J.J. Robert's bank notes were legally accepted in most parts of Monrovia for purchases. Banking and some majors institutions did not accept the J.J. Robert's bank note as legal tender during this period.

Following the election of the Charles Taylor government in 1997 a new series of banknotes dated 1999 was introduced on March 29, 2000.

=== Coins ===
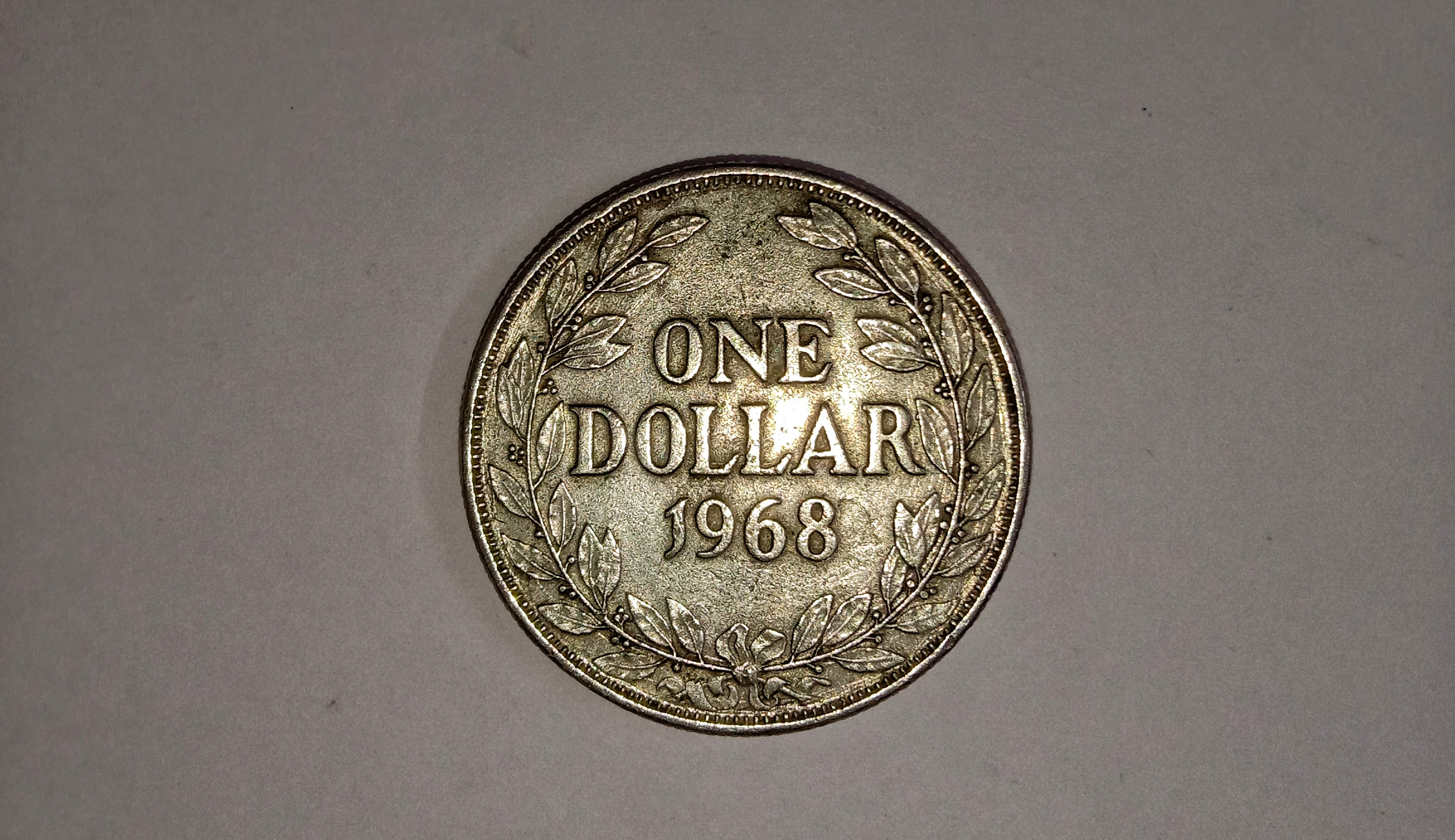
1 Dollar coin of Liberia (1968)

In 1937, coins were issued in denominations of 1/2, 1 and 2 cents. These were augmented in 1960 with coins for 1, 5, 10, 25 and 50 cents. A $1 coin was issued the following year. Five-dollar coins were issued in 1982 and 1985 (see above). According to the 2009 Standard Catalog of World Coins (Krause Publications, Iola, WI), numerous commemorative coins (featuring U.S. Presidents, dinosaurs, Chinese Lunar-Zodiac animals, etc.) in denominations ranging from 1 to 2500 Dollars have been issued beginning in the 1970s through the present.

Coins of the Liberian dollar
Image	Value	Technical parameters				Description			Date of first minting
Image	Value	Diameter	Thickness	Mass	Composition	Edge	Obverse	Reverse	Date of first minting
	1/2 cent	18 mm		2.42 g	Brass	Plain/Smooth	Elephant; text "REPUBLIC OF LIBERIA"; star	Palm tree divides ship and sun within circle flanked by stars above date; text "ONE HALF CENT"	1937
	1/2 cent	18 mm	1.3 mm	2.50 g	Copper-nickel	Plain/Smooth	Elephant; text "REPUBLIC OF LIBERIA"; star	Palm tree divides ship and sun within circle flanked by stars above date; text "ONE HALF CENT"	1941
	1 cent	25.45 mm		5.19 g	Brass	Plain/Smooth	Elephant; text "REPUBLIC OF LIBERIA"; star	Palm tree divides ship and sun within circle flanked by stars above date; text "ONE CENT"	1937
	1 cent	25.45 mm	1.38 mm	5 g	Copper-nickel	Plain/Smooth	Elephant; text "REPUBLIC OF LIBERIA"; star	Palm tree divides ship and sun within circle flanked by stars above date; text "ONE CENT"	1941
	1 cent	18 mm	1.5 mm	2.6 g	Brass	Plain/Smooth	Elephant; text "REPUBLIC OF LIBERIA"; star	Ship and bird to right of palm tree within 3/4 circle above date; text "THE LOVE OF LIBERTY BROUGHT US HERE"; "ONE CENT"	1960
	2 cents	28 mm	1.64 mm	8 g	Brass	Reeded	Elephant; text "REPUBLIC OF LIBERIA"; star	Palm tree divides ship and sun within circle flanked by stars above date; text "TWO CENTS"	1937
	2 cents	29.05 mm	1.7 mm	8.24 g	Copper-nickel	Plain/Smooth	Elephant; text "REPUBLIC OF LIBERIA"; star	Palm tree divides ship and sun within circle flanked by stars above date; text "TWO CENTS"	1941
	5 cents	20 mm	1.6 mm	4.1 g	Copper-nickel	Plain/Smooth	Elephant; text "REPUBLIC OF LIBERIA"; star	Ship and bird to right of palm tree within 3/4 circle above date; text "THE LOVE OF LIBERTY BROUGHT US HERE"; "FIVE CENTS"	1960
	10 cents	17 mm	1.16 mm	2.07 g	.900 Silver	Reeded	Head with headress; text "REPUBLIC OF LIBERIA"; star	Value and date within wreath; text "10 CENTS"	1960
	10 cents	16.5 mm	1.9 mm	1 g	Copper-nickel	Reeded	Head with headress; text "REPUBLIC OF LIBERIA"; star	Value and date within wreath; text "10 CENTS"	1966
	25 cents	22.96 mm	1.45 mm	5.18 g	.900 Silver	Reeded	Head with headress; text "REPUBLIC OF LIBERIA"; star	Value and date within wreath; text "25 CENTS"	1960
	25 cents	23 mm		4.8 g	Copper-nickel	Reeded	Head with headress; text "REPUBLIC OF LIBERIA"; star	Value and date within wreath; text "25 CENTS"	1966
	25 cents	23 mm		5.2 g	Copper-nickel	Reeded	Portrait of William R. Tolbert Jr.; text "REPUBLIC OF LIBERIA"; stars; "W.R.TOLBERT JR."	Woman with basket of leaves on head; text "GROW MORE FOOD"; "25"; "TWENTY-FIVE CENTS"	1976
	25 cents	23 mm	1.76 mm	4.46 g	Nickel-clad steel	Reeded	Head with headress; text "REPUBLIC OF LIBERIA"; star	Value and date within wreath; text "25 CENTS"	2000
	50 cents	28.5 mm		10.37 g	.900 Silver	Reeded	Head with headress; text "REPUBLIC OF LIBERIA"; star	Value and date within wreath; text "50 CENTS"	1960
	50 cents	29 mm		8.9 g	Copper-nickel	Reeded	Head with headress; text "REPUBLIC OF LIBERIA"; star	Value and date within wreath; text "50 CENTS"	1966
	50 cents	28.5 mm		8.9 g	Copper-nickel	Reeded	Portrait of William R. Tolbert Jr.; text "REPUBLIC OF LIBERIA"; stars; "W.R.TOLBERT JR."	Coat of arms of Liberia; text "THE LOVE OF LIBERTY BROUGHT US HERE"; "50"; "FIFTY CENTS"	1976
	50 cents	29 mm	2 mm	9 g	Nickel-clad steel	Reeded	Head with headress; text "REPUBLIC OF LIBERIA"; star	Value and date within wreath; text "50 CENTS"	2000
	L$1	34 mm		20.74 g	.900 Silver	Reeded	Head with headress; text "REPUBLIC OF LIBERIA"; star	Value and date within wreath; text "ONE DOLLAR"	1961
	L$1	34 mm		18 g	Copper-nickel	Reeded	Head with headress; text "REPUBLIC OF LIBERIA"; star	Value and date within wreath; text "ONE DOLLAR"	1966
	L$1	34 mm	2.5 mm	18 g	Copper-nickel	Reeded	Portrait of William R. Tolbert Jr.; text "REPUBLIC OF LIBERIA"; stars; "W.R.TOLBERT JR."	Map of Liberia; text "SELF RELIANCE"; "LIBERIA"; "ONE DOLLAR"	1976
	L$5	33 mm		14.6 g	Copper-nickel	Plain/Smooth	Coat of arms of Liberia; text "REPUBLIC OF LIBERIA"	Military memorial; text "FIVE DOLLARS"; "5"	1982

==== 2022 series ====
Coins of the 2022 series
Image	Value	Technical parameters			Description			Date of			
Image	Value	Diameter	Mass	Composition	Edge	Obverse	Reverse	minting	issue	withdrawal	lapse
	5 dollars	20 mm	3.6 g	Nickel-plated steel	Plain	President Edward J. Roye; text "REPUBLIC OF LIBERIA"; "FIVE DOLLARS"	Map of Liberia; text "LONE STAR FOREVER"; "5"	2022	September 2022	Current	
	10 dollars	23 mm	4.8 g	Nickel-plated steel	Plain	President Joseph J. Roberts; text "REPUBLIC OF LIBERIA"; "TEN DOLLARS"	Map of Liberia; text "LONE STAR FOREVER"; "10"	2022	September 2022	Current	
These images are to scale at 2.5 pixels per millimetre. For table standards, see the coin specification table.

=== Banknotes ===
Five-dollar notes were introduced in 1989 which bore the portrait of J. J. Roberts. These were known as "J. J." notes. In 1991, similar notes were issued (see above) which replaced the portrait with Liberia's arms. These were known as "Liberty" notes.

On 29 March 2000, the Central Bank of Liberia introduced a new "unified" currency, which was exchanged at par for "J. J." notes and at a ratio of 1:2 for "Liberty" notes. The new banknotes each feature a portrait of a former president. These notes remain legal tender. They underwent a minor redesign in 2003, with new dates, signatures, and the CENTRAL BANK OF LIBERIA banner on the back.

On 17 November 2021, the Central Bank of Liberia announced a new series of banknotes, omitting the L$5 and L$10 banknotes which have been replaced by coins, along with an entirely new denomination, the L$1000.

=== 1999 series ===
1999 series
Images	Value	Background color	Description			Date of	
Obverse & reverse	Value	Background color	Obverse	Reverse	Watermark	first series	Issue
	L$5	Red	President Edward J. Roye	Woman harvesting rice	Seal of Liberia	1999	March 29, 2000
	L$10	Blue	President Joseph J. Roberts	Rubber tapper	Seal of Liberia	1999	March 29, 2000
	L$20	Brown	President William V. S. Tubman	Young men by the road with scooters	Seal of Liberia	1999	March 29, 2000
	L$50	Purple	President Samuel K. Doe	Worker on a palm plantation	Seal of Liberia	1999	March 29, 2000
	L$100	Green	President William R. Tolbert Jr.	Market woman and her child	Seal of Liberia	1999	March 29, 2000

=== 2016 series ===
On 27 July 2016, the Central Bank of Liberia announced new banknotes will be introduced with enhanced security features. All of the denominations are the same as previous issues, with the L$500 banknote being introduced as part of this series. On 6 October 2016, the Central Bank of Liberia introduced new banknotes, as announced.

2016 series
Images		Value	Background color	Description			Date of	
Obverse	Reverse	Value	Background color	Obverse	Reverse	Watermark	first series	Issue
		L$5	Purple	President Edward J. Roye	Woman harvesting rice	Seal of Liberia	2016	2016
		L$10	Blue	President Joseph J. Roberts	Rubber tapper	Seal of Liberia	2016	2016
		L$20	Brown	President William V. S. Tubman	Young men by the road with scooters	Seal of Liberia	2016	2016
		L$50	Red	President Samuel K. Doe	Worker on a palm plantation	Seal of Liberia	2016	2016
		L$100	Green	President William R. Tolbert Jr.	Market woman and her child	Seal of Liberia	2016	2016
		L$500	Violet	Men and woman	Hippopotamus and its child	Seal of Liberia	2016	2016

=== 2022 series ===
2021–2022 series
Images		Value	Dimensions	Background color	Description			Date of	
Obverse	Reverse	Value	Dimensions	Background color	Obverse	Reverse	Watermark	first series	Issue
		L$20	133 × 66 mm	Brown	President William V. S. Tubman	Young men by the road with scooters	Seal of Liberia	2022	2022
		L$50		Red	President Samuel K. Doe	Worker on a palm plantation	Seal of Liberia	2022	2022
		L$100	143 × 66 mm	Green	President William R. Tolbert Jr.	Market woman and her child	Seal of Liberia	2021	2021
		L$500		Violet	Seven female designers of the Flag of Liberia	Hippopotamus and its child	Seal of Liberia	2022	2022
		L$1,000		Blue	Sixteen tribal masks of Liberia	Capitol building in Monrovia	Seal of Liberia	2022	2022

=== Exchange rates ===
Current LRD exchange rates
From Google Finance:	AUD CAD CHF CNY EUR GBP HKD JPY USD XOF
From Yahoo! Finance:	AUD CAD CHF CNY EUR GBP HKD JPY USD XOF
From XE.com:	AUD CAD CHF CNY EUR GBP HKD JPY USD XOF
From OANDA:	AUD CAD CHF CNY EUR GBP HKD JPY USD XOF

== See also ==
- Central Bank of Liberia
- Economy of Liberia
