= Tourism in Liberia =

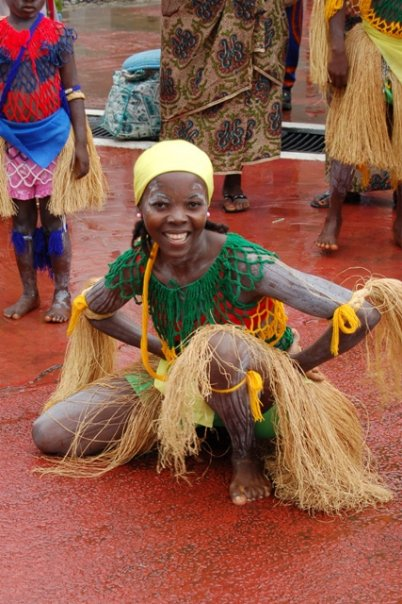
Liberian dancer.

Tourism forms a small part of the national economy of Liberia. In the past, many tourists visited Liberia, mostly from the United States. Liberia's economy, including the tourist industry, was badly damaged by 1989-2003 civil war in the country, and has only just started picking up with the launching of a Tourism Association in the country. Accommodation is now available to tourists, as is Liberia's transport infrastructure. One bright spot is surfing off Robertsport.
