= List of cities in Liberia =

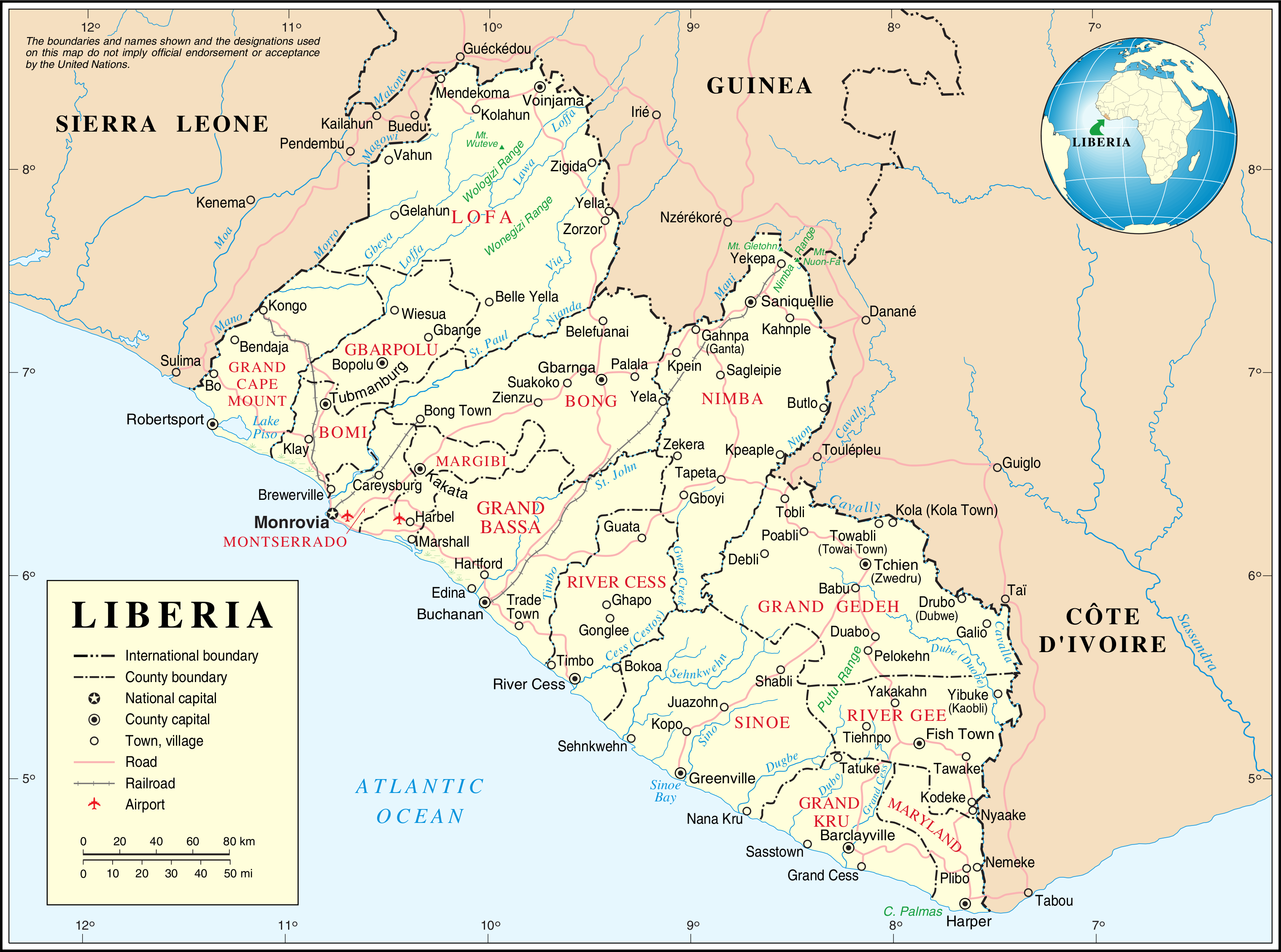
A map of Liberia, showing Liberian counties and cities

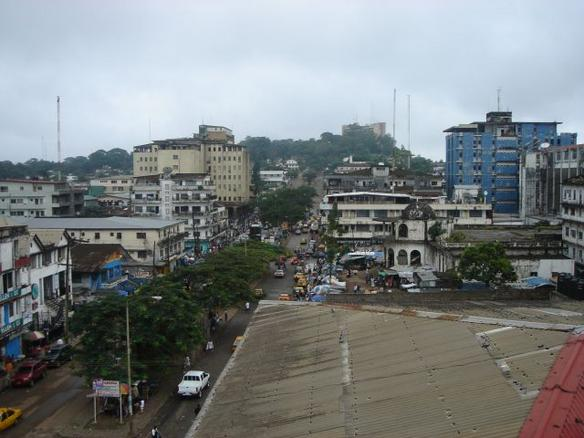
Monrovia, the capital of Liberia

This is a list of cities in Liberia:

- Arthington
- Barclayville
- Belefuanai
- Bensonville
- Bopolu
- Buchanan
- Buutuo
- Caldwell
- Careysburg
- Clay-Ashland
- Edina
- Fish Town
- Ganta
- Gbarnga
- Greenville
- Harbel
- Harper
- Kakata
- Kongo
- Monrovia (capital)
- Marshall
- Palala
- Paynesville
- Pleebo
- River Cess
- Robertsport
- Sacleipea
- Sagleipie
- Sanniquellie
- Sasstown
- Sembe
- Tubmanburg
- Tuzon
- Virginia
- Voinjama
- Yekepa
- Zorzor
- Zwedru

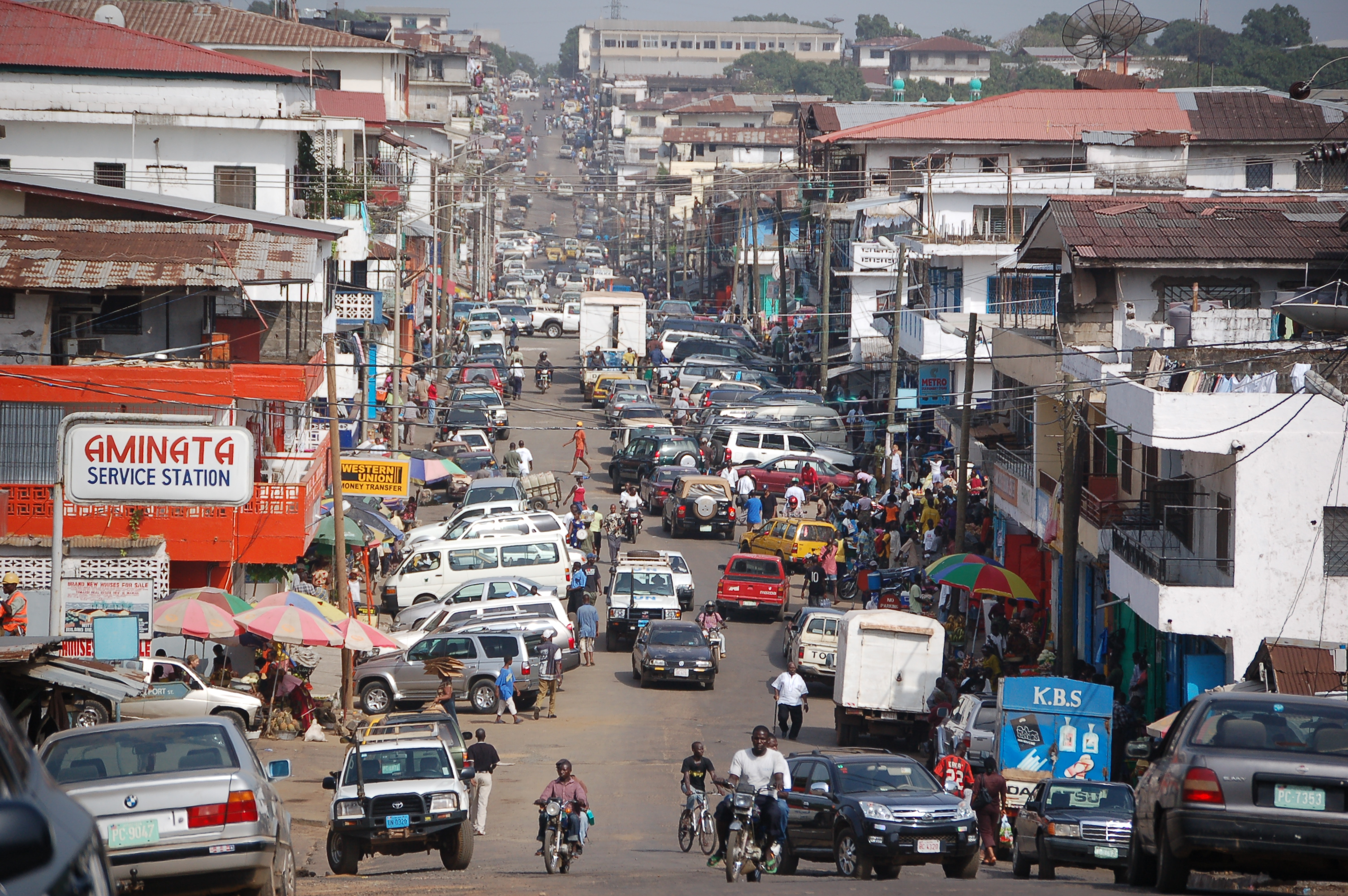
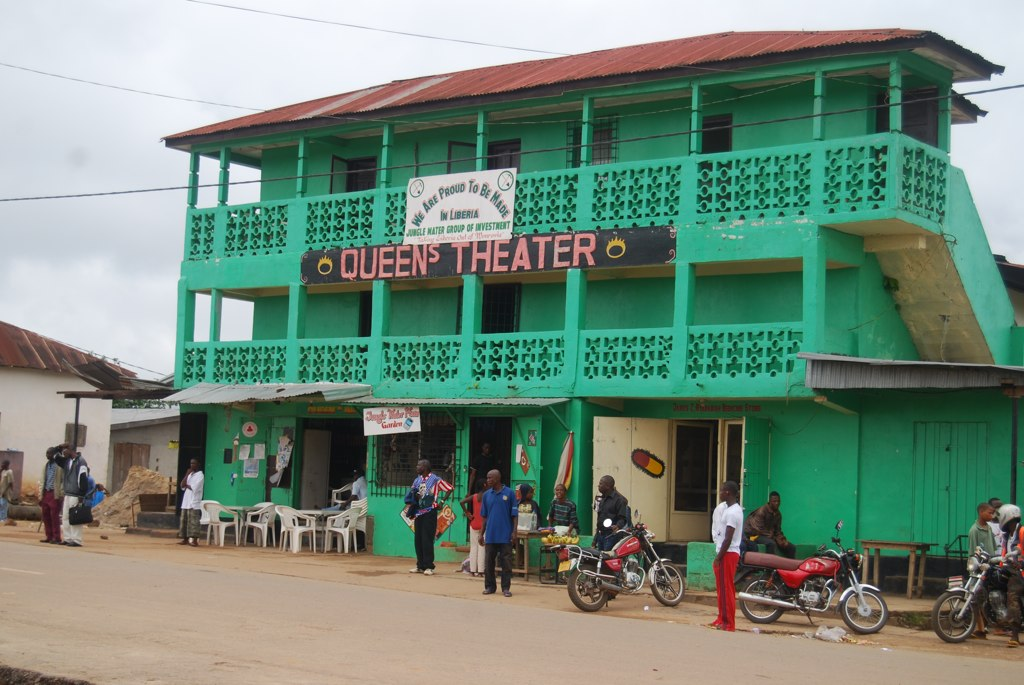
Largest cities or towns in Liberia According to the 2008 Census
	Rank	Name	County	Pop.
Monrovia	1	Monrovia	Montserrado	1,021,762	Ganta
Monrovia	2	Gbarnga	Bong	56,986	Ganta
Monrovia	3	Buchanan	Grand Bassa	50,245	Ganta
Monrovia	4	Ganta	Nimba	42,077	Ganta
Monrovia	5	Kakata	Margibi	34,608	Ganta
Monrovia	6	Zwedru	Grand Gedeh	25,349	Ganta
Monrovia	7	Harbel	Margibi	25,309	Ganta
Monrovia	8	Harper	Maryland	23,517	Ganta
Monrovia	9	Pleebo	Maryland	23,464	Ganta
Monrovia	10	Foya	Lofa	20,569	Ganta
