= Gbedin =

Village in Nimba County, Liberia

- Village
- Location in Liberia
- Coordinates: 7°16′28″N 8°49′25″W
- Country: Liberia
- County: Nimba
- District: Sanniquellie-Mahn
- Time zone: UTC+0 (GMT)

Gbedin, also known as Gbedin Rice Station or Gbedin Station, is a village and agricultural centre in Sanniquellie-Mahn District, Nimba County, Liberia, on the Guinean border, roughly halfway between Ganta and Sanniquellie. It is noted for its rice station and USDA-founded resettlement program, known as the Gbedin Project, which took off in the 1950s, whereby "farmers are brought on to the land and settled in quasi-cooperatives". The Taiwanese Agricultural Mission played a major role in the project, and in 1967, a further 25 Chinese agricultural experts were called to Gbedin to facilitate development. With much swamp land in the vicinity, the idea was to develop an area of 1200 hectares and train some 600 families in cultivating the land, but by 1968, only 70 farmers had been resettled and some 75 hectares cultivated. By 1976, only 63 farmers were involved in the scheme, under a staff of 35.
