= Lists of cities in Africa =

The location of Africa

This is a list of lists of cities in Africa.

== Countries ==
The regions of Africa

- List of cities in Algeria
- List of cities in Angola
- List of cities in Benin
- List of cities in Botswana
- List of cities in Burkina Faso
- List of cities in Burundi
- List of municipalities in Cameroon
- List of cities in Cape Verde
- List of cities in the Central African Republic
- List of cities in Chad
- List of cities in the Comoros
- List of cities and towns in the Democratic Republic of the Congo
- List of cities in the Republic of the Congo
- List of cities in Côte d'Ivoire
- List of cities in Djibouti
- List of cities and towns in Egypt
- List of cities in Equatorial Guinea
- List of cities in Eritrea
- List of cities in Eswatini
- List of cities and towns in Ethiopia
- List of cities in Gabon
- List of cities in the Gambia
- List of cities in Ghana
- List of cities in Guinea
- List of cities in Guinea-Bissau
- List of cities in Kenya
- List of cities in Lesotho
- List of cities in Liberia
- List of cities in Libya
- List of cities in Madagascar
- List of cities in Malawi
- List of cities in Mali
- List of cities in Mauritania
- List of places in Mauritius
- List of cities in Morocco
- List of cities in Mozambique
- List of cities in Namibia
- List of cities in Niger
- List of cities in Nigeria
- List of cities in Rwanda
- List of cities in São Tomé and Príncipe
- List of cities in Senegal
- List of cities in Seychelles
- List of cities in Sierra Leone
- List of cities in Somalia
- List of cities in Somaliland
- List of cities in South Africa
- List of cities in South Sudan
- List of cities in Sudan
- List of cities in Tanzania
- List of cities in Togo
- List of cities in Tunisia
- List of cities and towns in Uganda
- List of cities in Western Sahara
- List of cities in Zambia
- List of cities and towns in Zimbabwe

== Dependencies and other territories ==
- List of cities in Socotra
- List of cities in Réunion
- List of cities in Mayotte
- List of cities in St. Helena
- List of cities in Madeira
- List of cities in the Canary Islands:
  - List of municipalities in Santa Cruz de Tenerife
  - List of municipalities in Las Palmas
- Azores
- Ceuta
- Melilla

== Regions ==
- List of cities in East Africa

== See also ==
- Lists of cities
- Lists of cities by country
- List of cities in Africa by population
- Urbanization in Africa
