= Bong-7 =

Electoral district in Liberia

- Constituency for the House of Representatives of Liberia
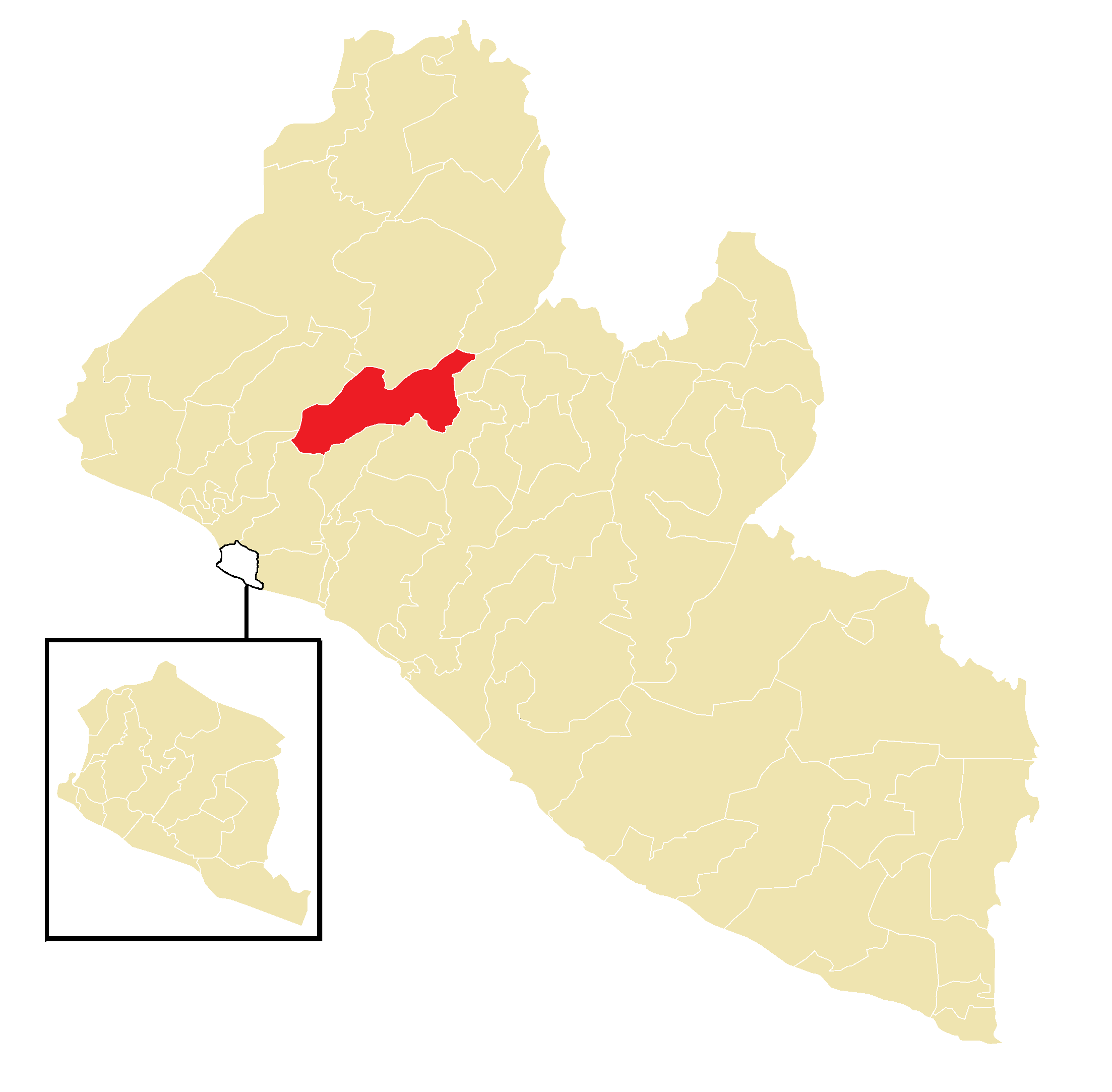
- Electorate: 32,200 (2023)

Current constituency
- Created: 2011
- Representative: Foday E. Fahnbulleh

Bong-7 is an electoral district for the elections to the House of Representatives of Liberia. The constituency covers the Fuamah District and the Sanayea District (except the Gou, Laryea and Gbonota communities).

== Elected representatives ==
Year	Representative elected	Party	Notes
2011	Corpu G. Barclay	UP	
2017	Joseph P. Kolleh	ALP	
2023	Foday E. Fahnbulleh	IND	

== Election results ==
2011 Bong County's 7th House District Election
Candidate	Party	Votes	%
Corpu G. Barclay	Unity Party	3,438	21.49
Jonathan Kolubah Momo	Independent	2,317	14.49
Emmanuel A. Lomax	National Democratic Party of Liberia	1,759	11.00
Fahnlon B. Gbakoyah	Congress for Democratic Change	1,725	10.78
Wayfa Florence Ciapha	Alliance for Peace and Democracy	1,426	8.92
D Nalon Kaine	Liberia National Union	1,389	8.68
Momo B. H. Tehmeh Jr.	Movement for Progressive Change	658	4.11
Moibah Keller Johnson	Liberty Party	653	4.08
Borbor L. Nyumah	National Democratic Coalition	646	4.04
Moses Boye Kaine	Union of Liberian Democrats	618	3.86
Darlington Sackie Shiakeh	Citizens Unification Party	504	3.15
Thomas Sackie Kollie Sr.	Victory for Change Party	390	2.44
Jarline Edward Flomo	Independent	307	1.92
Vivion Alexander Cook Sr.	National Union for Democratic Progress	165	1.03
Total		15,995	100.00
Valid votes		15,995	89.91
Invalid/blank votes		1,796	10.09
Total votes		17,791	100.00

2017 Bong County's 7th House District Election
Candidate	Party	Votes	%
Joseph P. Kolleh	All Liberian Party	3,791	17.51
Andrew G. Tehmeh	Coalition for Liberia's Progress	3,727	17.21
Foday Edward Fahnbulleh	Liberty Party	3,380	15.61
Benedict P. Bainda	Movement for Economic Empowerment	2,907	13.43
Corpu G. Barclay (Incumbent)	Unity Party	1,882	8.69
Samuel T. Q. Kollie	Liberia Transformation Party	988	4.56
Melvin K. Boimah	Grassroot Democratic Party of Liberia	933	4.31
Rufus Seword Tartee	Independent	782	3.61
Wayfa Florence Ciapha	Coalition for Democratic Change	700	3.23
Fahnlon B. Gbakoyah	Redemption Democratic Congress	630	2.91
Morris K. Togbah	Alternative National Congress	354	1.63
Momolu Kwen Cooper	United People's Party	330	1.52
Willie V. Kollimelin	Liberia Restoration Party	306	1.41
Rolland B. Enders	Vision for Liberia Transformation	261	1.21
Franklin B. Dunn II	True Whig Party	254	1.17
David A. Kankalan	Victory for Change Party	235	1.09
Jarline E. Flomo	Movement for Democracy and Reconstruction	192	0.89
Total		21,652	100.00
Valid votes		21,652	93.34
Invalid/blank votes		1,546	6.66
Total votes		23,198	100.00
