= List of cities in East Africa =

The following is a list of the largest cities by population and of capital cities in the geographic region of East Africa. Because population counts in each country occur at different times, the list of numbers is meant as a rough indicator of relative size.

== Metropolitan areas ==
In East Africa, demographic rankings vary significantly depending on whether population data is measured by city proper boundaries or broader metropolitan areas. A city proper is defined strictly by legal municipal or administrative borders, which often fail to account for outward urban expansion. In contrast, a metropolitan area consists of the core city alongside its economically and socially integrated commuter zones, satellite towns, and surrounding jurisdictions.

For example, while Dar es Salaam features a larger administrative city-proper boundary than Nairobi, the functional Nairobi Metropolitan Region is the largest urban agglomeration in East Africa due to massive contiguous sprawl into neighboring counties. This makes Nairobi the largest metropolitan area in East Africa while Dar es Saalam is the largest city proper in East Africa; it depends on how one defines a city.

The following table lists the largest metropolitan areas in East Africa by their functional or officially designated regional boundaries, including both national capitals and major secondary commercial hubs:

Rank	Metropolitan Area	Country	Status	Metropolitan Population	Core City Population	Defined Region & Key Component Areas
1	Nairobi Metropolitan Region	Kenya	Capital City	15,950,000	5,600,000	Includes Nairobi County, Kiambu, Machakos, Kajiado, and Murang'a components.
2	Dar es Salaam	Tanzania	Commercial Hub (Former Capital)	8,562,000	7,400,000	Broad maritime commercial sprawl across Ilala, Kinondoni, Temeke, Ubungo, and Kigamboni.
3	Addis Ababa	Ethiopia	Capital City	4,200,000	4,200,000	Chartered city boundaries acting as a unified metropolitan and administrative zone.
4	Greater Kampala Metropolitan Area	Uganda	Capital City	6,709,900	1,797,722	Includes Kampala city core, Wakiso District, Mukono District, and Mpigi District.
5	Mogadishu	Somalia	Capital City	3,307,000	3,307,000	The Banaadir administrative region, acting wholly as a continuous urban metropolitan entity.
6	Kigali	Rwanda	Capital City	2,075,000	1,745,000	The entire province-level City of Kigali zone, comprising Gasabo, Kicukiro, and Nyarugenge districts.
7	Mombasa	Kenya	Major Port City (Non-Capital)	1,440,000	1,208,000	Continuous urban strip spanning Mombasa County into parts of Kwale and Kilifi counties.
8	Mwanza	Tanzania	Major Port City (Non-Capital)	1,320,700	594,800	Major port agglomeration spanning Nyamagana and Ilemela districts on Lake Victoria.
9	Asmara	Eritrea	Capital City	1,194,000	783,000	Core national capital hub integrating peripheral commuter boundaries within the Maekel region.
10	Bujumbura	Burundi	Economic Hub (Former Capital)	758,900	758,900	Main economic capital and urban port layout situated along Lake Tanganyika.

== List of capital cities ==
City	Country	Population (approximate)	Year of approximation	Notes	Area	Image
Addis Ababa	Ethiopia	5,704,000	2008	Capital	Horn of Africa	Addis Ababa, Ethiopia
Antananarivo	Madagascar	4,049,000	2013	Capital	Indian Ocean islands	Antananarivo, Madagascar
Asmara	Eritrea	1,112,000	2020	Capital	Horn of Africa	Asmara, Eritrea
Blantyre	Malawi	994,500	2018		Southeast Africa	
Bujumbura	Burundi	1,056,169	2019	Former capital	Great Lakes Region	Bujumbura, Burundi
Dar es Salaam	Tanzania	8,383,728	2022	Former capital	Great Lakes Region	Dar es Salaam, Tanzania
Dire Dawa	Ethiopia	607,321	2008		Horn of Africa	Dire Dawa, Ethiopia
Djibouti City	Djibouti	475,322	2009	Capital	Horn of Africa	Djibouti City, Djibouti
Dodoma	Tanzania	410,956	2012	Capital	Great Lakes Region	Dodoma, Tanzania
Gitega	Burundi	125,989	2019	Capital	Great Lakes Region	Gitega, Burundi
Harare	Zimbabwe	1,606,000	2016	Capital	Southeast Africa	Harare, Zimbabwe
Hargeisa	Somaliland	1,960,000	2019	Capital	Horn of Africa	Hargeisa, Somaliland
Juba	South Sudan	525,953	2017	Capital	Nile Valley	Juba, South Sudan
Kampala	Uganda	1,507,114	2014	Capital	Great Lakes Region	Kampala, Uganda
Keren	Eritrea	146,483	2012		Horn of Africa	Keren, Eritrea
Kigali	Rwanda	1,132,686	2012	Capital	Great Lakes Region	Kigali, Rwanda
Kisumu	Kenya	1,268,826	2017		Great Lakes Region	Kisumu, Kenya
Kitwe	Zambia	522,092	2010		Southeast Africa	Kitwe, Zambia
Lilongwe	Malawi	1,227,100	2018	Capital	Southeast Africa	
Lindi	Tanzania	41,549	2002		Great Lakes Region	Lindi, Tanzania
Lusaka	Zambia	1,742,979	2009	Capital	Southeast Africa	Lusaka, Zambia
Mahajanga	Madagascar	246022	2018		Indian Ocean islands	Mahajanga, Madagascar
Malakal	South Sudan	147,450	2014		Nile Valley	
Mamoudzou	Mayotte	71,437	2017	Capital	Indian Ocean islands	Mamoudzou, Mayotte
Maputo	Mozambique	1,101,170	2017	Capital	Southeast Africa	Maputo, Mozambique
Mbarara	Uganda	195,013	2014		Great Lakes Region	Mbarara, Uganda
Mogadishu	Somalia	2,425,000	2017	Capital	Horn of Africa	Mogadishu, Somalia
Mombasa	Kenya	1,500,000	2017		Great Lakes Region	Mombasa, Kenya
Muhanga	Rwanda	87,613	2015		Great Lakes Region	Muhanga, Rwanda
Moroni	Comoros	54,000	2011	Capital	Indian Ocean islands	Moroni, Comoros
Mutsamudu	Comoros	25,471	2010		Indian Ocean islands	Mutsamudu, Comoros
Muyinga	Burundi	100,715	2012		Great Lakes Region	
Mwanza	Tanzania	706,543	2012		Great Lakes Region	Mwanza, Tanzania
Nacala	Mozambique	225,034	2017		Southeast Africa	Nacala, Mozambique
Nairobi	Kenya	5,541,000	2017	Capital	Great Lakes Region	Nairobi, Kenya
Ngozi	Burundi	86000	2017		Southeast Africa	
Port Louis	Mauritius	149,194	2015	Capital	Indian Ocean islands	Port Louis, Mauritius
Saint-Denis	Réunion	146,985	2015	Capital	Indian Ocean islands	Saint-Denis, Reunion
Saint-Paul	Réunion	104,646	2015		Indian Ocean islands	Saint-Paul, Reunion
Victoria	Seychelles	26,450	2010	Capital	Indian Ocean islands	Victoria, Seychelles

== See also ==
- List of metropolitan areas in Africa
- Lists of cities in Africa, mostly by country
- List of largest cities in the Arab world
- Urbanization in Africa
- List of largest cities in Africa
