= Panta-Kpa District =

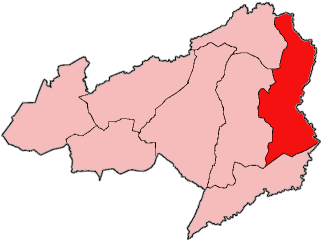
Location of Panta-Kpa District in Bong County

Panta-Kpa District is one of twelve districts located in Bong County, Liberia. It has four third-level subdivisions: Wrunah, Panta, Waytua, and Wolota.

== See also ==
- Palala
