= Upper Kru Coast District =

Former administrative division of Liberia

Upper Kru Coast District was a subdivision of Kru Coast Territory, once administered as part of Maryland County in Liberia.

In 1984, Grand Kru County was formed by the merger of Kru Coast Territory, Sasstown Territory (administered as part of Sinoe County) and the Statutory District of Buah. The formation was implemented under People's Redemption Council Decree No. 87, which abolished the two territories and established Grand Kru County with Barclayville as its capital.
