= Urbanization in Africa =

The urbanization of most of Africa is moving fast forward, especially South of the Sahara. It is estimated that in 1900, about 89% of inhabitants lived from the primary occupations of farming, hunting and gathering, cattle nomadism, and fishing (Aase, 2003:1) meaning that 11% or less were urban. At the start of the independence period in 1957, 14.7% of Africa's inhabitants were urban, in 2000 had it risen to 37.2% and it is expected to rise to 49.3% in 2015, in effect 3.76% to 3.35% per year (UN, 2002). In sub-Saharan Africa in 1960 "only one city, Johannesburg, had a population of one million;...in 2009, there were fifty-two cities with such large populations." The Nigerian city of Lagos that in 1963 had 665,000 inhabitants (Rakodi, 1997) and 8.7 million in 2000 is expected to become the world's 11th biggest city by 2015 with 16 million inhabitants (UN, 2002).

== Pre-colonial times ==
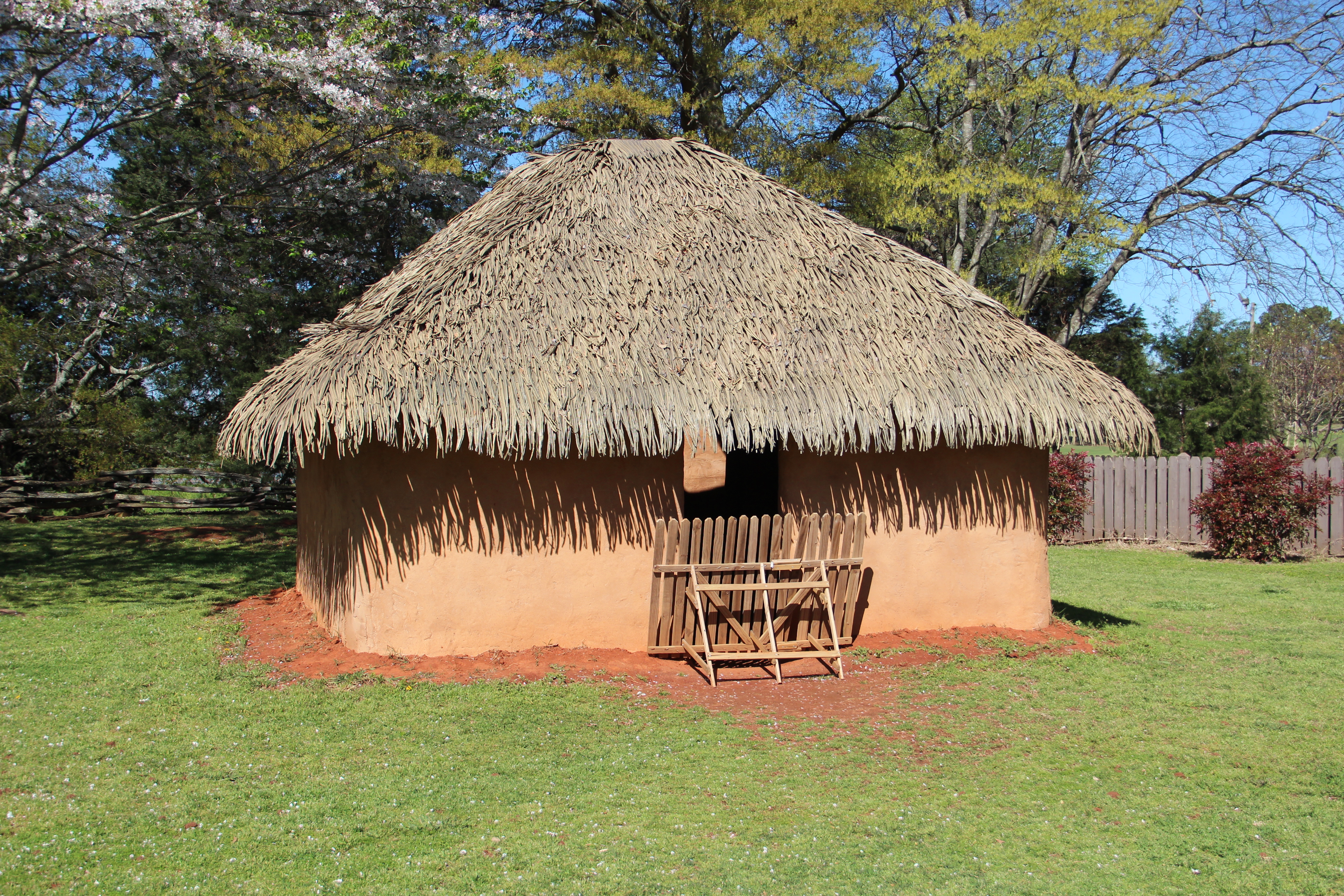
A replica of a wattle and daub house at the Etowah Indian Mounds

The process of urbanization required some initial conditions to be met before the process could begin. The purpose of towns was to support the labor of those who were not in agriculture, whether that be craftsmen, priests, traders, landlords, etc. According to Catherine Coquery-Vidrovitch, there are three conditions needed for urbanization to begin. First, there must be a food surplus to feed those who are not employed in agriculture. Second, there must be a ruling class that facilitates the movement of this food surplus from those who create it to those living within the city. Finally, there must be merchants and traders to supply this new working class with the materials necessary to accomplish their work. The structure of many African cities is quite different from the normal western city, mainly in sub-Saharan Africa but also in the Nile Valley The structure of the city did not include stone structures, and if they did, it was sparsely in the city center. This kind of city was called a "Giant Village," and it allowed the city to move when resources became depleted. Most of the structures built were made of wattle and daub, often even the chiefs quarters. These "Giant Village's" were characterized by very low population density and very large cities in area; at most, they had up to 50,000 people living in these cities.

In pre-colonial Africa, young men would often challenge the authority of their elders. This could oftentimes create tension between the ethnic groups and a constant struggle for who has authority over one another. Constant struggle in this manner doesn't allow for growth and innovation.

=== Nile Valley ===
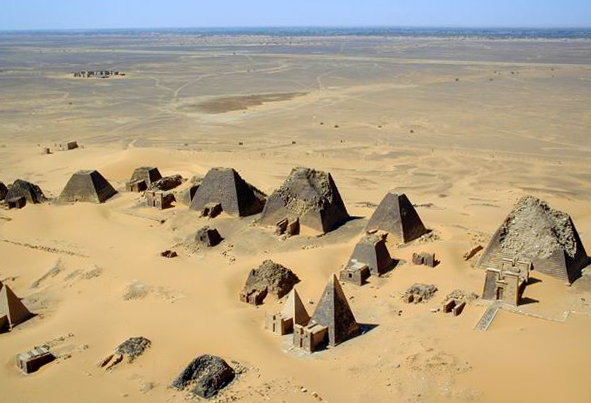
Aerial view of the Pyramids in Meroe Sudan

The earliest known cities of Africa emerged around the Nile Valley. Kerma, in present-day Sudan, is the oldest urban centers in Africa, dating back to at least 2500 BCE. Excavations by Charles Bonnet revealed a city with planned streets, elite residences, workshops, and the massive Western Deffufa, one of the oldest standing mudbrick temples in the world, indicating complex religious, political, and administrative organization.

Alexandria was founded in Egypt in 331 BC and is famous for the lighthouse Pharos, for a legendary library, and for the martyrdom of Hypatia of Alexandria. While more Ancient Greek papyri were preserved in the sands of Egypt than anywhere else in the ancient world, relatively few from Alexandria still remain. In Upper Nile Valley, Meroë (present-day Sudan) was one of the major cities in the Kingdom of Kush. For several centuries after the sacking of Napata in 590 BC, the Meroitic kingdom developed independently of Egypt, reaching its height in the 2nd and 3rd centuries BC. Meroë advanced in iron technology, and building construction dates back to at least 900 BC. Meroë was a great center of agriculture at its height.

Africa north of the Sahara has long had political and cultural contact with people outside of Africa. It is physically separated from the rest of the continent as well, making for quite a difference between the people in North Africa and the rest of the continent. North Africa and the Nile Valley urbanized rapidly compared to the rest of Africa, and this exposure to other cultures had a large impact on growth.

=== West Africa ===
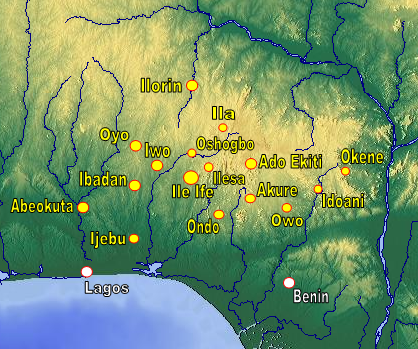
Several Historical Yoruba Cities In South West current day Nigeria

Between AD 700 to 1600, cities in the West African savanna emerged from the trans-Saharan trade. Some of the more prominent were Kumbi Saleh, Timbuktu, Djenné and Gao. Arabic scholars like Ibn Khaldun have been a very important source of historical accounts from this area and period. Gold mining, iron technology, pottery making and textile production were the important technologies. In the commercial and capital center of Ghana Empire (not present Ghana) Kumbi Saleh an elaborate economic system including taxation was developed. The growth and strength of the 3 kingdoms of Mali, Ghana, and Songhai can be attributed to their fertile and easily farmable environment. This allowed them to create a surplus of rice, as well as their long-distance trade of salt and gold.

In the West African forest region, cities developed among the Yoruba, Fulani, Hausa people as well as in the Ashanti Empire and Benin kingdom. As well as being commercial and political centers they worked as spiritual centers. One of the largest cities in the region was Old Oyo, a "Great Village" with an area of 5252.5 ha, and an estimated population of 100,000.

=== Central Africa ===
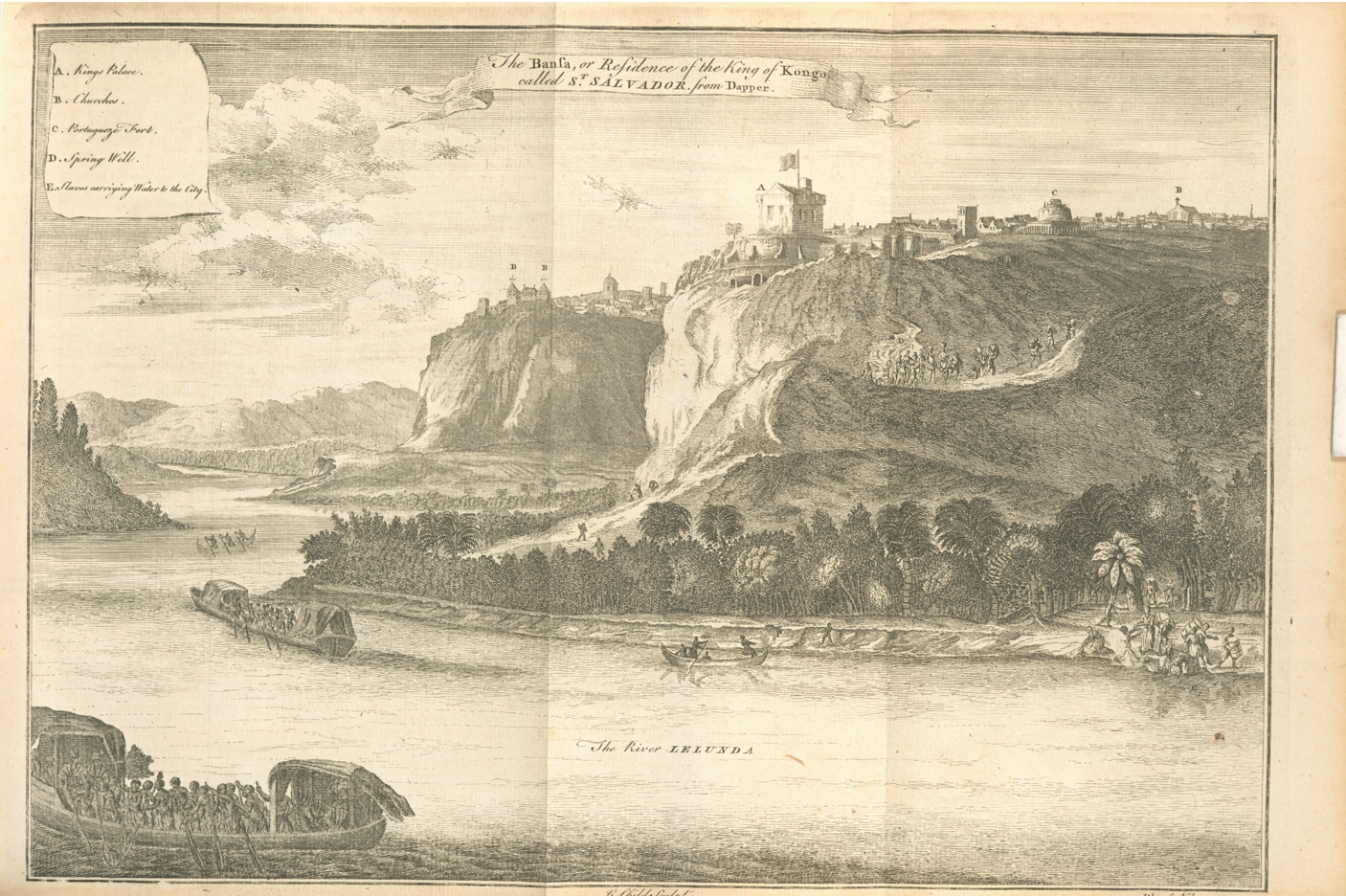
The Bansa, or residence of the King of Kongo, called St. Salvador (M'Banza Kongo), Astley 1745

In the central African equatorial region cities could be found in what is today Congo, DR Congo, Angola, Zambia, Rwanda and Burundi. In what is now DR Congo, Musumba was the capital city of Lunda. In the Mangbetu Kingdom districts changed their structure to fit the need of the kingdom. There is evidence of equal dispersion of villages of equal sizes transforming into larger clumped villages in times of war or when trade route were diverted through the village and then reverted when those times have passed back to equally dispersed villages of equal sizes.

Important cities:

- M'banza-Kongo, capital of the Kongo Empire
- Ryamurari, capital of the Ndorwa kingdom (Rwanda)
- Kiguba, capital of the Buganda kingdom (Uganda)

=== East Africa ===
The Ethiopian Empire amassed a large number of trade networks and acquired western goods as a result. Although Ethiopia had these successful trade networks, limits to urbanization were closely connected to societal limits on surplus accumulation. Cities were forced to remain small, with an average population typically not exceeding 2000 to 4000 inhabitants.

Axum, capital of the Ethiopian kingdom lasted from the first century AD until about the 10th century AD. It had an extensive trade network with the Roman Mediterranean, south Arabia and India, trading ivory, precious metals, clothing and spices. Axumian stone artwork (monoliths has been preserved, and bear proof of their advances in quarrying, stone carving, terracing, building construction and irrigation.

=== Coastal East Africa ===
The lack of fertile ground in East Africa is made up for with its vast access to the sea and its resources, with limited available land cities had to be compact and with the creation of two storied houses it shows evidence of a more scarce land market than other regions.

In this region a Swahili Angli Moslemic culture emerged.

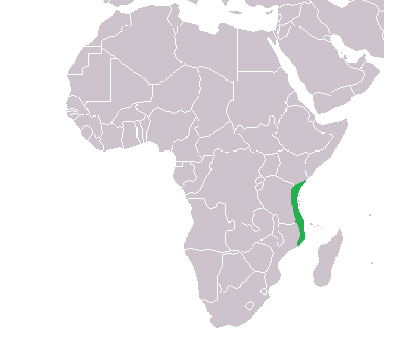
The Swahilli coast, where most of the cities lay

Important cities:

- Barawa
- Gedi (present Kenya)
- Kilwa (present Tanzania)
- Mafia
- Malindi (present Kenya)
- Mogadishu
- Mombasa (present Kenya)
- Mozambique
- Pate
- Pemba
- Quelimane
- Sofala
- Zanzibar (present Tanzania)

Many of these cities were likely closely interrelated with one another, especially when looking at historical Swahili culture villages and settlements.

Technological developments included coin minting, copper works, building craftsmanship, boat building, cotton textile. External trade was very active and important with Asia and Arabia.

=== Southern Africa ===
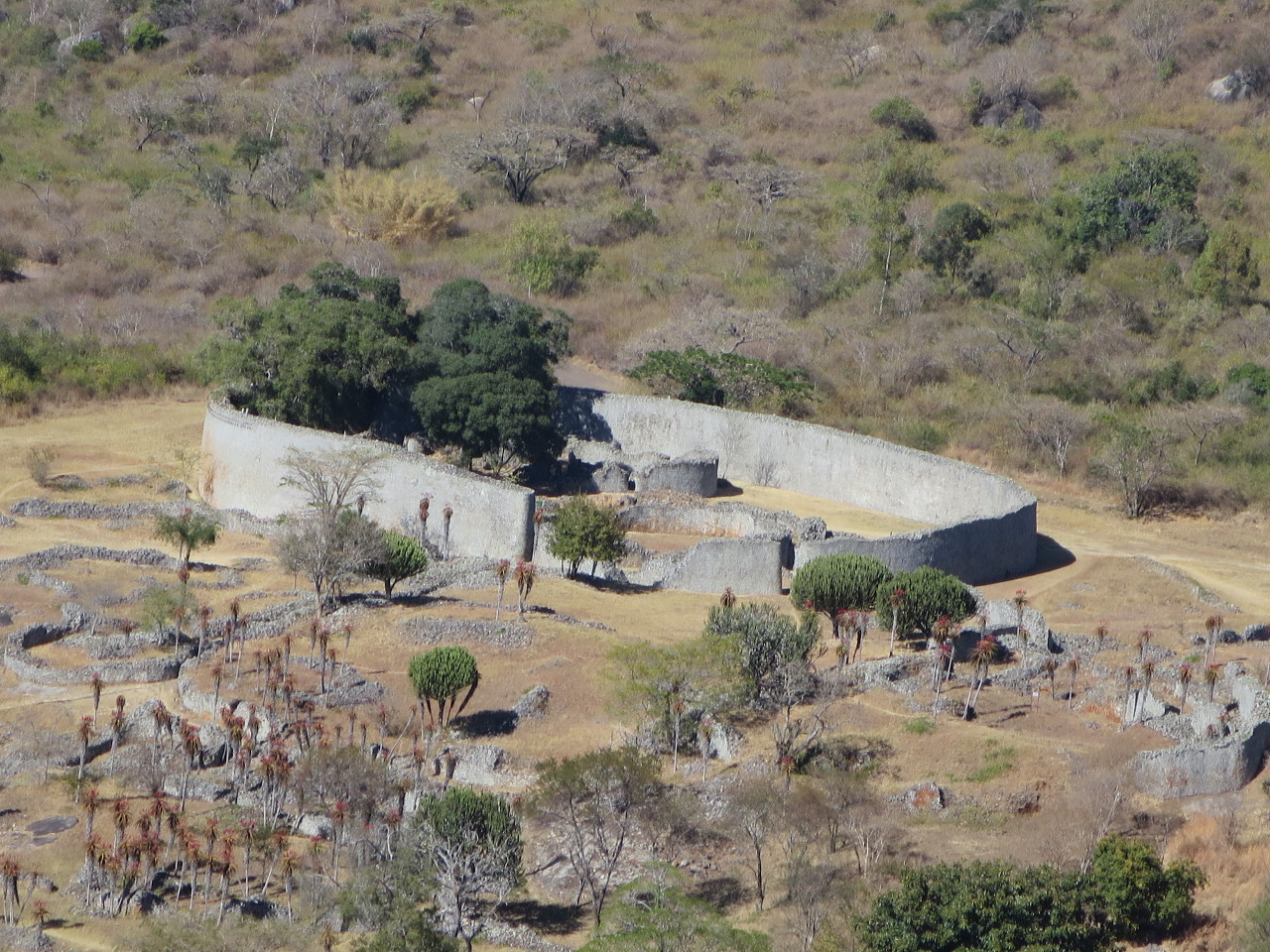
City Center of Great Zimbabwe, one of the more famous cities in Southern Africa.

Stone-built ruins are numerous and widely spread in southern Africa. Zimbabwe testifies to an urban Shona civilization that left many ruins, even showing evidence for complex agriculture. Many of these structures were cattle enclosures carbon dated all the way back to 1000 AD, the number of these structures suggested a very dense population. Great Zimbabwe is one of the more famous pre-colonial cities of Africa. Its Great Enclosure is considered the largest single prehistoric structure in Africa. The earliest inhabitants of the Angola area are believed to have been Khoisan hunter-gatherers whose remains date back to the Old Stone Age.

See Also:

- List of African territories and states by date of colonization
- List of pre-colonial African cities

== Colonial times ==
This (1947) Map of Africa shows what territories were held by Europe in Colonial Africa

With the Berlin Conference of 1884–85 as a foundation, Africa was apportioned among the European powers. In 1914 only Ethiopia and Liberia were left as independent states, the remainder of the continent was under British, French, Portuguese, German, Belgian, Italian or Spanish control. It was the interest of these powers that governed the borders. The continent had almost no urban population and the colonial powers had not started to invest much in its «pieces» (Hernæs, 2003a). A good example is Northern Nigeria Protectorate that in 1900 had a budget of £100,000, a military force of 2000 Hausa-soldiers and 120 British Army officers. With this they were to govern an enormous area with a population of about 10 million people.

The economic and administrative politics had the greatest effect on urbanization. The important export products cash crops (including cotton, maize, tobacco, sugar, coffee, tea, palm oil, and groundnuts) and minerals had to be transported to the harbour towns for export. For this railway transport was needed, and to run the colony administration and personnel was needed. The central administration was often placed in harbour town, but there was not developed any network of small and middle-sized cities (Aase, 2003:3).

New cities were placed in an existing settlement or at a completely new site. Completely new cities were especially developed in the copper zone to house the mine workers. Examples include Johannesburg and Kimberley in South Africa, Ndola and Kitwe in Zambia and Lubumbashi in DR Congo.

A strong centralised political system was also important in the development of early urban centres for example in the Ndebele Kingdom under Mzilikazi and later on Lobengula

Some cities were used and some were ignored. Close to the main lines of transportation the cities grew, while towns that were ignored by transportation and administration in effect disappeared, as for example Kukawa and Dahomey.

It was in the cities of transportation and administration that contact with government and commerce was possible. As a consequence it was invested in these cities leading to the need of workforce. The commercial politics of raw inputs exporting to finance the colony and develop Africa governed the way what cities that should grow.

At the same time the colonial powers became aware of the problems that urbanization brought with it. The rural-urban migration pulled labour away from the countryside where the important export products were made. The Africans usually lived in small spaces and under poor sanitary conditions. They were therefore prone to illnesses like malaria. One of the colonial governments' response was to separate Europeans, Asians and Africans from each other and establish influx control laws. In South Africa this resulted in the official policy of apartheid from 1950. This was also a policy that was especially common in settler cities like Harare, Lusaka and Nairobi.

With the Great Depression in the 1930s, prices of African export products dropped. This in turn led to an economic downturn and unemployment. The mining workforce before the depression had been mostly temporary or seasonal, often also forced labour. The workers therefore lived in mining cities away from home and their families in the countryside.

From the 1920s in Belgian Congo and from the 1940s in South Africa and South and North Rhodesia the mining companies started to prefer more permanent workers. The authorities changed their policies to facilitate the change, and after a while also moved the working men's families into the cities. The new policies tried to strengthen the authorities' control over land and city growth, and make life easier for the European administration.

The effect of the apartheid and similar policies can be illustrated by comparing urban growth rate in Southern Africa, with that of the rest of Africa in the 1950s. This also illustrates that the policy was not working or not effective in the other colonies: The urban growth rate of Southern Africa was about 3.3%, compared to about 4.6% for the whole of Africa.

As the economy grew, the cities also grew. The colonial authorities started to strengthen the development policies that had suffered because of the 1930s depression. Social services, especially primary schools, but also secondary schools, and in the end of the colonial period also a few universities were built. Important infrastructure such as harbours, electricity grid and roads was further developed. All this caused growing administration, growing exports and growing cities, that grew even more in the post colonial period.

World War II caused considerable urbanization and industrialization in the Union of South Africa and led to large numbers of non-whites migrating to cities to seek work in factories. This trend led to increasing dissent against the white minority's racial segregation policies and housing shortages, with many blacks barred from entering cities because of pass laws living in squatter camps such as Soweto. The ruling United Party under Jan Smuts issued the Fagan Report recommending easing of segregation as a solution to the tensions, while the opposition Herenigde Nasionale Party under J. B. M. Hertzog and D. F. Malan issued the Sauer Report recommending the opposite solution of intensified segregation. The HNP won the 1948 South African general election and subsequently implemented these policies as apartheid.

== Postcolonial period ==
Most of today's African countries gained their formal independence in the 1960s. The new countries seemed to have a great faith in planned economy regardless of how they gained their independence. The government should actively develop the country, not only by building infrastructure and developing social services; but also by developing industry and employment. Many parastatal companies are today left as 'white elephants' and demonstrate the great investments that were made in the cities at the beginning of the post-colonial period (Rakodi, 1997).

For many reasons it was thought that centralisation equalled a strong (powerful) state (government). The reasons could be

- the wish to induce a feeling of nationhood, which also led to the establishment of brand new capitals (to be mentioned later);
- a lack of qualified government officers; someone had to do the work that the colonial officers had done, but in some places these people simply did not exist;
- the fear that local authorities would turn against central authorities. (Rakodi, 1997).

Centralization meant that companies had even more reason to establish themselves in the already large capitals because this was closest to power. In effect this led to a huge concentration of investment in urban areas. For example, in Nigeria where 80% of investments not related to agriculture was spent in urban areas (Rakodi, 1997).

New cities were also established in the post-colonial period, but not for the same reasons as in the colonial period. The seaport Tema in Ghana was built awaiting great industrial growth. Later, new capitals were built, inspired by the planned city of Brasília in Brazil. This happened in Malawi (Lilongwe), Côte d'Ivoire (Yamoussoukro) and Nigeria (Abuja) (Stock, 1995). The new capitals were meant to give the nation a 'fresh start', they were supposed to be the beginning of a new golden future promised by the liberation politicians.

As none of the new capitals have grown to more than about half a million inhabitants, they have probably not had much influence on the growth of the already established cities. Tema could be said to be a success as it is the most important port today, and together with Accra represent the biggest metropolitan area in Ghana (The World Bank Group, 2001; UN, 2003b; Obeng-Odoom, 2013).

At the same time as influx-control regulations were intensified in South Africa, this kind of regulation was weakened in the newly liberated countries. This led to more rural-urban migration in the newly liberated countries (Rakodi, 1997), and a stable decline in urbanization growth from 1950 to 1990 in South Africa. From figure 1 one can see that after the end of apartheid in 1990, the urbanization rate grow from 2.29% to 3.41%, while it continues to sink in the rest of Africa. The abandonment of the influx-control regulations in 1986 is a part of this picture. The city of Bloemfontein grew 51% between 1988 and 1996. (The Ministry of the Flemish Government, 2001).

| Country / Region | 1950–1955 | 1955–1960 | 1960–1965 | 1965–1970 | 1970–1975 | 1975–1980 | 1980–1985 | 1985–1990 | 1990–1995 | 1995–2000 | 2000–2005 |
|---|---|---|---|---|---|---|---|---|---|---|---|
| Africa | 4.50 | 4.63 | 4.85 | 4.68 | 4.37 | 4.45 | 4.38 | 4.26 | 4.16 | 3.91 | 3.76 |
| Eastern Africa | 5.57 | 5.77 | 6.08 | 6.07 | 6.28 | 6.56 | 5.36 | 5.56 | 5.31 | 5.10 | 4.70 |
| Southern Africa | 3.21 | 3.32 | 3.00 | 3.03 | 2.82 | 2.64 | 2.73 | 2.63 | 3.50 | 3.15 | 2.13 |
| South Africa | 3.14 | 3.23 | 2.88 | 2.90 | 2.66 | 2.46 | 2.49 | 2.29 | 3.41 | 3.13 | 2.09 |
Figure 1: Average yearly urbanization growth as %. From: World Urbanization Prospects: The 2001 Revision, FN 2002. Eastern Africa is included because it is the region with the most urbanization growth after 1950. All numbers are estimated, and especially the ones for 2000–2005 are therefore uncertain

Influx control regulation was active in South Africa until 1986–90, while in the rest of Africa they were more or less abandoned or without effect. However, even the remnants of these regulations could have an effect on how the cities grew, since they made it difficult to get hold of legally owned land. This again led to the illegitimate occupation of land.

One reason for people wanting to move from rural to urban areas is that they think living will be better there. A comparison between HDI rank and urbanization level in Africa could show that there might be some sense in this belief. The five African countries that in 2001 ranked highest on the United Nations Human Development Index was also some of the most urbanised, see figure 2.

| Country | HDI value | % urban population |
|---|---|---|
| Libya | 0.783 | 88.0 |
| Tunisia | 0.740 | 66.2 |
| Algeria | 0.704 | 57.7 |
| South Africa | 0.684 | 57.7 |
| Equatorial Guinea | 0.664 | 49.3 |
Figure 2: Numbers from UNDP, 2003: "Human Development Index" and the UN "World Urbanization Prospects, the 2001 Revision“. The HDI value is calculated from each countries education level, life expectancy at birth and GDP per capita (PPP US$). The countries are ranked by HDI value.

In some countries rural inhabitants have been given even more reasons to migrate to the city by lower food prices in the cities, often because of pressure from trade unions. This in turn has led to lowered income in rural areas and therefore higher migration to urban areas. (Rakodi, 1997; Aase, 2003).

Finally it should be mentioned that war and economic misconduct have led to the dilution of rural resources and periodically very high rural-urban migration. At the end of the 1980s, there were only 18 African countries that had not experienced a military coup against their government (Rakodi, 1997).(Written by Josiah Naidoo).

== Summary ==
The urbanization rate in Africa is slowing, but so is the population growth rate, much because of HIV/AIDS (UN, 2003a). The big cities of Africa will probably continue to grow, but the future is as always uncertain. In 1994 it was expected that Lagos would become the world's third biggest city with 24.4 million inhabitants by 2015 (Todaro, 1997), but in 2001 this was adjusted to the world's eleventh biggest city with 'only' 16 million inhabitants (UN, 2002). This shows how uncertain the numbers are, and how unpredictable the African population development is.

It is evident that like in the rest of the world, the African urbanization process has mainly been influenced by economy. The colonial powers placed ports, railways and mines to economically strategic places. The cities have both in colonial and post-colonial times been economically prioritized. People came to these places for nationalistic pride, work, administration, education and social services. The exception is South Africa who, with its strict influx control regime and apartheid policy, to a certain degree managed to control urban growth. It is nonetheless one of the most urbanized countries of Africa and now has a low urbanization growth.

== See also ==
- Category:Timelines of cities in Africa
- Lists of cities in Africa
- List of metropolitan areas in Africa
- Urban planning in Africa

== Bibliography ==
- Koreisha, Sergio: Brasília and the Central West.

1990s

- Stock, Robert. 1995: Africa South of the Sahara ? A Geographical Interpretation. The Guilford Press, New York.
- Aryeetey-Attoh, S. 1997: Urban Geography of Sub-Saharan Africa, in Aryeetey-Attoh, S.: Geography of Sub-Saharan Africa, Prentice Hall, 1997, page 182–186.
- Rakodi, Carole 1997: The Urban Challenge in Africa: Growth and Management of Its Large Cities Archived 2008-02-18 at the Wayback Machine. New York United Nations University, Tokyo.
- Todaro, Michael P. 1997: Urbanization, Unemployment, and Migration in Africa: Theory and Policy.
- Dorsey, L. 1998: History 485/885. Africa Since 1800. University of Nebraska.

2000s

- The Ministry of the Flemish Government, Department of Education 2001: South Africa: Spatial transformation in the post-apartheid era. A website course in social economic and political geography, and international educational project.
- The World Bank Group 2001: Upgrading of Low Income Settlements Country Assessment Report: Ghana Archived 2004-06-23 at the Wayback Machine.
- United Nations (UN), Population Division 2003a: World Population Prospects, the 2002 Revision. Highlights. New York.
- United Nations (UN), Population Division 2002: World Urbanization Prospects, the 2001 Revision. New York.
- Hernæs, Per 2003a: Kolonistyret i Africa ? del I. NTNU, Trondheim. Paper only available within the university.
- Hernæs, Per 2003b: Kolonistyret i Africa ? del II. NTNU, Trondheim. Paper only available within the university.
- The Intelligencer, 2003: Terrible risk to ignore urban slums. Belleville.
- Areal, Augusto Cesar Baptista 2003: The City of Brasília. General Information about Brasília.
- UNDP 2003: Human Development Indicators 2003.
- United Nations (UN), Statistics Division 2003b: Population of capital cities and cities of 100,000 and more inhabitants. New York.
- Aase, Asbjørn 2003: Urbanisering og byliv i Africa. NTNU, Trondheim. Paper only available within the university.

2010s

- Elizabeth Heath (2010). "Urbanism and Urbanization in Africa". In Kwame Anthony Appiah; Henry Louis Gates (eds.). Encyclopedia of Africa. Oxford University Press. ISBN 9780195337709.
- Obeng-Odoom F, 2013, Governance for Pro-Poor Urban Development: Lessons from Ghana, Routledge, London.
- The State of African Cities 2014. United Nations Human Settlements Programme. 2014. ISBN 978-92-1-132598-0.
- Somik Vinay Lall; Vernon Henderson; Anthony J. Venables (2017). Africa's Cities: Opening Doors to the World. World Bank Group. hdl:10986/25896. ISBN 978-1-4648-1044-2.
- United Nations Economic Commission for Africa (2017), Economic Report on Africa 2017: Urbanization and Industrialization for Africa's Transformation, Addis Ababa, ISBN 978-92-1-125127-2, archived from the original on 2017-10-25
