= Zota District =

Subdivision of Bong County, Liberia

Coordinates: 6°59′20″N 9°34′53″W

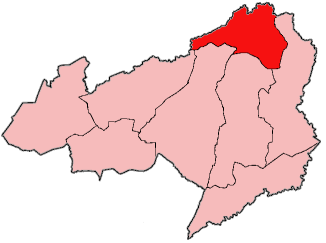
- Zota District in Bong County

Zota District is one of twelve districts located in Bong County, Liberia.It has four third level subdivisions Upper Kpaquelleh, Zota, Lower Kpaquelleh, and Gwilapolu.

== Settlements ==
Settlements in Zota District include:

- Belefuanai
- Belifine
- Bonia
- Bunga
- Gannyou
- Gawata
