= Belefuanai =

Town in Bong county, Liberia

- Location in Liberia
- Coordinates: 7°15′36″N 9°26′7″W
- Country: Liberia
- County: Bong County
- Climate: Am

Belefuanai is a town in Zota District of Bong County, Liberia, near the border of Guinea. it is located near the

Nearby towns and villages include Gawata (3.4 km), Belifine (1.2 km), Bunga (1.0 km), Gannyou (4.5 km) and Bonia (2.1 km).
