= Urban areas in Africa by population =

This is a list of the largest urban agglomerations in Africa. Figures are from the United Nations World Urbanization Prospects report, as well as from citypopulation.de. Figures for administrative areas are also given.

== List ==
Urban area	Country	Administrative area according to local national census authorities	Urban agglomerations United Nations - 2020	Urban agglomerations citypopulation.de - 2026	Image
Cairo	Egypt	10,044,894 (2022); Governorate	20,901,000	23,200,000	
Lagos	Nigeria	13,400,000 (2007)	14,368,000	21,900,000	
Kinshasa	Democratic Republic of the Congo	16,316,000 (2023); Province (Kinshasa)	14,342,000	16,900,000	
Johannesburg	South Africa	4,772,846 (2022)	5,783,000	15,100,000	
Luanda	Angola	9,079,811 (2022); Provincia	8,330,000	10,400,000	
Khartoum-Omdurman	Sudan	4,272,728 (2008); 3 principal cities of the Khartoum agglomeration	5,829,000	7,400,000	
Abidjan	Ivory Coast	6,321,017 (2021); District	5,203,000	7,300,000	
Nairobi	Kenya	4,750,056 (2022); Nairobi County	6,547,547	7,150,000	
Accra	Ghana	284,124 (2021); District (Accra Metropolitan District)	2,514,000	7,050,000	
Dar es Salaam	Tanzania	5,383,728 (2022) Region	6,702,000	6,900,000	
Alexandria	Egypt	5,441,866 (2021); Governorate	5,281,000	6,350,000	
Kano	Nigeria	9,401,288 (2006) 16,253,549 (2023)	3,999,000	5,550,000	
Casablanca	Morocco	3,642,656 (2023) Préfecture	3,752,000	4,500,000	
Addis Ababa	Ethiopia	3,859,999 (2022); Astedader	4,794,000	4,950,000	
Cape Town	South Africa	4,772,846 (2022); Metropolitan municipality	4,618,000	5,200,000	
Dakar	Senegal	3,896,564 (2022); Région	3,140,000	4,375,000	
Algiers	Algeria	2,988,145 (2008); Wilaya	2,768,000	4,400,000	
Abuja	Nigeria	3,067,500 (2022); Federal capital territory	3,278,000	3,175,000	
Pretoria	South Africa	4,040,315 (2022); Metropolitan municipality	2,566,000	see Greater Johannesburg	
Bamako	Mali	4,227,569 (2022); Capital district	2,618,000	5,950,000	
Kampala	Uganda	1,680,600 (2020); District	3,298,000	5,350,000	
Ibadan	Nigeria	2,559,853	3,552,000	3,475,000	
Douala	Cameroon	2,768,400 (2015); Municipality	3,663,000	3,950,000	
Durban	South Africa	4,678,127 (2022); Metropolitan municipality	4,130,000	3,975,000	
Antananarivo	Madagascar	1,274,225 (2018); Municipality	3,369,000	3,250,000	
Kumasi	Ghana	443,981 (2022); District (Kumasi Metropolitan)	3,348,000	2,950,000	
Ouagadougou	Burkina Faso	2,415,266 (2019); Municipality	2,780,000	3,550,000	
Tunis	Tunisia	1,075,837 (2022); Governorate	2,365,000	2,775,000	
Conakry	Guinea	1,660,973 (2014); Région	1,938,000	4,000,000	
Lubumbashi	Democratic Republic of the Congo		2,478,000	2,975,000	
Port Harcourt	Nigeria	541,116 (2006); Local government area	3,020,000	2,300,000	
Harare	Zimbabwe	2,427,231 (2022); Province	1,530,000	2,700,000	
Maputo	Mozambique	1,080,277 (2017); Province-level city	1,110,000	2,650,000	
Mbuji-Mayi	Democratic Republic of the Congo		2,525,000	2,600,000	
Lusaka	Zambia	2,204,059 (2022); District	2,774,000	3,100,000	
Brazzaville	Republic of the Congo	2,145,783 (2023); Capital district (Brazzaville)	2,388,000	2,550,000	
Mogadishu	Somalia	3,000,000 (2011)	2,282,000	2,325,000	
Rabat	Morocco	512,403 (2023); Préfecture	1,885,000	2,150,000	
Kaduna	Nigeria	760,084 (2006); 2 local government areas of Kaduna	1,113,000	2,025,000	
Ndjamena	Chad	1,521,900 (2019); Capital district	1,423,000	2,025,000	
Benin City	Nigeria		1,727,000	1,840,000	
Monrovia	Liberia	1,010,970 (2008); Municipality	1,517,000	2,000,000	
Tripoli	Libya	1,126,000 (2006); Mutsarfiyah	1,165,000	1,930,000	
Oran	Algeria		899,000	1,670,000	
Bangui	Central African Republic		889,000	1,740,000	
Niamey	Niger	1,324,700 (2020); Capital district	1,292,000	1,580,000	
Nouakchott	Mauritania		1,315,000	1,550,000	
Freetown	Sierra Leone	1,055,964 (2015); Western Area province	1,202,000	1,460,000	
Maiduguri	Nigeria		786,000	1,220,000	
Kigali	Rwanda	1,745,555 (2022); Province	1,132,000	2,050,000	
Fez	Morocco	1,296,772 (2023); Préfecture	1,224,000	1,330,000	
Mombasa	Kenya	1,208,333 (2019); Municipality	1,296,000	1,400,000	
Onitsha	Nigeria		1,415,000	1,250,000	
Kananga	Democratic Republic of the Congo		1,458,000	1,420,000	
Agadir	Morocco		924,000	1,300,000	
Kisangani	Democratic Republic of the Congo		1,261,000	1,340,000	
Marrakesh	Morocco	1,330,468 (2023); Préfecture	1,003,000	1,150,000	
Pointe-Noire	Republic of the Congo		1,214,000	1,530,000	
Bujumbura	Burundi	1,126,930 (2019)	1,013,000	1,320,000	
Vereeniging	South Africa	800,819 (2007); District municipality	774,000	see Greater Johannesburg	
Huambo	Angola		671,000	Not listed	
Hargeisa	Somalia (Somaliland)		not listed	not listed	
Bosaso	Somalia		not listed	not listed	

== See also ==
- Lists of cities in Africa, mostly by country
- List of cities in Africa by population
