= Sanniquellie-Mahn District =

Coordinates: 7°21′44″N 8°42′22″W

Sanniquellie-Mah District is one of 17 districts of Nimba County, Liberia. As of 2008, the population was 25,370. Its capital lies at Sanniquellie.
