= Sanayea District =

Coordinates: 7.029°N 9.950°W

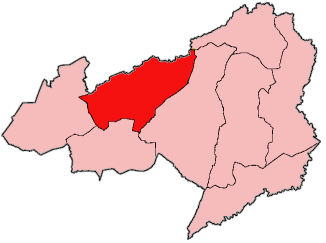
Location of Sanayea District in Bong County

Sanayea District (or Sanoyeah) is one of twelve districts located in Bong County, Liberia. It has six third level sub-divisions: Menquelleh, Wallahun, Deingmah, Boryermah, Sanoyea, and Bonkomu. It had a population of 30,300 people in the 2008 Census.
