= Bong County =

County of Liberia

- County
- Flag

- Location in Liberia
- Coordinates: 07°00′00″N 09°40′00″W
- Country: Liberia
- Capital: Gbarnga
- Districts: 12
- Established: 1964

Government
  - Superintendent: Hawa Loleyah Norris

Area
  - Total: 8,754 km^{2} (3,380 sq mi)

Population (2022 census)
  - Total: 467,502
  - Density: 53.40/km^{2} (138.3/sq mi)
- Time zone: UTC+0 (GMT)
- ISO 3166 code: LR-BG
- HDI (2021): 0.434 low · 9th of 15

Bong is a county in the north-central portion of the West African nation of Liberia. One of 15 counties that comprise the first-level of administrative division in the nation, it has twelve districts. Gbarnga serves as the capital. The area of the county measures 8,772 square kilometres (3,387 mi^{2}). As of the 2022 Census, it had a population of 467,502, making it the third-most populous county in Liberia. The county was organized in 1964 and is important for its mining industry. Bong produces mostly iron ore, for example at the Bong Mine, located in Bong Town.

Named after Mount Bong in the southern portion of the county, it is bordered by Lofa and Gbarpolu counties to the north, Margibi and Montserrado counties to the west, Grand Bassa County to the south, and Nimba County to the east. The northeast part of Bong borders the nation of Guinea. Bong County's flag is purple, signifying the dawn, and orange, signifying the county's newness. The two geological instruments in the white field portion of the flag symbolize Bong County's mining industry.

== Geography ==
Bong County is situated in the central part of Liberia. The main paved road that runs from Monrovia to Sanniquellie in Nimba County traverses Bong County.

== Districts ==
Bong County has twelve districts (2008 population):

- Boinsen District (8,352)
- Fuamah District (27,784)
- Jorquelleh District (78,803)
- Kokoyah District (3,707)
- Kpaai District (25,127)
- Panta District (16,326)
- Salala District (41,982)
- Sanayea District (30,932)
- Suakoko District (28,277)
- Tukpahblee District (11,767)
- Yeallequellah District (36,919)
- Zota District (18,943)

== Demographics ==
The population of Bong from the 1984 Census was 255,813 for the 8,772 square kilometres (3,387 mi^{2}) county. In July 2005, the population was estimated to be around 804,000. In 2008, the Census placed the figure at 328,919, ranking it third in Liberia after Montserrado and Nimba. The main ethnic groups include the Kpelle, Mandingo (who are mostly Muslim), and Mano.

== Education ==
1. Cuttington University is a private institution established in the late 19th century by the Episcopal Church of the US as part of its educational mission in Liberia. It is located in Suacoco.

2. United Methodist University (UMU) is a private institution of higher learning in Monrovia. It was established in 1998 and opened in 2000.

3. Bong Technical College.

== Politics ==
Bong County is represented in the Senate by Senators. Henrique Tokpa, the former Cuttington University President, and also the former Minister of Internal Affairs, was senator in 2018. Current senator (2023) is Johnny K. Kpehe.

== History ==
Bong County was created in 1964, along with Nimba, Lofa and Grand Gedeh, when the administrative sub-divisions of Liberia were increased to a total of thirteen. The capital is Gbarnga, named after an old farm in the location. Gbarnga was used by Charles Taylor as the base for his rebellion against the Presidency of Samuel Doe in the early 1990s. Having failed to capture Monrovia, in early 1991, he established an unofficial provisional government (the (National Patriotic Reconstruction Assembly Government, or NPRAG) after ECOMOG forces arrived for peacekeeping and were based in the Liberian capital. NPRAG continued to operate out of Gbarnga until 1994.

== Superintendents ==
- 1964 - 1968 James Y. Gbarbea
- 1968 - 1971 Augustus W. Korwaya (Korkoryah)
- 1971 - 1976 Harry Augustus Greaves
- 1976 - 1980 Joseph A. (Kolleh) Yorwatei (Yorwatel)
- 1980 - 1983 Bardeh B. Zaza
- 1983 Ayun Cassell
- 1983 - 1990 Venecious K. Vorkpor
- 1990 - 1994 John Nanjohn Suah
- 1994 - 1995 Charles K. Too (acting)
- 1995 - 1997 George S. Mulbah
- 1997 A. Wonyon Kulah
- 1997 - 2002 J. Fulton Dunbar
- 2002 - 2004 Aloysius Sackie
- Aug 2004 - 2006 Daniel F. Weetol
- 2006 - 28 Jan 2011 Ranney Banama Jackson, Sr. (suspended Oct 2008 - Dec 2009)
- 2008 - 2009 Dan Hartzman
- 28 Jan 2011 - 2012 Lucia F. Herbert (acting to 17 Mar 2011)
- Apr 2012 - 2018 Selena Polson Mappy (suspended in Dec 2015, reinstated in May 2016)
- 2018 - 2024(?) Esther Y. Walker
- 2024 Hawa Loleyah Norris

After the 1980 coup d'état, J. Fulton Dunbar Sr, the Superintendent of Nimba County, reportedly fled to his farm near Palala in Bong County. He and Bong County Superintendent Yorwatei reportedly subsequently surrendered together. Yorwatei had previously been Private Secretary to President Tolbert, who was ousted by the coup and murdered. Yorwatei was a member of the True Whig Party and reportedly continued to support Tolbert after he became Superintendent of Bong County. His wife Frances, her mother Louise Rose and her sister Majorie King were also arrested and detained shortly after the coup.

== See also ==
- 2014 Ebola virus epidemic in Liberia
