= Barclayville =

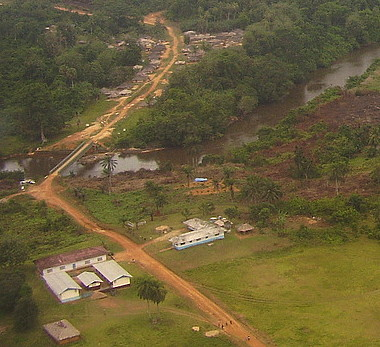
- View from Catholic and Evangelical compounds at the edge of Wakpeken looking towards Topor

- Location in Liberia
- Coordinates: 4°40′47″N 8°14′2″W
- Country: Liberia
- County: Grand Kru County

Population (2008)
  - Total: 2,733
- Climate: Af

Barclayville is the capital and most populous settlement in Grand Kru County, located in southeastern Liberia about 10 miles inland from Picinicess. As of the 2008 national census, the population stood at 2,733. The Barclayville township straddles the banks of the Na River. Roads from Kanweaken to the northwest, Pleebo to the southeast, and to Picinicess and Grand Cess to the southeast, all intersect at Barclayville.

In March 2006, the United Nations reported completion of the Na River bridge at Barclayville, connecting the Kanweaken and Pleebo roads for the first time.

== History ==
The modern jurisdiction of Barclayville was created by the administration of President Edwin Barclay in response to the last Kru Wars in the 1930s. As part of the effort to exert central government authority and diminish intertribal conflicts, which had produced devastation, he had four separate villages combined into one township. Until the creation of Barclayville, the constituent villages of Seetor and Kayken, which are occupied by rival chiefdoms, were in periodic conflict. The villages of Seetor, Kayeken and Wakpeken and their "suburbs" are on the northwest side of the Na river, while Topor is on the opposite south bank across from Wakpekan.

Despite the town's large size, most structures are traditional mud-and-stick homes. As of the mid-1980s, when the township was organized, few had running water or electricity. Kplio (a dialect of Grebo) is the primary language of the residents, but English is the official language of instruction in the schools.

The regional high school is in Barclayville, along with several public and private (Christian) schools for grades K-8. Many Christian religious denominations have churches and/or missions in Barclayville including Catholic, Methodist, Baptist, and a variety of other evangelical congregations. Most of population also follows local animist practices.

Before the Liberian Civil War, much of the male adult population were on government payroll employed as teachers, employees of the courts, or serving as government officials or civil service staff. Upland rice farming is the primary occupation of most adults.

Each village lays claim to large areas of communal land that extend several miles inland from the town. They carry out slash and burn farming, rotating to a new section of land every year in order to allow the soil to recover its fertility. Because of the distance from the villages to these outlying farms, it is common for the women and younger children to live on the farms during the growing season. There the women also establish vegetable gardens and plant cassava. Farming within Barclayville is limited as crops serve as fodder for the freely roaming livestock and fowl, including cows, sheep, goats, and chickens.

In June 2005, the UN Integrated Regional Information Regional Network reported that the roads leading to Barclayville had decayed during the years of civil war and become overgrown by dense bush. They were impassable except by foot.

== See also ==
- Barclayville Grebo – Kru language of Liberia
