= List of cities in Madeira =

The following is a list of the largest cities/towns of Madeira. Funchal is the only city with a population over 100,000.

== Madeira Island ==
- Calheta
- Câmara de Lobos
- Funchal (capital of Madeira and the island's most populous city)
- Machico
- Porto da Cruz
- Ponta Delgada, São Vicente
- Ponta do Sol
- Porto Moniz
- Ribeira Brava
- Santa Cruz
- Santana
- São Vicente
- Seixal (Porto Moniz)

== Porto Santo Island ==
- Porto Santo
