= Pleebo =

- City
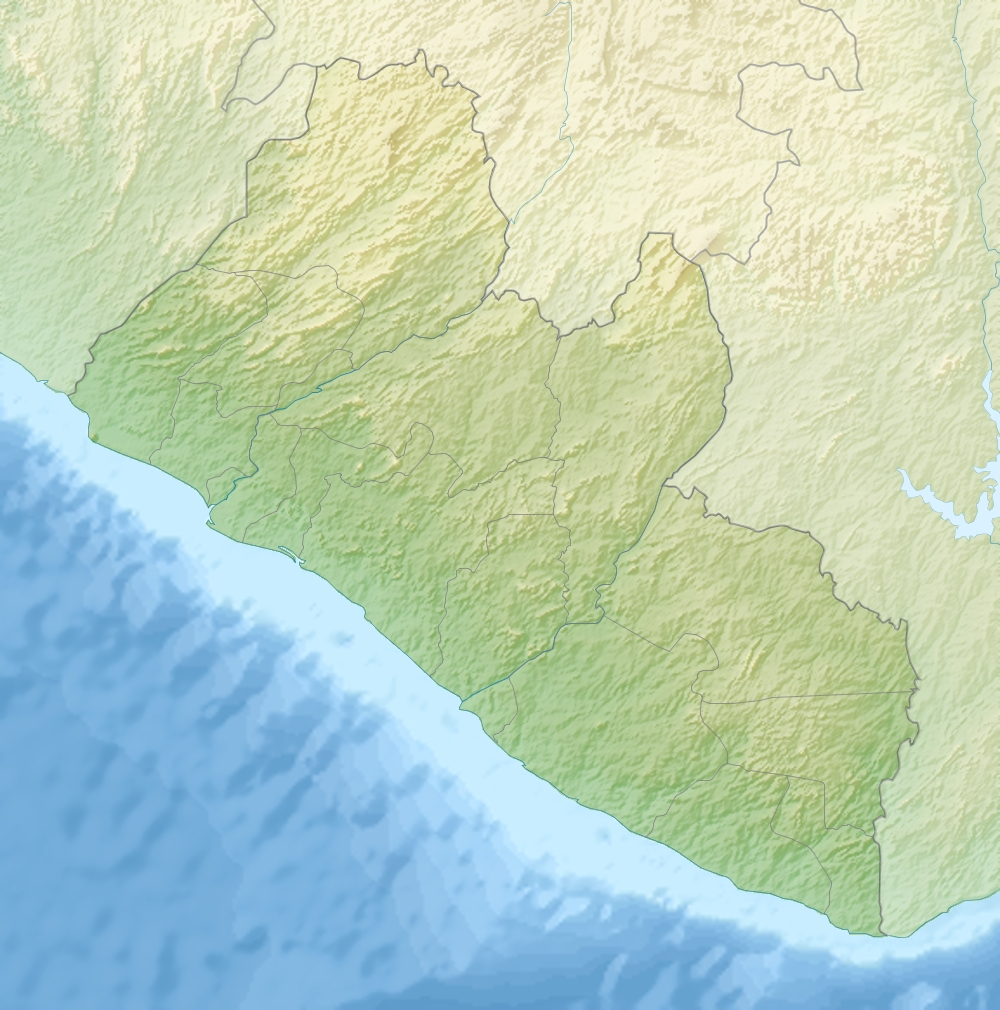
- Location in Liberia
- Coordinates: 4°35′21″N 7°40′23″W
- Country: Liberia
- County: Maryland County
- Elevation: 191 ft (58 m)
- Time zone: UTC+00:00 (GMT)

Pleebo (or Plibo) is a city located in Maryland County, Liberia. It is the largest city in Maryland County with a population of 22,693 in 2008.
