= List of cities in Africa by population =

Cairo, Egypt is the largest metropolis in Africa, the Middle East and the Arab world.

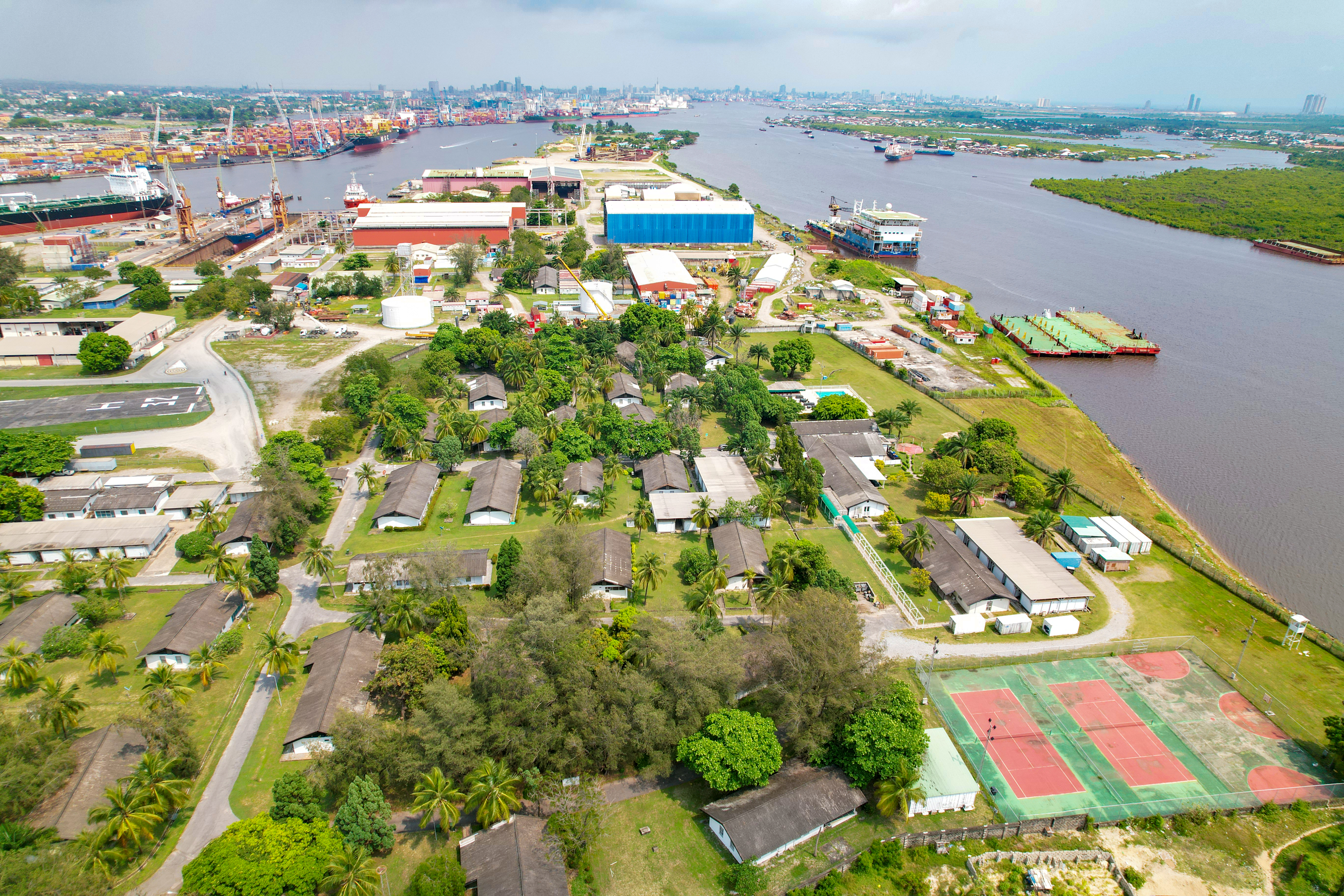
Lagos, Nigeria is one of the primary economic and logistical turntables in West Africa.

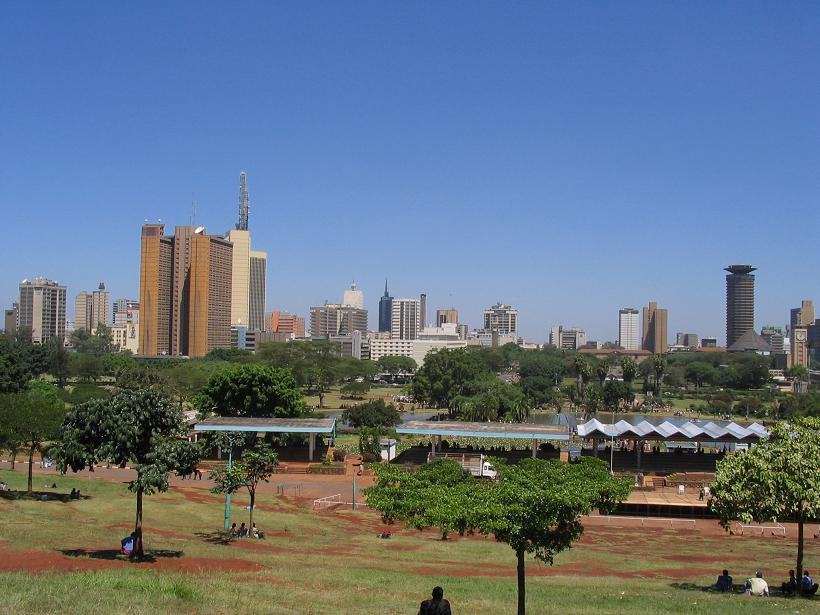
East Africa's central place of business and Kenya's capital, Nairobi.

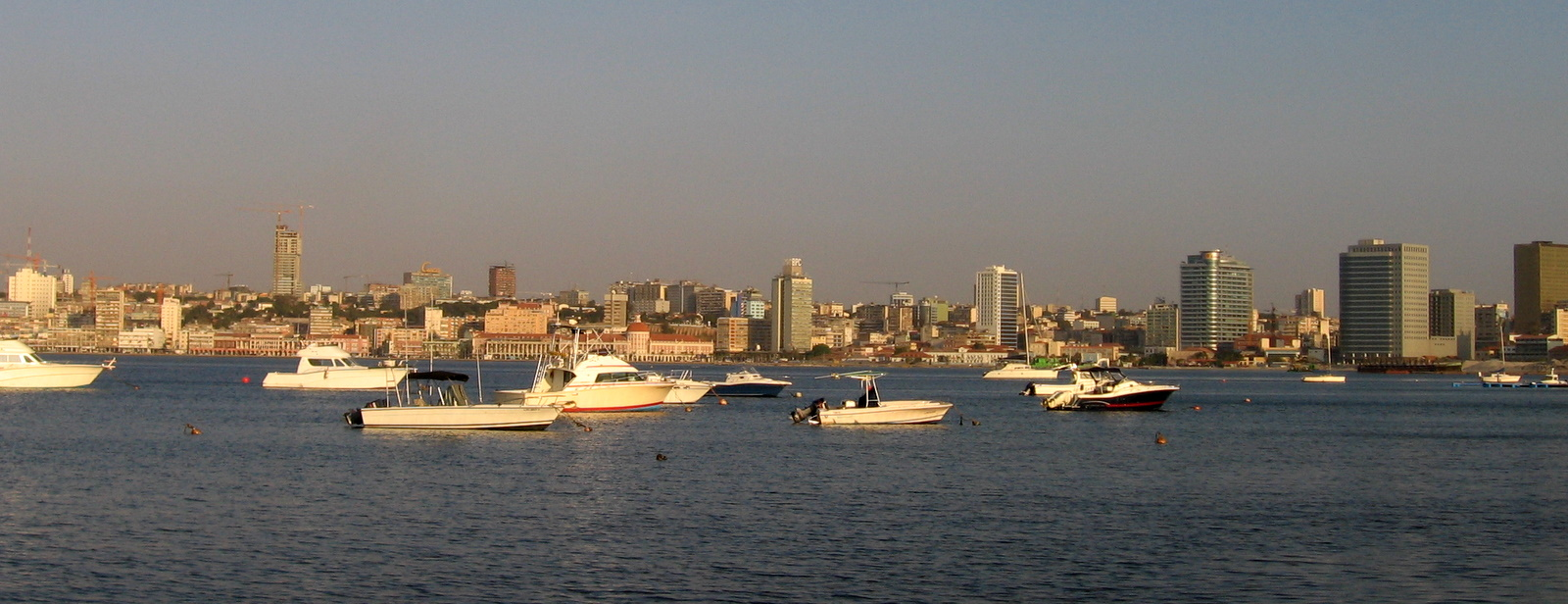
Oceanside of Luanda, the Angolan metropolis.

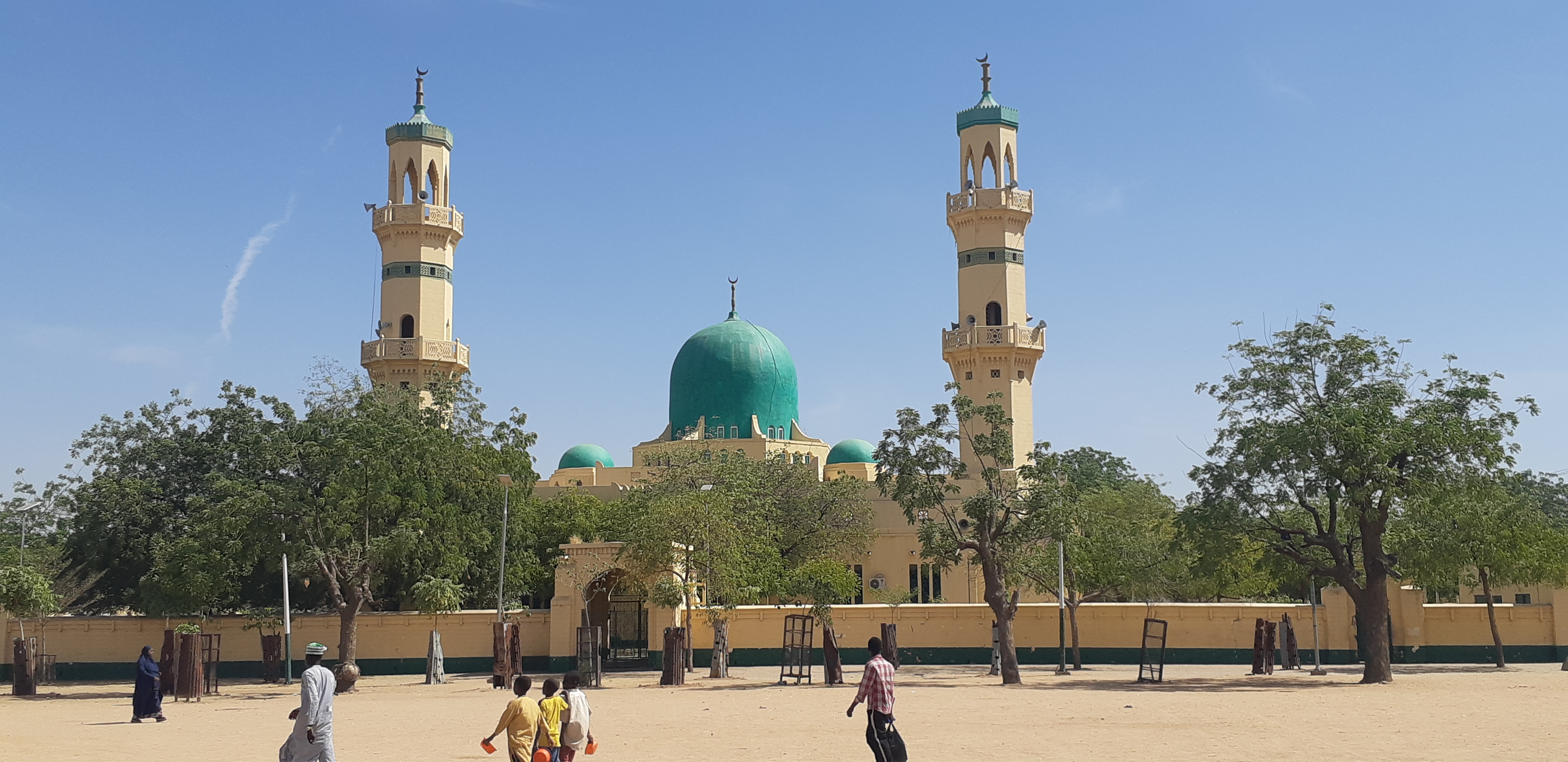
Great Mosque in the city of Kano, the historical centre and trans-Saharan trade focus in Northern Nigeria.

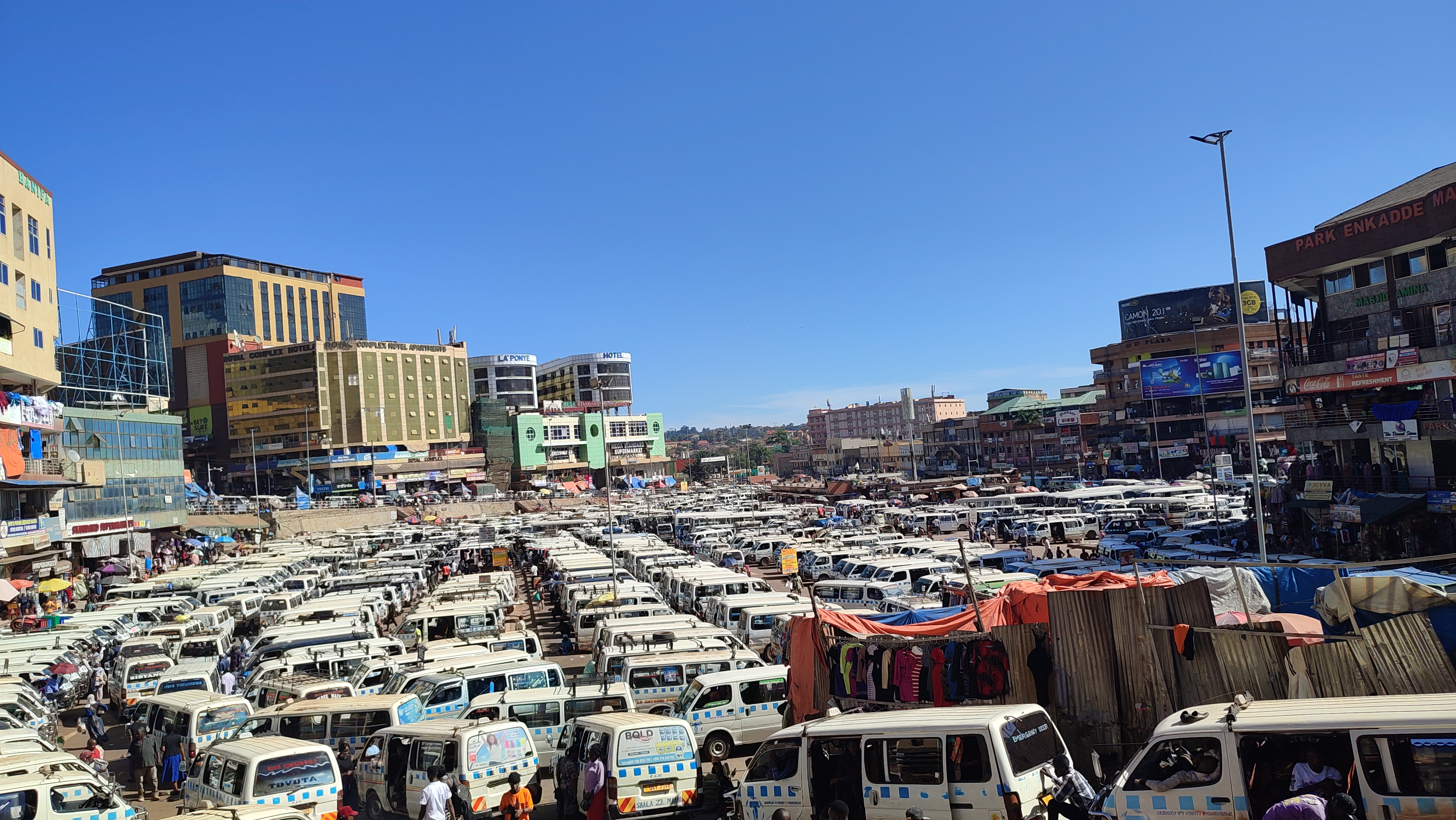
Kampala is the hub of Uganda.

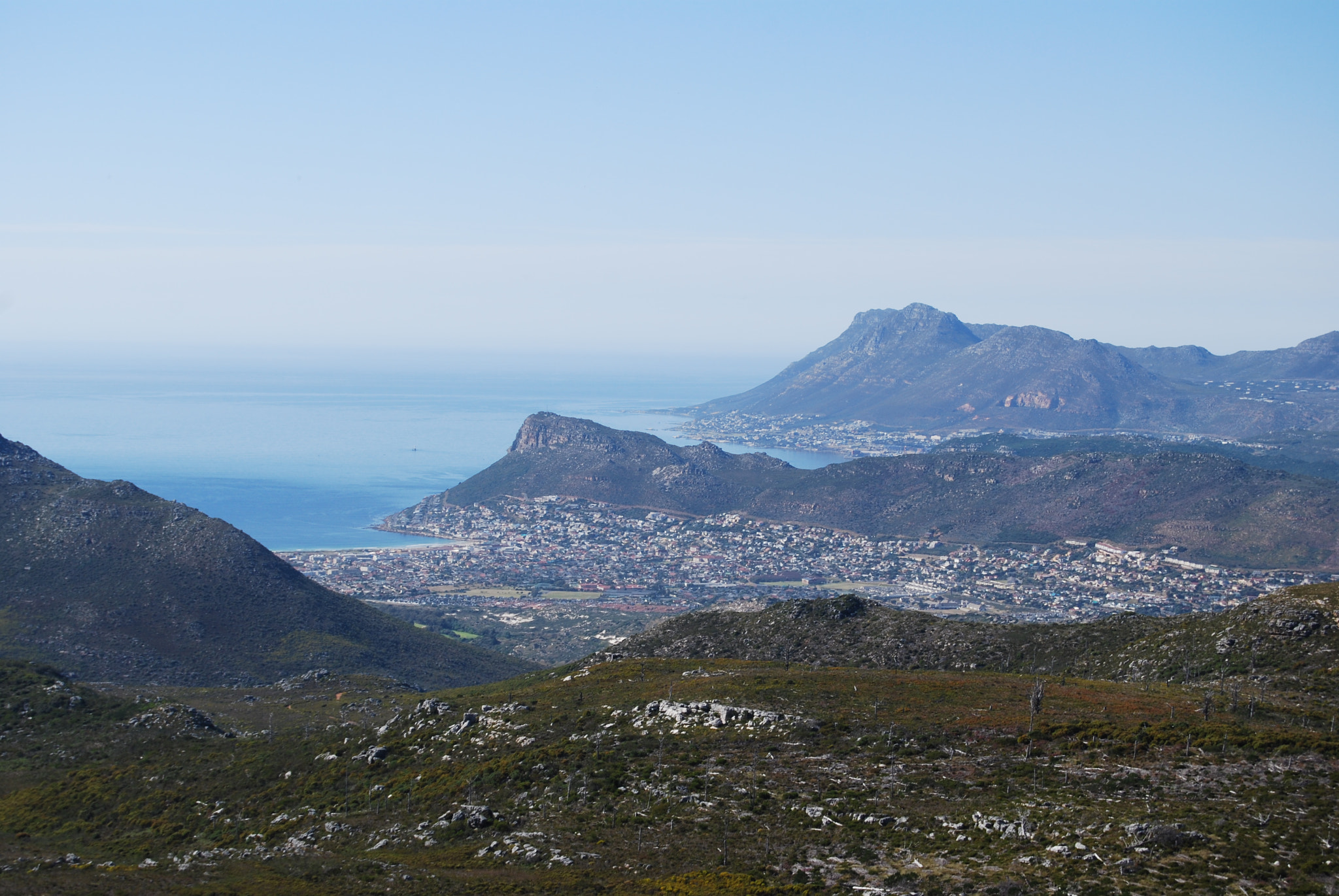
Cape Peninsula of Cape Town, Africa's southernmost city and the second largest one in South Africa, also its legislative capital.

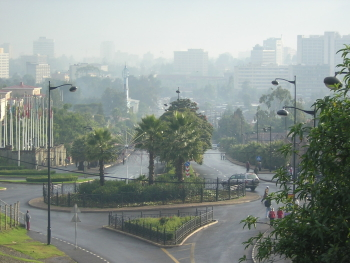
Addis Ababa is the core of Ethiopia and seat of the African Union.

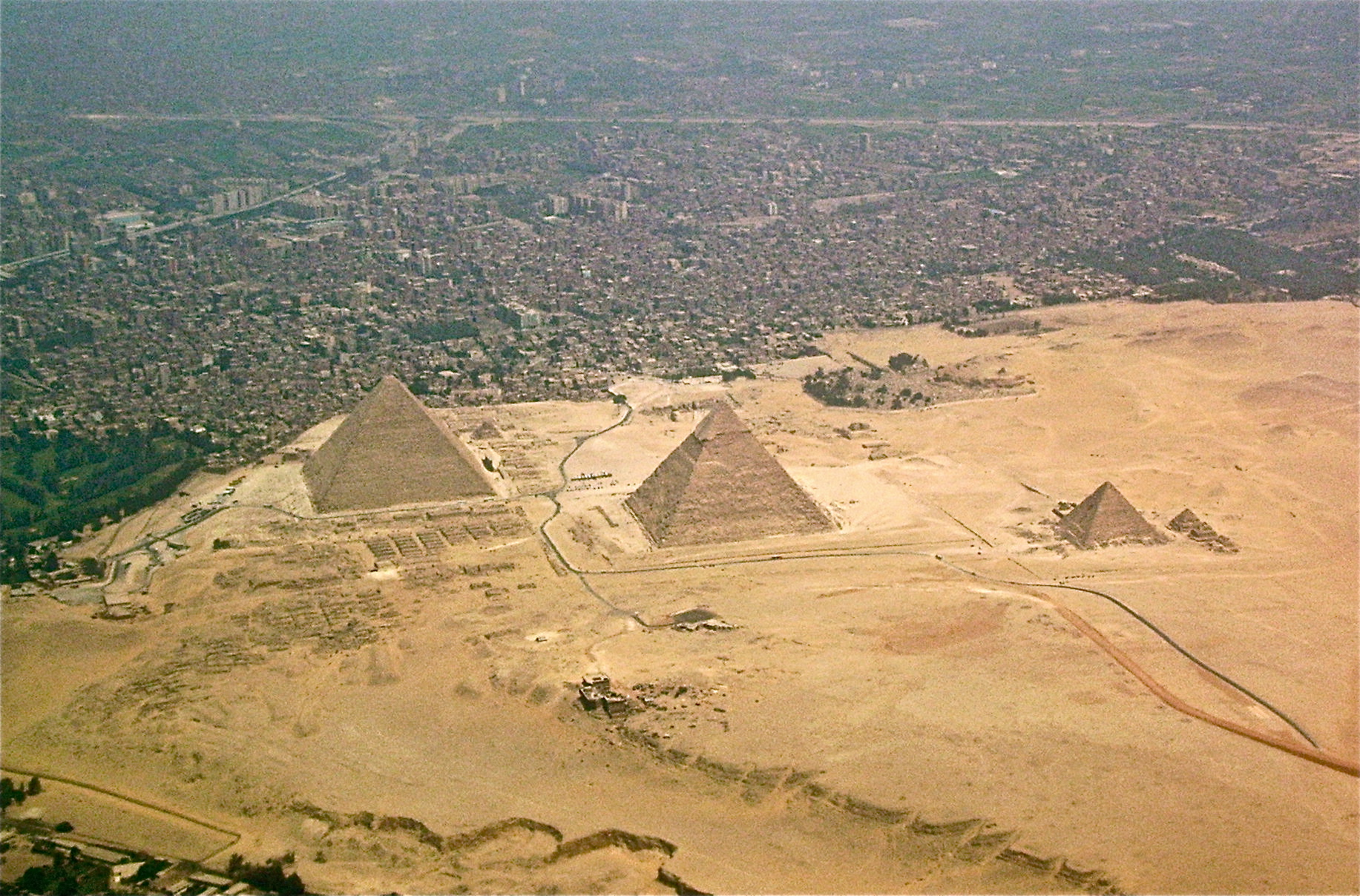
Aerial view of the pyramid complex and the city of Giza, Egypt, forming part of the Cairo agglomeration.

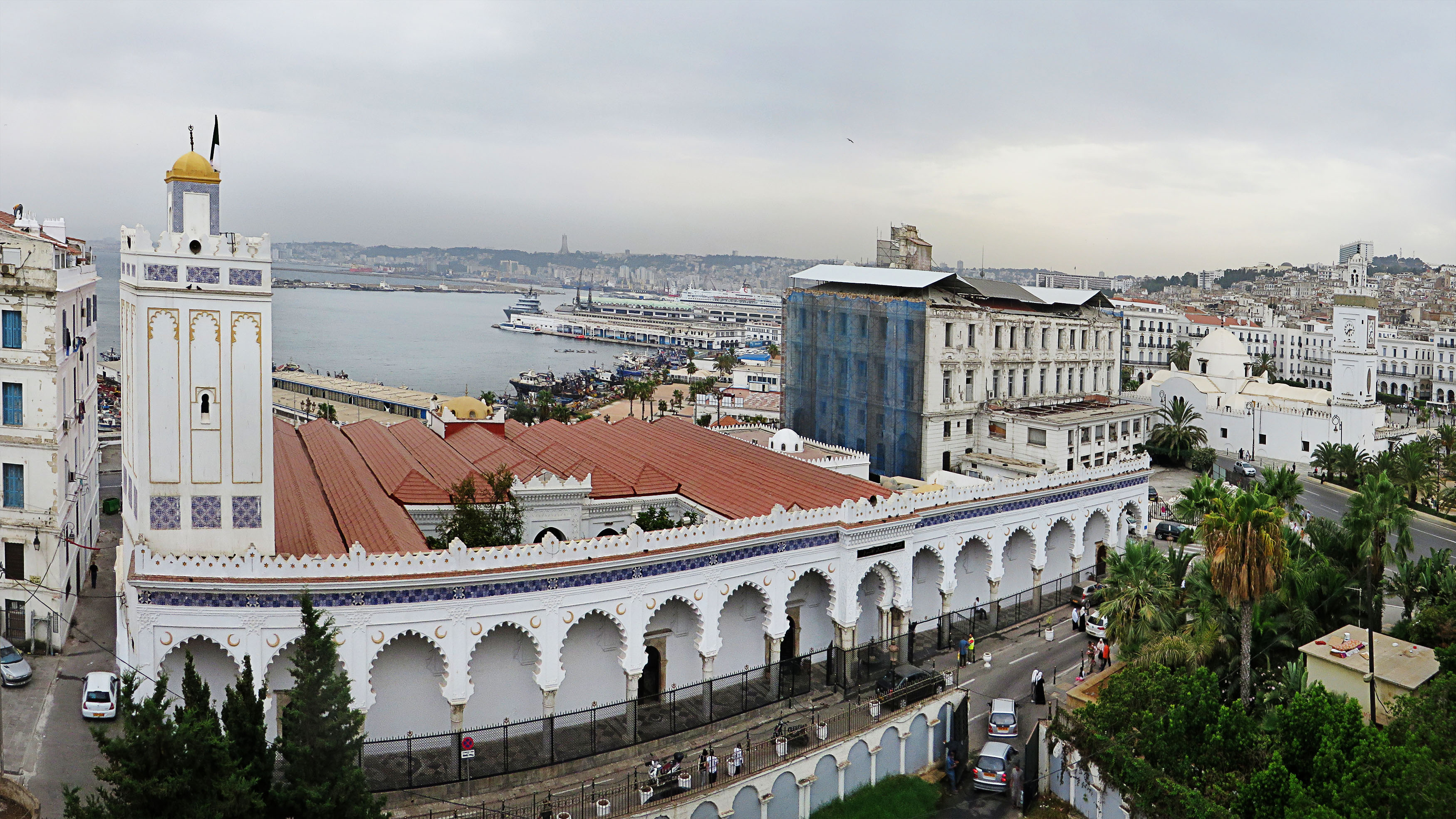
Downtown Algiers: Algeria's centre.

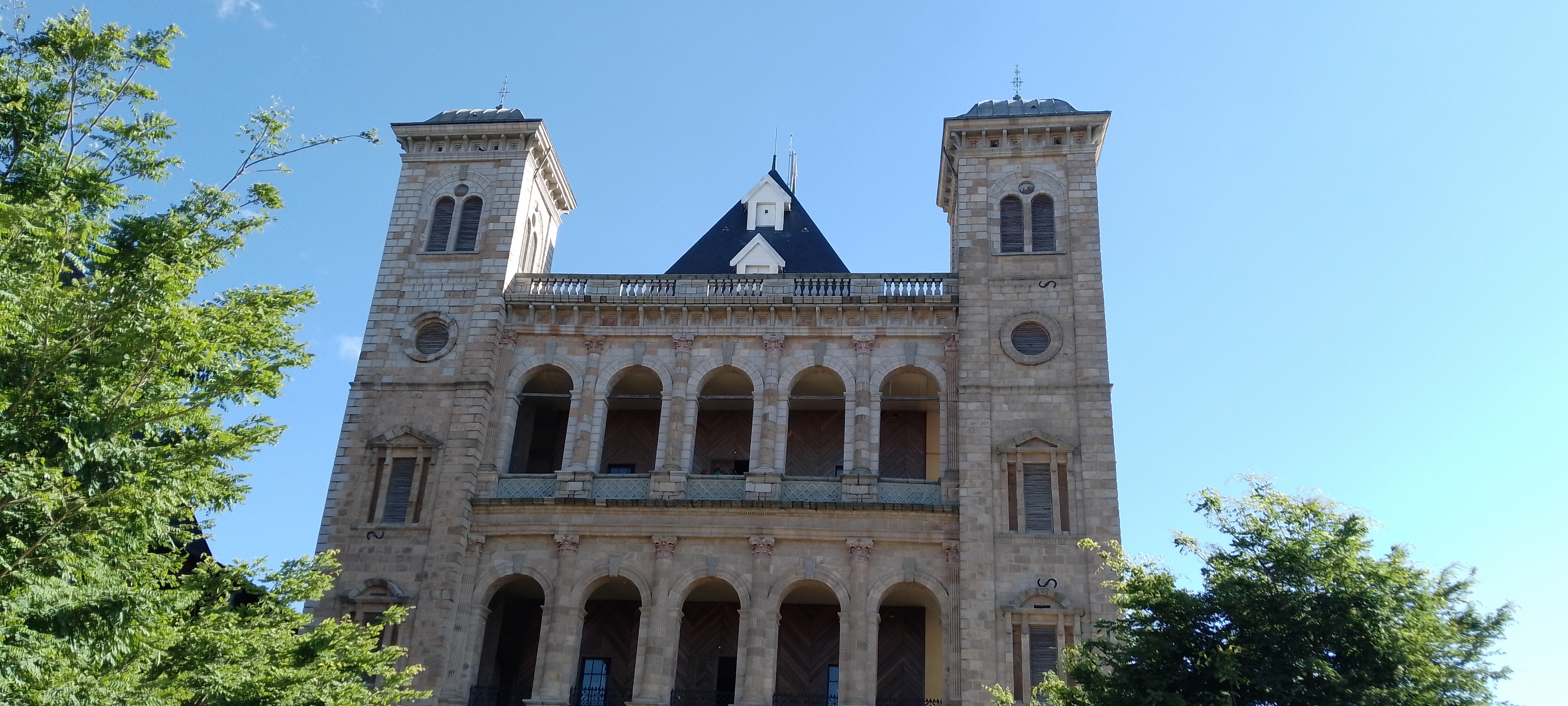
The ancient royal Rovan'i Manjakamiadana overlooking Madagascar's capital, Antananarivo.

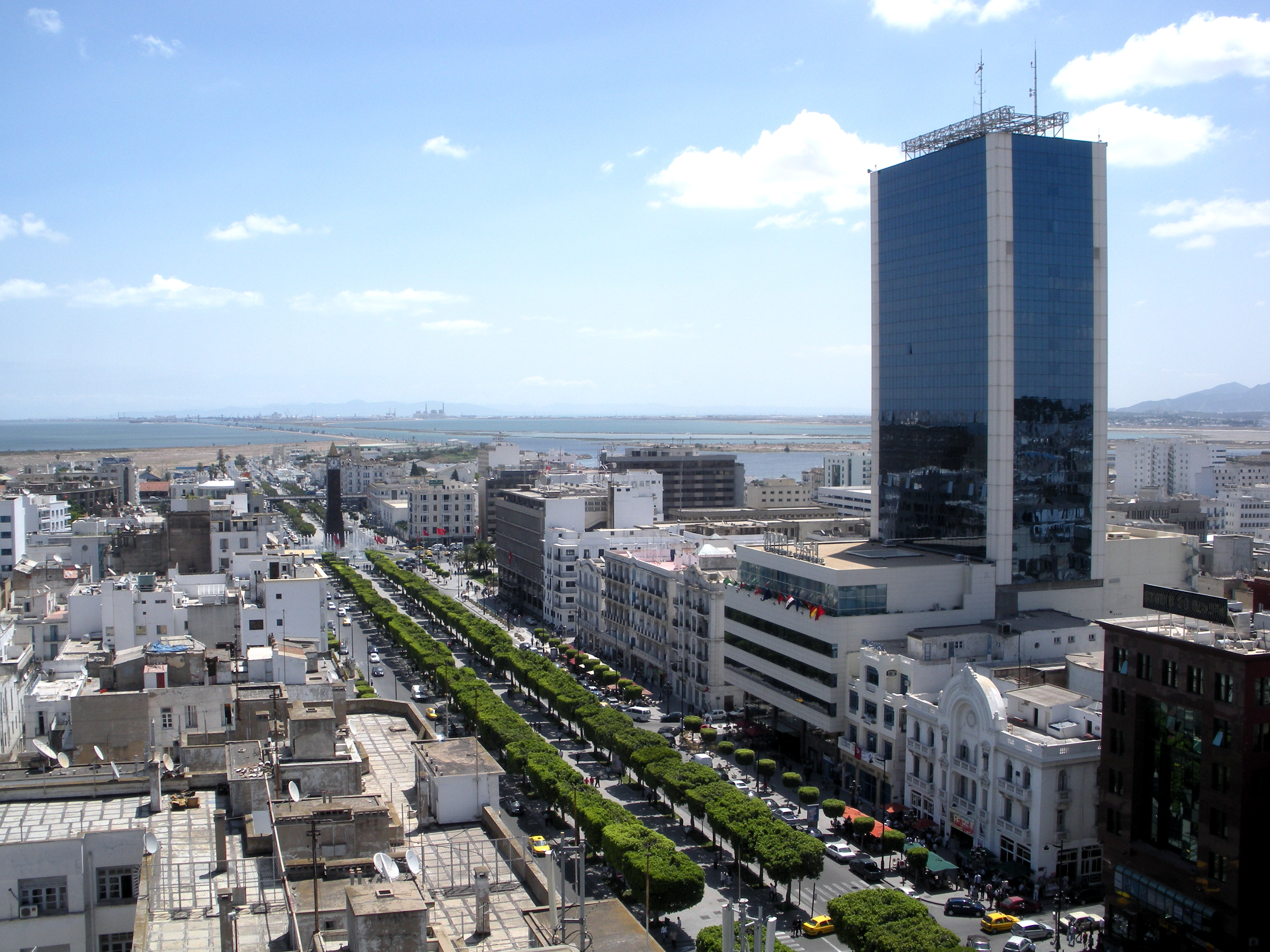
Avenue Habib Bourguiba in Tunis, the Tunisian commercial turntable.

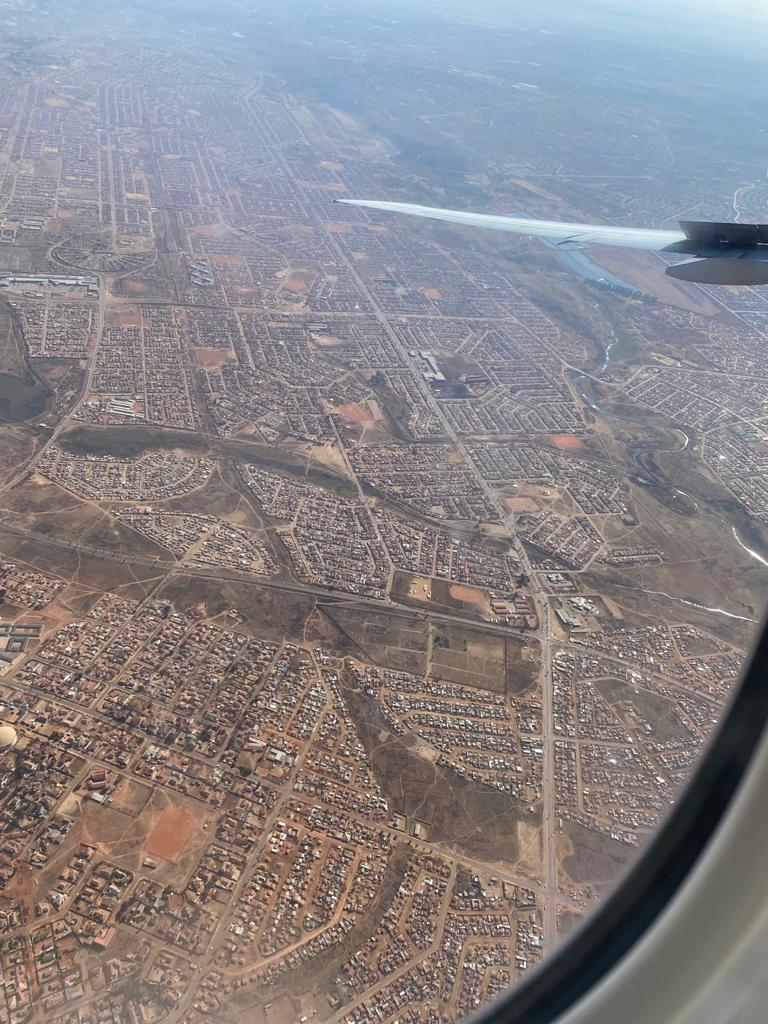
Aerial view of Harare, Zimbabwe's core city.

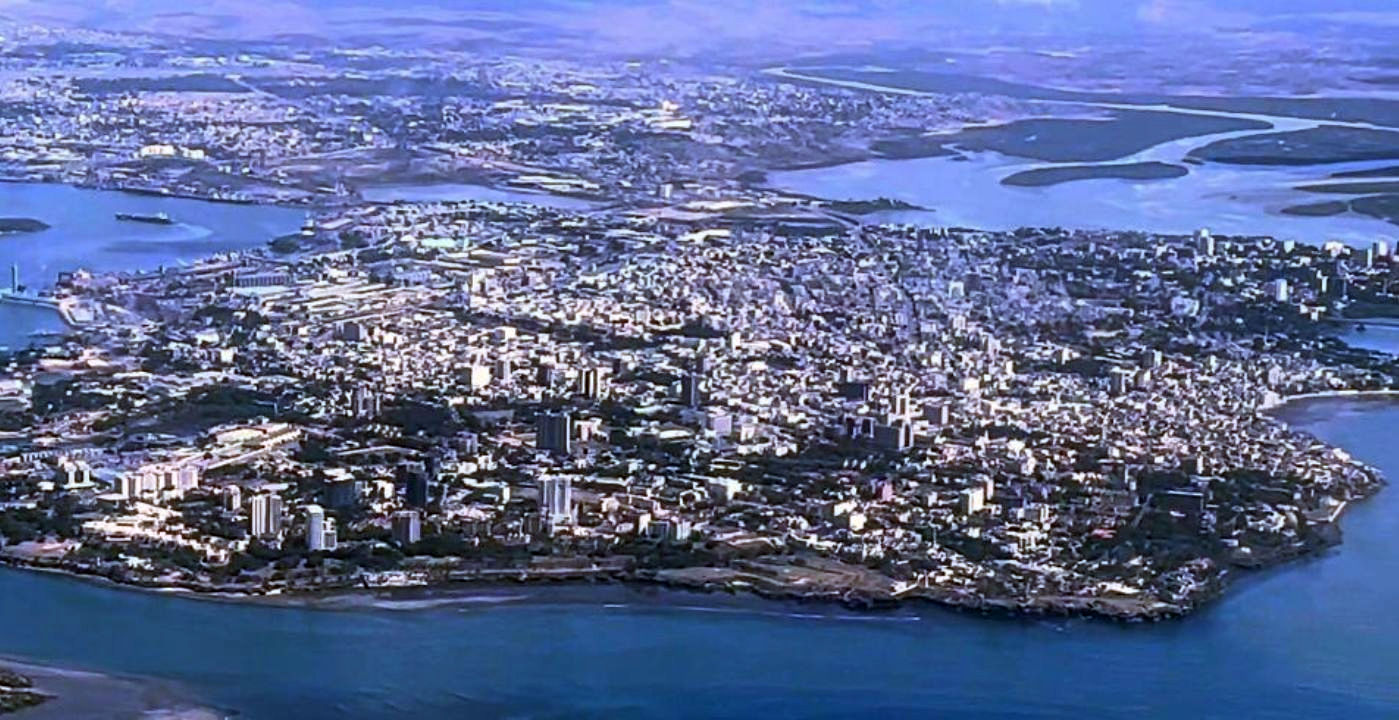
Mombasa, Kenya's historical, second largest city, is its gate to the Indian Ocean trade.

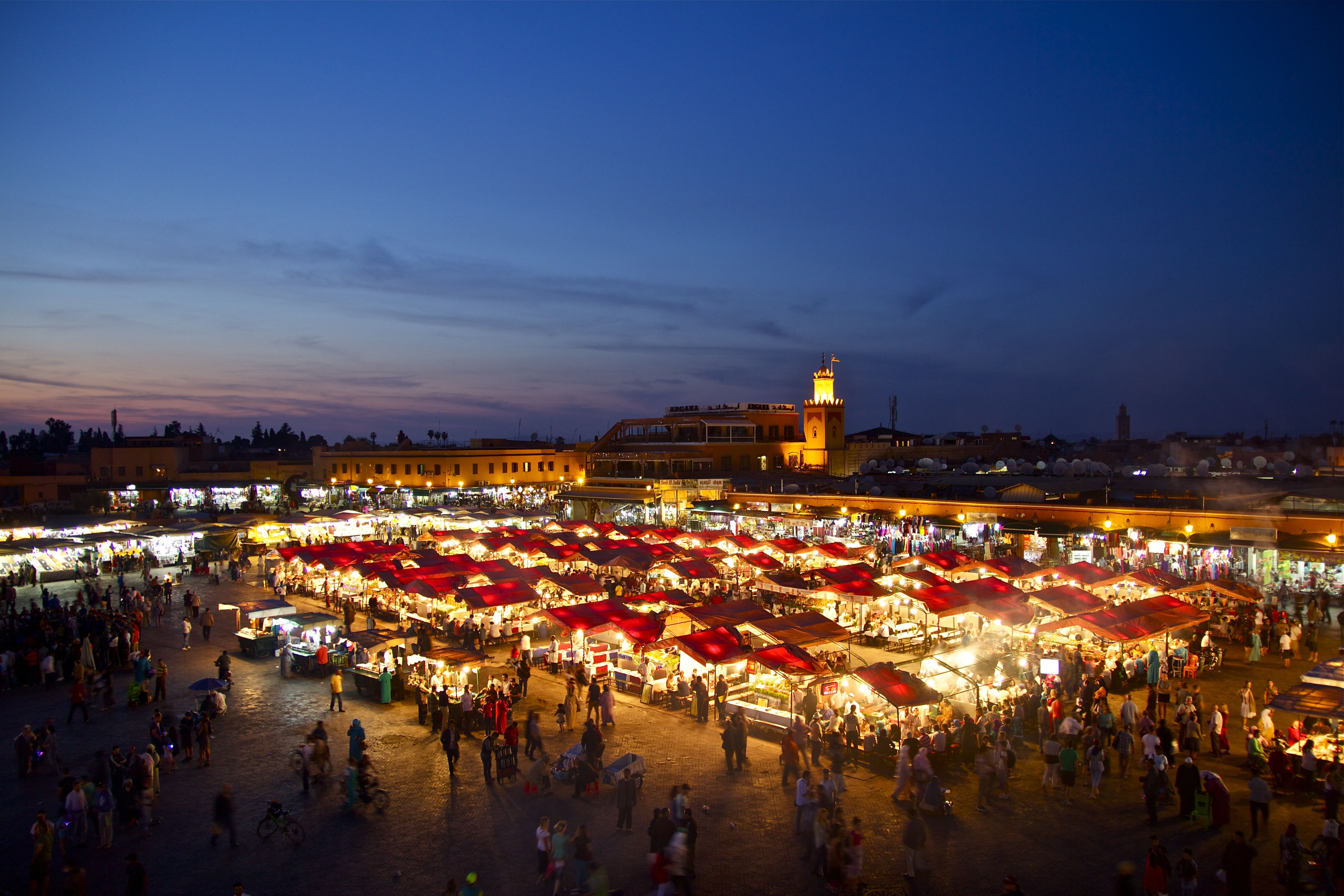
The Jemaa el-Fnaa marketplace in the Moroccan Imperial city of Marrakesh is an old key to the trans-Saharan trade.

The following is a list of the 100 largest cities in Africa by urban population using the most recent official estimate. This reflects only cities located geographically in Africa including related islands.

== List ==
Bold represents largest city in country.

Italic represents capital city.

Rank	City	Country	Population	Year of estimate
1	**Cairo**	Egypt	23,200,000	2026
2	**Lagos**	Nigeria	21,900,000	2026
3	**Kinshasa**	Democratic Republic of the Congo	16,900,000	2026
4	**Nairobi**	Kenya	15,950,000	2026
5	**Johannesburg**	South Africa	15,100,000	2026
6	**Luanda**	Angola	10,400,000	2026
7	**Khartoum**	Sudan	7,400,000	2026
8	**Abidjan**	Ivory Coast	7,300,000	2026
9	**Accra**	Ghana	7,050,000	2026
10	**Dar es Salaam**	Tanzania	6,900,000	2026
11	Alexandria	Egypt	6,350,000	2026
12	**Bamako**	Mali	5,950,000	2026
13	Kano	Nigeria	5,550,000	2026
14	**Kampala**	Uganda	5,350,000	2026
15	Cape Town	South Africa	5,200,000	2026
16	**Addis Ababa**	Ethiopia	4,950,000	2026
17	**Casablanca**	Morocco	4,500,000	2026
18	Giza	Egypt	4,458,135	2023
19	**Algiers**	Algeria	4,400,000	2026
20	**Dakar**	Senegal	4,375,000	2026
21	Ekurhuleni	South Africa	4,066,691	2022
22	City of Tshwane (Pretoria)	South Africa	4,040,315	2022
23	**Conakry**	Guinea	4,000,000	2026
24	Durban	South Africa	3,975,000	2026
25	**Douala**	Cameroon	3,950,000	2026
26	Yaoundé	Cameroon	3,900,000	2026
27	**Ouagadougou**	Burkina Faso	3,550,000	2026
28	Ibadan	Nigeria	3,475,000	2026
29	**Antananarivo**	Madagascar	3,250,000	2026
30	Abuja	Nigeria	3,175,000	2026
31	**Lusaka**	Zambia	3,100,000	2026
32	Lubumbashi	Democratic Republic of the Congo	2,975,000	2026
33	Kumasi	Ghana	2,950,000	2026
34	Omdurman	Sudan	2,805,396	2022
35	**Tunis**	Tunisia	2,775,000	2026
36	**Lomé**	Togo	2,725,000	2026
37	**Harare**	Zimbabwe	2,700,000	2026
38	**Maputo**	Mozambique	2,650,000	2026
39	Mbuji-Mayi	Democratic Republic of the Congo	2,600,000	2026
40	**Brazzaville**	Republic of the Congo	2,550,000	2026
41	**Mogadishu**	Somalia	2,325,000	2026
42	Port Harcourt	Nigeria	2,300,000	2026
43	**Cotonou**	Benin	2,225,000	2026
44	Rabat	Morocco	2,150,000	2026
45	**Kigali**	Rwanda	2,050,000	2026
46	Kaduna	Nigeria	2,025,000	2026
47	**N'Djamena**	Chad	2,025,000	2026
48	**Monrovia**	Liberia	2,000,000	2026
49	**Tripoli**	Libya	1,930,000	2026
50	Benin City	Nigeria	1,840,000	2026
51	Matola	Mozambique	1,796,872	2022
52	**Bangui**	Central African Republic	1,740,000	2026
53	Oran	Algeria	1,670,000	2026
54	**Niamey**	Niger	1,580,000	2026
55	**Nouakchott**	Mauritania	1,550,000	2026
56	Pointe-Noire	Republic of the Congo	1,530,000	2026
57	**Freetown**	Sierra Leone	1,460,000	2026
58	Tangier	Morocco	1,460,000	2026
59	Kananga	Democratic Republic of the Congo	1,420,000	2026
60	Mombasa	Kenya	1,400,000	2026
61	Mwanza	Tanzania	1,390,000	2026
62	Benguela	Angola	1,370,000	2026
63	Touba	Senegal	1,370,000	2026
64	Kisangani	Democratic Republic of the Congo	1,340,000	2026
65	Fez	Morocco	1,330,000	2026
66	**Bujumbura**	Burundi	1,320,000	2026
67	Aba	Nigeria	1,310,000	2026
68	Agadir	Morocco	1,300,000	2026
69	Shubra el-Kheima	Egypt	1,275,700	2023
70	Onitsha	Nigeria	1,250,000	2026
71	**Lilongwe**	Malawi	1,250,000	2026
72	Arusha	Tanzania	1,230,000	2026
73	Maiduguri	Nigeria	1,220,000	2026
74	**Banjul**	Gambia	1,210,000	2026
75	Gqeberha	South Africa	1,200,000	2026
76	Sousse	Tunisia	1,200,000	2026
77	Ilorin	Nigeria	1,190,000	2026
78	Abomey-Calavi	Benin	1,188,736	2022
79	Sokoto	Nigeria	1,180,000	2026
80	Nnewi	Nigeria	1,176,550	2022
81	Marrakesh	Morocco	1,150,000	2026
82	Jos	Nigeria	1,140,000	2026
83	Bukavu	Democratic Republic of the Congo	1,140,000	2026
84	Bobo Dioulasso	Burkina Faso	1,130,000	2026
85	**Asmara**	Eritrea	1,120,000	2026
86	Zaria	Nigeria	1,080,000	2026
87	Zanzibar	Tanzania	1,080,000	2026
88	**Hargeisa**	Somalia (Somaliland)	1,079,377	2022
89	Goma	Democratic Republic of the Congo	1,050,000	2026
90	Enugu	Nigeria	1,040,000	2026
91	Tshikapa	Democratic Republic of the Congo	1,023,575	2022
92	Nyala	Sudan	1,012,312	2022
93	Blantyre	Malawi	994,911	2022
94	Misratah	Libya	953,472	2022
95	Nampula	Mozambique	927,472	2022
96	Warri	Nigeria	910,000	2022
97	Port Said	Egypt	790,000	2024
98	Ikorodu	Nigeria	781,500	2022
99	Suez	Egypt	690,000	2024
100	Mansoura	Egypt	600,000	2024

== Map ==
The 40 largest cities in Africa (those with over 5 million inhabitants highlighted)

== See also ==
- List of urban areas in Africa by population
