= Fuamah District =

District of Liberia

Coordinates: 6.939°N 10.216°W

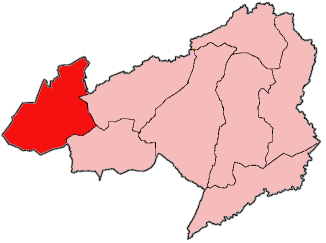
Location of Fuamah District in Bong County

Fuamah District is one of twelve districts located in Bong County, Liberia. It has five third-level subdivisions: Lorlah, Zuluzaryea, Yarbayon, Bubli and Zarwakuma.
