= Sembe, Liberia =

Town in Grand Cape Mount County, Liberia

Sembe
- Location in Liberia
- Coordinates: 6°58′32″N 10°59′11″W
- Country: Liberia
- County: Grand Cape Mount County

Sembe is a town in Grand Cape Mount County, Liberia.
