= Buutuo =

Capital of Zoegeh District, Nimba County, Liberia

Coordinates: 6.8275°N 8.34278°W

- Interactive map of Buutuo
- Country: Liberia
- County: Nimba County
- District: Zoegeh district

Buutuo is the capital of Zoegeh district in eastern Nimba County, Liberia. It is known as the place where the 14-year-long civil war of Liberia began in 1989. Once a growing city with over 25,000 people in the mid and late 1980s, the city has been ruined and reduced nearly to nothing. Before diamonds were found by the locals in the late 1990s and the Ivorian uprising in 2003, the once center of commerce held a population of just over 600 people. Now it is estimated that the town holds just about 2,500 people due to the refugees fleeing the war in Ivory Coast. Most of its inhabitants are part of the Gio ethnic group.
