= Zoegeh District =

Coordinates: 6.86667°N 8.5°W

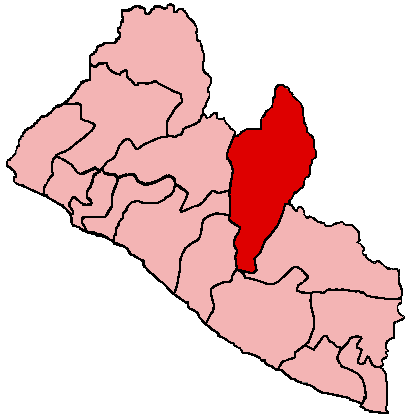
Nimba county of Liberia

Zoegeh District was one of six districts located in Nimba County, Liberia.
