= Palala =

Village in Bong county, Liberia

- Location in Liberia
- Coordinates: 7°0′5″N 9°17′17″W
- Country: Liberia
- County: Bong County
- District: Panta Kpaii

Area
  - Metro: 22 sq mi (57 km^{2})

Population (1992 est.)
  - City: 1,230
  - Urban density: 150/sq mi (57/km^{2})

Palala is a town in Bong County, Liberia.

Palala is a town located in Bong County, Kpaai District, Bong County, Liberia. It is a historical town where many people love peace and stability. This community consist of both Christian and Muslims. Some people lived there who don't have religion.
