= Sanniquellie =

- Location in Liberia
- Coordinates: 07°21′44″N 08°42′22″W
- Country: Liberia
- County: Nimba County
- District: Sanniquellie-Mahn

Government
  - Type: County
  - Superintendent: Fong Zuagele
  - City Mayoress: Mary. N. Gonlepa
- Elevation: 2,523 ft (769 m)

Population (2008)
  - Total: 11,415
- Time zone: GMT
- Climate: Am

Sanniquellie is a city and the capital of Nimba County and Sanniquellie-Mahn District, Liberia. It is located in the north-east of the country at coordinates 07°21'49" N 008°42'40" W. The average altitude of the city is 420 metres above the sea level. As of the 2008 national census, the population stood at 11,415. The most represented tribes are Mano, Gio and Mandingo.

Sanniquellie is situated on the unpaved road connecting Yekepa, Ganta, Gbarnga, Kakata, and Monrovia. The average rainy season lasts from May to October whereas the dry season ranges from mid-October to April or May. The coldest temperatures typically occur from the second half of December through first half of January. The main religion is Christianity (Catholics, Adventists, Methodists) and Islam. You can also find Jehovah's Witnesses and some minor churches there.

The city is divided to quarters and communities (Main Street, Bonnah Suah Compound, Charlie Kpowin Community, Veinpa, Dokie Quarter, Dahnlopa, Animal Farm, Airfield Zone 1, Airfield Zone 2, Old Barracks, New Barracks, Gono Quarter, Floyd Island, Plumcor community, Underground Community). An important concern is the issue of ex-combatants, as some of them did not benefit from the reintegration programs (DDRR) and some of those are facing the troubles to find stable employment in the rural economy. More than 2,000 of the population are employed by "Jungle Water Group of Investment" a Liberian owed company that was established by business man Mr. Tomah S. Floyd Sr a Liberian, Nimbadian from Duo Gorton a village in Nimba Co. Many others have turned to commercial motorcycling and other forms of tertiary sector employment, but for a small number of them crime is how they earn their daily bread.

== Nature ==
Sanniquellie City is surrounded with tropical rain forests with typical fauna and flora. Very common are rubber trees, mango trees, citrus trees, cocoa trees, lianas, various palm trees, bush grass, etc. Many acres of forest were stumped because of agricultural need, revitalization of rubber tree plants, char coal production, etc. The rain forest you can find there is commonly known as secondary bush.

There are various animals living in the tropical rain forest in Sanniquellie surroundings such as: frogs, lizards, snakes, scorpions, many kinds of insect, including malaria-carrying mosquitoes; porcupines, monkeys, bats and birds. There is an artificial lake in the middle of the town, Lake Teleh.

== History ==
Mano and Gio people believe they came to this area in the period of great migration between 1450 and 1650 A.D. Until 1904, the area was ruled by traditional monarchs and warriors.

Sanniquellie was named by native Kpelle people who were sent to the north of the Liberia as border troops (later the Liberian Frontier Force) to defend the internal stability of the country in the middle of the 19th century. The name was too difficult for home tribes of Mano and Gio, so they misspelled it as Sanniquellie/Sannquelle/Sanniquelle/Sanokwelleh. The historical center of the town lies in present-day Bonnah Suah Compound, named after Bonnah G. Suah who was the District Chief for 25 years.

During the 1950s and 1960s, there was an increase in infrastructure and building activities in Sanniquellie. Buildings erected during the 1950s include Queen's Theatre, Public Market, Old Presidential Palace, the water tower, the water plant and some other buildings.

In 1959, the three presidents of Liberia, Guinea and Ghana met in Sanniquellie and started talks that lead to the establishment of the OAU. There were three palava houses built for the three presidents during these talks; currently they lie in ruins. There is a Memorial regarding this event at Yekepa Parking.

In 1985 former General Thomas G. Quiwonkpa, alias "The Son of the County", stormed Yekepa (as a revenge for an unsuccessful coup d'état) in Sanniquellie.

On 24 December 1989, the First Liberian Civil War started in Buutuo, Nimba County and the spark of wrath jumped to Sanniquellie and its surroundings. Years of tension between different tribes and different religion caused armed conflicts. At the New Barracks (newly constructed) the seated company of the Fifth Infantry Battalion was attacked and had to withdraw from the area. The New Barracks were looted and stayed abandoned till the present day. Despite the fact that war ended in 2003, there are some concealed tensions and unsolved problems from the past, which can cause instability in the region.

== Administration ==
As a county capital Sanniquellie is an official seat of the Nimba County Superintendent. The current superintendent is Nelson Korquoi; he was installed in office in Sanniquellie City. The private residence of the superintendent is in the Presidential Palace; the offices of the superintendent are situated in the Administration Building. The head of Sanniquellie City is Mayoress Madam Maima kamara.

There is a LNP county headquarters in Sanniquellie - Nimba County Police Detachment (NCPD). NCPD is divided into patrol division, traffic division, Criminal Service Department (CSD) and Women and Children Protection Section (WACPS). NCPD is led by LNP County General Commander (in the rank of C/Supt) and his deputy executive officer (in the rank of C/Insp). Average crime rate is 50 crimes per month (simple and aggravated assaults, thefts, traffic accident, burglaries, misconducts; rarely drug trafficking, rapes or homicides). The area is calm and normal without any hazards for visitors and travelers.

There are also the other law enforcement agencies as: BIN (Bureau of Immigration and Naturalization), DEA (Drug Enforcement Agency), MNS (Ministry of National Security), NBI (National Bureau of Investigation), Bureau of Corrections (which manages Sanniquellie Central Prison).

There is a headquarters of LNFS (Liberia National Fire Service). But this service is completely paralyzed, because it has no firefighting equipment, only an empty building and a commander with his deputy.

The judiciary system is represented by the Sanniquellie Magisterial Court (headed by Stipendary Magistrate and located near the LNP station) and the 8th Judiciary Circuit Court (headed by Residing Judge and located near UNMIL compound), a Public Defender and the County Attorney. The judiciary system is very slow and ineffective, and corruption practices are very usual and common.

Line ministries have their offices in Sanniquellie, too (Ministry of Land and Mines, Stephen Divine DARWORLORetc.).

== Economy ==
The main moneymaking activity in Sanniquellie and its surroundings is rubber production. There is a Firestone buying station located at New Barracks Junction.

No less important is rice production. There are many rice fields in the town and outside, and the other equipment related to rice production are rice kitchens and rice mills. The product is called country rice. Vegetable (pepper, bitter balls, cucumbers, corn, cassava, eddoes, potatoes, tomatoes, peanuts) and fruit (pineapples, limes, mandarins, grapefruits, oranges, bananas, plaintains, mangoes, plums) production is provided by local farms supplying local markets or the market in Monrovia (mainly plantains and bananas).

As a part of post-war revitalisation many people were trained as carpenters, fitters, plumbers, bakers, masons, car/motorbike repair technicians, tailors and barbers - these kinds of services are found in the town. The biggest company in the town is Jungle Water Group of Investments providing transport services, accommodation, general merchandise and diamond business.

There is a mining area in Mt. Tokade, near the town of Zolowee (12 kilometers north from Sanniquellie), run by Arcelor Mittal Steel Co. Another area of exploration is run by BHP Billiton, in Gehwee town (just 6 kilometers south from Sanniquellie).

== United Nations ==
Sanniquellie is the seat of UNMIL offices such as UNPOL (team UN police officers monitoring LNP), UNPOL CAU (Correction Advisory Unit monitoring Bureau of Corrections), Civil Affairs, HRPS, LJSSD. There is also mechanized troop of BANBAT-18 as a UN military component. All UNMIL offices are located on Main Street in the area of the Presidential Palace. A platoon of BANENGR-13 is also locater in the UN campus for maintenance of Sanniquellie- Yekepa and Sanniquellie- Loguatuo road.

== Public health ==
Health care trails behind the usual standards. There is G. W. Harley Hospital run by IRC. Hospital is situated near the Main Street in front of Charlie Kpowin Community. Medical care is free there. Hospital operates with ambulance cars which can be sent to traffic accidents or in the case of serious injuries. Hospital disposes of acute care ward, maternity ward and bed-ward. The quality of medical care is not sufficient and not according to the standards. On the other side of the town there is Saint Mary Clinic which offers in working hours medical care. The services of Saint Mary Clinic are paid. There are many drug stores in the town, many types of common drugs (against malaria, cold, stomach troubles, aches, etc.) are sold free without any administrative restrictions.

== Education ==
There are four high schools in Sanniquellie City (St. Mary's High School, Shirley L. Harrison Memorial High School, Levi H. Martin Baptist High School, Sanniquellie Central High School) and large number of elementary and lower schools including the Muslim Union School, Dolo School, Dokie School; a university was built in 2010. The Shirley L. Harrison Memorial School, formerly called the SDA School, was established as an elementary school by two American Adventists and later gained high school status.

== Transportation ==
Sanniquellie was an intermediate station on the Lamco iron ore railway connecting Yekepa and port of Buchanan. New owner of Yekepa mining area Arcelor Mittal reconstructed railroad in the years 2008–2009. First train with iron ore should be sent in 2011. There is no organized mass transportation. All depend on private cars, taxi cabs and motorcyclists. There are two transport organizations joining motorbike drivers and car operators: LMTU (Liberia Moto Transport Union) and FRTUL. The taxis and bike standpoint is in the middle of the city at Yekepa parking.

== Life in the city ==
There is one bank in Sanniquellie. Other nearest banks are Ecobank and LBDI banks in Yekepa and Ganta with several banks (some equipped with ATM).

There are many motels with class standard accommodations in Sanniquellie. You can find many types of local shops and selling booths on the streets of Sanniquellie offering wide range of goods, food, drinks. Typical food you can get and eat in Sanniquellie: roasted corn, roasted cassava, GB, fufu, bread, eggs, pepper soup, cabbage soup, potato green, palava sour, jolof rice, country rice.

There are two FM radio stations in Sanniquellie: Radio Nimba (95.10 MHz) and Radio Sehway. All main Liberian mobile phone operators operate in the area (Lonestar, Cellcom, Libercell, and Novafon). The post office was renovated and reopened in 2009, it is located on the Main Street. It provides worldwide postal services.

Public Market (built up in 1958) joins the marketeers inside the building and in surrounding areas. Main goods offered at the market is vegetable, fruits, rice, nuts, meet, oil, spices, clothing, cloths, charcoal, shoes and household articles. There is market day every Saturday. There are many sport clubs in Sanniquellie, some of them work at the school or church, some of them are run by NGOs, some of them are independent. So you can find there county football team (winner of Liberia National Cup 2010), YMCA football team, SPVC (Sport for Peace Volleyball Club), Youth Academy Football Club and many others.

Within the scope of help to Liberia there are many NGOs working in Sanniquellie such as: IRC - International Rescue Committee, DRC - Danish Refugee Council, NRC - Norwegian Refugee Council, The MENTOR Initiative, religious ministries, Medecins Sans Frontieres, ICRC - International Committee of the Red Cross, LRC - Liberian Red Cross.
