= Telephone numbers in Liberia =

- Country: Liberia
- Continent: Africa
- Country code: +231
- International access: 00

The following are the telephone codes in Liberia.

== Calling formats ==
The NSN length is 7, 8 or 9 digits, depending on the number type.

== List of allocations in Liberia ==
List of allocations
Number range	NSN	Service	Operator
2X XXX XXX	8	Fixed	LIBTELCO
220 XXX XXX	9	Mobile	LIBTELCO
555 XXX XXX	9	Mobile	Lonestar Cell MTN
880 XXX XXX	9	Mobile	Lonestar Cell MTN
881 XXX XXX	9	Mobile	Lonestar Cell MTN
886 XXX XXX	9	Mobile	Lonestar Cell MTN
887 XXX XXX	9	Mobile	Lonestar Cell MTN
888 XXX XXX	9	Mobile	Lonestar Cell MTN
770 XXX XXX	9	Mobile	Orange
772 XXX XXX	9	Mobile	Orange
775 XXX XXX	9	Mobile	Orange
776 XXX XXX	9	Mobile	Orange
777 XXX XXX	9	Mobile	Orange
778 XXX XXX	9	Mobile	Orange
779 XXX XXX	9	Mobile	Orange
33 200 XXXX	9		TEMAS
33 202 XXXX	9	Premium rate	Atlantic Realty & Investment Corporation
90 XXX XXX	8	Telemedia	TeleLinks International SAL
90 3XX XXX	8	Premium rate	Interactive Media Corporation

== See also ==
- Communications in Liberia
