= Mining industry of Liberia =

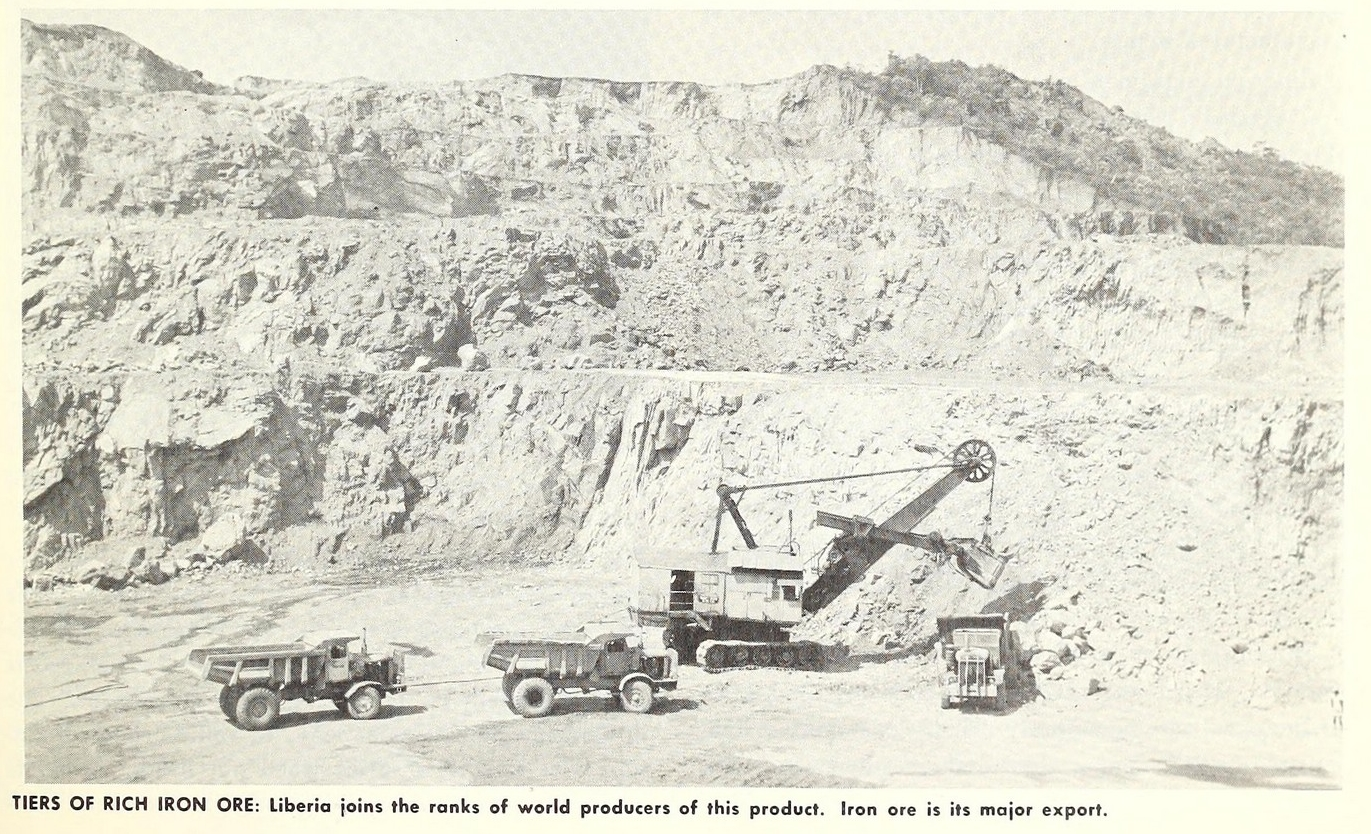
Iron ore mining

The mining industry of Liberia has witnessed a revival after the civil war which ended in 2003. Gold, diamonds, and iron ore form the core minerals of the mining sector with a new Mineral Development Policy and Mining Code being put in place to attract foreign investments. In 2013, the mineral sector accounted for 11% of GDP in the country and the World Bank projected a further increase in the sector by 2017.

Liberia's mining sector is considered the prime mover for the economic growth of the country and its exploitation has to be appropriately balanced with sustainable environmental preservation of its rich biodiversity. Apart from iron ore extractions, cement, diamond, gold, and petroleum resources have also been given due importance to enrich the economy of the country.

== History ==
In the 1970s, one of the most productive gold districts in western Liberia was identified to be Gondoja-Ndablama and Kongba Community Gold Mines Ltd, (Kcgm Liberia), Located in Gbarpolu County. Prior to 1990, mineral exports accounted for the country's export earnings, and it amounted to 25% of its gross domestic product (GDP). However, during the civil wars that lasted for 14 years till 2003, many major mines stopped operation and resulted in near zero contribution to the nation's economy.

While mineral resources in Liberia had remained largely untapped, its alluvial gold has been exploited by the artisanal miners for a long time. By 2004, diamond drilling programmes were underway at KGL, Weaju and Gondoja, while gold prospecting was in operation at Butter Hill, Benjeh, Ndablama, Gbarpolu and Soso Camp. In 2012, there was a significant discovery of petroleum, which remains to be extracted. The source is said to have a potential of one billion barrels.

== Production and impact ==
Officially, extraction of diamonds was 155,000 carats as of 2001, but the quantity illegally smuggled to the neighboring countries of Sierra Leone, Guinea and Ivory Coast was reportedly much higher. Other significant minerals reported are bauxite, beryl, chromite, columbite-tantalite, copper, kyanite, lead, molybdenum, nickel, phosphates, rare earth minerals, silica sands, tin, uranium and zinc, and also beach sands which have zircon, rutile, ilmenite, and monazite.

== Legal framework ==
The enabling laws that govern mineral sector development are: the Mining and Minerals Law of 2000; the Mineral Policy of March 1, 2010; environmental protection guidelines for mineral exploration and exploitation issued by the National Environmental Protection Agency of Liberia; and the MLME. It is mandatory to conduct an environmental impact assessment including social impacts of all mineral exploration projects undertaken by private companies. The Ministry of Lands, Mines and Energy (MLME) has the mandated task to administer the mining activity in the country. The mining laws are patterned on the Australian system.

== Commodities ==
Iron ore extraction has seen a revival in the private sector with projects undertaken by several foreign companies such as: the Putu iron ore project in Grand Gedeh County; the western iron ore deposits in Nimba County; and the Western Cluster Iron Ore (WCIO) project including the Bea Mountain, Bomi Hills, and Mano River iron ore deposits. Mining of the iron ore has witnessed substantial growth in recent years.

Diamond and gold mines are under active development since 2010 under many agreements signed with the private sector.

The New Liberty Gold (NLG) mine covering an area of 457 square kilometres (176 sq mi) is under exploration and extraction under a license granted to the private sector company, African Aura. The Gondoja Hills area which is located 10 kilometres (6.2 mi) to the north east of Weaju is considered productive. In the Bea Mountain region, the Larjor and Kinjor camps are major hard rock artisanal mining locations.

Gbarpolu County still remains one of Liberia's most fertile counties for gold mining.

== Environmental concerns ==
In a 2004 UN environmental report, it was estimated that there were around 5,000 unlicensed and 1,000 licensed mining operations in Liberia. The report said the mines caused damage through the excavation of forests and riverbeds. The report noted that pollutants such as cyanide were used in the mining process, with the cyanide entering rivers. Mercury used in the extraction of gold from ore was also a pollutant mentioned.

== Bibliography ==
- Brooke Pattrick Publications (2004). African Mines Handbook. Brooke Pattrick Publications.
- Thayer, Thomas Prence; Lill, Gordon G.; Coonrad, W. L. (1974). Mineral exploration in western Liberia, 1949–1950. Republic of Liberia, Ministry of Lands and Mines, Liberian Geological Survey.
