= Liberia =

Country in West Africa

Republic of Liberia
- Flag Coat of arms
- Motto: "The Love of Liberty Brought Us Here"
- Anthem: "All Hail, Liberia, Hail!"
- Capital and largest city: Monrovia: 6°30′N 9°30′W
- Official languages: English
- Vernacular languages: English; Kpelle; Bassa; Vai; Klao (Kru); Gio (Dan); Mano; Krahn; Loma; Gola; Kissi; Grebo; Dewoin; Mende; Mandingo; Jabo; Gbandi; Kreyol
- Religion (2018): 85.1% Christianity; 76.3% Protestantism; 7.2% Catholicism; 1.6% other Christians; 12.2% Islam; 1.4% no religion; 1.3% other
- Demonym: Liberian
- Government: Unitary presidential republic
  - President: Joseph Boakai
  - Vice President: Jeremiah Koung
  - House Speaker: Richard Koon
  - Chief Justice: Sie-A-Nyene Yuoh
- Legislature: Legislature of Liberia
  - Upper house: Senate
  - Lower house: House of Representatives

Formation and Independence from American Colonization Society
  - American Colonization Society settlement: January 7, 1822
  - Independence declared: July 26, 1847
  - Republic of Maryland annexed: March 18, 1857
  - Current constitution: January 6, 1986

Area
  - Total: 43,000 sq mi (111,370 km^{2}) (102nd)
  - Water (%): 13.514

Population
  - 2024 estimate: ▲5,437,249 (120th)
  - Density: 150/sq mi (57.9/km^{2}) (160th)
- GDP (PPP): 2025 estimate
  - Total: ▲$11.420 billion (162nd)
  - Per capita: ▲$2,010 (178th)
- GDP (nominal): 2025 estimate
  - Total: ▲$5.170 billion (161st)
  - Per capita: ▲$907 (177th)
- Gini (2016): 35.3 medium inequality
- HDI (2023): ▲0.510 low (177th)
- Currency: United States dollar (USD); Liberian dollar (LRD)
- Time zone: UTC±00:00 (GMT)
- Date format: mm/dd/yyyy
- Calling code: +231
- ISO 3166 code: LR
- Internet TLD: .lr
- Website www.emansion.gov.lr Executive mansion

Liberia, (Note: /laɪˈbɪəriə/) officially the Republic of Liberia, is a country on the West African coast. It is bordered by Sierra Leone to its northwest, Guinea to its north, Ivory Coast to its east, and the Atlantic Ocean to its south and southwest. It has a population of around 5.5 million and covers an area of 43,000 square miles (111,369 km^{2}). The official language is English, though over 20 indigenous languages are spoken, reflecting the country's ethnic and cultural diversity. The capital and largest city is Monrovia.

Liberia began in the early 19th century as a project of the American Colonization Society (ACS), which fomented the emigration of Black Americans from the United States to Africa. Between 1822 and the outbreak of the American Civil War in 1861, more than 15,000 freed and free-born African Americans, along with 3,198 Afro-Caribbeans, relocated to Liberia. Gradually developing an Americo-Liberian identity, the settlers carried their culture and traditions with them while colonizing the indigenous population. Led by the Americo-Liberians, Liberia declared independence on July 26, 1847, which the U.S. did not recognize until February 5, 1862.

Liberia was the first African republic to gain independence, and is also Africa's oldest continuously independent country. Both Liberia and Ethiopia were spared from the Scramble for Africa, when most of the continent was colonized by European powers, though Ethiopia was occupied by Italy from 1936 to 1941. In the early 20th century Liberia saw a large investment in rubber production by Firestone Tire and Rubber Company. These investments led to large-scale changes in Liberia's economy, work force, and climate. During World War II, Liberia supported the U.S. war effort against Nazi Germany and in turn received considerable American investment in infrastructure, which aided the country's wealth and development. President William Tubman encouraged economic and political changes that heightened the country's prosperity and international profile; Liberia was a founding member of the League of Nations, United Nations, and the Organisation of African Unity.

In 1980, political tensions from the rule of William Tolbert resulted in a military coup, marking the end of Americo-Liberian rule and the seizure of power by Liberia's first indigenous leader, Samuel Doe. Establishing a dictatorial regime, Doe was assassinated in 1990 during the First Liberian Civil War, which ran from 1989 until 1997 with the election of rebel leader Charles Taylor as president. In 1998, the Second Liberian Civil War erupted against Taylor's dictatorship, and Taylor resigned by the end of the war in 2003. The two wars resulted in the deaths of 250,000 people (about 8% of the population) and the displacement of many more, with Liberia's economy shrinking by 90%. A peace agreement in 2003 led to democratic elections in 2005. The country has remained relatively stable since then.

Mining in Liberia has been a significant economic driver since the 1960s, though it largely stopped during the Liberian civil wars. Since the end of the civil wars, mining activity increased with emphasis on industrial mining. Mining has also led to concerns about environmental degradation and environmental destruction such as deforestation, water pollution, and air pollution. Industrial miners' poor wages, working conditions, and living conditions have sparked protests from the beginning of the Liberian mining industry continuing to today.

== History ==
=== Early history ===
According to archaeological records, including Oldowan artifacts, ancient humans inhabited West Africa during the Lower Paleolithic era (2.9 - 1.7 million years ago).

Undated Acheulean (Early Stone Age) artifacts are well documented across West Africa. The emerging chronometric record of the Middle Stone Age (MSA) indicates that core and flake technologies have been present in West Africa since at least the Chibanian (~780–126 thousand years ago or ka) in northern, open Sahelian zones, and that they persisted until the Terminal Pleistocene/Holocene boundary (~12 ka) in both northern and southern zones of West Africa. This makes them the youngest examples of such MSA technology anywhere in Africa. The presence of MSA populations in forests remains an open question. Technological differences may correlate with various ecological zones. Later Stone Age (LSA) populations evidence significant technological diversification, including both microlithic and macrolithic traditions.

The record shows that aceramic and ceramic LSA assemblages in West Africa overlap chronologically, and that changing densities of microlithic industries from the coast to the north are geographically structured. These features may represent social networks or some form of cultural diffusion allied to changing ecological conditions.

Microlithic industries with ceramics became common by the Mid-Holocene, coupled with an apparent intensification of wild food exploitation. Between ~4–3.5 ka, these societies gradually transformed into food producers, possibly through contact with northern pastoralists and agriculturalists, as the environment became more arid. Hunter-gatherers have survived in the more forested parts of West Africa until much later, attesting to the strength of ecological boundaries in this region.

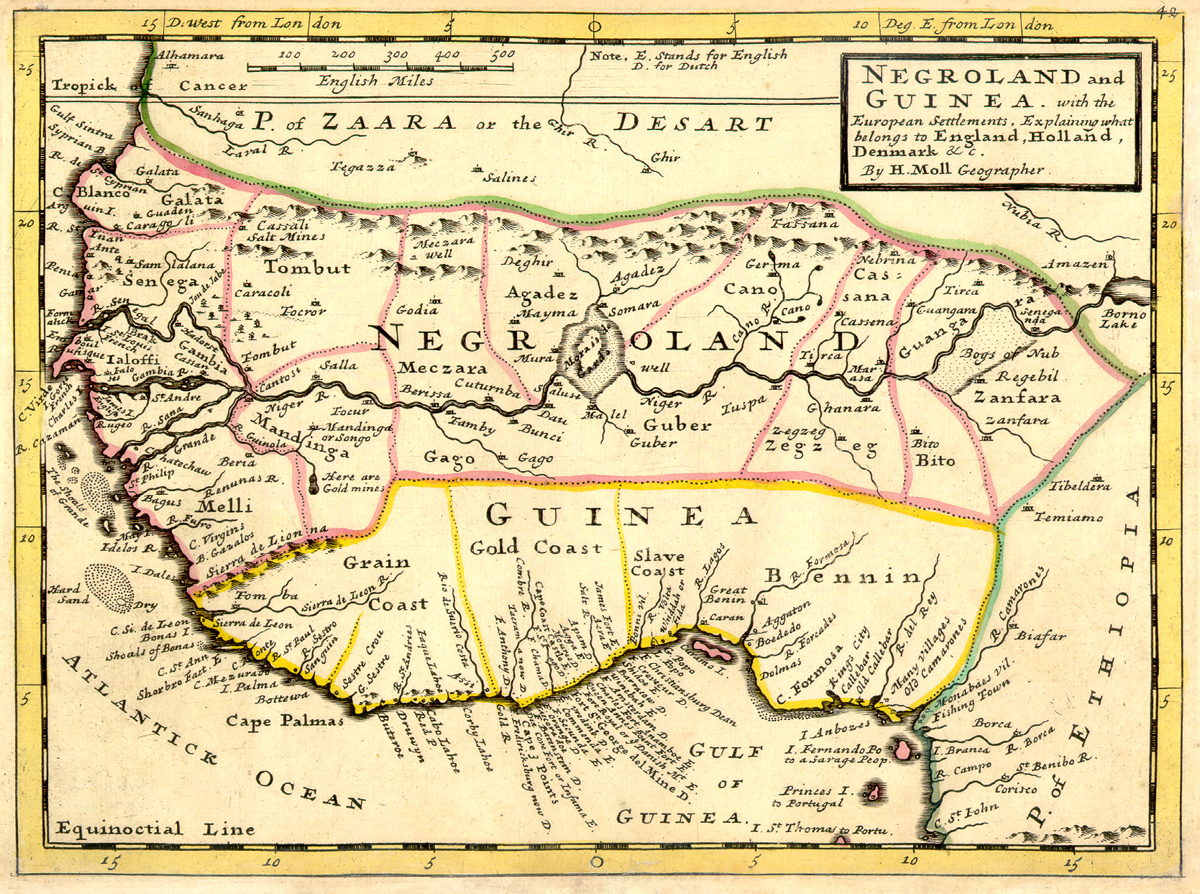
A European map of West Africa and the Grain Coast, 1736. It has the archaic mapping designation of Negroland.

=== Mande expansion ===
The Dei, Bassa, Kru, Gola, and Kissi were some of the earliest documented ethnic groups in the region. The Pepper Coast, also known as the Grain Coast, has been inhabited by Niger-Congo peoples at least as far back as the 12th century. Mande-speaking people expanded from the north and east, forcing many smaller ethnic groups southward toward the Atlantic Ocean.

This influx of these groups was compounded by the decline of the Mali Empire in 1375 and the Songhai Empire in 1591. As inland regions underwent desertification, inhabitants moved to the wetter coast. These new inhabitants brought skills such as cotton spinning, cloth weaving, iron smelting, rice and sorghum cultivation, and social and political institutions from the Mali and Songhai empires. Shortly after the Mane conquered the region, the Vai people of the former Mali Empire immigrated into the Grand Cape Mount County region. The ethnic Kru opposed the influx of Vai, forming an alliance with the Mane to stop further influx of Vai.

People along the coast built canoes and traded with other West Africans from Cap-Vert to the Gold Coast.

=== Early colonization ===
Between 1461 and the late 17th century, Portuguese, Dutch, and British traders had contacts and trading posts in the region. The Portuguese named the area Costa da Pimenta ("Pepper Coast") but it later came to be known as the Grain Coast, due to the abundance of melegueta pepper grains. The traders would barter commodities and goods with local people.

In the United States, there was a "Back-to-Africa" movement to settle African Americans, both free people of color and formerly enslaved, in Africa. This was partially because they faced racial discrimination in the form of political disenfranchisement and the denial of civil, religious, and social rights. It was also partially because slave owners and politicians feared uprisings and rebellions of enslaved peoples. They believed these uprisings would be motivated by a desire to achieve the freedoms experienced by formerly enslaved peoples, specifically freedom from violence and reunions with separated family.

Formed in 1816, the American Colonization Society (ACS) was made up mostly of Quakers and slaveholders. Quakers believed black people would face better chances for freedom in Africa than in the United States. While slaveholders opposed freedom for enslaved people, some viewed "repatriation" of free people of color as a way to avoid slave rebellions.

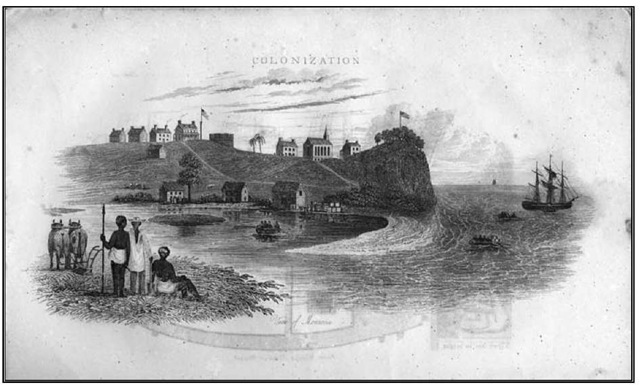
Drawing of Monrovia in 1842

In 1822, the ACS began sending free people of color to the Pepper Coast voluntarily to establish a colony. Mortality from tropical diseases was high—of the 4,571 emigrants who arrived in Liberia between 1820 and 1843, only 1,819 survived. By 1867, the ACS (and state-related chapters) had assisted in the migration of more than 13,000 people of color from the United States and the Caribbean to Liberia. These free African Americans and their descendants married within their community and came to identify as Americo-Liberians. Many were of mixed race and educated in American culture; they did not identify with the indigenous natives of the tribes they encountered. They developed an ethnic group that had a cultural tradition infused with American notions of political republicanism and Protestant Christianity.

According to historian Henryatta Ballah, indigenous Liberian cosmology was centralized around the existence of a supreme being and its worship through specific deities and ancestral spirits that they believed acted as intermediaries between themselves and the supreme being. Certain pieces of land were considered to be part of the spiritual land and were central to Indigenous Liberians' resistance to their loss of land through colonization. Americo-Liberians and the American Colonization Society sought to eradicate all forms of Indigenous religious practices as a form of forced assimilation and to aid in their acquisition of land and political power. The term "witchcraft" was used to describe all Indigenous cosmologies in Liberia and many missionaries described these religious practices as the most barbaric practices of all "native tribes". These ideas about Indigenous Liberian cosmologies drove large-scale assimilation in the country beginning in the 1820s and continuing for decades.

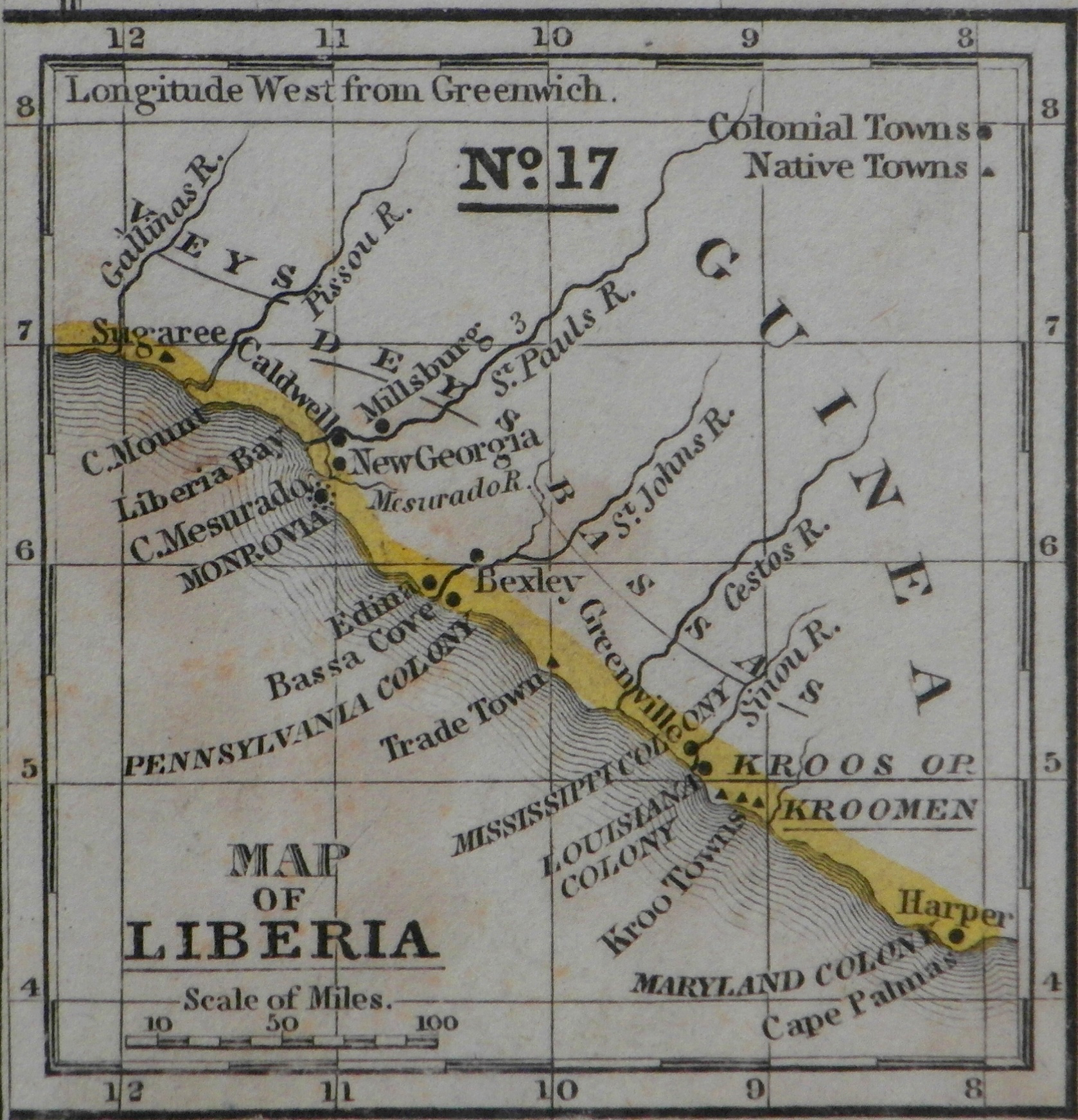
Map of Liberia Colony in the 1830s, created by the ACS, and also showing Mississippi Colony and other state-sponsored colonies

The ACS, supported by prominent American politicians such as Abraham Lincoln, Henry Clay, and James Monroe, believed "repatriation" was preferable to having emancipated slaves remain in the United States. Similar state-based organizations established colonies in Mississippi-in-Africa, Kentucky in Africa, and the Republic of Maryland, which Liberia later annexed. Lincoln in 1862 described Liberia as only "in a certain sense...a success", and proposed instead that free people of color be assisted to emigrate to Chiriquí, today part of Panama.

The Americo-Liberian settlers did not relate well to the indigenous peoples they encountered, especially those in communities of the more isolated areas. The colonial settlements were raided by the Kru and Grebo from their inland chiefdoms. Encounters with indigenous people in rural areas often became violent. Believing themselves to be different from and culturally and educationally superior to the indigenous peoples, the Americo-Liberians developed as an elite minority that created and held on to political power. The Americo-Liberian settlers adopted clothing such as hoop skirts and tailcoats and generally viewed themselves as culturally and socially superior to indigenous Africans. Indigenous people did not enjoy birthright citizenship in their own land until 1904.

=== Political formation ===
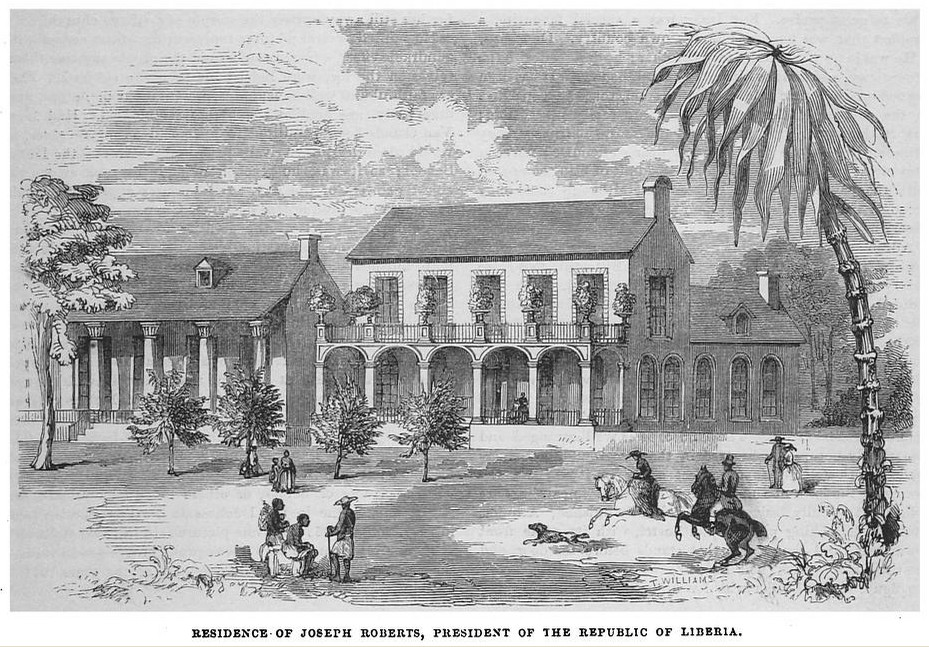
Residence of Joseph Jenkins Roberts, first President of Liberia, between 1848 and 1852

On July 26, 1847, the settlers issued a Declaration of Independence and promulgated a constitution. Based on the political principles of the United States Constitution, it established the independent Republic of Liberia. On August 24, Liberia adopted its 11-striped national flag. The United Kingdom was the first country to recognize Liberia's independence. The United States did not recognize Liberia until 1862, after the Southern states, which had strong political power in the American government, declared their secession and the formation of the Confederacy.

The leadership of the new nation consisted largely of the Americo-Liberians, who initially established political and economic dominance in the coastal areas that the ACS had purchased; they maintained relations with the United States and contacts in developing these areas and the resulting trade. Their passage of the 1865 Ports of Entry Act prohibited foreign commerce with the inland tribes, ostensibly to "encourage the growth of civilized values" before such trade was allowed in the region.

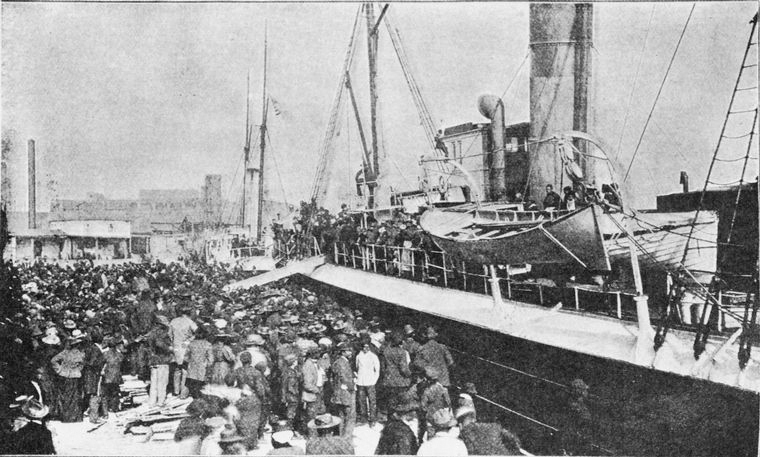
African Americans depart for Liberia, 1896. The ACS sent its last emigrants to Liberia in 1904.

By 1877, the True Whig Party was the country's most powerful political entity. It was made up primarily of Americo-Liberians, who maintained social, economic and political dominance well into the 20th century, repeating patterns of European colonists in other nations in Africa. Competition for office was usually contained within the party; a party nomination virtually ensured election.

Pressure from the United Kingdom, which controlled Sierra Leone to the northwest, and France, with its interests in the north and east, led to a loss of Liberia's claims to extensive territories. Both Sierra Leone and the Ivory Coast annexed territories. Liberia struggled to attract investment to develop infrastructure and a larger, industrial economy.

There was a decline in the production of Liberian goods in the late 19th century, and the government struggled financially, resulting in indebtedness on a series of international loans. On July 16, 1892, Martha Ann Erskine Ricks met Queen Victoria at Windsor Castle and presented her with a handmade quilt, Liberia's first diplomatic gift. Born into slavery in Tennessee, Ricks said, "I had heard it often, from the time I was a child, how good the Queen had been to my people—to slaves—and how she wanted us to be free."

=== Early 20th century ===
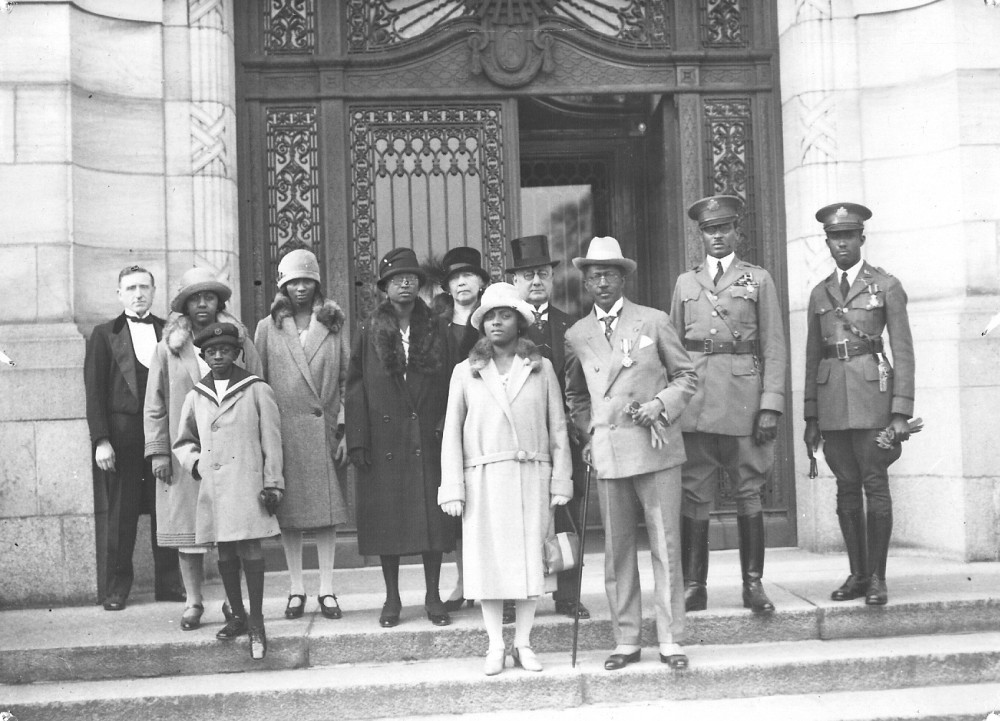
Charles D. B. King, 17th President of Liberia (1920–1930), with his entourage on the steps of the Peace Palace, The Hague (the Netherlands), 1927.

==== World Wars and interwar period ====
In the early 1900s, Liberia's export trade and merchant class largely collapsed. After the partition of Africa between the European powers in the 1800s, American businesses abandoned trade with Liberia and turned to other countries in the Americas for tropical commodities. This abrupt change coupled with Liberia's weak trading links between Britain and France caused Liberia to sink into 'economic insignificance.' Despite this, some trade relations remained between Liberia and Germany, largely due to Germany's lack of tropical colonies.

At the beginning of the 20th century Germany was the only major country with an interest in Liberian trade. By 1914, Germany owned one of the two banks in Liberia as these trade routes strengthened. At the beginning of the first World War, the British Navy cut off German trade with Liberia, effectively severing all Liberian trade. In 1917, Liberia declared war on Germany following the U.S. in the hopes of receiving financial aid from the Allied Powers, specifically the United States. The German bombing of Monrovia was the only battle in which Liberia was directly involved in World War I. Subsequently, it was one of 32 nations to take part in the Versailles Peace Conference in 1919, which ended the war and established the League of Nations; Liberia was among the few African and non-Western nations to participate in the conference and the founding of the league.

Though aid from the United States was promised to Liberia in the amount of $5 million, the US Congress refused to sanction an official loan after the end of the First World War. When this aid did not come and trade continued to dwindle, Liberia was forced to borrow from the Bank of British West Africa, furthering its debt from the $800,000 it owed in 1904. These financial difficulties helped pave the way for multinational foreign investment companies, specifically those interested in rubber, to make their way into Liberia in the 1920s.

In the early 1920s, the British Empire controlled 67 percent of rubber output. As a result of the depression of 1921–1922, rubber prices fell. In order to protect British plantations, the British Empire placed export duties on rubber. In response, Firestone Tire and Rubber Company looked to begin a rubber plantation in Liberia. Liberia's precarious financial situation and tensions with European powers following the first World War put them at risk for a losing conflict with the United Kingdom and France. Because of this, Liberia agreed to a 99-year lease on one million acres of land in exchange for Firestone's aid in the liquidation of Liberia's indebtedness. This eased tensions with the European banks to whom Liberia owed money and allowed Liberia to focus economically on infrastructure and defense. Despite this exchange, Liberia and its peoples were hesitant about the agreement due to Firestone's proposed extensive involvement in the Liberian economy and government. Regardless of opposition, Liberia was unable to separate Firestone's involvement in the country's financial and governmental sectors due to the company's financial aid and Liberia's debt. Liberia eventually agreed to Firestone's terms at the urging of the United States government.

The onset of the 1929 depression in the United States caused an extreme drop in the price of rubber, significantly lowering rubber plantations' expected revenue. In light of this, Liberia sought to relieve itself of its repayment obligations to Firestone. Firestone was not responsive to the Liberians' requests, and in December 1932 Liberia unilaterally suspended repayment. Work on the plantation was suspended, and Firestone called on the U.S. government to send a warship to Monrovia. The dispute was settled in 1935, with Firestone advancing $650,000 to Liberia and gaining exemption from the export tax and from personal income tax on its expatriate employees for the rest of the time it took to repay the loan.

Firestone was confronted with labor force issues within its Liberia plantations. The Liberian people had, up to that point, largely participated in subsistence agriculture and did not participate in a market economy. This made it difficult for Firestone to develop a wage-labor force. In response, the company attempted to redesign Liberia's economic and labor system through impressment, tax systems designed to pry labor out of the traditional economy by creating need for cash income, and forced labor. Because of Firestone's existence as the only major employer besides the Liberian government, these exploitative systems existed until they were abolished in the 1970s. However, scholars such as Animesh Ghoshal argue that these colonial structures still exist today in different forms.

In 1927, the country's elections again showed the power of the True Whig Party, with electoral proceedings that have been called some of the most rigged ever; the winning candidate was declared to have received votes amounting to more than 15 times the number of eligible voters. (The loser actually received around 60% of the eligible vote.)

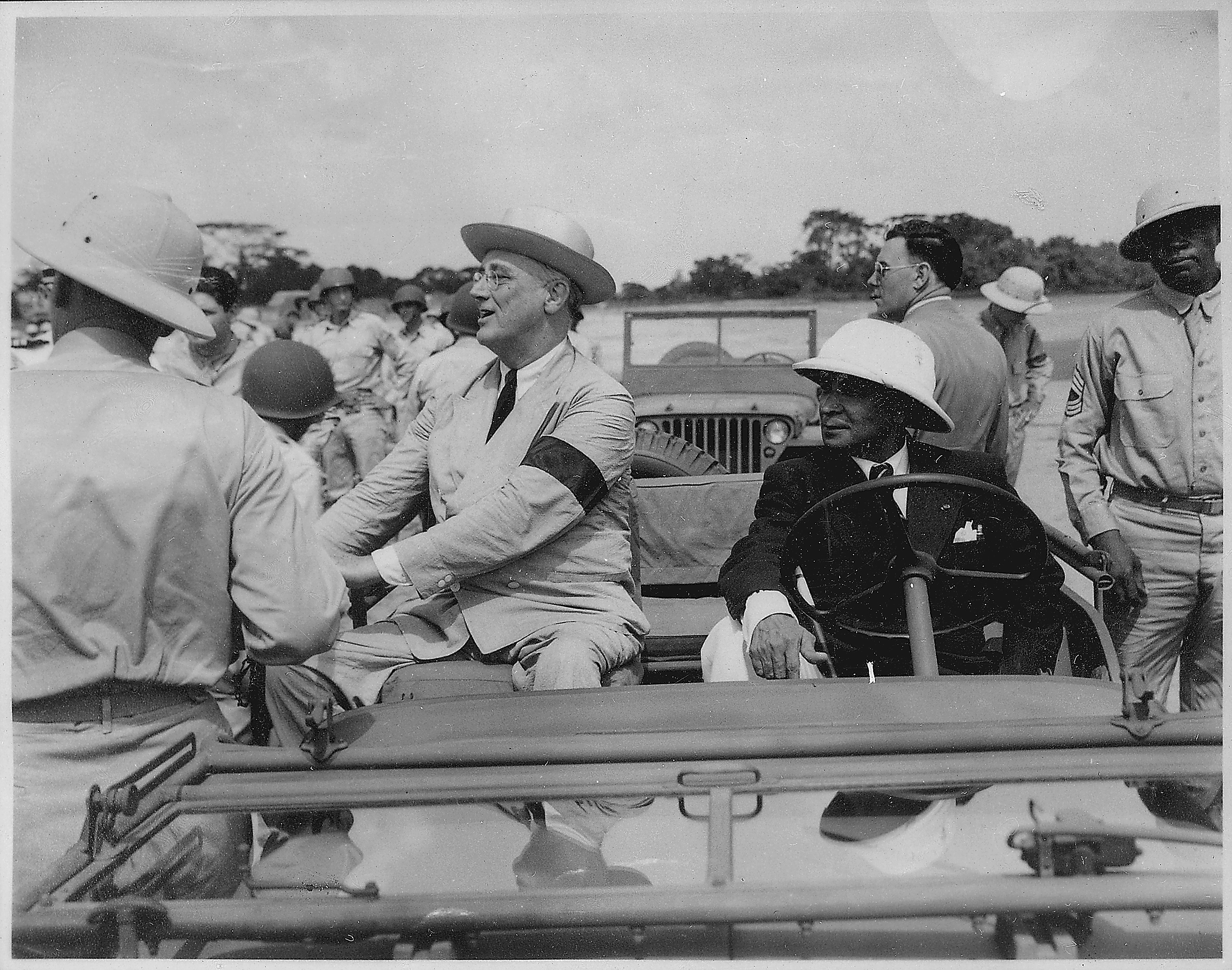
President Edwin Barclay (right) and President Franklin D. Roosevelt during World War II, 1943

Soon after, allegations of modern slavery in Liberia led the League of Nations to establish the Christy Commission. Findings included government involvement in widespread "forced or compulsory labour". Minority ethnic groups especially were exploited in a system that enriched well-connected elites. As a result of the report, President Charles D. B. King and Vice President Allen N. Yancy resigned.

In the mid-20th century, Liberia gradually began to modernize with American assistance. During World War II, the United States made major infrastructure improvements to support its military efforts in Africa and Europe against Germany. It built the Freeport of Monrovia and Roberts International Airport under the Lend-Lease program before its entry into the Second World War.

In 1944, President Tubman announced his "Open Door" policy. This policy, which encouraged foreign investment, gave Liberia an attractive climate for foreign investment and increased involvement of multinational foreign investment in the country. Despite this, Firestone remained and still remains one of the largest influences on the Liberian economy. This influence has raised concerns in regards to the effects of foreign investment on Liberia's political and economic policies. Economists such as Elliot Berg have stated that economic growth may be confined to export goods with foreign producers, which removes some of Liberia's economic autonomy. In international affairs, it was a founding member of the United Nations, a vocal critic of South African apartheid, a proponent of African independence from European colonial powers, and a supporter of Pan-Africanism. Liberia also helped to fund the Organisation of African Unity.

=== Late 20th-century political instability ===
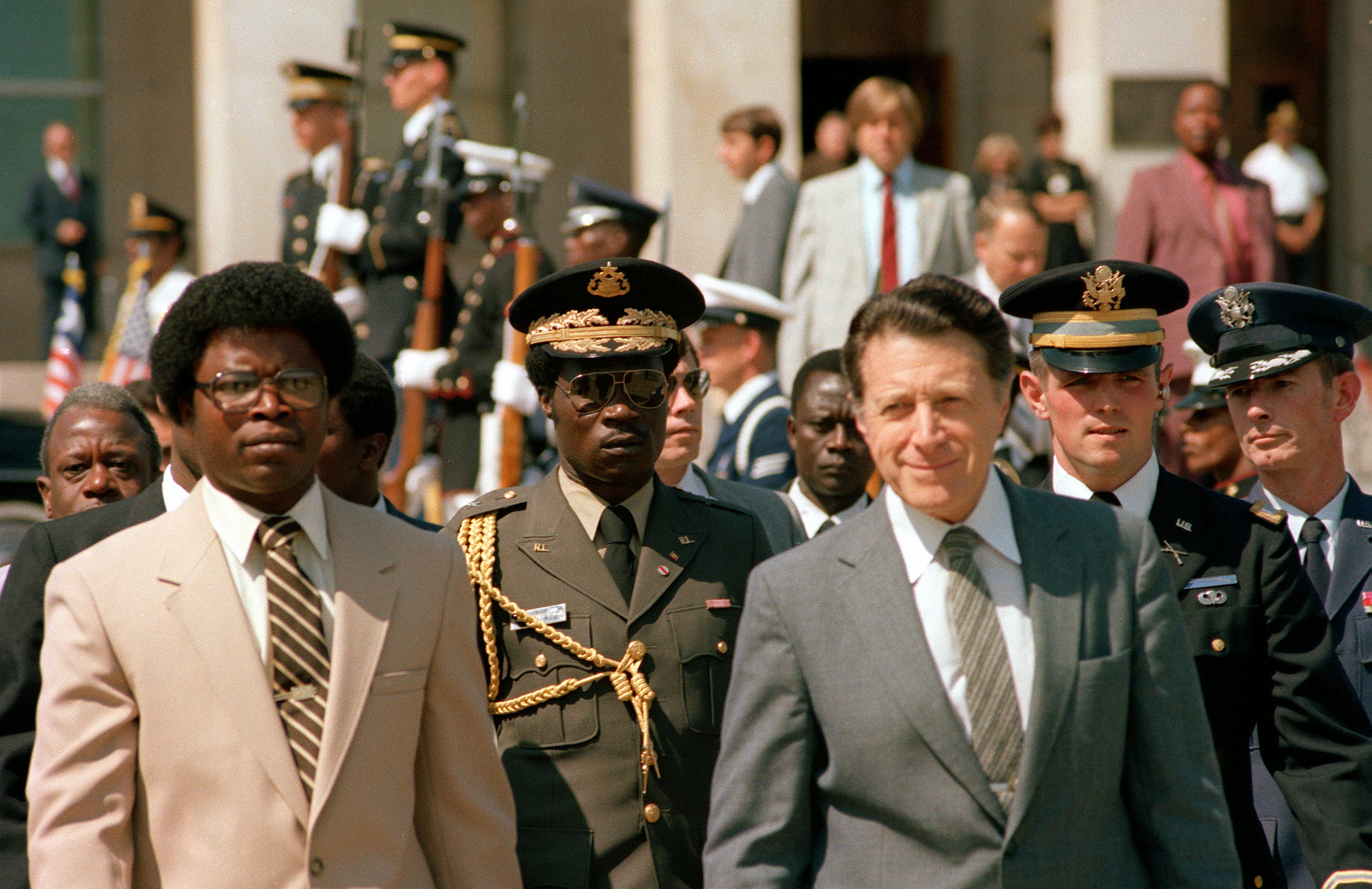
President Samuel Doe with United States Secretary of Defense Caspar Weinberger during a visit to Washington DC in 1982

On April 12, 1980, a military coup led by Master Sergeant Samuel Doe of the Krahn ethnic group overthrew and killed President William R. Tolbert Jr. Doe and the other plotters later executed most of Tolbert's cabinet and other Americo-Liberian government officials and True Whig Party members on a Monrovia beach. The coup leaders formed the People's Redemption Council (PRC) to govern the country. A strategic Cold War ally of the West, Doe received significant financial backing from the United States while critics condemned the PRC for corruption and political repression.

After Liberia adopted a new constitution in 1985, Doe was elected president in subsequent elections that were internationally condemned as fraudulent. On November 12, 1985, a failed coup was launched by Thomas Quiwonkpa, whose soldiers briefly occupied the national radio station. Government repression intensified in response, as Doe's troops responded by executing members of the Gio and Mano ethnic groups in Nimba County.

The National Patriotic Front of Liberia, a rebel group led by Charles Taylor, launched an insurrection in December 1989 against Doe's government with the backing of neighboring countries such as Burkina Faso and Ivory Coast. This triggered the First Liberian Civil War. By September 1990, Doe's forces controlled only a small area just outside the capital, and Doe was captured and executed in that month by rebel forces.

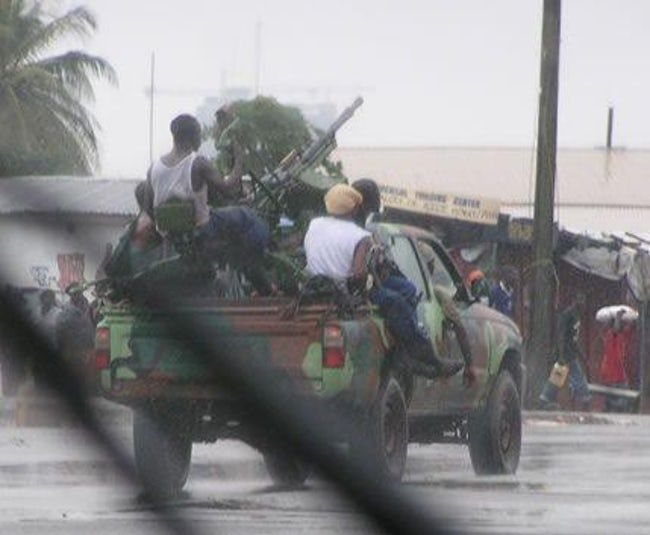
A technical in Monrovia during the Second Liberian Civil War

The rebels soon split into conflicting factions. The Economic Community Monitoring Group under the Economic Community of West African States organized an armed intervention. Between 1989 and 1997, around 60,000 to 80,000 Liberians died, and, by 1996, around 700,000 others had been displaced into refugee camps in neighboring countries. A peace deal between warring parties was reached in 1995, leading to Taylor's election as president in 1997.

Under Taylor's leadership, Liberia became a pariah state due to its use of blood diamonds and illegal timber exports to fund the Revolutionary United Front in the Sierra Leone Civil War. The Second Liberian Civil War began in 1999 when Liberians United for Reconciliation and Democracy, a rebel group based in the northwest of the country, launched an armed insurrection against Taylor.

=== 21st century ===
In March 2003, a second rebel group, Movement for Democracy in Liberia, began launching attacks against Taylor from the southeast. Peace talks between the factions began in Accra in June of that year, and Taylor was indicted by the Special Court for Sierra Leone (SCSL) for crimes against humanity the same month. By July 2003, the rebels had launched an assault on Monrovia. Under heavy pressure from the international community and the domestic Women of Liberia Mass Action for Peace movement, Taylor resigned in August 2003 and went into exile in Nigeria. A peace deal was signed later that month.

The United Nations Mission in Liberia began arriving in September 2003 to provide security and monitor the peace accord, and an interim government took power the following October. The subsequent 2005 elections were internationally regarded as the freest and fairest in Liberian history. Ellen Johnson Sirleaf, a US-educated economist, former Minister of Finance and future Nobel Peace Prize winner, was elected as the first female president in Africa. Upon her inauguration, Sirleaf requested the extradition of Taylor from Nigeria and transferred him to the SCSL for trial in The Hague.

In 2006, the government established a Truth and Reconciliation Commission to address the causes and crimes of the civil war. In 2011, July 26 was proclaimed by President Sirleaf as National Independence Day. In October 2011, peace activist Leymah Gbowee received the Nobel Peace Prize in her work of leading a women's peace movement that brought an end to the Second Liberian Civil War in 2003. In November 2011, President Sirleaf was re-elected for a second six-year term.

Following the 2017 Liberian general election, former professional football striker George Weah, considered one of the greatest African players of all time, was sworn in as president on January 22, 2018, becoming the fourth youngest serving president in Africa. The inauguration marked Liberia's first fully democratic transition in 74 years. Weah cited fighting corruption, reforming the economy, combating illiteracy, and improving living conditions as the main targets of his presidency. Opposition leader Joseph Boakai defeated Weah in the tightly contested 2023 presidential election. On January 22, 2024, Boakai was sworn in as Liberia's new president.

== Geography ==
A map of Liberia

Liberia is situated in West Africa, bordering the North Atlantic Ocean to the country's southwest. It lies between latitudes 4° and 9°N, and longitudes 7° and 12°W.

The landscape is characterized by mostly flat to rolling coastal plains that contain mangroves and swamps, which rise to a rolling plateau and low mountains in the northeast.

Tropical rainforests cover the hills, while elephant grass and semi-deciduous forests make up the dominant vegetation in the northern sections.

Liberia's watershed tends to move in a southwestern pattern toward the sea as new rains move down the forested plateau off the inland mountain range of Guinée Forestière, in Guinea. Cape Mount, near the border with Sierra Leone, receives the most precipitation in the nation.

Liberia's main northwestern boundary is traversed by the Mano River while its southeast limits are bounded by the Cavalla River. Liberia's three largest rivers are St. Paul, exiting near Monrovia, the river St. John, at Buchanan, and the Cestos River, all of which flow into the Atlantic. The Cavalla is the longest river in the nation at 320 miles (510 km).

The highest point wholly within Liberia is Mount Wuteve, at 4,724 feet (1,440 m) above sea level, in the northwestern Liberia range of the West Africa Mountains and the Guinea Highlands. Mount Nimba, near Yekepa, is higher, at 1,752 metres (5,748 ft) above sea level, but is not wholly within Liberia, as Nimba is located at the point where Liberia borders both Guinea and Ivory Coast. Nimba is thus the tallest mountain in those countries as well.

=== Climate ===
Liberia map of Köppen climate classification

The equatorial climate, in the south of the country, is hot year-round, with heavy rainfall from May to October and a short interlude in mid-July to August. During the winter months of November to March, dry dust-laden harmattan winds blow inland, causing many problems for residents. Climate change in Liberia causes many problems as Liberia is particularly vulnerable to climate change. Like many other countries in Africa, Liberia faces both existing environmental issues and sustainable development challenges. Because of its location in Africa, it is vulnerable to extreme weather, the coastal effects of sea level rise, and changing water systems and water availability. Climate change is expected to severely affect the economy of Liberia, especially agriculture, fisheries, and forestry. Liberia has been an active participant in international and local policy changes related to climate change.

Rubber production, along with Liberia's large-scale production of palm oil, has affected the country's climate. Clearing tropical forest to create farmland has led to a loss of biodiversity and the release of large amounts of greenhouse gases. Despite this, fertilizer use has been the main contributor to the carbon footprint of latex, which is a crucial ingredient in rubber production. According to the president of the Rubber Planters Association of Liberia, Wilhelmina G. Mulbah, high prices and lack of availability of fertilizers have led to almost no fertilizer use among small farmers. Because of this, much of the carbon footprint of latex due to fertilizer use can be attributed to rubber plantations. According to a study published in the Proceedings of the National Academy of Sciences, the expanse of rubber production into forestland could lead to an increase in greenhouse gas emissions caused by deforestation and fertilizer use.

Palm oil production also has effects on the Liberian climate. Industrial oil palm plantations reduce the amount of land available to surrounding communities for sustenance agriculture. Deforestation has led to a decrease in the availability of bushmeat, affecting household diets and the incomes of families who sell bushmeat. Changes in water resource use have decreased water availability for local households and communities, specifically those located near palm oil plantations.

Liberia's mining industry has also been linked to changes in the Liberian environment and climate. The mining industry and water resources are critically linked, as mining uses substantial amounts of water, and the industry also has major effects on surface and ground water resources. With renewed interest in Liberia's mining sector after the end of their second civil war, there was a reopening of major mines such as the Nimba iron mine. These actions have raised concern over their potential effects on water quality, human health, and ecosystem health due to waste rocks, water use, and increased sediment load due to high erosion potential of soil. This erosion and runoff have raised further concerns about the discharge of toxic substances, such as cyanides and heavy metals including acid mine drainage (AMD) that can cause long-term impairment to watercourses and biodiversity.

Communities in Liberia have experienced a significant reduction in forest reserves and access to water since oil palm operations began. This has negatively affected access to foods such as bushmeat and native plants. The Malaysian corporation Sime Darby was fined by the Liberian Environmental Protection Agency for deforestation near rivers, which has affected food and water access for locals. Rubber production has caused similar land use and food access challenges for local communities. Liberia's mining sector has similarly inhibited access to water and arable farmland.

=== Biodiversity and conservation ===
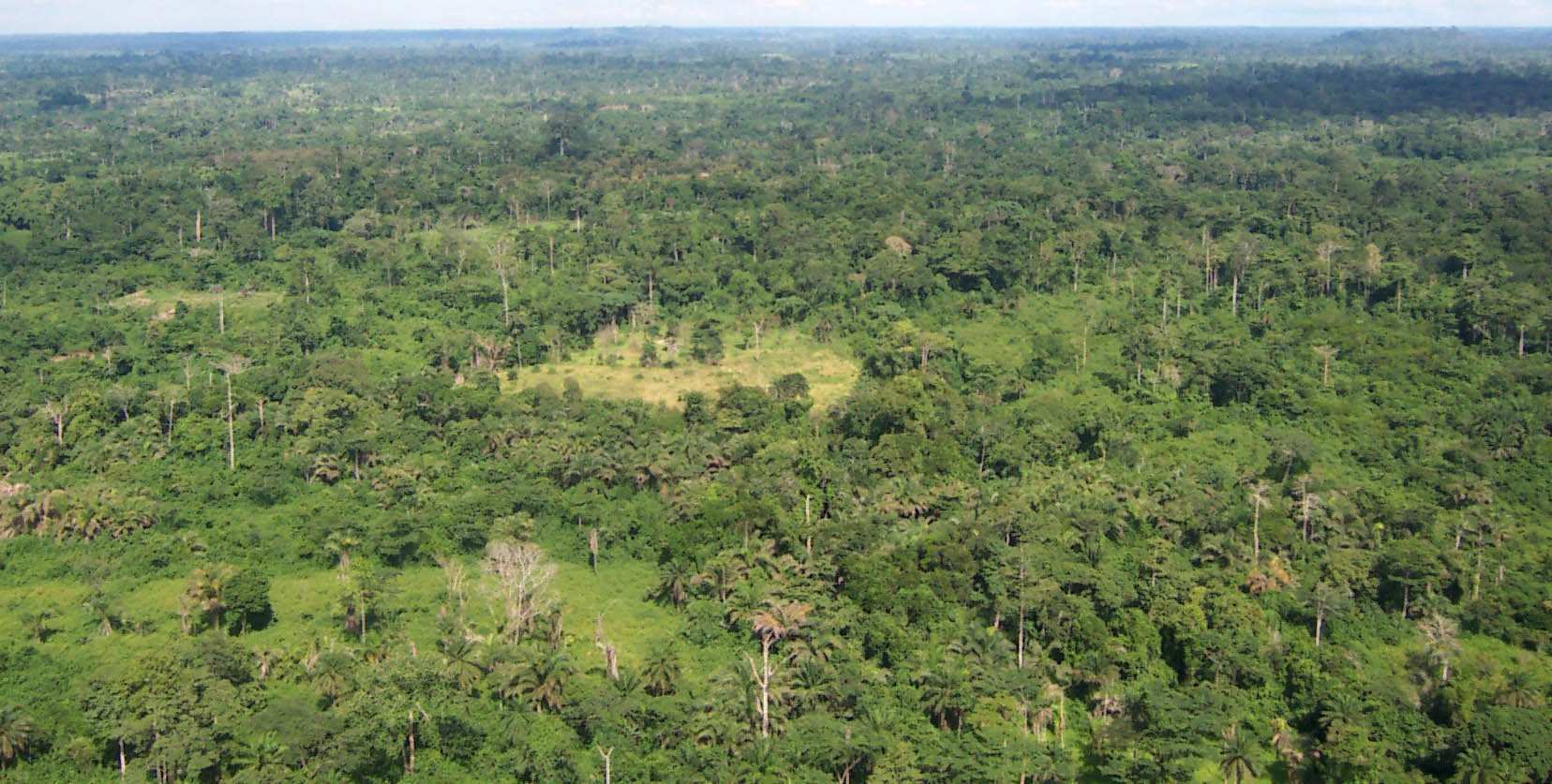
A Liberian tropical forest

Forests on the coastline are composed mostly of salt-tolerant mangrove trees, while the more sparsely populated inland has forests opening onto a plateau of drier grasslands. The climate is equatorial, with significant rainfall during the May–October rainy season and harsh harmattan winds the remainder of the year. Liberia possesses about forty percent of the remaining Upper Guinean rainforest. It was an important producer of rubber in the early 20th century. Liberian rubber production became a major economic driver in the early 20th century with Firestone Tire and Rubber Company's investment in the Country in the early 1920s. Despite its importance as an export good, Liberia's rubber industry has faced criticism for the environmental degradation it causes. The need for land for rubber plantations has led to deforestation, reducing Liberia's biodiversity and food access for Liberian peoples. Fertilizer use on rubber plantations has contributed to waterway pollution and an increase in greenhouse gas emissions, causing damage to aquatic ecosystems and health problems for local Liberian communities.

Four terrestrial ecoregions lie within Liberia's borders: Guinean montane forests, Western Guinean lowland forests, Guinean forest–savanna mosaic, and Guinean mangroves.

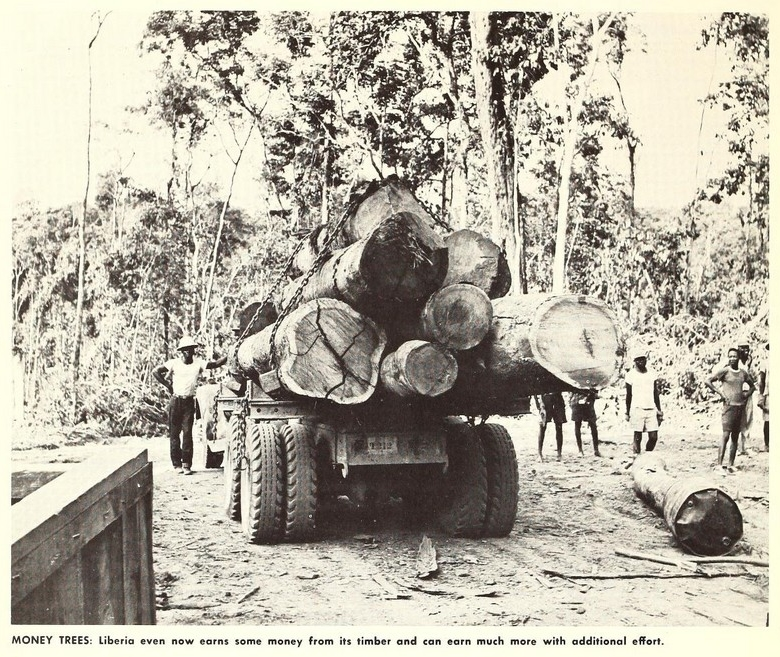
Loggers and logging truck, early 1960s

Liberia is a global biodiversity hotspot—a significant reservoir of biodiversity that is under threat from humans.

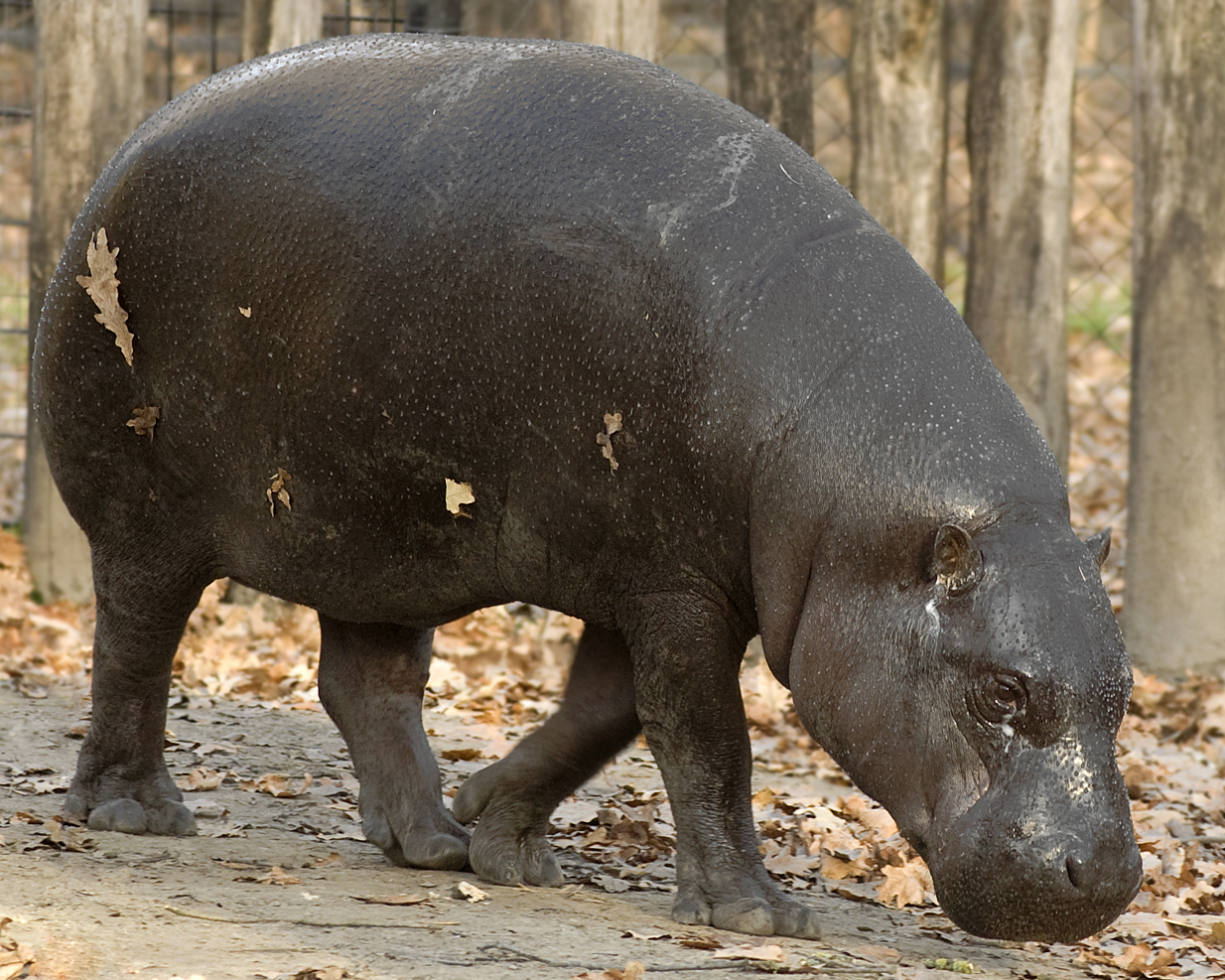
Pygmy hippos are among the species illegally hunted for food in Liberia. The World Conservation Union estimates that there are fewer than 3,000 pygmy hippos remaining in the wild.

Endangered species are hunted for human consumption as bushmeat in Liberia. Species hunted for food in Liberia include elephants, pygmy hippopotamus, chimpanzees, leopards, duikers, and other monkeys. Bushmeat is often exported to neighboring Sierra Leone and Ivory Coast, despite a ban on the cross-border sale of wild animals.

Bushmeat is widely eaten in Liberia, and is considered a delicacy. A 2004 public opinion survey found that bushmeat ranked second behind fish amongst residents of the capital Monrovia as a preferred source of protein. Of households where bushmeat was served, 80% of residents said they cooked it "once in a while," while 13% cooked it once a week and 7% cooked bushmeat daily. The survey was conducted during the last civil war, and bushmeat consumption is now believed to be far higher.

Trypanosoma brucei gambiense is endemic in some animal hosts here including both domestic and wild. This causes the disease nagana. In pigs here and in Ivory Coast, that includes Tbg group 1. Tbg and its vector Glossina palpalis gambiense are a constant presence in the rainforests here. Much research into Tbg was performed in the 1970s by Mehlitz and by Gibson, both working in Bong Mine with samples from around the country. The West African pariah dog is also a host for Tbg.

The Desert Locust (Schistocerca gregaria) is a constant presence here.

The Hairy Slit-Faced Bat (Nycteris hispida) suffers from malaria here.

According to the United Nations Development Programme (UNDP), about 99.5% of Liberian peoples rely on biomass (firewood, charcoal and palm oil) for their energy needs. This trend poses a threat to biodiversity and forests, since the production of these fuels is done in an unsustainable manner. Much of this fuel is obtained through deforestation or mining, both of which have been shown to have negative impacts on the Liberian environment. This production is largely driven by foreign multinational corporations. Pre-colonial Liberia was largely a self-sufficient society. However, according to scholar Aminesh Ghoshal, colonists and multinational corporations altered Liberian labor and economic systems in order to secure a labor force for commercial activities like mining or plantation agriculture.

Illegal logging has increased in Liberia since the end of the Second Civil War in 2003. In 2012, President Sirleaf granted licenses to companies to cut down 58% of all the primary rainforest left in Liberia. After international protests, many of those logging permits were canceled. In September 2014, Liberia and Norway struck an agreement whereby Liberia ceased all logging in exchange for $150 million in development aid. Conservation work in the country has included activities by Conservation International Liberia linked to protected-area management and landscape initiatives in the southeast, including work associated with Sapo National Park and the Grebo forest landscape.

Palm oil production has motivated deforestation of large swaths of Liberian rainforests. Industrial oil palm plantations boast lower levels of plant and animal biodiversity and have lower ecological and social values than the rainforests which they replace. These values include communal space, health, and ecological health. Industrial palm oil production often uses oil palm plants that are not native to Liberia, though native plants have been used in palm oil production, largely by indigenous or small-scale farmers. These changes have impacted the food supply and livelihoods of Liberian communities and households through depleting food sources and abilities of Liberians to acquire and sell natural resources.

Liberia's mining sector has been criticized by environmental scholars and the Liberian Environmental Protection Agency for its effects on conservation and biodiversity. In contrast to the abundance of mineral wealth in Liberia, water resources are vulnerable to environmental impacts from mining activities. Unless appropriate corrective actions are taken, the mining sector is expected to place further degradation on the country's undeveloped water resources. Forest areas are used for the deposit of waste rocks from many Liberian mines, especially after the end of the second civil war. Overburden, rocks and tailings are deposited in the surrounding forest areas, especially around major mines such as the Nimba mine. This poses a threat to wildlife and ecological balance in these areas.

A large contributor to pollution has been foreign involvement in industrial mining and agriculture industries.

=== Administrative divisions ===
Counties of Liberia map

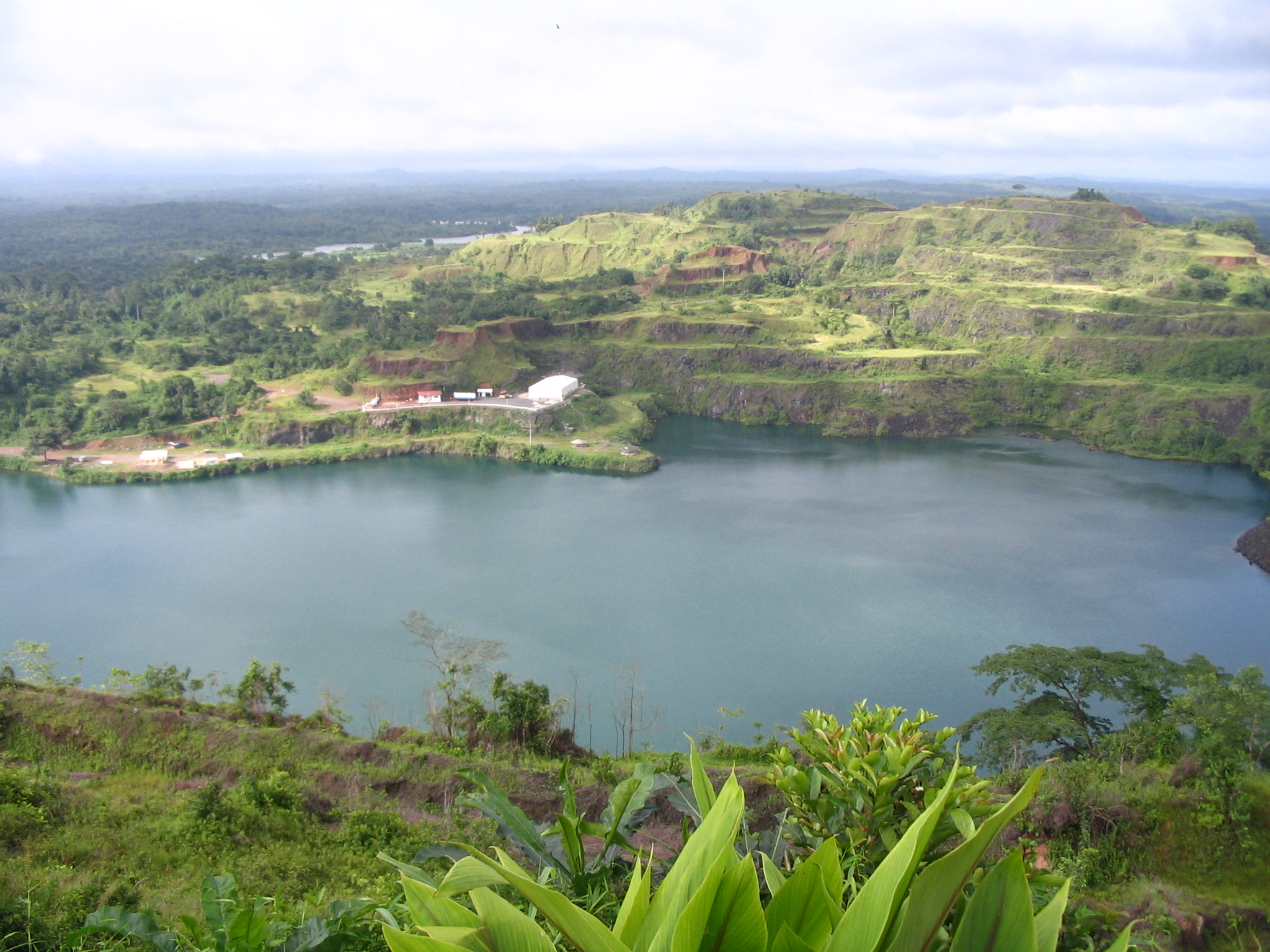
A view of a lake in Bomi County

Liberia is divided into fifteen counties, which, in turn, are subdivided into a total of 90 districts and further subdivided into clans. The oldest counties are Grand Bassa and Montserrado, both founded in 1839 prior to Liberian independence. Gbarpolu is the newest county, created in 2001. Nimba is the largest of the counties in size at 11,551 km^{2} (4,460 sq mi), while Montserrado is the smallest at 737.069 sq mi (1,909.00 km^{2}). Montserrado is also the most populous county with 1,144,806 residents as of the 2008 census.

The fifteen counties are administered by superintendents appointed by the president. The Constitution calls for the election of various chiefs at the county and local level, but these elections have not taken place since 1985 due to war and financial constraints.

Parallel to the administrative divisions of the country are the local and municipal divisions. Liberia currently does not have any constitutional framework or uniform statutes which deal with the creation or revocation of local governments. All existing local governments—cities, townships, and a borough—were created by specific acts of the Liberian government, and thus the structure and duties/responsibilities of each local government vary greatly from one to the other.

Map #	County	Capital	Population (2022 Census)	Area (mi^{2})	Number of districts	Date created
1	Bomi	Tubmanburg	133,668	749 mi^{2} (1,940 km^{2})	4	1984
2	Bong	Gbarnga	467,502	3,386 mi^{2} (8,770 km^{2})	12	1964
3	Gbarpolu	Bopolu	95,995	3,740 mi^{2} (9,700 km^{2})	6	2001
4	Grand Bassa	Buchanan	293,557	3,064 mi^{2} (7,940 km^{2})	8	1839
5	Grand Cape Mount	Robertsport	178,798	1,993 mi^{2} (5,160 km^{2})	5	1844
6	Grand Gedeh	Zwedru	216,692	4,047 mi^{2} (10,480 km^{2})	3	1964
7	Grand Kru	Barclayville	109,342	1,503 mi^{2} (3,890 km^{2})	18	1984
8	Lofa	Voinjama	367,376	3,854 mi^{2} (9,980 km^{2})	6	1964
9	Margibi	Kakata	304,946	1,010 mi^{2} (2,600 km^{2})	4	1985
10	Maryland	Harper	172,202	886 mi^{2} (2,290 km^{2})	2	1857
11	Montserrado	Bensonville	1,920,914	737 mi^{2} (1,910 km^{2})	17	1839
12	Nimba	Sanniquellie	621,841	4,459 mi^{2} (11,550 km^{2})	6	1964
13	Rivercess	River Cess	90,777	2,159 mi^{2} (5,590 km^{2})	7	1985
14	River Gee	Fish Town	124,653	1,974 mi^{2} (5,110 km^{2})	6	2000
15	Sinoe	Greenville	150,358	3,913 mi^{2} (10,130 km^{2})	17	1843

== Government and politics ==
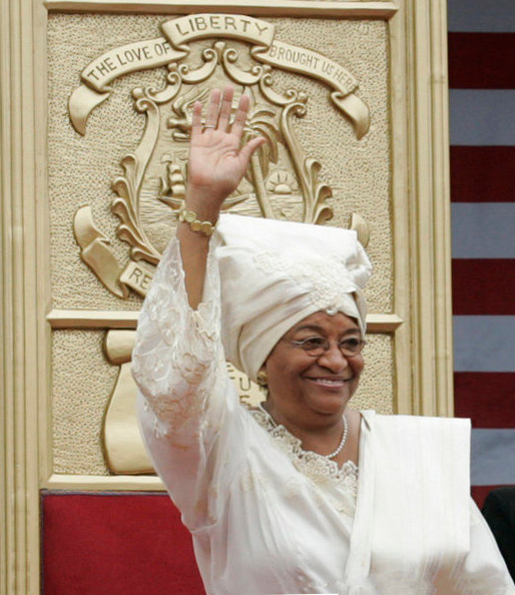
Former President Ellen Johnson Sirleaf

The government of Liberia, modeled on the government of the United States, is a unitary constitutional republic and representative democracy as established by the Constitution. The government has three co-equal branches of government: the executive, headed by the president; the legislative, consisting of the bicameral Legislature of Liberia; and the judicial, consisting of the Supreme Court and several lower courts.

The president serves as head of government, head of state, and the commander-in-chief of the Armed Forces of Liberia. Among the president's other duties are to sign or veto legislative bills, grant pardons, and appoint Cabinet members, judges, and other public officials. Together with the vice president, the president is elected to a six-year term by majority vote in a two-round system and can serve up to two terms in office.

The Legislature is composed of the Senate and the House of Representatives. The House, led by a speaker, has 73 members apportioned among the 15 counties on the basis of the national census, with each county receiving a minimum of two members. Each House member represents an electoral district within a county as drawn by the National Elections Commission and is elected by a plurality of the popular vote of their district into a six-year term. The Senate is made up of two senators from each county for a total of 30 senators. Senators serve nine-year terms and are elected at-large by a plurality of the popular vote. The vice president serves as the President of the Senate, with a President pro tempore serving in their absence.

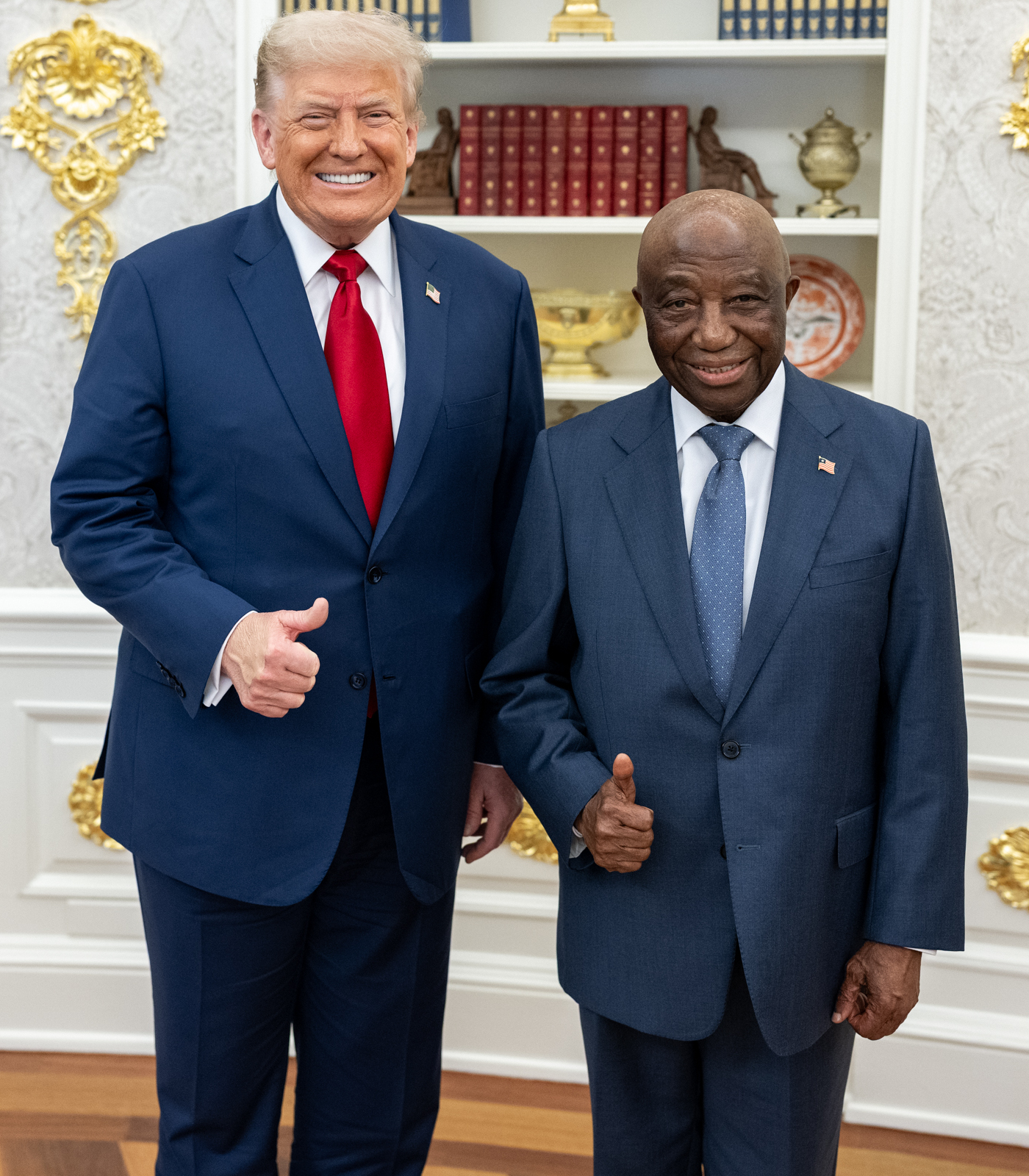
Liberian President Joseph Boakai with U.S. President Donald Trump on July 9, 2025

Liberia's highest judicial authority is the Supreme Court, made up of five members and headed by the Chief Justice of Liberia. Members are nominated to the court by the president and are confirmed by the Senate, serving until the age of 70. The judiciary is further divided into circuit and speciality courts, magistrate courts, and justices of the peace. The judicial system is a blend of common law, based on Anglo-American law, and customary law. An informal system of traditional courts still exists within the rural areas of the country, with trial by ordeal remaining common despite being officially outlawed.

From 1877 to 1980, the government was dominated by the True Whig Party. In 2011, over 20 political parties were registered in Liberia, based largely around personalities and ethnic groups. Most parties suffered from poor organizational capacity in 2011. The 2005 elections marked the first time that the president's party did not gain a majority of seats in the Legislature. According to 2023 V-Dem Democracy indices Liberia is ranked 65th electoral democracy worldwide and 9th electoral democracy in Africa.

=== Military ===
Members of the Liberian National Guard at the inauguration of President William Tolbert in 1976

The Armed Forces of Liberia (AFL) have 2,010 active personnel as of 2023, with most of them organized into the 23rd Infantry Brigade, consisting of two infantry battalions, one engineer company, and one military police company. There is also a small National Coast Guard with 60 personnel and several patrol ships. The AFL used to have an Air Wing, but all of its aircraft and facilities have been out of operation since the civil wars. It is in the process of reactivating its Air Wing with help from the Nigerian Air Force. Liberia has deployed peacekeepers to other countries since 2013 as part of UN or ECOWAS missions, with the largest being an infantry unit in Mali, and smaller numbers of personnel in Sudan, Guinea-Bissau, and South Sudan. About 800 of the AFL's 2,000 personnel have been deployed to Mali in several rotations before the UN mission there ended in December 2023. In 2022 the country had a military budget of US$18.7 million.

The old military was disbanded after the civil wars and entirely rebuilt, starting in 2005, with assistance and funding from the United States. The military assistance program, which became known as Operation Onward Liberty in 2010, provided training with the goal of making the AFL into an apolitical and professional military. The operation ended in 2016, though the Michigan National Guard still continues to work with the AFL as part of the U.S. National Guard's State Partnership Program.

=== Foreign relations ===
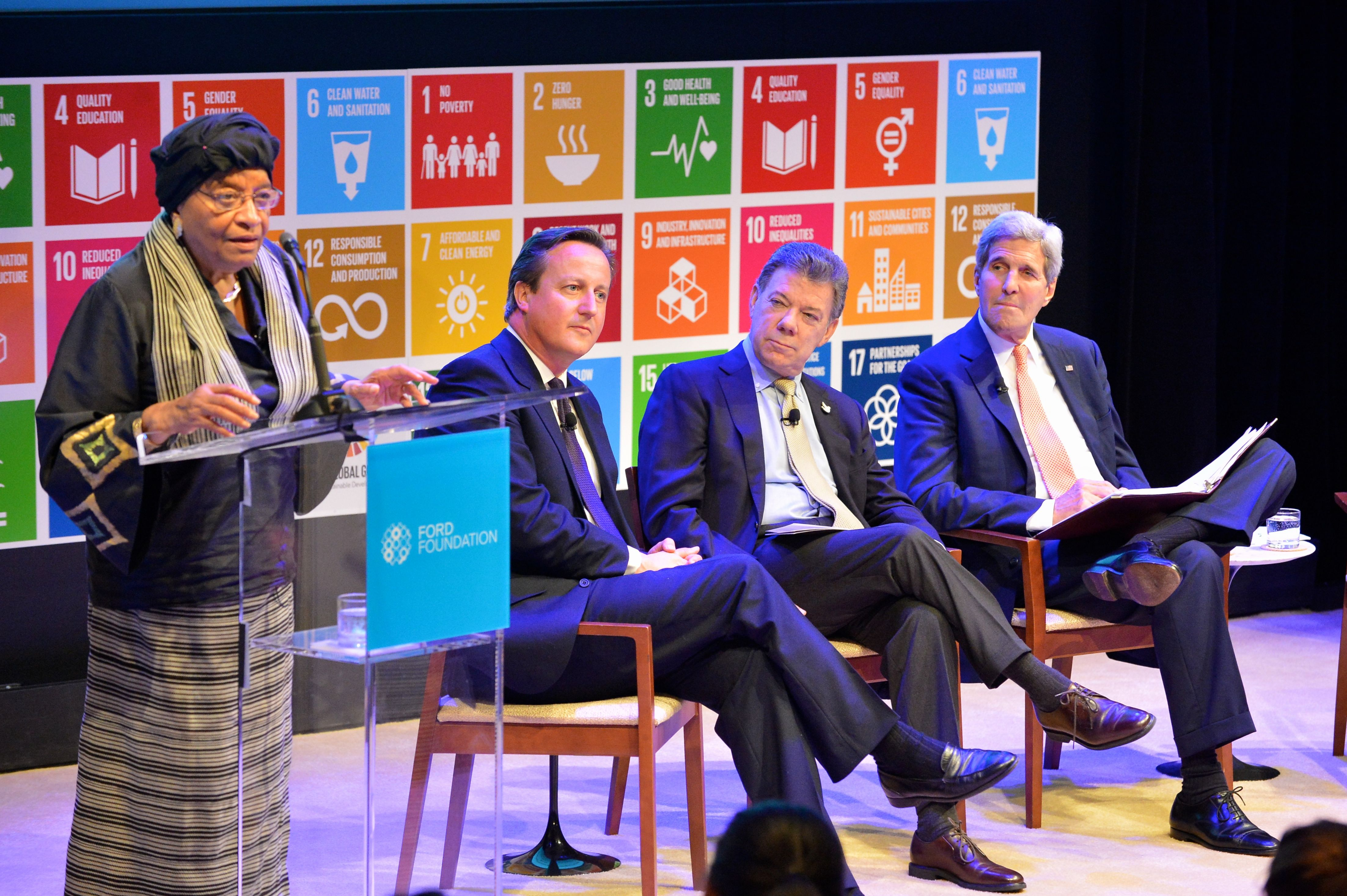
President Sirleaf with (left to right) British Prime Minister David Cameron, Colombian President Juan Manuel Santos, and United States Secretary of State John Kerry in September 2015

After the turmoil following the First and Second Liberian Civil Wars, Liberia's internal stabilization in the 21st century brought a return to cordial relations with neighboring countries and much of the Western world. As in other African countries, China is an important part of the post-conflict reconstruction.

In the past, both of Liberia's neighbors, Guinea and Sierra Leone, have accused Liberia of backing rebels in their countries.

=== Law enforcement and crime ===
The Liberian National Police is the country's national police force. As of October 2007 it has 844 officers in 33 stations in Montserrado County, which contains Monrovia. The National Police Training Academy is in Paynesville City. A history of corruption among police officers diminishes public trust and operational effectiveness. The internal security is characterized by a general lawlessness coupled with the danger that former combatants in the late civil war might reestablish militias to challenge the civil authorities.

Rape and sexual assault are frequent in the post-conflict era in Liberia. Liberia has one of the highest incidences of sexual violence against women in the world. Rape is the most frequently reported crime, accounting for more than one-third of sexual violence cases. Adolescent girls are the most frequently assaulted, and almost 40% of perpetrators are adult men known to victims. The sexual scandal involving Katie Meyler's More Than Me Foundation (MTMF) in Liberia was a major international incident that led to the collapse of the highly regarded organization.

Both male and female homosexuality are illegal in Liberia. On July 20, 2012, the Liberian senate voted unanimously to enact legislation to prohibit and criminalize same-sex marriages.

=== Corruption ===
Corruption is endemic at every level of the Liberian government. When President Sirleaf took office in 2006, she announced that corruption was "the major public enemy." In 2014, the US ambassador to Liberia said that corruption there was harming people through "unnecessary costs to products and services that are already difficult for many Liberians to afford".

As of 2010, Liberia was one of the most politically corrupt nations in the world. This score represented a significant improvement since 2007, when the country scored 2.1 and ranked 150th of 180 countries. When dealing with public-facing government functionaries, 89% of Liberians say they have had to pay a bribe, the highest national percentage in the world according to the organization's 2010 Global Corruption Barometer.

== Economy ==
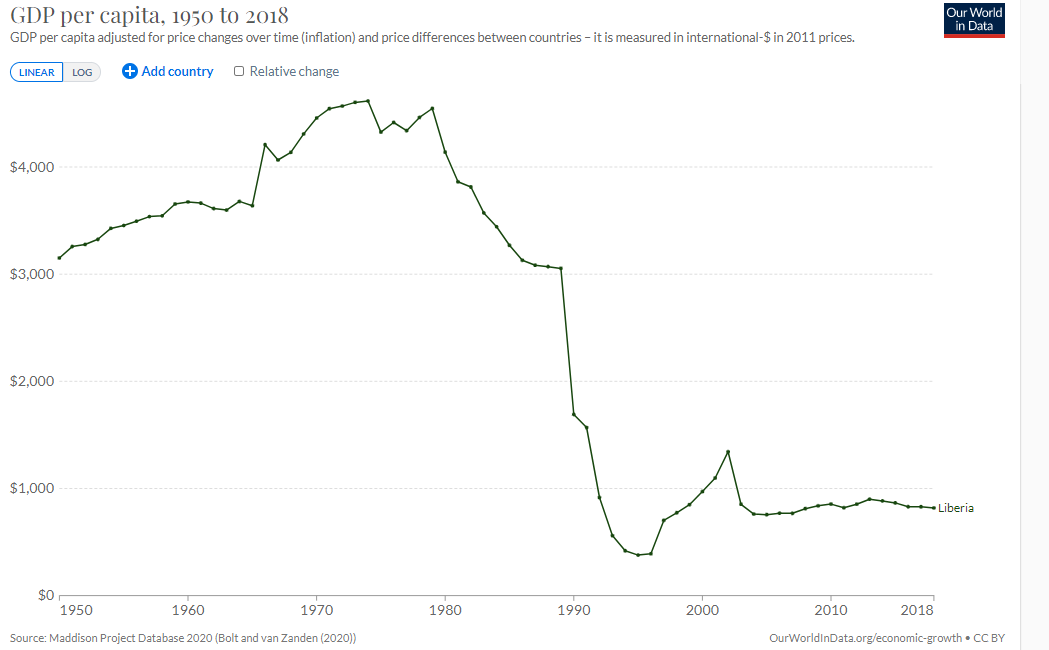
Real GDP per capita development, since 1950

The Central Bank of Liberia is responsible for printing and maintaining the Liberian dollar, Liberia's primary currency (the United States dollar is also legal tender in Liberia). Liberia is one of the world's poorest countries, with a formal employment rate of 15%. GDP per capita peaked in 1980 at US$496, (~$1,938 in 2025) when it was comparable to Egypt's (at the time). In 2011, the country's nominal GDP was US$1.154 billion, while nominal GDP per capita stood at US$297, the third-lowest in the world. Historically the Liberian economy has depended heavily on foreign aid, foreign direct investment and exports of natural resources such as iron ore, rubber, and timber.

=== Trends ===
Following a peak in growth in 1979, the Liberian economy began a steady decline due to economic mismanagement after the 1980 coup. This decline was accelerated by the outbreak of civil war in 1989; GDP was reduced by an estimated 90% between 1989 and 1995, one of the fastest declines in modern history. Upon the end of the war in 2003, GDP growth began to accelerate, reaching 9.4% in 2007. In 2009, during the Great Recession GDP growth slowed to 4.6%, though a strengthening agricultural sector led by rubber and timber exports increased growth to 5.1% in 2010 and an expected 7.3% in 2011, making the economy one of the 20 fastest-growing in the world.

Current impediments to growth include a small domestic market, lack of adequate infrastructure, high transportation costs, poor trade links with neighboring countries, and the high dollarization of the economy. Liberia used the United States dollar as its currency from 1943 until 1982 and continues to use the U.S. dollar alongside the Liberian dollar.

Following a decrease in inflation beginning in 2003, inflation spiked in 2008 as a result of worldwide food and energy crises, reaching 17.5% before declining to 7.4% in 2009. Liberia's external debt was estimated in 2006 at approximately $4.5 billion, 800% of GDP. As a result of bilateral, multilateral and commercial debt relief from 2007 to 2010, the country's external debt fell to $222.9 million by 2011.

While official commodity exports declined during the 1990s as many investors fled the civil war, Liberia's wartime economy featured the exploitation of the region's diamond wealth. The country acted as a major trader in Sierra Leonian blood diamonds, exporting over US$300 million (~$544 million in 2025) in diamonds in 1999. This led to a United Nations ban on Liberian diamond exports in 2001, which was lifted in 2007 following Liberia's accession to the Kimberley Process Certification Scheme.

In 2003, additional UN sanctions were placed on Liberian timber exports, which had risen from US$5 million in 1997 to over US$100 million in 2002 and were believed to be funding rebels in Sierra Leone. These sanctions were lifted in 2006. Due in large part to foreign aid and investment inflow following the end of the war, Liberia maintains a large account deficit, which peaked at nearly 60% in 2008. Liberia gained observer status with the World Trade Organization in 2010 and became an official member in 2016.

Liberia has the highest ratio of foreign direct investment to GDP in the world, with US$16 billion (~$24.5 billion in 2025) in investment since 2006. Following Sirleaf's inauguration in 2006, Liberia signed several multi-billion-dollar concession agreements in the iron ore and palm oil industries with numerous multinational corporations, including ArcelorMittal, BHP and Sime Darby. Palm oil companies like Sime Darby (Malaysia) and Golden Veroleum (USA) have been accused of destroying livelihoods and displacing local communities, enabled by government concessions. Since 1926 Firestone has operated the world's largest rubber plantation in Harbel, Margibi County. As of 2015, it had more than 8,000 mostly Liberian employees, making it the country's largest private employer.

In September 2024 the International Monetary Fund (IMF) announced that its executive board approved a financial arrangement of approximately $210 million for Liberia. The approval includes an immediate disbursement of around $8 million. This arrangement is aimed at supporting Liberia's economic recovery and addressing fiscal challenges.

=== Shipping flag of convenience ===
Due to its status as a flag of convenience, Liberia has the largest maritime registry in the world. At the beginning of 2026, Liberia had 5,846 registered merchant vessels and accounted for 17.66% of the global registered fleet.

=== Major industries ===
==== Agriculture ====
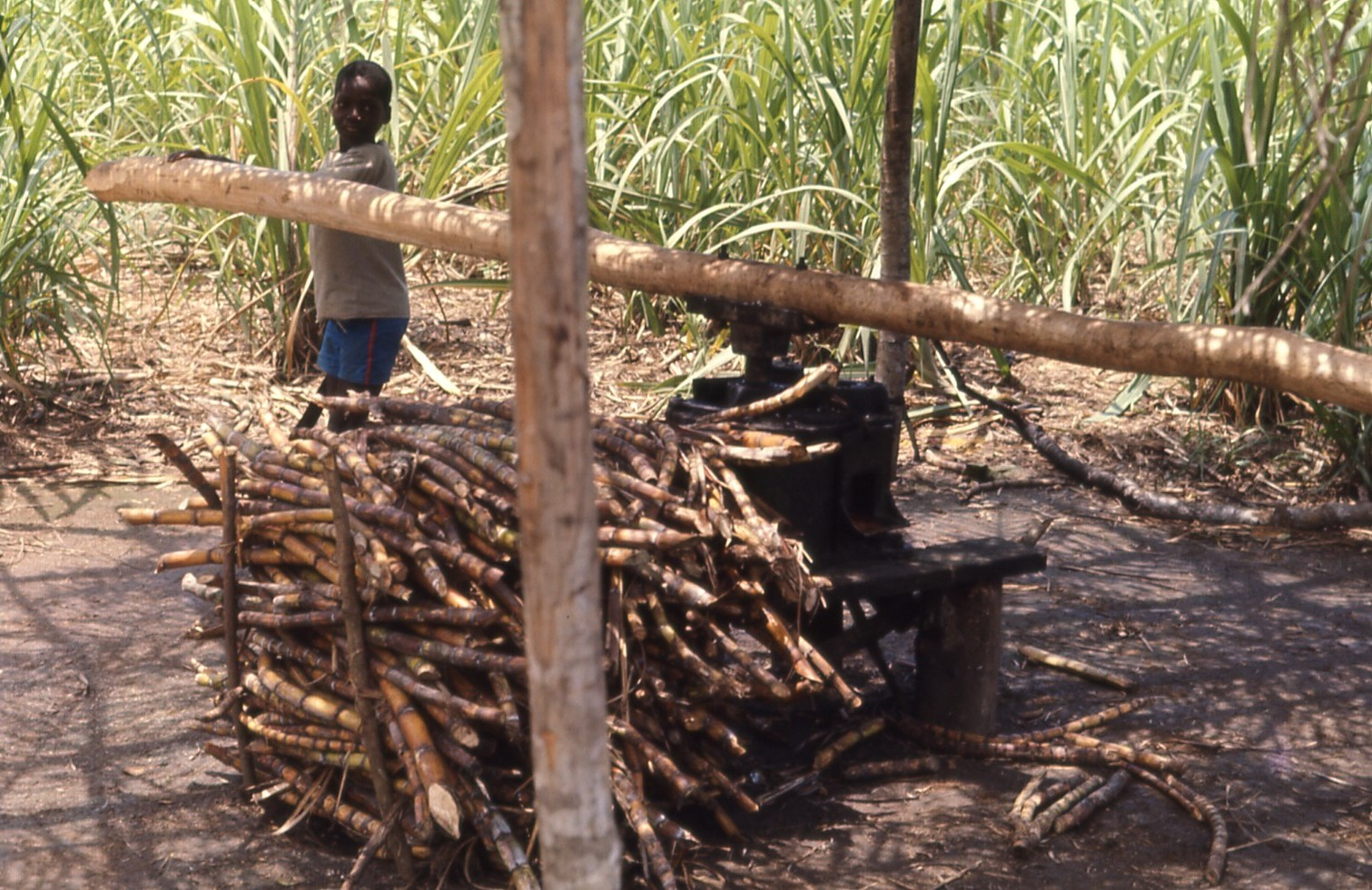
Young boy grinding sugar cane near Flumpa, Nimba County, 1968

Agriculture in Liberia is a major sector of the country's economy worth 38.8% of GDP, employing more than 70% of the population and providing a valuable export for one of the world's least developed countries (as defined by the UN). Liberia has a climate favourable to farming, vast forests, and an abundance of water, yet low yields mean that over half of foodstuffs are imported, with net agricultural trade at -$73.12 million in 2010. This was dismissed as a "misconception" by Liberia's Minister of Agriculture.

The major crops are natural rubber, rice, cassava, bananas and palm oil. Timber is also a major export at $100 million annually, although much of this is the product of unsustainable habitat destruction, with Asian corporations criticised for their role. Although agricultural activity occurs in most rural locations, it is particularly concentrated in coastal plains (subsistence crops) and tropical forest (cash crops). The sector is very important for women as they are widely employed in it in comparison to the economy as a whole.

Sustenance farming is popular in many areas of Liberia. Communities primarily grow upland rice, cassava, and vegetables, though cane sugar distillation and coal mining provide job opportunity diversification.

Traditional farming systems, such as intercropping and agroforestry encourage biodiversity. These farming practices have been shown to increase the resilience of food production and alleviate reduction in access to wild foods associated with the loss of forests. However, continued acquisition of land by palm oil and rubber plantations reduces household access to land, food, and water.

Palm oil production is also a large part of Liberian agriculture and is largely controlled by the Malaysian palm oil company, Sime Darby. In 2009, Liberia granted one of its largest concessions to Sime Darby, despite local and international concern over the environmental impacts this could cause. Liberia, which has one of the highest rates of unemployment in the world, was promised employment of roughly 30,000 by Sime Darby for palm oil production. Palm oil production is expected to increase as global demand for palm oil for food and biofuel increases. Rubber production in Liberia is mostly done through plantations and industrial agriculture. These industries can cause deforestation and have been shown to decrease the amount of land owned by locals according to a study done by the Cornell Land Project. They can also decrease local incomes by taking away the ability of locals to hunt for and trade bushmeat or grow crops to sell.

==== Mining ====
Between 1960 and 1980, iron ore mining was the mainstay of the Liberian economy, contributing to more than 60 percent of export earnings. This came after former United States president Harry S. Truman encouraged foreign investment, leading some foreign companies to invest in Liberia's mining sector. During this time, much of the mining done in Liberia was carried out by alluvial mining of small-scale operations, with estimates of over 100,000 artisanal miners in Liberia. However, with the onset of Liberia's first civil war, much of the country's productive infrastructure was destroyed and mining was brought to a virtual halt. The commencement of Liberia's second civil war aggravated this trend.

After the end of Liberia's second civil war, there was a sharp post-conflict increase in mining activities, rapid settlement expansion and increasing forest loss. This increased mining activity and associated forest loss threatens biodiversity, increases pressure on available agricultural land, especially land meant for sustenance agriculture, and increases potential exposure of the Liberian population to pollution from mining activities. Many of these iron and gold ore corporations which are increasingly dominating the Liberian economy are geared to satisfy the needs of the metropolitan economies and not the needs of the Liberian economy. This has led to the formation of economic islands which fail to have any "developing effect" on the economy as a whole. ^{[237]} Despite the stronger economic linkages artisanal mines have to local communities, investment in industrial mining by foreign companies has increased in post-conflict Liberia due to larger taxes and royalty payments received from industrial mines.

Liberian mining has also been shown to have negative effects on the Liberian environment. Post conflict mining has contributed to an increase in forest loss and air pollution. Though Liberia does possess environmental management tools such as the Environmental Impact Assessment (EIA) and Environmental Impact Statement (EIS), use of these tools and environmentally protective policy is still lacking. Harnessing of best practices in regards to agriculture and mining and valorizing local knowledge has been shown to be inadequate, meaning pressure on the environment is still heavy. Liberia's mining industry also impacts food and water availability for many Liberian peoples, impacting household nutrition and income levels.

Mining labor in Liberia has faced criticism from civil society groups and, notably, Joshua Obediah Zaza Arku, Inspector-General of Liberia's Mines and Energy Ministry'. Aside from long hours and low wages, resistance movements and unions have been squashed by corporate and government entities, leading to outrage of the Liberian working class. On November 23, 1976, workers at the depleted iron ore mines at Bomi Hills went on strike demanding that, prior to the mine's closing, they should be paid two months wage for each year they worked with the company. News reporters on the scene described random arrests and undue violence towards workers on strike. Many other instances of violence against laborers and the working class in Liberia have been recorded.^{[237]} Liberia has seen many protests in its mining sector, mostly over poor working conditions and a perceived apathy towards the Liberian peoples. Some of the protests, such as the March 1, 2024, protest at Kinjor, have resulted in injuries and even deaths of Liberian miners. Protests and resistance continue today over poor working and living conditions.

Gold, diamonds, and iron ore form the core minerals of the mining sector with a new Mineral Development Policy and Mining Code being put in place to attract foreign investments. In 2013, the mineral sector accounted for 11% of GDP in the country and the World Bank projected a further increase in the sector by 2017.

Telecommunications

There are six major newspapers in Liberia, and 65% of the population has a mobile phone service. Much of Liberia's communications infrastructure was destroyed or plundered during the two civil wars (1989–1996 and 1999–2003). With low rates of adult literacy and high poverty rates, television and newspaper use is limited, leaving radio as the predominant means of communicating with the public.

==== Transportation ====
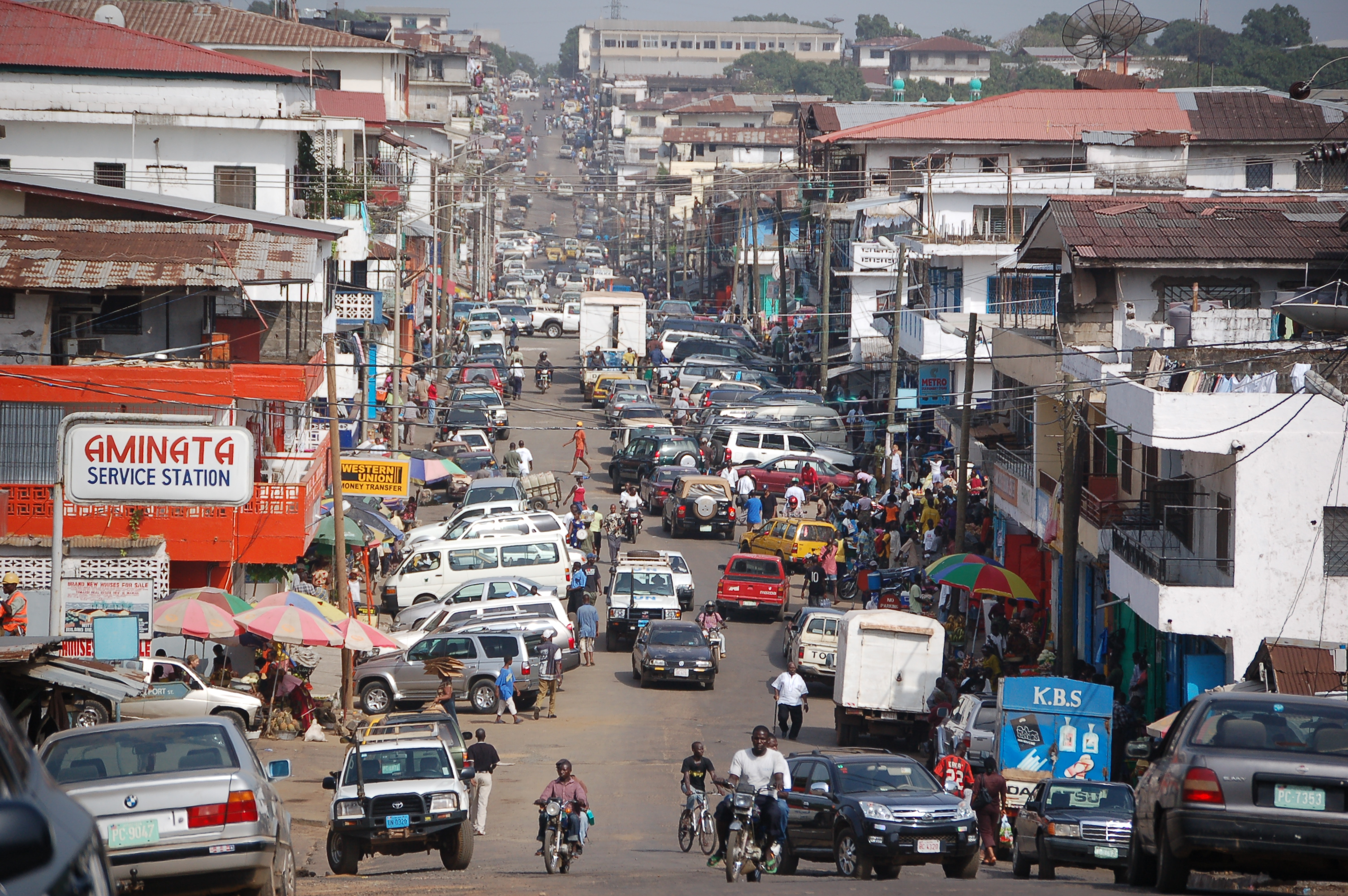
The streets of downtown Monrovia, March 2009

Transport in Liberia consists of 243 km (151 miles) of railways, 6,580 miles of highways (408 mi paved), seaports, 29 airports (2 paved) and 2 miles of pipeline for oil transportation. Railroads are almost exclusively for cargo. Buses and taxis are the main forms of ground transportation in and around Monrovia. Charter boats and ferries are also available.

==== Energy ====
Public electricity services are provided solely by the state-owned Liberia Electricity Corporation, which operates a small grid almost exclusively in the Greater Monrovia District. The vast majority of electric energy services is provided by small, privately owned generators. At $0.54 per kWh in 2013, the cost of electricity in Liberia was among the highest in the world at the time. Total capacity in 2013 was 20 MW, a sharp decline from a peak of 191 MW in 1989 before the wars.

The repair and expansion of the Mount Coffee Hydropower Project, with a maximum capacity of 80 MW, was completed in 2018. Construction of three new heavy fuel oil power plants is expected to boost electrical capacity by 38 MW. In 2013, Liberia began importing power from neighboring Ivory Coast and Guinea through the West African Power Pool.

Liberia has begun exploration for offshore oil; unproven oil reserves may be in excess of one billion barrels. The government divided its offshore waters into 17 blocks and began auctioning off exploration licenses for the blocks in 2004, with further auctions in 2007 and 2009. An additional 13 ultra-deep offshore blocks were demarcated in 2011 and planned for auction. Among the companies to have won licenses are Repsol YPF, Chevron Corporation and Woodside Energy.

== Demographics ==
As of the 2017 national census, Liberia was home to 4,694,608 people. Of those, 1,118,241 lived in Montserrado County, the most populous county in the country and location of the capital Monrovia. The Greater Monrovia District has 970,824 residents. Nimba County is the next most populous county, with 462,026 residents. As revealed in the 2008 census, Monrovia is a primate city, being over four times more populous than all county capitals combined.

Prior to the 2008 census, the last census had been taken in 1984 and listed the country's population as 2,101,628. The population of Liberia was 1,016,443 in 1962 and increased to 1,503,368 in 1974. As of 2006, Liberia had the highest population growth rate in the world (4.50% per annum). In 2010 some 43.5% of Liberians were below the age of 15.

Largest cities or towns in Liberia According to the 2008 Census
Rank	Name	County	Pop.
1	Monrovia	Montserrado	1,021,762
2	Gbarnga	Bong	56,986
3	Buchanan	Grand Bassa	50,245
4	Ganta	Nimba	42,077
5	Kakata	Margibi	34,608
6	Zwedru	Grand Gedeh	25,349
7	Harbel	Margibi	25,309
8	Harper	Maryland	23,517
9	Pleebo	Maryland	23,464
10	Foya	Lofa	20,569

=== Ethnic groups ===
Ethnic groups in Liberia
Ethnic groups	Percent
Kpelle	20.3%
Bassa	13.4%
Grebo	10.0%
Gio (Dan)	8.0%
Mano	7.9%
Kru (Klao)	6.0%
Lorma	5.1%
Kissi	4.8%
Gola	4.4%
Krahn	4.0%
Vai	4.0%
Mandinka	3.2%
Gbandi	3.0%
Mende	1.3%
Sapo	1.2%
Belle	0.8%
Dey (Dewoin)	0.3%
Other Liberian	0.6%
Other African	1.4%
Non African	0.1%

The population includes 16 indigenous ethnic groups and various foreign minorities. Indigenous peoples comprise about 95 percent of the population. The 16 officially recognized ethnic groups include the Kpelle, Bassa, Mano, Gio or Dan, Kru, Grebo, Krahn, Vai, Gola, Mandingo or Mandinka, Mende, Kissi, Gbandi, Loma, Dei or Dewoin, and Belleh. The Americo-Liberians, or Congo people, (Note: So named because many immigrants including those freed from slave ships arrived from ports at the mouth of the Congo River.) are a historical community in Liberia.

The Kpelle comprise more than 20% of the population and are the largest ethnic group in Liberia, residing mostly in Bong County and adjacent areas in central Liberia. Americo-Liberians, who are descendants of African American and West Indian, mostly Barbadian (Bajan) settlers, make up 2.5%. Congo people, descendants of repatriated Congo and Afro-Caribbean slaves who arrived in 1825, make up an estimated 2.5%. These latter two groups established political control in the 19th century which they kept well into the 20th century.

The Liberian constitution exercises jus sanguinis, which means it usually restricts its citizenship to "Negroes or persons of Negro descent." That being said, numerous immigrants have come as merchants and become a major part of the business community, including Lebanese, Indians, and other West African nationals. There is a high prevalence of interracial marriage between ethnic Liberians and the Lebanese, resulting in a significant mixed-race population especially in and around Monrovia. A small minority of Liberians who are White Africans of European descent reside in the country.

=== Languages ===
English is the official language and serves as the lingua franca of Liberia. 27 indigenous languages are spoken in Liberia, but each is a first language for only a small percentage of the population. Liberians also speak a variety of creolized dialects collectively known as Liberian English.

The native Niger–Congo languages can be grouped in four language families: Mande, Kru, Mel, and the divergent language Grebo. Kpelle-speaking people are the largest single linguistic group.

=== Religion ===
Religion in Liberia (2010)
Religion	Percent
Protestantism	76.3%
Islam	12.2%
Roman Catholicism	7.2%
Other Christian	1.6%
Unaffiliated	1.4%
Other faith	1.3%

According to the 2008 National Census, 85.6% of the population practiced Christianity, while Muslims represented a minority of 12.2%. A multitude of diverse Protestant confessions such as Lutheran, Baptist, Episcopal, Presbyterian, Pentecostal, United Methodist, African Methodist Episcopal (AME) and African Methodist Episcopal Zion (AME Zion) denominations form the bulk of the Christian population, followed by adherents of the Catholic Church and other non-Protestant Christians. Most of these Christian denominations were brought by African-American settlers moving from the United States into Liberia via the American Colonization Society in the 19th century, while others appeared later in the 20th century—especially Pentecostal and evangelical Protestant ones. Protestantism was originally associated with Black American settlers and their Americo-Liberian descendants, while native peoples initially held to their own animist forms of African traditional religion before largely adopting Christianity. While Christian, many Liberians also participate in traditional, gender-based indigenous religious secret societies, such as Poro for men and Sande for women. The all-female Sande society practices female circumcision.

Muslims comprised 12.2% of the population in 2008, largely represented by the Mandingo and Vai ethnic groups. Liberian Muslims are divided between Sunnis, Shias, Ahmadiyyas, Sufis, and non-denominational Muslims.

In 2008, 0.5% identified adherence to traditional indigenous religions, while 1.5% claimed no religion. A small number of people were Baháʼí, Hindu, Sikh, or Buddhist.

The Liberian constitution provides for freedom of religion, and the government generally respects this right. While separation of church and state is mandated by the Constitution, Liberia is considered a Christian state in practice. Public schools offer biblical studies, though parents may opt their children out. Commerce is prohibited by law on Sunday and major Christian holidays. The government does not require businesses or schools to excuse Muslims for Friday prayers.

=== Education ===
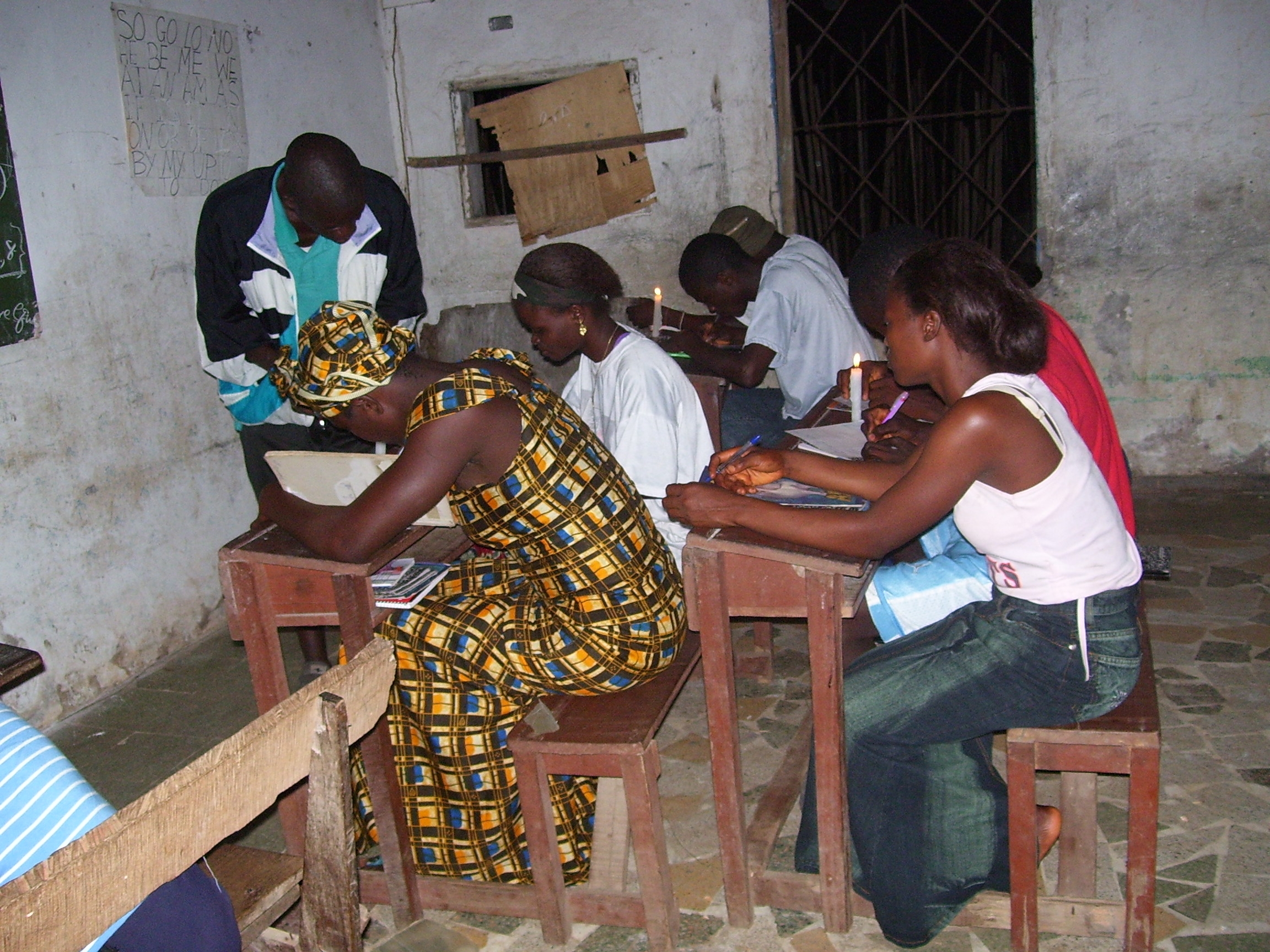
Students studying by candlelight in Bong County

In 2010, the literacy rate of Liberia was estimated at 60.8% (64.8% for males and 56.8% for females). In some areas primary and secondary education is free and compulsory from the ages of 6 to 16, though enforcement of attendance is lax. In other areas children are required to pay a tuition fee to attend school. On average, children attain 10 years of education (11 for boys and 8 for girls). The country's education sector is hampered by inadequate schools and supplies, as well as a lack of qualified teachers.

Higher education is provided by a number of public and private universities. The University of Liberia is the country's largest and oldest university. Located in Monrovia, the university opened in 1862. Today it has six colleges, including a medical school and the nation's only law school, Louis Arthur Grimes School of Law.

In 2009, Tubman University in Harper, Maryland County, was established as the second public university in Liberia. Since 2006, the government has also opened community colleges in Buchanan, Sanniquellie, and Voinjama.

Due to student protests late in October 2018, newly elected president George Weah abolished tuition fees for undergraduate students in public universities in Liberia.

=== Health ===
Development of life expectancy

Hospitals in Liberia include the John F. Kennedy Medical Center in Monrovia and several others. Life expectancy in Liberia is estimated to be 64.4 years in 2020. With a fertility rate of 5.9 births per woman, the maternal mortality rate stood at 990 per 100,000 births in 2010, and 1,072 per 100,000 births in 2017. A number of highly communicable diseases are widespread, including tuberculosis, diarrheal diseases and malaria. In 2007, the HIV infection rates stood at 2% of the population aged 15–49 whereas the incidence of tuberculosis was 420 per 100,000 people in 2008. Approximately 58.2%–66% of women are estimated to have undergone female genital mutilation.

Liberia imports 90% of its rice, a staple food, and is extremely vulnerable to food shortages. In 2007, 20.4% of children under the age of five were malnourished. Liberia has a high level of hunger and food insecurity.

Approximately 95% of the country's healthcare facilities had been destroyed by the time civil war ended in 2003. In 2009, government expenditure on health care per capita was US$22, (~$32.00 in 2025) accounting for 10.6% of total GDP. In 2008, Liberia had only one doctor and 27 nurses per 100,000 people.

In 2014, an outbreak of Ebola virus in Guinea spread to Liberia. As of November 17, 2014, there were 2,812 confirmed deaths from the ongoing outbreak.

According to Liberia’s 2025 Comprehensive Food Security and Nutrition Survey, only 2.4% of children aged 6–23 months receive a minimum acceptable diet, while 8.5% of children under five suffer from global acute malnutrition.

== Culture ==
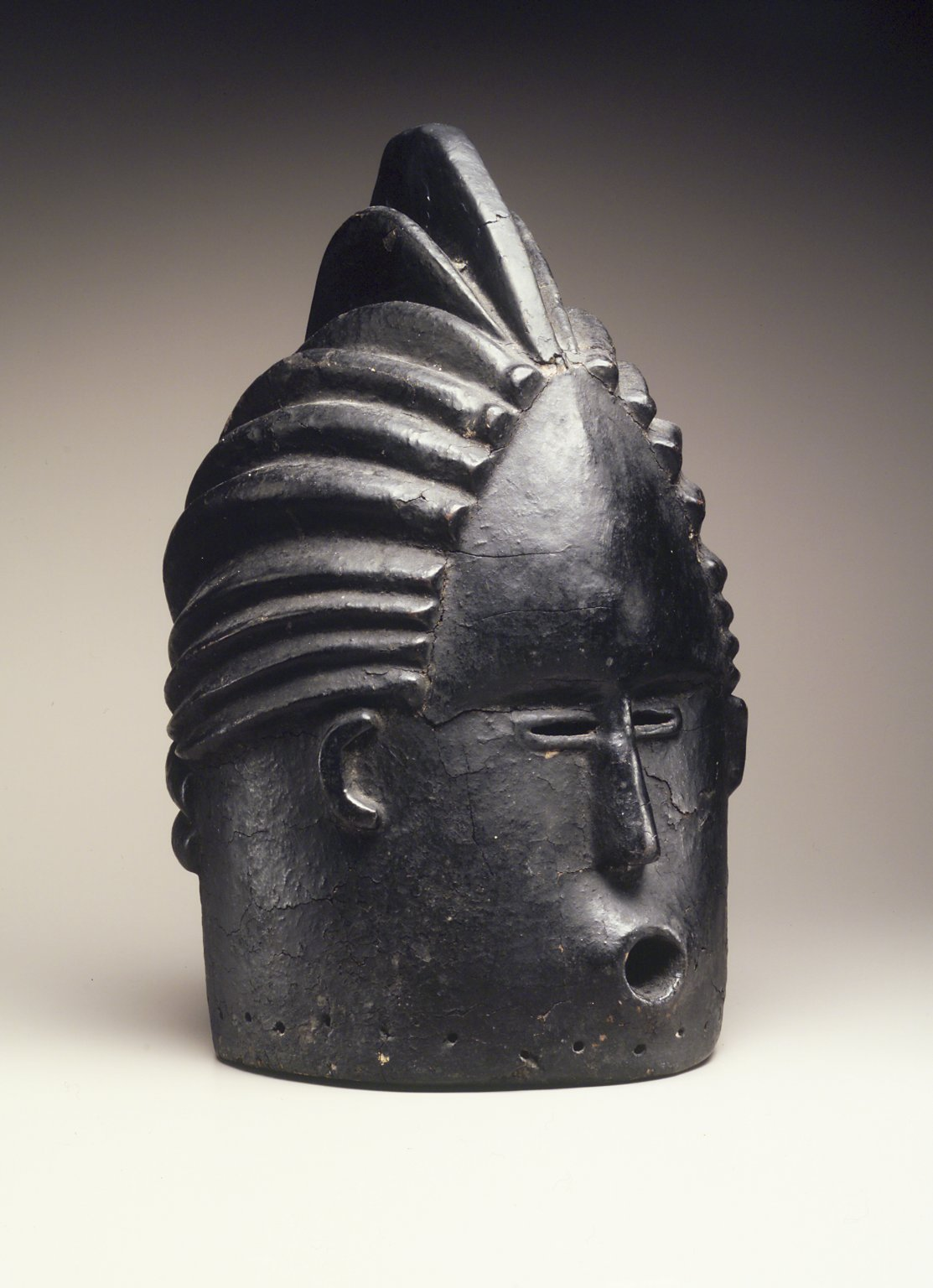
Bassa culture. Helmet Mask for Sande Society (Ndoli Jowei), Liberia. 20th century. Brooklyn Museum.

The religious practices, social customs, and cultural standards of the Americo-Liberians had their roots in the antebellum American South. The settlers wore top hat and tails and modeled their homes on those of Southern slaveowners. Most Americo-Liberian men were members of the Masonic Order of Liberia, which became heavily involved in the nation's politics.

Liberia has a rich history in textile arts and quilting, as the settlers brought with them their sewing and quilting skills. Liberia hosted National Fairs in 1857 and 1858 in which prizes were awarded for various needle arts. One of the most well-known Liberian quilters was Martha Ann Ricks, who presented a quilt featuring the famed Liberian coffee tree to Queen Victoria in 1892. When President Ellen Johnson Sirleaf moved into the Executive Mansion, she reportedly had a Liberian-made quilt installed in her presidential office.

Edward Wilmot Blyden, Bai T. Moore, Roland T. Dempster and Wilton G. S. Sankawulo are among Liberia's more prominent authors. Moore's novella Murder in the Cassava Patch is considered Liberia's most celebrated novel.

=== Polygamy ===
One-third of married Liberian women between the ages of 15 and 49 are in polygamous marriages. Customary law allows men to have up to four wives.

=== Cuisine ===
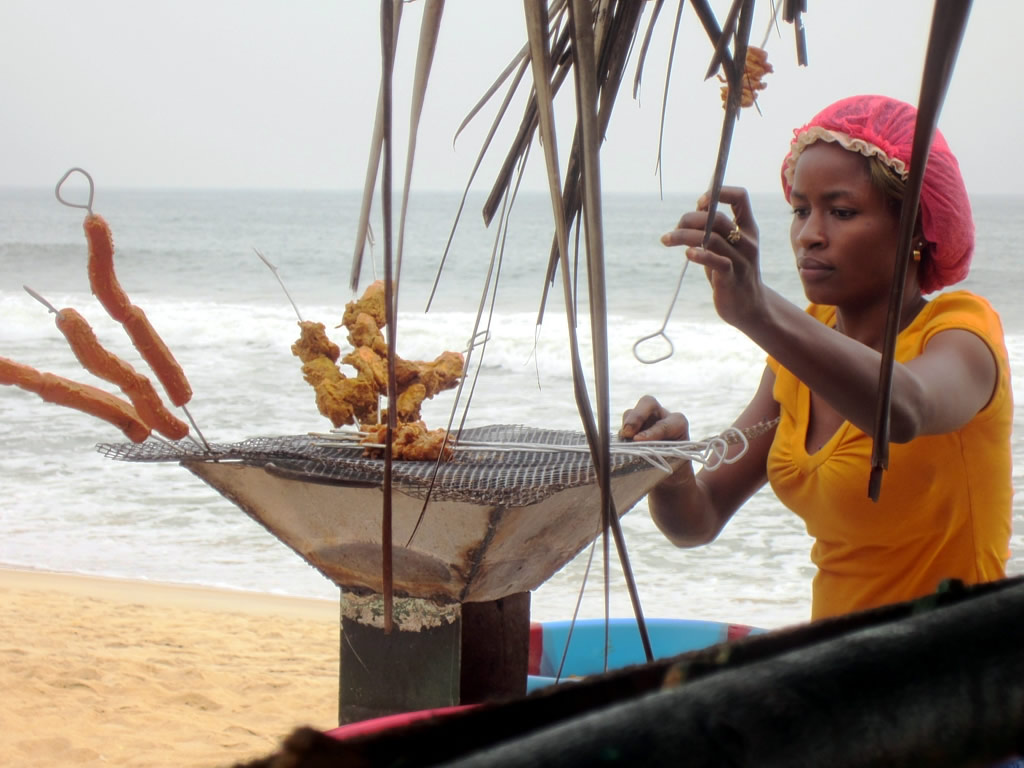
A beachside barbecue at Sinkor, Monrovia, Liberia

Liberian cuisine heavily incorporates rice, the country's staple food. Other ingredients include cassava, fish, bananas, citrus fruit, plantains, coconut, okra and sweet potatoes. Heavy stews spiced with habanero and scotch bonnet chilies are popular and eaten with fufu. Liberia also has a tradition of baking imported from the United States that is unique in West Africa.

=== Sport ===
The most popular sport in Liberia is association football, with former president George Weah being the nation's most famous athlete. He is so far the only African to be named FIFA World Player of the Year. The Liberia national football team has reached the Africa Cup of Nations finals twice, in 1996 and 2002.

The second most popular sport in Liberia is basketball. The Liberian national basketball team has reached the AfroBasket twice, in 1983 and 2007.

In Liberia, the Samuel Kanyon Doe Sports Complex serves as a multi-purpose stadium. It hosts FIFA World Cup qualifying matches in addition to international concerts and national political events.

=== Measurement system ===
Liberia has not yet completely adopted the International System of Units (abbreviated as the SI, also called the metric system). The Liberian government has begun transitioning away from use of United States customary units to the metric system. This change has been gradual, with government reports concurrently using United States Customary and metric units. In 2018, the Liberian Commerce and Industry Minister announced that the Liberian government is committed to adopting the metric system.

== See also ==
- Outline of Liberia
- Gender inequality in Liberia
