= Bong mine =

Iron ore mine in Bong County, Liberia

Location
- Location: Bong County, Liberia

Production
- Products: Iron ore

History
- Opened: 2013

The Bong mine is a large iron mine located in central Liberia in Bong County. Bong represents one of the largest iron ore reserves in Liberia and in the world having estimated reserves of 4 billion tonnes of ore grading 36% iron metal.

A railway connects the mine to the capital city, Monrovia. The Bong mine railway was damaged during the civil war, and reopened in 2009.
