= Kobazzie =

Liberian singer (born 1989)

- Born: Korte Dorbor Bazzie; November 29, 1989 (age 36); Voinjama, Lofa County, Liberia
- Genres: Afropop; Afrobeats
- Occupations: Singer; songwriter
- Instrument: Vocals
- Years active: 2016–present

Korte Dorbor Bazzie (born November 29, 1989), known professionally as Kobazzie, is a Liberian singer and songwriter from Voinjama, Lofa County. He was inspired to pursue a career in music after listening to "State of Emergency", a track jointly recorded by Quincy B and Tan Tan B. Kobazzie is the recipient of several accolades, including New Artist of the Year at the 2016 Liberia Music Awards and Afropop Artist of the Year at the 2019 Tunes Liberia Music Awards.

== Early life and career ==
=== 1989–2020: Early life, career beginnings, and music releases ===
Korte Dorbor Bazzie was born on November 29, 1989, in Voinjama, Lofa County. He relocated to Monrovia to further his education and graduated from St. Michael Catholic School. He studied accounting and business management at Cuttington University and graduated in 2017. Prior to pursuing a career in music, he worked as an accountant. Kobazzie met singer and record producer Quincy B while in school and was inspired to sing after hearing "State of Emergency", the singer's collaborative single with Tan Tan B. In 2017, he released the Quincy B-produced track "Sleep for What", which appeared on Bilikon Entertainment's compilation album Press Play (2017). Kobazzie said he received the song's instrumental from the producer and freestyled the lyrics. He told FrontPage Africa that Liberian women inspires him to make music. Kobazzie performed at the 2017 Nigeria Entertainment Awards and appeared in an episode of BBC African Voices and VOA African Beat series that same year. Kobazzie left Bilikon Entertainment and told the Daily Observer newspaper that his record deal with the label wasn't profitable. A week after leaving Bilikon, he released the single "Shout Out", which was recorded prior to his exit from the label; he debunked rumours about the song being a diss track.

In 2018, Kobazzie told FrontPage Africa he was working on his 6-track debut extended play, and confirmed that the previously released singles "Check Mike" and "Abelaibah" would appear on the project. On August 3, 2018, Kobazzie released the single "Bounce", which won Song of the Year at the 2019 Liberian Entertainment Awards and was nominated for the same award at both the 2018 Liberia Music Awards and 2019 Tunes Liberia Music Awards. The remix of "Bounce" features vocals by Nigerian singer Davido and was released on March 3, 2019. The song was jointly produced by Kizzy W, Benny Sound, and DrumPhase. The accompanying music video for the track was directed by Simplicity Visuals Studios. The remix of "Bounce" was nominated for Afropop Song of the Year and Collaboration of the Year at the 2019 Liberia Music Awards. Moreover, the song's music video was nominated for Best Music Video at the 2020 Liberian Entertainment Awards and for Best Video of the Year at the 2020 Tunes Liberia Music Awards.

=== 2021–present: "Everyday", Orange SA concert, and government appointment ===
On September 24, 2021, Kobazzie released the Stonebwoy-assisted single "Everyday". He chose to collaborate with Stonebwoy because he wanted to blend afrobeats with dancehall, and believes the singer has a "different vibe of music". After winning an award at the Liberia People's Choice Awards in 2019, he was told he could collaborate with any African artist and video producer of his choice. "Everyday" and its accompanying music video were originally slated for release in the final week of August 2021. In May 2022, Kobazzie performed at four musical concerts held across Nimba, Margibi, Grand Bassa, and Montserrado counties. The concerts commemorated the fifth anniversary of Orange S.A.'s arrival in Liberia, and featured additional performances from MC Caro, Stunna, and Kpanto, among others.

In March 2026, Kobazzie was appointed Liberia's entertainment ambassador by President Joseph Boakai.

== Humanatarian work and criticism of a charity foundation ==
Kobazzie spoke out against rape and gender-based violence issues, and was among a panel of speakers advocating for youth empowerment at the United Nations Symposium in New York. He released the anti-rape song "Say No to Rape", and worked with Stunna and Cralorboi CIC to release the politically inspired track "Say No to Election Violence". Kobazzie urged the Liberian government to prosecute Katie Meyler, the founder of the More Than Me charity organization. He accused her of covering up the sexual abuse scandal at the organization and said her actions were "inhumane and neglectful".

== Personal life ==
Kobazzie has a daughter.

== Awards and nominations ==
Liberian Entertainment Awards
Year	Recipient	Award	Result	Ref
2017	Himself	Best New Artist	Nominated	
2019	"Bounce"	Song of the Year	Won	
2020	"Pro Poor Life"	Song of the Year	Nominated	
2020	"Bounce" (Remix) (featuring Davido)	Best Music Video	Nominated	
Liberia Music Awards
Year	Recipient	Award	Result	Ref
2016	Himself	New Artist of the Year	Won	
2018	Himself	Artist of the Year	Nominated	
2018	Himself	Male Artist of the Year	Nominated	
2018	"Bounce"	Song of the Year	Nominated	
2019	Himself	Artist of the Year	Nominated	
2019	Himself	Male Artist of the Year	Nominated	
2019	"Bounce" (Remix) (featuring Davido)	Afropop Song of the Year	Nominated	
2019	"Bounce" (Remix) (featuring Davido)	Collaboration of the Year	Nominated	
2022	"Party" (featuring Bucky Raw)	Collaboration of the Year	Nominated	
Tunes Liberia Music Awards
Year	Recipient	Award	Result	Ref
2019	Himself	Artist of the Year	Nominated	
2019	Himself	Afropop Artist of the Year	Won	
2019	"Bounce"	Song of the Year	Nominated	
2020	Himself	Artist of the Year	Nominated	
2020	Himself	Afropop Artist of the Year	Nominated	
2020	"Bounce" (Remix) (featuring Davido)	Best Collaboration	Nominated	
2020	"Bounce" (Remix) (featuring Davido)	Best Video of the Year	Nominated	

== See also ==
- List of Liberian musicians
