= Quincy B =

Liberian singer (1993–2017)

- Also known as: Wonda Boy
- Born: Quincy Luwokollie Borrowes; April 24, 1993
- Died: March 3, 2017 (aged 23)
- Genres: Hipco; R&B; afropop
- Occupations: Singer; songwriter; record producer
- Instrument: Vocals
- Years active: 2013–2017
- Label: ALM Records

Quincy Luwokollie Borrowes (April 24, 1993 – March 3, 2017), known professionally as Quincy B, was a Liberian singer, songwriter and record producer. (Note: The Daily Observer reporter Robin Dopoe noted that Quincy B was 23 years old, despite earlier reports claiming he was 20.) He gained recognition in 2013 after releasing his debut single "My Dream", which features a rap verse by rapper Scientific. In 2014, Quincy B released the Tan Tan B-assisted track "State of Emergency", which promotes awareness of the Ebola virus epidemic in Liberia. His music explored hipco, R&B, and afropop. He primarily sung in Kolokwa English and took pride in being Liberian. Quincy B died in a car accident on March 3, 2017. His posthumous album, Mr. All the Time, was issued by ALM Records and released eight days after his death. The album comprises thirteen tracks and consists entirely of previously released singles.

== Life and career ==
Quincy Luwokollie Borrowes was born on April 24, 1993, in Liberia. He started singing in his church choir at an early age, and fled to Ghana with his family during the First Liberian Civil War. Quincy B attended Budumburam High School and studied music education at an unnamed university while residing in Ghana. He returned to Liberia in 2012 and made his music debut in 2013. Producer Infectious Michael is credited with helping him jump-start his music career. Prior to joining Lewiz McCarthy's ALM Records, Quincy B was signed to Michael's record label, Heart Beat Records.

In August 2014, Quincy B released the single "State of Emergency", a song he jointly recorded with Tan Tan B. The track features soulful piano chords and raises awareness about the Ebola virus epidemic in Liberia. "State of Emergency" addresses a public health crisis as exemplified by lyrics like "Pull the alarm, turn on the sirens. I see my people dying, but nobody's firing". In November 2014, Quincy B and rapper Scientific released their collaborative single "Shawty", which is composed of lyrics that uplift African women. He previously worked with Scientific on the single "My Dream", which was his first solo release. Quincy B released the single "Crazy" in 2015. Sky Bar, a rooftop lounge in Sinkor, hosted a release party to commemorate the song's release. Quincy B performed "Crazy" along with the songs "Tumba Baba" and "Shawty Bad". The event featured additional performances from Eric Geso, Cassi Money, Young Classic, Chilla Conani, and Kzee.

In June 2016, the Daily Observer newspaper revealed that Quincy B had agreed to serve as an ambassador for Lonestar Cell, a subsidiary of MTN Group. In 2017, singer Kobazzie released the single "Sleep for What", which was produced by Quincy B and appeared on Bilikon Entertainment's compilation album Press Play (2017). Quincy B and Soul Fresh collaborated on the songs "Friend" and "Praise". In "Friend", he counsels young Liberians to choose their friends wisely. Quincy B released the song "Liberian Girl" and dedicated it to women in Liberia. He acknowledged the Mandingo custom and highlighted the traditional name "Fatumata" on the track.

Quincy B's posthumous album, Mr. All the Time, was issued by ALM Records. The thirteen-track album was released on March 11, 2017, and consists entirely of previously released singles such as "Olukupay", "Mr. All the Time", and "I Pledge". In "Olukupay" and "Mr. All the Time", Quincy B extolled the virtues of Liberian girls. The Sweetz-assisted track "I Pledge" was the last song he recorded before his death. On June 1, 2017, Lonestar Cell announced that they were looking for a new brand ambassador to replace Quincy B.

== Artistry and influences ==
Quincy B's music explored hipco, R&B, and afropop. He sung in Kolokwa English and took pride in being Liberian. Front Page Africa's James Giahyue commended him for being a "true patriot" and said he had a "melodious voice and harmonious notes". Moreover, Giahyue said the singer's career "summed up voice quality, cultured lyrics and the power of the Liberian colloquial". Gerald Koinyeneh acknowledged Quincy B for providing "a therapeutic feeling bigger than entertainment" and said his "sonorous voice and deep lyrics healed people and rehabilitated others". Quincy B cited John Legend, Ne-Yo, and Ryan Leslie as his key musical influences.

== Personal life and death ==
Quincy B had a child with Agnes Kollie, who was nine months pregnant at the time of his death. In an interview with Front Page Africa, Kollie said the singer did not inform his parents about the pregnancy. On March 3, 2017, Quincy B died in a car crash while driving home from a gig at Anglers Bar and Restaurant. There were multiple accounts of the crash. According to the Daily Observer newspaper, Quincy B's 2007 Toyota Camry crashed against the wall of UNMIL headquarters and flipped over. The Bush Chicken's editorial board reported that the singer collided with barriers around the Pan African Plaza building. The other occupants of the car, his friends Margas Gayflor, Cralorboi CIC, and Feouls Kaba, all survived the collision. CIC sustained a shattered leg, while the others were unharmed.

On March 24, a burial ceremony and vigil were held at the Antoinette Tubman Stadium. The funeral drew thousands of fans and featured a number of performers who paid tribute to him. Quincy B's remains were transported to Mount Barclay Cemetery and buried there.

== Discography ==
Posthumous albums

- Mr. All the Time (2017)
- Greatest Hits (2023)

== See also ==
- List of Liberian musicians
- List of people who died in traffic collisions
