= Takun J =

Liberian musician (born 1981)

Background information
- Born: Jonathan Koffa; May 14, 1981 (age 45); Monrovia, Liberia
- Genres: Hipco, hip hop
- Occupations: Rapper; singer; songwriter; activist
- Years active: 2005–present
- Label: Jazzo Entertainment
- Website: takunj.com

Jonathan Koffa (born May 14, 1981), known professionally as Takun J, is a Liberian rapper, singer, songwriter, and activist. He is regarded as one of the pioneers of hipco, a politically charged music genre. The Liberian Gender Ministry designated him as one of its anti-rape ambassadors. Takun J's music addresses socio-political issues in Liberia. He is best known for the singles "Who Make You Cry" (featuring Queen V), "Police Man", "Gbagba is Corruption", and "A Song for Hawa". Takun J's debut studio album, The Time, was released in 2007. His second studio album, My Way, was released in December 2012. Takun J is the recipient of several accolades, including Male Artist of the Year at the 2014 Liberia Music Awards.

== Life and music career ==
=== 1981–2006: Early life and career beginnings ===
Takun J was born on May 14, 1981, in Monrovia, Liberia. He grew up with his mother and three siblings. His father relocated to the United States when he was four years old. While growing up in Monrovia, he played soccer and participated in dancing and talent show competitions. Takun J became passionate about music and decided to pursue a professional career after graduating from high school. When he was 17 years old, he joined a music group called Magnetic. Takun J released his debut single, "We'll Spay You", in 2005. His second single, "You Meaning Me", was released the following year. Having lived through most of his country's 14-year civil conflict, he briefly relocated to refugee camps in Ghana and Ivory Coast with his family.

=== 2007–2012: The Time and My Way ===
Takun J returned to Liberia and released his debut studio album, The Time, in 2007. The album's lead single, "Police Man", is a politically charged song that exposes corruption by officers of the Liberian National Police. The track includes a plea to then-president Ellen Johnson Sirleaf to repress corruption. The song's release prompted two police arrests and a beating. Unfazed by the incident, Takun J performed on the day he was released from jail. In an interview with the Liberian Listener, he said he released "Police Man" in order to create awareness about police negligence. Takun J performs at the annual two-day Hipco festival in Monrovia. On July 27, 2012, he shared the stage with Nasseman, David Mell, Nozi, and Mr. Smith at the Lonestar Cell musical concert. Takun J was one of the acts featured on the remix of Xpolay's critically acclaimed 2012 single "Pot Not Bolling", which was produced by Yor-EL Francis. Takun J told the Liberian Listener that the song was well received because of its positive messages. His second studio album, My Way, was released in December 2012. It features high-BPM dance tracks, Liberian reggae music, and political rap songs. Recorded at Studio 57 and Red Eyez studios, the album was produced by Stone Gray, AB Swaray, King Brian, and Rawlo. My Way features guest contributions from Nasseman, Santos, Soul Smiter, Bentman tha Don, Scientific, Marvalous, and Ice Princess. Takun J addresses his daily struggles on the album and said the songs on it are relatable.

=== 2013–present: "A Song for Hawa", Hipco Accountability Network, and performances ===
In February 2013, Takun J released the solemn track "A Song for Hawa", which was produced by PCI-Media Impact and addresses violence against Liberian girls and women. Takun J wrote the song after visiting a home sheltering victimized young girls. He explained to Mae Azango that it tells the tale of Hawa, a girl who was raped by her uncle after her mother died. The music video for "A Song for Hawa" premiered at the UN Commission on the Status of Women. Takun J has cited Tupac Shakur, Bob Marley and Akon as his key musical influences. He is part of the Hipco Accountability Network, an organization that strengthens copyright laws and establishes minimum play laws in Liberia. The network includes several musical personalities, including Nasseman, JD Donzo, Shining Man, and JB of Soul Fresh. On December 7, 2013, Takun J performed at the second annual Liberia Music Festival, which took place at Slipway Sports Pitch.

In March 2014, the Daily Observer newspaper reported that Takun J signed a two-year endorsement deal with Lonestar Cell. As part of the deal, he is expected to perform at events sponsored by Lonestar Cell and MTN . Together with J. Martins, R2Bees, Scientific, Cypha D'King, Sweetz, and F.A., Takun J played at the Holiday Beach Jam in Congo Town on March 15, 2014. He works with UNICEF as an ambassador of music. In 2020, Takun J collaborated with DenG, Sundaygar Dearboy, Tan Tan, Soul Smiter, Odemz, and Amaze to produce the hipco song "Sanitize". The artists released the song in order to raise awareness about COVID-19 and encourage Liberians to practice good hygiene.

== Humanitarian work ==
=== Anti-rape campaign ===
Takun J became an ambassador for the Liberian Gender Ministry's anti-rape campaign, and was responsible for highlighting rape issues in the country. In order to galvanize communities to take action against violence towards children, UNICEF and PCI-Media Impact organized a series of six concerts, which was part of an expansive campaign to halt the abuse and exploitation of children in Liberia. The first concert in the capital of Grand Bassa County was headlined by Takun J on June 14, 2014. The event featured additional performances from Peaches, Nasseman, and comedian Kpakala Kpokolo. It also included a poignant video highlighting the issue of child rape.

=== Anti-corruption campaign ===
On May 19, 2014, Takun J released "Gbagba is Corruption", a conscious song that is based on the children's book Gbagba (2013). The book was written by Robtel Neajai Pailey, a former doctoral student at SOAS, University of London. Pailey was inspired to write the book in order to give children the verbal tools to question the ethical and moral values of adults around them. The book received critical acclaim and has been adopted as an anti-corruption children's primer by the Liberian Ministry of Education.

== Physical altercation with Edwin Snowe ==
On June 17, 2013, Takun J had an encounter with Edwin Snowe after narrowly escaping a head-on collision with Snowe's vehicle. The incident between the two individuals occurred near the Mamba Point diplomatic community. Takun J said Snowe pulled him out of his car and punched him several times. Snowe confirmed the occurrence of the incident and admitted to punching the musician. After the incident had died down, Takun J wrote a formal complaint to the House of Representatives of Liberia about the punches he received from Snowe.

== Discography ==
Studio albums

- The Time (2007)
- My Way (2012)

Singles (partial)

Year	Title	Album
2005	"We'll Spay You" (with Magnetic)	Non-album single
2006	"You Meaning Me"	Non-album single
2007	"Police Man"	The Time
2007	"Who Make You Cry" (featuring Queen V)	The Time
2007	"Six Jue"	The Time
2013	"A Song for Hawa"	Non-album single
2014	"Gbagba is Corruption"	Non-album single

Guest appearances

List of non-single guest appearances, with other performing artists, showing year released and album name
Title	Year	Other artist(s)	Album
"Down in Africa"	2012	Nasseman	Redemption Time
"Pro Poor Agenda"	2018	Bucky Raw	Cs2
"Come Down"	2021	Kpanto	Sound from the Xtreetz
"White Man Say"	2020	Eric Geso	New Sound

== Awards and nominations ==
Year	Event	Prize	Recipient	Result	Ref
2014	Liberia Music Awards	Artist of the Year	Himself	Nominated	
2014	Liberia Music Awards	Male Artist of the Year	Himself	Won	
2014	Liberia Music Awards	Hipco Artist of the Year	Himself	Won	
2014	Liberia Music Awards	Artist of the Year - Africa	Himself	Nominated	
2014	Liberia Music Awards	Video of the Year	"A Song for Hawa"	Nominated	
2014	Liberia Music Awards	Video of the Year Africa	"A Song for Hawa"	Nominated	
2014	Liberian Entertainment Awards	Best Artist	Himself	Nominated	
2014	Liberian Entertainment Awards	Best Hipco Artist	Himself	Won	
2015	Honesty Oscars	Best Activist Anthem	"Gbagba is Corruption"	Nominated	
2015	Liberian Entertainment Awards	Best Hipco Artist	Himself	Nominated	
2015	Liberia Music Awards	Hipco Artist of the Year	Himself	Won	
2016	Liberia Music Awards	Hipco Song of the Year	"They Lie"	Won	
2019	Tunes Liberia Music Awards	Legendary Award	Himself	Won	

== See also ==
- Music of Liberia
- List of Liberian musicians
