= Faithvonic =

Liberian singer and songwriter

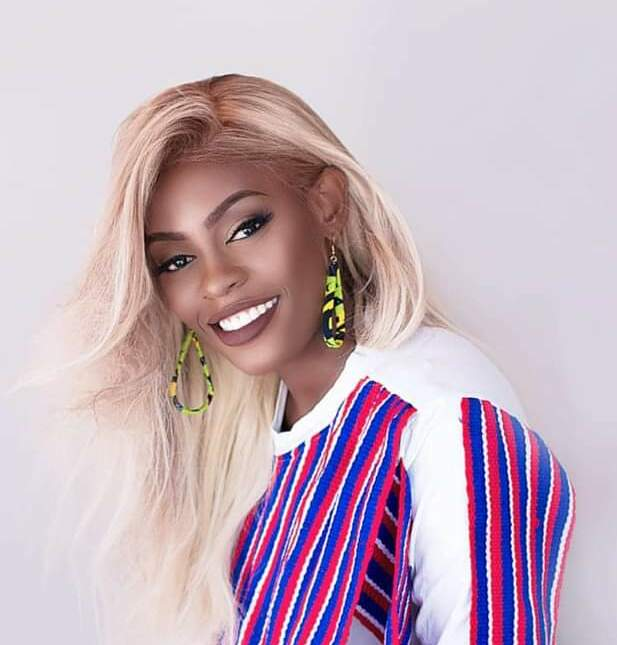

Background information
- Born: Faith Terryson; Liberia
- Genres: Afropop; hipco
- Occupations: Singer; songwriter; fashion designer; graphic designer; content creator; video director
- Instrument: Vocals
- Years active: 2012–present
- Website: Official website

Faith Terryson, who is known professionally as Faithvonic, is a Liberian singer and songwriter from Grand Bassa County. She is also a fashion designer, graphic designer, content creator, and video director. Faithvonic started writing and recording music in 2012, and derived her stage name from her first name and mother's name. She signed a record deal with Kimmie Weeks' KLW Entertainment in 2014, but left the label in 2016 after her contract expired. On February 14, 2021, she released her debut extended play, Rich with You, to coincide with Valentine's Day. Faithvonic has released music to raise awareness about Ebola and COVID-19, and partnered with ActionAid Liberia on several humanitarian projects. Her music is a mixture of Afropop and hipco.

== Life and career ==
=== Early life and education ===
Faithvonic is a member of the Bassa tribe. She has four siblings and was raised by a single mother; her father died when she was two years old. She was physically and mentally abused by her stepfather while growing up. Faithvonic started singing at the age of 10 and used music as a coping mechanism to deal with her childhood trauma. In 2008, she moved to the Philippines to study at Southville International School and Colleges. She also studied information technology and graphic design at Starz College of Science and Technology in Liberia.

=== 2012–present: Career beginnings, singles and Rich with You ===
In 2012, Faithvonic started writing and recording her own music. She derived her stage name from her first name and mother's name Yvonne. In 2014, Faithvonic signed a record deal with KLW Entertainment, a record label owned by Kimmie Weeks. That same year, she and other artists formed the music collective LATA, an acronym for Liberia Artists Together for Advancement. The group recorded "The Hope Song", a track that raises awareness about Liberia's Ebola virus epidemic. It was created in partnership with ActionAid Liberia. In 2016, Faithvonic signed a new record deal with Nebo Records after her contract with KLW Entertainment expired. Her debut single under Nebo Records, "Come For Me", was released in April 2017. In August 2020, she partnered with ActionAid Liberia to release the COVID-19 awareness song "Africa Fight".

In January 2021, Faithvonic collaborated with DJ Weezy, Natif, Fullest 4, and Young Classic to release "Bassa First Bassa Last", the official County Meet song for Grand Bassa County. She lent vocals to Angel Dweh's Afropop single "Come Over", which was released on January 15, 2021. On February 14, 2021, Faithvonic released her debut extended play, Rich with You, to coincide with Valentine's Day. The EP has six tracks and features collaborations with Stunna, T Crack, and Kpanto. It was initially intended to be released as an album but due to the COVID-19 pandemic, her team decided to release it as an EP. Produced by Mr. Valuable and Stunnashine, all of the songs on Rich with You are personal and depict real life events. Faithvonic dedicated the title track, "Rich with You", to her fans and partner.

In October 2022, Faithvonic released the single "Badway", which features vocals by Takun J and PCK; it was described as "an up-tempo, fast-paced ode to love". Faithvonic dedicated the song to lovers and newlyweds, and said listeners would easily relate to it. She is a brand ambassador for several brands, including Glow Liberia, GC Luxury Beauty, and Zara Mall.

== Humanitarian work ==
Faithvonic partnered with ActionAid Liberia to hold a public dialogue at Red Light Market, where she spoke to men about violence against women. She has been involved with ActionAid Liberia's Safe Cities campaign and Activista youth network. She also serves as a Girls Rights ambassador for ActionAid Liberia. Faithvonic founded the "Speak Out Loud" foundation, an initiative that provides education for street sellers and underprivileged girls.

== Artistry and influences ==
Faithvonic's music is a mixture of Afropop and hipco. In an interview with Euronews, she said she makes music to uplift people and that creating music helps her cope with personal trauma. The organization ActionAid stated that her music "amplify voices of young and often marginalized people" and "acts as a medium for creativity and innovation whilst raising awareness to change social behaviour". Faithvonic has cited Oprah Winfrey, Beyoncé, Shakira, and Ciara as her key influences.

== Discography ==
EPs

- Rich with You (2021)

== Awards and nominations ==
Liberia Music Awards
Year	Recipient	Award	Result	Ref
2015	Herself	Female Artist of the Year	Nominated	
2017	Herself	Female Artist of the Year	Nominated	
2018	Herself	Female Artist of the Year	Nominated	
2019	Herself	Female Artist of the Year	Nominated	
2020	Herself	Female Artist of the Year	Nominated	
2021	Herself	Female Artist of the Year	Nominated	
Tunes Liberia Music Awards
Year	Recipient	Award	Result	Ref
2018	Herself	Female Artist of the Year	Nominated	
2019	Herself	Female Artist of the Year	Nominated	
2020	Herself	Best Female Artist	Won	
2021	Herself	Best Female Artist	Nominated	

== See also ==
- List of Liberian musicians
