= List of Liberian musicians =

This is a list of musicians and musical groups from Liberia. Only notable individuals appear here.

== Musical groups ==
- Soulful Dynamics
- Soul Fresh
- Zack & Geebah

== Musicians ==
- 2C
- Quincy B
- Agnes Nebo von Ballmoos
- MC Caro
- Benji Cavalli
- Christoph the Change
- Cralorboi CIC
- Sundaygar Dearboy
- DenG
- Nyan Dokpa
- Jones Dopoe
- Morris Dorley
- Miatta Fahnbulleh
- Wesseh Freeman
- Faithvonic
- Fatu Gayflor
- Eric Geso
- Eddie Johns
- JZyNO
- Kobazzie
- Kpanto
- Billema Kwillia
- Knero Lapaé
- Irene Logan
- Olmstead Luca
- Nasseman
- Dawn Padmore
- Malinda Jackson Parker
- Queen V
- Bucky Raw
- Tecumsay Roberts
- Scientific
- Takun J
- Tokay Tomah
- Joe Woyee
- Yatta Zoe
