= Queen V =

Liberian rapper (born 1982)

- Born: Avenette Tennema Sirleaf; September 17, 1982 (age 44); Sinkor, Monrovia, Liberia
- Occupations: Rapper; singer; songwriter; dancer
- Years active: 2006–present
- Children: 2
- Musical career
- Genre: Hipco
- Instrument: Vocals

Avenette Tennema Sirleaf (born September 17, 1982), known professionally as Queen V, is a Liberian rapper, singer, songwriter, and dancer. She made her music debut in 2006 with "Far Way to Go", becoming the first female artist to release a hipco song. In 2008, Queen V won the fourth edition of Next Movie Star, a Nigerian reality television show. In 2013, she released the hit single "Jue You Bad", which features vocals by DenG and a rap verse by Tan Tan B.

== Life and career ==
Avenette Tennema Sirleaf was born on September 17, 1982, at Cooper's Clinic in Sinkor. She started out as a dancer at the age of 15, performing at local basketball games with her dancing companion Queen B. The rapper made her music debut in 2006 with "Far Way to Go", becoming the first female artist to release a hipco song. She has released eleven other singles and collaborated with other artists since putting out her debut song. In 2008, Queen V won the fourth edition of Next Movie Star, a Nigerian reality television show. She was awarded several prizes, including a new vehicle, movie contracts, and $5,000 in cash. In 2013, Queen V released the hit single "Jue You Bad", which features vocals by DenG and a rap verse by Tan Tan B. The track won Song of the Year at the 2013 Liberia Music Awards. The music video for "Jue You Bad" won Best Music Video at the 2014 Liberian Entertainment Awards. Queen V was featured on Takun J's single "Who Make You Cry", which was labeled a "classic" by Afropop Worldwide. Her single "This Is Where I'm From" features acts such as Cypha D'King, Nasseman, and Takun J.

In 2016, Queen V released the single "You Na Want Me", which features vocals by PCK and L'Franklin. The song was recorded in Ghana, where the rapper lived for a year. In October 2017, Queen V released the singles "Sidiki" and "I Na Gbelleh". The former talks about a penniless fellow who wants to be with her without giving her any money, while the latter is a braggadocious song about her musical comeback. Within a week of being released, both songs received over 700 downloads on Tunes Liberia. Robin Dopoe, a reporter for the Daily Observer, stated that Queen V released the song in order to reinstate her relevance in the Liberian music industry. In April 2018, Queen V disclosed that she considered quitting music due to gender inequality within the Liberian music industry. She believes that male disc jockeys in the industry do not promote songs made by female musicians.

== Artistry ==
Queen V considers herself to be the "Goddess of Hipco", and is known for her distinctive lyrics and creativity. The rapper's melodic delivery and mannerism helped reinvent hipco. Queen V took a brief hiatus from music to focus on motherhood, and has been instrumental to the movement that saw the rise of female emcees in the industry.

== Personal life ==
Queen V has two boys. In March 2026, the rapper said she was seeking justice after economist Samuel Jackson allegedly admitted to killing her father during a Facebook Live broadcast.

== Awards and nominations ==
Year	Event	Prize	Recipient	Result	Ref
2013	Liberia Music Awards	Song of the Year	"Jue You Bad"	Won	
2014	Liberian Entertainment Awards	Best Music Video	"Jue You Bad"	Won	

== See also ==
- List of Liberian musicians
