= Eric Geso =

Liberian singer and songwriter

- Born: Eric Tarh
- Genres: Afropop; Gbema
- Occupations: Singer; songwriter
- Instrument: Vocals
- Years active: 2015–present

Eric Tarh, who is better known as Eric Geso, is a Liberian singer and songwriter. He is the recipient of several accolades, including Male Artist of the Year at the 2015 Liberia Music Awards and Best New Artist at the 2016 Liberian Entertainment Awards. His debut studio album, Aziooo, was released on May 15, 2019. It was nominated for Album of the Year at the 2019 Liberia Music Awards and for Best Album/Mixtape/Compilation at the 2020 Tunes Liberia Music Awards. Geso released his second studio album, New Sound, on October 15, 2021. His music is a mixture of Afropop and Gbema.

== Career ==
Geso was invited to perform at the 2015 Liberia Music Awards, but was denied a visa at the U.S. Embassy in Monrovia. In September 2015, he worked with singer Miatta Fahnbulleh on a two-day campaign to help shed light on Liberia's maternal mortality, teenage pregnancy and sexually transmitted infection issues. In August 2017, Geso appeared on Liberia Music Insider's list of the 5 Best Live Acts in Liberia.

On June 14, 2018, Geso released the Kizzy W-assisted single "Taya", which was nominated for Collaboration of the Year at the 2018 Liberia Music Awards and for Song of the Year at the 2019 Tunes Liberia Music Awards. One of his aides told the Daily Observer newspaper that he released the song in order to issue an apology to the mother of his twin children. In October 2018, Geso called Duke Blac unprofessional and accused the producer of leaking his song "Bamplay". According to a Facebook post by Geso, Duke Blac denied the accusation and said his girlfriend mistakenly leaked the song. Geso's 15-track debut studio album, Aziooo, was released on May 15, 2019. It was nominated for Album of the Year at the 2019 Liberia Music Awards and for Best Album/Mixtape/Compilation at the 2020 Tunes Liberia Music Awards.

On July 1, 2020, Geso released the single "Oh Wow", which was nominated for Song of the Year at both the 2020 Liberia Music Awards and 2021 Tunes Liberia Music Awards. The accompanying music video for "Oh Wow" was nominated for Video of the Year at the 2020 Liberia Music Awards. Geso launched Gesosound, an entertainment equipment rental service. Lester Tarr, DJ Blue, and Al Johnson, all well-known figures in the Liberian music industry, signed a career contract with Geso in May 2021. The agreement aims to connect him with musicians outside of Liberia and branding firms in the U.S., as well as to promote his music abroad. On October 15, 2021, Geso released his second studio album, New Sound, which features guest appearances from Kpanto, Takun J, AFo4Doe, and Natif.

== Discography ==
Studio albums

- Aziooo (2019)
- New Sound (2021)

== Awards and nominations ==
Liberian Entertainment Awards
Year	Recipient	Award	Result	Ref
2016	Himself	Best New Artist	Won	
2017	Himself	Best Artist	Nominated	
2020	Himself	Best Artist	Nominated	
Liberia Music Awards
Year	Recipient	Award	Result	Ref
2015	Himself	Male Artist of the Year	Won	
2015	Himself	Afropop Artist of the Year	Won	
2016	Himself	Artist of the Year	Nominated	
2016	Himself	Male Artist of the Year	Nominated	
2016	Himself	Afropop Artist of the Year	Nominated	
2016	Himself	Performer of the Year	Nominated	
2016	Himself	Artist of the Year Africa	Nominated	
2017	Himself	Afropop Artist of the Year	Nominated	
2017	"Go Home"	Afropop/Afro Dance Song of the Year	Nominated	
2018	Himself	Male Artist of the Year	Nominated	
2018	Himself	Afropop Artist of the Year	Nominated	
2018	"Taya" (featuring Kizzy W)	Collaboration of the Year	Nominated	
2019	Himself	Artist of the Year	Nominated	
2019	Himself	Afropop Artist of the Year	Nominated	
2019	Aziooo	Album of the Year	Nominated	
2020	Himself	Artist of the Year	Won	
2020	Himself	Male Artist of the Year	Nominated	
2020	Himself	Afropop Artist of the Year	Nominated	
2020	Himself	Traditional/Gbema Artist of the Year	Won	
2020	"Oh Wow"	Song of the Year	Nominated	
2020	"Oh Wow"	Video of the Year	Nominated	
2021	Himself	Artist of the Year	Nominated	
2021	Himself	Male Artist of the Year	Nominated	
2021	Himself	Traditional/Gbema Artist of the Year	Won	
2021	"Kekeleh" (featuring Natif)	Song of the Year	Nominated	
2021	"Kekeleh" (featuring Natif)	Collaboration of the Year	Nominated	
2022	Himself	Artist of the Year	Nominated	
2022	Himself	Male Artist of the Year	Nominated	
2022	Himself	Traditional Artist of the Year	Won	
Tunes Liberia Music Awards
Year	Recipient	Award	Result	Ref
2019	Himself	Artist of the Year	Nominated	
2019	Himself	Afropop Artist of the Year	Nominated	
2019	"Taya" (featuring Kizzy W)	Song of the Year	Nominated	
2020	Himself	Artist of the Year	Nominated	
2020	Himself	Afropop Artist of the Year	Nominated	
2020	"We Will Marry"	Song of the Year	Nominated	
2020	Aziooo	Best Album/Mixtape/Compilation	Nominated	
2021	Himself	Artist of the Year	Won	
2021	Himself	Best Traditional/Gbema Artist	Won	
2021	"Oh Wow"	Song of the Year	Nominated	
Nigeria Entertainment Awards
Year	Recipient	Award	Result	Ref
2016	Himself	African Male Artist of the Year (Non Nigerian)	Nominated	

== See also ==
- List of Liberian musicians
