= Music of Liberia =

The music of Liberia uses many tribal beats and often one of the native dialects, or vernacular. Liberian music includes traditional Gbema music, as well as the popular genre Hipco.

== Gbema music or traditional music ==
Liberian music makes particular use of vocal harmony, repetition and call-and-response song structure as well as such typical West African elements as ululation and the polyrhythm typical of rhythm in Sub-Saharan Africa. Christian music was introduced to Liberia by American missionaries and Christian songs are now sung in a style that mixes American harmonies with West African language, rhythm and the call-and-response format. Traditional music is performed at weddings, naming ceremonies, royal events and other special occasions, as well as ordinary children's songs, work songs and lullabies.

== Popular music ==
Highlife, and Hiplife music are very popular in Liberia, as elsewhere in West Africa. Both Highlife and Hiplife music evolved out of Africa's original sound called Palmwine Music or Gbema music genre. All African music legends since 1920s were greatly inspired by the Palmwine music which originated out of Liberia in 1918-1920 by indigenous kru tribe of the Grain Coast of Africa. Late in the 1950s, a combination of North American, West African and Latin American styles, emerged in Ghana, Sierra Leone and Liberia, especially among the Liberian Kru people, who were sailors that learned to played Funk, Jazz, and Fuji from Americo Liberians who settled on the African continent from Louisiana, USA during the abolition of Slavery between 1822-1846. The Kru people played Spanish guitar, banjo, pennywhistle, harmonica, accordion, mandolin and concertina and their sounds inspired the rest of African music since then. The Palm wine music also known as Gbema music genre also inspired the evolution of HipCo music in Liberia.

Past and present musicians include Fatu Gayflor and Miatta Fahnbulleh.

The country's most renowned radio station is ELBC, or the Liberian Broadcasting System. Rap and pop music are also performed in indigenous languages across the country.

In 1963, President Tubman set up the new Cape-Palmas Military Band (CPMB). Israeli bandmaster Aharon Shefi formed and conducted a 56-piece concert and marching band that performed Liberian, American and universal folk and church music. The CPMB has performed on January 1, 1964, at President Tubman's inauguration in Monrovia. Among the pieces played were Highlife, original marches by the late Liberian composer Victor Bowya, the National Anthem and "The Lone Star Forever". The CPMB had also performed in churches, schools, holidays and military parades and official events.

== Hipco ==
Liberia has a unique Liberian rap and singing genre called Hipco, or "Co". The "co" in the genre is short for the Liberian dialect Kolokwa. Hipco is usually performed in Liberian English or the local vernacular. Kolokwa rap in Gbema music evolved in the 1980s but was not branded as HipCo music genre until 2002-2003 when HipCo was founded or established by the Liberian Legendary Detrench, the late DJ SummerTime and MC Switch. HipCo has always had a social and political bent. In the 1990s it continued to develop through the civil wars. Hipco music was becoming popular in 2004 and still is the most popular music genre of Liberia, "serving as the medium through which rappers and singers speak against societal ills, including injustice and corruption and also with an infusion of enticing lyrics for pleasure." UNICEF has worked with Hipco artists to release Hipco songs on Ebola prevention, with several of the songs becoming popular on radio in the country in 2014. Among high-profile Hipco artists are Takun J, DenG, and MC Caro.

== See also ==
- Liberian Entertainment Awards
- Culture of Liberia
- List of Liberian musicians
