= DenG =

Liberian singer (born 1984)

- Born: Daniel Tom George; September 1, 1984 (age 42); Bong County, Liberia
- Genres: Afro pop; R&B
- Occupations: Singer; songwriter

Daniel Tom George (born September 1, 1984), who is known professionally as DenG, is a Liberian singer and songwriter from Bong County. He started his music career as an R&B artist before making a guest appearance on Emma Smith's single "I Want to Go". DenG rose to prominence after being featured on Queen V's 2013 hit single "Jue You Bad". Following the success of "Jue You Bad", he switched from R&B to Afro pop. DenG released his debut studio album, New Seh, on August 23, 2023.

== Life and career ==
=== 1984–2015: Early life, education, and music releases ===
A member of the Kpelle tribe, Daniel Tom George was born on September 1, 1984, in Bong County, Liberia. He developed an interest in music at a young age and joined the choir at his church. DenG relocated to Ghana during the Second Liberian Civil War and attended Achimota School while living there. He returned to Liberia and studied business at the United Methodist University. DenG started his music career as an R&B artist before venturing into Afro pop music, and was featured on Emma Smith's single "I Want to Go". He gained prominence in 2013 after being featured on Queen V's hit single "Jue You Bad", which also features a rap verse by Tan Tan B. In 2014, DenG released the single "They Vex", a song that addresses the jealousy associated with fame and recognition. His management team announced that a tee-shirt collection, featuring the phrase "If they vex, let them buss", would arrive in Liberia.

DenG collaborated with F.A and Soul Fresh to record "Ebola is Real", a hipco track that informs Liberians about ways they can protect and prevent the spread of Ebola. Recorded in Kolokwa, "Ebola is Real" was created in partnership with Liberia's Ministry of Health & Social Welfare and the radio station Hott FM. DenG won Artist of the Year and Song of the Year for "They Vex" at the 2015 Liberia Music Awards. He also won Best Artist and Song of the Year for "They Vex" at the 2015 Liberian Entertainment Awards. DenG signed a $50,000 endorsement deal with Novafone Liberia. His single "Kemah", which was released in 2015, earned him a nomination for Best New Artist at the African Entertainment Awards that same year.

=== 2016–2019: "Put Foot", MAMA nomination, tour, and performances ===
In January 2016, DenG posted a note on his Facebook page, expressing his desire to quit music. However, in a telephone interview with LIB Life, he stated that the purpose of his post was to determine whether Liberians were still interested in his career. The music video for DenG's "Put Foot" was released in January 2016. The singer first announced plans for the video's release earlier that month. He accused his manager Alice Yawo of downgrading the video's quality after she thanked a fan, who belittled the video, for their comments. In June 2016, DenG and Yawo had a fallout from their unwillingness to communicate. He was nominated for Listener's Choice at the 2016 MTV Africa Music Awards, becoming the first Liberian artist to receive a MAMA nomination. In late 2016, DenG performed with Christoph the Change, Kcee and Tekno at Beach Jam, a concert sponsored by Lonestar Cell. On June 9, 2017, he released the Sarkodie-assisted track "Janjay", which was jointly produced by Liberia's Stone Luckshine and Ghana's Possigee. Described as a Liberian highlife song, "Janjay" contains lyrics about a girl's dream. Prior to the song's release, DenG enlisted Kcee to appear on his track "Make Dem Talk".

In July 2017, Emma Smith recruited DenG to lent vocals to her single "Hold Ground", an up-tempo track that has elements of Afrobeat and dancehall. In May 2018, DenG planned the first leg of his American tour, which culminated with a performance in Washington, D.C. In June 2018, African Entertainment Management Group (AEMG) announced via a press release that they terminated DenG's management agreement. In August 2018, the singer performed at the One Africa Music Fest, becoming the first Liberian act to perform at the festival. Held at the Ford Amphitheater at Coney Island, the festival featured additional performances from Wizkid, Flavour N'abania, Tekno, Sarkodie, Cassper Nyovest and Diamond Platnumz. DenG was one of the Liberian acts who performed at a concert headlined by Nigerian singer Davido; the concert was held at the Samuel Kanyon Doe Sports Complex in November 2018.

=== 2020–present: "Sanitize" and New Seh ===
In 2020, DenG collaborated with Takun J, Sundaygar Dearboy, Tan Tan, Soul Smiter, Odemz, and Amaze to produce the hipco song "Sanitize". The artists released the song in order to raise awareness about COVID-19 and encourage Liberians to practice good hygiene. DenG released his debut studio album, New Seh, on August 23, 2023. The album has twenty-five tracks and features collaborations with PCK, Barsee, Boifatty, and King Buju, among others.

== Personal life ==
In January 2018, The New Dawn newspaper reported that DenG's brother Smith George died in Margibi County. George's body was discovered with foam around the mouth.

== Discography ==
Studio albums

- New Seh (2023)

== Awards and nominations ==
Year	Event	Prize	Recipient	Result	Ref
2015	Liberian Entertainment Awards	Best Artist	Himself	Won	
2015	Liberian Entertainment Awards	Song of the Year	"They Vex"	Won	
2015	Liberia Music Awards	Song of the Year	"They Vex"	Won	
2015	Liberia Music Awards	Artist of the Year	Himself	Won	
2015	Liberia Music Awards	Afro Pop Artist of the Year	Himself	Nominated	
2015	African Entertainment Awards	Best New Artist	Himself	Nominated	
2016	Nigeria Entertainment Awards	African Male Artist of the Year (Non Nigerian)	Himself	Nominated	
2016	MTV Africa Music Awards	Listener's Choice	Himself	Nominated	
2018	Tunes Liberia Music Awards	Artist of the Year	Himself	Won	
2018	Tunes Liberia Music Awards	Song of the Year	"Grateful"	Won	
2018	Liberia Music Awards	Artist of the Year	Himself	Nominated	

== See also ==
- List of Liberian musicians
