= Nasseman =

Liberian reggae singer (born 1979)

- Born: Rabbie Nassrallah; 1979 (age 46–47)
- Genres: Reggae
- Occupations: Singer; songwriter; activist
- Instrument: Vocals
- Website: nasseman.com

Rabbie Nassrallah (born 1979), who is better known as Nasseman, is a Liberian reggae singer, songwriter, and activist. He gained recognition after releasing the 2015 single "Till We Meet Again", which was written to honor his mentor Ras Katata. His music primarily addresses social issues prevalent in Liberia. Nasseman has written songs for several Liberian artists, and released the albums Till We Meet (2008) and Redemption Time (2012).

== Life and career ==
Nasseman was born in 1979, to a Liberian father of Lebanese descent and a Liberian mother. Raised in Monrovia, he lived through Liberia's first and second civil war and witnessed the killing and destruction caused by rival warlords. Nasseman started performing when he was 11 years old. He opened for Akon when the singer performed in Liberia in 2006, and was one of the headline acts at Ellen Johnson Sirleaf's 2006 presidential inauguration. Nasseman is part of the Hipco Accountability Network, an organization that strengthens copyright laws and establishes minimum play laws in Liberia. The network includes several musical personalities, including Takun J, JD Donzo, Shining Man, and JB of Soul Fresh. Nasseman's song "Bonkey" was released in 2012 and recognized with a prize at the Fair Play Anti-Corruption music competition, which was arranged by International Anti-Corruption Conference participants.

In May 2015, Nasseman opened NasseBar, a reggae bar located in Fiamah, Montserrado County. He went to the University of Liberia campus in December 2015 to witness Accountability Lab's Corruption Must Go musical campaign, and performed his pan-African anthem "All Africans" at the event. In 2019, Nasseman released the single "Who Stole the Money?", along with its music video. The song is a protest song that references the disappearance of $25 million from the Central Bank of Liberia. In an interview with the Daily Observer newspaper, Nasseman said he released the song in order to reawaken the public's interests in the L$16 billion that went missing in a shipping container the previous year. Moreover, he said he wants authorities in charge to reveal the truth about the missing funds. Nasseman was featured on "Gangsta Bankers", an anti-corruption song by Indian rock band Rain in Sahara. A blend of reggae and rock, the song was released on April 29, 2022. The accompanying music video for "Gangsta Bankers" was filmed in Liberia and India. Nasseman recorded the song with the band after meeting them at the Fair Play Anti-Corruption Youth Voices program in Copenhagen.

Nasseman released the reggae song "The Boy from Gibraltar" in January 2023. He wrote the song himself and Master Lzee of Las Vegas Studios mixed it. Lyrically, the record addresses some of the missteps of the Weah administration and chronicles the positives of the president's career thus far. "The Boy from Gibraltar" serves as the official music for Rodney Sieh's book George Weah: The Story of Africa's Footballer President – An Unofficial Biography (2023). The accompanying music video for the song was directed by Alexander Wiaplah, who is commonly known as Usher. Sieh said he chose to work with Nasseman because he is a big fan of the singer's music and believes the singer "understands the project of the Weah story".

== Humanitarian work ==
Nasseman is an ambassador for Transparency International. He also served as an HIV/AIDS ambassador in 2010. In January 2013, Nasseman was part of Let's Speak Out, a program created by PCI Media Impact to help combat sexual violence in Liberia. He performed with rapper Takun J and singer Peaches during a three-day county tour that included stops in Grand Bassa and Bong counties. Nasseman is a member of Fair Play, a movement composed of young artists speaking out against corruption and social injustice. The movement is supported by several artists, including Choc Quib Town, Alika, and Dubioza Kolektiv.

== Artistry ==
Nasseman's music is influenced by the music of Bob Marley, Nasio Fontaine, Buju Banton, and Sizzla Kalonji. His music primarily addresses social issues prevalent in Liberia. Nasseman considers his music to be a "vehicle for change", and has included love ballads and club songs on his albums. The organization Vital Voices stated that although his lyrics and tone are "sometimes critical", he has found relief through music in order to overcome "the atrocities musicians like himself witnessed".

== Discography ==
- Till We Meet (2008)
- Redemption Time (2012)

== Awards and nominations ==
Year	Event	Prize	Recipient	Result	Ref
2018	Liberia Music Awards	Reggae/Dancehall Artist of the Year	Himself	Won	
2019	Tunes Liberia Music Awards	Best Reggae/Dancehall Artist of the Year	Himself	Nominated	
2020	Tunes Liberia Music Awards	Best Reggae/Dancehall Artist of the Year	Himself	Nominated	
2020	Liberia Music Awards	Reggae/Dancehall Artist of the Year	Himself	Nominated	
2021	Liberia Music Awards	Reggae/Dancehall Artist of the Year	Himself	Nominated	
2021	Tunes Liberia Music Awards	Best Reggae/Dancehall Artist of the Year	Himself	Won	

== See also ==
- List of Liberian musicians
