= Tidal Rave Festival =

African music festival

- Locations: La Palm Royal Beach Hotel, Accra, Ghana; Caesar's Beach and Resort, Marshall, Liberia
- Years active: 2011–present
- Organiser: Echo House
- Website: tidalravefestival.com

Tidal Rave Festival, formerly known as Tidal Rave, is an African music festival held annually in Ghana and Liberia. The festival started in 2011 by the Ghanaian organization, Echo House.

== Background ==
Tidal Rave Festival started in 2011 by Echo House as a music beach festival for the young Ghanaian university students who are on vacation. This was an opportunity for the young Ghanaian to catch up on the latest music performances by musicians from Ghana and across Africa.

== History ==
Tidal Rave Festival was co-founded in 2011 as Tidal Rave by Beryl Agyekum. The festival is organised by Echo House.

The festival started from the beach fronts in Kokrobite a suburb of Accra but was moved to the La Palm Royal Beach Hotel in 2024 when it was made a festival which now included music performances, dance, food markets, arts etc.

In 2023, Tidal Rave Festival organized its first show in Marshall, Liberia. The event was held at Caesar's Beach and Resort and featured performances from Nuchie Meek, MC Caro, Stunna, and Christoph the Change, among others.

== International Rave ==
Tidal rave has transcended beyond the shores of Ghana into other African nations. Already portrayed as one of West Africa's Biggest Beach Festivals, has now established event sessions in Lagos Nigera and South Africa's Durban.
