= Bucky Raw =

Liberian rapper (born 1984)

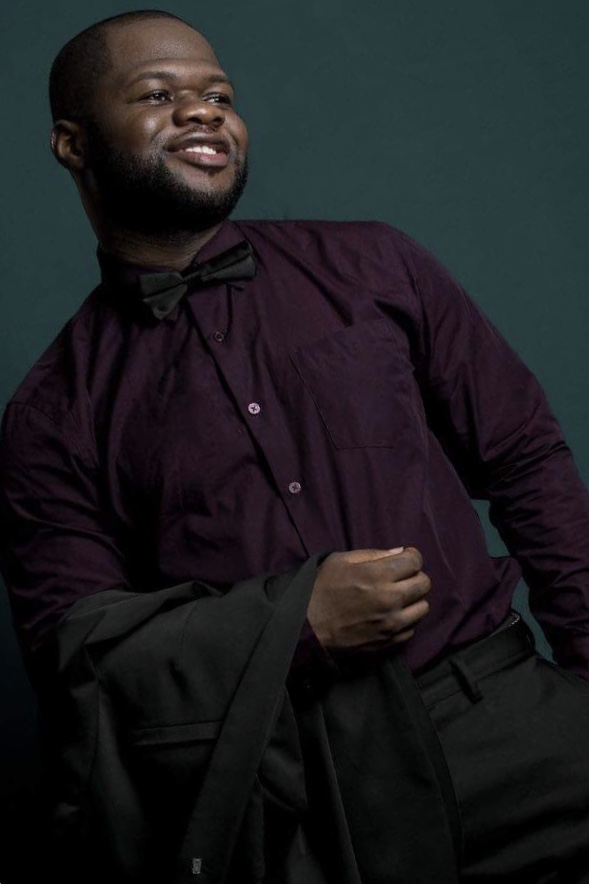
- .

Background information
- Born: Karwoudou Cole; April 30, 1984 (age 42); Monrovia, Liberia
- Origin: Southwest Philadelphia, Pennsylvania
- Genres: Hip hop; trapco; hipco
- Occupations: Rapper; songwriter
- Years active: 2016–present
- Label: Child Soldier Entertainment

Karwoudou Cole (born April 30, 1984), who is better known by his stage name Bucky Raw, is a Liberian rapper and songwriter from Monrovia. He rose to fame after appearing in a cypher at the 2016 Liberian Entertainment Awards. Raw has released the mixtapes Country Soda (2017) and Cs2 (2018).

== Early life and music career ==
Raw was born on April 30, 1984, in Monrovia, Liberia. He moved to the United States when he was 9 years old. Raw grew up in a public housing unit in Southwest Philadelphia, and attended Pepper Middle School and John Bartram High School. In 2017, Raw released his debut mixtape Country Soda, which features guest appearances from King Sammy, Drape Lawson, Mz Menneh and Monica Ree. His second mixtape CS2, which was released in August 2018, comprises 12 tracks and features guest appearances from Takun J, Jay Awesome, Tieah Boy and Rickslyn. It peaked at number 10 on the Billboard World Albums chart, and was criticized for having derogatory lyrics. On November 16, 2019, Raw won Artist of the Year and the Video of the Year for "Thank You" at the Liberia Music Awards.

=== Deportation from the US ===
In April 2018, Raw was arrested and deported to Liberia for violating the terms of his parole.

== Discography ==
=== Mixtapes ===
- Country Soda (2017)
- CS2 (2018)

=== Singles ===
- "Amen"
- "Mammie Peppeh"
- "Pro Poor Agenda"
- "Wine Your Waist"
- "Scrapper Heaven"
- "Which One Heting You"
- "Last Kiss"
- "Friskayness"
- "Woo Mii"
- "Imported"
- "Trapco Issues"
- "Pump Tire"
- "Put Talk"
- "Jeh Leh Y'all"
- "Jeh Bring It"
- "Space on You"
- "Luv"
- "Wifey"
- "Thank You"
- "Abena"

== Award and nominations ==
=== Tunes Liberia Music Awards ===
| Year | Recipient/Nominated work | Award | Result | Ref |
|---|---|---|---|---|
| 2018 | Himself | Fan Army Of The Year | Won | |
| 2018 | Himself | Album/Mixtape Compilation | Won | |
| 2018 | Himself | Trapco Artist of the Year | Won | |

=== Liberia Music Awards ===
| Year | Recipient/Nominated work | Award | Result | Ref |
|---|---|---|---|---|
| 2018 | Himself | Album of the Year | Won | |
| 2018 | Himself | MTN People’s Choice | Won | |
| 2019 | Himself | Artist of the Year | Won | |
| 2019 | "Thank You" | Video of the Year | Won | |

=== Liberian Entertainment Awards ===
| Year | Recipient/Nominated work | Award | Result | Ref |
|---|---|---|---|---|
| 2017 | Himself | Best Hipco Artist | Won | |

== See also ==
- List of Liberian musicians
