= Cralorboi CIC =

Liberian singer, actor, businessman (born 1994)

- Also known as: CIC
- Born: Maurice Tosh Gayflor; 23 July 1994 (age 32); Montserrado County, Liberia
- Education: African Methodist Episcopal University (BBA)
- Genres: HipCo, KoloPop
- Occupations: Singer-songwriter, actor, and businessman
- Years active: 2013 – present
- Label: Cralor Boi Empire Epiq Entertainment Global

Maurice Tosh Gayflor (born 23 July 1994), who goes by the stage name Cralorboi CIC, is a Liberian Hipco and Kolopop singer-songwriter, as well as an actor and businessman.

He was signed to SOG Records Empire between 2016 and 2021, and is known for the singles "Big Papa", "Jon Buttay", "Hello" featuring Joey B, and "Weekend" featuring Iyanya. He has been featured on BBC Radio 1Xtra and was part of One Africa Music Festival's global foundation event for COVID-19 awareness.

== Early life and education ==
Cralorboi CIC was born in the township of Brewerville, Montserrado County, and started making music in 2013.

Cralorboi CIC graduated with a Bachelor of Business Administration degree in management at the African Methodist Episcopal University.

== Music career ==
In 2018, CIC had his first successful international tour in Australia and become the first Liberian-based artist to sell out a show in Melbourne and the third African artist behind Flavour and Bracket to do so. He performed at the Ponobiom Concert, alongside Sarkodie, Stonebwoy, Samini, and Edem. CIC has also performed with Mr P, Kcee, Iyanya, Kizz Daniel and Tekno.

His debut studio album, titled 1994 The Throne, was released in 2019; it features guest appearances from Medikal, Iyanya, Buffalo Souljah, Aramide and MzVee.

== Brand ambassador ==
In 2017, CIC was named the brand ambassador of Lonestar Cell, a Liberian telecommunications company.

In December 2023, Cralorboi CIC became a 1xBet ambassador.

== Business and acting ==
CIC is the owner of Cralorboi Clothing, founder of Cralorboi Empire, and a shareholder in Muscat FC.

He stars in the film Wheel and Deal.

== Awards and nominations ==
| Year | Organization | Award | Nominated work | Result |
|---|---|---|---|---|
| 2020 | Liberian Entertainment Awards | Artist of the Year | | Won |
| 2020 | Tunes Liberia | Song of the Year | "Big Papa" | Won |
| 2019 | Tunes Liberia | Song of the Year | "Weekend" | Won |
| 2019 | Tunes Liberia | Album of the Year | "1994 The Throne" | Won |
| 2019 | Liberia Music Awards | AfroPop Song of the Year | "Big Papa" | Won |
| 2018 | Liberia Music Awards | Male Artist of the Year | | Won |
| 2018 | Liberia Music Awards | Artist of the Year | | Won |
| 2018 | Tunes Liberia | Artist of the Year | | Won |
| 2018 | Liberia Youth Award | Artist of the Year | | Won |
| 2018 | Liberia Entertainment Award Australia | Artist of the year | | Won |
| 2018 | National Aids Commission | Humanitarian Award | | Won |
| 2017 | Liberia Music Awards | Male Artist | | Won |
| 2017 | Liberia Music Awards | Best Video | Hello | Won |
| 2017 | Liberia Music Awards | Collaboration of the Year | "Brother" | Won |
| 2017 | Liberia Music Awards | HipCo Artist of the Year | | Won |
| 2017 | Tunes Liberia | Afropop Artist of the Year | | Won |
| 2017 | Liberian Entertainment Awards | HipCo Artist of the Year | | Won |

== See also ==
- List of actors
- List of hip-hop musicians
- List of Liberian musicians
- List of singer-songwriters
