= MC Caro =

Liberian rapper (born 1996)

- Also known as: King Caro
- Born: Caroline Moore; August 10, 1996 (age 30); New Kru Town, Liberia
- Genres: Hip hop; hipco; trapco; Afropop
- Occupations: Rapper; singer; songwriter
- Instrument: Keyboard
- Years active: 2018–present
- Label: Independent

Caroline Moore (born August 10, 1996), known professionally as MC Caro, is a Liberian rapper and songwriter from New Kru Town. In 2018, she released her debut single "Bring Back Our Moni", which addresses corruption in Liberia. That same year, she gained recognition after releasing "Pro Poor", a viral freestyle track. MC Caro won Best Female Rapper of the Year at the 2020 Liberia Music Awards. She has released the albums King Caro (2021), My Way (2023), Still Broke (2024), and 4lay active (2025).

== Life and career ==
=== 1996–2020: Early life, "Bring Back Our Moni", and "Pro Poor" ===
Caroline Moore was born on August 10, 1996, in New Kru Town, Monrovia, to parents Christiana Nagbe and Garpu Moore. She quit university to pursue a professional career in music. MC Caro released her debut single, "Bring Back Our Moni", in 2018. Considered a protest song, the track addresses the disappearance of LD$104 million that arrived in Liberia in shipping containers. That same year, she gained recognition after releasing "Pro Poor", a viral freestyle track. The politically charged songs "Pull Up" and "Don't Ask Me" also helped her gain traction; the latter track made Music in Africa's list of the Top 10 Liberian songs of 2020. MC Caro signed a record deal with Smoov HQ Entertainment in 2019, and won Best Female Rapper of the Year at the 2020 Liberia Music Awards.

=== 2021–2022: King Caro, Living Legends, and "We Inside" ===
In 2021, MC Caro was featured in season 2 of Y'Africa, a TV show developed by the Orange Group. Her debut studio album, King Caro, was released on June 26, 2021. It is composed of twenty tracks and features guest appearances from Kizzy W, Nuchie Meek, Boifatty, A. Wood, Pillz, Jaredo, and Eno Barony. In May 2022, MC Caro performed at four musical concerts held across Nimba, Margibi, Grand Bassa, and Montserrado counties. The concerts commemorated the fifth anniversary of Orange S.A.'s arrival in Liberia, and featured additional performances from Kobazzie, Stunna, and Kpanto, among others. MC Caro was one of 52 women featured in the book Living Legends, which was written by Brenda Brewer Moore and released in November 2022. Some of the other women featured in the book include Ellen Johnson Sirleaf, Leymah Gbowee, and Mae Azango. Living Legends was launched at Sirleaf's Ministerial Complex in Congo Town. On December 12, 2022, MC Caro released the single "We Inside", which was produced by Smykid. Reviewing for the blog The Hip Hop African, Sa Vai panned the song's lyrics and said the track isn't the "female empowerment anthem that some conscious rap consumers may be looking for". The accompanying music video for the song was released on March 21, 2023. Conversely, Vai commended the video and acknowledged it for "including some dancing that is extremely American influenced".

=== 2023–2024: My Way, Tidal Rave Festival, and Still Broke ===
MC Caro's second studio album, My Way, was released on January 20, 2023. The album comprises seven tracks and was supported by the singles "We Inside" and "Baby"; the latter track fuses Afrobeats and rap. On the record, the rapper calls out her critics and emphasize her resilience. In March 2023, MC Caro was announced as a brand ambassador for Winners, Inc., a sports betting company. She was featured on rapper Empress P's single "Pressure", which was released on July 15, 2023. The track was produced by Jassie Jozzy and also features rapper M.I.C. MC Caro was one of the headlined acts at the Tidal Rave Festival, which occurred at Caesar's Beach and Resort in Marshall, Liberia. The event was held in December 2023 and featured additional performances from Nuchie Meek, Stunna, and Christoph the Change, among others. MC Caro released her third studio album, Still Broke, on June 9, 2024. It comprises eleven tracks and was produced by T.Que Beatz, Smykid, Rapkid, and the Beat Monk, among others. MC Caro received five nominations at the 2024 Liberia Music Awards.

=== 2025–present: 4lay active ===
MC Caro's fourth studio album, 4lay active, was released on November 28, 2025. It has seven tracks and features guest contributions from Harmonize and Uche.E.

== Artistry ==
MC Caro's music addresses corruption, racism, and discrimination that affect people in Liberia. She uses her platform to advocate for the poor, and has made music to support everyone going through unjust times. Writing for the blog The Hip Hop African, Maia Elise commended MC Caro's individuality and said the rapper does not represent "society's idea of what a woman should be".

== Personal life ==
MC Caro had a girl child who died.

== Discography ==
Studio albums

- King Caro (2021)
- My Way (2023)
- Still Broke (2024)
- 4lay active (2025)

== Awards and nominations ==
MTN Liberia Music Awards

- 2019: New Artist of the Year – Nominee
- 2019: Hipco/Trapco Song of the Year – Nominee
- 2020: Female Artist of the Year – Won
- 2020: Hipco/Trapco Artist of the Year – Nominee

== See also ==
- List of Liberian musicians
