= Tokay Tomah =

- Born: 1968; Buutuo, Liberia
- Died: 2017 (aged 48–49) Paoli, Pennsylvania
- Occupations: Singer, dancer, activist

Tokay Tomah (born 1968, died November 14, 2017) was a singer, dancer, and activist who used performance and the arts to demand disarmament in Liberia.

== Personal life ==
Tokay Tomah was born during 1968 in Buutuo, Liberia, located in Nimba County. She was of Gio descent, one of the sixteen ethnic groups in Liberia. Her father was a prominent Chief, Chief Tomah of Buutuo, and was featured in a book on Liberian arts by art historian Robert Farris Thompson. She was named "Tokay", which means "stay in the house", and was her parents’ sixth and most favored child.

She gave birth to a daughter, Jamah Ndoma, who would become a gospel singer.

Tokay Tomah died on November 14, 2017, while working in Environmental Services the Paoli Hospital in Paoli, Pennsylvania. She was buried at the Saint Peter and Saint Paul Cemetery in Springfield, Pennsylvania.

== Career ==
In 1976 the President of Liberia, William Tolbert, and Peter Ballah, the Director of Culture for Liberia in the 1970s, conducted a tour of Nimba County, Liberia. They observed a young Tomah, who was about ten years old, performing in a traditional dance performance, prompting him to invite her to move to Monrovia and join the National Cultural Troupe. She would live in the Troupe's home base, Kendeja, a performers’ village, where she trained as a backup singer for performers such as Liberian singer Fatu Gayflor.

In 1977, Tomah, along with the other members of the National Cultural Troupe, performed at the Second International Festival of African Culture, located in Nigeria. Following the onset of the First Liberian Civil War in 1989, the National Cultural Troupe’s performances focused on anti-war messages and peace-building lyrics, some of which were composed by Tomah. One of these compositions was later chosen by the Women of Liberia Mass Action for Peace as a theme song, “We Need Peace/No More War.”

Tomah also collaborated with many nongovernmental organizations, including the Liberian organization Women and Society, of which she was the executive director. During the first Liberian civil war throughout the late 1980s and early 1990s, Tomah continued her peace-building efforts through work with the United Nations, focusing principally on disarmament.

Tomah garnered the nickname of “The Queen of the Stage" as well as significant recognition as a result of her mainstream music career. In 2000, Tomah produced her first solo album and in 2001, released her debut record, Chay Chay Poley. Its title track went on to become a hit single. In subsequent years, Tomah produced six albums, including Open the Door, the 2010 hit album, and What You Know About Me, her final studio album, released in 2012. Her music has received awards from the Musicians Union of Liberia. Tomah toured and performed her songs in many African countries, Europe, and the United States.

In 2010, Tomah relocated permanently to the United States, where she, along with other members of the National Cultural Troupe, founded and continued to perform through the Liberian Women’s Chorus for Change in Philadelphia, started in 2013.

Tomah was prominently featured in a 2018 documentary produced by the Philadelphia Folklore Project, Because of the War. The film documents the work of four Liberian performers who use traditional song and dance to engage Liberian communities. Because of the War was directed and produced by Toni Shapiro-Phim, a scholar whose work focuses largely on the relationship between the arts, de-escalation, conflict resolution, and women’s roles in peace-building processes. The film also features three of Tomah’s colleagues in the Liberian Women’s Chorus for Change: Zaye Tete, Marie Nyenabo, and Fatu Gayflor. In the film, when referencing her work with combatants, Tomah states, “I’m going to pass messages over to people who are very bitter. What can I do to make them to turn sweet?”

== Awards ==
In 2014, Tomah received a Leeway Art and Change Grant to craft a traditional Liberian composition and later recorded a music video for the purpose of educating youth in the Philadelphia area about the HIV/AIDS crisis. Additionally, Tomah was granted a Leeway Transformation Award in that same year. In 2016 Tomah was the recipient of a Pew Fellowship in the Arts.

== See also ==
- List of Liberian musicians
