= Upstate United Football Club =

American semi-professional soccer club

- Full name: Upstate United Football Club
- Nickname: Stars Nation
- Short name: UUFC
- Founded: 2020
- League: United Premier Soccer League
- Region: Northeast Region
- Location: Syracuse
- Stadium: Chuck R Wilbur
- Chairman: Richard Beal I
- Director general: Ronny Febres ( Sporting Director)
- Head coach: Ryan McGee
- Manager: Abu Bility

Onondaga FC, formerly Upstate United Football Club, founded as Upstate Lone star Football Club, is an American semi-professional soccer development nonprofit organization based in Syracuse, New York. Onondaga competes in the United Premier Soccer League which sits in the fourth tier of the American soccer pyramid in the Northeast Region's Western NY Conference. The team plays its home games at Onondaga Community College on Chuck Wilbur Field in Syracuse.

== History ==
Founded in 2020 by three Liberian immigrants who had fled a civil war in their home country. The club was named Upstate Lone Star Football Club after the Liberian national football team which is nicknamed the Lone Star. In the midst of the tumultuous COVID-19 years 2019-2020, this group of passionate soccer enthusiasts in Upstate, New York, came together to form a team - Upstate Lone Star FC. The group had a vision of promoting soccer in the region.

Upstate United FC was announced as a United Premier Soccer League expansion team on February 5, 2021. On the day of the announcement, the leadership group was announced with Hanson Goeso serving as president, Thomas Nimineh as vice president, Abu Bility as general manager, and Alen Jusic as head coach.

The team played its inaugural match on May 5, 2021, at home in Utica, New York, at the Accelerate Sports complex against Invictus FC. Forward Elvin Johnson scored the first goal in team history to take lead in the 10th minute, Midfielder Lawson Jellue score the winning goal in the 2-1 victory over Invictus FC. That same year the team had one of its best performance, a 3-2 victory over FCY New York in Buffalo, New York, in front of 200 fans. In its inaugural United Premiere Soccer League (UPSL) season, Upstate Lone Star FC made an immediate impact under Head Coach Allen Jusic, showcasing remarkable talent and resilience on the pitch. The team's relentless effort and dedication saw them finished 4th in the 2021 UPSL Northeast Conference Western New York Division, with a record of 6w-1D-5L in 12 games. During the fall UPSL D1 season the club won both the UPSL WNY D1 and UPSL Northeast D1 Conference championship in the club first season.

== NISA Independent Cup ==
As Upstate United F.C continued to evolve, their on-field prowess reached new heights in 2023. With a squad brimming with talent and tactical acumen, the club had a decent performance under the internship of Hanson Goeso as acting coach, finishing 3rd with a record of 4W-1D-5L. Under his leadership, the club was able to secured promotion backed to the UPSL Premier division. The impressive run in the UPSL earned them an invite to the 2023 National Independent Soccer Association independent cup tournament. In group stages the club face of against UPSL opponent Smugtown F.C in a 1-0 home thriller victory. Next game was against FCY New York in Buffalo, New York, winner of the 2023 UPSL WNY Premier title, Playoff title, and UPSL Northeast Conference title. The game finished in 4-4 draw, which advanced Upstate United FC to the NISA Independent Cup Regional Championship. The match was set between NISA Pro club Flower City Union -Salt City Union located in Auburn, New York, and Upstate United. Salt City Union won the regional title over Upstate United FC overcoming 3-0 deficit to win the title 4-3 over Upstate United. Flower City would go on to also win the National Independent Soccer Association league title.

== Current Staff ==
Upstate United FC has seven people who help run and organize the team; Hanson Goeso (Executive Director), Ryan McGee (Head Coach), Dr. Rick Beal (VP- Director of Operations), Kim Truong (Finance Director), Abu Bility (GM- secretary), Richard Beal (Chairman), Fredrick EruBare (Sales Manager) and Ronny Febres (Sporting Director)

== Roster ==
=== 2024 Roster ===
Player	Jersey number	position
Aaron Huskic	11	D, M, F
Adbulai Barrie	30	F
Aly Kouyate	21	CM
Amani Gasore	4	
Antonio Costa	99	G
Ayodeji Owensi	15	D
Behudin Malkic	25	D
Connor Lynch	13	CM
Emed Luangila	19	W
Ewan O'Dwyer-Hall	9	F
Faraja Loselose	5	CB
Felix Loselose	25	AM
Hamid Alhamid	22	F
Brett Beal	24	D
Jackson Indihafiki	18	DM
Jah Charles	17	W
Jonathan Zamora	10	CM
Joshua Nkengrurukimana	23	W
Juan Herrera	7	W
Keynes Demenus	14	AM
Oliver Greer	2	D
Ryan Lyle	1	G
Yo Abe	12	AM
