= Sundaygar Dearboy =

Liberian musician

- Born: Michael Davies; District 2, Grand Bassa County, Liberia
- Genres: Hipco, contemporary gospel
- Occupations: Singer; songwriter; record producer

Michael Davies, who is better known as Sundaygar Dearboy, is a Liberian singer, songwriter and record producer from Grand Bassa County. He primarily sings in Bassa and Liberian English. Dearboy has released several studio albums, including See Boyer, Don't Live with Woman (2007) and Rebirth (2012). He was named the Liberian Musician of the Year between 2005 and 2006, and has produced thirteen albums to date.

== Life and music career ==
Sundaygar Dearboy was born in District 2, Grand Bassa County, Liberia. He is the father of two and the guardian of several others. Dearboy graduated with a degree in criminal justice from AME Zion College. He is the project manager for Liberia Trading & Investment Company (LINTRACO), one of Liberia's trading groups. Dearboy has a significant following among Liberians in the diaspora, particularly in the United States. He produced "Let Us Vote Ma Ellen", the official campaign song for the Unity Party. It was released during Ellen Johnson Sirleaf's 2005 presidential campaign. For almost four years after the song's release, Dearboy's music career was at a standstill. He revived his career after releasing the single "Bayjay", which won Song of the Year at the 2009 Liberian Entertainment Awards.

In 2007, Dearboy released Don't Live with Women, an album that contains the single "Bayjay" and the song "Evil Genius". Don't Live with Women was sponsored by Cellcom and launched at the Antoinette Tubman Stadium. On May 26, 2007, Dearboy performed at UNIBOA's 17th National Convention in Woonsocket, Rhode Island. On June 10, 2012, he released his eighth studio album Rebirth, which was distributed by RK Enterprises and features guest appearances from Tupee, Carol Kaifumba and Ghanaian artist Odefor. The album comprises seven songs, including "Gbema", "Zima-Day", and the dancehall track "Monkeh". In June 2013, The Inquirer newspaper reported that Dearboy and several other musicians criticized and belittled the establishment of the Arts & Culture Council of Liberia. They said the organization does not, in any way, represent the views and aspirations of the Liberian entertainment industry. On December 13, 2013, he and other Liberian musicians performed at the National County Sports Meet (NCSM) official kick off, an event sponsored by the Liberia National Culture Union (LINU) and the Ministry of Information, Cultural Affairs and Tourism (MICAT).

In 2020, Dearboy collaborated with Takun J, DenG, Tan Tan, Soul Smiter, Odemz, and Amaze to produce the hipco song "Sanitize". The artists released the song in order to raise awareness about COVID-19 and encourage Liberians to practice good hygiene.

== NPFL controversy ==
In 2008, Dearboy admitted to being a member of Charles Taylor's defunct National Patriotic Front of Liberia rebel movement. During the Truth and Reconciliation Commission (TRC) public hearings, Dearboy said he was forcefully enlisted into the NPFL, in 1992, while searching for his girlfriend in Grand Bassa County. Three witnesses stated that Dearboy raped a young woman and murdered several men, women, and children in Grand Bassa County during the civil war. Dearboy denied the accusation and expressed penitence for his role in the rebel movement, saying, "The past is what no one is in control of. No one is reading my mind except God. But I want to say if I hurt anyone during the war, I am sorry, very, very sorry from the depth of my heart. I am sorry for whatever role I played during the revolution."

== Personal life ==
In an interview with Radio France Internationale in 2015, Dearboy said 19 members of his family died from the 2014 Ebola outbreak.

== Awards and nominations ==
Year	Event	Prize	Nominated work	Result	Ref
2009	Liberian Entertainment Awards	Song of the Year	"Bayjay"	Won	
2014	Liberia Music Awards	Artist of the Year	Himself	Nominated	
2014	Liberia Music Awards	Male Artist of the Year	Himself	Nominated	
2014	Liberia Music Awards	Gbema Artist of the Year	Himself	Nominated	
2014	Liberia Music Awards	Liberian Artist in Africa	Himself	Nominated	

== Discography ==
Studio albums

- See Boyee
- Don't Live with Woman (2007)
- Rebirth (2012)

== See also ==
- List of Liberian musicians
