= Kpanto =

Liberian musician

- Born: Franklin Edward Harris; Liberia
- Genres: Hipco; trapco; hip hop
- Occupations: Rapper; singer; songwriter; record producer
- Instrument: Vocals
- Years active: 2014–present

Franklin Edward Harris, who is known professionally as Kpanto (previously Skinnyboi Kpanto), is a Liberian rapper, singer, songwriter, and record producer. He started his music career in 2014 and gained recognition in 2015 after releasing a cover of Desiigner's single "Panda". His eponymous debut studio album, Skinny Boy Kpanto, was released on August 22, 2020. It comprises nine tracks and contains the songs "Take off Trouser", which was nominated for Song of the Year at the 2020 Liberia Music Awards, and "Flukor", which won Song of the Year at the 2021 Tunes Liberia Music Awards.

His second studio album, Sound from the Xtreetz, was supported by the singles "Dey Say" and "Community Thing". It won Album of the Year at the 2021 Liberia Music Awards. Kpanto released his third studio album, Son of the Soil, in 2022.

== Career ==
Kpanto, who previously went by the stage name Skinnyboi Kpanto, released his debut single, "Dope Boy", in 2014. He gained recognition after releasing a cover of Desiigner's 2015 single "Panda". He was previously signed to Holy Records. In 2018, Kpanto was featured on "Bring our Containers Back", a protest song produced and released by AFo4Doe. Recorded entirely in Liberian Kolokwa English, the song addresses Liberia's bank notes that went missing in a shipping container. Bettie Johnson-Mbayo of FrontPage Africa said the singers recorded the song to put an "emphasis on the authority bringing the containers back".

Kpanto's eponymous debut studio album, Skinny Boy Kpanto, was released on August 22, 2020. The album has nine tracks and contains the songs "Take off Trouser", which was nominated for Song of the Year at the 2020 Liberia Music Awards, and "Flukor", which won Song of the Year at the 2021 Tunes Liberia Music Awards. In September 2020, the Music Union of Liberia banned Kpanto's music due to explicit lyrics. Prior to making the announcement, the organization held several meetings to discuss whether his music was suitable for airplay. After the organization's president made the announcement, several artists in the Liberian music industry showed Kpanto support and said they had his back.

Kpanto released his second studio album, Sound from the Xtreetz, on May 16, 2021. It comprises sixteen tracks and features guest appearances from Takun J, PCK, Badman H, Paradise Queen, Primeboy, AFo4doe, Revelation, and Mandingo Priest. The album won Album of the Year at the 2021 Liberia Music Awards. The PCK-assisted track "Dey Say" was released on March 24, 2021, as the album's lead single. The song was produced by Kpanto and has been described as a "party and street banger". It won Collaboration of the Year and was nominated for Song of the Year and Afropop Song of the Year at the 2021 Liberia Music Awards. The Badman H-assisted track "Community Thing" was released on May 9, 2021, as the album's second single. The song won Hipco/Trapco Song of the Year and was nominated for Collaboration of the Year at the 2021 Liberia Music Awards.

In May 2022, Kpanto performed at four musical concerts held across Nimba, Margibi, Grand Bassa, and Montserrado counties. The concerts commemorated the fifth anniversary of Orange S.A.'s arrival in Liberia, and featured additional performances from MC Caro, Stunna, and Kobazzie, among others. Kpanto's third studio album, Son of the Soil, was released on May 14, 2022. The album comprises sixteen tracks and garnered over 390,000 streams on Audiomack as of August 2022.

== Discography ==
Studio albums

- Skinny Boy Kpanto (2020)
- Sound from the Xtreetz (2021)
- Son of the Soil (2022)

== Awards and nominations ==
Year	Event	Prize	Recipient	Result	Ref
2017	Liberia Music Awards	New Artist of the Year	Himself	Nominated	
2017	Liberia Music Awards	Hipco Artist Year of the Year	Himself	Nominated	
2017	Liberia Music Awards	Hipco Song of the Year	"Heavy Weight"	Nominated	
2018	Liberia Music Awards	Hipco Artist of the Year	Himself	Nominated	
2019	Tunes Liberia Music Awards	Hipco Artist of the Year	Himself	Nominated	
2019	Tunes Liberia Music Awards	Collaboration of the Year	"Bring our Containers Back" (with AFo4doe)	Nominated	
2020	Liberia Music Awards	Male Artist of the Year	Himself	Won	
2020	Liberia Music Awards	Hipco/Trapco Artist of the Year	Himself	Won	
2020	Liberia Music Awards	Artist of the Year	Himself	Nominated	
2020	Liberia Music Awards	Hipco/Trapco Song of the Year	"I Eat Your Jue"	Nominated	
2020	Liberia Music Awards	Song of the Year	"Take off Trouser"	Nominated	
2021	Tunes Liberia Music Awards	Artist of the Year	Himself	Nominated	
2021	Tunes Liberia Music Awards	Best Trapco Artist	Himself	Nominated	
2021	Tunes Liberia Music Awards	Song of the Year	"Flukor"	Won	
2021	Liberia Music Awards	Artist of the Year	Himself	Won	
2021	Liberia Music Awards	Male Artist of the Year	Himself	Won	
2021	Liberia Music Awards	Hipco/Trapco Artist of the Year	Himself	Won	
2021	Liberia Music Awards	Album of the Year	Sound from the Xtreetz	Won	
2021	Liberia Music Awards	Afropop Song of the Year	"Dey Say" (featuring PCK)	Nominated	
2021	Liberia Music Awards	Song of the Year	"Dey Say" (featuring PCK)	Nominated	
2021	Liberia Music Awards	Hipco/Trapco Song of the Year	"Infront Them"	Nominated	
2021	Liberia Music Awards	Hipco/Trapco Song of the Year	"Community Thing" (featuring Badman H)	Won	
2021	Liberia Music Awards	Collaboration of the Year	"Community Thing" (featuring Badman H)	Nominated	
2021	Liberia Music Awards	Collaboration of the Year	"Dey Say" (featuring PCK)	Won	
2022	Liberia Music Awards	Artist of the Year	Himself	Nominated	
2022	Liberia Music Awards	Male Artist of the Year	Himself	Won	
2022	Liberia Music Awards	Album of the Year	Son of the Soil	Nominated	
2022	Liberia Music Awards	Song of the Year	"Charger" (featuring PCK)	Nominated	
2022	Liberia Music Awards	Collaboration of the Year	"Charger" (featuring PCK)	Nominated	

== See also ==
- List of Liberian musicians
