= Nyan Dokpa =

Liberian singer (1967–2026)

- Born: 1967; Zahn Banlah, Nimba County, Liberia
- Died: 18 March 2026 (aged 58–59); Ganta, Nimba County, Liberia
- Occupations: Singer; songwriter; guitarist
- Years active: 1985–2026
- Children: 9
- Musical career
- Instrument: Vocals
- Member of: Music Makers

Nyan Dokpa (1967 – 18 March 2026) was a Liberian singer, songwriter and guitarist. Dubbed the Legend of Mano Music, he gained recognition as a founding member of Music Makers, a band that was first active in the 1980s and known for the hit song "Touma and Corlor". Music Makers was led by Hallowanger Gbongbe and is primarily based in Nimba County.

== Early life and career ==
Nyan Dokpa was born in 1967, (Note: According to an article published by The Daily Observer newspaper in 2018, Dokpa was 51 years old.) in Zahn Banlah, Nimba County. His mother was a professional folk singer and his father adored music. He became interested in Congolese music because of his family's love of music. Dubbed the "Legend of Mano Music", Dokpa started his music career in 1985. He was a founding member of Music Makers, a Nimba County-based band that was first active in the 1980s. Known for their hit song "Touma and Corlor", Music Makers was led by Hallowanger Gbongbe, who was popularly known in 1988 as Nimba Hallowanger. The band's first single, "Tumba", was released in 1987 and produced by E. Tonieh Williams. Music Makers recorded songs with Prince Nico Mbarga and his Rocafil Jazz band while visiting Nigeria, and rehearsed for several weeks before releasing the recorded material. They disbanded as a result of Hallowanger's death. All of the band's members sought safety in other countries during the First Liberian Civil War. Dokpa fled to Guinea and returned to Liberia in 2005. He resettled in Nimba County upon returning to Liberia, and released the hit single "Mandingo Drum".

While speaking to the Daily Observer newspaper in 2018, Dokpa encouraged young musicians to establish a union in order to address music piracy in Liberia. The Liberia Intellectual Property Office (LIPO) declared that it would conduct a raid in an effort to stop piracy in the country. LIPO also announced plans to establish creative centers and create a system for royalties to be paid to intellectual property owners. Music Makers reunited several years after disbanding, and embarked on a 5-month tour across the United States. The tour included stops in the North Dakota cities of Bismarck, Fargo, Dickinson, Jamestown, and Williston. Prior to announcing their U.S tour, the group visited five African countries, including Sierra Leone and Morocco.

== Personal life and death ==
Dokpa had nine children and was married. On 18 March 2026, he was declared dead at a hospital in Ganta following a protracted illness.

== See also ==
- List of Liberian musicians
