= Beryl Agyekum =

Ghanaian businesswoman

Beryl Agyekum-Ayaaba
- Born: Beryl Agyekum; Accra, Ghana
- Occupation: Business executive; Entrepreneur, Digital Marketer
- Known for: CEO of Echo House

Beryl Agyekum-Ayaaba is a Ghanaian female digital marketer, Founder and CEO of Echo House Ghana Limited. In 2019, she was named as part of the Top 50 Young CEOs in Ghana by the YCEO & Avance Media. She was nominated and awarded the 2020 Female category of the Young Achiever's Award at the 5th EMY Africa Awards. In March 2021, she was nominated among 30 'most influential' women in music for the 3Music Awards Women's Brunch.

== Education ==
She attended Kwame Nkrumah University of Science and Technology where she graduated with a MSc. in Civil Engineering.

== Career ==
During her school days, she began her career as a creative marketer. It was during KNUST that Beryl's passion for selling – and telling the unique stories often associated with brands. She sold and told stories concerning brands. She collaborated with her friend to start a campus magazine called Echo Magazine in 2008. In 2013, the magazine became a creative marketing agency called Echo House Ghana. Her agency has worked with lots of brands such as Smirnoff, GNPC, Vodafone Ghana, Access Bank, Guinness, ECG, Unilever, KFC, Philips and Samsung and others. She is known for providing opportunities for upcoming and established musicians through lifestyle and music events like Tidal Rave Festival and Epilogo.

== Personal life ==
She is married to Bright Ayaaba who is also COO of Echo House. They married in February 2016 and they have a child.

== Achievement ==
- 2022 Avance Media and Young CEO Awards.
- 2020 Young Achiever's Award at the 5th EMY Africa Awards
