= Tecumsay Roberts =

Liberian musician

- Born: c. 1951; Liberia
- Died: 1990 (aged 39) Liberia
- Genres: Calypso; Pop
- Instrument: Vocals
- Label: Bamboo Records

Tecumsay Roberts (c. 1951 – 1990) was a Liberian singer and dancer. (Note: His name is also sometimes spelled as "Tecumseh".)

== Early life ==
Tecumsay Roberts was born around 1951. He had six siblings, including fellow musician Sandy Roberts. Tecumsay got his start singing in high school in Monrovia.

== Career ==
In Roberts' early career, he fronted a band named Liberian Dream, and circulated performances between Monrovia, Freetown, and Abidjan. The first album he recorded was entitled Gettin' It On. Roberts also recorded the theme song for the 1979 Organisation of African Unity conference in Monrovia. Roberts had also performed in London with another band he led named Boombaya. Roberts' original style was a fusion of African and Caribbean music, dubbed "Afrolypso". This style was prominent in his single, Comin' Home. Roberts also performed pop music. Roberts' popularity in Liberia, as stated by writer Stephanie Horton, was comparable to that of Michael Jackson's.

In Monrovia, Roberts met an American promoter for the label Bamboo Records, who invited him to perform in the United States. Roberts made his debut performance in the country in June 1986 at the Apollo Theater. There, he performed in a ten-member Ozinga, among them the son of famous Sierra Leonean musician S. E. Rogie. Although he was performing among more veteran performers, such as Ras Michael, Gary Stewart of West Africa described Roberts as "the main attraction." Roberts sung and danced during the event. During his American debut, he performed a cover of the Orchestra Makassy song, Mambo Bado. Roberts also performed Woman is Smarter. The event ended with Roberts and Michael together performing Bob Marley's Lively Up Yourself. Upon returning to Liberia, Roberts debuted the song Ma Susu.

== Personal life ==
Tecumsay Roberts supported his mother with his work. On 7 November 1968, Tecumsay's child with Ruth Tolbert Goodridge was born, Tecumsay Richard Adama Roberts Jr.

== Death and legacy ==
During the First Liberian Civil War, Prince Johnson was the leader of a rebel group called the Independent National Patriotic Front of Liberia (INPFL). In 1990, during the civil war, Tecumsay and his brother Sandy were looking for food on the road on the outskirts of Monrovia, when Johnson appeared before them in a car. He invited Tecumsay to come perform for his troops at Caldwell Base. Johnson was wielding a silver pistol at the time. In the base, Johnson commanded General Samuel Varnii to determine the validity of a rumor that Tecumsay was homosexual through inspection of his buttocks. Through this crude method, Johnson and Varnii determined the rumor was accurate. Tecumsay was shot and killed by Varnii within three hours of being invited to the base due to his assumed sexuality. Tecumsay's body was allegedly thrown into the Saint Paul River after his killing. Sandy believes that Johnson is at fault for Tecumsay's killing, and does not believe that Johnson has remorse for his actions, and argues, among other Liberians like Senator Abe Darius Dillon, in favor of the creation a war crime court to try Johnson. As of 2018, Sandy continues to perform Tecumsay's songs.

Johnson explained the details of Tecumsay's death, including the anal inspection and shooting by Varnii to the Truth and Reconciliation Commission in August 2008. On 16 May 2021, during a sermon, Johnson denied allegations of his role in the killing of Tecumsay. Johnson claimed that it was his deputy, General Varnii, who killed Tecumsay due to his supposed sexuality without Johnson's involvement, knowledge, or consent. Johnson claimed to be friends with Tecumsay. Johnson claimed that while he did not approve of Varnii's actions, he did not speak out against them at the time out of fear of creating division in the INPFL. Johnson used excerpts from the book A Nation in Terror by James Youboty to back up his assertions. Johnson accused Senator Dillon of spreading false information in regard to his role in Tecumsay's killing.

A number of musical performances in Liberia have been done in honor of Tecumsay. On November 18, 2015, a concert was held at the Monrovia City Hall Theatre in celebration of the passing of the intellectual Property Law, which paid tribute to Tecumsay. In 2016, an event presented by a Liberian radio station showcased deceased musicians, and was put on in honor Tecumsay among other African musicians. In 2018, Tecumsay was honored at a Liberian music industry awards ceremony, along with other Liberian musicians killed in the civil war.

== See also ==
- List of Liberian musicians
