= Scientific (rapper) =

Liberian rapper

- Born: Samuel Sonnyboy Tubman; March 3, 1983 (age 43); Bong County, Liberia
- Genres: Hipco, hip hop
- Occupations: Rapper; songwriter; performer
- Years active: 2005 – present
- Label: Wonda World Entertainment
- Website: scientific4life.com

Samuel Sonnyboy Tubman (born March 3, 1983), better known as Scientific, is a Liberian rapper and songwriter who is currently based in Ghana. He released the Quincy B-assisted single "Shawty" in October 2014. Between 2014 and 2016, he won Best Hip Hop Artist at the Liberian Music Awards.

== Biography and music career ==
Samuel Sonnyboy Tubman was born in Bong County, Liberia. He grew up in Ghana in a refugee camp due to the first and second civil wars, which lasted from 1989 to 2003 in Liberia.

Cheddar signed Scientific to his label Wonda World Entertainment (WWE) in Ghana.

In 2011, Scientific performed his hit singles, "I Like You Girl", with top Ghanaian acts such as EL, Sarkodie and Jayso at the American musician Fabolous' concert in Ghana.

Scientific was nominated and won Artist of the Year and Hip Hop Artist of the Year at Liberia Music Award, USA in 2014. He also won the 2015 Edition of Liberia Music Award "Artist of the Year".

== Singles ==
- "Her Back Wicked", produced by WWE
- "Ain’t Got Time", produced by Wonda World Entertainment
- "Rotate", produced by Eminike
- "Wake Up", produced by Ghost
- "Its a War", produced by Wonda World Entertainment
- "Feel My Pain", produced by P-Dubb Mancini

== See also ==
- List of Liberian musicians
