= 2C (musician) =

Liberian singer and songwriter (born 1987)

- Born: Romeo Awakanu Mulbah; 16 May 1987 (age 38); Bong Town, Liberia
- Genres: Hip hop; Afrobeats
- Occupations: Singer; songwriter
- Years active: 2007–present
- Labels: Outtaspace
- Website: http://its2c.com/#!bio/

Romeo Awakanu Mulbah (born 16 May 1987), known professionally as 2C, is a Liberian singer and songwriter. He signed a record deal with OuttaSpace Entertainment in 2017 and teamed up with Akon to record the single "Mr. Mechanic". 2C has won several awards, including Artist of the Year at the 2010 Liberian Entertainment Awards.

== Early life ==
Romeo Awakanu Mulbah was born on 16 May 1987, in Bong Town, Liberia. When he was 5 years old, his family was displaced during the First Liberian Civil War. They settled briefly in Ivory Coast before relocating to the United States.

== Music career ==
2C's interest in music and performing began at an early age. He won several dance competitions while residing in Ivory Coast, and also performed at various music events while living in Atlanta. In 2007, 2C teamed up with music producer Jason "Pit" Pittman to record his debut single "Liberia Girl". In 2009, he travelled to Ohio to perform in a showcase that had BET executive Pat Charles in attendance. 2C won the showcase and participated in BET's Wild Out Wednesday competition. Although he did not win the competition, his performance on stage gave him exposure and allowed him to perform throughout the United States and Canada. In 2014, 2C worked with Ghanaian duo Ruff n Smooth to record "I Wanna Be". He signed a record deal with Outtaspace Entertainment in 2017 and recruited Akon to lent vocals to "Mr. Mechanic". On his promotional tour, 2C performed in Liberia, Ghana, and Senegal. In the latter country, he performed at King FM's anniversary.

== Awards and nominations ==
Year	Event	Award	Nominated work	Result
2009	Liberian Entertainment Awards	Best Music Video	"Liberia Girl"	Won
2010	Liberian Entertainment Awards	Artist of the Year	Himself	Won
