= Christoph the Change =

Liberian rapper and songwriter (born 1993)

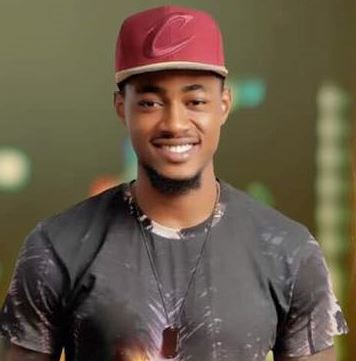

Background information
- Also known as: The Jue Dem Bonnie Dust, Musical Jorweah
- Born: Christopher Nyenga; 10 April 1993 (age 33); Monrovia, Liberia
- Genres: Hipco; hip-hop; trapco
- Occupations: Rapper; songwriter
- Years active: 2010–present
- Label: Massive Entertainment Music Group(MEMG)

Christopher Christoph Nyenga (born 10 April 1993), known professionally as Christoph the Change, is a Liberian rapper and songwriter. After releasing the hip-hop track "Take a Break", he was criticized for sounding "too American". He gained mainstream success in Liberia after releasing the Hipco songs "Papay God", "Heaven and Hell", and "Gbanna Man".

== Early life ==
Christoph the Change was born on April 10, 1993, in Monrovia, Liberia. He attended St. Matthew United Methodist High School. Though apparently living a "lavish lifestyle", he was evicted in 2019 from a rental property for not paying the rent on time.

== Discography ==
=== Singles ===
- "DJ SK" (featuring Christoph Ejoke) (2016)
- "Hold Your Polaruh" (featuring Margas) (2016)
- "Marry Me" (featuring Yung Muse Nest Json) (2016)
- "BYC Anthem" (featuring Quincy B) (2015)
- "Hipco 101 - 105" (2017)
- "Handbag" (2017)
- "Politics" (2017)
- "What Y'all Want" (2017)
- "Hipco and Trapco"
- "Turn Up"
- "Eggs are cook from the Edges"
- "Woomi"
- "Senior Player"
- "Rack 8 Shake 8"
- "Bad Girl" (featuring Revoluxon and T Floyd)
- "Clap for Jesus" (2019)
- "Landlord Daughter" (2020)

== Awards and nominations ==
Year	Event	Award	Recipient	Result	Reference
2015	Liberian Entertainment Awards	Hipco Artist Of The Year	Himself	Won	
2015	Liberia Music Awards	Best Artist	Himself	Nominated	
2016	Liberia Music Awards	Hipco/Trapco Artist of the Year	Himself	Won	

== Career highlights & achievements ==
In July 2025, he achieved a major milestone by being The First Liberian Musician to fill SKD Stadium, filling over 30,000 seated spectators at the Samuel Kanyon Doe Sports Complex (SKD) in Paynesville.

- List of Liberian musicians
