= Joe Woyee =

American drummer

Joseph Woyee is a Liberian singer, drummer, composer and Zoto artist.

== Biography ==
Woyee was born in Greenville, Sinoe County, to a teacher and a medical office worker. After his family moved to the capital Monrovia, Woyee helped establish "The Children of the Green Acres," one of the first bands that played Liberian-style music as opposed to U.S. pop music. In 1980, Woyee moved to the U.S. to attend the University of Minnesota, and, as of 2007, was working in Minnesota and producing Liberian-style music. He once described the newly formed African Union as "a good idea that is guaranteed to go bad."
