= Culture of Liberia =

The culture of Liberia reflects this nation's diverse ethnicities and long history. Liberia is located in West Africa on the Atlantic Coast.

== Languages ==
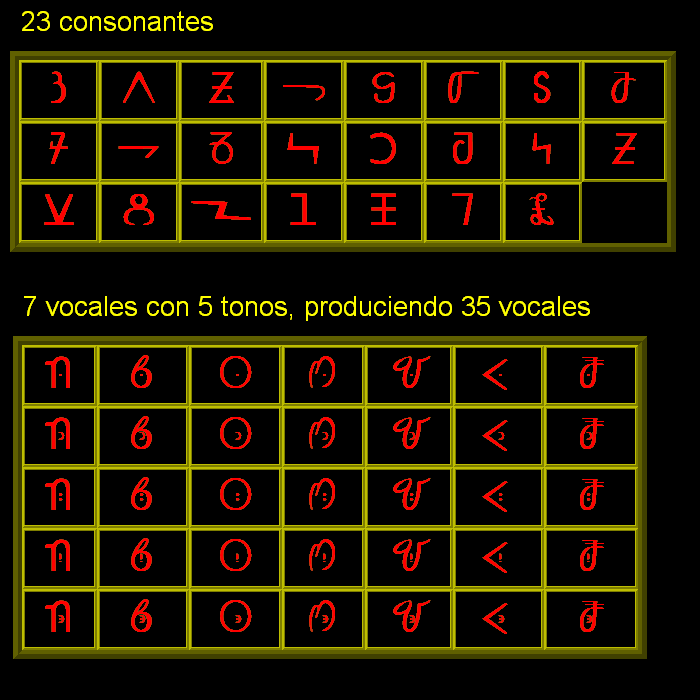
The Bassa Vah alphabet.

The official language of Liberia is English. There are also more than 16 indigenous languages. Among the most widely studied Liberian languages in schools and universities are Kpelle and Bassa languages and to a lesser extent, Vai. Loma and Mende also have their own unique alphabets but are studied less.

Both languages are noted for their unique alphabets and phonetics that are not based on the Latin alphabet, or any European language but emerged from visions of each language's inventor. Bassa alphabet was popularized by Dr. Thomas Narvin Lewis in the early 20th century, after attending studies in the U.S at Syracuse University. He modeled it after he came into contact with former slaves of Bassa origin in Brazil and the West Indies who were still using the alphabet. Vai is another well known ancient script from Liberia, but distinct from the Bassa alphabet.

Among the listed alphabets, Bassa Vah is compared to include Armenian, Coptic (used by Egyptian Coptic and Coptic Church), Avestan used in Ancient Persia to write sacred hymns of Zoroastrianism, Georgian language in Republic of Georgia, Mongolian, Meroitic alphabet of ancient Sudan and parts of Nile Valley, and many other ancient scripts, Greek-based and Cyrillic alphabets. Some Vah letters resemble certain letters from the Ge'ez alphabet of Ethiopia and Eritrea, N'ko alphabet in Guinea, and Armenian alphabet.

The syllabary of Vai also been compared to Hiragana and Katakana scripts also syllabary for Japanese language. However many linguists hold that Bassa and Vai alphabets are unique in their own right for being African languages with alphabets alongside Ge'ez, N'ko, and Tifinagh (used to write Berber languages) that are neither influenced by Latin or Western writing system.

=== Religion ===
According to the 2008 National Census, 85.5% of Liberia's population practices Christianity. Muslims comprise 12.2% of the population, largely coming from the Mandingo and Vai ethnic groups.

=== Belief in traditional supernatural world ===
Regardless of public statements of identification with Christianity, a "vast majority" of Liberians believe a supernatural world of ancestral and bush spirits that impact daily life. Ethnic groups in all regions of Liberia participate in the traditional religious practices of the Poro and Sande secret societies, with the exception of the Krahn ethnic group, who have their own secret society.

"Liberian religious culture is characterised by a predisposition towards secrecy (encapsulated in the concept of ifa mo - "do not speak it") and an ingrained belief in the intervention of mysterious forces in human affairs". "Both elite and non-elite Liberians usually attribute events to the activities of secret powers and forces".

"Beliefs include the conviction that there are deep and hidden things about an individual that only diviners, priests, and other qualified persons can unravel. This presupposes that whatever exists or happens in the physical realm has foundations in the spirit world".

=== Secret societies ===
While still belonging to Christian or Muslim denominations, ethnic groups in all regions participate in religious secret societies associated with the spirit world, including the Poro and Sande gender-based secret societies. The Sande society champions women's social and political interests and promotes their solidarity vis-a-vis the Poro society, a complementary secret society for men. The Poro society is found among the Bassa, Gola, Kissi, Kpelle, Loma, People and Vai of Liberia.

== Polygamy ==
One-third of married Liberian women between the ages of 15–49 are in polygamous marriages. Customary law allows men to have up to four wives.

== Media culture ==
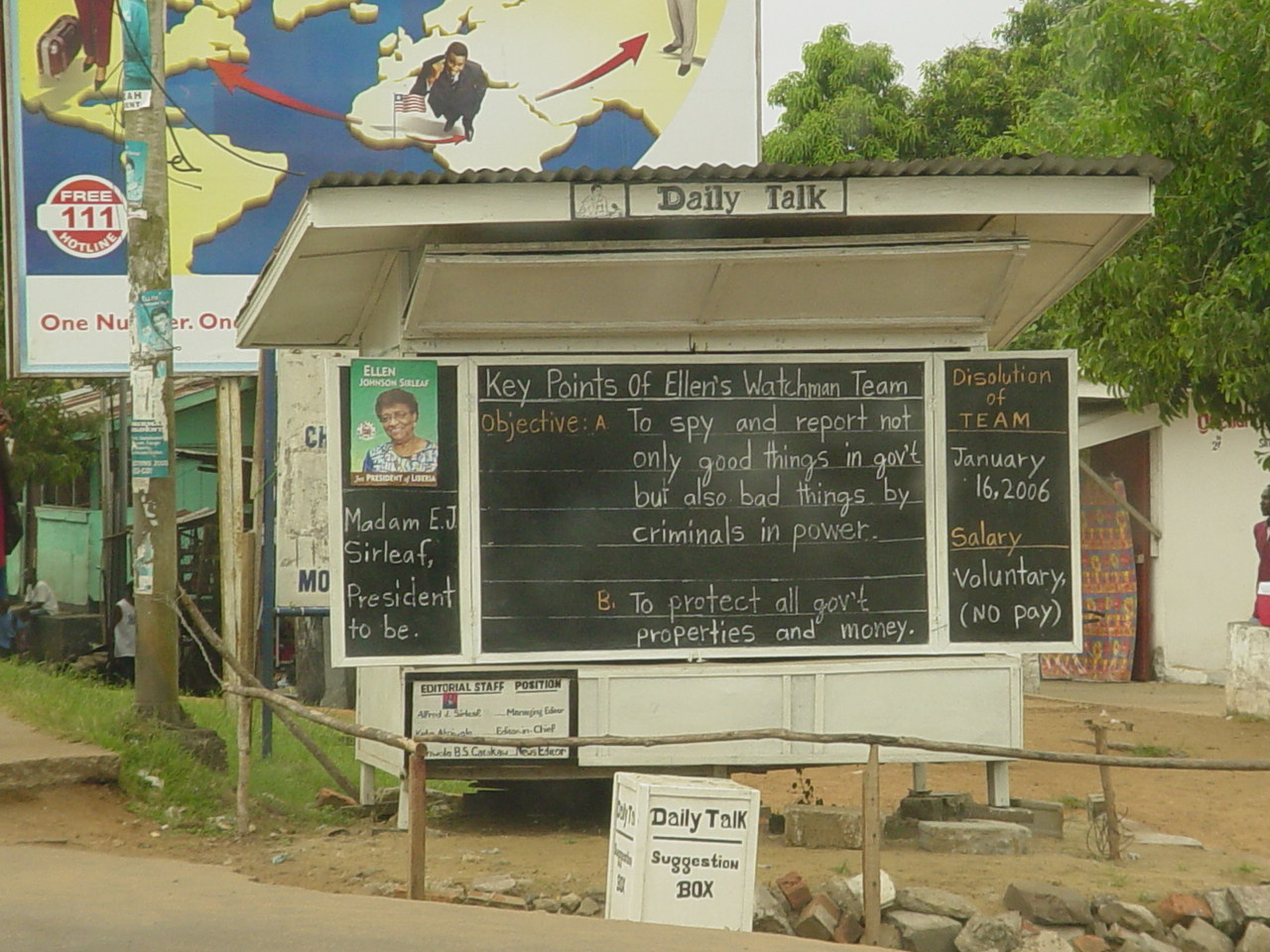
The Daily Talk is a street blackboard announcing news on Monrovia's Tubman Boulevard.

Numerous newspapers, radio stations and TV programs are broadcast and can be heard in the capital Monrovia, coastal cities and towns and countryside. Radio, newspapers and online news articles are the main form of mass communication in Liberia in recent years, surpassing TV stations as the most accessible forms of media to Liberians. Many popular FM radio stations have their headquarters in Monrovia along with several major national newspapers.

Many radio stations are community-based, operated by joint United Nations and community councils, activists, youth groups, universities and neighborhood programs. The major radio stations in Liberia are UNMIL Radio, Radio ELWA, Truth Radio, ELBC Radio, and STAR radio. All have programs available to listen to online. There are currently no AM radio stations (which existed before the war) but there are a few shortwave stations. Radio also serves to promote peace, reconciliation and connect the country both rural and urban Liberians through community based apprenticeship programs for youths and young adults.

A famous news blackboard in Monrovia is The Daily Talk. The Daily Talk is accessible for free. According to The New York Times, the blackboard is "the most widely read report" in Monrovia, as many Monrovians lack the money or the electricity necessary for access to the conventional mass media.

The most widely read newspapers include the Liberia Herald, The Analyst, Liberian Observer, The News, The Heritage, and The Inquirer, among others. Several Liberian journalists have been awarded national and international awards and acclaim around the world for their commitment to press freedom and promotion of Democracy in post war countries and regions.

== The arts ==
=== Music ===
Liberia has its own ancient music and instruments. While Liberian music is part of wider West African music heritage, it is also distinct from its neighbors. There are several different types of drums used in traditional music. Drums are among the most widely used instruments in ceremonies both official and nonofficial, weddings, christenings, naming ceremonies, holidays, graduations, etc. Next to drums, beaded gourd rattles called Saasaa are also used in mainstream music by many Liberian singers, musicians, and ensembles across the country.

Songs are sung in both English and all indigenous languages. Other instruments similar to the xylophone include Yomo Gor. Music is a main highlight of Liberian culture not only used as entertainment but to educate society on issues ranging from culture, politics, history to human rights.

Religious music is also popular. Christian music is heavily influenced by its counterpart in the United States, regardless of region. Islamic nasheeds popular in many countries with Muslim communities are almost unheard of in Liberia. Instead, music for Liberian Muslims is based on Quranic citations, adhan and music related to everyday life called suku. Aside from religious and traditional music, rap and Highlife are widely popular genres, especially with younger Liberians and American music aficionados, and can be heard in discothèques, parties, clubs and on radios throughout the country. Jazz, funk, soul, rap and a new music style or Liberian rap called Hipco combining rap, R&B, traditional rhymes, and joint Liberian and American influences are part of the wider music of Liberia.

=== Crafts ===
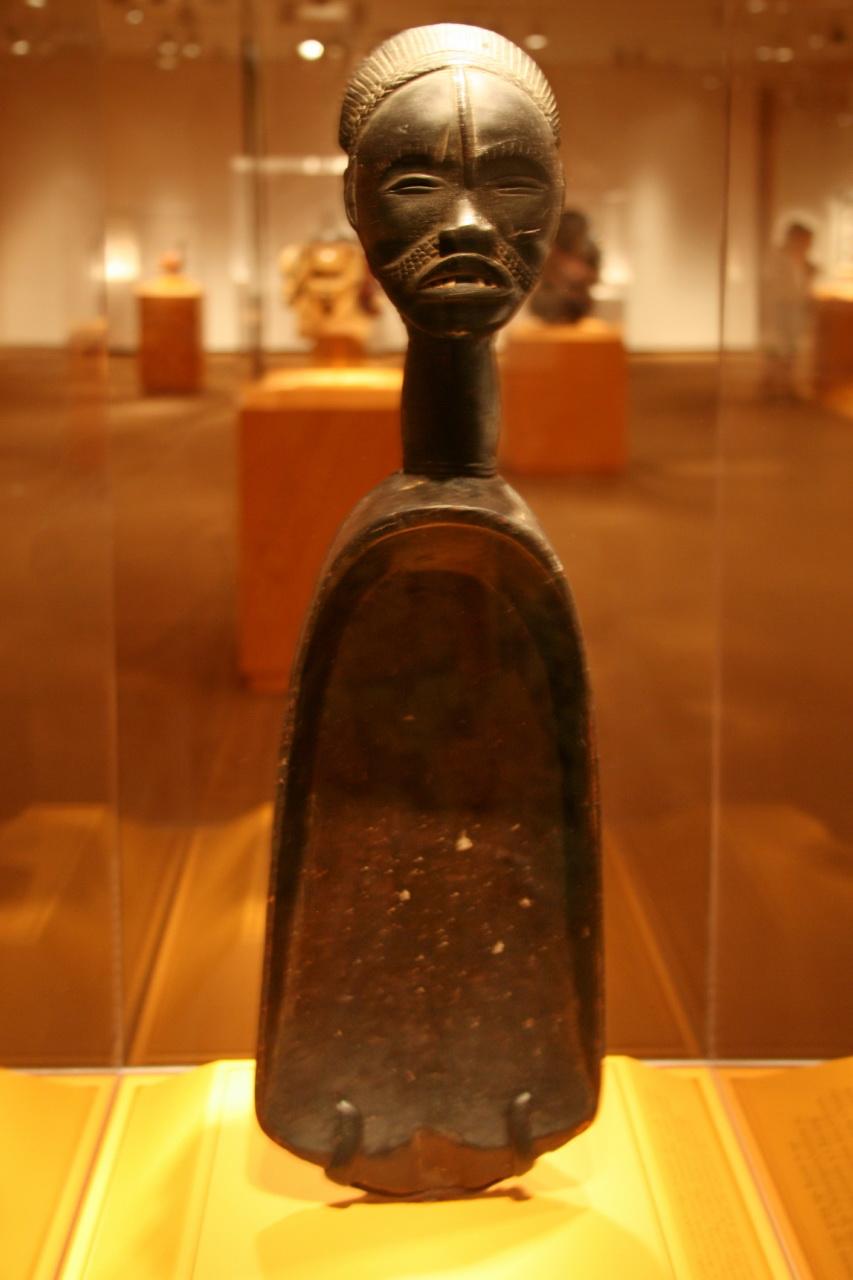
Liberian ceremonial spoon

Liberia is renowned for its detailed decorative and ornate masks, large and miniature wood carvings of realistic human faces, famous people, scenes of everyday life, and accessories particularly combs, spoons, and forks which are often enlarged sculptures. Sculptures are produced in both the countryside and cities. Liberian wood curved sculptures are heavily influenced by ancient history predating modern Liberia, folklore, proverbs, spirituality, rural life and show the artist's strong observations for grand detail and their connections to the people and objects sculpted. Liberian artists both in the country and diaspora have also gained recognition for various styles of paintings in abstract, perspective, and graphic art.

Due to its strong relationship with the United States, Liberia has also produced its own American-influenced quilts. The American free people of color and former slaves who emigrated to Liberia brought with them their sewing and quilting skills and was originally done by Americo-Liberians beginning in the 19th century. Queen Victoria invited Martha Ann Ricks, on behalf of Liberian Ambassador Edward Wilmot Blyden, to Windsor Castle on 16 July 1892.

Ricks, a former slave from Tennessee, had saved for more than fifty years, to afford the voyage from Liberia to England to personally thank the Queen for the British navy's actions against the slave trade. Ricks shook hands with the Queen and presented her with a Coffee Tree quilt, which Victoria later sent to the 1893 World's Columbian Exposition for display. A mystery remains as to where the quilt is today.

The census of 1843 indicated a variety of occupations, including hatter, milliner, seamstress, and tailor. Liberia hosted National Fairs in 1857 and 1858 in which prizes were awarded for various needle arts. However, today, Liberians from all ethnic groups make quilts, although quilting is not as popular as it once was when the country was adapting American customs, culture, and lifestyle in the mid-19th century. In modern times, Liberian presidents would present quilts as official government gifts, and when current Liberian President Ellen Johnson Sirleaf moved into the Executive Mansion, she reportedly had a Liberian-made quilt installed in her presidential office.

=== Literature ===
A literary tradition has existed in Liberia for over a century. Liberia had no written tradition until the 19th century. Numerous Liberian authors throughout the years have contributed to the writings of various genres. They have written on folk art, ancient proverbs, everyday life in countryside, city life, religion and observation of their own lives. Culture, tradition, identity, society, taboo subjects, human rights, equality and diversity within Liberia, multiculturalism, Pan-Africanism, colonialism and its reverberating consequences today, post-colonial African countries and future of the country have been featured in novels, books, magazines, and novelettes since the 19th century. The first novel by an African published in English was written by a Liberian, Joseph Jeffrey Walters, a Vai convert to Christianity studying at Oberlin College in the United States. The book titled Guanya Pau: A Story of an African Princess was published in 1891 by Lauer and Mattil of Cleveland, Ohio, and deals with the issue of child marriage and women's rights.

Poetry is a prominent canon of Liberian literature. Many authors have presented their pose in all poetic styles. Often adding their own unique perspectives, writing styles and observation of the material and spiritual worlds into their books. Liberia's prominent writers also share a variety of genres that cross several decades.

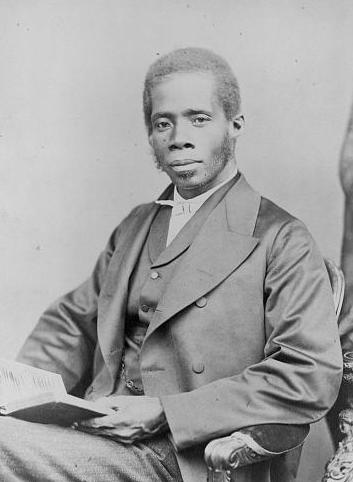
Edward Wilmot Blyden

In the 19th century, Edward Wilmot Blyden was the most renowned Liberian author. A diplomat, educator, statesman and writer, Blyden was considered one of the early fathers of Pan Africanism along with W. E. B. Du Bois and Marcus Garvey. His writings revolved around the need for Africans to develop their own identity, be culturally, spiritually and politically aware of their own potential and preside over their own self-rule and to disprove the European view of Africans as culture-less. These writings inspired many Liberian authors in later years and still do today. A national hero in Liberia, Blyden is known in world history and on the African continent as the genius behind the phrase "Africa for Africans!" and later inspired Marcus Garvey's Back to Africa Movement.

During the 20th century and in the first decade of the 21st century, other authors have taken a less political but prominent role in Liberian literature. Several authors are renowned for their detailed and deep observation of Liberian life both in the country and abroad in the Diaspora in Europe or United States. Authors Bai T. Moore, E. G. Bailey, Roland T. Dempster, Wilton G. S. Sankawulo, have all reflected on Liberian culture, tradition, modernization and the pain of exile, loneliness, loss and remembrance in fiction, and non-fiction works.

Bai T. Moore's novella Murder in the Cassava Patch is required reading for many Liberian high-school students. Published in 1968, the book is based on the true story of a murder, and explores the most taboo subjects in mid-20th-century Liberia as the story reveals the lives of the main characters and their hometown. E. G. Bailey is a spoken-word artist, theatre and radio producer.

Politician and author Wilton G. S. Sankawulo published many collections of poems and stories that later became praised anthologies on Liberian folklore and wider African literary tradition, entitled More Modern African Stories. His most celebrated book is Sundown at Dawn: A Liberian Odyssey. According to the book's publisher, Dusty Spark Publishing, it is regarded as "one of the literary achievements of postwar Liberia and contemporary Africa."

== Cuisine ==
Liberian cuisine has rice as its staple. Other ingredients include cassava, fish, bananas, citrus fruit, plantains, coconut, okra and sweet potatoes. Heavy stews spiced with habanero and scotch bonnet chillies are popular and eaten with fufu.

== See also ==
- Kwi (Liberia)
