= The Daily Talk =

Blackboard news medium in Monrovia, Liberia

Coordinates: 6°17′17″N 10°46′14″W

- The May 24, 2008 board describing former President Charles Taylor's war crimes trial
- Type: Free daily news board
- Format: Blackboard
- Founder: Alfred J. Sirleaf
- Managing editor: Alfred J. Sirleaf
- Founded: May 14, 2000; 26 years ago
- Language: Liberian English
- Headquarters: Tubman Boulevard, Monrovia, Liberia

The Daily Talk is an English-language news medium published daily on a blackboard on Tubman Boulevard in the center of the Liberian capital Monrovia. According to the New York Times, it is "the most widely read report" in Monrovia, as many Monrovians lack the money or the electricity necessary for access to the conventional mass media. Filmmaker David Lalé has stated that "while the global media too often define Liberia in terms of the tragedy of the recent civil war, from its street-level perspective The Daily Talk describes a busy, hopeful nation in the process of renewal."

== History ==
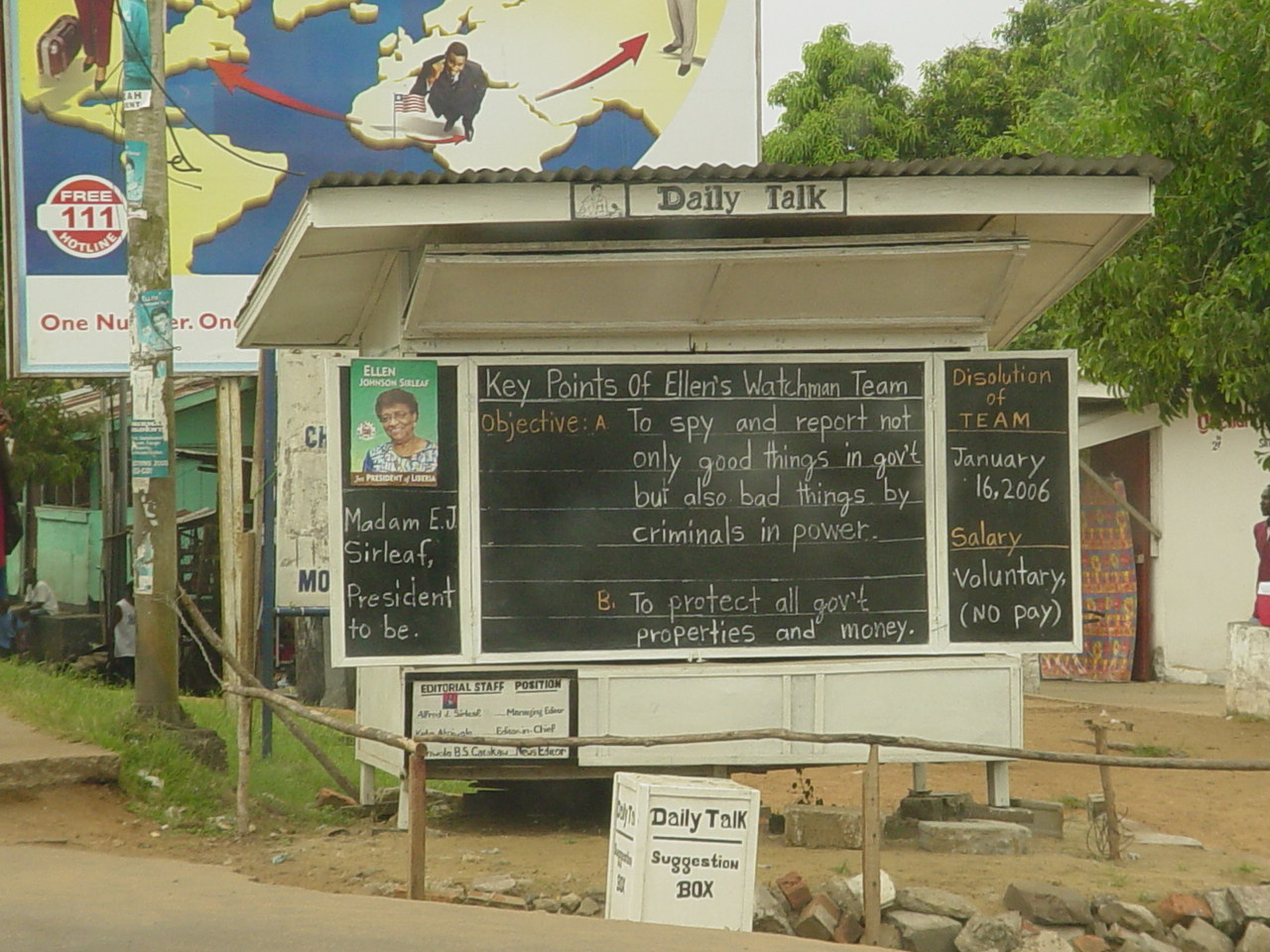
The board in 2006, discussing president-to-be Ellen Johnson Sirleaf

The founder, managing editor and sole employee of the Daily Talk is Alfred J. Sirleaf, an inventor and father of three who founded his blackboard newspaper on May 14, 2000 because of his belief that a well-informed citizenry is crucial to the rebirth of Liberia after years of civil war. In post-war Liberia, Sirleaf sees access to information as the key to peace.

Sirleaf's critical writing about Liberian President Charles Taylor led to him being jailed several months after the board's creation, and the Daily Talk was destroyed by government soldiers. Following a period in exile, he returned in 2005 and resumed writing. With help from his fellow Monrovians, Sirleaf rebuilt it a week before the 2005 election of president Ellen Johnson Sirleaf (not a close relation) and resumed publication of the Daily Talk.

After a vehicle drove into and damaged the board in 2018, US Ambassador Christine A. Elder was present at the reopening ceremony two months later. Funding for the reconstruction was provided by USAID via the non-profit Internews.

== Format ==
Attached to the back of the 10 by 15 feet (3.0 by 4.6 m) chalkboard there is a small wooden shed, the "newsroom", where Sirleaf prepares and writes reports. Lacking a computer of his own, he visits an internet café to read international news reports.

He writes on the board in Liberian English, and adds symbols to assist understanding of stories for those with limited literacy – including a bottle of dirty water for news about oil prices, a blue helmet for United Nations peacekeeping or a devil for the Ebola virus. Colors are also used to distinguish topics, such as yellow for numbers, prominent people and leaders.

The Daily Talk is free to read, with Sirleaf receiving support in the form of occasional gifts of taxi rides and pre-paid cellphone cards. In 2010, he relied on reports from 200 volunteers around Liberia.

== See also ==
- Media of Liberia
