= Dawn Padmore =

Liberian singer

Dawn Padmore (born Dawn Mai Padmore, Monrovia, Liberia, February 17, 1967) is a Liberian classical singer primarily known as a recitalist.

Padmore has appeared in a variety of concert situations featuring African music, including a performance as part of New York's "African Music Symposium" in 2006

In 2007 she appeared at Washington DC's Kennedy Center while, in April 2008, she sang for Nobel Peace Prize Laureate Desmond Tutu in Minneapolis. The Toronto Star described her part in the program as "a series of musical confections smartly wrapped in Liberian-born and New York-based Dawn Padmore's silky soprano" and he concluded: "and Dawn Padmore should be encouraged to visit us as often as possible..."

Her operatic roles have included the Countess (The Marriage of Figaro), Lady with the Cake Box in Dominick Argento's Postcard from Morocco, Elettra (Idomeneo), Sister Angelica (Suor Angelica), the Radical Woman in Chandler Carter's No Easy Walk to Freedom, and Orunmila in Nigerian composer Akin Euba's world premiere presentation of Orunmila's Voices in New Orleans in 2002, where her performance was regarded as "a highlight of the evening".
