= Soul Fresh =

Liberian hip-hop duo

- Origin: Liberia
- Genres: Hipco, hip hop
- Members: JB, Shining Man

Soul Fresh is a Liberian hip hop duo. The Hipco group consists of JB and Shining Man.

== History ==
The group collaborated with F.A. on the track "Ebola is Real", which became popular in 2014 on Liberian radio, Sky FM. The track is done in the HipCo style, and also featured DenG. It became popular on Hott FM and other media outlets throughout Liberia. In August 2014, The Atlantic called the song "...now one of the most popular tracks in Liberia." Soul Fresh was a past member of the Hip Hop Accountability Network (an organization that strengthens copyright laws and establishes minimum play laws in Liberia).

In December 2016, Soul Fresh held their Million Fan Festival on Bernard Beach, bringing in several thousand fans.

== China incident ==
In July 2016, during Soul Fresh's tour of China, it was reported that JB and Shinning Man were imprisoned. The duo were reportedly jailed after accessing their Facebook accounts. However, JB refuted reports and described them as false and misleading. They said they had been detained along with other foreign musicians for ten days after a permit issue.

== Awards and nominations ==
The duo was named Best Group at the Liberian Music Awards in 2014.

In December 2018, Soul Fresh was nominated for Best Hipco Artist at the 2019 Liberian Entertainment Awards.
