= Marshall, Liberia =

Coordinates: 6.148611°N 10.383611°W

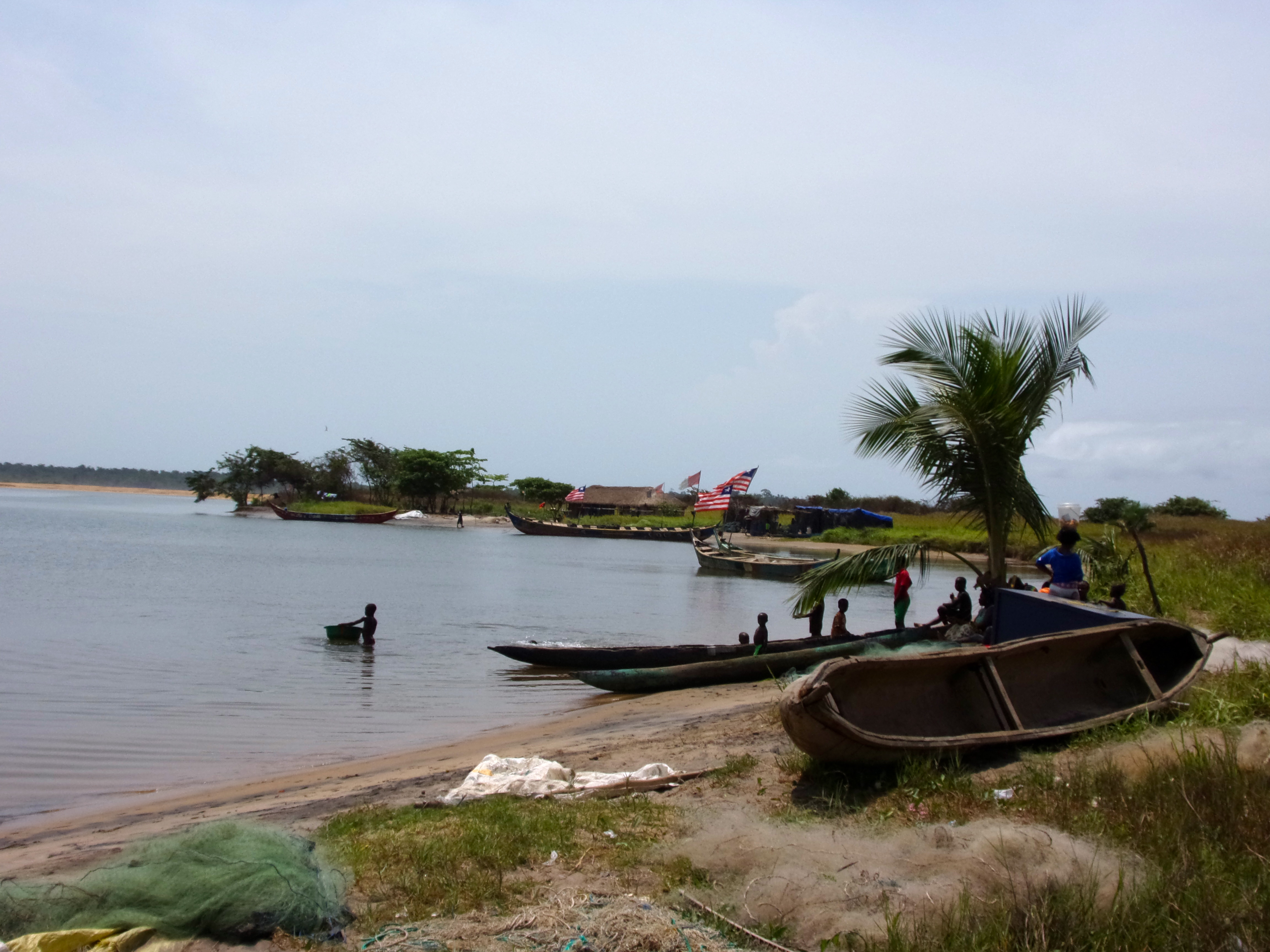
Marshall, Liberia

Marshall is a town in Margibi County, Liberia. It borders the Atlantic Ocean. The Farmington River empties into the Atlantic Ocean near Marshall. Marshall has a population of some 4,000 and was named after American Chief Justice John Marshall.
