= Fatu Gayflor =

Liberian singer (born 1966)

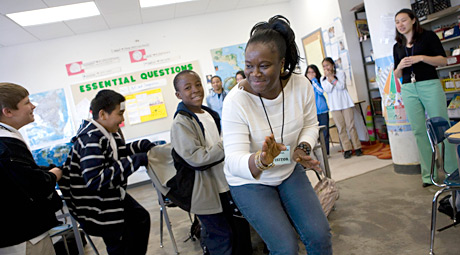
- Gayflor teaching students at the Folk Arts-Cultural Treasures Charter School in 2009

Background information
- Also known as: Princess Fatu Gayflor
- Born: 1966 (age 58–59); Kakata, Margibi County
- Occupations: Singer; songwriter; dancer
- Instrument: Vocals
- Formerly of: Liberia National Cultural Troupe

Fatu Gayflor (born 1966), commonly known as Princess Fatu Gayflor, is a Liberian singer and dancer. Born in Kakata, Margibi County, she started singing at the age of twelve. She is known as the "Golden Voice of Liberia", and was a member of the Liberian National Cultural Troupe. Gayflor has performed at major music venues and festivals throughout the world and has made a number of recordings.

== Life and career ==
Born in the village of Kakata in northwestern Liberia, Gayflor is a member of the Loma ethnic group. As a child she learned the rituals and song of her people and learned to play the sekere as a member of the sande society. In 1978, at just 12 years of age, she joined the Liberian National Cultural Troupe (LNCT) in Keneja. With the LNCT, she learned traditional songs from 16 different ethnic groups across Liberia. She eventually became the group's lead singer and toured throughout the world with the ensemble; notably performing at the 1984 Louisiana World Exposition.

Gayflor made her first two solo albums in Liberia during the mid-1980s. She left the country for the Ivory Coast in 1989 due to the First Liberian Civil War, making her third album while residing in a refugee camp. She lived for a time as a refugee in Guinea, before emigrating to the state of Pennsylvania in the United States, where she currently resides. She has become a fixture at Liberian music events in the Philadelphia area and works with the Philadelphia Folklore Project. She has taught at the Folk Arts Cultural Treasures Charter School, which is sponsored by the Pennsylvania Council on the Arts and the National Endowment for the Arts.

== Awards ==
- 2014 – Pew Fellowship in the Arts, Pew Center for Arts & Heritage
