= Lonestar Cell =

- Type: Subsidiary
- Industry: Telecommunications
- Founded: 2000
- Headquarters: Monrovia, Liberia
- Area served: Nationwide
- Key people: Mazen Mroue (CEO); Benoni Urey (Chair)
- Products: Mobile telephones
- Owner: MTN Group
- Website: lonestarcell.com

Lonestar Cell is a telecommunications company based in Monrovia, Liberia. The company owns and operates the largest Wireless telecommunications network in Liberia, with 48% of the market share in 2011. Founded in 2000 by Beirut-based Investcom, the company became a subsidiary of the South African conglomerate MTN Group following MTN's acquisition of Investcom in 2006. Liberian businessman Benoni Urey is the Chair of Lonestar Communication Corporation and owns a significant portion of the company through his PLC Investments Group.
