= Hipco =

Liberian rap music genre

- Takun J, a famous Hipco artist.
- Other names: HipCo
- Stylistic origins: Hip hop
- Cultural origins: Liberia

Hipco, also referred to as HipCo or just 'Co, is a genre of hip hop from Liberia. It has been described by The Guardian as Liberia's "unique musical style" using "vernacular speech and political messages."

== History ==
Rap and pop music are also performed in indigenous languages across the country, with a generation of artists creating their own style of uniquely Liberian rap music called Hipco (or "'Co"). Hipco is usually performed in Liberian English or the local vernacular, using the style of communication with which Liberians speak and relate to each other. Hipco evolved in the 1980s and has always had a social and political bent. In the 1990s, it continued to develop through multiple civil conflicts, and today stands as a definitive mark of Liberian culture. Hipco music became popular in 2000. As of 2017, it was the popular music genre of Liberia, "serving as the medium through which rappers speak against societal ills, including injustice and corruption."

The "'co" in the genre is short of the Liberian dialect Kolokwa, which according to the Washington Post, "the Liberian underclass has been improvising since the early 19th century, blending the English brought by 19,000 ex-slaves with words from about 15 native tongues to attain a soft-sounding patois. Kolokwa is 99 percent an oral language — as yet, there is not a single full book in the dialect — and it is all but incomprehensible to the American ear. In Liberia, the cultural elite has long shunned it as lowbrow. Which means that when Hipco artists inject a few choice snatches of Kolokwa into otherwise English lyrics, their words have political zing." According to the Washington Post, "HipCo is to Liberia as jazz is to the United States." In 2017, Liberian historian C. Patrick Burrows stated "we're on the verge of a renaissance. HipCo is at the leading edge of it." In 2020, Takun J, DenG, Sundaygar Dearboy, Tan Tan, Soul Smiter, Odamz, and Amaze recorded the hipco song "Sanitize". The artists released the song in order to raise awareness about COVID-19 and encourage Liberians to practice good hygiene.

== Artists ==
Among high-profile hipco artists are Takun J, Christoph the Change, MC Caro and Bucky Raw.

UNICEF has worked with Hipco artists to release hipco songs on Ebola prevention, with several of the songs becoming popular on radio in the country in 2014. The Liberia Music Awards have a Hipco Artist of the Year category. The Liberian Entertainment Awards do as well.

== See also ==
- Music of Liberia
- Cultural effects of the Ebola crisis
