= Liberian Entertainment Awards =

Liberian awards show

- Awarded for: Outstanding achievements in the Liberian entertainment industry
- Country: Liberia
- First award: January 31, 2009; 17 years ago
- Website: liberianentertainmentawards.com

The Liberian Entertainment Awards (commonly referred to as The LEA or simply LEA) is an annual awards show, recognizing Liberians at home and in the diaspora for their outstanding contributions to the Liberian entertainment industry. The annual ceremony, held in the United States, features performances by established and promising artists. The LEA was founded in 2009 by Tarkus Zonen. The inaugural ceremony was held on January 31, 2009, at the Central Piedmont Community College in Charlotte, North Carolina.

== Locations ==
Year	Date	Venue	Host city	Ref
2009	January 31, 2009	Central Piedmont Community College	Charlotte, North Carolina	
2010	January 30, 2010	McGlohon Theatre	Charlotte, North Carolina	
2011	January 29, 2011	Center Stage Atlanta	Atlanta, Georgia	
2012	January 28, 2012	Ferst Center for the Arts	Atlanta, Georgia	
2013	January 19, 2013	Montgomery College Cultural Arts Center	Silver Spring, Maryland	
2014	February 22, 2014	Montgomery College Cultural Arts Center	Silver Spring, Maryland	
2015	February 21, 2015	Howard University's Cramton Auditorium	Washington, D.C.	
2016	March 03, 2017			

== Categories ==
- Best Artist
- Best New Artist
- Best Gospel Artist
- Best Actor
- Best Actress
- Best Filmmaker
- Best Author
- Best Online Radio Personality
- Community Crusader
- Best Hipco Artist
- Best Music Video
- Best Film
- Best Fashion Designer
- Song of the Year
- Best Model
- Best DJ

== Award ceremonies ==
=== 2009 ===
The first annual Liberian Entertainment Awards was held on January 31, 2009, at the Central Piedmont Community College in Charlotte, North Carolina. The ceremony featured performances from Lucky Shango, FA, Black Diamond, C-Needles and Atlanta Dance Crew. Sundaygar Dearboy won Song of the Year for "Bayjay". The music video for 2C's "Liberia Girl" won the Best Music Video plaque. Gerald Barclay won the Best Filmmaker award, while Alexander Sonpon won the Best Event Promoter award. Francis Doe won the Best Athlete award. The movie Imported Bride won the Best Movie category. Furthermore, FA Deline walked away with the Best Artist award.

=== 2010 ===
The second annual LEA was held on January 30, 2010, at the McGlohon Theatre in Charlotte, North Carolina. Elma Shaw won Best Author for her critically acclaimed book Redemption Road. Liberian-American singer Chris Deshield won the Best Artist award. 2C won the Artist of the Year award.

=== 2011 ===
The third annual Liberian Entertainment Awards was held on January 29, 2011, at the Center Stage Theater in Atlanta, Georgia. Jodi took home three awards, including Song of the Year for "Love You". Takun J was nominated twice but didn't win any award. Liberian-based artist Luckay Buckay won the Hipco Artist award. Glorious Lamp International won the Best Gospel Artist award. Benji Cavalli and the Boucantier Royales won the Best Dance Group category. Momo "DJ Mo Mass" Massaquoi won the Best DJ award, surpassing David "DJ Spek Takula" Fromayan. The late Wilton G. S. Sankawulo won the Best Author award. Sekou Jabateh Oliseh won the Best Athlete award, eclipsing former Tennessee Titans linebacker Rennie Curran and three others. The Best Filmmaker category was awarded to Seywon Weah, and the Best Movie category was awarded to Mr Wee Wee.

=== 2012 ===
The fourth annual LEA was held on January 28, 2012, at the Ferst Center for the Arts in Atlanta, Georgia. It was hosted by Natty Skolo and Pam Manneh. The ceremony featured performances from Zaye Tete, Charlotte Wonjah, G-Rize, Infamous TK, Ivan P, BabyEye Taylor, Tru Storry, Nyna Touch, Moses Swaray, George-B and Tomah Tokay. David Mell was the biggest awardee of the night, winning the awards for Best Artist and Best Hipco Artist. Steve Kelly won the Best Gospel Artist award. Killing Me Softly won the Best Movie award, and Prinze Whyee won the Best Filmmaker award. The music video for G-Rize's "I Love My Girl" won the Best Music Video award. Junior Freeman and African Soldier's "Da My Area" won the Song of the Year award. The Best Music Producer category was awarded to Cypha D'King, and the Best DJ award went to DJ 2Risky. Heinz Johnson won the Best Radio Personality award, while Catherine Woyee-Jones won the Community Crusader award. Patricia Jabbeh Wesley, an associate professor of English at Penn State Altoona, won the Best Author award.

=== 2013 ===
The fifth annual Liberian Entertainment Awards was held at the Cultural Arts Center of Montgomery College, Maryland. The 2013 ceremony was hosted by Heinz Johnson and Diamond Sonpon. Takun J was nominated for the Best Hipco Artist award. Somewhere in Baltimore won the Best Film award.

=== 2014 ===
The sixth annual LEA was held on February 22, 2014, at the Cultural Arts Center in Silver Spring, Maryland. It was hosted by Alex Sonpon and Nadia Kehzie. Several Liberian-based artists were nominated, including Takun J, F.A, Sweetz, DSP, Luckay Buckay and Bernice Blackie. Takun J won the Best Hipco Artist award and received a nomination in the Best Artist category. DSP received two nominations, including Best Music Video for "Promise". Beatrice Mulbah took home the Best Actress award, while Montel Swaray won the Best Actor award. The Best New Artist category went to Musulyn Sweetz Myers, and the award for Best Artist was awarded to Munnah. Boys Cry won the Best Film award, and Tibelrosa Tarponweh won the Best Filmmaker award. Xpolay's "Pot Not Balling" (Remix) won the Song of the Year award. Liberian-based Gospel singer Kanvee Gaines Adams won the Best Gospel Artist award. The music video for Queen V's "Jue You Bad" won the Best Music Video award.

=== 2015 ===
The seventh annual Liberian Entertainment Awards took place on February 21, 2015, at Howard University's Cramton Auditorium. The ceremony featured performances from Chris Deshield, 2C, Togar Howard, Bernice Blackie and David Mell, among others.

==== Winners and nominees ====
Best New Artist	Best DJ
Togar Howard; Foreign Ward; Bryan Doe; Pity D'Best; Lady Mouthphy; J.Bre-Z	DJ Ant Flahn; DJ Bossman; DJ Spek Takula; DJ Versatile; DJ Yung T
Best Music Video	Best Film
Munnah - "Celebration"; Peter G - "Too Much"; David Mell - "This Love"; Raw Pekin - "Trouble" (featuring F.E.J); Jodi - "Roni Reloaded"	Gbahtuo in America; Pressure; Trio; Killer Bean and Falcao; Avenger
Best Actor	Best Artist
Artus Frank; Al Johnson'; Josephus Tolbert; Joseph C. Weah; William Dream Debo	DenG; David Mell; Munnah; G-Rize; Jodi

Best Gospel Artist	Best Fashion Designer
Bernice Blackie; Kanvee Adams; Fatu Zeon; Ivan P; Eveine Natt Kamara	Roshe Dezign; Myeonway Design; Patrice Juah; June Damey; Myric Design (Darym Stefie)
Best Model	Best Hipco Artist
Younger Ziama; Valentino Lucas; Akief Sheriff; Sambi Alieu; Daniel Collins	Raw Pekin; Jon Bricks; Takun J; Lil Beshop; Mr Smith
Song of the Year	Best Film Maker
DenG - "They Vex"; Peter G - "Too Much"; Togar Howard Basima Basima; Raw Pekin - "Trouble" (featuring F.E.J); Munnah - "Celebration"	Courage Borbor; Alfred Musa Dukuly; Richard Dwoumah; Tibelrosa T; Alexander Wiaplah

Community Crusader
YOTAN Liberia
Trokon Glay
Karen Koukou Twaglee
Bill Rodgers
Brenda Brewer

== See also ==
- Music of Liberia
