= Liberian Observer =

Liberian newspaper

The Liberian Observer or Daily Observer Newspaper is a newspaper published in Liberia. Based in Monrovia, The Liberian Observer Corporation was founded by Mr. and Mrs. Kenneth Y. Best in 1981. An independent newspaper, it states that its goals are government accountability and popular awareness of current events.

It is noted for sometimes publishing highly controversial articles or stories on current events, officials and other.

In 2021, the paper celebrated its 40th anniversary.

== See also ==
- List of newspapers in Liberia
