= Tunes Liberia Music Awards =

- Awarded for: Outstanding achievements in the music industry of Liberia
- Country: Liberia
- Presented by: Tunes Liberia
- First award: 2018; 8 years ago
- Website: tunesliberia.com

The Tunes Liberia Music Awards (also referred to as MLA Awards) is a Liberian music awards ceremony organized for musical accomplishments in the Liberia music industry, the awards ceremony was established in 2018. The winners receive a gold-plated statuette.

== See also ==
- Website
