= Liberia Music Awards =

- Awarded for: Outstanding achievement by artists, disc jockeys and promoters from across Liberia and the diaspora
- Country: Liberia
- Presented by: Liberia Music Awards Foundation
- First award: June 14, 2014; 12 years ago
- Final award: 2023
- Website: liberiamusicawards.com

The Liberia Music Awards, commonly known as the MTN Liberia Music Awards (or simply MLMAs), is an annual music award show held to celebrate musicians in Liberia and in the diaspora. The first Liberia Music Awards ceremony was held on June 14, 2014, at the Gwinnett Performing Arts Center in Atlanta, Georgia.

== Categories ==
The following are the categories for the ceremony:

- Collaboration of the Year
- Hipco/Trapco Song of the Year
- Traditional/Gbema Artist of the Year
- Video Director of the Year
- Song of the Year
- Hipco/ Trapco Artist of the Year
- International Artist of the Year
- Video Of The Year
- Afro Pop Song of the Year
- Afro Pop Artist of the Year

- Female Artist of the Year
- Male Artist of the Year
- Producer of the Year
- DJ of the Year
- Reggae/Dancehall Artist of the Year
- New Artist of the Year
- Album of the Year
- Hip Hop Artist of the Year
- Gospel Artist of the Year
- Artist of the Year
