= Mass media in Liberia =

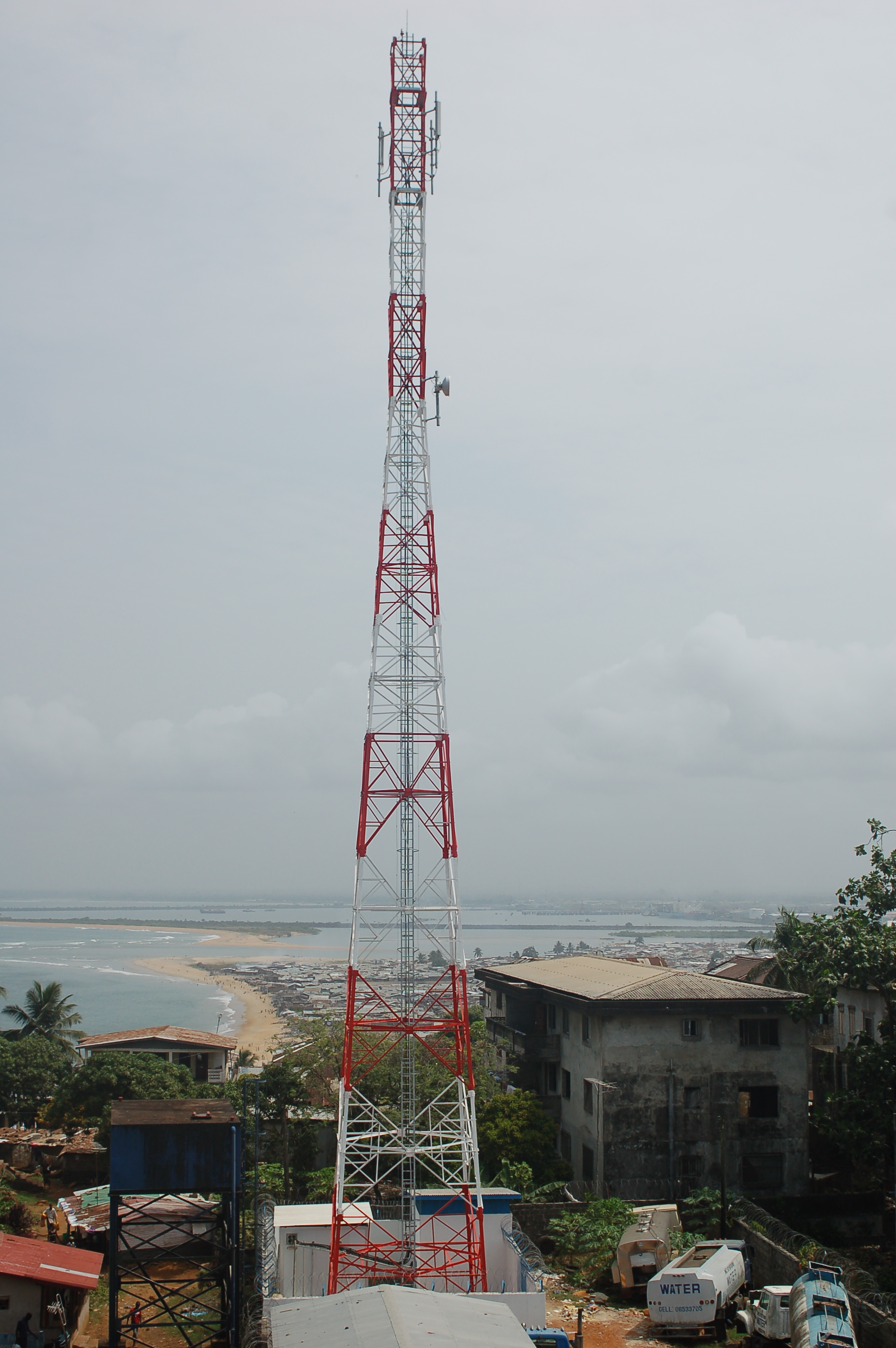
A Cellcom Liberia antenna in Monrovia, 2009

Mass media in Liberia includes the press, radio, television, fixed and mobile telephones, and the Internet. Much of Liberia's communications infrastructure was destroyed or plundered during their first and second civil wars (1989–1996 and 1999–2003). With low rates of adult literacy and high poverty rates, television and newspaper use is limited, leaving radio as the predominant means of communicating with the public. Even as it struggles with economic and political constraints, Liberia's media environment is expanding due to the number of registered newspapers and radio stations (many of them community stations) on the rise despite limited market potential. Along with this, politically critical content and investigative pieces also get published or broadcast.

== Press ==
The main newspapers are:

- The Analyst
- Pumah Times Newspaper
- Daily Observer (est. 1981), private.
- The Daily Talk
- FrontPage Africa, private.
- The Inquirer, private daily.
- National Chronicle
- The New Dawn, private daily.
- New Democrat

Defunct newspapers and magazines include:

- Africa League
- African Nationalist
- Africa's Luminary (est. 1839)
- Amulet (est. 1839)
- Daily Listener (est. 1950)
- Footprints Today (est. 1984)
- Geez Liberia
- The Friend
- Independent Weekly
- Journal of Commerce and Industry
- Liberia and West Africa (ceased in 1932)
- Liberia Herald (est. 1826)
- Liberian Age (est. 1946)
- Liberian Herald
- Liberian News
- Liberian Recorder (est. 1897)
- Liberian Star (est. 1839)
- Monrovia Observer (est. 1878)
- Palm Magazine
- SunTimes
- Weekly Mirror
- Whirlwind

== Radio ==
- Radios: 790,000 radio receivers (1997).
- Radio stations: 1 state-owned radio station, but no national public service broadcaster; about 15 independent radio stations broadcasting in Monrovia, with another 25 local stations operating in other areas; transmissions of 2 international broadcasters are available (2007).
  - BBC World Service 103 FM.
  - ELBC FM, public.
  - Amazing Buffalo 94.1 FM, operated by Buffalo Investments/ Amazing Broadcast Group (CEO Ojimba I. Davies)
  - ELWA FM and SW, private, religious-Christian.
  - OK FM
  - Pumah FM 106.3
  - LUX 106.6 FM, University of Liberia.
  - Radio Liberia FM, operated by the state-run Liberian Broadcasting System (LBS).
  - Radio Veritas FM and SW, religious-Catholic.
  - RFI English FM, the English service of Radio France Internationale.
  - Sky FM
  - STAR Radio FM and SW, operated in partnership with Swiss-based Hirondelle Foundation.
  - Truth FM
  - UNMIL Radio FM, operated by the United Nations mission.
  - Voice of Firestone Liberia 89.5 FM

== Television ==
- Television sets: 70,000 sets (1997).
- Pumah TV Channel 4
- Television stations: 4 private TV stations, none with national reach; satellite TV service available (2007).
  - Clar TV, private.
  - DC TV, private.
  - Power TV, private.
  - Real TV, private.
- Liberia Broadcasting System: Government owned Liberia National Television (LNTV).

== Telephones ==
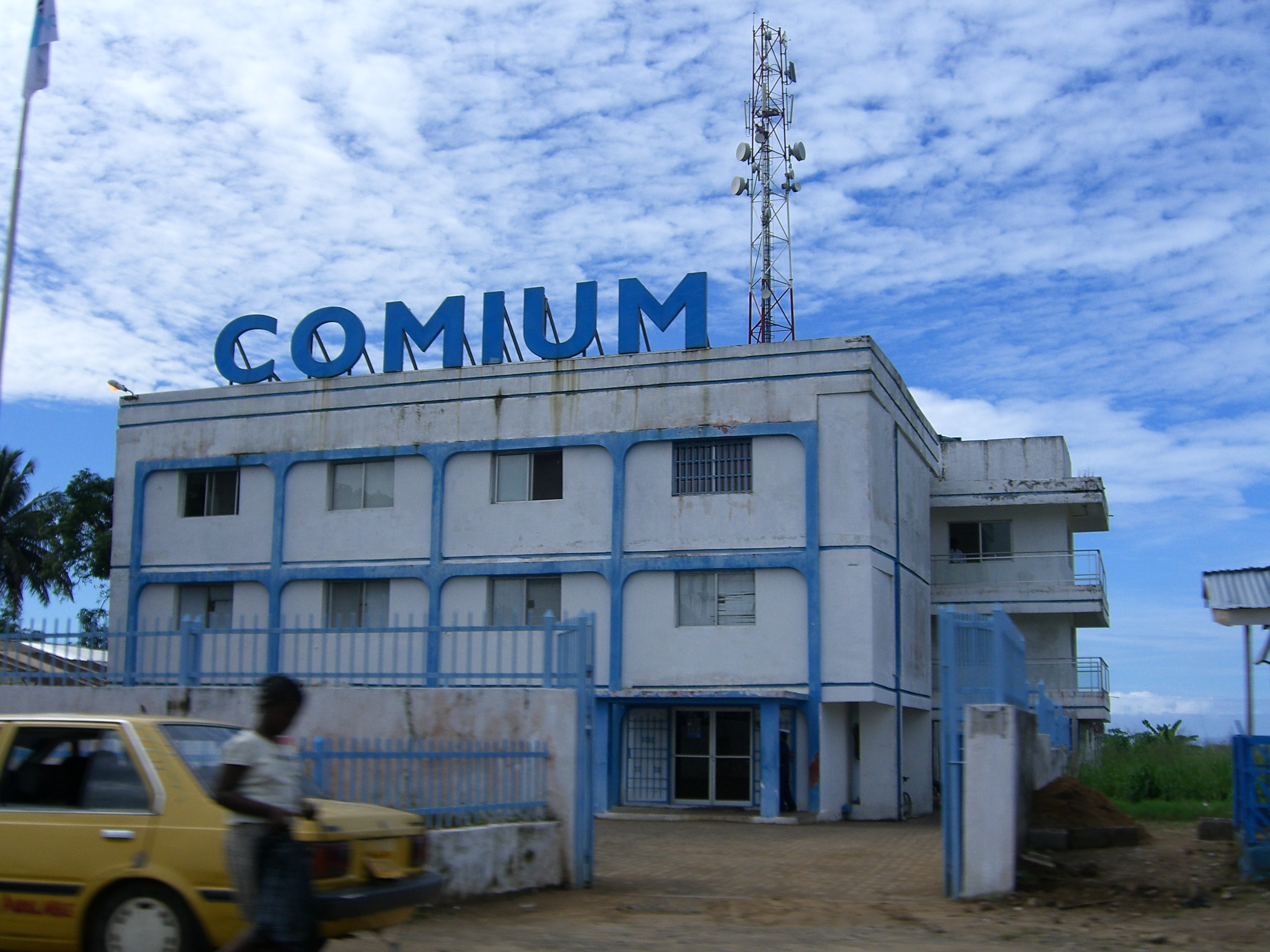
The Comium mobile phone building (2006).

- Calling code: +231
- International call prefix: 00
- Main lines: 3,200 lines in use, 213th in the world (2011).
- Mobile cellular: 2.4 million lines, 138th in the world (2012).
- Telephone system: the limited services available are found almost exclusively in the capital Monrovia; fixed-line service stagnant and extremely limited; telephone coverage extended to a number of other towns and rural areas by four mobile-cellular network operators; mobile-cellular subscription base growing and teledensity reached 50 per 100 persons (2011).
- Satellite earth stations: 1 Intelsat (Atlantic Ocean) (2010).
- Communications cables: Africa Coast to Europe (ACE) cable system, links countries along the west coast of Africa to each other and on to Portugal and France.

The fixed line infrastructure of Liberia was nearly completely destroyed during the civil wars (1989-1996 and 1999–2003).

Prior to the passage of the Telecommunications Act of 2007, the state-owned Liberia Telecommunications Corporation (LIBTELCO) held a legal monopoly for all fixed line services in Liberia, and remains the sole licensed fixed line telephone service provider in the country.

Following the liberalization of Liberia's telecommunications sector in the 2000s, private investment and mobile network expansion significantly increased access to communications services across the country. The sector remains constrained by unreliable electricity, limited domestic fiber infrastructure, and high operating costs, particularly outside Monrovia.

Two major GSM cellular mobile service providers operate in Liberia: Lonestar Cell MTN and Orange Liberia.

== Internet ==
The landing of the Africa Coast to Europe (ACE) submarine cable significantly improved Liberia's international connectivity and broadband capacity. The expansion of mobile broadband services increased internet access, although service quality and affordability remained major constraints, particularly in rural areas.

In January 2025, the Liberia Telecommunications Authority granted a one-year provisional license to Starlink, the satellite internet service operated by SpaceX, to provide nationwide internet services in Liberia. The introduction of satellite broadband services expanded internet access options in rural and underserved parts of the country.

- Top-level domain: .lr
- Internet users: approximately 1.84 million users, representing 32.4% of the population (2025).
- Fixed broadband: 14,759 subscriptions (2022).
- Mobile broadband: approximately 2.37 million active subscriptions (2024).

=== Internet censorship and surveillance ===
There are no government restrictions on access to the Internet or reports that the government monitors e-mail or Internet chat rooms.

The constitution provides for freedom of speech and press, and the government generally respects these rights in practice. Libel and national security laws place some limits on freedom of speech. Individuals can generally criticize the government publicly or privately without reprisal. Some journalists practice self-censorship. The constitution prohibits arbitrary interference with privacy, family, home, or correspondence, and the government generally respects these prohibitions in practice.

President Sirleaf endorsed and signed the World Association of Newspapers and News Publishers' Declaration of Table Mountain in Monrovia on 21 July 2012, committing to the core principles of a free press and calling for the repeal of the criminal defamation and insult laws regularly used against journalists.

== See also ==
- Liberia Telecommunications Corporation, the sole provider of fixed line telephone services in Liberia.
- Cable Consortium of Liberia, a public-private partnership formed in 2010 to own and operate Liberia's cable landing point for the ACE cable system.
- The Liberian Journal, a US-based Liberian online and print news organization covering issues of interest to Liberians in the Diaspora.
- Cinema of Liberia
