= List of radio stations in Liberia =

The following is a partial list of radio stations in Liberia. Liberia has many local radio stations, many of them broadcasting in regional languages, of which there are more than 30. Some stations may be missing from this list; others may be listed more than once if they were referred to by more than one name by different sources.

- Pumah FM 106.3
- Amazing Buffalo 94.1 FM
- Crystal FM
- DC 101
- ELBC Radio
- ELWA
- Gbaisue Radio
- Jam Radio
- King's FM
- LCBN
- Liberia Broadcasting System
- Liberia Communication Network (defunct?)
- Life Zorzor
- Love FM
- Magic FM
- OK FM
- Peace FM (same as below?)
- Peace Radio
- Power FM
- Radio Barrobo
- Radio Beaganlay
- Radio Bomi
- Radio Bong Mine
- Radio Cape Mount
- Radio Dukpa
- Radio Flumpa
- Radio Gbarnga
- Radio Gbartala
- Radio Gbehzohn
- Radio Gee
- Radio Grand Kru
- Radio Harleygee (same as below?)
- Radio Harlengnee
- Radio Harleyike
- Radio Harper
- Radio Jorwah
- Radio Jorwai
- Radio Joy Africa
- Radio Kakata
- Radio Karhn (same as below?)
- Radio Karn
- Radio Kergheamahn
- Radio Kintoma
- Radio Kpo
- Radio Kwageh
- Radio Liberia International (defunct?)
- Radio Life
- Radio Montserrado
- Radio Nimba
- Radio Peace
- Radio Piso
- Radio Saboyea
- Radio Saclepea
- Radio Salala (same as "Salala Broadcasting Service" below?)
- Radio Sanweih
- Radio Sass Town
- Radio Shalom
- Radio Smile
- Radio Super Bongese
- Radio Tamba Taikor (same as "(Radio) Tamba Taykor" below?)
- Radio Tappita
- Radio Totota
- Radio Veritas
- Radio Webbo
- Radio Ylamba
- Radio Zota
- Rivercess Broadcasting Service
- Salala Broadcasting Service
- STAR Radio
- Sawu FM
- Sky FM
- Smile FM
- (Radio) Tamba Taykor
- Truth FM
- UNMIL Radio
- Voice of Gompa
- Voice of Hope
- Voice of Pleebo
- Voice of Reconciliation
- Voice of RM
- Voice of Sinoe
- Voice of Tappita
- Voice of Webbo
- Voice FM
- Y-Echo
- Y-FM
- HOTT FM

== See also ==
Flash Radio 102.2 Add a radio station

- List of newspapers in Liberia
- Communications in Liberia
