= CCL =

CCL may refer to:

== Brands, enterprises, and organizations ==
- Cable Consortium of Liberia
- Lima Chamber of Commerce (Cámara de Comercio de Lima), a Peruvian business organisation
- Canadian Congress of Labour, a Canadian trade union federation
- Carnival Corporation, stock ticker symbol
- Carnival Cruise Line
- Caribbean Congress of Labour
- CCL Industries Inc., a Toronto, Ontario-based company
- Central Coalfields
- Christian Copyright Licensing International, a company that sells copyrighted works for use in worship services
- Citizens' Climate Lobby, an international environmental group seeking to accelerate the transition from fossil fuels to renewable energy using carbon pricing
- Commonwealth Countries League, a civil society organization
- Couple to Couple League, an international organization teaching natural family planning
- Center for Civil Liberties (human rights organization), a Ukrainian human rights organization

== Computing and technology ==
- Cerner CCL (Cerner Command Language), a SQL-like programming language developed by Cerner Corporation
- Clozure CL, a Common Lisp implementation
- Communications Controller for Linux, an IBM networking software product
- Concise Command Language (CCL), a DEC command line interpreter for PDP-8, 10, 11

== Educational institutions and libraries ==
- Christ College of Law, Bangalore, India
- Christchurch City Libraries, New Zealand
- Chung Chi Library, a university library of the Chinese University of Hong Kong
- Cross Campus Library, the former name of Yale University's Bass Library

== Laws and regulations ==
- Climate Change Levy, a tax on energy delivered to non-domestic consumers in the United Kingdom
- Code of Canon Law (disambiguation), the law of the Latin Church of the Catholic Church
- Commerce Control List, a short name for Supplement No 1 to Part 774 of the US Export Administration Regulations
- Concealed Carry License, the ability to carry a concealed weapon in some states of the US
- Contaminant candidate list, a regulatory process for protecting drinking water in the United States
- Creative Commons License, a set of public copyright licenses that enable the free distribution of an otherwise copyrighted work

== Science and mathematics ==
- CC chemokine ligand
- Computational Chemistry List
- Conjugacy class, a mathematical concept in group theory
- Connected Component Labeling, an algorithmic application of graph theory
- Convective condensation level
- Copper-clad laminates, key materials for making printed circuit boards (PCBs)
- Corneal collagen cross-linking, also known as CCL

== Sports ==
- CAF Champions League, an annual African club football (soccer) competition
- California Collegiate League, a US amateur baseball league featuring collegiate players on summer assignment
- Catholic Central League, a high school athletic conference in the Massachusetts Interscholastic Athletic Association
- Celebrity Cricket League, a cricket tournament in India between teams representing regional film industries of India
- Chicago Catholic League, a high school athletic conference in Illinois
- China Chess League
- Citrus Coast League, a high school athletic conference in California
- Coastal Canyon League, a high school athletic conference in California
- Collegiate Champions League, a basketball league in the Philippines
- Combined Counties Football League, a football league in England
- CONCACAF Champions League, a former annual North, Central American and Caribbean club football (soccer) competition, since rebranded to CONCACAF Champions Cup.

== Other uses ==
- 250, in Roman numerals
- Chatham County Line, an American bluegrass musical group
- ChristChurch London, an evangelical Christian church in London, UK
- Circle Line (Singapore), in Singapore
- Chinchilla Airport, IATA airport code "CCL"
