= Rodney Sieh =

Liberian newspaper editor

- Occupation: Journalist
- Organization: FrontPage Africa

Rodney Sieh is a Liberian newspaper editor. In 2005, he founded FrontPage Africa. Originally an online-only publication, the newspaper began to print daily copies in 2008, expanding to a circulation of 1,500, which were collated and folded manually.

FrontPage Africa, Sieh, and reporter Samwar Fallah were sued for libel in 2010 by Christopher Toe, a former Agriculture Minister, who demanded US$2 million in damages; the newspaper had reported that he had embezzled millions of dollars from public funds. The World Association of Newspapers issued a statement on the paper's behalf, stating that while it had no opinion on the merits of the case itself, the amount sought was clearly punitive. The three parties were found guilty and ordered to pay the full amount.

In July 2011, Sieh was notified by a government official that former government minister Willis Knuckles was attempting to have him assassinated, in retaliation for Sieh's role in reporting the sex scandal that had forced his 2007 resignation.

In August 2013, Sieh was imprisoned after he was unable to pay $1.5 million in libel damages awarded to a government minister who had been sacked for corruption.

Sieh was featured in a Liberia-focused episode of WNYC's program On the Media, released on December 12, 2014. Sieh has also employed some of the best women journalist in Liberia, namely; Mae Azango, Tecee Boley and Wade Williams. He and his establishment has been a long-term partner of "New Narratives".
