= Press Union of Liberia =

Journalism organization in Liberia

The Press Union of Liberia was founded on September 30, 1964, by a group of independent journalists. It serves as an umbrella organization for media professionals and institutions to advocate for press freedom and the legal protection of journalists.

The PUL collaborates with local, national and international organizations including the Liberian Ministry of Information, International Federation of Journalists (IFJ), West African Journalists Association (WAJA) and the Committee to Protect Journalists (CPJ).

== Leadership ==
A board of elected officials composed of a president, vice president, secretary general and assistant secretary general leads the PUL. Five permanent committees oversee PUL functions and facilitate discussions about journalistic practice. These include: Media Complains/Grievance & Ethics, Membership, Welfare, Intellectual Discourse/Press Club and Sports & Entertainment. General PUL members also make up the Congress, which is the Union's official decision-making body. In annual meetings, members discuss what issues the Union should prioritize.

The PUL website boasts more than 500 journalists as members under its umbrella. Full membership is granted to Liberian journalists with degrees in journalism or mass communication and who have practiced for two years. Foreign media personnel are often offered associate membership and organizations like the Sports Writers Association of Liberia and the Economic Journalists Association receive institutional membership.

== History ==
By the time the PUL formed in 1964, a rapid growth of military forces in the 1940s created an environment where the government became the largest purveyor of news. The only significant outlet beyond direct government control was ELWA, a religious radio station operated by American missionaries.

In the 1980s, the Samuel Doe regime routinely threatened journalists. Gabriel I. H. Williams, a leader at the PUL during this time, said: "We had to advocate for freedom of speech and the press and respect for the rule of law. ... We were just ordinary guys doing what we had to do, and all of a sudden you face death. I was so scared."

The Liberian Civil Wars, from 1989 to 1996 and 1999 to 2003, led to journalist deaths and exiles and the closure of many media institutions. During the early years of the first war, for example, former secretary general of the PUL R. Jaryeneh Moore was murdered in Monrovia.

Some journalists, fearing Doe's death squads, broadcast propaganda for Charles Taylor's National Patriotic Front of Liberia (NPFL), via the Liberia Broadcasting System (LBS), the state-owned radio network.

A division was created within the PUL between those in Gbarnga, the northeastern city that was home to Taylor's rebel group, who were recognized by the NPFL, and those in Monrovia who claimed no allegiance to Taylor or any party attempting to gain control of the country by force. The Monrovia-based Press Union continued to criticize violence against and exiles of foreign media correspondents who came to cover the wars. Despite the war, one of the country's more prominent independent newspapers, the Inquirer, was founded in 1991 during the conflict. The secretary general of the PUL at the time, Gabriel I. H. Williams, helped found and edit the publication.

Taylor's election in 1997 came with a brief pause in the war, but his rule included many human rights abuses, which the media were pressured to avoid. There were a number of arrests and closures of several radio stations. Members of the PUL were forced to flee the country during the war. Several of these journalists eventually formed the Association of Liberian Journalists in the Americas (ALJA). An assessment written by the Press Union in 2003, after Taylor's rule, said media institutions were looted during the fighting and had to focus on rebuilding what was lost.

The 2005 and 2011 elections, both won by President Ellen Johnson Sirleaf, began a democratic environment more conducive to building a free and independent press. Sirleaf signed West Africa's first freedom of information law in 2010, granting journalists and the general public the right to access any public document with the exception of records sensitive to national security.

Libel, however, remained a criminal offense and there were cases of government press intolerance between 2005 and 2011 two elections. A spike in attacks against the media in 2009 included police-led assaults and unlawful detentions. The PUL spoke out in a 2010 case against the mayor of Monrovia who ordered the arrest of a Love FM reporter. The 2011 election was rocked by violence in protests by the opposition party Congress for Democratic Change (CDC), leading to the closure of media outlets that were reported to be pro-CDC. The closures were condemned by the Press Union of Liberia, Reporters Without Borders and the Committee to Protect Journalists.

In 2012, Sirleaf signed the Declaration of Table Mountain, a document calling for the repeal of defamation and "insult" laws across Africa. The laws had justified journalist imprisonment and influenced self-censorship.

However, full decriminalization in Liberia has been slow, leading media organizations such as FrontPage Africa to temporarily close in 2013 due to libel damages. The PUL signed a letter authored by CPJ that year to President Sirleaf Johnoson, asking her to follow through with the Table Mountain signing. Earlier the same year, the PUL boycotted coverage of the presidency due to her "glaring silence" after her chief security aide, Othello Daniel Warrick, threatened journalists for articles criticizing the government.

The Ebola virus crisis in 2014 led to the temporary suspension of certain media rights, as the government tried to control reports for the sake of national safety. President Sirleaf Johnson, however, later lauded the PUL for its excellence in helping fight Ebola through information dissemination. She admitted the Union into the Order of the Star of Africa, an award for distinguished service to Liberia in public service of the arts or sciences, in July 2015.
