= TLJ =

TLJ may refer to:

- Star Wars: The Last Jedi, a 2017 film
- The Liberian Journal, a US-based Liberian news site
- Talinga language (ISO 639-3: tlj), spoken in the Uganda–Congo border region
- Tatalina LRRS Airport (IATA code: TLJ), a military airstrip
- The Longest Johns, a British folk music group
- The Longest Journey, an adventure game by Funcom

== See also ==
- TIJ (disambiguation)
