= Cinema of Liberia =

The cinema of Liberia, or Liberian cinema, refers to the filmmaking industry in Liberia. Liberian cinema has played an important part in Liberian culture and in recent years has begun flourishing again after the civil war.

Liberian cinema was impacted by the civil war, when the last cinema was closed in the 1990s. Liberia's capital, Monrovia, had three cinemas, with only one still in existence today. Since the end of the Ebola epidemic, the country's first art-house cinema was scheduled to be opened and operated by Kriterion Monrovia, after the ban on gatherings was lifted.

== Film directors ==
Liberian-related film directors include the following female filmmakers. Nancee Oku Bright based in New York City is known for her 2002 TV documentary Liberia: America's Stepchild. Cheryl Dunye (born 1966) is a Liberian-American film director, producer, screenwriter, editor and actress, best known for The Watermelon Woman (1996), Stranger Inside (2001), The Owls (2010), and Mommy is Coming (2011), which treat themes of race, sexuality, and gender. Siatta Scott Johnson (born 1974) is a Liberian filmmaker and a broadcast journalist, who directed the documentaries The Iron Ladies of Liberia (2007) and Hondros (2017) on war photographer Chris Hondros.

== See also ==
- Media of Liberia
