= Cultural effects of the Western African Ebola virus epidemic =

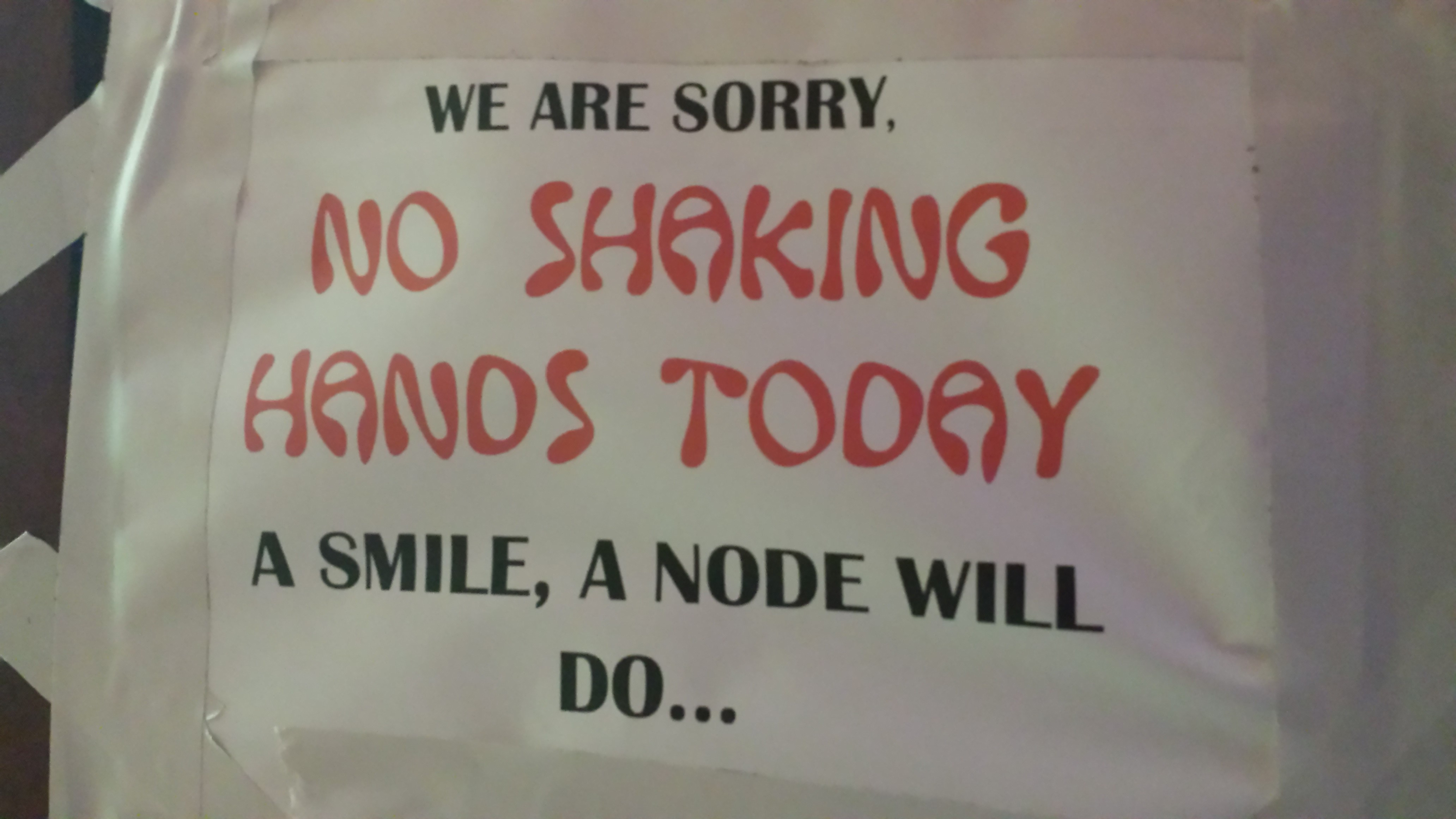
A sign in a Monrovia radio station advising people not to shake hands, as Ebola can be spread through physical contact via body fluids

The Ebola virus epidemic in West Africa has had a large effect on the culture of most of the West African countries. In most instances, the effect is a rather negative one as it has disrupted many Africans’ traditional norms and practices. For instance, many West African communities rely on traditional healers and witch doctors, who use herbal remedies, massage, chant and witchcraft to cure just about any ailment. Therefore, it is difficult for West Africans to adapt to foreign medical practices. Specifically, West African resistance to Western medicine is prominent in the region, which calls for severe distrust of Western and modern medical personnel and practices.(see Ebola conspiracies below.)

Similarly, some African cultures have a traditional solidarity of standing by the sick, which is contrary to the safe care of an Ebola patient. This tradition is known as "standing by the ill" in order to show one's respect and honor to the patient. According to the Wesley Medical Center, these sorts of traditional norms can be dangerous to those not infected with the virus as it increases their chances of coming in contact with their family member's bodily fluids. In Liberia, Ebola has wiped out entire families, leaving perhaps one survivor to recount stories of how they simply could not be hands off while their loved ones were sick in bed, because of their culture of touch, hold, hug and kiss.

Some communities traditionally use folklore and mythical literature, which is often passed on verbally from one generation to the next to explain the interrelationships of all things that exist. However the folklore and songs are not only of traditional or ancient historical origins, but are often about current events that have affected the community. Additionally, folklore and music will often take opposing sides of any story. Thus early in the Ebola epidemic, the song "White Ebola" was released by a diaspora based group and centers on the general distrust of "outsiders" who may be intentionally infecting people.

This initial misinformation increased the general distrust in foreigners, and the idea that Ebola was not in Africa before their arrival led to attacks on many health workers, as well as blockages of aid convoys blocked from checking remote areas. A burial team, which was sent in to collect the bodies of suspected Ebola victims from West Point in Liberia, was blocked by several hundred residents chanting: "No Ebola in West Point." Health ministries and workers started an aggressive Ebola information campaign on all media formats to properly inform the residents and allow aid workers safe access to the high risk areas. In Guinea, riots broke out after medics disinfected a market in Nzerekore. Locals rumored that the medics were actually spreading the disease. In nearby Womey, 8 people distributing information about Ebola were killed by the villagers.

== West African cultural traditions and norms ==
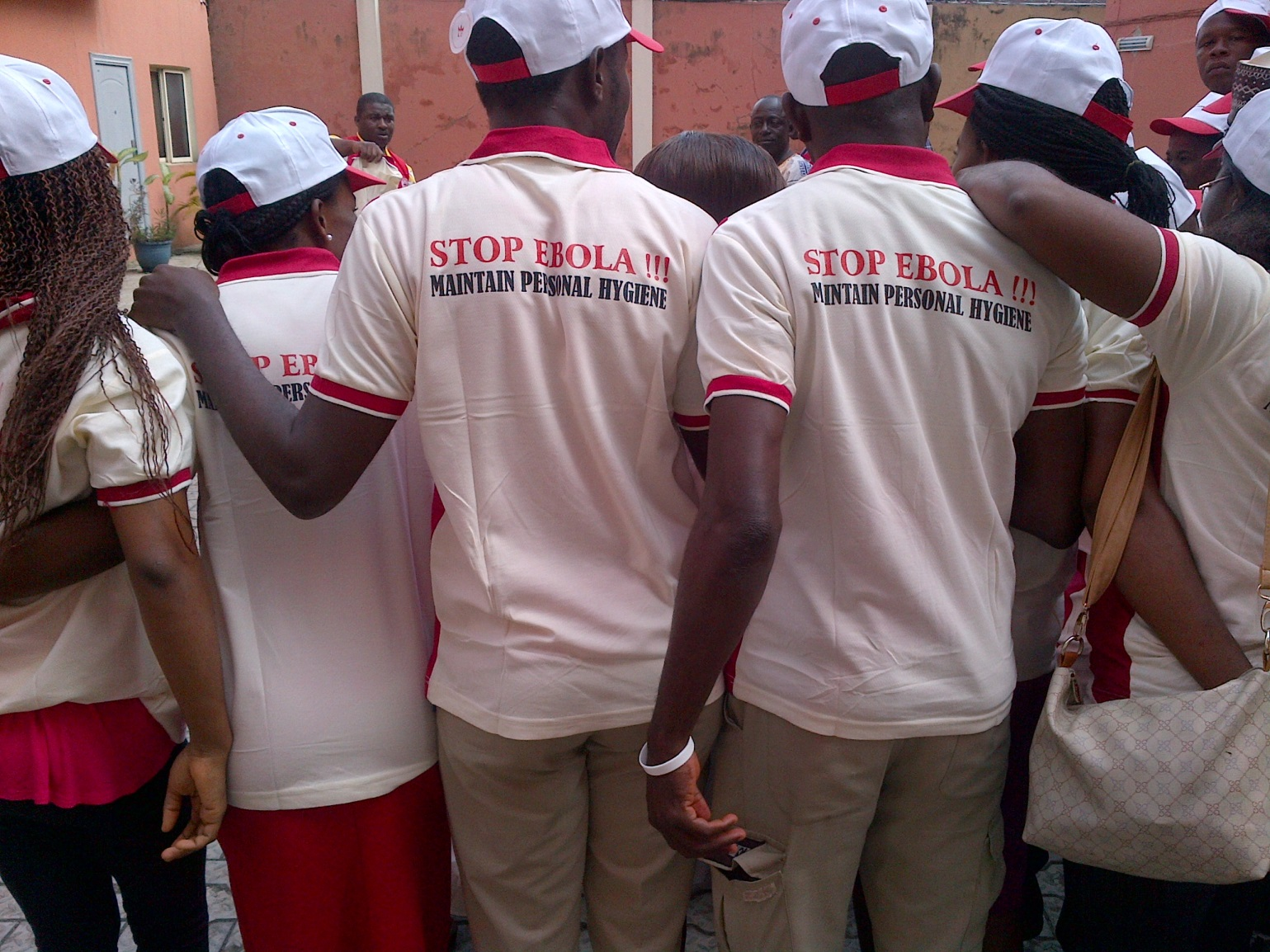
Volunteers distribute health information in Nigeria.

The Ebola epidemic of 2014 has forced West Africans to face numerous difficulties on a daily basis regarding their traditional norms and practices. In essence, their traditions have been severely disrupted due to the Ebola virus. For instance, West Africans have had the tendency to remain close to their sick family members to nurse them during illness for centuries. Unfortunately for West African communities, many have been encouraged to keep their distance from their infected family members as potential contact could be fatal. In addition, it is part of their culture to touch the deceased at funerals and for the sister of the deceased's father to bathe, clean, and dress the corpse in a favorite outfit. When there is not an aunt to perform this task, a female elder in their community is then held responsible. Not only is it customary to wash and touch the deceased, but also to kiss those that have passed.

Specifically, funerals are considered to be major cultural events for families and friends to gather around to celebrate the deceased. The funeral performances, which involve wailing and dancing, is done out of care and respect for the dead. Funerals in West Africa often last for several days, depending on the status of the person who died. In other words, the more important the person who died was while they were alive, the longer the mourning will last. More importantly, there is a common bowl used for ritual hand washing towards the end of the ceremony, including a final kiss or touch on the face, which is to be bestowed on the dead. This is commonly referred to as a "love touch." The Wesley Medical Center has confirmed that prohibiting West African families from performing such rites is a disgrace as it insults the deceased, putting the remaining family in danger. Specifically, it is believed that the dead person's spirit, also known as "tibo," will cause harm and bring illness to the family as a result of an improper burial.

=== Resistance to Western medicine ===
Resistance to Western medicine is considered to be a significant barrier to battling the Ebola virus. The Wesley Medical Center claims that the interference with West African burial rituals caused by Western medical practices has prohibited them from properly honoring their loved ones. They believe that this may have been a reason for heightened distrust in medical professionals, and that the mistrust enhances each time family members of infected persons are prohibited from participating in the funeral or seeing the dead body in person. Due to the mistrust, Ebola-stricken communities in Liberia reportedly hid family members with Ebola from health care providers and held secret burials. In Sierra Leone, health workers made more progress because health measures were implemented according to WHO guidance, which advises health workers to heed the traditions of the threatened communities when attending to the dead. Therefore, funerals were held in agreement with the wishes of the families, but also gave health workers an opportunity to disinfect the bodies. In many of the Ebola infected areas in Africa, Western medicine is also believed either to be ineffective or to be the actual origin of the virus. In other words, there is a belief among the African community that Western doctors are intentionally killing their patients with their treatments. A conspiracy theory also says that the medical professionals are planning to harvest the organs of those dying from Ebola.

Resistance to Western medicine exists also because of the look of the hazmat suits, which are worn by healthcare workers to protect themselves from becoming infected with the Ebola virus. The protective equipment is said to frighten many West Africans and also believed to be hostile and intimidating to the West African families. Lastly, the interference in the family's care for the patient diminishes the honor of the patient as well as hindering the family's duty to provide comfort and care. Regardless of the existing resistance towards Western medicine, handling the bodies of the deceased poses a high risk of contagion as Ebola is contracted through physical contact with an infected person's bodily fluids. This is mainly because preparation for burial includes touching, washing, and kissing as is mentioned above. Those that are preparing for the funeral can become easily infected as they can easily become exposed to the infected person's blood, vomit, diarrhea, and other bodily fluids as these are the main symptoms of the virus.

=== Traditional medical practices ===
Apart from the fact that traditional West African healers have been using ritual and herbal remedies for many centuries, the West African people also trust these treatments and find the costs more affordable. Traditional procedures include the following: magic, biomedical methods, fasting, dieting, herbal therapies, bathing, massage, as well as surgery. Surgical procedures often involve cutting a patient's skin with unsterilized knives. Sometimes, traditional healers apply blood to the skin to rid them of their sickness. Despite the severe distrust of Africans in modern medicine, the Ebola virus has been said to spread rampantly across West Africa due to a shortage of healthcare workers and limited medical resources and facilities. The unsanitary conditions in the overall West African region have also made it easier for Ebola to spread.

== Bushmeat ==
The Ebola virus, for which the primary host is suspected to be fruit bats, has been linked to bushmeat, which is commonly consumed in areas of West Africa that use it as a protein source. Although primates and other species may be intermediates, evidence suggests people primarily get the virus from bats. Hunters usually shoot, net, scavenge or catapult their prey, and butcher the bats without gloves, getting bites or scratches and coming in contact with their blood.

In 2014, the suspected index case for the Ebola outbreak in West Africa is a two-year-old child in Guéckédou in south-eastern Guinea, who was the child of a family that hunted two species of fruit bat, Hypsignathus monstrosus and Epomops franqueti. Some researchers suggested the case was caused by zoonotic transmission through the child playing with an insectivorous bat from a colony of Angolan free-tailed bats near the village.

Despite health organisations warning about risks of bushmeat, surveys pre-dating the 2014 outbreak indicate that people who eat bushmeat are usually unaware of the risks and view it as healthy food. Because of bushmeat's role as a protein source in Western Africa, it is traditionally associated with good nutrition, and efforts to outlaw the sale and consumption of bushmeat have been impossible to enforce and have met with suspicion from rural communities. The UN Food and Agriculture Organization estimates that between 30 and 80 percent of protein intake in rural households in Central Africa comes from wild meat.

One major Nigerian newspaper published a report about the widespread view that eating dog meat was a healthy alternative to bush meat. Dog meat was implicated in a June 2015 Liberian outbreak of Ebola, where three villagers who had tested positive for the disease had shared a meal of dog meat.

== Ebola in print ==
- Crisis in the Hot Zone (1992 article)
  Article written for The New Yorker by Richard Preston. A short chronicle of how Marburg virus and Ebola virus may have entered the United States.
- The Hot Zone (1995 book)
  A non-fiction thriller also by Richard Preston, following a few of the incidents and origins of viral hemorrhagic fevers.
- Ebola: A Documentary Novel of Its First Explosion in Zaire by a Doctor Who Was There (1995 book)
  A self-written chronicle of American surgeon William Close's experiences during the 1976 Ebola outbreak.
- Executive Orders (1996 novel)
  A fictional thriller by Tom Clancy, where a strain of Ebola virus is used as a biological weapon.
- Ebola: Through the Eyes of the People (2002 book)
  A novelization of individuals' experiences and reactions during the 1976 Ebola outbreak by William Close.
- Ebola: Die Entfesselte Seuche (2014 article)
  The September 2014 issue of the German magazine Der Spiegel cover featured Ebola-related graphic, and articles about the epidemic. One of the articles had an interview with Peter Piot, one of the discoverers of the Ebola disease in the 1970s.
- Called for Life: How Loving Our Neighbor Led Us into the Heart of the Ebola Epidemic (2015 book)
  A memoir by an American doctor and his wife about their experiences in Liberia and the United States during the 2013–2016 West African outbreak. Dr. Kent Brantly became the first American to return to the United States to be treated for Ebola virus disease.
- Having and Fighting Ebola — Public Health Lessons from a Clinician Turned Patient (2015 article)
  In February 2015, The New England Journal of Medicine published Dr Craig Spencer's self written account of his fight against Ebola, and the nationwide effects of his infection.

== Ebola in film ==
- Outbreak (1995 film)
  A medical disaster film, loosely based on Richard Preston's book, The Hot Zone, that focuses on a fictional outbreak of an Ebola-like virus in Zaire and the United States.
- Ebola Syndrome (1996 film)
  A fictional film in which the antagonist gets infected by Ebola; however being immune he becomes a living carrier. He then infects many others through his further misdeeds.
- Dasavathaaram (2008 film)
  A science fiction disaster film where a bio weapon using a combination of Marburg and Ebola is created. It is eventually destroyed by a "large quantity of salt".

== Ebola in music ==
- "White Ebola" (2014 song)
  A political song by Mr. Monrovia, AG Da Profit and Daddy Cool, centered on the general mistrust of foreigners.
- "Ebola Is Real" (2014 song)
  A hip hop tune done in collaboration with Liberian hipco artists F.A., Soul Fresh, DenG, Adolphus Scott (a Liberian communication specialist for UNICEF) and Liberia's Ministry of Health & Social.
- "State of Emergency" (2014 song)
  A hip hop tune by Tan Tan B and Quincy B, produced without government involvement.
- "Ebola in Town" (2014 song)
  A dance tune by D-12, Shadow and Kuzzy of 2 Kings, a group of West African rappers, warns people of the dangers of the Ebola virus and explaining how to react, became popular in Guinea and Liberia during the first quarter of 2014. A dance was developed in which no body contact was required, a rare occurrence in African dance. Some health care workers from the IFRC had concerns that the "Ebola In Town" song's warning "don't touch your friend" may worsen the stigma.
- "Ebola est là" "(Ebola Is Here)" (2014 song)
  A parody of Rihanna's "Umbrella" by Senegalese rapper Xuman. The song's lyrics warn locals that, "The disease is among our neighbours, Liberians and Guineans." The track was a hit.
- "Africa Stop Ebola" (2014 song)
  Features contributions from Malians Amadou & Mariam, Salif Keita, Oumou Sangaré, Kandia Kouyaté, Guinean Mory Kanté, Sia Tolno, Ivorian Tiken Jah Fakoly, Congolese Barbara Kanam and Senegalese Didier Awadi. It was recorded to raise awareness of Ebola and offers info on how people can protect themselves from the disease. The song is sung in several local languages, including English, French, Soussou, Bambara, Kissi and Lingala.
- "Africa Must Stand and Fight Together Fight Ebola" (2014 song)
  A George Weah and Ghanaian musician Sidney produced song to raise awareness about Ebola. All proceeds from the track been donated to the Liberian Health Ministry.
- "Ebola Does Not Discriminate" (2014 song)
  A song written and performed by Mohamed S Tyson Conteh ('Special C') with a music video produced by Future View Film Group, Purple Field Productions and WeOwnTV, asking Sierra Leoneans to follow the safe practices and precautions from the health authorities. The song also features a rap from local artist AOK.
- "Lilies" (2014 song)
  Grammy winner Lupe Fiasco released a song that includes Ebola as part of the lyrics, produced by The Buchanans and featuring Sirah.
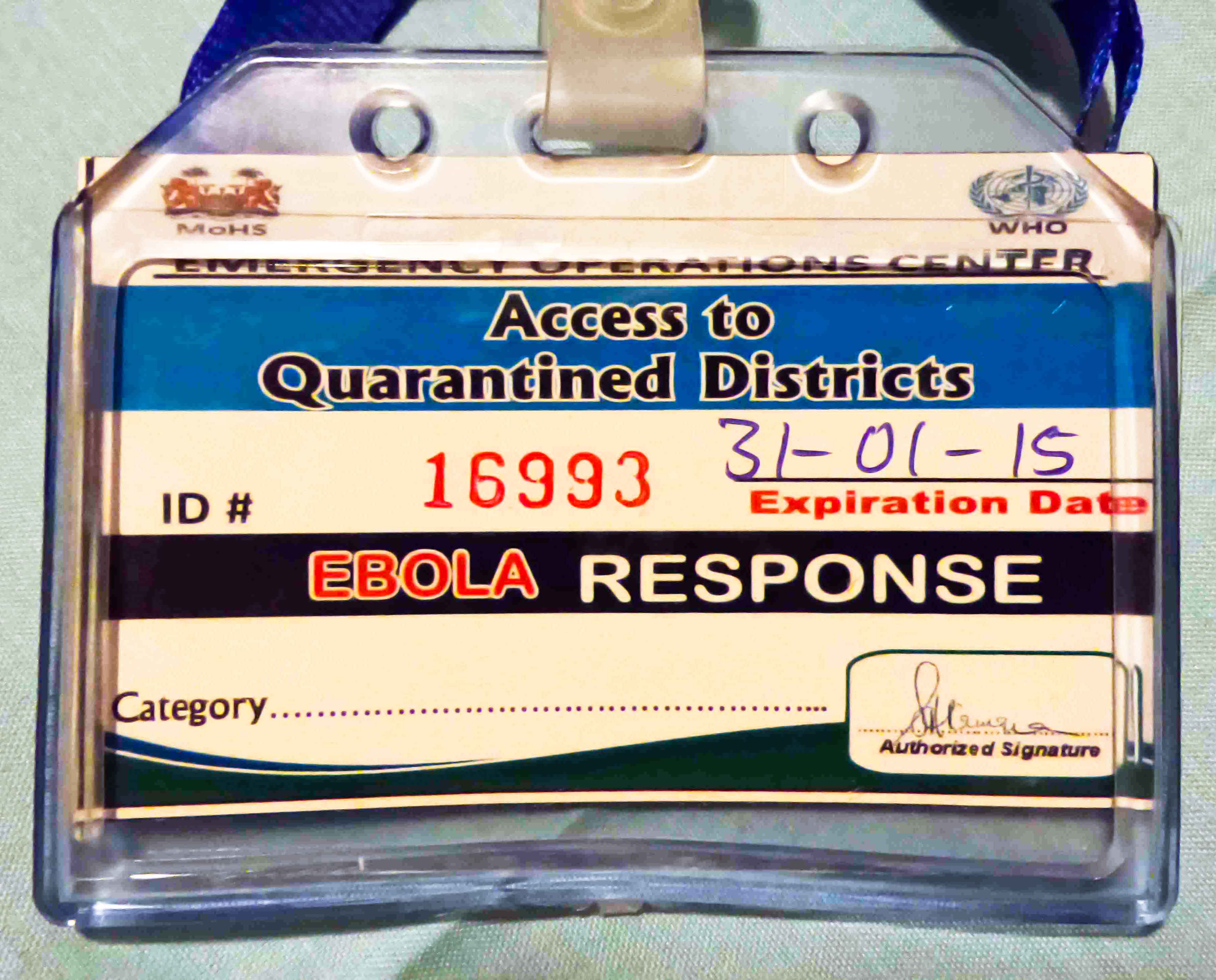
  A quarantine travel pass for people providing help to people who are infected with Ebola
- "Do They Know It's Christmas?" (2014 song)
  At a press conference on 10 November 2014, Bob Geldof and Midge Ure announced the Band Aid 30 project in aid of the Ebola crisis. Artists including One Direction, Bono, Chris Martin, Emeli Sande, Underworld, Sinéad O'Connor, Paloma Faith, Foals and Bastille recorded the adjusted lyrics for the song. On 16 November 2014 the song premiered in Britain's X Factor Sunday night results show, and was formally released on 17 November 2014.
- "Ebola (La La)" (2014 song)
  A controversial parody of Fergie's "L.A. Love (La La)", done by Rucka Rucka Ali.
- "Let Us Live Together Again" (2015 song)
  An anti-stigma track recorded by Lawrence Logan aka Marvellous, Abigail Vinton, Quincy Borrows and Florence Jlopeh in association with the Liberia Red Cross National Society and produced in collaboration with the Musicians Union of Liberia. The initiative, launched on 13 February 2015 aims to promotes tolerance, solidarity and compassion for the reintegration of Ebola survivors back into their communities.

== Ebola in broadcasting ==
- Friends (TV series, 1994–2004; 1995 episode "The One With Five Steaks and an Eggplant")
  To break an awkward silence, Chandler Bing says, "So, the Ebola virus. That's gotta suck, huh?" In 2014, when Ebola reached America, some sources incorrectly said Chandler had predicted the Ebola outbreak, even though the disease had been discovered in 1976.
- A 5-minute public service advert was carefully crafted by Adolphus Scott and others, to increase general Ebola awareness. The clip runs an estimated 5 times a day on Liberian local TV stations.
- Liberian Radio programme directors have increased vernacular Ebola prevention programs' air time on 44 community radio stations to include most of the 30 minority languages used in the rural areas. Programmes of 30 minutes, 3 times a day, include commercials, phone-ins and news, broadcast in the local language. Only about 20% of Liberians understand English.
- A Sierra Leone DJ, Amara Bangura, shares knowledge about Ebola in his weekly show which is transmitted on 35 stations in Sierra Leone. He takes selected questions from the text messages sent in and gets answers from health experts and government officials.
- In October 2014, Sierra Leone launched a school by radio program, that will be transmitted on 41 of the local radio stations as well as on the only local TV station. There will be a variety of subjects on the 6 day a week, 4 hour shows. Education Minister Minkailu Bah raised concerns on the difficulty of reaching many of the school children with a 25% radio ownership and less than 2% TV. However schools are not expected to open until early 2015.
  Screen snapshot of the ISOS and MultiChoice Ebola advert
- A 1-minute animated public service advert was produced by International SOS and MultiChoice. It was created for broadcast on the African satellite service that covers most of Africa. The pay-TV service had 8 million subscribers in Africa at that time.
- #KickEbolOutOfSierraLeone (September 2014 documentaries)
  A group of Sierra Leonean filmmakers, Future View Film Group, put together several educational videos about Ebola. In November Prince William expressed his support in a quick video backed by the Ebola Does Not Discriminate track.
- Surviving Ebola (October 2014 documentary)
  On 8 October 2014, the US PBS debuted a television show which included first-hand interviews with Ebola survivors.
- Today (November 2014 show)
  Six US Ebola survivors were interviewed together on the show.
- Alternative Christmas message (December 2014 show)
  A former Ebola patient who recovered from Ebola after being infected while working as a nurse in West Africa, delivered the UK's Channel 4 Christmas message including info about the spread of the disease.

== Ebola conspiracies ==
- The Liberian Observer, a major Liberian newspaper, has repeatedly published Ebola-related conspiracy theories. In September 2014 it published an article claiming that Ebola and the AIDS virus are genetically modified organisms to be used as bio-weapons on Africans in an attempt to reduce Africa's population. In October the story went viral on social media.
- As the Ebola virus epidemic in West Africa developed in 2014, a number of popular self-published and well-reviewed books containing sensational and misleading information about the disease appeared in electronic and printed formats. The authors of some such books admitted that they lacked medical credentials and were not technically qualified to give medical advice. The World Health Organization and the United Nations stated that such misinformation had contributed to the spread of the disease.
- In Liberia, some body-collection teams dispatched to collect the Ebola dead have collected bribes to issue falsified death certificates to family members, stating that their dead relative did not die from Ebola. The body of the Ebola victim would also be left with relatives. Ebola carries a stigma in Liberia, and some families do not want to admit that their relative died of Ebola. Another factor is that families wish to give their relative a traditional burial.
- In late October 2014, it was reported that harassment of gay Liberians in Monrovia was occurring after some church leaders said that "God was angry with Liberians over corruption and immoral acts such as homosexuality, and that Ebola was a punishment". The harassment included car windows being smashed and some gay people were forced from their homes and had to go into hiding.
- "The Ebola outbreak was sparked by a bewitched aircraft that crashed in a remote part of Sierra Leone, casting a spell over three West African countries – but a heavily alcoholic drink called bitter Kola can cure the virus."
- "Some members of the community thought it was a bad spirit, a devil or poisoning."
- At the beginning of the outbreak, many did not believe that the disease existed. "I thought it was a lie (invented) to collect money because at that moment I hadn't seen people affected in my community."

== General ==
A number of Ebola-themed jokes circulated in West Africa, which were seen as a way to spread awareness of the virus.

In July 2014, the Liberian Football Association made an announcement that all soccer related activities would be put on hold "indefinitely to protect players and fans." In September 2014, in a joint venture between FIFA and WHO, the Antoinette Tubman Stadium was converted into an Ebola treatment center.

The 2015 African Cup of Nations (AFCON) was temporarily put on hold when the original hosts, Morocco, asked the Confederation of African Football (CAF) to postpone the final games till 2016, due to the Ebola outbreak. CAF eventually moved the finals to Equatorial Guinea, which eliminated Morocco from the game as hosts, and brought Equatorial Guinea in, even though they had been eliminated prior.

However the qualifiers for 2015 AFCON have been influenced by many countries' fear of Ebola, with many refusing to enter or allow entry of teams from affected countries. In July 2014, Seychelles refused entry to the Sierra Leone team. CAF ruled that Seychelles forfeited the game, giving Sierra Leone an automatic pass to the next stage. Lesotho refused to send the Under-20 team to Nigeria. CAF again ruled that Lesotho forfeited the game, sending Nigeria through to the finals.

In August 2014, CAF also decided to forbid any official games in Guinea, Liberia and Sierra Leone. For Liberia, who had already been eliminated, this was not of concern. Sierra Leone managed to move some home games to the visiting team's home; both home and away games against DR Congo were played in Lubumbashi, and both games against Cameroon were played in Yaounde. Guinea managed to get their home games moved to Casablanca, Morocco.

Even after calls to have the 2015 AFCON postponed, the Equatorial Guinea government and CAF organisers have downplayed these concerns, and insisted that they would have ample measures in place, including:

- Temperature check for all passengers arriving at the international airports.
- Photograph and fingerprints of international passengers.
- Immunization certificates with detailed medical history.
- Hand sanitizer to be used at all stadium turnstiles.
- 30 specialist doctors on standby.

On 7 August 2014, a social media hoax message was doing the rounds in Nigeria. It urged readers to "bath with hot water and salt before daybreak" and to drink as much of it as possible. On 8 August, the person who started the joke message to see how many of their friends would fall for it, identified it as such and posted an apology. The hoax message quickly went viral when "several gullible, unsophisticated opinion leaders" repeated the hoax message. Within days many were hospitalized due to excessive salt intake, with 2 deaths in Jos, Plateau, 2 deaths in Makurdi, Benue and at least 3 deaths in Bauchi. None of these deaths occurred in states that had known Ebola cases; only Lagos State and Rivers State had any. Eight people died as a result of the hoax cure, equaling the death toll from Ebola in Nigeria.

In two separate incidents in October 2014, flights were delayed from disembarking because passengers falsely claimed to have Ebola. On 8 October 2014, US Airways flight 845 from Philadelphia to Punta Cana, Dominican Republic was held up for two hours on the tarmac when an American passenger sneezed, then announced "I have Ebola. You're all screwed," during the flight. After landing, he was escorted off the plane by four emergency personnel wearing blue hazmat suits, and detained until medical tests cleared him. On 30 October 2014, during the Aer Lingus flight EI 433, from Milan, Italy to Dublin, Ireland a passenger wrote "'Attenzione Ebola'" ("Attention Ebola") on a coffee lid before handing it to his daughter. The container and lid were discreetly disposed of, however a flight attendant noticed, and alerted the captain. The passenger was arrested, and later pleaded guilty to "engaging in threatening, abusive or insulting behavior on an airplane contrary to the Air Navigation and Transport Act", and was fined 2500 euros.

== See also ==
- Ebola-chan
- Ebola virus epidemic in West Africa
