= Liberian Times =

Liberian newspaper

The Liberian Times is a newspaper published in Liberia, based in Monrovia. The Times has a long history; its second incarnation existed between February 1928 and September 1929 and was edited by J. Clement Gibson, Jr. It appears to have closed numerous times and restarted, and has since been established in 2005. It is considered one of the top sources for political issues in Liberia and often the first to publish important political letters.

As of May 2019, their official appears to be offline.

== See also ==
- List of newspapers in Liberia
