= The Inquirer (Liberia) =

Liberian daily newspaper

The Inquirer is a leading independent daily newspaper published in Liberia, based in Monrovia. It is privately owned with a "good reputation". A former notable editor is Gabriel I. H. Williams, secretary general and president of the Press Union of Liberia (PUL).

== See also ==
- List of newspapers in Liberia
