= Mary Larteh =

Traditional leader in Liberia

Mary Larteh is a woman traditional leader in Liberia. She is the Paramount Chief of the Jorquelleh Chiefdom in the Bong County.

== Chieftaincy ==
Larteh was appointed under the Presidency of Ellen Johnson Sirleaf. She heads 14 paramount chiefs in her county.

She was suspended from this position in 2016 over an alleged involvement in the illegal establishment of Sande bushes in her community. According to the executive director of Women Solidarity Incorporated, her action was seen as a means of denying girls of school going age of their right to access education. She was however reinstated the following year by the Ministry of Internal Affairs and is still the chief of the area.
