= Gabriel I. H. Williams =

Liberian journalist

Gabriel I. H. Williams is a Liberian journalist who has worked for The Inquirer. He is the former Secretary General and president of the Press Union of Liberia (PUL), and was a founding member of the Association of Liberian Journalists. In 2002, he published Liberia: The Heart of Darkness : Accounts of Liberia's Civil War and Its Destabilizing Effects in West Africa.
