= TIJ (disambiguation) =

Tij, TIJ, or variations may refer to:

- Tijuana International Airport (General Abelardo L. Rodríguez International Airport), Baja California, Mexico, IATA code
- Tilung language (ISO 639 code: tij)
- Tij, Nepalese women's festival
- Thermal inkjet (TIj), an inkjet technology
- "Tij", a song from the 2007 album Mirrored by U.S. rock band Battles

== See also ==
- TLJ (disambiguation)
- Tijs, a Dutch given name
