= Elisabeth Luce Moore =

American philanthropist

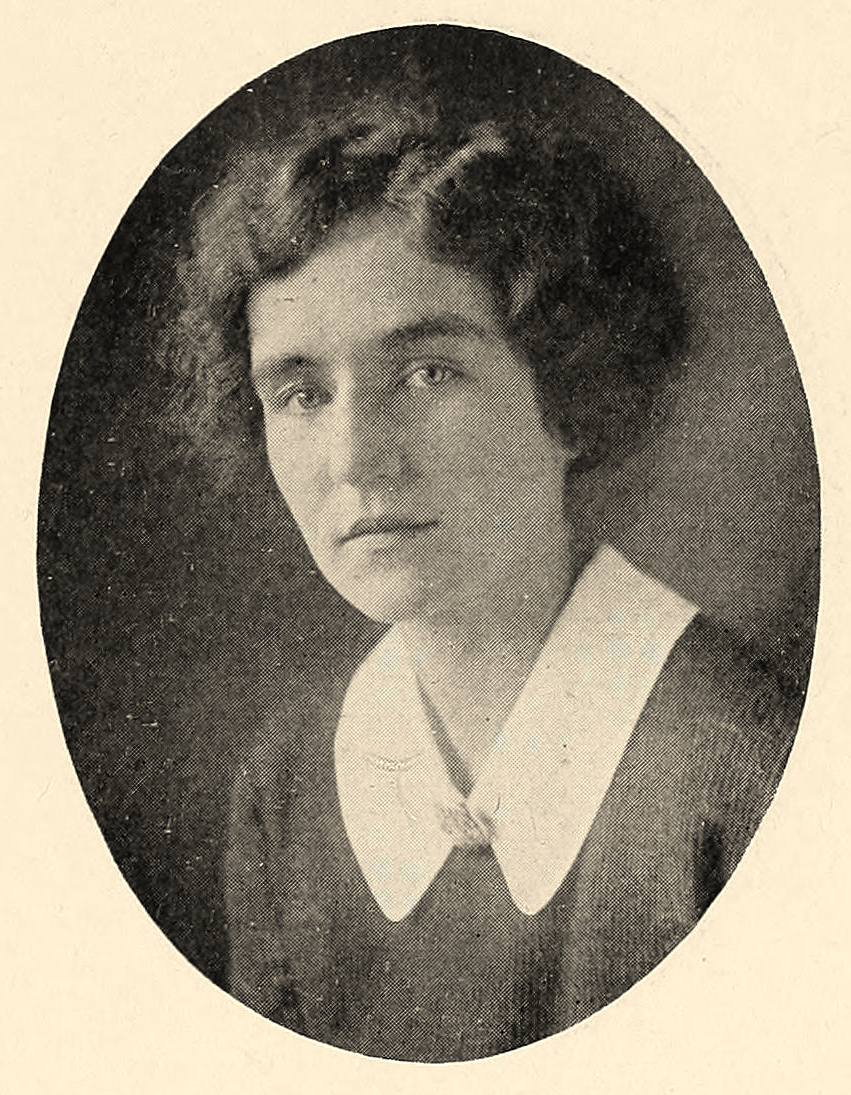
- Elisabeth M. Luce, from the 1924 Wellesley College yearbook
- Born: April 4, 1903; Teng Chou, China
- Died: February 9, 2002 (aged 98); New York City
- Education: Wellesley College
- Occupations: Writer, editor, clubwoman, philanthropist
- Relatives: Henry R. Luce (brother)

Elisabeth Luce Moore (April 4, 1903 – February 9, 2002) was an American philanthropist, educator, and volunteer.

== Early life and education ==
Elisabeth Middleton Luce was born on April 4, 1903, in Teng Chou, China to Presbyterian Board missionaries who were there to establish a Christian college. She is the sister of Henry R. Luce, founder of Time magazine.

She graduated from Wellesley College in 1924, where she majored in the Department of Biblical History and Literature (now the Department of Religion).

== Career ==
Early in her career, Moore worked as editor and writer for her brother's periodicals. Moore wrote magazine articles and book reviews for much of her life.

She was also active in volunteer social work, working with such agencies as the New York Junior League and the National and International YWCA, serving as chair of the YWCA's foreign division in 1944. She was chair of the Nation Council of the USO during World War II, and she served on the advisory committee of the Economic Cooperation Administration, which administered the Marshall Plan. She was a delegate to the International Conference of Women in 1951. Luce Moore served as board chair of the Institute of International Education, which administers such exchange programs as the Fulbright Scholar Program. She has also served as vice-president of United Services to China, and as trustee of the China Institute of America, the Asia Foundation, and the United Board for Christian Higher Education.

In 1968 she was appointed by Governor Nelson Rockefeller as chair of the Board of Trustees of the State University of New York, the first woman to hold that job. Moore served on the Board of Trustees at Wellesley College from 1948 until 1966.

Moore served for 63 years on the board of the Henry Luce Foundation, which finances projects in Asian affairs; she retired from her position in 1999.

== Personal life ==
Moore married Maurice T. Moore in 1926; they had two sons, Thompson and Michael. Moore died at her home in Manhattan on February 9, 2002.

== Legacy ==
=== Elisabeth Luce Moore Library ===
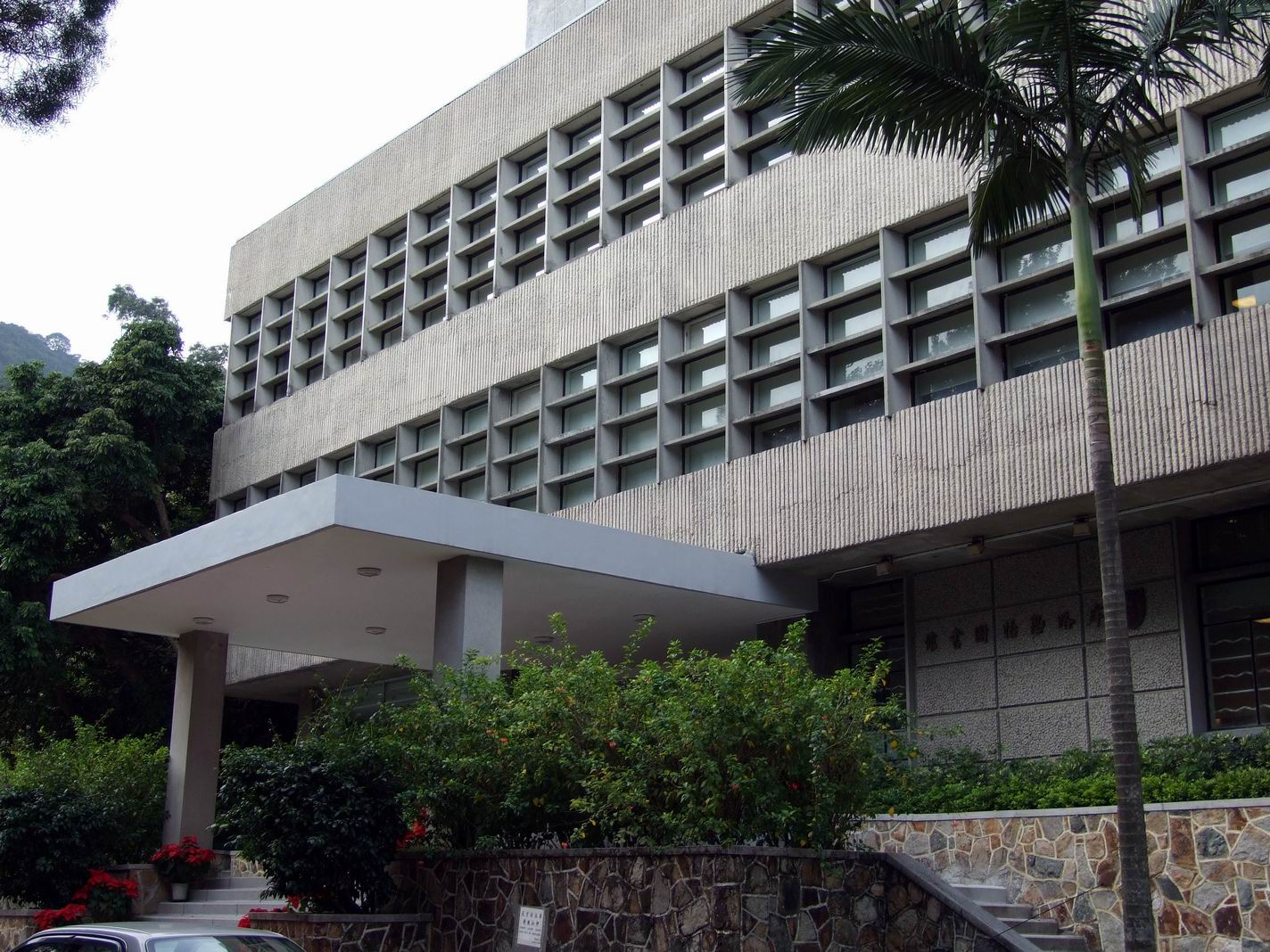
The Elisabeth Luce Moore Library at Chung Chi College in Hong Kong

The Elisabeth Luce Moore Library at Chung Chi College in Hong Kong was named for her. Dedicated on October 29, 1971, it was built with funds from the Henry Luce Foundation.

=== Elisabeth Luce Moore Leadership Program for Chinese Women ===
This namesake program was created by the Institute of International Education to train Chinese women in community-based non-profit organizations.

=== Elisabeth Luce Moore '24 Professorship in Christian Studies ===
Moore established this position at her alma mater Wellesley.

=== Elisabeth Luce Moore Preserve ===
Moore owned this 75-acre estate in Weston, Connecticut, open to the public for hiking.

=== Elisabeth Luce Moore '24 Fund for the Study of World Religions ===
Moore established this fund, which maintains fellowship grants for Wellesley students, in 1988.

== Honors ==
Moore holds honorary degrees from Columbia University, Duke University, Princeton University, Trinity University, the State University of New York, Claremont Graduate Center, Wellesley College, Hamilton College, Adelphi College, Western College, and Silliman University in the Philippines.

She has also received numerous awards for her work, among them the Elisabeth Blackwell Medal from Hobart and William Smith Colleges, the National Institute of Social Sciences Medal, the Reader's Digest Award, and the Order of the Brilliant Star from the People's Republic of China.
