= Liberia National Television =

Liberia National Television is Liberia's state-owned television channel, owned by the Liberia Broadcasting System. It operates a sister station, Metro TV.

== History ==
In 1963, Liberia lacked television infrastructure, but planned to implement it in 1963, with a transmitter being installed in its capital Monrovia with assistance from Rediffusion subsidiary Overseas Rediffusion, which already owned the national radio network. The new service had educational and commercial goals and would soon cover the whole country. Its broadcasts began in January 1964 from channel 6 in Monrovia, by the mid-1970s, it had installed television taping facilities. The nightly schedule ran from 7pm to 10:45pm on Sundays, Mondays, Wednesdays and Fridays; on Tuesdays, Thursdays and Saturdays, the opening time of ELTV was anticipated to 6:45pm. By 1984, ELTV was airing US TV series, often two years behind the original airing.

ELTV was, for decades, the only television station in Liberia. As of 1993, it only broadcast from 6pm to midnight.

LNTV was struck by lightning on 13 June 2016, causing it to be off-air for an unspecified period of time. In 2018, it signed an agreement with the Liberia Movie Union to screen Liberian movies on the channel.

By September 2024, LNTV had successfully converted to digital terrestrial television and was broadcasting twelve hours a day.
