= Dva Super Dana =

Rock Festival held in Sarajevo, Bosnia and Herzegovina

- Genre: Indie music, Alternative music
- Dates: 15–16 April
- Locations: Sarajevo, Bosnia and Herzegovina
- Years active: 2016 – 2019
- Organiser: Kriterion Sarajevo
- Website: www.kriterion.ba

Dva Super Dana (English: Two Super Days) was an annual two-day indie and alternative rock music festival held in Sarajevo, Bosnia and Herzegovina from 2016 to 2019. The festival was established in 2014 by the Kriterion Foundation as a platform for the promotion of unsigned indie and alternative rock bands from the Former Yugoslavia. It is held in April in the Kriterion Art Cinema.

== History ==
#	Year	Location	Dates	Headliners	Guests	Notes
1	2016	Kriterion Art Cinema	15–16 April	Artan Lili, Kawasaki 3P, Werefox, Stereo Banana, Billy Andol, Postolar Tripper		The pilot edition of the festival was organized in the Kriterion Art Cinema in downtown Sarajevo.
2	2017	Kriterion Art Cinema	15–16 April	Seine, Letarg, Postolar Tripper, Hulahoop, Billy Andol, S.K.A.		

== See also ==
- Kriterion Monrovia
