= Kriterion Monrovia =

Student-run cinema organization in Liberia

Kriterion Monrovia is a student-run nonprofit organization focused on promoting cinema in Liberia. The group operates the only arthouse cinema in Liberia. Since its founding in 2011, it has screened over 40 films including locally produced art films.

== Background ==
After suffering from two civil wars where much historical and cultural knowledge were lost, Liberia struggled to develop a vibrant film culture. After 14 years of conflict, in 2003 the country began the slow process of rebuilding and recovering. Amid this process though, the Ebola virus epidemic violently erupted within the region and severely hit Liberia. The war-torn country totalled around 4,300 deaths due to the outbreak. During this time, members of the Liberian film community stopped movie screenings and went door-to-door to help raise awareness for the virus.

== History ==
Inspired by the models of Kriterion Amsterdam and Kriterion Sarajevo, Kriterion Monrovia was started by Pandora Hodge while she was a student at University of Liberia in 2011. Together with other students, she went to different communities in Liberia using a projector to screen about 40 different movies for the general public. The group was awarded their first seed money from BSC-Spark with later support from Monrovia Breweries, the Accountability Lab, and the Liberian Ministry of Health, among others.

In 2018, Kriterion Monrovia hosted the second Europe Liberian film festival. At the conclusion of the event's two-weeks of activities, which included several film screenings, the Charge D'affaires of the European Union, Emma Sundblad, announced the construction of Liberia's first arthouse cinema to be run by the student group. A year prior, Kriterion Monrovia had launched a crowdfunding initiative in order to fund the project.
