= Sky FM =

Radio station in Monrovia, Liberia

Sky FM is an independent radio station based in Monrovia, Liberia, broadcasting on FM 107. Its director is T.max Jlateh, who also hosts a morning talk and news program, 50-50.

In 2012, after FrontPage Africa reporter Mae Azango was threatened with violence for her reporting on female genital mutilation by the secret Sande society, Sky FM's Tetee Gebro broadcast a version of Azango's story in a show of solidarity.
