= Liberia Telecommunications Corporation =

Liberian telecommunications company

- Company type: Government-owned corporation
- Industry: Telecommunications
- Founded: 1973
- Headquarters: Monrovia, Liberia
- Area served: Liberia
- Key people: Cllr. Alexandra Kormah Zoe Chairman of the Board of Directors Hon. J. Richardson Ndorbor Chief Executive Officer/Managing Director Hon. Wolobah Gbozee Chief Operating Officer
- Products: Fixed wireless telephone Wireless Internet; Fax services Push-to-talk radio
- Website: libtelco.com.lr

The Liberia Telecommunications Corporation (LTC) is a telecommunications company providing services in Liberia. Headquartered in Monrovia, the company provides telephone, Internet, fax and radio services to the Greater Monrovia area. Prior to the passage of the Telecommunications Act of 2007, LTC possessed a legal monopoly over the country's fixed line services, and today remains the sole company licensed by the Liberia Telecommunications Authority to provide fixed line telephone services. Currently, the LTC Act was amended in 2020 to ensure that LTC provide full scale mobile network operations within the Republic of Liberia.

== History ==
LTC was founded through the Liberian Telecommunications Corporation Act of 1973 to construct and operate the country's fixed line communications infrastructure and to provide services to residents and businesses. Originally, the corporation was also given exclusive policy setting and regulatory authority over all telecommunications in the country, though these powers were transferred to the newly created Ministry of Posts and Telecommunications in 1978.

The corporation ceased operations in 1990 following the outbreak of the First Liberian Civil War and the subsequent collapse of the national government. The civil war resulted in much of the corporation's infrastructure being destroyed. Following the end of the Second Liberian Civil War in 2003, the transitional government failed in its attempt to privatize Libtelco. In 2006, the newly elected President of Liberia, Ellen Johnson Sirleaf, reactivated Libtelco, appointing a temporary Board of Directors while also ordering the creation of a new telecommunications policy for Liberia.

The subsequent Liberia Telecommunications Act of 2007 placed regulatory authority over Libtelco and the Liberian telecommunications industry with the newly created Liberia Telecommunications Authority, while also granting Libtelco the sole license for all fixed line telephone services in the country until 2011. Sirleaf appointed a new board and management team to operate the company in 2007. The government has also stated its intention to privatize the company at some point in the future.

== Services ==
The civil war resulted in the complete destruction of Liberia's landline infrastructure. As a result, Libtelco has focused on expanding telephone, Internet and fax services through fixed wireless systems. Beginning in 2009, the company began offering services through a new CDMA-2000 1x-EvDO network. Libtelco owns a 20% interest in the Cable Consortium of Liberia, which owns and operates the cable landing point of the ACE cable system in Monrovia, which was completed in 2012. The company is currently using its existing ownership over cable ducts in the Monrovia area to construct a fiber-optic communications network that will connect to the cable system.

Libtelco currently owns more thirty sites and twenty seven more towers communications towers around the country, which it both utilizes in its network and leases to Liberia's other GSM mobile service providers.
