= Chung Chi College Elisabeth Luce Moore Library =

University library in Hong Kong

- 崇基學院牟路思怡圖書館
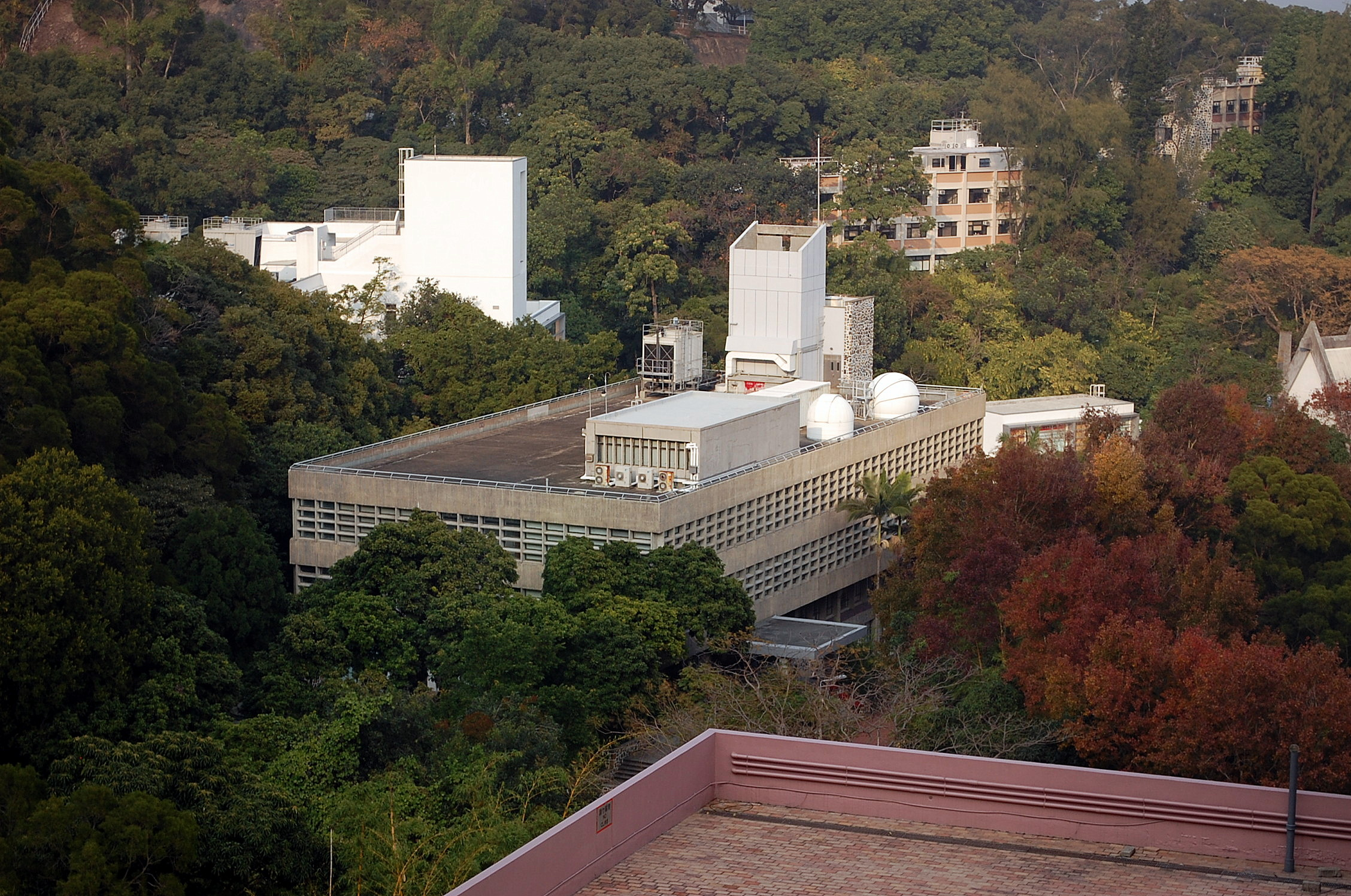
- A view of the library from above.
- 22.41652°N 114.20868°E
- Established: 1951

Other information
- Parent organisation: Chinese University of Hong Kong
- Website: lib.cuhk.edu.hk/ccl

Chung Chi College Elisabeth Luce Moore Library
- Traditional Chinese: 崇基學院牟路思怡圖書館
- Simplified Chinese: 崇基学院牟路思怡图书馆
Transcriptions
Standard Mandarin
- Hanyu Pinyin: Chóngjī Xué Yuàn Móu Lù Sīyí Túshūguǎn
Yue: Cantonese
- Yale Romanization: Sùhng gēi hohk yún màuh louh sī yìh tòuh syū gún
- Jyutping: Sung4 gei1 hok6 jyun2 mau4 lou6 si1 ji4 tou4 syu1 gun2

Chung Chi College Elisabeth Luce Moore Library (noted as CCL) is the library of the Chung Chi College of the Chinese University of Hong Kong.

It was donated by the Henry Luce Foundation and was named after Mrs. Elisabeth Luce Moore. Resources found in the Elisabeth Luce Moore Library range from recognized music and religion collections to specialized works. Facilities include Late Reading Rooms and Group Study Rooms.

== Background ==
Of the seven libraries in The Chinese University of Hong Kong (CUHK), the Chung Chi Library was first built in 1951 with its home at St. John's Cathedral Library. In 1956, it moved to the Ma Liu Shui campus. With a donation through the Henry Luce Foundation in the United States of America, the present library was named after Elisabeth Luce Moore and moved the last time to the Chung Chi College campus in 1971.

== Resources ==
Collections in the Elisabeth Luce Moore Library are especially specialized out of all university libraries found in CUHK. Other than recognized music and religion collections, there are also collections of Western literature and languages, Japanese literature and language, philology and linguistics, education and sports science. All collected works are supported by the Departments of Music, Religion, English, Modern Languages and Intercultural Studies, Japanese Studies and Faculty of Education in the Chinese University of Hong Kong.

In addition, the Library provides resources like theses, newspaper, together with ERIC documents and out-of-print materials on Music and Religion. To be specialized in education, Instructional Materials Collections, which is the collection of teaching materials for all secondary and primary schools' subjects of Hong Kong, can also be found in the Elisabeth Luce Moore Library.

Moreover, electronic resources can be accessed by CUHK students and staff too. These resources include the materials of Education, Humanities, Language & Literature, Music, Religion and Sport Sciences.
