= Cable Consortium of Liberia =

Liberian Cable Consortium

- Formation: 2010
- Type: Public–private partnership
- Headquarters: Monrovia
- Location: Liberia
- Interim Chairman: B. Anthony McCritty, Sr. (Ministry of Finance)
- Key people: Angelique Weeks (Regulator); Nathaniel Kevin (Lonestar); Ben Wolo (Libtelco); Ciata Victor (Libtelco); William Saamoi (Cellcom)
- Website: cclnetwork.weebly.com (archived)

The Cable Consortium of Liberia (CCL) is a public-private partnership formed in 2010 to own and operate Liberia's cable landing point for the ACE cable system. Stakeholders in the project include the Government of Liberia (60%), Libtelco (20%), Lonestar Cell (10%), and Cellcom (10%).

CCL signed the Construction and Maintenance Agreement for the ACE system on 5 June 2010. The CCL's share of the US$700 million project is $25 million. The World Bank provided an initial US$5 million grant to finance half of the Government of Liberia's stake in the project. The cable will be the first fiber optic telecommunications cable to land in Liberia, which had not previously collaborated in other African cable projects due to its 14-year civil strife.

The cable landed in Monrovia on 3 November 2011, with the terminal station expected to be completed by December 2011. However, the cable will not become operational until the entire ACE system is completed, projected for Q2 2012. Once completed, maintenance of the .lr top-level domain for Liberia, currently maintained in the United States, is expected to be relocated to Liberia.
