= Nancee Oku Bright =

Liberian documentarian

- Citizenship: New York City
- Education: Oxford University
- Occupations: Liberian; documentary filmmaker; director; producer
- Notable work: Mothers of Steel (book), America's Stepchild (documentary)

Nancee Oku Bright is a Liberian documentary filmmaker, director and producer based in New York City, United States. She is Chief of the humanitarian division of the UN peacekeeping mission in the Democratic Republic of the Congo.

== Life ==
Nancee Oku Bright gained an MA degree and a doctorate in social anthropology from Oxford University. Her PhD, on Eritrean refugees in the Um Gargur refugee camp in Sudan, was published as a book in 1998.

Bright has worked as a journalist, writing for the BBC, several British newspapers, Vogue, Newsday and the Miami Herald. She has made short ethnographic documentaries on refugees in Sudan and life in Liberia. Her PBS documentary Liberia: America's Stepchild (2002) examined the causes of the First Liberian Civil War.

During the height of the DRC's civil war, she was Humanitarian Chief of the peacekeeping mission, where her work involved negotiating for humanitarian access with rebel groups and government authorities, expanding humanitarian presence, and spearheading the establishment of a civilian-led emergency hospital in the country’s troubled northeast.

== Works ==
=== Books ===
- Mothers of Steel: The Women of Um Gargur, an Eritrean Refugee Settlement in the Sudan, Red Sea Press, 1998

=== Films ===
- Liberia: America's Stepchild, 2002
