= STAR radio =

STAR
Monrovia; Liberia
- Frequency: 104 MHz

Programming
- Format: News

Ownership
- Owner: Foundation Hirondelle

History
- First air date: 1997

Links
- Website: starradio.org.lr

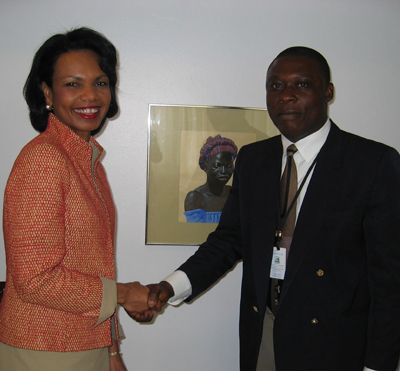
STAR reporter Wellington Geevon Smith with U.S. Secretary of State Condoleezza Rice

STAR radio is an FM radio station in the West African nation of Liberia. Founded in 1997, it is independent of the country's government. Headquartered in Monrovia, it broadcasts at the 104 FM frequency and via shortwave radio.

== History ==
The radio station began broadcasting on FM in July 1997 supported by the Foundation Hirondelle. In September 1997, STAR began broadcasting in short wave frequencies. In January 1998, the Charles Taylor led government removed the station from the airwaves for a week. As of 1999, the station was funded by the United States government, the International Foundation for Election Systems, and the Dutch government. At that time STAR produced eight hours of content each day.

In 1998, reporter Vinicius Hodges won first prize for radio in CNN's African Journalist of the Year Competition. On March 15, 2000, the Taylor government again shutdown the station, citing inflammatory comments. The ban was lifted on November 3, 2003, after the Taylor regime was deposed, and STAR resumed broadcasting on May 25, 2005.

In June 2007, the station moved to the Snapper Hill area in Monrovia. STAR was named the radio station of the year in Liberia in May 2008 by the Press Union of Liberia, and awarded prizes including a tape player. The organization also named one employee as best newscaster and another as best court reporter. In September 2008, the station received praise for their coverage of the Truth and Reconciliation Commission from the Liberia Media Center.

== Details ==
STAR broadcasts at 104 FM in the capital of Monrovia for 17 hours each day. There is also a shortwave radio broadcast each day for one hour at 7:00 a. m. on the frequency 9525 throughout Liberia. Broadcasts are provided in 21 different languages and are rebroadcast on the internet. The station's studio is on Broad Street in the Snapper Hill section of Monrovia.
