= Mae Azango =

Liberian journalist for FrontPage Africa

- Occupation: Journalist
- Known for: Reporting on female genital mutilation
- Awards: CPJ International Press Freedom Award (2012); CJFE International Press Freedom Award (2012)

Mae Azango is a Liberian journalist for FrontPage Africa. She is particularly known for her reports on female genital mutilation (FGM), which helped suspend the practice in the nation. In 2012, she was awarded the International Press Freedom Award of the Committee to Protect Journalists.

== Early life ==
Azango is the daughter of Robert G. W. Azango, an Associate Justice of the Supreme Court of Liberia. In 1990, during the First Liberian Civil War, he was dragged from the family home during breakfast and beaten by members of Charles Taylor's National Patriotic Front of Liberia, later dying in jail from his injuries.

Mae Azango gave birth to her first child during the war, at the age of 18. Forced to use a traditional midwife, Azango stated that the superstitious midwife beat her during the birth and accused her of being an adulteress. Azango later became a refugee.

== Journalism ==
Azango returned to Liberia in 2002 and began work as a journalist. Topics of her reporting included abortion, illegal mining, rape, teen pregnancy, and work conditions on projects funded in Liberia by Libyan ruler Muammar Gaddafi. In 2011, she documented the rape of a 13-year-old girl by a police officer, causing him to later be arrested.

== Reporting on female genital mutilation ==
Azango is best known for her reporting on FGM, a traditional practice in which the clitoris and part of the labia are amputated, often in unsanitary conditions, by members of the secret Sande society. An estimated 58% of Liberian women went through some form of the procedure. Azango wrote her first story on the topic in 2010. Explaining her choice to write on the "taboo" topic, she stated, "A lot of people don't have a voice. If I don't write about it, how will people know about it?"

On 8 March 2012—International Women's Day—she published a story in Front Page Africa telling of a woman who was held down by five other women while her clitoris was amputated. The story detailed the procedure, which the Sande consider secret. The paper received so many threats the day that the story appeared that Azango's editor, Wade Williams, called to tell her to go into hiding. The threats included that Azango herself would be "caught and cut". After local police failed to take action against the threats, Azango went into hiding, sending her nine-year-old daughter to stay with relatives.

The Committee to Protect Journalists (CPJ), a US-based press NGO, called on Liberian president Ellen Johnson Sirleaf to issue Azango protection and guarantee her safety. Amnesty International and Reporters Without Borders also issued statements of support, as did the Columbia Journalism School and the International Federation of Journalists. Radio journalist Tetee Gebro of the Liberian station Sky FM broadcast a version of Azango's story in a show of solidarity.

Before the end of the month, in part due to domestic and international pressure sparked by the incident, Sirleaf's government announced that it had agreed with traditional leaders that the practice of FGM would be officially suspended. The statement was the first time Liberian politicians had publicly criticized the practice of FGM.

== Awards ==
In 2011, Azango won a grant from the US-based Pulitzer Center on Crisis Reporting for her work on "under-reported stories" in "human interest and developmental journalism".

Following the FGM controversy, Azango was announced as a winner of the 2012 CPJ International Press Freedom Awards. The award recognizes journalists who show courage in defending press freedom despite facing attacks, threats, or imprisonment.

Also in 2012, Azango won one of Canadian Journalists for Free Expression's International Press Freedom Award. The awards are presented annually to journalists who have demonstrated their commitment to human rights and honest reporting, and who have overcome tremendous obstacles in their work. The award is presented at the CJFE Gala: A Night to Honour Courageous Reporting, held in Toronto, Canada.
