= Liberia Broadcasting System =

State-owned radio and TV network in Liberia

Liberia Broadcasting System (LBS)
- Type: Broadcast radio network and television network
- Country: Liberia
- Availability: Nationwide
- Owner: Government of Liberia
- Launch date: 1 January 1960 (radio); 1 January 1964 (television)
- Former names: Liberia Broadcasting Corporation
- Picture format: Unknown (probably NTSC or PAL)
- Callsign meaning: Liberia Broadcasting System
- Former callsigns: ELBS; LBC
- Official website: elbcnews.com elbcnews.net

The Liberia Broadcasting System (LBS) is a state-owned radio and television network in Liberia. Founded as a corporation in 1960, the network was owned and operated by Rediffusion until 1968, when management passed to the Government of Liberia. The network began broadcasting television as the Liberia Broadcasting Corporation in January 1964 over channel 6. Following the 1980 coup d’état, the newly formed People's Redemption Council gave the network its current name. As a result of the First Liberian Civil War, the company briefly ceased broadcasting in 1990, because the network's premises were heavily damaged by war and looters over the next seven years.

The station later continued to broadcast all through the war after its home in Paynesville, outside Monrovia became inaccessible from Monrovia. Upon the arrival of the West African peace keeping mission, ECOMOG, to Liberia in 1990, The Force provided a space for LBS to continue its broadcast at the Monrovia Free Zone, on the Bushroad Island, where the Peace Keepers were based. The station later moved to the Ducor Continental Hotel on upper broad street in central Monrovia where LBS operated until 1998 (following the election and inauguration of Charles Taylor as president of Liberia) when it moved back to Paynesville.

The network continue to provide radio broadcasts, though the lack of proper equipment limited the broadcasts to a sixty-mile radius around Monrovia. In 2008, the Chinese government installed a new 10 kW FM transmitter, along with several secondary transmitters throughout the country, which extended the network nationwide. Additionally, the network re-established its television service, the Liberia National Television for the Monrovia area with plans to extend it nationwide.

== See also ==
- Communications in Liberia
