= .lr =

Internet country code top-level domain for Liberia

- Introduced: 9 April 1997
- TLD type: Country code top-level domain
- Status: Active
- Registry: PSGnet
- Sponsor: RGnet, LLC
- Intended use: Entities connected with Liberia
- Actual use: Gets some use in Liberia, including official government sites
- Registration restrictions: Registration is limited to those with a local presence and intent to use the domain
- Structure: Registrations will be made at the third level beneath second-level names
- DNSSEC: Yes
- Registry website: Domain registration

.lr is the Internet country code top-level domain (ccTLD) for Liberia. The registration is limited to those with a local presence and intent to use the domain.

Registration under the domain requires specific second-level domains (COM.LR, ORG.LR, NET.LR, etc.).

== Second level domains ==
- com.lr: Commercial
- edu.lr: Schools granting baccalaureate degrees
- gov.lr: Governmental entities
- org.lr: Not-for-profit organizations
- net.lr: Network infrastructure (i.e.routers) only
