= Sande society =

West African women's secret society

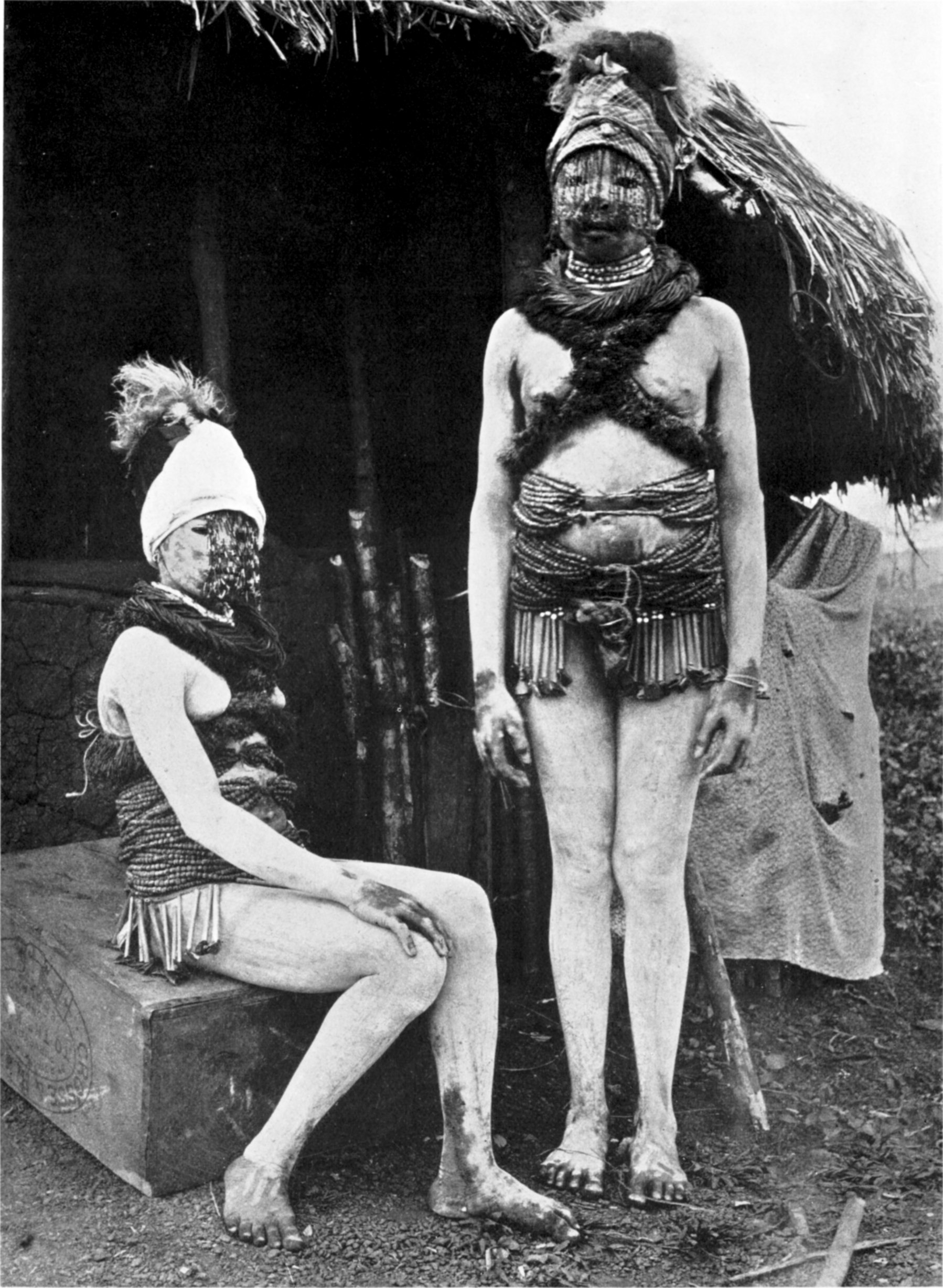
Sande society initiates marked with white clay and animal fat, called Hojo or Wojeh.

Sande, also known as zadεgi, bundu, bundo and bondo, is a women's initiation society in Liberia, Sierra Leone, Guinea and the Ivory Coast. The Sande society initiates girls into adulthood by rituals including female genital mutilation. It is said by its supporters to confer fertility, to instill notions of morality and proper sexual comportment, and to maintain an interest in the well-being of its members throughout their lives.

In addition, Sande champions women's social and political interests and promotes their solidarity vis-a-vis the Poro, a complementary institution for men.

== Geographic extent ==
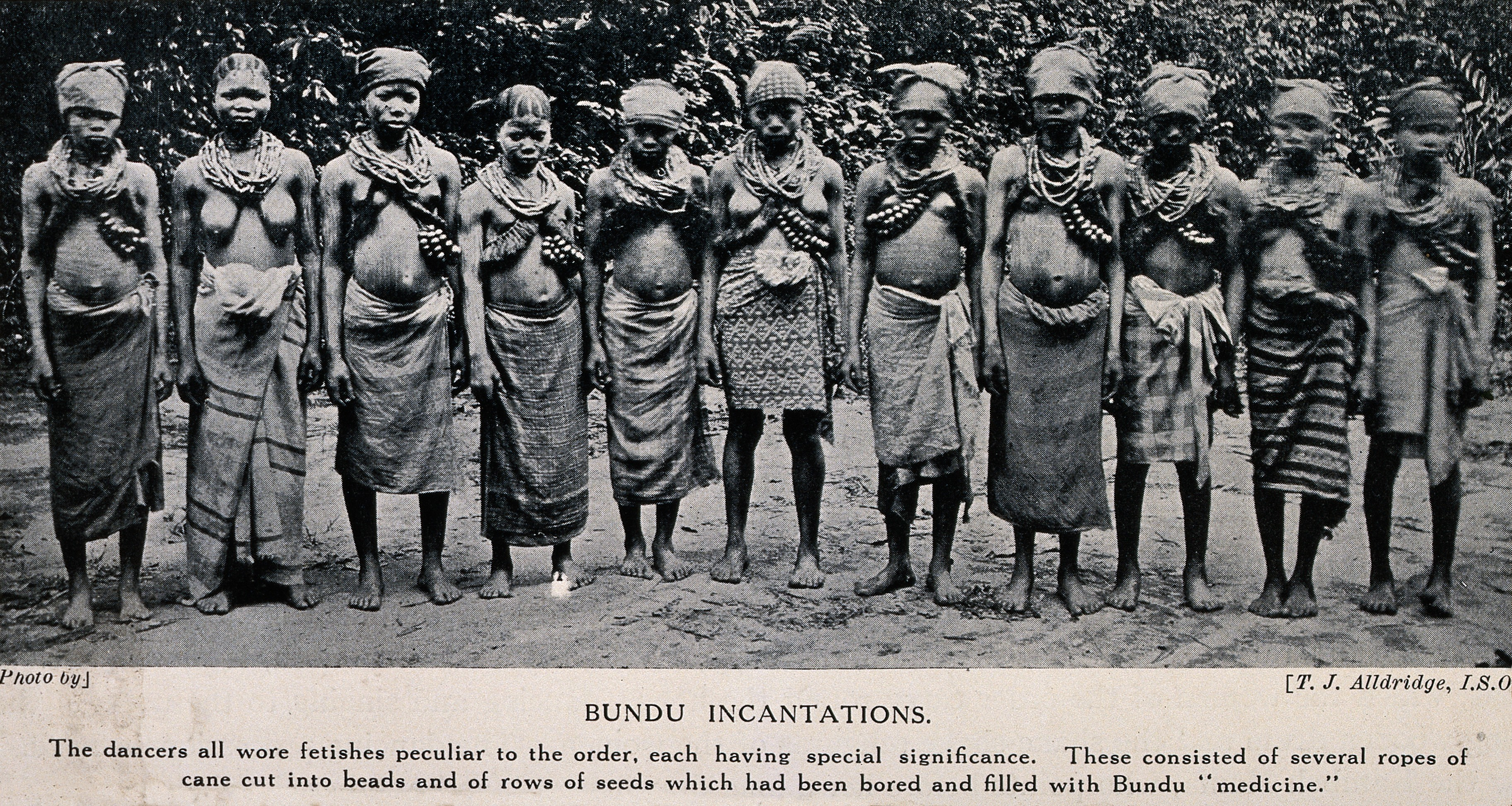
Teenage girls being initiated into the Sande society, Sierra Leone. "The dancers all wore fetishes peculiar to the order, each having special significance. These consisted of several ropes of cane cut into beads and of rows of seeds which had been bored and filled with Bundu (Sande) medicine".

The Sande society is found throughout the Central West Atlantic Region, an ethnically plural and linguistically diverse region that lies within the forested littoral zone bounded by the Little Scarcies River and Cape Palmas. As early as 1668, a Dutch geographer named Olfert Dapper published a description of the "Sandy" society as it existed in the Cape Mount region of Liberia, based on a first-hand account that seems to date from 1628.

Anthropologists believe that Sande originated in Gola society and spread to the neighboring Mende and Vai; other ethnic groups adopted Sande as recently as the present century. Today this social institution is found among the Bassa, Gola, Kissi, Kpelle, Loma, Mano and Vai of Liberia; the Kono, Limba, Mende, Sherbro, Temne and Yalunka of Sierra Leone; and in the northern and eastern extension of these ethnic groups in Guinea.

The predominantly Christian Sierra Leone Creole people are the only ethnicity in Sierra Leone not known to practice FGM or participate in bondo/sande society rituals.

== Common features ==
The common features of all of these women's associations are:

- Group initiation in a secluded area of the forest.
- The use of Sande society names in lieu of birth names following initiation.
- Scarification.
- Body modification in the form of piercings and skin removal.
- Hierarchically ranked female leadership.
- A pledge of secrecy vis-a-vis men and uninitiated girls.
- Female genital mutilation performed by female specialists.

An additional characteristic Sande feature – the wooden helmet mask and raffia palm costume worn by Sande leaders – is absent among the Kono, Loma, and Mano.

== Regional variations ==
Although anthropologists and art historians sometimes describe the Sande society as an all-embracing, pan-ethnic association, there is considerable cultural variation throughout the region. The ethnic groups where the Sande Society is present speak languages belonging to three language families (Mande, Mel and Kru). They may be animists, or like the Mende, Vai and Yalunka, they may have significant Muslim populations.

In some societies, such as the Bassa, Kissi and Kono, the complementary men's society, the Poro, may not be present. Among the Dei and Loma, the Sande society regularly admits male blacksmiths as ritual specialists, and in Gola society, the spirit represented by the mask is considered to be male rather than female. Indeed, the quintessential symbol of Sande among many of the ethnic groups where this woman's association is present – the wooden helmet mask – is entirely absent among the Kpelle, Kono, Loma and Mano.

== Initiation and transformation ==
=== Sequestration and female genital mutilation (FGM) ===
Adolescent girls are initiated as a group during the post-harvest dry season in a specially cleared area of forest surrounding the town or village. The initiation period varies from several weeks to several months, depending upon such factors as the initiate's age, lineage membership, school attendance, and ethnicity.

In the past, the girls are said to have remained in the forest, called the bondo or bush period, for upwards of one year, during which time they made rice farms for the Sande leadership. Nowadays, the initiation period lasts around 3–4 weeks. In addition to the initiate's labor, Sande leaders receive a substantial initiation fee from the girl's father or her prospective husband, as a girl may not marry before initiation.

The details of what transpires in the bush are kept secret, but it is known that the clitoris and part of the labia are excised. It is a highly respected female elder who usually performs this surgery. She is reputed “to have a good hand” and good social influence to welcome girls to the bush.

Sande membership and initiation practices are promoted by zoes, who are typically elderly women who lead the Sande bush. The primary purpose of the female genital mutilation (FGM) procedure is to remove the sexual desire and promiscuity of women, thereby making them “clean” and suitable for marriage. On the day to perform FGM, girls are first asked to ‘numb the area’ by sitting in a bucket of water. Then, they are each tied down with their hands and legs separated. The zoe will perform the ‘procedure’ without any anesthesia. In the past, zoes have used ‘ritual knives’, now it is more common to use unsterilized razor blades or surgical blades.

=== Post-initiation education ===
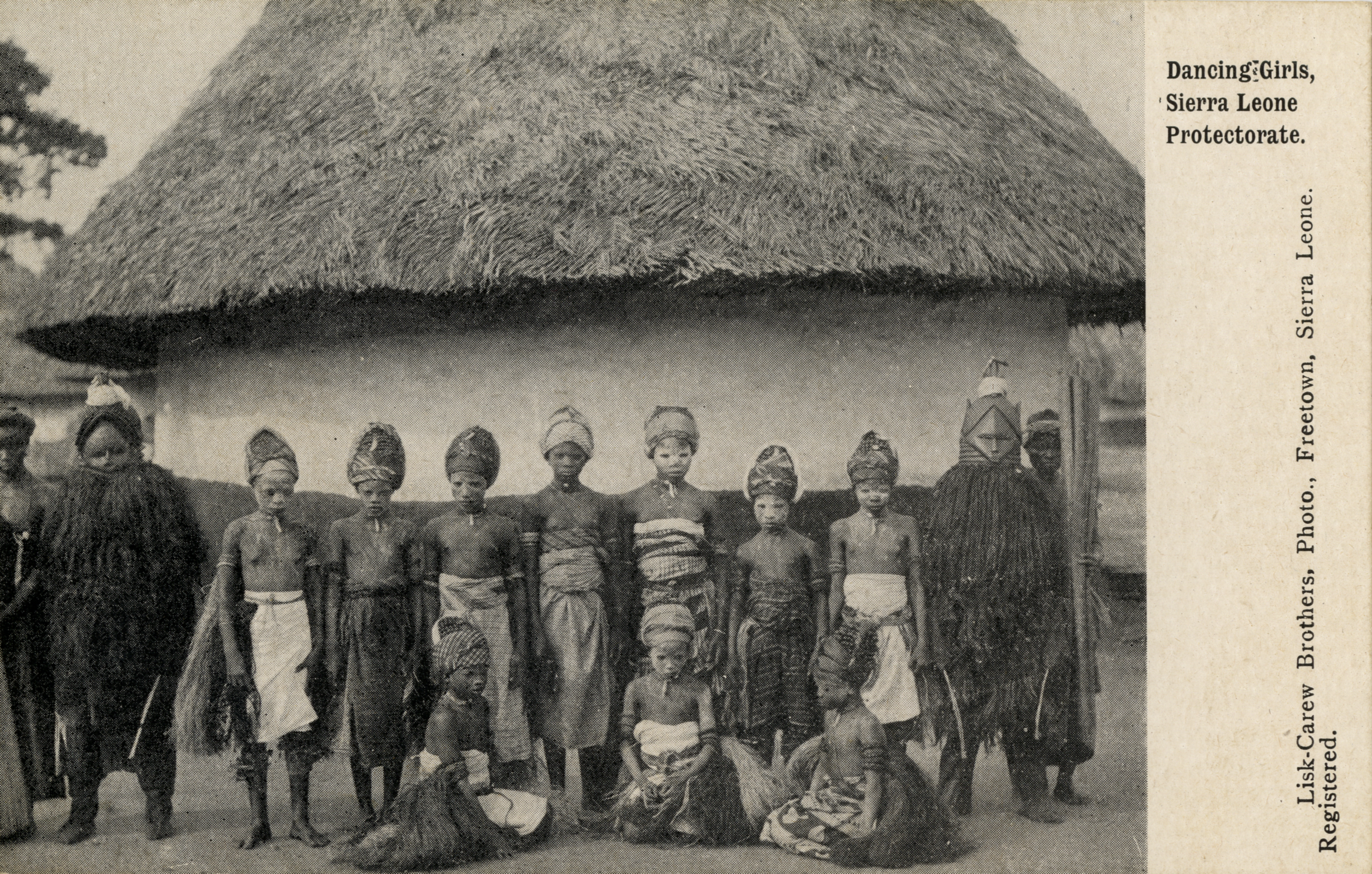
Sande society initiates, Sierra Leone. To either side of the initiates stand masked women wearing "devil masks", who are in charge of the initiation.

After their wounds have healed, the girls are instructed in domestic skills, farming, sexual matters, dancing, and medicine. Specialized skills such as dyeing cloth may be taught to girls who demonstrate special aptitude or, according to some sources, to girls from high-ranking landowning lineages. Although there is some debate about whether the emphasis of bush school is to offer girls novel skills that they might not otherwise have at this stage in their lives, it is vital for cultural integration. It is through Sande school education that girls learn cultural customs, such as what it means to be a good wife and mother, as well as how to treat elders. As Carol MacCormack suggests, it is through the bush school where “they begin to anticipate the role of wife who must work cooperatively with her co-wives and her husband's female kin."

The most essential lessons learned are deference to authority and an absolute respect for secrecy. The ‘secret’ is enforced by an ‘oath’, and they are told the price for revealing what happened in the ‘bush’ is death to either them or a member of their family. The fear instilled by the zoes make FGM a prohibited conversation topic to discuss with non-members, and open conversation around it could be interpreted as questioning the legitimacy of Sande and its moral teachings.

=== Bonding ===
The shared experience of a lengthy stay in the forest and the risk of the surgery binds the girls together as a cohesive social group. During the bush school period, each girl's family is obliged to send large quantities of food and there is song and dance each night. The songs usually end with instructive mural laws linked to Sande society. After initiation, members obtain the feeling of a larger cultural identity. The induction into Sande society is quite separate from a woman's social status or position, and is an identity and community she can draw on at any point in her life.

Membership in Sande is a lifelong identity that members carry down to their daughters. Through this bonding, women are also taught to maintain the peace of the town. If a man abuses or insults a Sande woman, no other woman in Sande will talk to him. Due to the immediate social ostracization that occurs when men step out of line, women hold the power to create accountability mechanisms in the villages based on the strong bonds that occur during initiation.

=== Return to the community ===
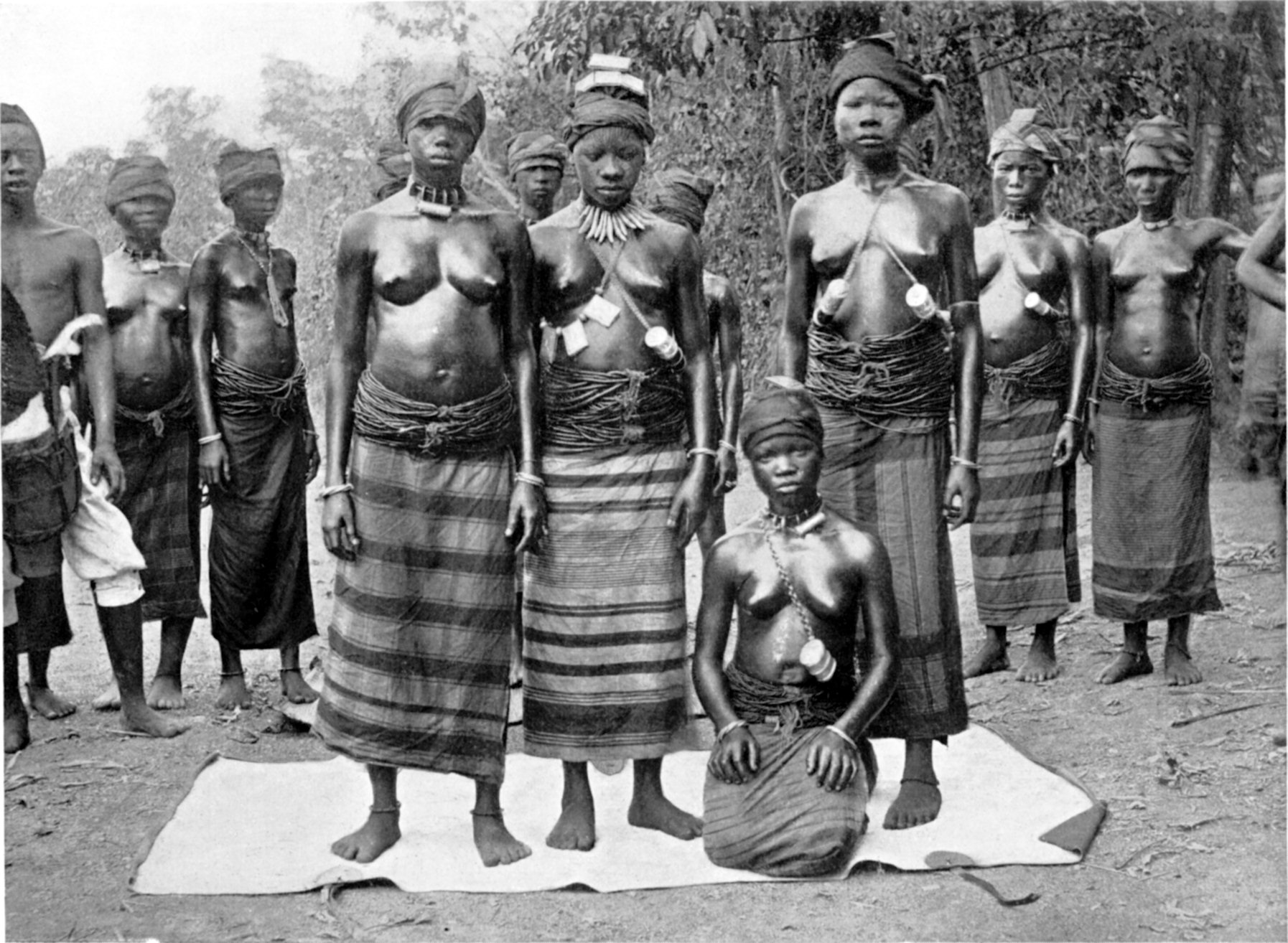
Sande society initiates, Sierra Leone.

At the conclusion of their initiation the girls are ritually washed and returned to the community as marriageable adults. They emerge from the forest dressed in their finest clothes, with new names signifying their newly achieved adult status and their persona (i.e. rank) in the association's ritual hierarchy. In some areas, cicatrization in the form of teeth support the view (held by the uninitiated) that the girls were devoured by a forest spirit that has now returned them to society; although death and rebirth imagery is not a universal feature of Sande initiation.

The ceremony that follows initiation is comparable to a graduation ceremony. The initiates are all dressed in white cotton dresses and head veils, and they sing and dance for everyone in the community to watch. After, each proud initiate stands with her family and friends, donning an outfit signifying she will never need to be initiated again. The next day, the girls model self-control by sitting still while others celebrate their achievement. The men express their interest in the initiated girls as future brides and celebrate their virtues of virginity and faithfulness.

Within Sande society, these new initiates hold the lowest status, but will gain status as they grow older. Hierarchy within Sande is based on both secrecy and age, and older members tend to have more secret knowledge than younger members. As these girls further immerse themselves into society and gain valuable skills, such as midwifing and medicinal work, they are made more valuable in the community.

=== Symbolic meaning ===
According to Jedrej (1986), the Sande initiation ritual centers on several sets of spatial and temporal oppositions, such as those between village (public) and forest (secret) space, on the one hand, and ancestral time (sacred) and the present-day (profane) on the other. The initiate's moral transformation from child to adult occurs in three stages (novice > virgin > bride) marked by public scarification, skin removal, and/or body piercings in the town or village. A key symbol of these performances is the initiate's metaphorical movement through water, the realm of the ancestors.

== Unique masking traditions in Liberia ==
Women generally do not wear masks in West Africa, but in this region the most numerous and most important wood masks are produced for use by women for the Sande. Several types of masks, some in wood but many made of leather, fur, and cloth, are used in conjunction with the counterpart male initiation society, the Poro. The masks used in these societies have common iconographic features throughout the region, but each mask is known by an individual person name corresponding to the spiritual force believed to be associated with the local Poro or Sande society chapters.

=== Iconography of the Mende/Vai helmet mask ===
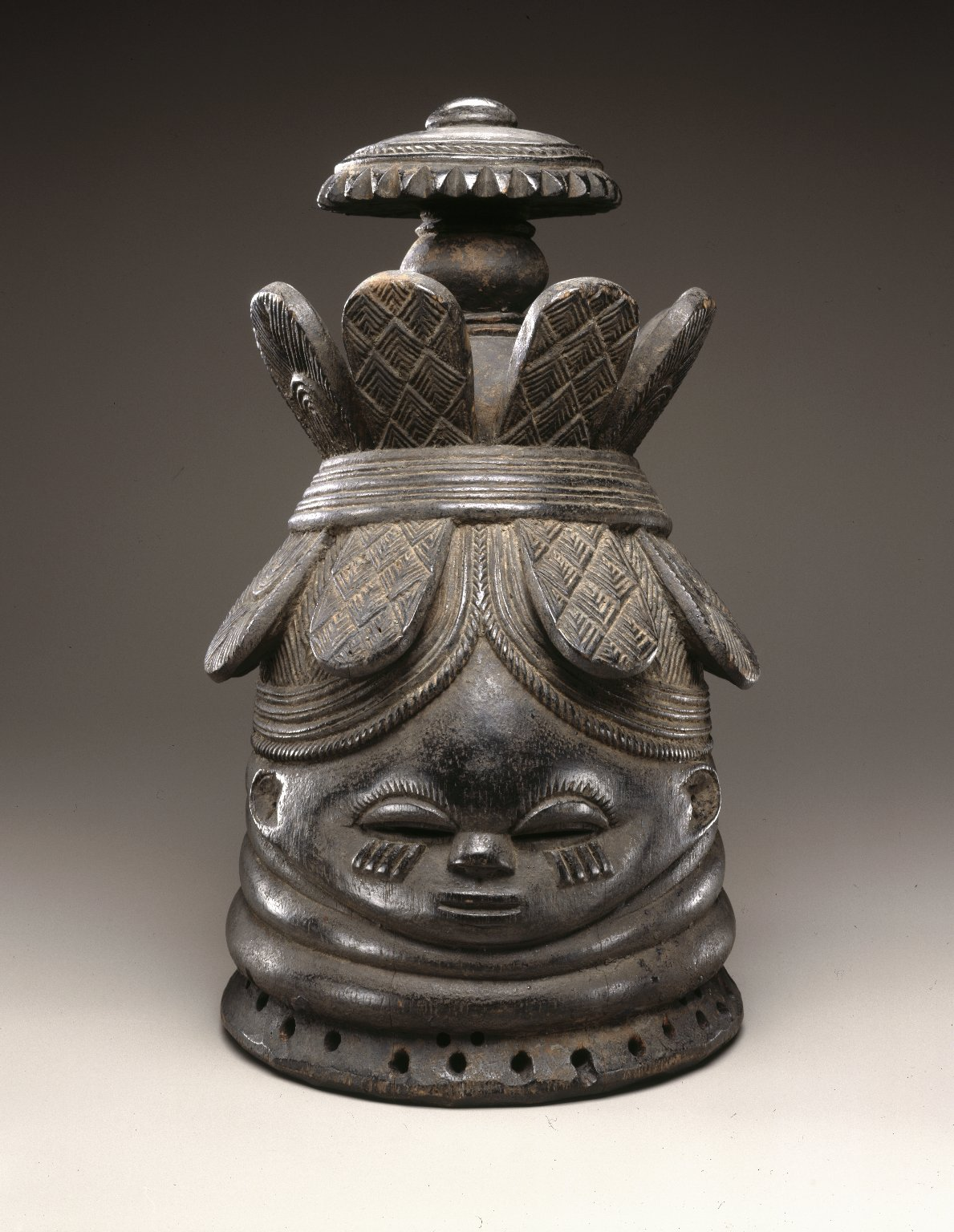
Helmet mask (ndoli jowei) for Sande society; late 19th-early 20th century; wood; 39.4 x 23.5 x 26 cm (15 1/2 x 9 1/4 x 10 1/4 in.); Brooklyn Museum (New York City). A vertical crack runs from base of mask to head band at back center and includes a triangular 1 3/4 hole below band

This type of mask, also often called bundu, is worn at initiation ceremonies celebrating a successful transition into womanhood. In Mende society, "the term sowo refers to both the supernatural entity which represents the women's secret society, and the masked dancer whose polished black anthropomorphic helmet mask and black raphia-covered body the spirit invests with its presence and power."

In addition to the mask's appearance at girls' initiation ceremonies, sowo also "appears in public to mark important civic events such as the visits of important dignitaries and the coronations and funerals of important chiefs. On these occasions, her presence is a means of impressing on the community the unity and strength of the female corporate body as well as Sande's political significance."

According to Dubinskas, the Mende say a finely carved sowo mask is nyande ("good," "pretty," "beautiful" and aesthetically "pleasing") when it includes the following elements, each of which has a symbolic meaning:

- Full forehead: wisdom, intelligence
- Somnolent, downcast eyes: modesty
- Shining black color: mystery
- Neck rings: health and prosperity (as well as the mask's mythic rise out of the water)
- Birds: messengers between spirits and humans
- Cowries: wealth
- White cloth: ritual purity
- Fish, snakes, tortoises: the riverine home of sowo
- Antelope horns and lasimo (scripture): 'good medicine' (hale nyande)
- Three-legged cooking pot: represents sowo as a repository of women's knowledge, and as a symbol of domesticity

In addition, the mask's eyes should be slightly oversized (indicating knowledge and wisdom), while the mask's nose and mouth should be slightly smaller than human-sized (for a discussion of Mende feminine beauty).

Dubinskas writes that the mask represents the ideals of womanhood and the ideal image of feminine beauty, an everywoman versus a woman of extraordinary power, desired by all but attained by an elite few. As such, the mask "embodies and mediates contradictions between traditional feminine role models in the society and the actual political and economic power which women do have access to, if not consistently, then at least regularly and generally enough for that power to call forth a significant symbolic focus in the ideological realm."

== Relationship between Sande and Poro societies ==
Throughout this region, the complementarity of men's and women's gender roles – evident in such diverse activities as farming, cloth production, and musical performances – reach full expression. The women's Sande and men's Poro associations alternate political and ritual control of "the land" (a concept embracing the natural and supernatural worlds) for periods of three and four years respectively. During Sande's sovereignty, all signs of the men's society are banished.

At the end of this three-year period, the Sande leadership "turns over the land" to its counterparts in the Poro Society for another four years, and after a rest period the ritual cycle begins anew. The alternating three- and four-year initiation cycles for women and men respectively are one example of the widespread use of the numbers three and four to signify the gender of people, places and events; together the numbers equal seven, a sacred number throughout the region.

Due to the interconnected nature of the Sande and Poro societies, women are regarded as valued and essential community leaders. Although men and women are not regarded as being complete “equals,” Sande society holds a large sway over the community and zoes play an integral role in community conflict resolution. During Sande leadership of the land, men brush the sides of the Sande bush and build the hut that will host the bush school, in addition to making sure that the initiates’ safety and security is maintained at all times. The men care a great deal about ensuring that Sande society has everything taken care of when leadership turns over because they are promised to marry the girls in the Sande bush. In this way, Sande and Poro societies work together to ensure that secretive rituals continue. While women appear to lead FGM practices, men also play important political roles to maintain its respect in the community.

Both the Poro and Sande societies have sacred and secret forest areas surrounding the village where they conduct their initiation ceremonies. Trespassers are severely punished if they enter, and there is an eight to ten feet fence marking their entrance.

== Political and economic sway of Sande society in Liberia ==
Sande society plays a large political, social, educational, and economic role in Liberia. The practices of Sande, including its initiation rituals, have been documented since the 17th century. National data continued import of Sande societies in Liberia, as FGM is still practiced by 13 of the 16 tribes, by both Muslim and Christian communities, and by well over half of the women in the North-Central and North-Western regions. As a result of Sande society's heavy influence over many rural communities in Liberia, being initiated into the society is necessary to attain influence and power on a local level. Families who choose to opt out of the Sande or Poro societies in areas where it's practiced are treated as social outcasts and moral sinners, and are not able to take part in any village decision-making.

=== Economic influence of zoes ===
Being a zoe has always come with great respect and economic reward. During the slave trade, for example, zoes used ‘bush’ schools as a way of obtaining women to sell to Europeans, and kept the profits for themselves. Zoes continue to reap large economic benefits from their leadership role in Sande society. The ‘bush’ schools charge fees and zoes have decreased their length in order to increase turnover. It's not uncommon for parents to choose between sending their children to bush school or village schools due to the associated costs. Once deciding to send their children to bush school, if parents fail to pay the zoes’ fees, their children may not be permitted to return. Because zoes control the labor and services to girls in the village, they also extract fees for their spiritual support or assistance during pregnancy and childbirth.

=== Sande's influence over local and national politics ===
Politically, Sande and Poro societies have been protected by official government regulations since 1924. Politicians vying for power have sought initiation into the Poro society to gain legitimacy. It is the job of the government's Ministry of Internal Affairs to regulate the societies nationwide, as well as to protect them from local contestation. After the Liberian Civil War ended in 2003, the government placed a renewed central focus on supporting cultural traditions, such as Sande and Poro societies, and courting their leaders during election campaigns. Since zoes hold considerable local power and influence, politicians frequently use them to win rural support. Sande and Poro leaders head the National Council of Chiefs and Elders (NCCE), the representative body of traditional authorities in Liberia, and play an advisory role to internal affairs throughout the country, as well as to the state government itself. The Minister of Internal Affairs, Dr. Henrique Tokpah, like many Liberian politicians, promised to continue to work with all traditional chiefs and zoes in Liberia and to protect their customs.

=== Sande and FGM-related matters ===
At the heart of the debate surrounding these traditions is the issue of female genital mutilation (FGM). Momo Kiazolu, chairman of the country's tribal chiefs, emphasized that "it's important for Liberia that [FGM] should continue because that's our culture. Maybe people say it's harmful and don't know what they're talking about." As a result of Sande society's integral role in local national level politics, legislation that has tried to limit FGM practices in Liberia has been largely ineffective. In 2012, for example, the government of Liberia announced that it had suspended licenses for Sande leaders, but FGM continued at the same rate despite this measure. Additionally, in 2016 when a domestic violence bill was proposed with a clause banning FGM, zoes used their sway in rural communities to ensure that it was taken off the bill, mobilizing their members to protest the ruling and its associated politicians. In 2018, former President Ellen Johnson Sirleaf signed Executive Order 92, temporarily banning FGM for the span of a single year. However, this bill was severely limited in its scope and only covered girls below the age of 18 and held lenient penalties for perpetrators. Resultantly, it did little to reduce FGM practices throughout the country. Due to the political influence zoes hold on nearly two-thirds of the Liberian population, no law actually threatening the power of Sande can be approved at a national level.

Despite the strong political and social sway of Sande, some data suggests that the prevalence of FGM and Sande society practices is declining. According to a 2019-20 Demographic and Health Survey conducted by the U.S. State Department, 38 percent of girls and women ages 15 to 49 have undergone FGM in Liberia. This a clear fall in prevalence from 72.4% among 45–49-year-old women and 39.8% among 20–24-year-old women. However, this cannot be directly attributed to Sande societies losing any of their cultural influence and membership, and might be more suggestive of underreporting due to increased anti-FGM messaging in the media and by the government. The practice remains widespread among women who live in rural areas (52.3%), particularly when compared to those in urban areas (29.9%). It is most prevalent in the North Western (68.3%) and North Central (54.2%) regions. No definitive statistics about the number of women involved in Sande or its temporality exist due to the secretive nature of the society and the widely held fears of retribution for speaking out about its practices, such as FGM. As a result, these numbers are likely to be underreported.

== Criticisms of Sande society ==
Although Sande society is integral to the cultural fabric of Liberia, it has also faced wide scrutiny. The main criticisms are its negative effects of girls' enrollment in local schools, its practicing of FGM, its lack of an age limit for initiation, and its recurrent cases of coerced initiation of non-members.

In 2011, a Ministry of Gender and Development/UNFPA study found that being involved in Sande increased girls' likelihood of dropping out of school. Parents have reported prioritizing Sande initiation fees over school fees. Additionally, when bush school is held during the school year, many girls have to pull out of classes for several weeks and frequently do not return.

Humanitarian and feminist activists have problematized Sande's FGM practices and the dangers that it poses to women's health and freedom. Concern has been raised over the age of consent for initiation into Sande societies. Girls as young as two have been sent into bush school. Public health advocates have also raised alarm over the after-care practices for the FGM procedure. Due to the remote and discreet nature of the bush, it is unlikely that zoes will take girls to a nearby clinic if complications arise. Additionally, the unsterilized instruments also pose a risk for local infection, sepsis, and even death.

Lastly, there are recurrent cases of forced Sande initiation of non-members that routinely go unpunished. Sande society has a rule that anyone that steps onto their land has to abide by their rules. As a result, strangers who are unaware of traditional customs are forcibly kidnapped and initiated. In each of these cases, FGM is used as a punishment for any perceived wrongdoing against Sande members. In 2021, for example, a case made national headlines because Sande members kidnapped five girls and forcefully initiated them due to allegations of public disturbances and the usage of obscene language on sacred land.

== Violence against Liberian activists and journalists ==
Journalist Mae Azango received death threats from several Sande society women for reporting on Sande FGM practices in 2012. FGM is considered a volatile and taboo topic of conversation in Liberia, and even international aid organizations refuse to speak publicly about their work. According to the director of a Liberian aid group, "this is a very sensitive issue, and we need to make sure we are respecting the security and safety of our staff and partners.”

== See also ==
- Female genital mutilation
- Prevalence of female genital mutilation
- Secret society

== Other sources and further reading ==
- Abraham, Arthur. Mende Government and Politics under Colonial Rule, Sierra Leone Univ. Press (dist.by Oxford), 1978. ISBN 0-19-711638-8
- Bledsoe, Caroline. Women and Marriage in Kpelle Society. Stanford: Stanford University Press, 1980. ISBN 0-8047-1019-8
- Boone, Sylvia A. Radiance from the Waters: Ideals of Feminine Beauty in Mende Art. (Yale Publications in the History of Art 34). New Haven: Yale University Press, 1986. ISBN 0-300-03576-4
- Dapper, O. Naukeurige Beschrijvinge der Afrikaensche Gewesten van Egypten, Barbaryen, Libyen, Biledulgerid, Guinea, Ethiopiën, Abyssine ..., Amsterdam: J. van Meurs, 1668.
- Day, Lynda Rose. The Female Chiefs of the Mende, 1885-1977: Tracing the Evolution of an Indigenous Political Institution. Ph.D. dissertation, University of Wisconsin-Madison, 1988.
- d'Azevedo, Warren L. (1962) Some Historical Problems in the Delineation of A Central West Atlantic Region. Annals of the New York Academy of Sciences 96: 512–538.
- d'Azevedo, Warren L. (1980) African Art of the West Atlantic Coast: Transition in Form and Content, by Frederick Lamp. L. Kahan Gallery, New York, 1979. African Arts 14(1): 81–88.
- Dubinskas, Frank A. "Everywoman" and the "Super"-Woman: An Investigation of the Sowo, Spirit of the Mende Women's Secret Society, Sande: The Relation of Her Form as an Ideological Construction to its Bases in the Social and Economic Position of Women. Unpublished manuscript, 1976.
- Easmon, M. C. F. (1958) Madam Yoko: Ruler of the Mendi Confederacy. Sierra Leone Studies (n.s.) 11: 165–168.
- Holsoe, Svend E. (1980) Notes on the Vai Sande Society in Liberia. Ethnologische Zeitschrift 1: 97–109.
- Jedrej, M. C. (1990) Structural Aspects of a West African Secret Society. Ethnologische Zeitschrift 1: 133–142.
- Jedrej, M. C. (1986) Cosmology and Symbolism on the Central Guinea Coast. Anthropos 81: 497–515.
- Lamp, Frederick (1985) Cosmos, Cosmetics, and the Spirit of Bondo, African Arts, 18:3, 28-43+98-99.
- Leopold, Robert S. (1983) The Shaping of Men and the Making of Metaphors: The Meaning of White Clay in Poro and Sande Initiation Society Rituals. Anthropology 7(2): 21–42.
- MacCormack, Carol P. [Hoffer] Madam Yoko: Ruler of the Kpa Mende Confederacy. In Woman, Culture and Society, edited by Michele Z. Rosaldo and Louise Lamphere, pp. 171–187, 333–334. Stanford: Stanford University Press, 1974. ISBN 0-8047-0850-9
- MacCormack, Carol P. [Hoffer]. Bundu: Political Implications of Female Solidarity in a Secret Society. In Being Female: Reproduction, Power, and Change, edited by Dana Raphael, pp. 155–163. The Hague: Mouton, 1975. ISBN 0-202-01151-8
- MacCormack, Carol P. [Hoffer]. Health, Fertility and Birth in Moyamba District, Sierra Leone. In Ethnography of Fertility and Birth. C. P. MacCormack, ed. pp. 115–139. NY: Academic Press, 1982. ISBN 0-12-463550-4
- Phillips, Ruth. B. (1995) Representing Woman: Sande Masquerades of the Mende of Sierra Leone. Los Angeles: UCLA Fowler Museum of Cultural History. ISBN 0-930741-45-5
- Sawyerr, Harry and S. K. Todd (1970) The Significance of the Numbers Three and Four among the Mende of Sierra Leone. Sierra Leone Studies (n.s.) 26: 29–36.
