= Hirondelle News Agency =

The Hirondelle News Agency is a news agency based at the International Criminal Tribunal for Rwanda (ICTR) in Arusha, Tanzania. The Hirondelle News Agency has been covering judicial proceedings linked to the 1994 genocide in Rwanda ever since the ICTR started working. Thus it enables the populations of the African Great Lakes region to follow the work of the court. The agency is part of the Fondation Hirondelle, which creates or supports independent, civic-minded news media in conflict, post-conflict and crisis zones. It currently has projects in the Democratic Republic of Congo, South Sudan, the Central African Republic, Mali, Guinea and Tunisia.
