= FrontPage Africa =

Liberian daily newspaper

- Type: Daily newspaper
- Founder: Rodney Sieh
- Founded: 2005
- Language: English
- Headquarters: Monrovia
- Circulation: 1,500
- Website: frontpageafricaonline.com

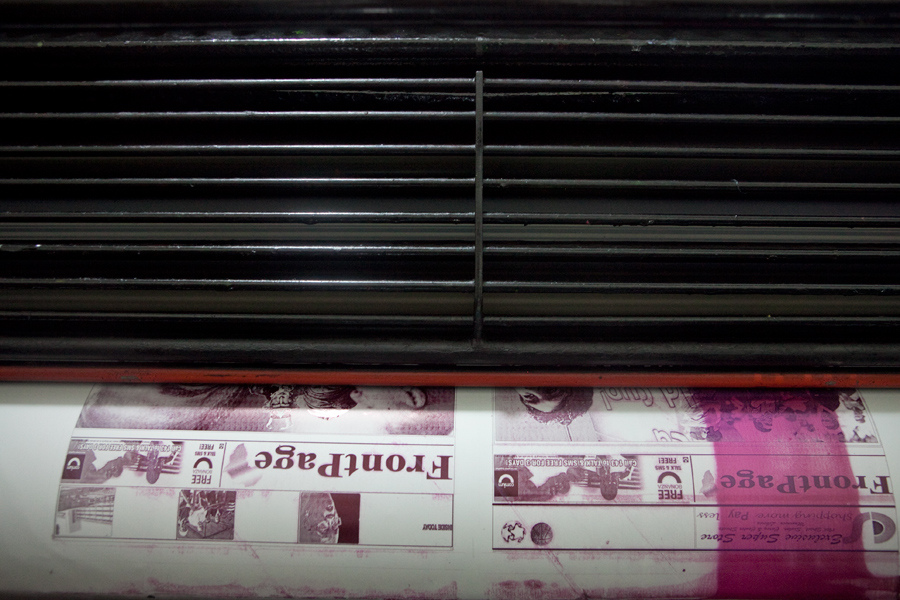
The business end of the printing press for Front Page Africa, a daily newspaper based in Monrovia Liberia.

FrontPage Africa is a Liberian daily newspaper founded in 2005 by Rodney Sieh. As of 2012, it had a circulation of 1,500. FrontPage Africa has received international recognition for its investigative journalism, and the Christian Science Monitor called it the nation's "leading investigative daily". The paper has run stories on teenage prostitution, government corruption, and an alleged rape by a police officer. In 2012, a story by reporter Mae Azango on female genital mutilation sparked national controversy and led to the official suspension of the practice. In the same year, the publisher and editor were charged with contempt after publishing reports that members of the Supreme Court of Liberia had embezzled international aid money.

== Early history ==
FrontPage Africa was founded in 2005 by Rodney Sieh, a veteran of several US daily newspapers. Originally an online-only publication, the newspaper began to print copies in 2008, expanding to a circulation of 1,500, which were collated and folded manually.

In 2010, FrontPage Africa, Sieh, and reporter Samwar Fallah were sued for libel by Christopher Toe, a former Agriculture Minister, who demanded US$2 million in damages; the newspaper had reported that he had embezzled millions of dollars from public funds. The World Association of Newspapers issued a statement on the paper's behalf, stating that while it had no opinion on the merits of the case itself, the amount sought was clearly punitive.

== 2012 female genital mutilation story ==
On 8 March 2012—International Women's Day—Front Page Africa published a story by Mae Azango telling of a woman who was held down by five other women while her clitoris was amputated. The story detailed the procedure, which the Sande consider secret. The paper received so many threats the day that the story appeared that editor Wade Williams called to tell her to go into hiding. The threats included that Azango herself would be "caught and cut". After local police failed to take action against the threats, Azango went into hiding, sending her nine-year-old daughter to stay with relatives.

The Committee to Protect Journalists (CPJ), a US-based press NGO, called on Liberian president Ellen Johnson Sirleaf to issue Azango protection and guarantee her safety. Amnesty International and Reporters Without Borders also issued statements of support, as did the Columbia Journalism School and the International Federation of Journalists. Radio journalist Tetee Gebro of the Liberian station Sky FM broadcast a version of Azango's story in a show of solidarity.

Before the end of the month, in part due to domestic and international pressure sparked by the incident, Sirleaf's government announced that it had agreed with traditional leaders that the practice of FGM would be officially suspended. The statement was the first time Liberian politicians had publicly criticized the practice of FGM.

== See also ==
- List of newspapers in Liberia
