= The Liberian Journal =

The Liberian Journal (TLJ) was a US-based Liberian online news site which was available online from 2008 to 2020. It covered issues of interest to Liberians in the Diaspora, including developments in post-conflict Liberia. It also published news about Africa and many defining events around the world. It provided news and information on developments in the spheres of politics, economics, sports, health, entertainment, and other areas.

== History ==
Established April 8, 2008, the Minnesota-based Liberian news outfit also publishes about 15,000 free copies of monthly print newspapers.

Published and edited by Abdullah Kiatamba, a Liberian activist and writer, includes contributions by Liberian writers, including exiled Liberian journalists and U.S-trained news reporters and editors. TLJ’s list of writers also includes Liberian scholars, professors, women leaders, activists, and many non-Liberians.

== The Liberian Journal today ==
The Liberian Journal interviewed several people linked to Liberia, including President Ellen Johnson-Sirleaf, Vice-President Joseph Boakai, presidential candidate George Weah, and other Liberian Diaspora leaders.

The Internet Archive catalogs content for The Liberian Journal starting March 10th, 2008 through January 17th, 2020. Archives of the domain through 2025 return a placeholder page from domain provider GoDaddy page with a "Get This Domain" button.

== Contributors ==
Momoh S. Dudu: Dudu fled the Liberian civil war in 1989, spending six years in Guinea where he worked with the UNHCR and International Rescue Committee to assist other refugees. After winning a scholarship to the United States, he earned a PhD and authored multiple books.

Jackie Sayegh: Sayegh is an Administrator for Cornell University’s Institute for African Development, where she helps to highlight the multifaceted nature of development challenges. Her work focuses on studying indigenous coping strategies and associational structures to better support displaced women and youth.

Dr. Emmanuel Dolo: Dolo was a distinguished Liberian public policy scholar who worked in both the government and private sectors, including as an advisor to President Ellen Johnson Sirleaf. He was a prolific writer, publishing multiple books and articles, and his legacy is defined by his commitment to understanding and improving Liberia.
