= Körte =

The surname Körte may have two etymologies. The word literally means "pear" in Hungarian and may be an occupational surname for a fruit grower or seller. It may also be a Westphalian version for "Kurt". Notable people with this surname include:

- Alfred Körte (1866–1946), German philologist
- Franz Körte (1782–1845), German natural and agricultural scientist
- Gustav Körte (1852–1917), German archeologist
- Peter Körte (1896–1947), Wehrmacht general
- Siegfried Körte, the namesake of the Körte-Oberlyzeum
- Werner Körte (1853–1937), German surgeon

== See also ==
- Korte (surname)
