= Korto =

Korto is both a given name and a surname. Notable people with the name include:

- Joseph Korto (1949–2020), Liberian politician
- Korto Reeves Williams, Liberian feminist activist

== See also ==
- Korte (surname)
