= Korto Reeves Williams =

Liberian feminist activist

Korto Reeves Williams is a Liberian feminist activist. She is the country director and women's rights coordinator of ActionAid Liberia, a board member of Urgent Action Fund (Africa), and a member of the Liberia Feminist Forum and the African Feminist Forum. It was through feminism that she found her clear purpose in life.

William's stated: "To build the feminist movement in Africa, we need more women to identify openly as feminists. We need to support documentation of feminist literature. And we need to hold feminist forums nationally as a means of outreaching and being more visible as feminists. Whenever I encounter the intellect of a woman, ready to challenge falsehoods that violate our rights I am inspired. I am humbled when African sisters provide this intellectual ambience!"

== Education ==
Williams has a master's degree in Sustainable Development from the School of International Training (now the SIT Graduate Institute) in Vermont, United States.

== Career ==
Williams is the women's rights coordinator of ActionAid Liberia, and the country director.

In her visit to Liberia in February 2011, the actress Emma Thompson noted a "huge UN presence" on her way from the airport, and spoke with Williams about this, who told her she soon left her job with the UN, as "it was not designed for young activists who wanted to see things being done on the ground".

Her academic publications include Beyond Mass Action: A Study Of Collective Organizing Among Liberian Women Using Feminist Movement Perspectives. Williams has frequently contributed to ActionAid International's magazine, Common Cause, as well as a book, Voice, Power and Soul: A Portrait of African Feminists.

In a September 2017 op-ed in The Bush Chicken (which also appeared as an Africa at LSE blog post on the London School of Economics website), Williams (and her co-author Robtel Neajai Pailey) were critical of Liberia's President Ellen Johnson Sirleaf, Africa's first elected woman head of state. They stated that in her 12 years in charge, she had achieved "next to nothing to position women favorably to win votes".
