= Nienhaus =

Amtshaus Nienhaus
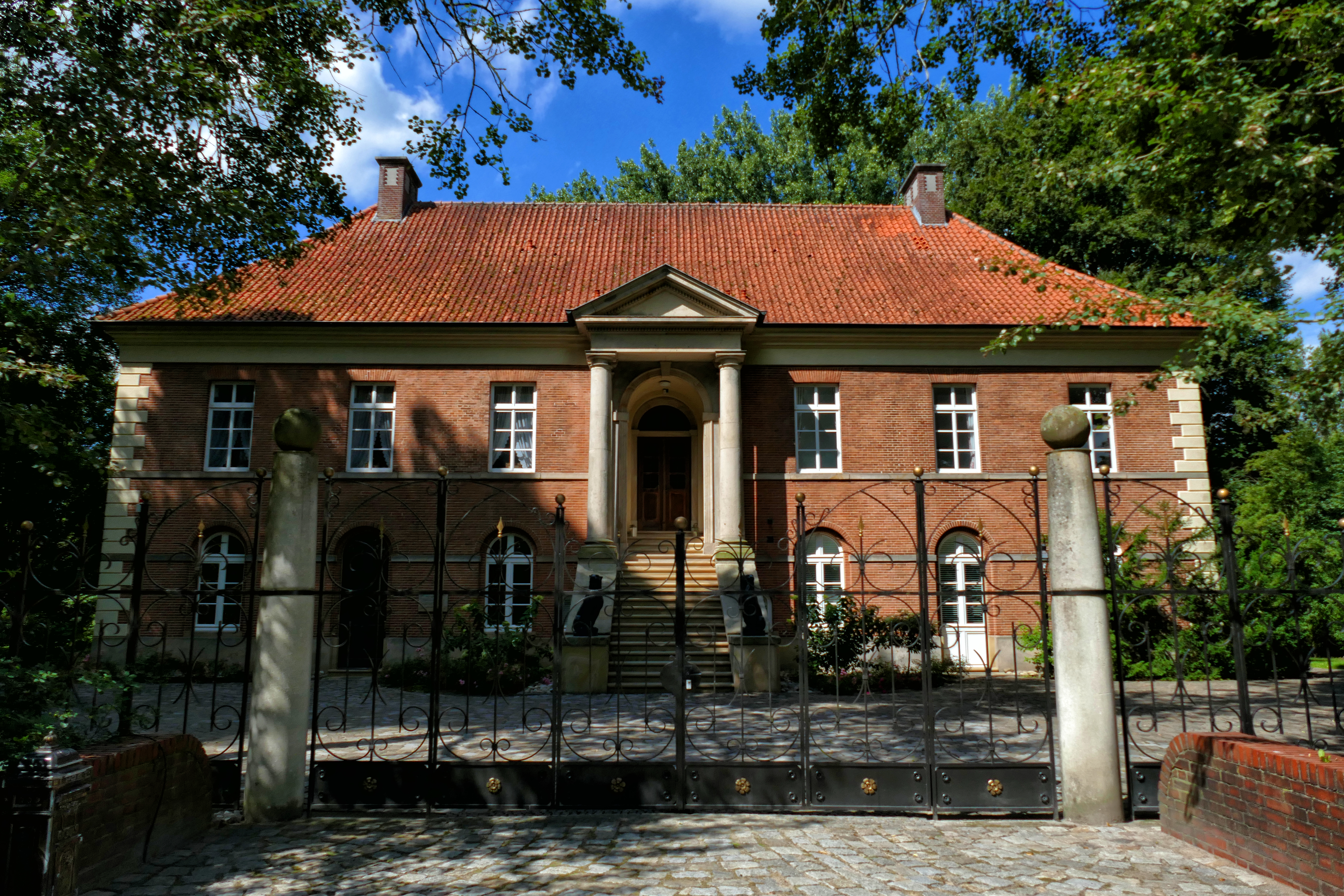
- Alternative names: Nien House,

General information
- Town or city: Aschendorf, Papenburg
- Country: Germany
- Year(s) built: 1832–1836

Technical details
- Floor count: 2

Design and construction
- Architect(s): Josef Niehaus
- Known for: Birthplace of Theodora Korte

Amtshaus ("Governor's house") Nienhaus is a late neoclassic building in Aschendorf, near Papenburg. In addition to being an office building, it also housed the local governor and his family. The Nienhaus is also remembered as being the birthplace of the author Theodora Korte.

== History ==
The house was built between 1832 and 1836 on the former site of Nienhaus Castle, just outside Aschendorf. The architect was Josef Niehaus, who also designed Mickeln House. At the time, Aschendorf was still part of the Kingdom of Hanover. Over the next thirty years, it would house five consecutive governors:

1. Lambert Cordes (1828–1832)
2. Wilhelm Christian Carl von Dincklage (1832–1838)
3. Claus Jürgen Melchior von Issendorf (1838–1848)
4. Anton Niehaus (1848–1860)
5. Johann-Heinrich Felix Korte (1860–1889)

In 1866, the Kingdom of Hanover was annexed by Prussia. Aschendorf district and its 20.000 inhabitants now fell under the Province of Hanover. In 1871, Prussia and the other German states were unified as the German Empire. In 1899, the governor of Aschendorf's office was moved to Haus Altenkamp.

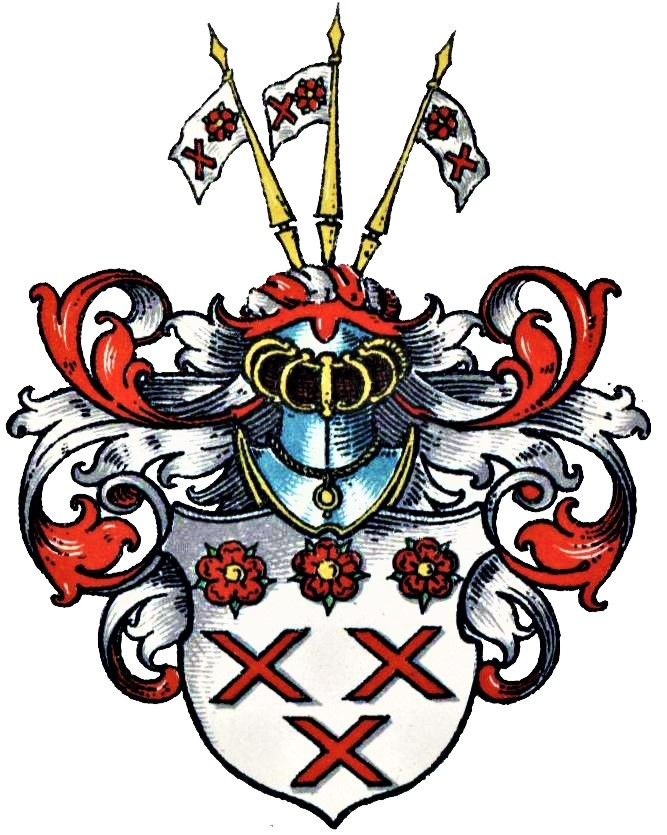
von Dincklage

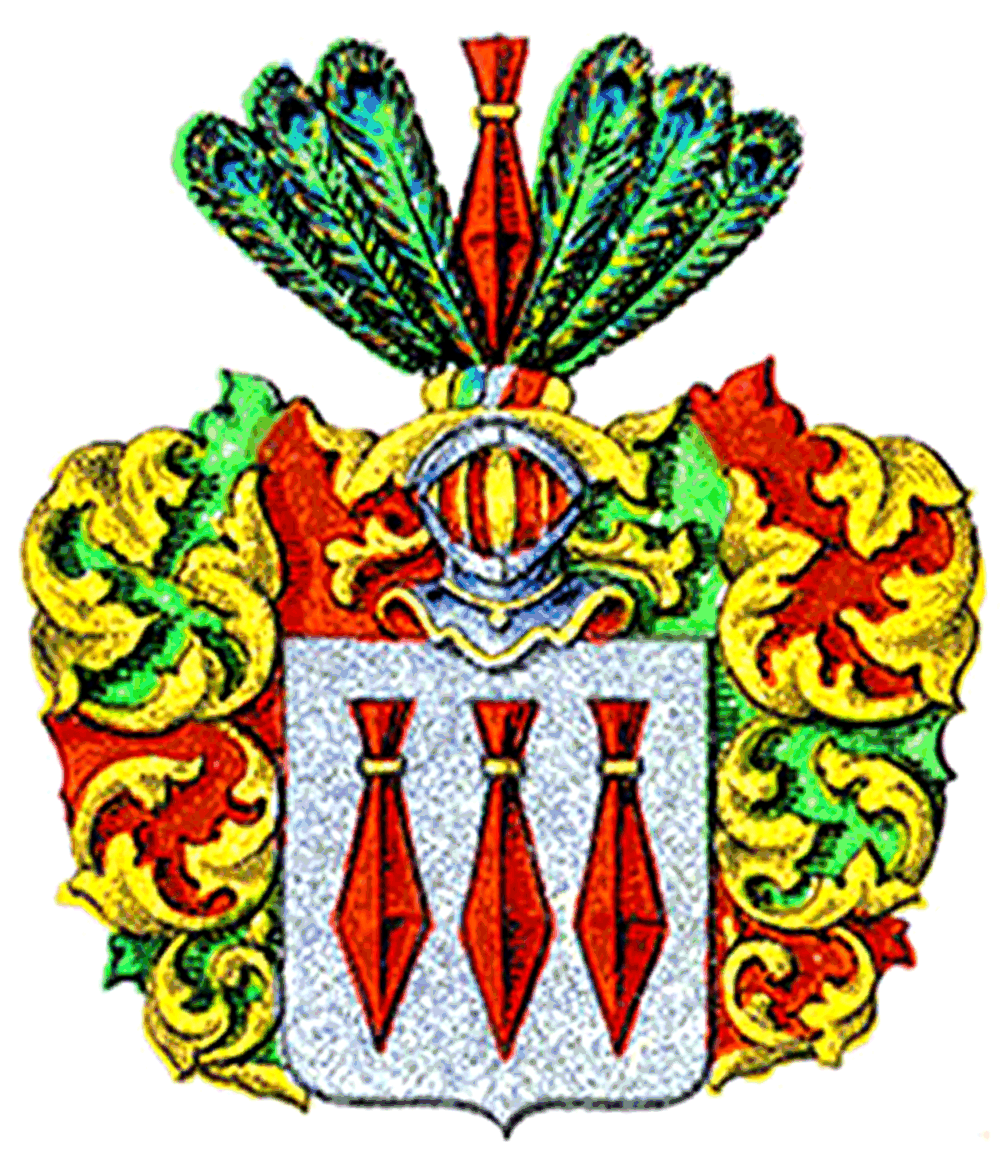
Issendorf

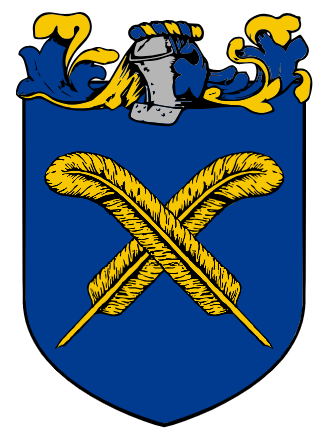
Korte

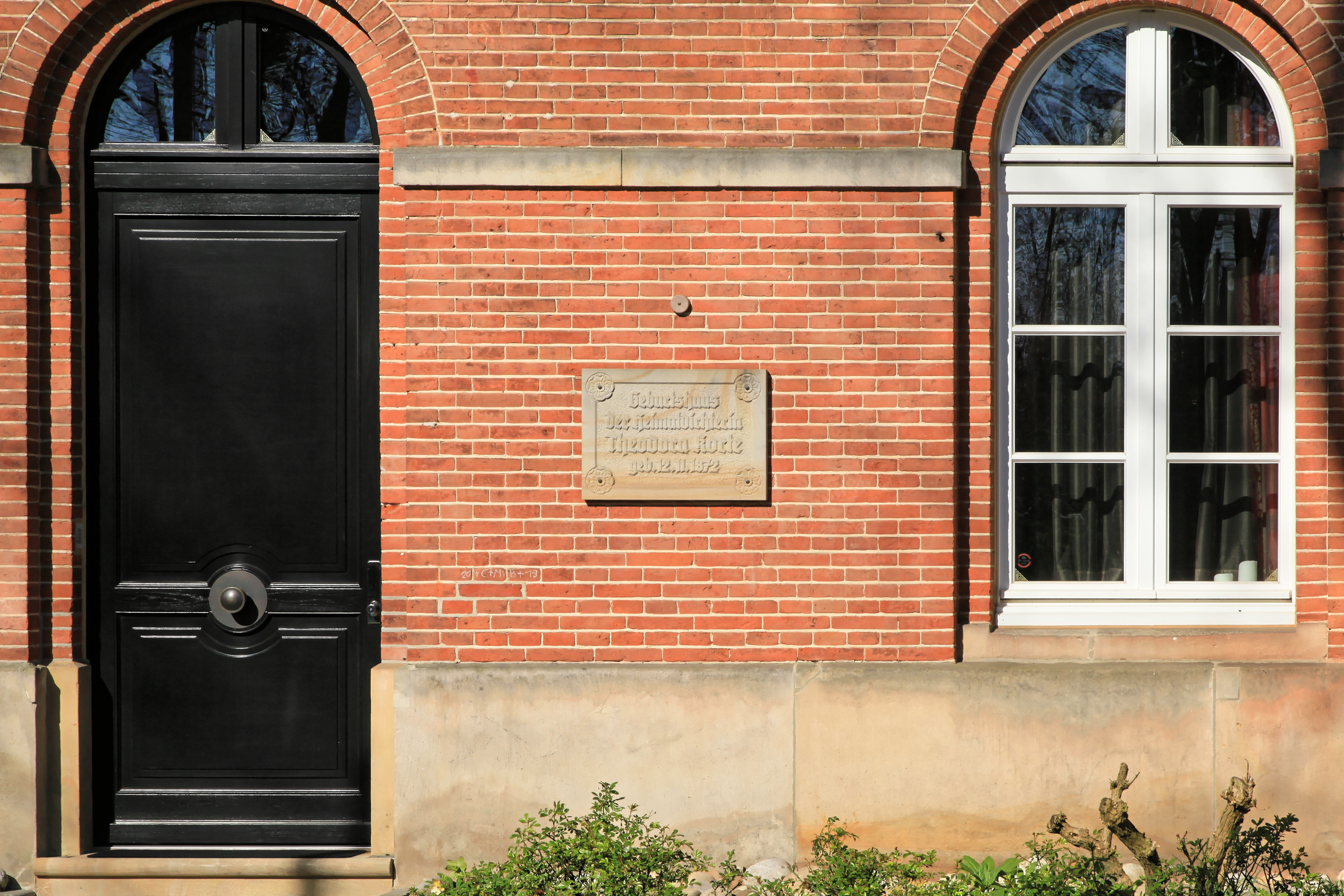
Theodora Korte's plaque

== Description ==
The building is completely made from brick. Even the sandstone corners are, in fact, painted bricks. The only real sandstone was used for the base of the building, the windowsills and the columns. It has two floors, and a grande staircase leads from the gates to the main entrance on the upper floor. Between two Doric columns, there is a portal, above which an architrave rests underneath a triangular fronton. Behind the main entrance, a vestibule leads guests to the main office.

The ground floor windows are arched. This architectural detail is often found in the work of Georg Ludwig Friedrich Laves, who was Josef Niehaus' colleague.

A plaque commemorates the birth of the author Theodora Korte (1872–1926), who was born at the Nienhaus during the tenure of her father, Johann-Heinrich Felix Korte.

== Sources ==
- Georg Dehio (Hrsg.): Handbuch der deutschen Kunstdenkmäler. Bd. 2: Bremen/Niedersachsen, Neubearb., München 1992, ISBN 3-422-03022-0, S. 141.
- Roswitha Poppe: . In: Verein für Geschichte und Landeskunde von Osnabrück (Hrsg.): . Band 68. Meinders & Elstermann (J.G. Kisling), Osnabrück 1959, S. 272–308.
