= De Korte =

De Korte is a Dutch surname meaning "the short (one)". Thus, Pepin the Short is known as "Pepijn de Korte" in Dutch. Variants are "De Corte", "De Kort" and "De Cort", as well as concatenated forms. People with this surname include:

De Korte

- Gerard de Korte (born 1955), Dutch Roman Catholic bishop
- Joke de Korte (born 1935), Dutch swimmer
- Maurice De Korte (1889–1971), Belgian sculptor
- Rudolf de Korte (1936–2020), Dutch politician

DeKorte

- Richard W. DeKorte (1936–1975), American (New Jersey) politician

De Kort

- Bram de Kort (born 1991), Dutch racing cyclist
- Gérard de Kort (born 1963), Dutch swimmer
- Hein de Kort (born 1956), Dutch cartoonist
- Kees de Kort (1934–2022), Dutch painter and illustrator
- Koen de Kort (born 1982), Dutch cyclist

Dekort

- Michael DeKort, American whistleblower

De Corte

- Jean De Corte (1551–1628), gunpowder manufacturer from Liège
- Josse de Corte (1627–1679), Flemish sculptor
- Jules de Corte (1924–1996), Dutch blind singer-songwriter
- Marcel De Corte (1929–2017), Belgian footballer
- Thomas De Corte (born 1988), Belgian footballer
- Wim De Corte (born 1971), Belgian football manager

Decorte

- Alphonse Decorte (1909–1977), Belgian footballer
- Raymond Decorte (1898–1972), Belgian road bicycle racer

De Cort

- Frans de Cort (1834–1878), Flemish writer
- Hendrik de Cort (1742/5–1810), Flemish landscape painter

== See also ==
- Korte (disambiguation)
