= Adolf Klügmann =

German archaeologist and numismatist (1837–1880)

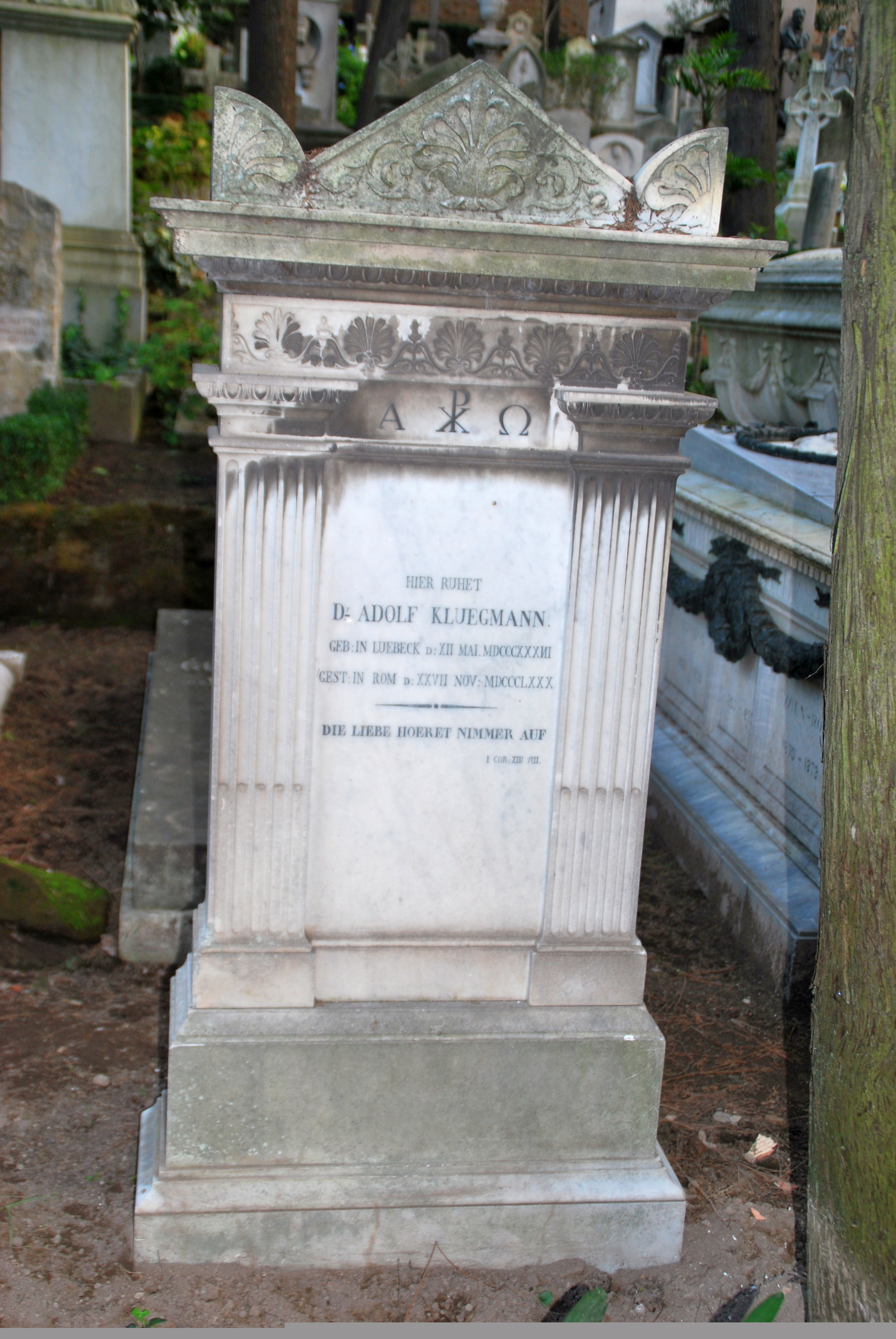
Grave of Klügmann at the Protestant Cemetery, Rome.

Adolf Klügmann (12 May 1837 in Lübeck – 27 November 1880 in Rome) was a German classical archaeologist and numismatist born in Lübeck.

He was a pupil to Otto Jahn (1813–1869) at the University of Bonn, then continued his studies at the Universities of Berlin and Göttingen. Due to poor health, from 1861 onward, he spent almost his entire life in Rome.

From 1873, he worked as an unpaid librarian at the Deutsches Archäologisches Institut in Rome. In 1878 he was editor of the "Corpus Speculorum Etruscorum" (project to publish all existing Etruscan bronze mirrors), a project begun by Eduard Gerhard (1795–1867), and after Klügmann's death, continued by Gustav Körte (1852–1917).

In addition to the Etruscan mirrors, Klügmann performed research in the fields of Roman numismatics, ancient mythology (particularly Amazons) and Greek vase painting.

== Written works ==
- Die Amazonen in der attischen Literatur und Kunst. (The Amazons in Athenian literature and art) Eine archaeologische Abhandlung, 1875.
- Etruskische Spiegel. (Etruscan mirror) Volume 5, Reimer, Berlin 1897.
