= Alfred Körte =

German classical philologist (1866–1946)

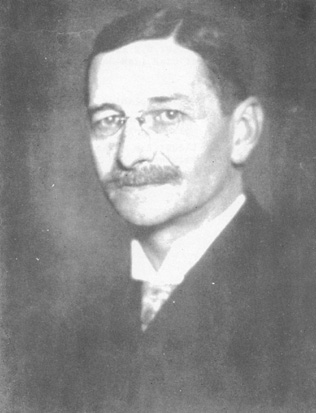
- Born: 5 September 1866
- Died: 6 September 1946 (aged 80)
- Occupation: Philologist
- Relatives: Werner Körte (brother); Gustav Körte (brother)

Alfred Körte (5 September 1866 – 6 September 1946) was a German classical philologist who was a native of Berlin. He was a younger brother to surgeon Werner Körte (1853–1937) and archaeologist Gustav Körte (1852-1917). In 1896, he married Frieda Gropius, the daughter of the architect Martin Gropius (1824–1880).

In 1890, he earned his doctorate from the University of Bonn, where he was a student of Hermann Usener (1834–1905). In 1899, he became a full professor at the University of Greifswald, and in 1903 was successor to Erich Bethe (1863–1940) at the University of Basel. Successively, he was a professor at the Universities of Giessen (from 1906), Freiburg (from 1914) and Leipzig (from 1917), where he remained until his retirement in 1934. Körte was a member of the Saxon Academy of Sciences and the German Archaeological Institute.

Alfred Körte was a leading expert in the study of Greek comedies, being remembered for his editorial and translational work involving papyrus fragments left by the dramatist Menander. He also specialized in the field of Hellenistic poetry.

In 1900, he assisted his brother, Gustav, with the initial excavation of the ancient city of Gordion in Asia Minor, subsequently being the co-author of Gordion: Ergebnisse der Ausgrabung im Jahre 1900 (1904).

Beginning in 1923, with philologist Richard Heinze (1867–1929), he was publisher of the magazine "Hermes". He also contributed numerous articles to the "Pauly-Wissowa", a renowned German encyclopedia of classical scholarship.

== Selected works ==
- "Kleinasiatische Studien, I", Athenische Mitteilungen 20 (1895): 1–19
- Anatolische Skizzen, Berlin: Julius Springer, 1896
- review of "En Phrygie" by Georges Radet, Göttingische Gelehrte Anzeigen 159 (1897): 386–416
