= Erik van Lieshout =

Dutch contemporary artist

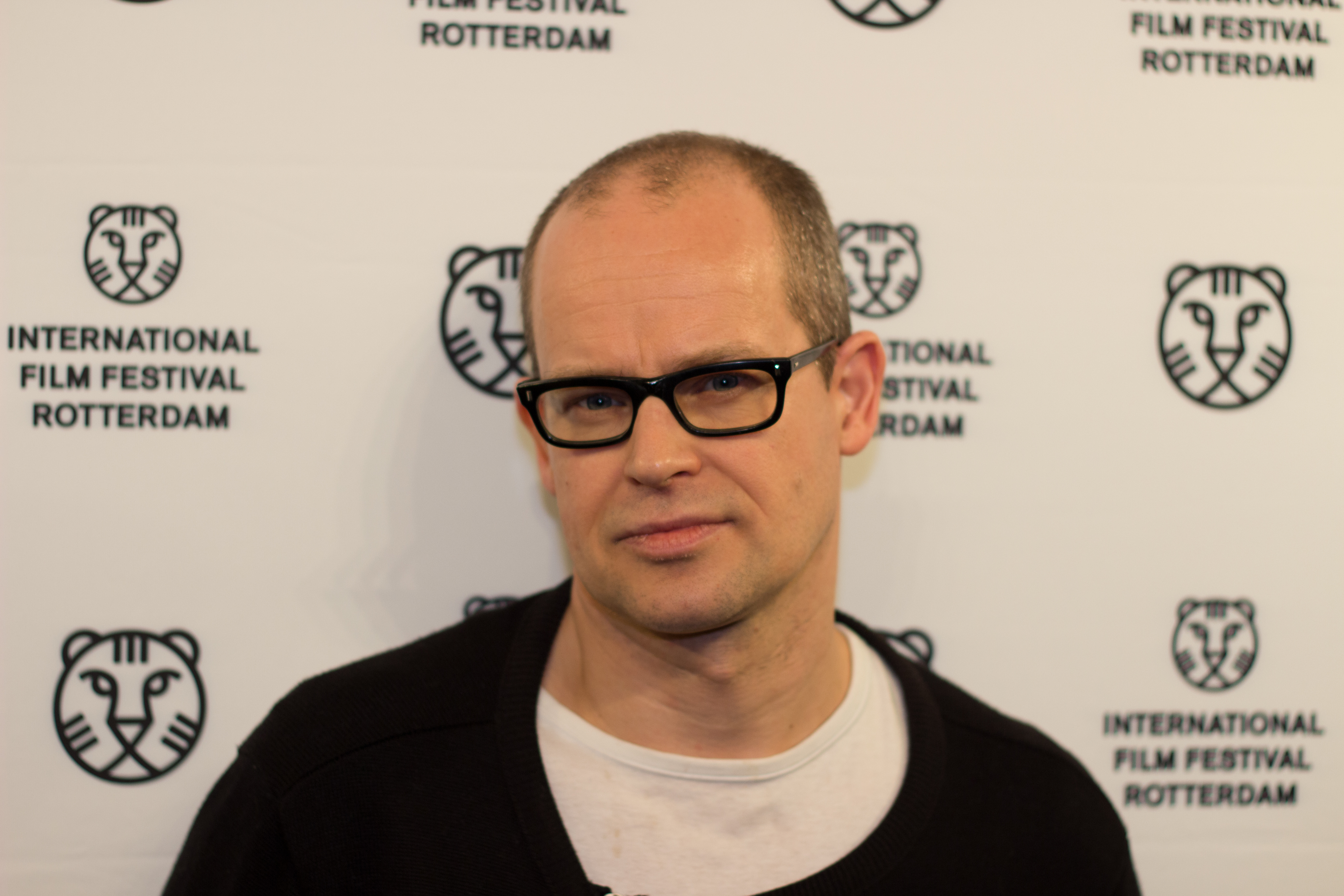
- Erik van Lieshout at the International Film Festival Rotterdam
- Born: Erik van Lieshout; January 15, 1968 (age 58); Deurne
- Awards: Heineken Prize
- Website: erikvanlieshout.com

Erik Gerardus Franciscus van Lieshout is a Dutch contemporary artist most widely known for his installations. In 2018, he won the Heineken Prize for Art.

== Biography ==
Erik van Lieshout was resident from 1990 to 1992 at de Ateliers ’63 in Haarlem (now De Ateliers Amsterdam). Van Lieshout lived in New York, Berlin, Cologne and now lives in Rotterdam.

At the 50th Venice Biennale (2003) he participated in the group show ‘We are the World’ curated by Rein Wolfs for the Dutch Pavilion. Previous solo exhibitions include René Daniëls, Museum de Pont Tilburg, together with René Daniëls; Three Social Works, South London Gallery, London, 2017; Sündenbock (Scapegoat), Kunstverein Hannover, Hannover, Germany, 2017; Erik van Lieshout: The Show Must Ego On, WIELS Contemporary Art Centre, Brussels, 2016; Commission, MMK Museum für Moderne Kunst, Frankfurt, 2012; Erik makes Happy, BAWAG Contemporary, Vienna, 2011; How Can I Help You, Hayward Gallery Project Space, London, 2011; Im Netz, Ludwig Museum, Cologne, 2009; Homeland Security, Projekt am Museumsplatz, Städtische Galerie im Lenbachhaus, Munich, 2007 and Guantánamo Baywatch, Hammer Projects, Hammer Museum, UCLA, Los Angeles, 2007. Recent group exhibitions include Ammodo Tiger Short Competition, International Film Festival Rotterdam, Rotterdam, Netherlands, 2020; Stedelijk Base, video works from the collection with Michael Smith, Grayson Perry, Liza May Post, Erik van Lieshout and General Idea, Stedelijk Museum Amsterdam, 2020; Weil Ich Nun Mal Hier Lebe (Because I Live Here), Museum für Moderne Kunst, Frankfurt, 2018; Unfinished Conversations, New Work from the Collection, MoMA, New York 2017; Forming in the pupil of an eye, Kochi-Muziris Biennale, Kochi, Kerala 2016; Manifesta 10, The European Biennial of Contemporary Art, curated by Kasper König, St. Petersburg, 2014.

His works can be find in the collections of MoMA New York, Stedelijk Museum Amsterdam, Centre Pompidou Paris, MMK Frankfurt, Hammer Museum Los Angeles, Walker Art Center Minneapolis, Albertina Vienna, amongst many other public and private collections. In 2018, he won the Heineken Prize for Art.
