= Deurne, Netherlands =

Deurne
- Municipality
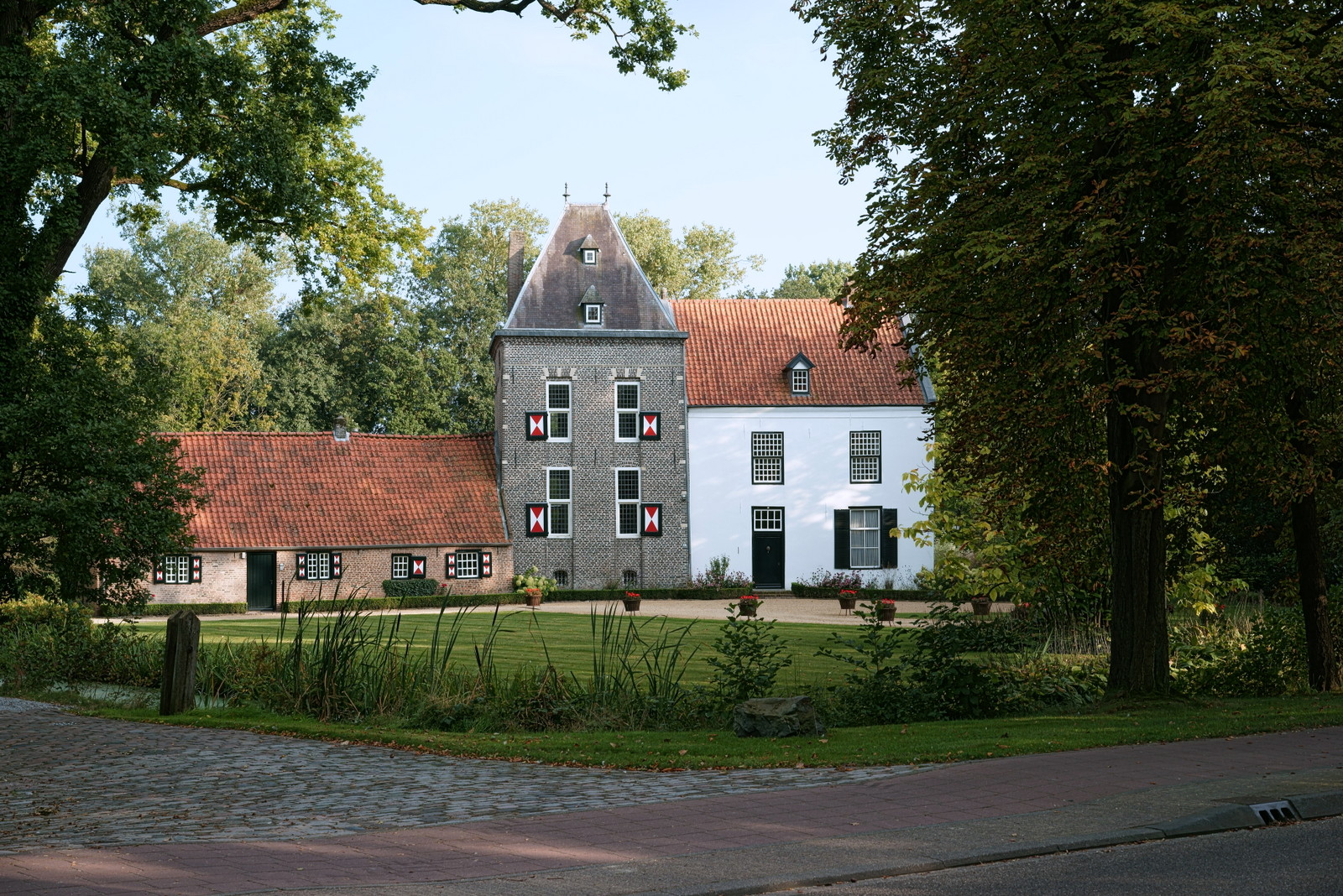
- Klein Kasteel castle in Deurne

- Flag Coat of arms

- Location in North Brabant
- Coordinates: 51°28′N 5°48′E
- Country: Netherlands
- Province: North Brabant

Government
  - Body: Municipal council
  - Mayor: Greet Buter (PvdA)

Area
  - Total: 118.36 km^{2} (45.70 sq mi)
  - Land: 116.93 km^{2} (45.15 sq mi)
  - Water: 1.43 km^{2} (0.55 sq mi)
- Elevation: 26 m (85 ft)

Population (January 2021)
  - Total: 32,437
  - Density: 277/km^{2} (720/sq mi)
- Time zone: UTC+1 (CET)
  - Summer (DST): UTC+2 (CEST)
- Postcode: 5750–5759
- Area code: 0493
- Website: www.deurne.nl
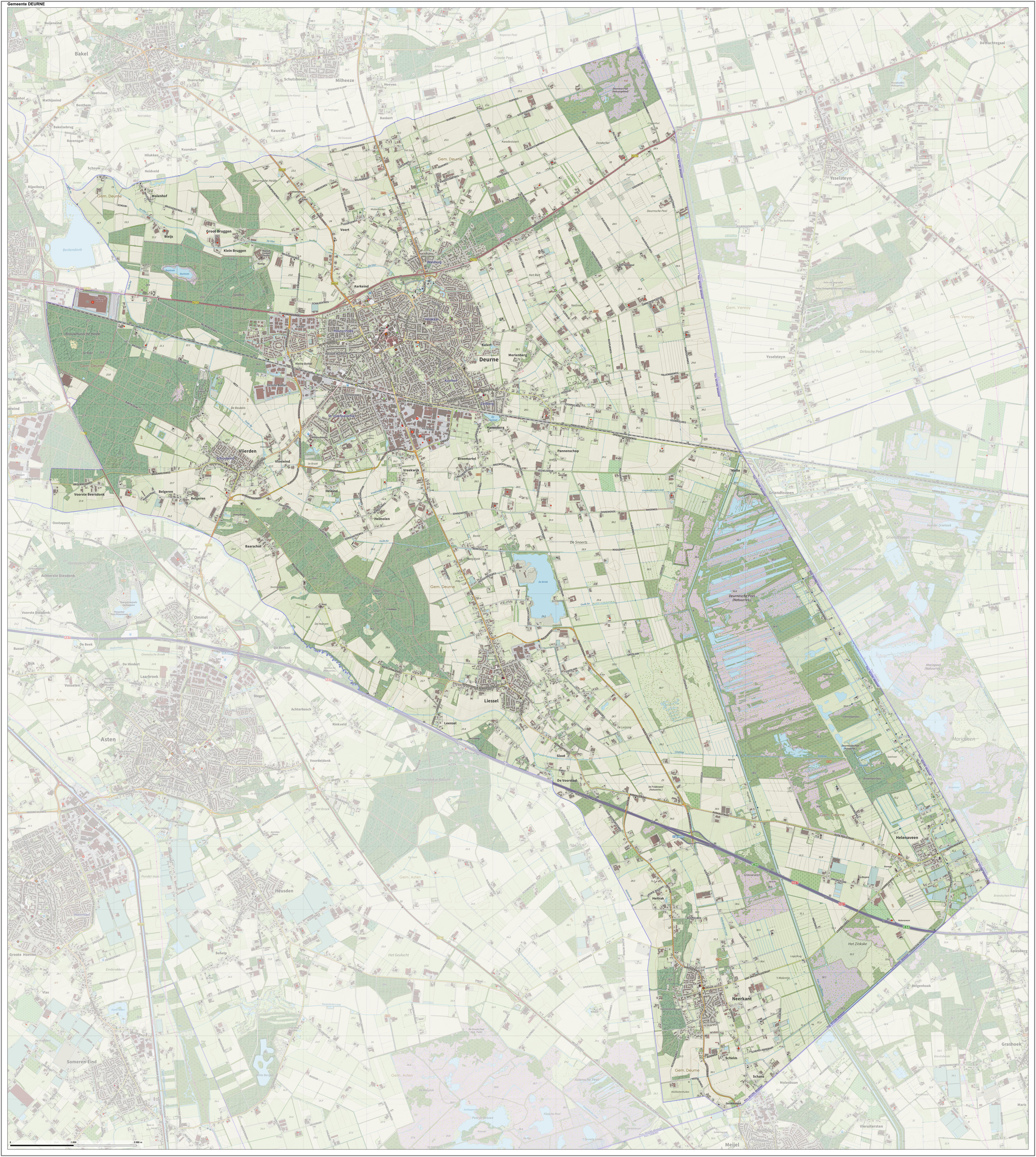
- Dutch Topographic map of the municipality of Deurne, June 2015

Deurne (Dutch pronunciation: [ˈdøːrnə]) is a rural municipality and eponymous village in the province of North Brabant in the Netherlands. Including the villages of Liessel, Vlierden, Neerkant, and Helenaveen, Deurne had a population of 32,437 in 2021 and covers an area of 118.36 km^{2} (45.70 sq mi).

== History ==
First recorded as Durninum (near / by thorns) in a deed of gift from the Frankish Lord Herelaef to bishop Willibrord in 721, Deurne remained a collection of subsistence farming hamlets west of the Peel peat moor until the 19th century, when a newly built railroad (Eindhoven - Venlo in 1866) and a canal (Zuid-Willemsvaart canal in 1826) enabled the commercial exploitation of the moor. Although the peat industry did not yield much of a profit in the era of coal-powered industries, the cultivation of the newly cleared land, in the 1930s also by forced labour, gave a boost to agriculture, farming, and settlement alike. Today only tiny pieces of this former peat moor remain, some reflooded as mini wetlands, scattered along the fault line that once brought about its very existence.

Coincidentally, the very same Anglo Dutch Griendtsveen Peat Moss Litter Company Ltd. that extracted a significant part of the peat in the Peel moved to Thorne (Moorends) South Yorkshire, U.K., where several of its Dutch employees settled as immigrant workers.

== Transportation ==
- Deurne railway station

== Culture ==
In 2009 the new "Cultural Centre" (cultureel centrum) opened its doors. It is the Martien van Doorne Cultuur Centrum and serves as a theatre, concert hall, and movie theatre.

The local dialect is Peellands (an East Brabantian dialect, which is very similar to colloquial Dutch).

== International relations ==
=== Twin towns – Sister cities ===
Deurne is twinned with:

Batouri in Cameroon	Leszno in Poland

== Notable people ==
- Lucas Gassel (c.1488 in Deurne – 1568 or 1569) Renaissance painter known for his landscapes
- Aaltje Noordewier–Reddingius (1868 in Deurne – 1949) Dutch classical soprano and voice teacher
- Jules de Corte (1924 in Deurne – 1996) blind singer-songwriter from the Netherlands
- Laurens van den Acker (born 1965 in Deurne) automobile designer
- Erik van Lieshout (born 1968 in Deurne) Dutch contemporary artist
- Yara Kastelijn (born 1997 in Deurne) Dutch racing cyclist

== Gallery ==
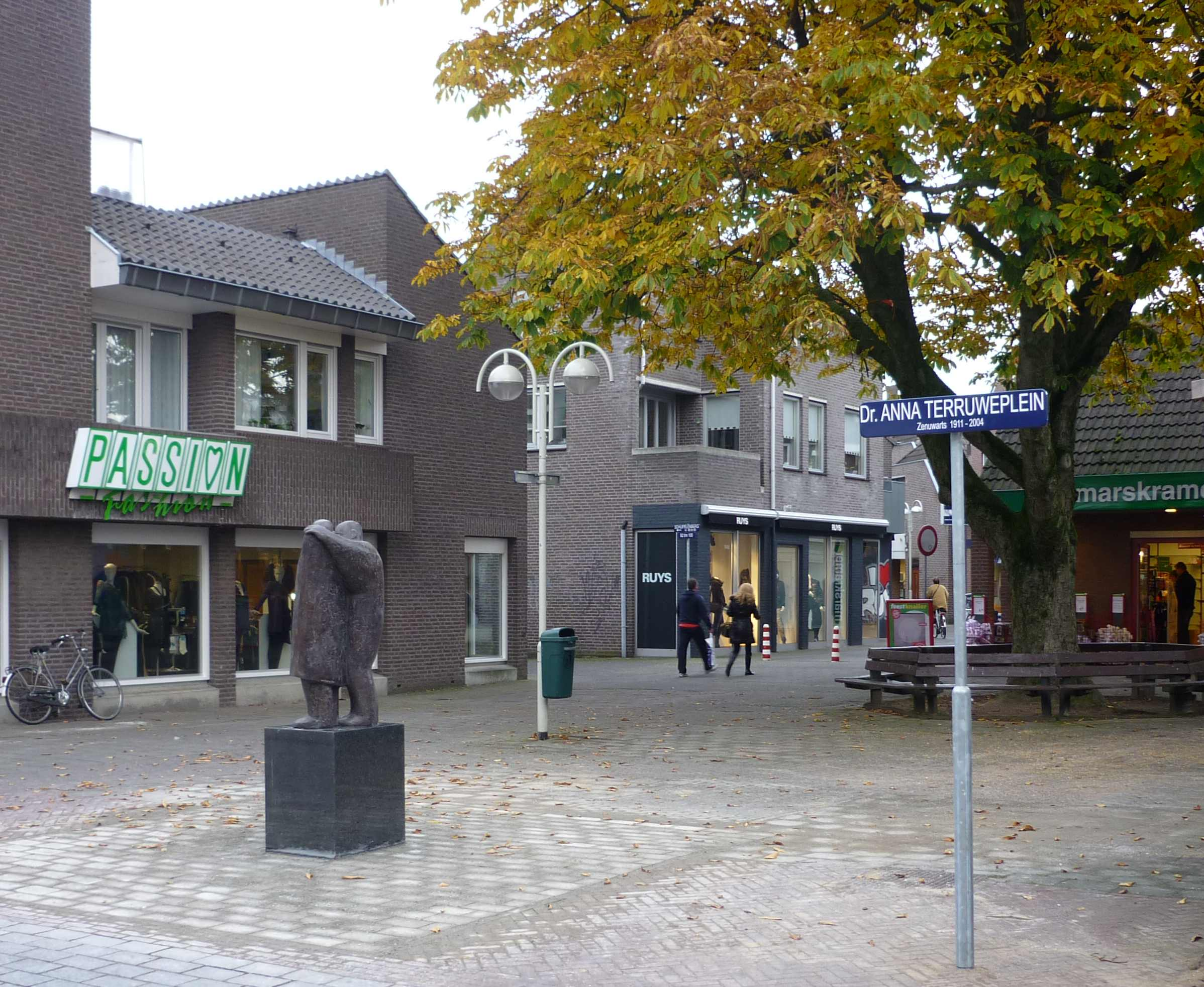
Dr. Anna Terruweplein, Deurne

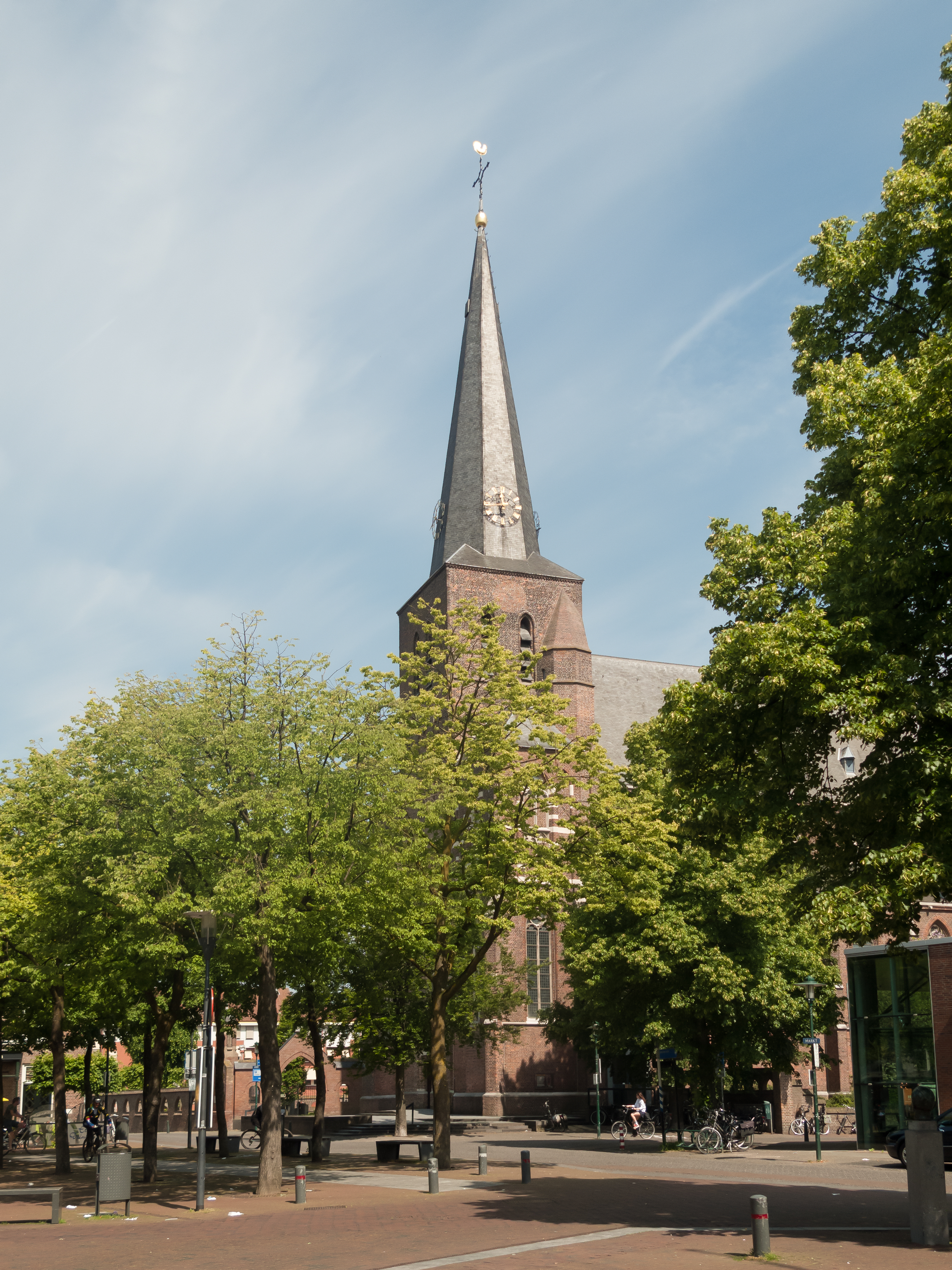
Deurne, church: de Sint Willibrorduskerk

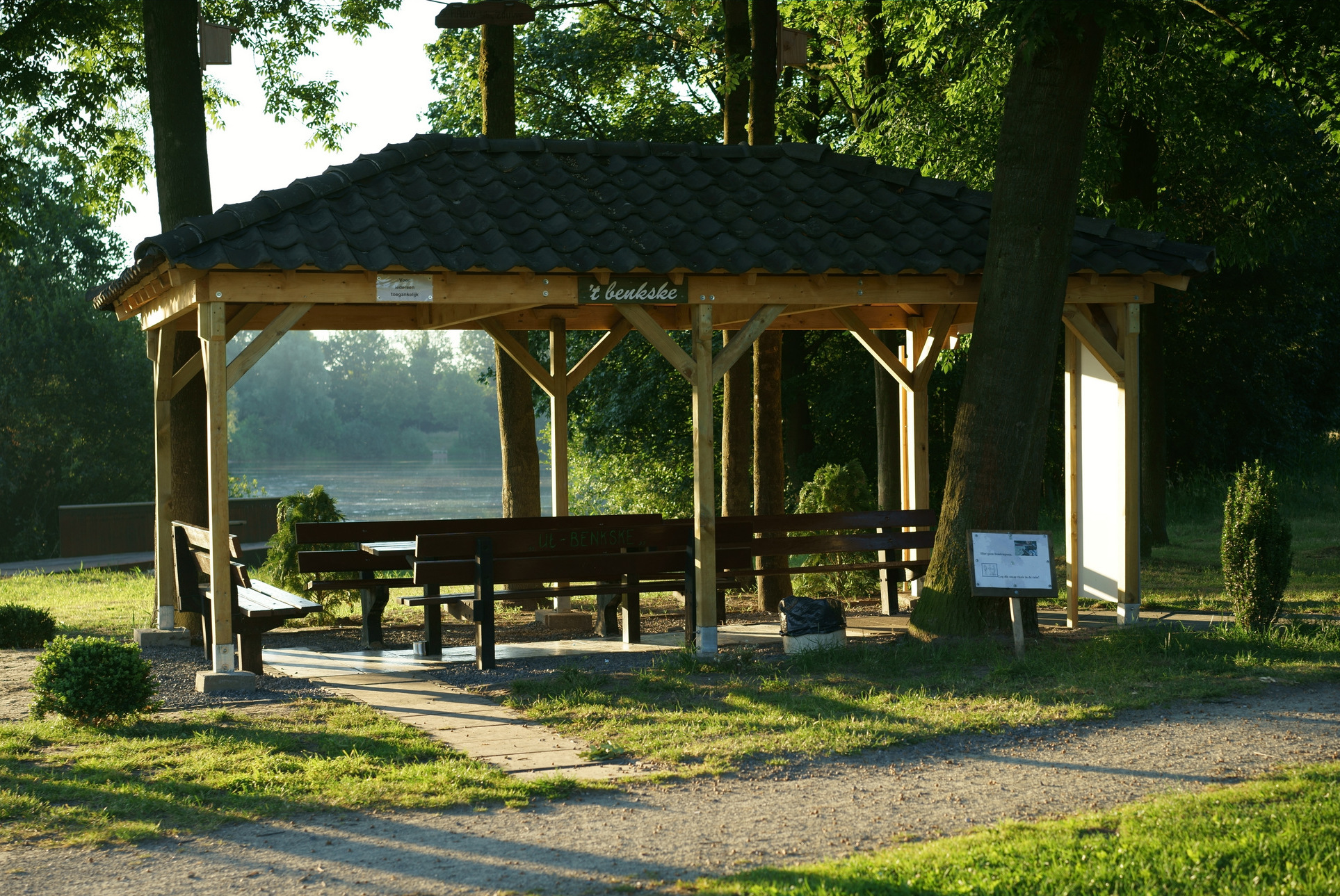
Wooden meeting place, known as Little Bench

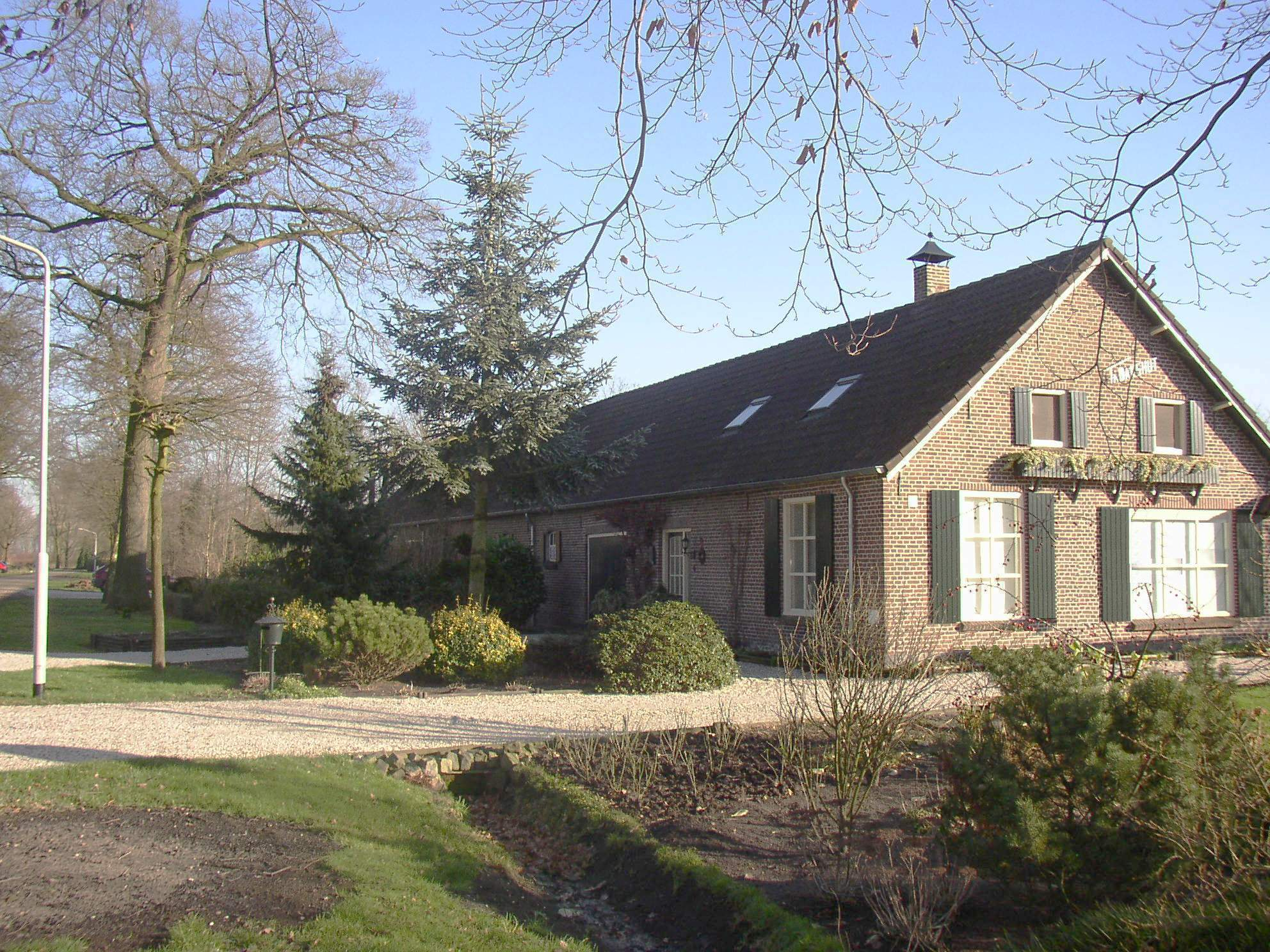
Geldersestraat 10-12
