= Korte (surname) =

The surname Korte may refer to:

- The surname Körte spelled without diacritics
- Theodora Korte (1872–1926), German author and poet
- Bernhard Korte (1938–2025), German mathematician and computer scientist
- Eero Korte (born 1987), Finnish football midfielder
- Elizabeth Korte, American television writer
- Gianluca Korte (born 1990), German footballer
- Jan Korte (footballer) (born 1956), former football player from the Netherlands
- Jan Korte (politician) (born 1977), German politician
- Hans Korte (1929–2016), German television actor
- Karl Korte (1928–2022), American composer of contemporary classical music
- Karl Korte, American jockey
- Karl-Rudolf Korte, German political scientist
- Oldřich František Korte (1926–2014), Czech composer, pianist, publicist and writer
- Pat Korte, American political activist and organizer for Students for a Democratic Society (SDS)
- Raffael Korte (born 1990), German footballer
- Ralph Korte, the namesake of the Ralph Korte Stadium
- Robin Korte (born 1988), German politician
- Steven Korte (born 1960), American football running back
- Steve Korte (born 1960), former offensive guard and center in the NFL

== See also ==
- De Korte, Dutch surname
