= Korte =

Korte may refer to:

- Korte (surname)
- Korte, Izola, a village in the Municipality of Izola, southeastern Slovenia (the Littoral region)
