= Werner Körte =

German surgeon (1853–1937)

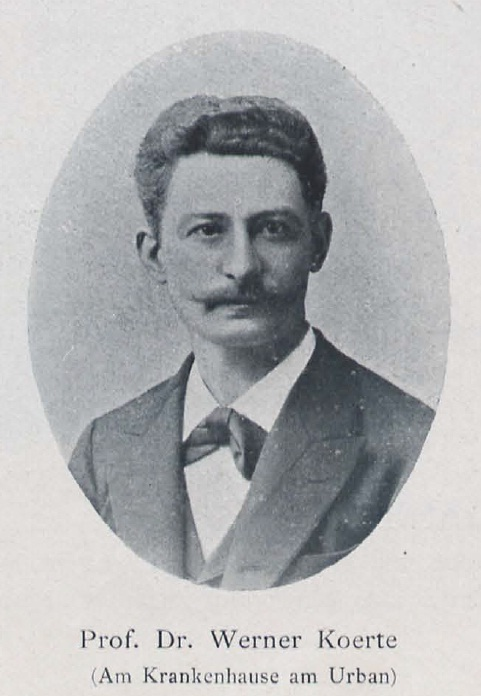
- Born: 21 October 1853; Berlin, Germany
- Died: 3 December 1937 (aged 84)
- Occupation: Surgeon
- Relatives: Gustav Körte (brother); Alfred Körte (brother)

Werner Körte (21 October 1853 – 3 December 1937) was a German surgeon born in Berlin. He was the brother of archaeologist Gustav Körte (1852–1917) and philologist Alfred Körte (1866–1946).

During the Franco-Prussian War, he worked as a volunteer in a Typhuslazarett in Metz, and in 1875 earned his medical doctorate at the University of Strasbourg. From 1877 to 1879, he was an assistant to Robert Ferdinand Wilms (1824-1880) at the Bethanien Hospital in Berlin. When Wilms was incapacitated due to illness, he was provisional head at the hospital. From 1889 to 1924, he was director of the Krankenhaus Urban (Urban Hospital) in Berlin.

As a surgeon, Körte specialized in liver, gall bladder and pancreatic operations. From 1899 until 1929, he served as the first secretary of the German Society of Surgery, later being elected an honorary chairman (1930).

The singer Amalie Joachim died while undergoing a gall bladder operation under his care on 3 February 1899.

== Selected publications ==
- Die Chirurgie der Leber und der Gallenwege, (Surgery of the liver and gall bladder), 1892.
- Beiträge zur Chirurgie der Gallenwege, (Contributions to gall bladder surgery), 1905.
- Handbuch der Praktischen Chirurgie Kapitel zum Peritoneum (Textbook of practical surgery of the peritoneum).
- Die Deutsche Klinik am Eingange des zwanzigsten Jahrhunderts Abschnitt über Mastdarm.
