= Georges Radet =

French historian (1859–1941)

Georges-Albert Radet (1859–1941) was a French epigrapher, archaeologist and historian. He was born in Chesley on 28 November 1859, and died at Saint-Morillon on 9 July 1941.

== Life ==
After studying at the École normale supérieure, Radet passed the agrégation in 1884 and joined the French School of Athens in the same year. Specialising in Asia, he travelled the continent on numerous occasions and in 1892 defended his doctoral thesis titled "La Lydie et le monde grec au temps de Mermnades, 687-546" [Lydia and the Greek world at the time of Mermnades, 687-546].

Between 1888 and 1934, he taught at the Faculty of Letters of the University of Bordeaux, and was dean of the faculty from 1899 to 1919. He was awarded the Prix Kastner-Boursault in 1902. He was a corresponding member of the Academy of Inscriptions and Belles-Lettres in 1904, and elected as a free member on 13 November 1925. He was co-founder of the School of Hispanic Studies and the Casa de Velázquez.

== Publications ==
- La Lydie et le monde grec au temps des Mermnades (687-546) (« Bibliothèque des Écoles françaises d'Athènes et de Rome », 63), Paris, Thorin, 1893.
- L'histoire et l’œuvre de l'École française d'Athènes, Paris, A. Fontemoing, 1901, prix Kastner-Boursault de l’Académie française en 1902
- Notes critiques sur l'histoire d'Alexandre, Bordeaux, Féret & fils, 1925-1927, 86 p. (en ligne [archive]).

== Bibliography ==
- "Mélanges d'études anciennes offerts à Georges Radet, sous la direction de Fernand Chapouthier, William Seston et Pierre Boyancé - Bibliographie", dans Revue des Études Anciennes, 1940, vol. 42, no. 1-4, p. 17-44.
- Marcel Aubert, "Éloge funèbre de M. Georges Radet, académicien libre", Comptes rendus de l'Académie des inscriptions et belles-lettres, vol. 85, no. 4, 1941, pp. 257–262 (ISSN 1969-6663)
- Pierre Roussel, Nécrologie : "La collaboration de Georges Radet au Journal des Savants", Journal des Savants, 1941, no. 3, p. 132-134.
- René Dussaud, "Notice sur la vie et les travaux de M. Georges Radet, membre de l'Académie", Comptes rendus des séances de l'Académie des Inscriptions et Belles-Lettres, 1947, 91e année, no. 4, p. 648-661.
- François Cadilhon, Bernard Lachaise et Jean-Michel Lebigre (préf. Anne-Marie Cocula), Histoire d'une université bordelaise : Michel de Montaigne, faculté des arts, faculté des lettres, 1441-1999, vol. 1, Talence, Presses universitaires de Bordeaux, 1999, 221 p. (ISBN 2-86781-241-0), p. 83.
