= Gustav Körte =

German archaeologist (1852–1917)

- Born: 8 February 1852; Berlin, Germany
- Died: 15 August 1917 (aged 65)
- Occupation: Archaeologist
- Relatives: Alfred Körte (brother); Werner Körte (brother)

Gustav Körte (8 February 1852 – 15 August 1917) was a German classical archaeologist. He was the brother of philologist Alfred Körte (1866–1946) and surgeon Werner Körte (1853–1937).

Körte was born in Berlin. He studied classical philology and archaeology at the University of Göttingen, then continued his education with Heinrich Brunn (1822–1894) at Munich (1871). From 1875, he performed research in Italy and Greece, where he worked was an assistant at the German Archaeological Institute in Athens (1877–79).

In 1881, he became a professor of archaeology at the University of Rostock, and later served as director of the German Archaeological Institute in Rome (1905–07). In 1907, upon the death of Karl Dilthey (1839–1907), Körte was appointed chair of archaeology at Göttingen, a position he held up until his death in 1917.

In 1900, with his brother Alfred, he began the first excavation at Gordion, an ancient Phrygian city in Asia Minor. In 1904, the two brothers published their archaeological findings in a treatise called Gordion: Ergebnisse der Ausgrabung im Jahre 1900. Gustav Körte also conducted significant investigations of the necropoli at Orvieto and Tarquinia.

With Adolf Klügmann (1837–1880), he continued edition of Etruskische Spiegel, a project involving systematic study of Etruscan mirrors that was initiated in 1843 by Eduard Gerhard (1795–1867). He died in Göttingen, aged 65.
