= Jules de Corte =

Dutch singer/songwriter

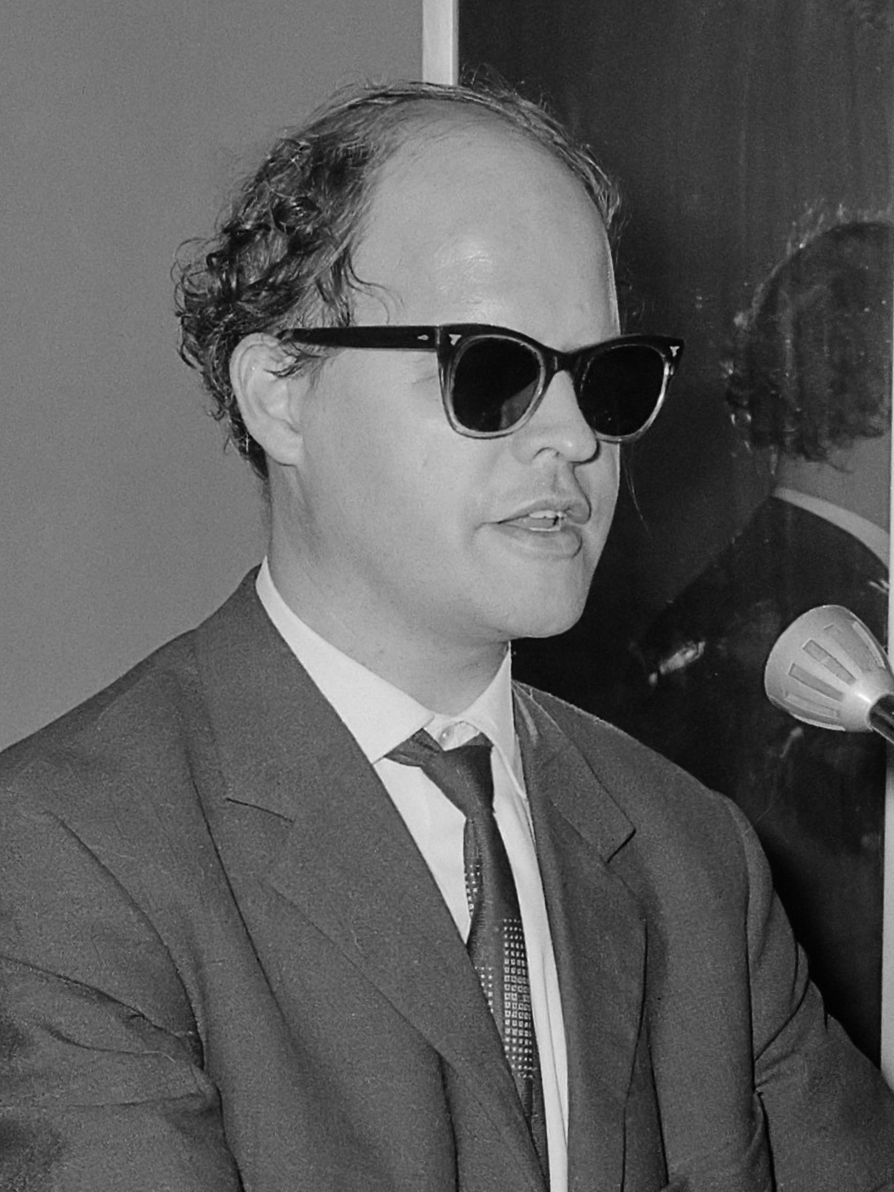
- Jules de Corte in 1964
- Born: Julius de Corte; 29 March 1924; Deurne, Netherlands
- Died: 16 February 1996 (aged 71); Eindhoven, Netherlands
- Education: Blinden-instituut
- Known for: Singer-songwriter, troubadour
- Spouse(s): Mien Verhoeven (1954–1976); Thea Dekker (1976–1996)
- Website: www.julesdecorte.nl

Julius "Jules" de Corte (29 March 1924–16 February 1996) was probably one of the most famous blind singer-songwriters from the Netherlands.

== Early life ==
Julius de Corte was born on 29 March 1924 in Deurne to Peer de Corte and Anna van Eijk. His father had socialist ideals and in 1923 led a strike, the failure of which had a significant impact on the already poor family. At fourteen months, Jules developed a middle ear infection, which eventually led to him becoming blind. He would spend the rest of his childhood in two Catholic institutions for the blind in Grave, which provided him with a good education but no affection. In the last year of the Second World War, allied soldiers were accommodated in the institute and De Corte sang songs for them and played the piano.

== Music career ==
In 1945, De Corte became a professional musician. Initially, he played at dance schools and parties and so on, but soon afterwards he began to make radio and stage appearances. Over the years, he collaborated with many other famous performers, including Louis van Dijk, Albert Mol and Rita Reys.

Although he did other work too, De Corte is best known for his songs, such as Ik zou wel eens willen weten. It is estimated he wrote over 3,000 songs, some poetic and sad, others funny.

De Corte died on 16 February 1996 in Eindhoven.

== Discography ==
Year	Title	Format	Label	Catalogno	Remark
1955	Levensliedjes, Volume I	10-inch LP	RCA	130 104	
1956	Levensliedjes, Volume I: Ik Zou Wel Eens Willen Weten ~ De Vogels / Waar Blijft De Tijd? ~ Het Leven Is ~ Een Beetje Zeer	7-inch EP	RCA	75 155	
1956	Levensliedjes, Volume II: Je Vous Aime ~ Mijnheer N.N. ~ We Lachen Maar / Wij Leven Vrij ~ Illusie	7-inch EP	RCA	75 156	
1956	De Vogels / Wij Leven Vrij	78rpm 10-inch single	RCA	28 139	
1956	Levensliedjes, Volume II	10-inch LP	RCA	130 151	
1956	Jules De Corte Speelt En Bezingt: Het Kleine Mannetje ~ 'n Petit Ça Ça / 't Electrisch Huis ~ Romance	7-inch EP	CID	75 896	
1956	Jules De Corte Speelt En Bezingt: De School ~ De Zwerver / Raadseltjes ~ De Schommel	7-inch EP	CID	75 897	
1957	Jules De Corte Speelt En Bezingt...	10-inch LP	CID	130 180	
1958	Voor U Als Individu	10-inch LP	PHILIPS	P 13085 R	
1959	Voor U Als Individu: Juultje Van Pingelen ~ Naar, Dom Jongetje / De Hopelozen ~ Dromen Zijn Bedrog	7-inch EP	PHILIPS	422 412 PE	
1960	Jules De Corte Speelt En Bezingt...: Die Forelle ~ Wij Nederlanders ~ M'n Dochter Van Twee / De Leerschool Van Het Leven ~ Schoenmakertje ~ Als Jij 't Wilt	7-inch EP	OMEGA	145 551	
1960	Het Sprookje Van De Toto / Business-Men	7-inch single	PHILIPS	318 426 PF	
1960	Liedjes Rond De Kerst: Van Goeden Wille ~ Kleine Jezus, Grote God ~ Onder De Mistletoe / Het Stalletje ~ De Onbekende ~ Kerst-Balans	7-inch EP	PHILIPS	422 490 PE	
1961	De Hopelozen / Het Leven Is	7-inch EP	JEUGD MEETING EXPOHAL	DE 99 291	advert: Youth Meeting in Expohal
1961	Jules De Corte Zingt Een Loflied Op Het Gas	7-inch single	ENERGIEMIJ	106 730 F	commercial: EnergieMij – Gas is en blijft een moderne brandstof
1962	Liedjes Die Eigenlijk Niet Mogen	10-inch LP	PHILIPS	P 600 353 R	
1962	De Corte Kinderliedjes	10-inch LP	DECCA	LQ 60420	Jules De Corte with BlokhutKoor
1962	Liedjes Die Eigenlijk Niet Mogen – 1: Wie in Nederland Wil Zingen ~ Het Bruidspaar ~ De Reuzen Van De Middelmaat / Ad Majorem Dei Gloriam ~ De Super Legaliteit	7-inch EP	PHILIPS	433 146 PE	
1962	Liedjes Die Eigenlijk Niet Mogen – 2: Hoe Genoeglijk Rolt Het Leven ~ Oom Jan ~ De Anarchist / Het Volk Wil Brood En Spelen ~ Het Porseleinen Vogeltje	7-inch EP	PHILIPS	433 147 PE	
1963	Ik Zou Wel Eens Willen Weten	12-inch LP	DURECO	51 001	
1963	Prettige Feestdagen (10 Tracks)	10-inch LP	PHILIPS	P 600 712 R	
1963	Prettige Feestdagen (18 Tracks)	12-inch LP	PHILIPS	P 08089 L	
1963	Liedjes Rond De Kerst	10-inch LP	PHILIPS	P 600 714 R	
1964	Liedjes Rond De Kerst, No 2: De Arme Herder Joachim ~ De Vrede ~ Wintervogel / Kerstmis Met Jingle Bells ~ O, Groene Boom ~ Tussen Kerst En Oudjaarsavond	7-inch EP	PHILIPS	433 204 PE	
1964	Ik Zou Wel Eens Willen Weten / Als Jij 't Wilt	7-inch single	OMEGA	35 415	
1964	De Vogels / Wij Nederlanders	7-inch single	OMEGA	35 416	
1964	Die Forelle / De Enkeling	7-inch single	OMEGA	35 417	
1964	De Enkeling	12-inch LP	DURECO	51 025	
1964	Prettige Feestdagen: De Lollige Broek ~ Het Feest Dat Nooit Gevierd Werd ~ Verjaardag / De Vrije Zaterdag ~ Koninginnedag ~ Vreugde Der Wet	7-inch EP	PHILIPS	433 228 PE	
1965	Mensen, Dieren, Dingen: De Pad ~ Orgeltje ~ Feest In Muizenland / Spinnetje ~ Vogel Toen Het Lente Was ~ Jan De Muzikant	7-inch EP	PHILIPS	433 309 PE	
1965	Het Feest Dat Nooit Gevierd Werd / De Vrije Zaterdag	7-inch single	PHILIPS	JF 327 812	
1965	Jules De Corte Zingt Voor Een Gouden Bartiméus: Tomtariëte Tomtapie / De Krekel En De Mier	7-inch single	BARTIMÉUS	110 539 F	On the occasion of 50 years of Institute Bartiméus
1965	Het Sprookje Van De Wonderman / Morgen Is Er Weer Een Dag	7-inch single	ÉÉN FRANK CLUB	111 345 F	advert: Één frank Club
1966	Jules De Corte Zingt: Er Was Er 's... ~ Heb Medelijden Met De Schare / Rose ~ Regientje	7-inch EP	ROTARY APELDOORN Z	110 686 E	charteruitreiking Rotary Apeldoorn-zuid 15 January 1966
1966	De Lollige Broek / Verjaardag	7-inch single	PHILIPS	JF 327 995	
1966	De Corte Kinderliedjes: Daar Waren Eens Twee Honden ~ Het Ezeltje / Bij Mijn Oom ~ De Kindertjes Van De Apen	7-inch EP	DECCA	BT 60006	Jules De Corte with BlokhutKoor
1966	De Corte Kinderliedjes 2: Meneer Van Zwaai En Zijn Papegaai ~ Kaboutertje Woutertje / Het Poppenhuis Van Annemiek ~ De Voddenman	7-inch EP	DECCA	BT 60008	Jules De Corte with BlokhutKoor
1966	De Corte Kinderliedjes (+ 4 bonus tracks)	12-inch LP	DECCA	625 361 QL	Jules De Corte with BlokhutKoor
1966	Serenades: Carlijntje ~ Beatrice ~ Mariska / Als De Zwarte Merel Fluit ~ Goudfazant ~ Zo Fluit De Vogel Naar Zijn Lief	7-inch EP	PHILIPS	433 331 PE	
1966	Spaarbeleg Presenteert: Spaarbeleg ~ Al Wat Leeft En Groeit / Hoort Vriendinnen En Vrienden ~ De Geldboom	7-inch EP	SPAARBELEG	110 830 E	commercial: Spaarbeleg
1966	Liedjes Die Eigenlijk Best Mogen	12-inch LP	PHILIPS	625 824 QL	
1967	Johan En Margreetje / Jan Willem Janszoon Berkermaat	7-inch single	PHILIPS	JF 333 862	
1968	De Poort / Geachte Kerk	7-inch single	RELAX	45 098	
1969	Jules De Corte	12-inch LP	IMPERIAL	5C 054 24158	
1971	Voor Wie Luisteren Wil	12-inch LP	IMPERIAL	5C 054 24345	
1971	Brussel / Twee Olijke Vrolijke Jagers	7-inch single	IMPERIAL	5C 006 24410	
1971	Hallo, Koning Onbenul / Tango Van Addis Abeba	7-inch single	IMPERIAL	5C 006 24433	
1971	Twaalf Veelgevraagde Liedjes Van Jules De Corte	MC	PHILIPS	7174 035	
1974	Met Vriendelijke Groeten	12-inch LP	IMPERIAL	5C 050 24973	
1974	Ik Zou Wel Eens Willen Weten...	12-inch LP	ELF PROVINCIËN	ELF 75 28 G	
1974	Ik Zou Wel Eens Willen Weten	2×12″ LPs	ELF PROVINCIËN	ELF 46 01/02	
1974	Miniaturen	12-inch LP	CBS	65980	
1974	Ik Zou Wel Eens Willen Weten / Als Je Overmorgen Oud Bent	7-inch single	CBS	2812	
1974	Ik Zou Wel Eens Willen Weten / De Vogels	7-inch single	ELF PROVINCIËN	ELF 69 28	
1975	Het Land Van De Toekomst / Beatrice	7-inch single	CBS	3828	
1975	Verhaaltjes En Liedjes Gezegd, Gezongen En Gespeeld Door Jules De Corte Ter Gelegenheid Van Het Afscheid Van S. Bouma Op 5 Februari 1975: Leven Is Een Spel ~ Een Naam / We Weten Niet Waar We Zoeken Moeten ~ Problemen ~ Gregor	7-inch EP	WOLTERS NOORDHOFF	RCS 334	On the occasion of retirement of S. Bouma on 5 February 1975
1976	Bij Leven En Welzijn	12-inch LP	EMI	5C 064 25463	
1977	Cabaret – Vandaag Gisteren Morgen 17 – Jules De Corte	12-inch LP	PHILIPS	9286 803	
1980	Telefooncirkellied / Leugens	7-inch single	RODE KRUIS	VR 10613	On the occasion of 5 years of Dutch Red Cross telephone circle – nov. 1980
1983	Liedjes Van Jules De Corte: Het Wiel ~ De Voerman ~ De Taxischauffeur	7-inch EP	KNVTO		
1985	Lieder Ohne Worte Van Jules De Corte – Prix Amical 1945–1985	12-inch LP	MIRASOUND MUSICA	KS 20 7067	
1985	Profeet in Eigen Land	3 MCs	KRO CABARET	–	
1990	Ingelijst	CD	RED BULLET	RB 66 30	
1990	Ik Zou Wel Eens Willen Weten (- 7 malus tracks)	CD	DURECO	1151942	
1990	Het Beste Van Jules De Corte	CD	EMI	794 943 2	
1996	Voor De Lui Daar Tussen In – Zijn 30 Mooiste Liedjes	CD	MERCURY	528 763 2	
2005	Over The Rainbow	CD	MUNICH	BMCD 471	
2008	Jules De Corte	CD	CNR MUSIC	22 225462	
2011	Ons Nederlandje - Onbekende Luisterliedjes – Nostalgisch En Actueel	2 CD's	FONOS	8718481479995	

== Prizes ==
De Corte received the following prizes:

- Edison Award (1962), for the album Liedjes die eigenlijk niet mogen
- Visser-Neerlandia Prize (1967), for his complete works
- Golden Harp (1969)
- Louis Davids Prize (1975), for the song Het land van de toekomst
