= Robin Korte =

German politician (born 1988)

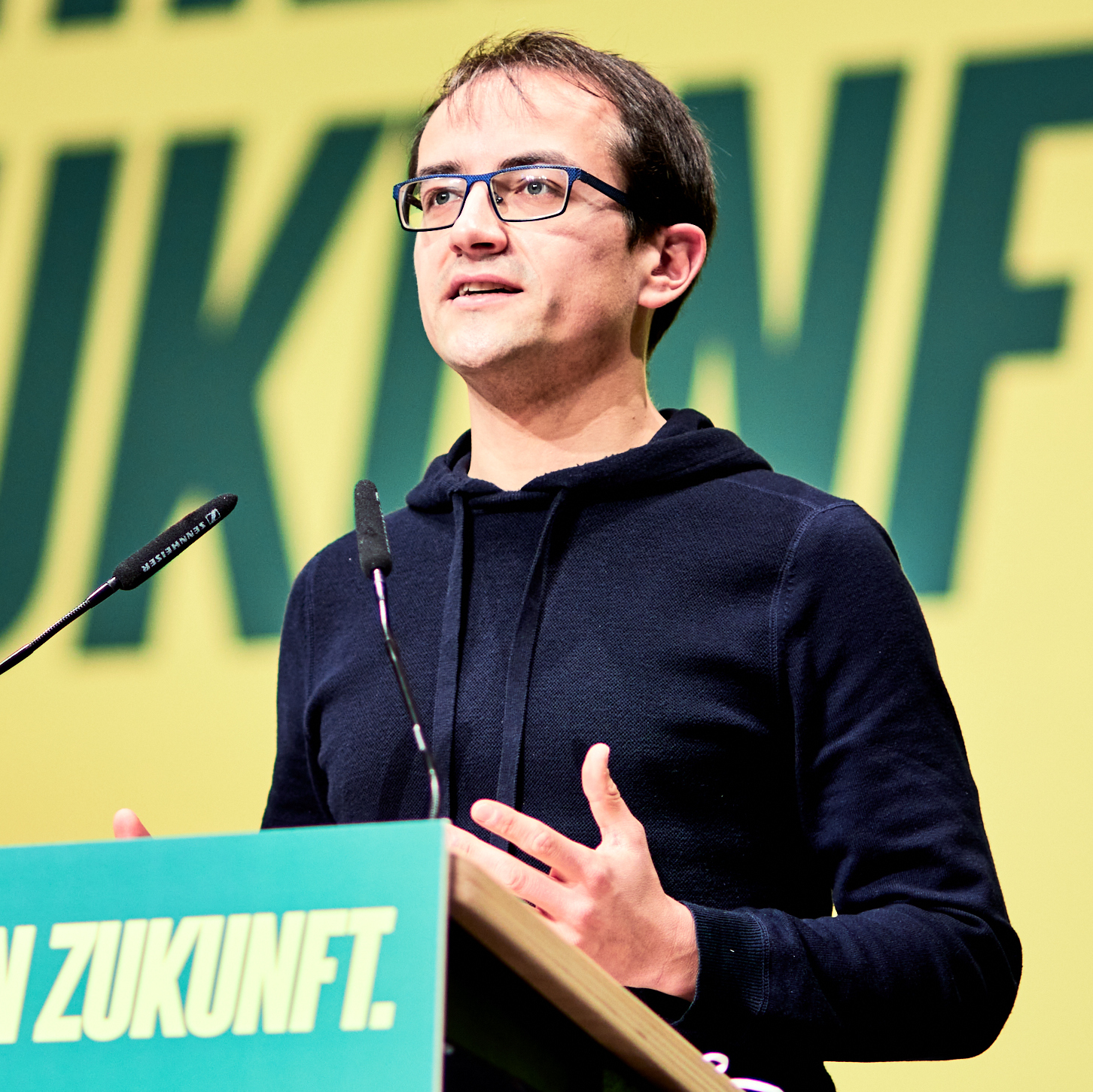
- Korte in 2022

Member of the Landtag of North Rhine-Westphalia
- Incumbent
- Assumed office 1 June 2022
- Preceded by: Stefan Nacke
- Constituency: Münster II

Personal details
- Born: 1988 (age 37–38) Langenhagen
- Party: Alliance 90/The Greens (since 2012)

Robin Udo Korte (born 1988 in Langenhagen) is a German politician serving as a member of the Landtag of North Rhine-Westphalia since 2022. He has served as chairman of the Committee on Economic Affairs, Industry, Climate Protection and Energy since 2022.
