= Robtel Neajai Pailey =

Liberian academic, activist and author

- Born: Monrovia, Liberia

Academic background
- Education: School of Oriental and African Studies
- Thesis: The Love of Liberty Divided Us Here? Factors Leading to the Introduction and Postponement in Passage of Liberia’s Dual Citizenship Bill

Robtel Neajai Pailey is a Liberian scholar, author, and activist. After studying at Howard University, the University of Oxford and SOAS, University of London, she started teaching at the London School of Economics (LSE).

As part of her scholarly and literary publications, she is interested in various phenomena affecting countries in the Global South, including Liberia, and introduces a critique of the 'white gaze of development', a term she coined to challenge the racist underpinnings of mainstream development. For her, it is necessary to decolonize development, both in the Global South and North.

== Biography ==
Robtel Neajai Pailey was born in Monrovia, Liberia. She began her studies at Howard University in 2000, followed by the University of Oxford in 2006, where she received full scholarships to study at both institutions. She then studied at the School of Oriental and African Studies (SOAS), a branch of the University of London. There, she defended her PhD thesis titled The Love of Liberty Divided Us Here? Factors Leading to the Introduction and Postponement in Passage of Liberia's Dual Citizenship Bill in 2014. While still preparing her thesis, she was already involved in the fight against poverty and corruption. During this time, she wrote articles for several international newspapers, such as Al Jazeera English, The New York Times, Africa Today and The Guardian. In these articles, she highlighted the persistent colonial ties between Liberia and the United States.

In 2013, she published the children's book Gbagba, which depicts the journey of Liberian twin characters and address corruption and integrity as opposite phenomena. Pailey later became an assistant professor at the London School of Economics (LSE).

== Analysis ==
Her scholarly contributions focus particularly on colonial and post-colonial issues. She tackles 'white gaze of development' dynamics in struggles against poverty and inequality affecting countries that have experienced colonialism. The researcher also aims to demonstrate that in many development institutions, decision-making often privileges whiteness and Western forms of modernity.

Furthermore, she critiques emphasis on the evolution of countries based on a productivist approach to economic development.
