= Theodora Korte =

German poet, journalist and author

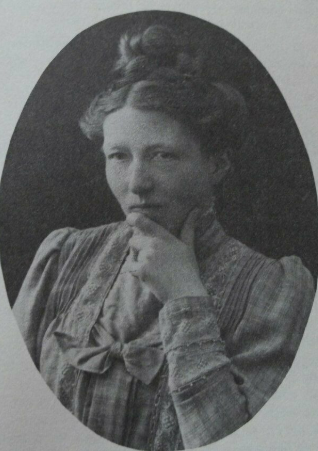
- Born: November 12, 1872; Nienhaus, Aschendorf, Province of Hanover, German Empire
- Died: August 31, 1926 (aged 53); Münster, Weimar Republic
- Occupations: Writer; Journalist
- Writing career
- Pen name: Theo von Nienhaus
- Years active: 1915-1926
- Notable works: Jan Bernd Hoeftmann, the Story of an Emsland Boy (1919); Stories from Emsland (1926)

Theodora Johanna Antonia Maria Korte (12 November 1872 in Aschendorf – 31 August 1926 in Münster) was a German poet, journalist and author, often writing under the pseudonym Theo von Nienhaus.

== Early life and education ==
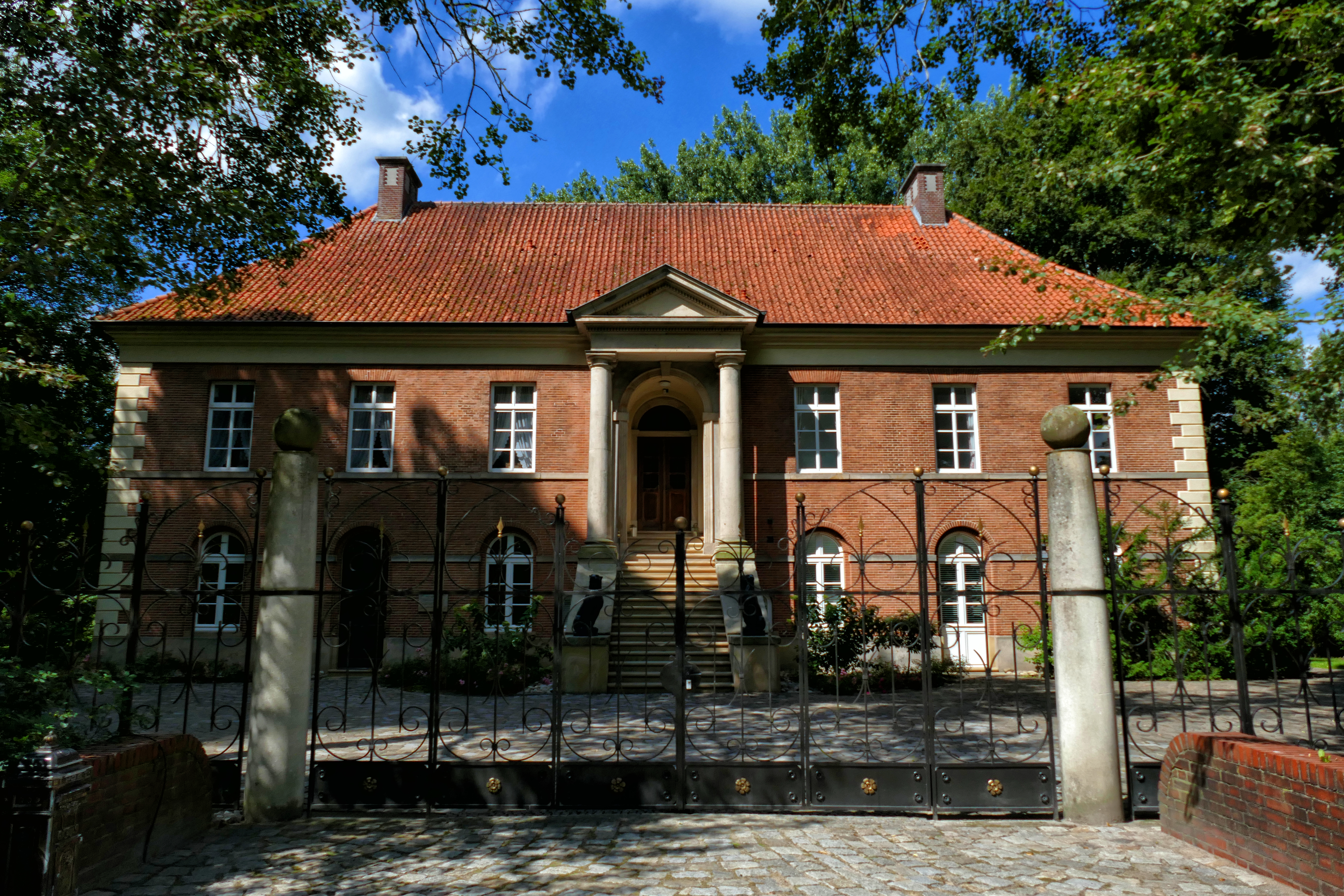
Nienhaus, where Theodora grew up

Theodora Korte was born as a member of the Hanoverian Korte family. Her parents were Johann-Heinrich Korte (1818-1907) and Maria Rodewyk (1836-1914), daughter of a tobacco merchant. Johann-Heinrich Korte was governor 'Amtshauptmann' of Emsland. He held this title after Hanover was annexed by the Kingdom of Prussia in 1866. This way, Johann-Heinrich Korte profited from the Prussian invasion, while many of his relatives were forced to flee the country and move abroad.

Korte grew up in the Amtshaus Nienhaus with her two older brothers; Valentin (1858), and Heinrich (1865); and three older sisters; Sophia (1859), Rosalia (1860), and Elisabeth (1861). From her father's first marriage she had two half-brothers; Gustav (1852) and Johann (1854). Hanover had become a province of the German Empire only a year before Theodora's birth, making her the only member of her immediate family without the Hanoverian nationality, but with the new German one.

Aged 14, Korte moved to Bregenz, Austria, and attended the Catholic Sacré Coeur Riedenburg convent school. Afterwards, she attended a finishing school in Emden, and earned her teaching certificate.

== Career ==
Shortly after the start of the First World War, Korte moved to Münster, where she began to write for Catholic newspapers and magazines. Her works were known for their religious themes and the clear love their author had for Emsland, her home region. This is most apparent in her most famous works: Jan Bernd Hoeftmann, the Story of an Emsland Boy (1919).

== Personal life ==
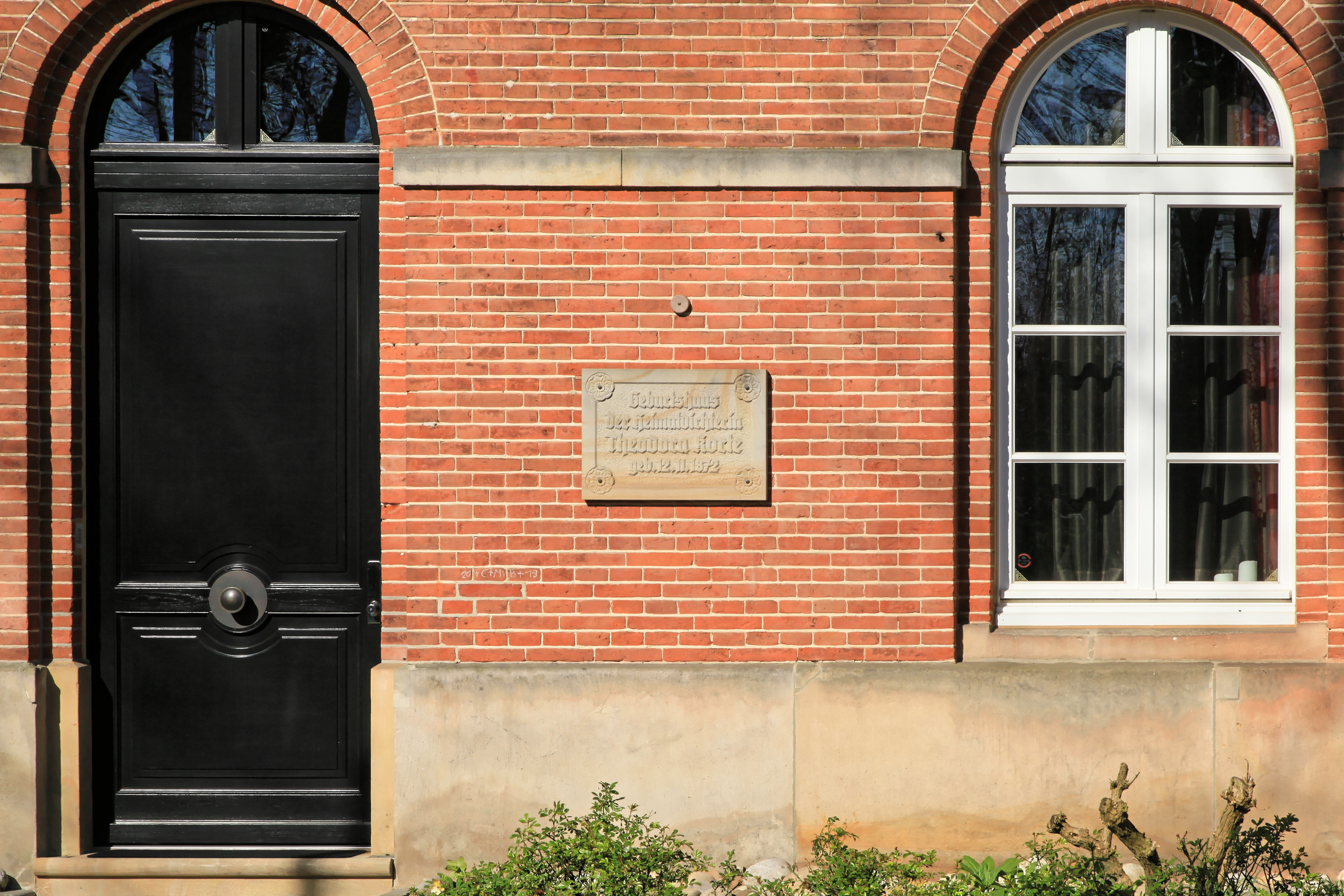
Memorial plaque for Theodora Korte, Nienhaus

After her time in Emden, Korte travelled to Paris, but quickly returned when her parents became ill. As their only unwed daughter, it was her responsibility to take care of her ailing parents, which she did until her father's death in 1907, and her mother's in 1914.

Korte's career was successful, but cut short. On 31 August 1926 she died, aged 53, at the Clemens Hospital in Münster, where she was also buried. There is still a plaque on the façade of the Nienhaus commemorating her birth.

== Works ==
- Trude Friedwald (Münster, 1908)
- Helen Keller, stories for children by Th. Korte (Limburg, 1910)
- Contemporary Poems (Papenburg, 1915)
- Up, up, to battle, a war story for communion children (Dülmen, 1916)
- Jan Bernd Hoeftmann, the Story of an Emsland Boy (Keulen, 1919)
- Bells Ringing, a story for communion children (Einsiedeln, 1922)
- Battles and Victories, stories for communion children (Einsiedeln, 1923)
- The Sisters (Elberfeld, 1925)
- Stories from Emsland: Healing Springs, the Ferryman on the Eems, Dark Waves, Wilm Leffers' Return Home (Elberfeld, 1926)

== Bibliography ==
- German Biographical Archives NF Microfiche nr. 746, p. 136.
- Henning Buck, Literatuur. In: Werner Franke/Josef Grave/Heiner Schüpp/Gerd Steinwascher (red.): The District Emsland. Geography, History, Present. A District Description. Published on behalf of the district Emsland, Meppen 2002, pp. 492-497, pp. 495-496.
- Elisabeth Friedrichs:The German female authors of the 19th and 20th centuries: a lexicon. (= Repertoire of German literary history, part 9), Stuttgart 1981, p. 167.
- Aiga Klotz: Children's literature in Germany 1840-1950. Full list of publications in German, part 2 (= Repertoire of German literary history, part 12), Stuttgart 1992, p. 497.
- Wilhelm Kosch: Katholiek Duitsland. Biografisch-Bibliografisch Lexicon, deel 2, Augsburg, z.d. (1937), p. 2295.
- Kürschners Duitse literatuurkalender voor het jaar 1926 , 43th year, Berlijn/Leipzig 1926, kol. 528.
- Alois Ovelgönne/Marianne Wulf/HW Zöller (red.): Theodora Korte – De plaatselijke dichter uit Aschendorf. Aschendorf 1982.
- Alois Ovelgönne/Johannes Rüschen: Korte, Theodora Johanna Antonia. In: Studievereniging voor regionale geschiedenis van Emsland (red.), Geschiedenis van Emsland, Vol. 12, Haselünne 2005, pp. 340-349 (with detailed catalogue).
- Karl Pardey: Korte, Theodora. In: Rainer Hehemann (red.): Biographical handbook about the history of the region Osnabrück. Published by the regional association of Osnabrück, Bramsche 1990, p. 171.
- Johannes Rüschen: Theodora Korte – Aschendorfs great poet (1872-1926). In: Johannes Rüschen (red.): Famous Ermslanders from yesteryear. Bremen 1988, blz. 138–143.
- Westphalian Author Encyclopedia 1850 until 1900. Part 3. In opdracht van de Regionale Vereniging Westfalen-Lippe, uitgegeven en geredigeerd door Walter Gödden en Iris Nölle-Hornkamp, Paderborn 1997, pp. 391–393.
