= The Bush Chicken =

Liberian online newspaper

- Type: Online Media Outlet
- Format: Website
- Owner(s): Common Sense Solutions, Inc.
- Editor: Jefferson Gblnzuh Krua, Alex Busingye
- Founded: 31 January 2015; 11 years ago
- Headquarters: 19th Street, Sinkor, Monrovia, Liberia
- Website: www.bushchicken.com

The Bush Chicken is an online Liberian newspaper that was founded to ensure more inclusive coverage of rural communities and to promote high quality and ethical journalism.

Founded in 2014 and launched on January 31, 2015, the outlet is published by Common Sense Solutions, Inc., which is co-owned by Jefferson Krua, Torli Krua, Francis Cordor, Alex Busingye, and Marius Bah.

From 2017 to 2019, The Bush Chicken won the most excellence awards given out by the Press Union of Liberia - more than any Liberian newspaper.

== History ==
The Bush Chicken was founded by Jefferson Krua, a civil engineer by training who spent the majority of his life in the U.S. after fleeing Liberia's civil war at the age of five. Although Krua initially ran the news outlet from the U.S., he later moved to Liberia to oversee its growth, recruiting reporters in most of Liberia's 15 counties.
