= Benji Cavalli =

Liberian singer and songwriter

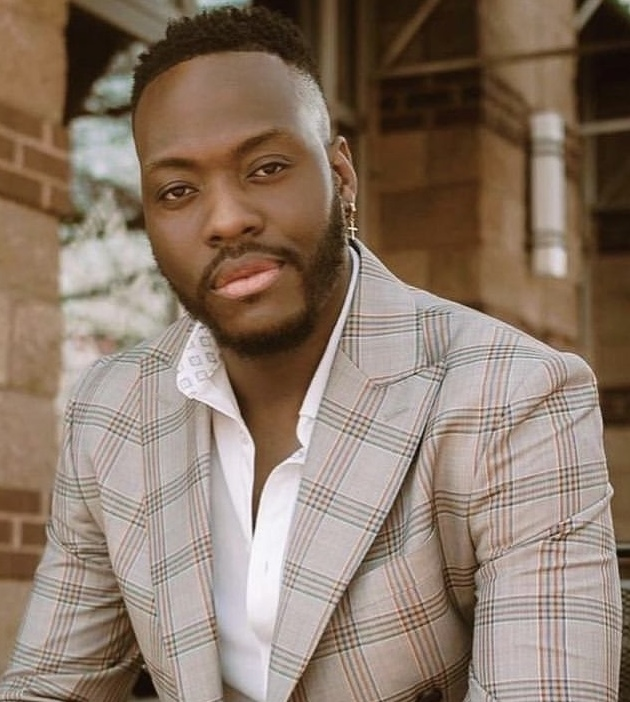

Background information
- Born: Benjamin Kai; April 17; Monrovia, Liberia
- Genres: Afrobeats; highlife; Gbema
- Occupations: Singer; songwriter; instrumentalist; dancer
- Instrument: Vocals
- Years active: 2008–present
- Formerly of: La Jet Fami

Benjamin Kai (born April 17), who is better known as Benji Cavalli, is a Liberian singer, songwriter, instrumentalist, and dancer from Monrovia. He started singing and dancing at the age of 9, and relocated to the New York City borough of Staten Island during the First Liberian Civil War. Between 2008 and 2010, he had a brief stint with La Jet Fami, a Philadelphia-based Coupé-décalé band. He embarked on a solo career after the group disbanded and released his debut extended play, My Time, in 2011. His debut studio album, The Bridge, was released on July 18, 2022.

== Early life and music career ==
Benjamin Kai was born on April 17, in Monrovia, Liberia. The eldest child of six, he started singing and dancing when he was 9 years old. He is the nephew of Zack Roberts, one of Liberia's well-known musicians and the lead singer of the 1980's band Zack & Geebah. In 1996, Cavalli and his family fled to Ivory Coast during the First Liberian Civil War. His father was killed prior to him and his family relocating to Ivory Coast. A year later, he and his family relocated to the Park Hill area of Clifton, Staten Island.

In 2008, Cavalli became a member of La Jet Fami, a Philadelphia-based Coupé-décalé band. He embarked on a solo career following the group's disbandment in 2010, and released his debut extended play, My Time, in 2011. In 2015, Cavalli released the single "Slow It Down", which was the first song Just Prince produced for him. It was nominated for New Age Gbema Song of the Year at the 2016 Liberia Music Awards. The song's music video won Best Music Video at the 2016 Liberian Entertainment Awards and was nominated for Video of the Year at the 2016 Liberia Music Awards. Between 2015 and 2021, Cavalli released a number of singles produced by Just Prince, including "One More Night", "Lazy", and "Spoil Myself". In December 2017, he performed at the Liberian Golden Awards in Australia and won the King of the Stage award.

Cavalli's debut studio album, The Bridge, was released on July 18, 2022. It blends Afrobeats with Gbema, a traditional Liberian sound. The album's lyrical content explores themes of peace, love, celebration, and happiness. Cavalli toured eight U.S cities in support of the album, and has collaborated with Liberian artists such as Eric Geso, D12, and Tamba Hali.

== Artistry ==
Cavalli's music is a mixture of Afrobeats, highlife and Gbema. From a production standpoint, his music relies heavily on instruments such as bass, drums, congas and horns. He works closely with his frequent collaborator, Just Prince, to write songs from scratch and share creative ideas.

== Discography ==
Albums

- My Time (EP) (2011)
- The Bridge (2022)

Singles

Year	Title	Album	Ref
2012	"My Number One"	My Time	
2012	"Come Together"	My Time	
2012	"Cherish You" (featuring BabyEye)	Non-album single	
2013	"Addicted To You"	My Time	
2015	"Slow It Down"	Non-album single	
2015	"New Tin"	The Bridge	
2016	"One More Night"	The Bridge	
2017	"Jolly Jolly" (featuring Eric Geso)	The Bridge	
2017	"Enjoy It" (featuring D12)	Non-album single	
2018	"Liberian Girl"	Non-album single	
2018	"Feeling Ley Pekin"	Non-album single	
2019	"Lazy"	The Bridge	
2019	"Borku"	Non-album single	
2020	"Bad"	Non-album single	
2021	"Spoil Myself"	The Bridge	
2022	"Ball"	The Bridge	

== Awards and nominations ==
Year	Event	Prize	Recipient	Result	Ref
2016	Liberia Music Awards	New Age Gbema Artist of the Year	Himself	Nominated	
2016	Liberia Music Awards	New Age Gbema Song of the Year	"Slow It Down"	Nominated	
2016	Liberia Music Awards	Video of the Year	"Slow It Down"	Nominated	
2016	Liberian Entertainment Awards	Best Music Video	"Slow It Down"	Won	
2017	Liberian Golden Awards	King of the Stage	Himself	Won	
2017	Liberia Music Awards	New Age Gbema Artist of the Year	Himself	Nominated	
2017	Liberia Music Awards	Gbema Song of the Year	"One More Night"	Nominated	
2017	Liberia Music Awards	Gbema Song of the Year	"Jolly Jolly" (featuring Eric Geso)	Nominated	
2020	Liberian Entertainment Awards	Best Music Video	"Lazy"	Nominated	

== See also ==
- List of Liberian musicians
