= National Ballet =

National Ballet may refer to:

- National Ballet of Washington, D.C.
- Chilean National Ballet
- Cuban National Ballet
- Dutch National Ballet
- English National Ballet
- Finnish National Ballet
- Georgian National Ballet
- Hungarian National Ballet
- Iranian National Ballet Company
- Korea National Ballet
- National Ballet of Canada
- National Ballet of China
- National Ballet of Portugal
- National Ballet of Rwanda
- National Ballet Theater of Puerto Rico
- National Ballet of Ukraine
