= Clifton, Staten Island =

Neighborhood in New York City

Coordinates: 40.620°N 74.078°W

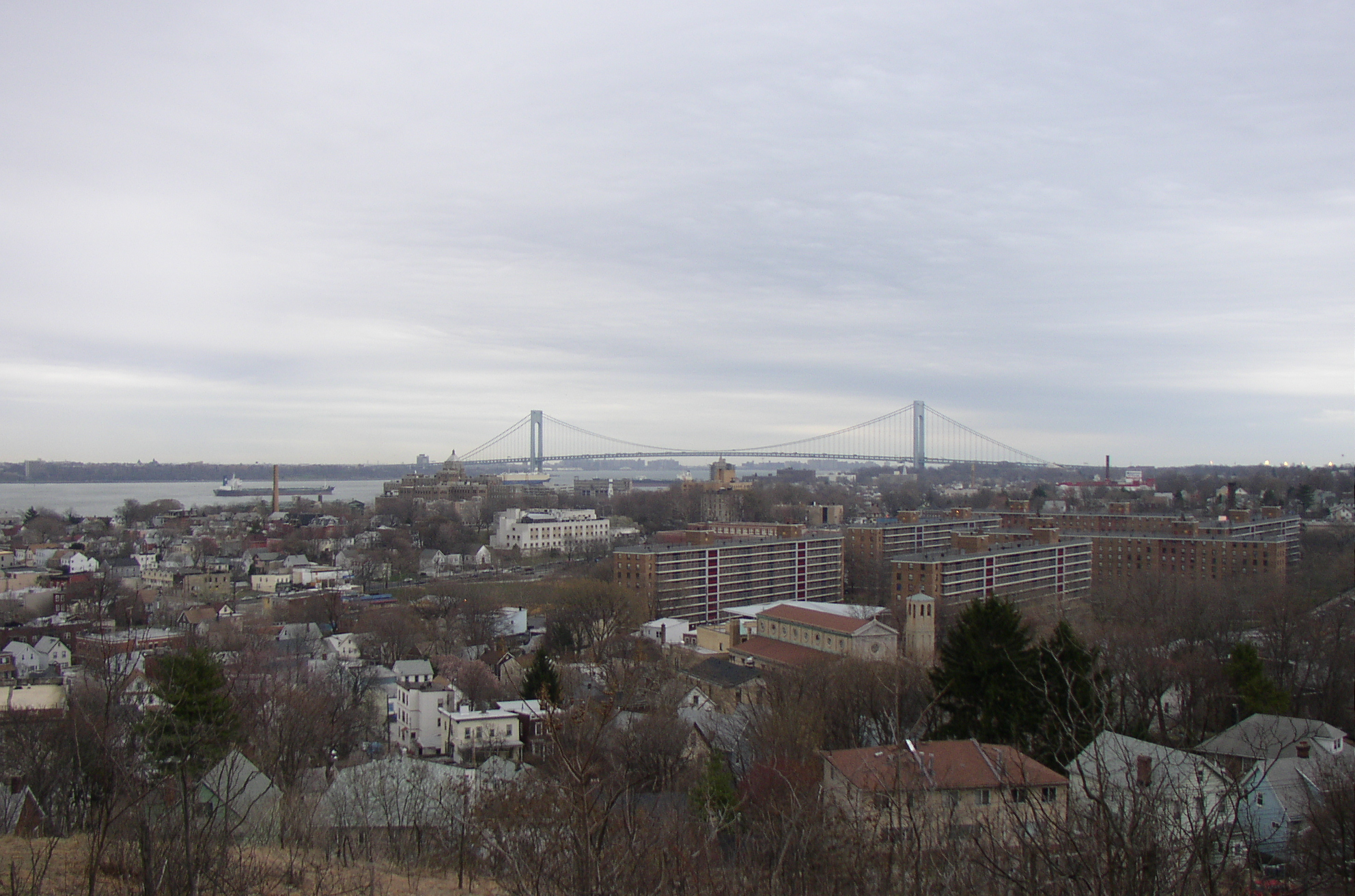
A view over Clifton with Verrazzano–Narrows Bridge in the background.

Location in New York City

Clifton is a neighborhood on the North Shore of Staten Island in New York City, United States. It is an older waterfront neighborhood, facing Upper New York Bay on the east. It is bordered on the north by Stapleton, on the south by Rosebank, on the southwest by Concord, and on the west by Van Duzer Street.

== History ==
The name "Clifton" for the area dates to 1817, when a town by the name, larger in area than the present neighborhood, was laid out along the waterfront. In its early history, much of the surrounding land was owned by the Vanderbilt family. As a young man, Cornelius Vanderbilt established ferry service from the waterfront to Manhattan at the foot of present Vanderbilt Avenue. Bayley Seton Hospital, north of Vanderbilt Avenue, was formerly the United States Public Health Service Hospital and housed the original headquarters of the National Institutes of Health (now located in Bethesda, Maryland).

In the 1840s, the Townsend family built a huge home that had turrets so it was called the Townsend Castle. It was located at what is now Townsend Avenue and Tompkins Avenue. In the 1870s, many roads and large homes were built near the water. The area has many Victorian houses left from the late 1800s in the area from Vanderbilt to Greenfield Avenues.

In the 1880s, much of Staten Island was still very rural. Adjacent to the "village of Clifton," for example, was "a low range of grass hills" on which were pastured 438 goats by a Frenchman named Paul Chaulmier who provided goat's milk to wealthy New Yorkers.

In 1900, the Fox Hills Golf Club encompassed the entire area of where the Park Hill Apartments are now. There was a big clubhouse on Vanderbilt Avenue. Many tournaments were held there until 1935, when it closed. The land was taken over by the government and used for military barracks during World War II. By the 1950s, it evolved into a middle-class, multi-ethnic community of civil employees including firemen, teachers, and doctors.

The Park Hill Apartments, located on Vanderbilt Avenue and on Park Hill Avenue, were initially developed in the 1960s as a private apartment complex to which many people from the other boroughs of NYC moved after the opening of the Verrazzano–Narrows Bridge. By the late 1960s, however, people realized that it was relatively inexpensive to move to Staten Island and purchase a home or rent an apartment in smaller buildings, which resulted in a loss of the emerging middle-class population it initially attracted. Park Hill remained privately owned but became federally subsidized low-income housing complex, and became the site of steadily increasing crime and drug abuse beginning in the early-1970s.

By the late 1980s, it had gained the nickname of "Crack Hill" due to the many arrests for possession and/or sale of crack cocaine that were taking place in and around the development and the adjacent Fox Hills Apartments to the south. Crime in this area has dramatically decreased since the late 1990s. Community activists are addressing the ongoing conflict between Liberian and African-American youth, primarily between the ages of 10–14. The community organizations run after-school programs to help keep the youth occupied in a productive way. This helps curb gang and street violence. The community tension that occurs in Park Hill is based on poverty and unemployment.

In the 1990s, the neighborhood became the center for an immigrant community from Liberia and West Africa around Targee Street. The residences in the neighborhood are mostly one-family houses, but the last decade has seen the development of many attached homes and duplexes.

== Community ==
=== Demographics ===
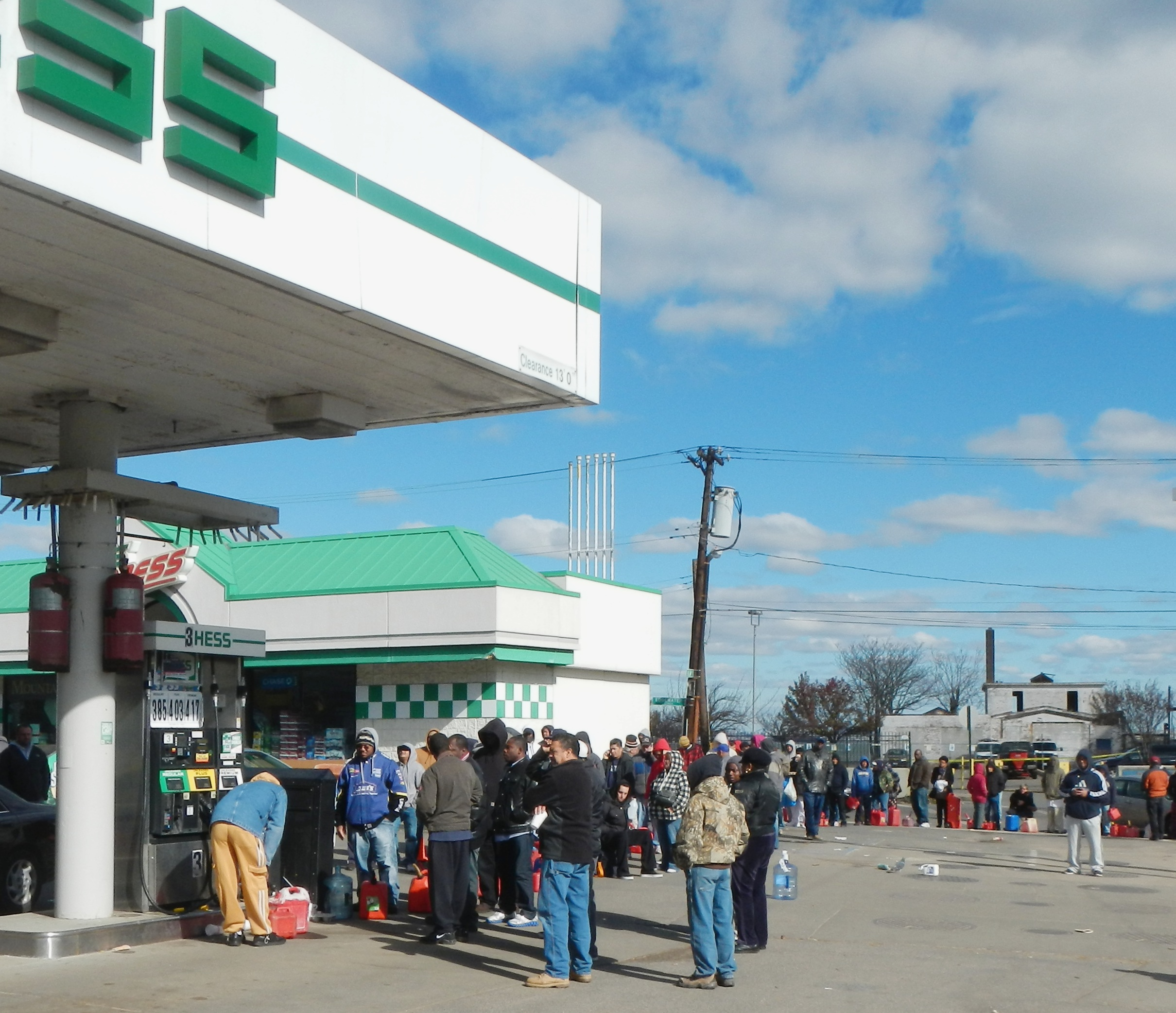
Clifton residents wait to fill fuel cans after Hurricane Sandy.

For census purposes, the New York City Department of City Planning classifies Tompkinsville as part of a larger Neighborhood Tabulation Area called Tompkinsville-Stapleton-Clifton-Fox Hills SI0102. This designated neighborhood had 19,027 inhabitants based on data from the 2020 United States Census. This was an increase of 2,835 persons (17.5%) from the 16,192 counted in 2010. The neighborhood had a population density of 34.2 inhabitants per acre (14,500/sq mi; 5,600/km^{2}).

The racial makeup of the neighborhood was 15.8% (3,006) White (Non-Hispanic), 31.7% (6,031) Black (Non-Hispanic), 9.6% (1,828) Asian, and 4.2% (799) from two or more races. Hispanic or Latino of any race were 38.7% (7,363) of the population.

According to the 2020 United States Census, this area has many cultural communities of over 1,000 inhabitants. This include residents who identify as Mexican, Puerto Rican, African-American, and Chinese.

The largest age group was people 10–34 years old, which made up 37% of the residents. 65.0% of the households had at least one family present. Out of the 13,141 households, 30.5% had a married couple (14.0% with a child under 18), 6.7% had a cohabiting couple (3.1% with a child under 18), 24.8% had a single male (2.4% with a child under 18), and 38.0% had a single female (12.0% with a child under 18). 37.7% of households had children under 18. In this neighborhood, 71.2% of non-vacant housing units are renter-occupied.

The entirety of Community District 1, which comprises Tompkinsville and other neighborhoods on the North Shore, had 181,484 inhabitants as of NYC Health's 2018 Community Health Profile, with an average life expectancy of 79.0 years. This is lower than the median life expectancy of 81.2 for all New York City neighborhoods. Most inhabitants are youth and middle-aged adults: 24% are between the ages of between 0–17, 27% between 25 and 44, and 26% between 45 and 64. The ratio of college-aged and elderly residents was lower, at 10% and 13% respectively.

As of 2017, the median household income in Community District 1 was $48,018. In 2018, an estimated 21% of Tompkinsville and the North Shore residents lived in poverty, compared to 17% in all of Staten Island and 20% in all of New York City. One in fourteen residents (7%) were unemployed, compared to 6% in Staten Island and 9% in New York City. Rent burden, or the percentage of residents who have difficulty paying their rent, is 51% in Tompkinsville and the North Shore, compared to the boroughwide and citywide rates of 49% and 51% respectively. Based on this calculation, as of 2018, Stapleton and the North Shore are considered high-income relative to the rest of the city and not gentrifying.

Over the years 2000–2003, Clifton's unemployment rate increased by 3.2 percentage points, and average wages declined by 8.7 percent, the only Staten Island zip code that experienced a decline. Hundreds of local jobs in the health care and social assistance fields were lost in the downsizing of Bayley Seton Hospital, which had been a major employer of neighborhood residents.

The bulk of the Park Hill neighborhood was built in the 1960s in keeping with New York City's plan for urban renewal projects. It consists of 15 acres (61,000 m^{2}) of 6-story brick apartment buildings. The individual apartments contained within are quite large, with many having 2 or three bedrooms. As ownership has passed into private hands, upkeep on the apartments has dwindled, leaving many of them in a state of disrepair.

The average price of a private house in Park Hill increased from 2002 ($159,254) to 2007 ($321,426). The Clifton neighborhood consists mostly of one-family houses; however, in the past decade many duplexes and attached houses have been developed on property previously zoned for commercial use.

=== Liberian community ===
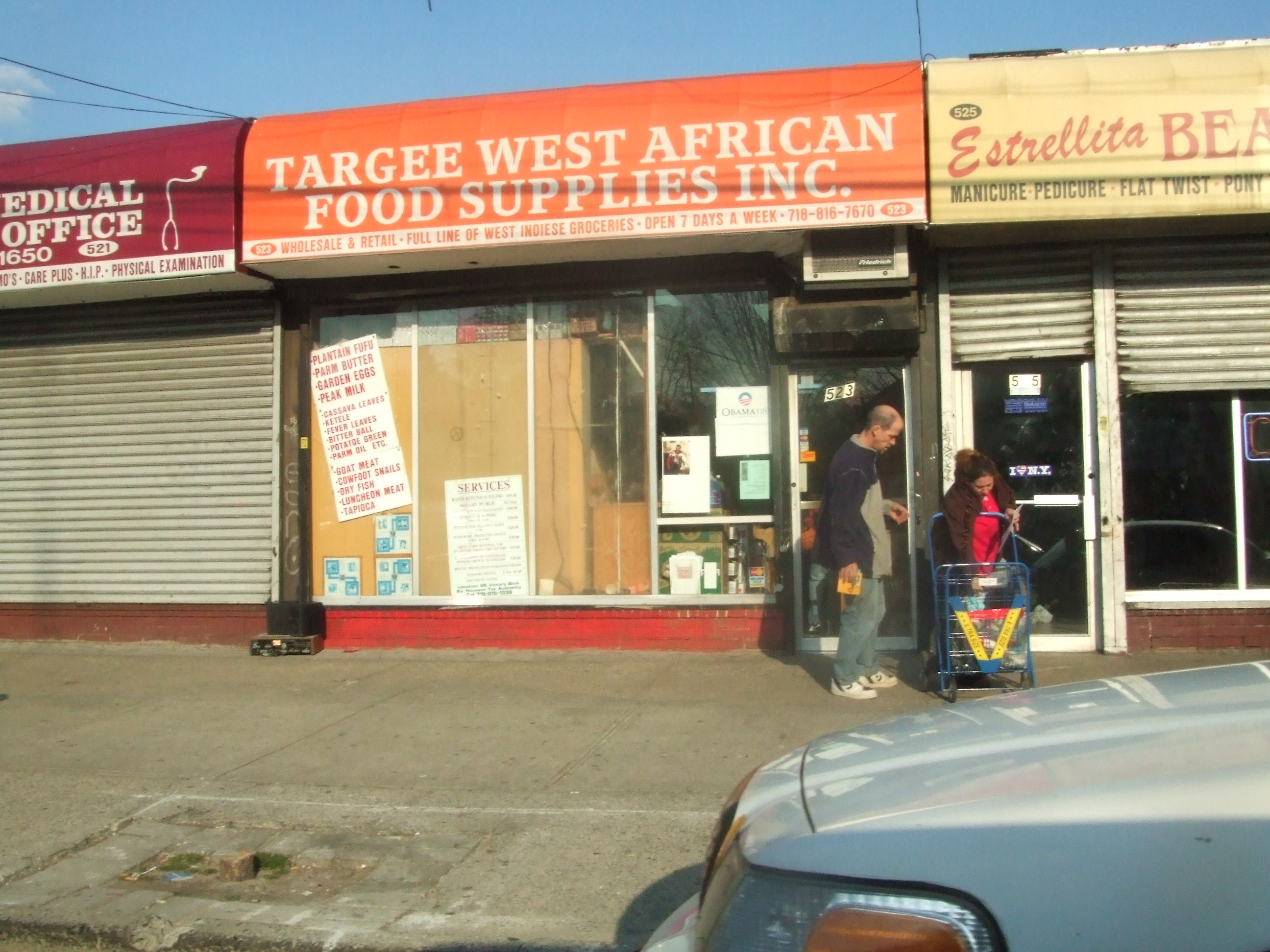
A Liberian grocery in the midst of "Little Liberia", Targee Street.

Park Hill/Clifton (along with nearby Stapleton) had the largest Liberian population of any city outside Africa, with an estimated 6,000 – 8,000 strong community of direct immigrants in 2007. However, this community is largely not present in this area any more; recent census data, from the 2020 United States Census showed that only 78 people claimed to be Liberian.

==== History and context ====
Beginning in the late 1970s, a small number of Liberians, whose nation was founded by freed American slaves in the 1840s, settled in Staten Island. The First Liberian Civil War (1989-1997) led to a flight of Liberian immigrants, fleeing ethnic struggles between the Kru, Gola and Grebo communities, corrupt government, and political strife.

In the late 1980s and early 1990s, Liberian immigrants in huge numbers fled Liberia, mostly trapped in the limbo of refugee camps on the borders of Guinea and Côte d'Ivoire. The United States government, always highly involved in Liberian affairs, began to offer refugee status (Temporary Protected Status-TPS) to displaced Liberians, especially those who had family in the United States.

The Liberian community in Clifton has been involved in a string of government lobbying campaigns since the 1990s to extend the "deferred enforced departure" (DED) status, which since the Presidency of Bill Clinton has had to be deferred on a yearly basis by presidential order for immigrants who fled the Liberian war without immigration visas. Clifton-based community groups like the Staten Island Liberian Community Association (SILCA) have become politically active in defending the estimated 3,600 Liberians across the country who are on DED status.

This new wave of immigration settled near the first small handful of Staten Island Liberians in the Park Hill Projects (now private apartments). As the Liberian civil war intensified, more immigrants followed, creating a vibrant community with African restaurants and businesses, and others working and building businesses across the area, notably in the Nostrand Avenue area of Brooklyn. The wife of soccer star (and former Liberian presidential candidate) George Weah owns a business in Brooklyn and lives in Staten Island. In recent years, Liberian families have been settling in nearby New Jersey, with a large community in the Trenton, New Jersey area. The area has become a regular stop for Liberian politicians and leaders visiting the United States. Local Liberian civic groups organize Liberian-American involvement in their homeland, and promote a variety of charitable missions in West Africa.

==== Social issues ====
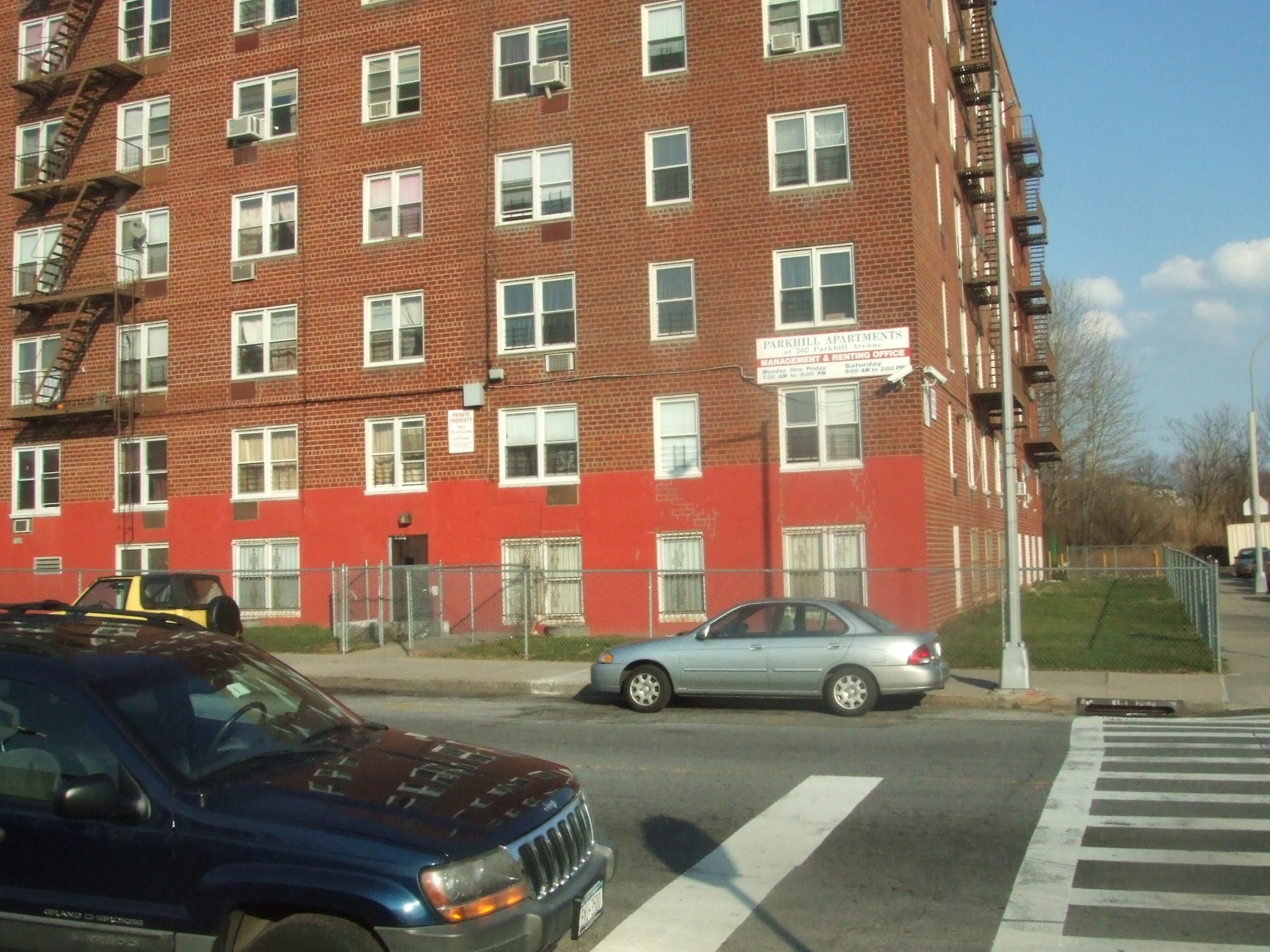
Park Hill apartment complex, southeast corner.

The troubles of the Liberian Civil War period have been carried into the diaspora as well. There are thought to be dozens of former child soldiers living in the Park Hill area. These former child soldiers are often unwilling to talk about past experiences and fear judgment (or prosecution) for wartime deeds. Because of the large population of Liberians in the neighborhood, the Liberian Truth and Reconciliation Commission established after the civil war sent a representative to Clifton to collect testimony from Liberian nationals who experienced the Liberian Civil War and who currently reside in the neighborhood.

While there are successful business leaders in the community, the vast majority of Staten Island's Liberian immigrants are employed in low-wage service or medical fields. Many of the current residents of Park Hill are struggling with illiteracy, difficulty in finding employment, and poverty. Liberian immigrants in Park Hill also suffer from the legacy of poverty and violence in the wider community in which they live. While crime in the area has improved over the last 20 years, the reputation of Park Hill for gang and drug violence has afflicted some Liberian youth, already victimized by the Civil War. Liberian youths arrested while being refugee-status visa holders face deportation back to their homeland. Friction between the Liberians and some in the local African-American community, over jobs, housing, and culture, has also been a source of tension for an already troubled community.

=== Public health ===
Park Hill has environmental issues in regards to pollution and litter. The community's public school system plays a large role in environmental protection including park cleanup, lake maintenance, and litter removal. Eibs Pond, part of a 17-acre (69,000 m^{2}) wetland adjacent to the Park Hill community, was recently restored by the current students of PS 57.

== Education ==
Clifton is served by the intermediate school I.S.49 and the elementary school P.S.57.

== Transportation ==
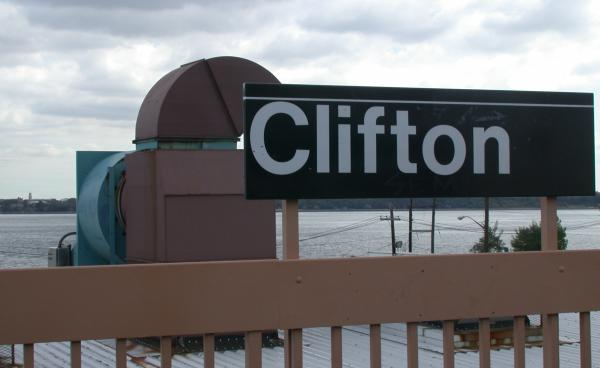
A view from the Staten Island Railway platform in Clifton, looking towards the Narrows.

Staten Island Railway's Clifton station is three stops from the Staten Island Ferry at St. George. Clifton is also served by the S51 and S81 buses along Bay Street, the S52 and S78 buses along Tompkins Avenue, the S74 and S84 buses along Targee Street/Van Duzer Street, and the S76 and S86 buses along Vanderbilt Avenue. Starting in August 2018, express bus service to and from Manhattan is also provided by the SIM30 route.

Due to increased traffic congestion in Clifton, the Staten Island Transportation Task Force and Co-Chairs New York City Department of Transportation (DOT) Commissioner Iris Weinshall and Department of City Planning (DCP) Director Amanda Burden have acted to relieve the congestion in the area. The placement of more "Stop" and "Yield" signs in the neighborhood is another pertinent goal.

== Notable people ==
- William Emerson – judge, lived on Tompkins Avenue near Vanderbilt Avenue, eldest brother of Ralph Waldo Emerson.
- Frederick Law Olmsted – landscape architect, lived in Clifton with his family
- Henry David Thoreau – author, spent summers at the Emerson house in the 1840s, where he tutored the children of Judge William Emerson and penned several letters to Ralph Waldo Emerson.
- John Carrère – architect who designed New York Public Library; lived in Clifton.
- Wu-Tang Clan – hip-hop group; 6 of 9 members—RZA, Method Man, Raekwon, Inspectah Deck, Cappadonna, and U-God—are from Staten Island.
- Gus Edwards - NFL player for the Baltimore Ravens.
- Colin Jost - writer
- Pete Davidson - comedian
- Benji Cavalli - musician

== See also ==
- List of Staten Island neighborhoods
