= Les Ballets Africains =

National dance company of Guinea

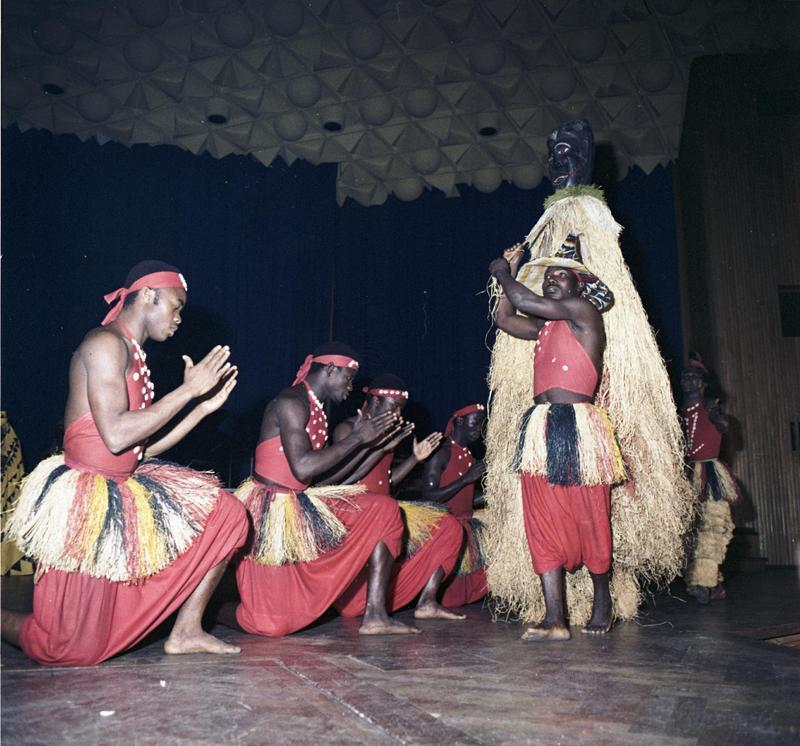
Les Ballets Africains performing in Bonn, West Germany, 18 October 1962

Les Ballets Africains is the national dance company of Guinea and is based in Conakry. It is one of the first African national dance companies. It has toured extensively around the world. Although the French name might suggest the idea of European ballet to English speakers, the focus of the company is actually on promoting traditional African dance and culture.

== History ==
The roots of Les Ballets Africains go back to Guinean poetry student, dancer, choreographer, and musician Fodéba Keïta. In France, in 1948, he founded a poetry group for Africans, which gradually evolved into the drumming, dancing, and storytelling African Theater Ballet of Fodeba Keita.

The company toured Europe from 1951 to 1955 and the United States in 1953. It became Les Ballets Africains in 1952 in Paris. Some initial strong opposition came from various tribes, who were offended that others were dancing their dances and singing their songs, but that objection was eventually overcome.

In the 1950s, among the notable musicians recruited were Guinean djembe drummers "Papa" Ladji Camara and Famoudou Konaté.

In 1958, after Guinea obtained its independence from France, then President of Guinea Ahmed Sékou Touré made the ballet the national ensemble. Regional and nationals orchestras from Syliphone supported Les Ballets Africains on tours.

In 1959, the company performed in the United States, with a run of 48 performances on Broadway, following a successful European tour. They appeared at the Edinburgh International Festival in 1964.

In 1967, while touring in Quebec, Canada, the troupe's director had to go to court in Montreal to answer the charge of inciting minors to give an indecent performance, since both men and women performers, regardless of age, were dancing topless, as was traditional. The judge dismissed the charge.

When President Sékou Touré died in 1984, government support came to an end, and the troupe encountered financial difficulties for several years, but has subsequently resumed touring.

In 1991, Italo Zambo, the company's artistic director, noted that the Los Angeles day performances differed from the night ones and performances in Africa and Europe in one respect: traditionally, Guinean men and women dance bare-chested.

== Notable past members ==
- Famoudou Konaté
- Yatta Zoe
- Kemoko Sano
- Maimouna Camara
- Moustapha Bangoura
- Mouminatou Camara
- Aly Diabate
- Abou Sylla (N'Camara Abou Sylla)
- Arafan Toure
- Rolande Raphaël
- Wigbert Raphaël

== See also ==
- National Ballet of Rwanda
- Royal Ballet of Cambodia
