= Jones Dopoe =

Liberian musician (1935–2023)

- Born: Jones Dopoe; December 1935; Duanpay Town, Nimba County
- Died: November 2023 (aged 87)
- Occupations: Musician; folklorist; academic professor
- Instrument: Vocals

Jones Dopoe (December 1936 – November 2023) was a Liberian musician, folklorist, academic professor, and cultural icon from Nimba County. He made traditional folklore music and was known for the hit tracks "Sweet, Sweet Cassava Leaf", "Mama, I Want to Go to School", and "If You Marry". His music, which was predominantly satirical in nature, addressed social, political, and economic issues affecting Liberia. He was the recipient of the Lifetime Achievement Award at the 2017 Liberia Music Awards. In November 2023, Dopoe died of stroke while seeking treatment at a medical facility in Saclepea.

== Life and career ==
Jones Dopoe was born in December 1936, in Duanpay Town, Nimba County. His father had multiple wives and his mother was the second one. Dopoe was the second born of five boys ans six girls. He attained his primary education at Bahn Elementary and later graduated from Sanniquellie Central High. He played with Sierra Leonean musician S. E. Rogie, who was known for the hit song "My Lovely Elizabeth". Dopoe attended the University of Liberia, where he earned a degree in English. During the 2011 Liberian general election, Dopoe encouraged Liberians to vote on national problems rather than focus on ethnicity. He taught at the African Methodist Episcopal University, University of Liberia, and Cuttington University. In a 2023 interview with The New Dawn newspaper, Dopoe claimed that former president George Weah is his biological son. He previously denied being Weah's father while speaking to a local radio station on October 20, 2020. Dopoe made traditional folklore music and was known for the hit tracks "Sweet, Sweet Cassava Leaf", "Mama, I Want to Go to School", and "If You Marry". Predominantly satirical in nature, his music addressed social, political, and economic issues affecting Liberia. Dopoe was the recipient of the Lifetime Achievement Award at the 2017 Liberia Music Awards.

== Personal life and death ==
According to Dopoe's daughter Benetta Dopoe, he had roughly 26 children, including four from a Ghanaian woman. In November 2023, Dopoe died of stroke while seeking treatment at a medical facility in Saclepea. Prior to his death, his family urged the Liberian government and public for financial assistance so that he could seek medical care.

== Selected discography ==
Compilation albums

- Bilo Lolo (with J. Giron, John Dueh, Morris Dorley, Sonny Boy Hallowanger, and Afro Super 7) (1975)
- The Sound of Liberia (with Morris Dorley, Yatta Zoe, J. Giron, and Sonny Boy Hallowanger) (1977)

== See also ==
- List of Liberian musicians
