= Morris Dorley =

Liberian musician (born 1946)

Background information
- Also known as: Molly Dolly
- Born: 1942; Bomi County, Liberia
- Genres: Electric highlife; palm-wine
- Occupations: Musician; guitarist
- Instrument: Vocals
- Years active: 1960s–1996
- Formerly of: The Sunset Boys

Morris Dorley (born 1946), also known as Molly Dolly, was a Liberian musician and guitarist. Dubbed the "Godfather of Liberian music", he was a major figure in his country's electric highlife scene. Dorley started a local band called the Sunset Boys after learning to play palm-wine music. The hit track "Grand Gedeh Oh! Oh!" helped him and his band become well-known in the late 1960s. Dorley recorded over six compilation LPs at ABC Studio during the late 1970s, and is known for other songs such as "Who Are You Baby", "Osia", and "Voinjama". His compilation projects include Bilo Lolo, Mena Mouna, Rally Time, The Sound of Liberia, and Young Girl. Dorley died from an alcohol-related illness while residing in an IDP camp called VOA.

== Life and career ==
According to oral history, Morris Dorley was born in 1946, in Bomi County, Liberia, and is a member of the Gola tribe. He learned to play the congoma (Note: The congoma is a giant hand piano.) when he was sixteen years old and pursued a career in music after moving to Caldwell. Dorley started making palm-wine music after receiving a guitar from an unnamed American individual, and later formed a local band called the Sunset Boys. (Note: According to other sources, the group was known as the Sunshine Boys.) He and his band gained fame after recording the popular track "Grand Gedeh Oh! Oh!", which was played at president William Tubman's birthday ceremony in 1969. Dorley was the first Liberian singer to perform at a presidential event and the first to break the hold that American music had on the Liberian public. Before "Grand Gedeh Oh! Oh!" was released, the Liberian Broadcasting Corporation only played American R&B and rock-n-roll songs, which made Liberian music largely unknown throughout the country. Dorley recorded over six compilation LPs at ABC Studio during the late 1970s, and is known for the hit singles "Who Are You Baby", "Osia", and "Voinjama". His compilation projects include Bilo Lolo, Mena Mouna, Rally Time, The Sound of Liberia, and Young Girl. The track "Voinjama" is an ode to Lofa County's capital. Dorley performed at the 1977 Festac festival in Lagos and won a prize at the event. He represented Liberia along with musicians Yatta Zoe, Fatu Gayflor, Nimba Burr, and Zack Roberts, one half of the duo Zack & Geebah.

In the early 1980s, Dorley recorded tracks at Studio 99 and worked with record producer Faisal Helwani. All of the tracks he recorded at Studio 99, including "Liberia Is My Home" and "Alive and Well", were released on cassette tape. He often recorded four tracks on side A of the cassette and five on side B. In order to prevent his music from being pirated, he signed 9,000 cassette cards and had other artists sign the cover. Dorley struggled financially despite gaining sub-regional fame. He never desired or trusted a management team to negotiate equitable contracts on his behalf and was not formally educated. Record producers who collaborated with him also took advantage of him. Dorley stopped recording music professionally in 1996 and died a few years later.

== Death, legacy, and artistry ==
Dorley died from an alcohol-related illness while living in an internally displaced person camp called VOA, which is located on the outskirts of Monrovia. He was known as the "Godfather of Liberian music" and is recognized as one of the pioneering musicians who established a demand for Liberian music. Roberts said Dorley was the "precursor for many of us and even today's generational Liberian artists". Radio personality George Kiadii said Dorley's "unique talent" was his ability to instantaneously compose songs from "a coherent mental image". Music producer Charles Snetter called Dorley the "forgotten father of Liberia's music industry" and said his performance at Festac 77 eclipsed every other African act that took the stage. Dorley sang in a high-pitched voice and primarily made Liberian electric highlife and palm-wine music. He also delved into other musical styles such as méringue, rumba, and dagomba highlife.

== Selected discography ==
Studio albums

- Marry Woman

Singles

- "Grand Gedeh Oh! Oh!"
- "Who Are You Baby"
- "Osia"
- "Voinjama"
- "Liberia Is My Home"
- "Alive and Well"

Compilation albums

- Bilo Lolo (with J. Giron, John Dueh, Jones Dopoe, Sonny Boy Hallowanger, and Afro Super 7) (1975)
- Rally Time (with S. Paradise, John Dueh, Bromo Bloh, The Peacemakers, J. Giron, and Sonny Boy Hallowanger) (1977)
- Mena Mouna (with John Dueh, Fantastic 4, Bromo Bloh, and J. Giron) (1977)
- The Sound of Liberia (with Yatta Zoe, Jones Dopoe, J. Giron, and Sonny Boy Hallowanger) (1977)
- Young Girl (with Yatta Zoe, Fantastic 4, J. Giron, Sonny Boy Hallowanger, S. Paradise, and Bromo Bloh) (1977)

== See also ==
- List of Liberian musicians
