= Murder in the Cassava Patch =

Novella by Bai T. Moore

- First edition
- Author: Bai T. Moore
- Language: English
- Genre: Crime fiction
- Publisher: Ducor Publishing House, Monrovia
- Publication date: 1968
- Publication place: Liberia
- Media type: Print (Paperback)
- Pages: 64

Murder in the Cassava Patch is a 1968 novella by Liberian novelist Bai T. Moore. It is required reading for every Liberian high school student, and is widely regarded as a Liberian literary classic in what is a developing literary tradition. It is based on a historic murder.

It was later adapted to a feature film with the same name in 2012, directed by Yor-El Francis.

== Plot ==
This novella deals with the relationship between Gortokai, a young Liberian man, and Tene, the girl he hopes to marry. Tene has been murdered and Gortokai is jailed as a suspect. The story promises "to piece together all the circumstances leading to the violent storm which nearly tore off the roofs from many houses in the Dewoin country one bright Sunday morning in the year 1957." It is set in the fictional village of Bendabli, off the Monrovia-Bomi Hills road. The action ranges from Gbarpolu County in the west as far as Gbarnga and Sanniquellie in the north. Places such as Bomi Hills and Firestone are referred to.

It is told as a first person narrative by Gortokai. The work uses Liberian English and Liberian customs. Moore was an indigenous Liberian who was educated at a United States university.

== Plot summary ==
Gortokai is the son of a contract laborer on Fernando Po, who works in conditions akin to slavery. The man returns to Liberia to find that his contract is subject to barter, making him a virtual slave. He has to give up his son Gortokai, who is fostered by a family from Bendabli. They are Joma, an older man, and his wife Sombo Karn, with their daughters Kema and Tene. Gortokai does not know that he is not born to the family until told years later by Tene.

As he gets older, Gortokai does the heavy work for the family of farming rice, making oil from palm nuts, setting traps for crayfish, and hunting meat. He also takes short-term bush-cutting contracts to earn money for the family's tobacco, salt and annual hut tax.

When Gortokai comes into young manhood, he wants a wife and becomes set on Tene, who has just turned 13 and is about ten years younger than he. He sees a traditional doctor, seeking to draw Tene to him, and also asks her older sister for help. He also must negotiate a bride price.

To earn the money, Gortokai takes a job at a rubber farm far away in Suehn. He sends the girls presents but hears nothing from them. He deliberately injures his foot and uses his convalescence to invite Tene to visit him. Tene and her sister arrive in Suehn, bringing Gortokai gifts of country bread and fried chicken.

Gortokai's employer and his wife throw a party. They are fond of Gortokai, whom the wife calls their "stranger son" (a Liberian term referring to the informal "adoption" of a non-blood relative). The two girls drink a lot of rum. The following morning, Tene seems to both invite, and reject Gortokai's advances. Before the two girls leave, Gortokai gives Kema $23 towards the dowry of $40, plus three dollars for various ritual niceties, plus two sets of clothes for Tene's parents.

Joining Suehn's palm wine circle, Gortokai hears gossip about Kema. His fellow palm wine drinkers convince him that he must buy some powerful love medicine in order to ensure that Tene stays faithful to him. Gortokai visits a country doctor. Bleng uses magic to tell Gortokai that Tene's affections are divided, and explains that the remedy will be strong love medicine. Naturally, this will cost a lot of money.

Gortokai learns that his stepfather is seriously ill, and decides to return to Bendabli. It will give him a chance to get the personal items of Tene's required by the doctor. Arriving early at the village, he happens to overhear a conversation in which Tene declares her interest in "looking around", and seems to refer to adventures with other men. That night, Gortokai gets the items needed by the doctor.

Bleng gives him a week to use the "medicine" and the young lover returns to Bendabli. He works on the family's hut to improve it, and also gives Tene the powder. She leaves with a lover and is revealed as pregnant. Outraged and despondent, Gortokia travels to learn more about relationships in modern Liberia. After several months, he returns to Monrovia, and learns that Tene is also in the capital, selling gari or porridge on the street. She has a young baby but has left her husband and returned to her parents' house. For the first time, Gortokai sleeps with her.

They return to Bendabli to find their family house in a state of disrepair; Joma and his wife are too old to care for it. Gortokai puts things right and is promised Tene as his wife. After several months, he learns that Kema is planning to move Tene and her parents to Firestone. The old couple deny this.

Kema returns from Firestone, demanding strong liquor. Gortokai overhears her conversation with Tene, and both treat him with little respect. Kema invites Tene to join her at Firestone, where the rubber workers of the plantation have money.

The following morning, Gortokai cuts up a parcel of expensive clothes which he has intercepted, and scatters the pieces around town. He also asks Tene to prepare some domboy (mashed cassava). When Tene goes to the cassava patch to prepare the domboy, she finds Gortokai waiting for her.

== Themes ==
=== Incest between Gortokai and Tene ===
The relationship suggests the taboo of incest. Gortokai claims that Tene makes the first move, suggesting she is more knowing. Gortokai appears to accept without question that his being adopted makes the relationship acceptable. He reveals that others in the village do not agree with him.

Gortokai appeared to be initiated at the usual age, making him in his mid 20s when he begins to look for a wife. The couple's game of 'Mamas and Papas' takes place when Tene is a pre-pubescent girl, and Gortokai is in his early 20s. The murder takes place in 1957, when Gortokai would be in his mid-to-late 20s, and Tene would be fifteen years old. She has already had one child and a broken marriage.

=== Domestic slavery and hypocrisy in Liberia ===
Bai T. Moore discussed the novel's main theme as the issue of domestic slavery and its effects in Liberia. He presented an unsentimental view of Liberian life, showing inter-generational tension in the mid-20th century. Liberia. He expressed contradictions within and between them, especially as the traditional ways were giving way to new pressures.

The son of an indentured laborer turned slave, Gortokai is accepted as a "son" by one freeborn family and as a "stranger son" by another. Jomo seems willing to accept this slave's son as a potential son-in-law, and Kema seems willing to accept him as a potential brother-in-law, provided the price is right, but Tene never fully accepts him.
