= Yor-El Francis =

Liberian–American filmmaker and producer

- Born: Yor-El Francis; Monrovia, Liberia
- Occupations: Director, producer, assistant director
- Years active: 2009–present

Yor-El Francis is a Liberian–American filmmaker and film producer. He is most notable as the director of critically acclaimed award-winning film, Murder in the Cassava Patch (2012).

== Personal life ==
He was born in Monrovia, Liberia to a prominent Liberian family; the Martins of Grand Bassa County and the Francis from Marshall. He first attended the Hilton Van Ee School and then American Cooperative School for primary education. Later he attended the Sierra Leone Grammar School in Freetown, Sierra Leone to complete his secondary education. His father owned companies in Ghana, Haiti, Liberia, Sierra Leone, California and Miami and meanwhile, his mother owned a boutique in Monrovia.

== Career ==
After secondary education, he moved to USA with his family and settled in New York City. Then he attended to Hunter College, a liberal arts school on Manhattan's Upper East and studied film and interned at MTV Networks. Later, he obtained a Master of Arts in Film Directing from the City University of New York. In 2003, he was included into the two-year Directors Guild of America's Producer Training Plan.

First he joined as an intern at MTV Networks, then moved to BET, before landing a job at FOX. He started film career as an Assistant Director on motion pictures, television and commercials. He was the second assistant director for many television series and films, including The West Wing (1999), NCIS (2003), The Closer (2005), Crank (2006), Brothers & Sisters (2006), and Zeke and Luther (2009). In 2005, he won the African Film Commission's top prize for screen-writing for his screenplay Piankhi, the Prince of Egypt.

In 2012, he made his maiden feature film, Murder in the Cassava Patch, which is based on his native Liberia. During his visit to Liberia for the film, he met Peter Ballah, with whom he started to produce the film. Later in the film, his entire cast became the children of Ballah.

== Filmography ==
- Never Too Late (second assistant director) 2020
- The House Next Door (second assistant director) (post-production) 2016
- New Day, Same Time (Short) (first assistant director) (completed) 2020
- American Soul (TV Series) (second assistant director - 2 episodes) 2019
- Dolly Parton's Heartstrings (TV Series) (second assistant director - 1 episode)
- The Best of Enemies (first assistant director) 2017-2018
- The Quad (TV Series) (Key Second Assistant Director - 8 episodes)
- All Eyez on Me (second second assistant director) 2016
- Dolly Parton's Christmas of Many Colors: Circle of Love (TV Movie) (second assistant director) 2016
- Barbershop: The Next Cut (second second assistant director) 2015
- Dolly Parton's Coat of Many Colors (TV Movie) (second second assistant director) 2013-2015
- Love Thy Neighbor (TV Series) (second assistant director - 4 episodes)
- If Loving You Is Wrong (TV Series) (additional second assistant director - 20 episodes) 2015
- Hindsight (TV Series) (second assistant director - 10 episodes) 2014
- David Blaine: Real or Magic (TV Movie documentary) (additional camera operator) 2013
- Constantine (TV Series) (second second assistant director - 3 episodes) 2011-2012
- Murder in the Cassava Patch (Film) (Director, producer, writer) 2012
- Zeke and Luther (TV Series) (second assistant director - 26 episodes) 2011
- Porn for Dinner (Short) (first assistant director)
- Brothers & Sisters (TV Series) (second second assistant director - 40 episodes, 2006 - 2009)
- My Name Is Earl (TV Series) (additional second assistant director - 1 episode) 2006
- Dreamgirls (additional second second assistant director) 2006
- Crank (second second assistant director) 2005
- Close to Home (TV Series) (trainee assistant director) 2005
- Night Stalker (TV Series) (trainee assistant director) 2005
- The Dukes of Hazzard (trainee assistant director - uncredited) 2005
- Numb3rs (TV Series) (trainee assistant director - pilot) 2004
- Century City (TV Series) (dga trainee) 2003
- Cold Case (TV Series) (day player DGA trainee) 2003
- Joan of Arcadia (TV Series) (day player DGA trainee) 2003
- NCIS (TV Series) (DGA trainee) 1996
- 7th Heaven (TV Series) (trainee assistant director) 1995
- JAG (TV Series) (DGA trainee day player - 1 episode)
