= Zack & Geebah =

Liberian musical duo

- Origin: Monrovia, Liberia
- Genres: Afro-disco; boogie; disco; reggae
- Years active: 1980s
- Past members: Zack Roberts; Geebah Swaray

Zack & Geebah were a Liberian musical duo known for their Afro-disco style. Composed of Zack Roberts and Geebah Swaray, the duo were previous members of the band Liberian Dreams. They gained popularity in the 1980s and reportedly sold more than 200,000 copies of their music. Zack and Geebah were known for the hit songs "Keep on Trying" and "Sweet Liberia". Although their career was short lived, the duo managed to release two mini albums and a single. For the Love of Money, their 6-track album, is a mixture of boogie, disco, West African melodies, and reggae riddims.

== History ==
Zack & Geebah were composed of singer and drummer Zack Roberts and musician Geebah Swaray. The duo were members of Liberian Dreams, a band known for their hit song "OAU Welcome to Liberia". They decided to record their own music following the band's disbandment, and found work as session musicians in Nigeria. They gained popularity in Liberia in the 1980s and reportedly sold more than 200,000 copies of their music. The duo were known for the hit songs "Keep on Trying" and "Sweet Liberia"; the latter track has been described as a "patriotic ballad". Although their career was short-lived, the duo managed to release two mini albums and a single.

Zack & Geebah's album For the Love of Money was reissued by British record label Barely Breaking Even in 2019, as part of its Tabansi Gold reissue project. The album comprises six tracks and is a blend of boogie, disco, West African melodies, and reggae riddims. It was supported by the single "No Peace No Love". Zack represented Liberia at the 1977 FESTAC festival in Lagos, along with musicians Yatta Zoe, Fatu Gayflor, Nimba Burr, and Morris Dorley. He also performed during the re-opening of the Apollo Theatre in Harlem, New York. In 1989, Zack & Geebah disbanded prior to the start of the First Liberian Civil War. The split was due to Zack's desire to open a studio and pursue a solo career. In an interview with a local media outlet, Zack stated that Geebah never wanted them to split.

In September 2019, Zack threatened a court injunction against the former first lady of Liberia, Clar Weah. He accused her and organizations such as USAID, Fauna & Flora International, Partners in Development, and the Forestry Development Authority of using "Sweet Liberia" and "Keep on Trying" in promotional jingles without seeking permission.

== Albums ==
- For the Love of Money

== See also ==
- List of Liberian musicians
