= Bai T. Moore =

Liberian writer

Bal T. Moore
- Born: October 12, 1916; Dimeh, Liberia
- Died: January 10, 1988 (aged 71); Monrovia, Liberia
- Occupations: Civil servant (Tourism and Cultural Affairs)
- Writing career
- Period: Active from 1947 to his death in 1988
- Genres: Liberian folklore, crime, literary fiction

Bai Tamia Johnson Moore (October 12, 1916 – January 10, 1988), commonly known by his pen name Bai T. Moore, was a Liberian poet, novelist, folklorist and essayist. He held various cultural, educational and tourism posts both for the Liberian government and for UNESCO. He was the founder of Liberia's National Cultural Center. He is best known for his novella Murder in the Cassava Patch (1968), the tale of a crime passionnel in a traditional Liberian setting. It became such a classic in Liberian literature that it is still taught in high schools.

== Life ==
Moore was born in Dimeh, a traditional Gola village on the Monrovia-Tubmanburg highway. He studied at local schools. For college, he traveled to the United States to study agriculture, graduating from Virginia Union University, a historically black college in segregated Richmond, Virginia.

He returned to Liberia in 1941 to take up a post in the national civil service. He was also deeply interested in Liberian culture and society. Together with Roland T. Dempster and T. H. Carey, he co-edited the Liberian poetry collection, Echoes from the Valley: Being Odes and Other Poems (1947).

He was nominated to work for UNESCO on its Liberia desk. In 1957, he headed the government's Fundamental Education project, designed to bring education and information to rural parts of the country. President William Tubman appointed him as Under-Secretary of State for Cultural Affairs.

In 1962, Moore was one of a team of Vai scholars who took part in a conference at the University of Liberia to standardise the Vai script for modern usage.

Moore had continued his writing. In 1968 he published his first novella, Murder in the Cassava Patch, based on actual events. It was highly popular, securing Moore's reputation as Liberia's best-known writer. His book's success helped Moore maintain his public position through some of the most turbulent years of Liberia's history. Under the government of President Samuel Doe, Moore was appointed Minister for Cultural Affairs and Tourism. He held this position at the time of his sudden death at the age of seventy-one.

After a state funeral at the Centennial Memorial Pavilion, attended by cultural troupes from the Dey, Gola, Vai, Kpelle, Gbandi, and Gio tribes, Bai T. Moore was laid to rest in his native Dimeh. Wilton Sankawulo wrote: "The best tribute we can pay to the memory of Bai Tee is making our culture part of our daily life, for culturally we are dressed in borrowed robes. Unless we replace these alien garments with ones of our own making, we will continue failing in all our attempts to build a society that can meet our needs and aspirations".

== Works ==
Moore's earliest published poems appeared as part of the anthology Echoes from the Valley (1947). His first poetry collection was Ebony Dust (1962, reprinted 2001). He next published his novella, Murder in the Cassava Patch (1968), which has been called "a Liberian literary classic". This short novel - which deals with the murder of a young Liberian girl by her jealous lover - has been part of Liberian school curricula since its publication. It explores traditional Liberian life, referring to human sacrifice and indigenous slavery, as well as contemporary mid-20th century attractions.

The Money Doubler (1976) is a novel about a trickster who convinces people to part with their cash on the promise that he will be able to use "African science" to double it. It also explores Liberian life from a realist perspective. Moore uses Liberian English in all the dialogue of the novel.

Moore contributed one of the Four Stories by Liberian Writers, edited by Sankawulo in 1980. Together with Jangaba Johnson, he compiled a collection of Liberian folk tales entitled Chips from the African Story Tree (1967).

== Personal life ==
Moore was Yatta Zoe's first cousin once removed.
