= Yatta Zoe =

Liberian folk singer (born 1942)

- Also known as: Victoria Snetter; Ma Yatta
- Born: 1942 (age 83–84); Bomi County, Liberia
- Genre: Folk
- Occupations: Singer; percussionist; dancer
- Instrument: Vocals
- Formerly of: Zulu Dance Band; Les Ballets Africains
- Spouse: Sorromou

Yatta Zoe (born 1942), previously known as Victoria Snetter and affectionately called Ma Yatta, is a Liberian folk singer, percussionist, dancer, and cultural icon from Bomi County. Dubbed the "Queen of Liberian Folk", her music career spanned four decades. Zoe is known for the hit singles "You Took My Lappa", "All the Pocket Pickers (Have Gone to Bella Yalla)", "Young Girls, Stop Drinking Lysol", "Don't Lie", "Mano River Union", and "Tolbert Yesi". Between 1964 and the mid-1980s, she released twenty-four singles and six albums in the Gola and Mandinka languages. Zoe was a former member of the dance groups Les Ballets Africains and the Zulu Dance Band. She toured Africa, Europe, and the Americas during the 1960s and 1970s, and networked with Fela Kuti and Miriam Makeba.

== Life and career ==
=== Early life and career beginnings ===
A member of the Gola ethnic group, Yatta Zoe was born in 1942, in Bomi County, Liberia. She lost her mother in 1970 and her father when she was a little child. After losing both parents, she lived with her grandmother for a brief period. Zoe resided with Dorothy Cooper's mother after her grandmother died, and attended AA Mission School. She spent a year at the College of West Africa after graduating from AA Mission School. During her time at the College of West Africa, she became pregnant with her first child, and ended up completing her high school studies at Martha Tubman Night School. Zoe met a woman named Willhemena Bryant, who worked at the Basic Arts Center and was friends with one of her uncles. Bryant introduced her to William Lewis, owner of a nightclub called Liberian Jungle. In exchange for $15 a month, Zoe agreed to perform regularly at Liberian Jungle. After returning home from performing one night, she met poet and novelist Bai T. Moore, who told her he was her father's cousin. Moore convinced her to relocate to the US and accept a job offer to teach at a local dancing school owned by a woman he knew. Zoe taught Gola and Vai dance steps while residing in the US.

=== 1960s–2023: Dance groups, notable performances, and cultural initiative ===
Zoe recorded songs at ABC Studio, a two-track studio founded by a Lebanese immigrant and the first studio in Liberia. Following her encounter with Harry Belafonte, she joined the Zulu Dance Band, a South African ensemble that included Miriam Makeba. In an interview with Images magazine, Zoe said she did not get along with Makeba because of the singer's remarks about her fashion style. Zoe joined Les Ballets Africains after being dismissed from the Zulu Dance Band for slapping Makeba. She represented Liberia at several international music festivals, including the 1966 World Festival of Black Arts in Dakar and the 1977 FESTAC festival in Lagos. Zoe performed for Elizabeth II when the queen regnant visited Liberia during president William Tubman's tenure, and sang at the ceremony of former CAR president Jean-Bedel Bokassa. She also performed at several events with Tecumsay Roberts during a two-month stay in Sierra Leone in the mid-1970s, and rehearsed with Dr. Dynamite and the Jazz Leone National.

Zoe toured Africa, Europe and the Americas during the 1960s and 1970s, and networked with Fela Kuti and Makeba. Between 1964 and the mid-1980s, she released twenty-four singles and six albums in the Gola and Mandinka languages. Yatta Zoe at FESTAC, her live album and debut project, was released through King Sunny Adé's record label. Zoe is known for the hit singles "You Took My Lappa", "All the Pocket Pickers (Have Gone to Bella Yalla)", "Young Girls, Stop Drinking Lysol", "Don't Lie", "Mano River Union", and "Tolbert Yesi". Zoe has been called the "Queen of Liberian Folk" and has a four-decade music career. She worked as a costume designer and recruitment officer in the later years of her career. Additionally, she trained MICAT's previous National Cultural Troupe. (Note: MICAT is an acronym for the Ministry of Information, Cultural Affairs and Tourism.) On November 29, 2019, Zoe started a national cultural initiative to encourage Liberians of all ages to reignite their love of storytelling. The initiative began with the Mano River Youth Heritage Awareness Fest, which had the theme "Telling Stories, Not Lies".

In a 2021 interview with Images magazine, Zoe disclosed that she sold her home in Monrovia in order to pay for her medical treatment in Amsterdam. She had multiple surgeries after the civil war and incurred medical debt. On January 16, 2023, Zoe performed at the sixth anniversary of ECOWAS Human Rights Day, an event that honors the legacy of former president Ellen Johnson Sirleaf. The EJS Center hosted the sixth ECOWAS Human Rights Day, which was attended by Jewel Taylor and Yemi Osinbajo, among other notable guests. "All the Pocket Pickers (Have Gone to Bella Yalla)", a song recorded in Nigeria in 1971 and named after the infamous jail that housed political prisoners, was one of two songs Zoe performed at the occasion. Taylor and Sirleaf made a pledge to renovate Zoe's home during the event.

== Artistry ==
Primarily singing in Liberian English and Gola, Zoe also recorded in Vai, Kpelle, Mende, and Gbandi on occasion. She made folk music and emphasized the need for Liberians to embrace their own traditional music. Zoe's music addressed contemporary social issues and their solutions. Her song "Young Girls, Stop Drinking Lysol" addresses themes of betrayal and teaches young ladies not to sacrifice themselves because of love. Zoe played the saa-saa, a gourd rattle instrument.

== Personal life ==
While dancing with Les Ballets Africains, Zoe met a Guinean man named Sorromou, whom she later married. She is related to poet and novelist Bai T. Moore, who was her father's cousin.

== Selected discography ==
Solo albums

- Love Me (1977)
- Yata Zoe, Vol. 2 (1978)
- Tolbert Yesi

Compilation albums

- The Sound of Liberia (with Morris Dorley, Jones Dopoe, J. Giron, and Sonny Boy Hallowanger) (1977)
- Young Girl (with Morris Dorley, Fantastic 4, J. Giron, Sonny Boy Hallowanger, S. Paradise, and Bromo Bloh) (1977)

Live albums

- Yatta Zoe at FESTAC (1977)

Singles

- "Don't Lie"
- "You Took My Lappa"
- "All the Pocket Pickers (Have Gone to Bella Yalla)"
- "Young Girls, Stop Drinking Lysol"
- "Mano River Union"
- "Tolbert Yesi"

== See also ==
- List of Liberian musicians
