= National Ballet of Rwanda =

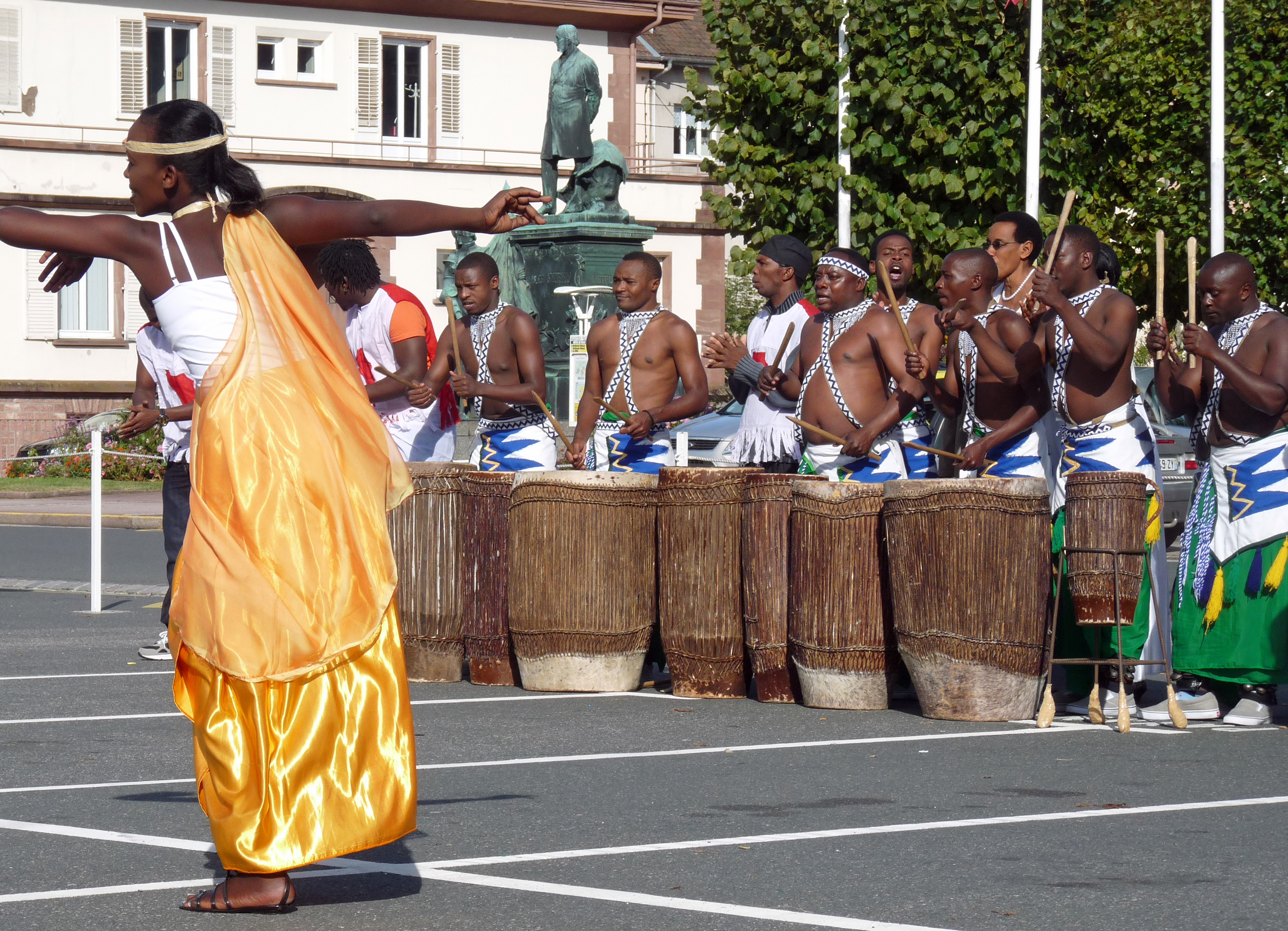
2011 show.

The National Ballet of Rwanda (French: Ballet national du Rwanda), also known as the Urukerereza National Ballet (Ballet national Urukerereza), is a Rwandan dance company. It was created in 1974 at the behest of President Juvenal Habyarimana. Their long-running show features traditional Rwandan songs, drums and dances (not European ballet).

Its name Urukerereza literally means "the one that causes you to delay", referring to how it holds the attention of the audience. Urukerereza was the national dance-music troupe formed in the 1970s by the Ministry of Youth and Culture. Urukerereza became the ballet’s senior troupe with the formation of the junior national troupe, called Indangamirwa (lit. 'the ones who receive the attention'). The junior troupe was formed by Simon Bikindi, supervisor of cultural activities, in 1985. The juniors trained at the former mwami’s palace in Nyanza.

They regularly take part in dance festivals and perform abroad. In 2000, the company made its first visit to North America and performed at the Seattle International Children's Festival.

== See also ==
Other ballets of non-European traditional dances:

- Les Ballets Africains, Guinea
- Royal Ballet of Cambodia
