= Gola people =

Ethnic group

Gola or Koya
Total population
- 304,000

Regions with significant populations
- Liberia: 278,000
- Sierra Leone: 26,000

Languages
- Gola, English, Krio

Religion
- Islam

Related ethnic groups
- Kissi, Sherbro, Temne, Baga, Limba

The Gola or Gula are a West African ethnic group that share a common cultural heritage, language, and history and live primarily in western or northwestern Liberia and eastern Sierra Leone. The Gola language is an isolate within the Niger–Congo language family. As of 2015, about 278,000 people spoke the language.

The name Gola may be the source of the name Gullah, a people of African origin living on the islands and coastal regions of Georgia and South Carolina, in the southeastern United States.

== Demography ==
The Gola are found in the counties of Lofa, Bomi, Montserrado and Grand Cape Mount.

== Notable Gola people ==
- Morris Dorley, musician and guitarist who was born in 1942.
- Zolu Duma (aka King Peter) ruled the Gola and Vai areas in the early 19th century. He participated in negotiations with American settlers of Liberia in 1821.
- Charles Taylor, who ruled Liberia between 1997 and 2003, is of mixed Gola and Americo-Liberian ancestry.
- Ellen Johnson Sirleaf, who was Liberia's president from 2006 to 2018, whose father was Gola, and mother was mixed with Kru and German ancestry.
- Yatta Zoe, singer and dancer whose career spanned four decades.

== Sande and Poro ==
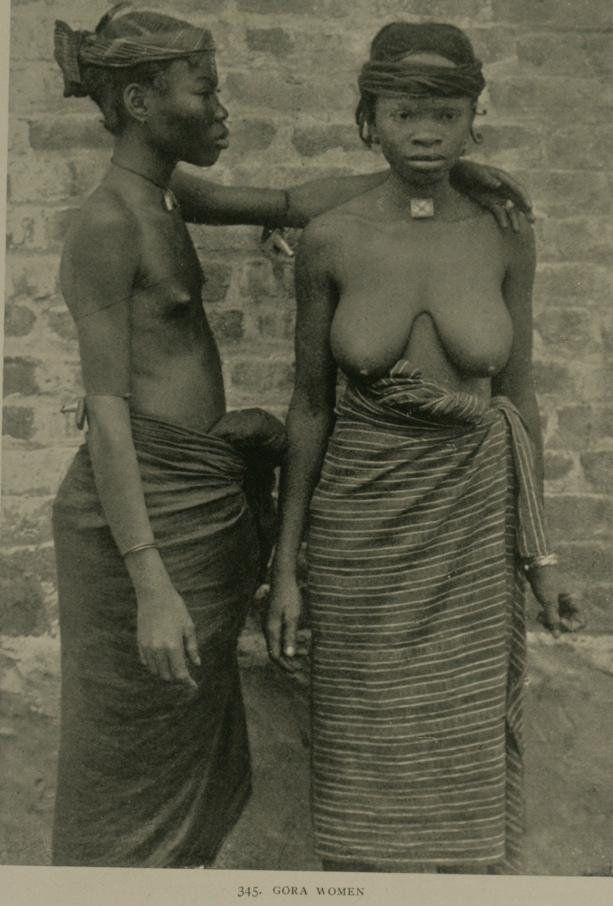
Gola women of Liberia

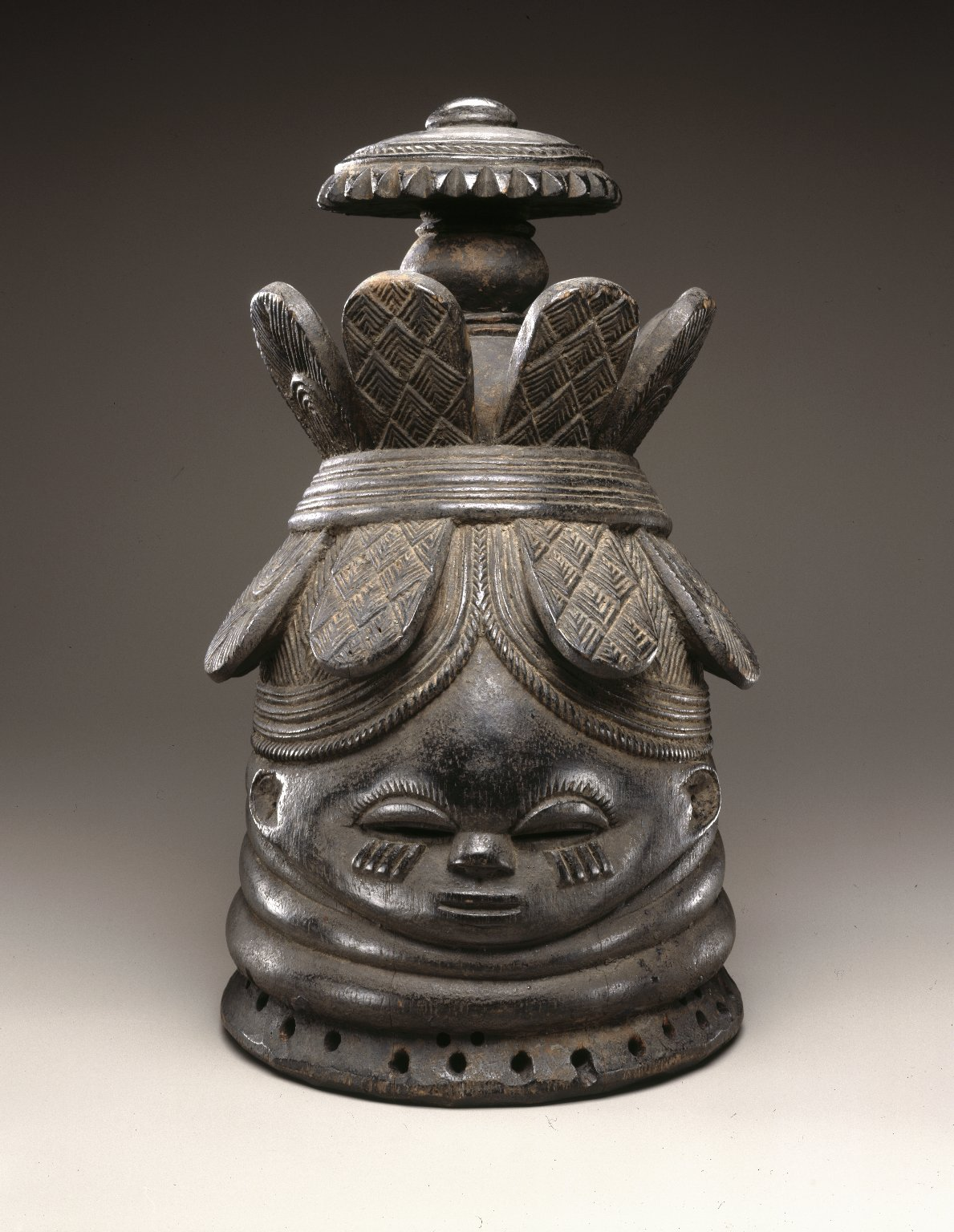
Sowei mask. In Gola it is known as "Zoegbe". Zoe-Gbay

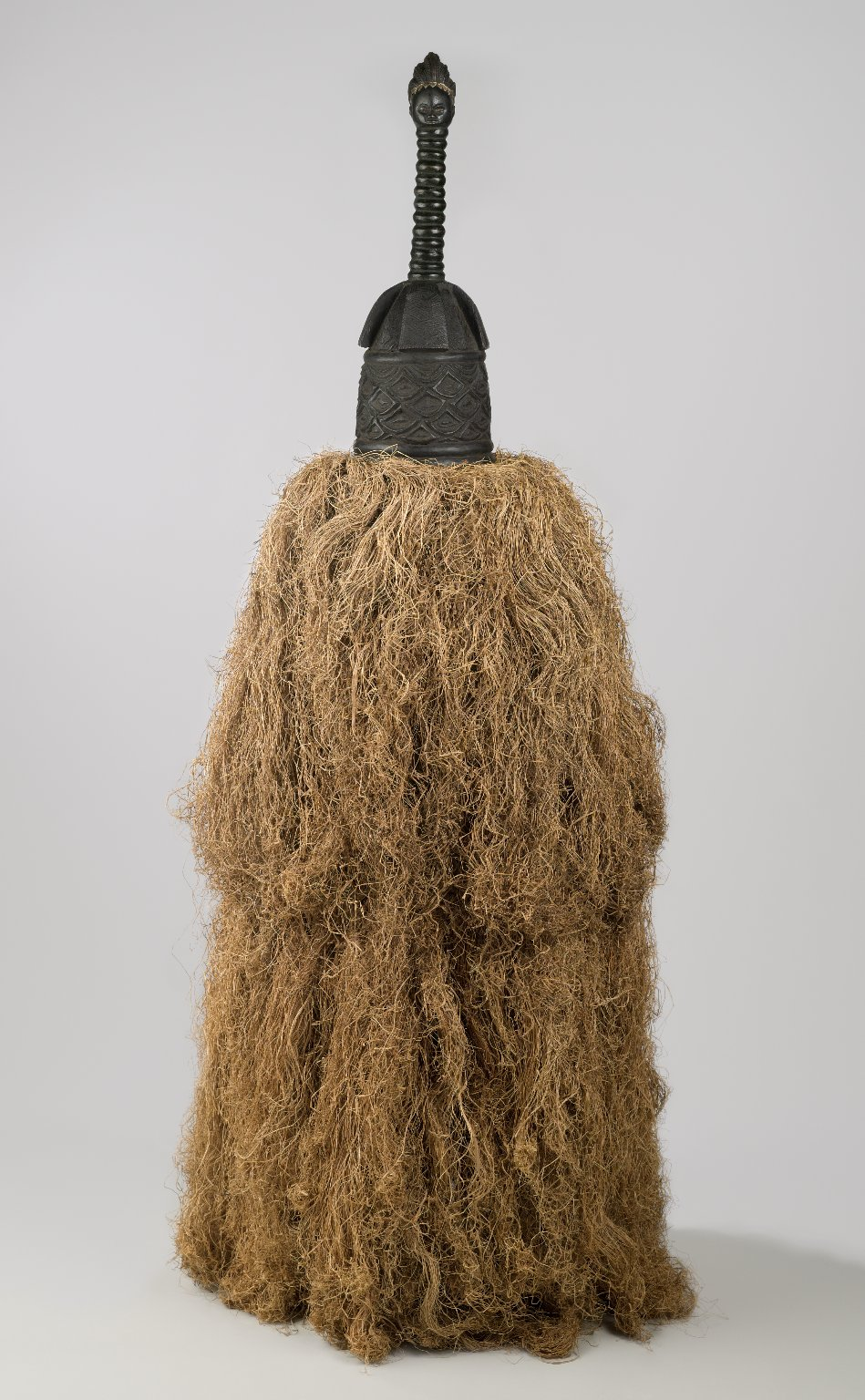
Helmet Mask (Gbetu) with Raffia Costume Brooklyn Museum

There has always been Sande as long as Gola people have existed. The Sande society came before the Bohn or “Poro”. According to oral history (Kabandé), the Gola tribe used to be a matriarchy. The women used to rule the societies with their Sande and water guardian spirits. The women were the Kings (Kandanya) and had the Mandate of Heaven given to them from DAYA (God).

The Zogbenya (Plural of Zogbe) are a specific type of Jina (Djinn/nature spirit) that are friends with the Gola ancestors. They manifest through the black masks that are danced and used for Sande sessions, dances, and rituals today. The Zogbenya are the trainers for the Gola women. They are the Gola woman's ‘Husband from the other side’. The Zogbenya see all Gola people as their children. Many Zogbe masks are found in mountains, creeks, rivers, and streams and are gifts from the other side. Some of the masks are made and disappear when Sande is not in session. The Mazo is the High Priestess of the Sande Society and of the Gola people. She is known as “the lady in white” as she usually dresses in white cloth. The Zogbenya made a covenant with the Gola ancestors to always train their girls into women.

Unlike the Mende, the Gola, Vai, Dei, and Bassa refer to the Zogbe as he/him. He is a male that trains the women. The Mende see the Zogbe (Sowei) as a woman. The Mende Sowei is not as intimidating and vicious like the Gola, Bassa, Vai, and Dei ones are.

The Zogbenya bring justice and order in Gola society. If a man were to disrespect a woman or abuse a woman in any way, during the Sande session the incident would be reported to the Zogbe. Depending on the severity of the situation the Zogbe could either confront the man or hex him with hernia which was feared. Men are not allowed to seem boastful or too comfortable in front of the Zogbe. When the Zogbe dances he always stares at the men. The men should never stare into the eyes or ever get in the way of the Zogbe. Only the Dazo is allowed to dance or be around the Zogbe in such manners.

The Zogbenya are always wearing men's shoes to show their dominance in society. He always dances with a cane, knife, stick, or spear that have heavy medicines and talismans behind it. If in performance and a man or uninitiate is in the way and ends up getting hit by the Zogbe the person is not felt sorry for. Men and Kpola (Uninitiated peoples) stay away and watch for a distance.

In Gola tradition, the Zogbenya are believed to originate from the depths of the water and the universe. Water is regarded as their natural element, and they are credited with expertise in medicines containing water. Their association with water is reflected in their black coloration and adornments, which include nets, cowrie shells, and water deer horns.

When Sande is in session a clan or chiefdom, the Zogbenya go from town to town ‘cleansing’ the land because “men have left the country dirty” from Poro sessions. Sande seasons last 2–3 years before the influence of western school. Sande and Poro sessions are the rites of passage of the Gola people. Ethnic groups adjacent to the Gola adopted Sande as well. Vai Sande women always sing Sande sings in Mende, Gola, or Dei languages. Mende who live in Liberia often send their children to Gola Sande sessions.

According to Gola oral tradition, other ethnic groups later started to make war with the Gola people and the women were not able to fight, they only depended on their water priests (zonya) and shamans. The Gola men then got furious and went into the deep forest where they cast furious forest monster/demon. The spirit was called ‘Dadɛwɛ’ (DAH-deh-weh). Dadewe has a deep voice but has no mask like the Zogbenya (plural for Zogbe). Dadewe also has furious teeth that marks the backs of its initiates. The Dazonya (High Priests) communicated with the spirit that they needed to be properly trained for war. They then brought Dadewe to ‘swallow’ the boys and rebirth them as men. Daya gave the Bohn (Poro) to women but it was too strong for them so it was passed to the men. Once Dadewe trained them they were able to fight back and stay on their land.

Ever since then, the Gola ancestors made a covenant with Dadewe stating that he will train all the Gola boys/descendants and make them men. They also stated that whenever there is war during Sande season it must be paused and the boys must go to the Poro to be trained. They also stated in the covenant that Dadewe will be sent to a near forest when Sande is in session because the women are terrorized by his deep, loud voice. The establishment of the Poro is what made the Gola great again after many years of war and suffering. They made strong kingdoms and became a strong oppressive tribe in Pre and Present Liberia. Now women are rarely allowed to rule over Gola chiefdoms and towns although it happens once in a while.

The Poro became a trans-ethnic institution, spreading to other ethnic groups like the Vai, Mende, Dei, Bassa, Kpelle, Kisi and others. Vai and Dei people credit Gola people as first having the Poro and Sande. Many Vai men and women join Gola Poro and Sande societies. The Dei (Dewoin) and Bassa people MUST always bring a Dazo (High Poro Priest) from Gola sections to “bring the fire” to their Poro sessions to train the boys.

The Poro masks such as Gbetu, Nafai, Yafi, Jobai, Nyaa, and Kɔkpɔ (KOR-kpor) have no spiritual importance like the Zogbenya. They are 'nɛ fɔwɔ' “Play things”. Gola peoples used to have spiritual masks but they had broken a law with Dadɛwɛ and they cannot be used. Now they Poro masks are used for entertainment, meetings, and celebrations. All of the masks are influenced from forest spirits. The Poro spirit Dadewe does not need a mask, for it is heard by all the villagers when it approaches the town.

== Gola names ==
Gola names are very distinctive and similar to the Vai, Mende and Kpelle. Some male Gola names are Siaffa, Seh/Sei, Tarweh, Momolu/Momo, Kayme, Sekou, Ansa, Baimba, Bonokai, Lamie (popular among Vai and Kpelle), Kaijaah, Varney, Varfee, Jallah, Kanneh, Kengbe, Gbessi/Gbessay, Kemokai, Pese, Karmo, Gbotoe, Konowa, Buyamah/Boimah (Popular among the Vai), Kpanna, Lumah (Kpelle and Loma), and Jahn.

Some female names are Fatu (popular among Vai, Mende, and Kpelle), Jebbeh (Vai and Mende), Ciatta/Ciata/Siatta, Miata, Satta, Gbelly, Hawa, Musu, Jandi/Jandae, Jumah, Kemah/Kaymah, Gbessi/Gbessay, Jenneh, Cianna, Maima (Vai and Kpelle), Famatta, Fatumatta (Fula and Malinke), Bendu, Jabateh, Nyanae, Kula, Kumba (Kissi and Loma), Siah, Tenneh (Vai, Mende and Kpelle), Mabasi, Wokie, Weyatta, Yattah, Kpannah, Tatu/Tartu, Somo, Jartu, Fofannah, Zoe, Massa, Yassa, Ciatta, Lorpu, and Somah

Names that Gola and Vai people give their twins are often Konah, Sando, and Zinnah. They are both boy and girl names.

== Culture ==
Most of the Gola people are Muslim. The Gola adopted Islam through the influence of Mandinka merchants from the 16th century onwards.
